= Polk Township, Atchison County, Missouri =

Township in Atchison County, Missouri, U.S.

Polk Township
- Township
- Coordinates: 40°30′56″N 95°30′24″W
- Country: United States
- State: Missouri
- County: Atchison

Area
  - Total: 62.32 sq mi (161.4 km^{2})
  - Land: 62.32 sq mi (161.4 km^{2})
  - Water: 0.0 sq mi (0 km^{2}) 0.0%
- Elevation: 994 ft (303 m)

Population (2020)
  - Total: 211
  - Density: 3.4/sq mi (1.3/km^{2})
- FIPS code: 29-00558700
- GNIS feature ID: 766238

Polk Township is a township in Atchison County, Missouri, United States. At the 2020 census, its population was 211.

== History ==
Polk Township was established in 1845 and was one of the five original townships in Atchison County. It was named after President James K. Polk. It was reduced in size to its present boundaries by 1871 due to portions of it being given to the following other Atchison County townships: Buchanan, Clay, Lincoln, and Tarkio.

== Geography ==
Polk Township covers an area of 62.32 square miles (161.4 km^{2}) and contains no incorporated settlements. The town, and former county seat, of Linden was located in its center. It contains six cemeteries: Grange Hall, High Creek, Linden, Noblitt-Gibson, Steiner, and St. John's Lutheran.

The streams of McElroy Creek, High Creek, West High Creek, and Hall Branch run through this township.

A settlement named Farmer's City was located in northeastern Polk Township at the northwest corner of Section 4, Township 66 North, Range 40 West.

== Transportation ==
The following highways travel through the township:

- Interstate 29
- U.S. Route 275
- Route AA
- Route B
- Route F
- Route T
- Route Y
