= Platte Purchase =

Land Purchase by the U.S. from American Indians

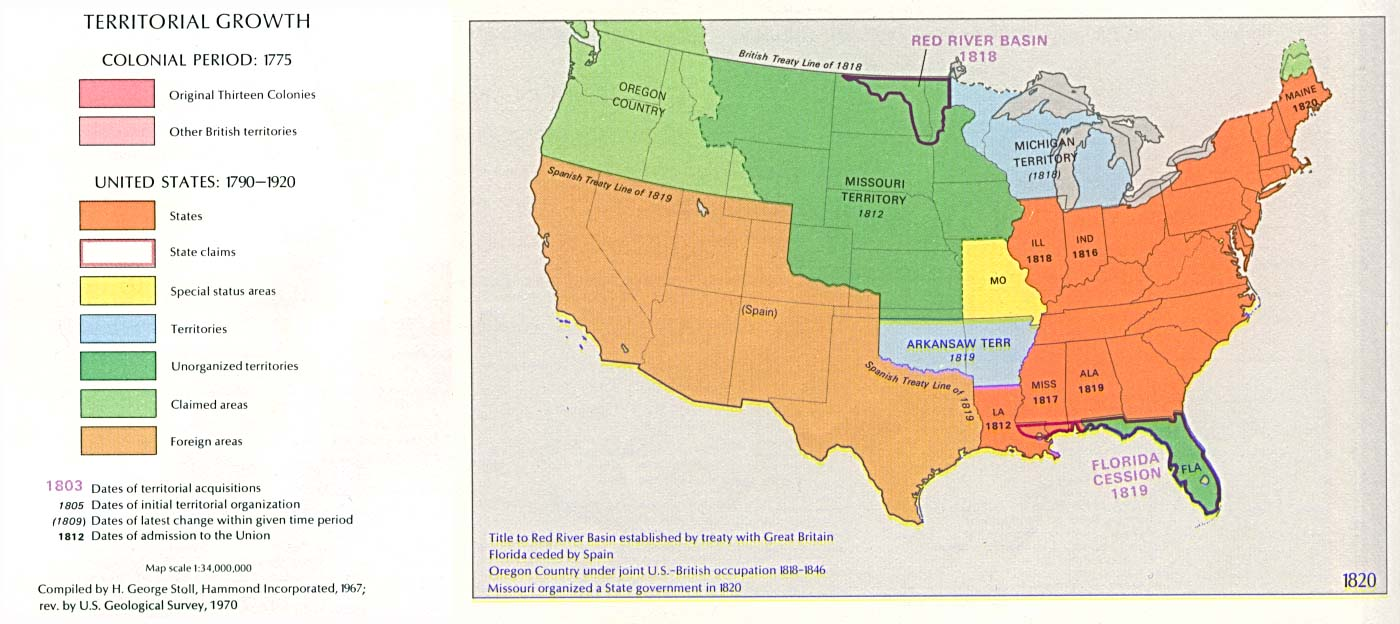
The United States in 1820. The graphic shows the straight line western border of Missouri. The Missouri Compromise prohibited slavery in the Unorganized Territory (dark green) and permitted it in Missouri (yellow).

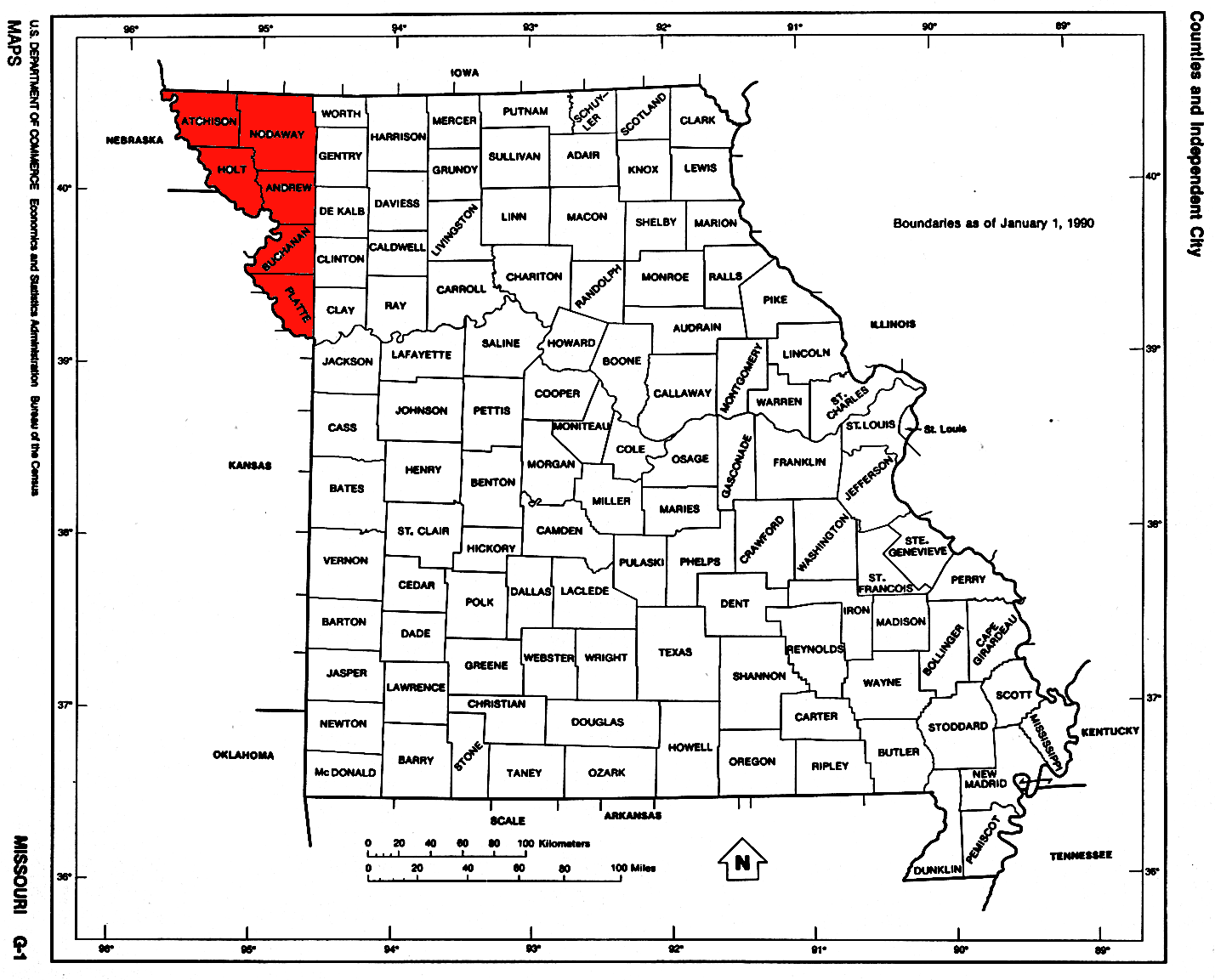
The Platte Purchase region (highlighted in red).

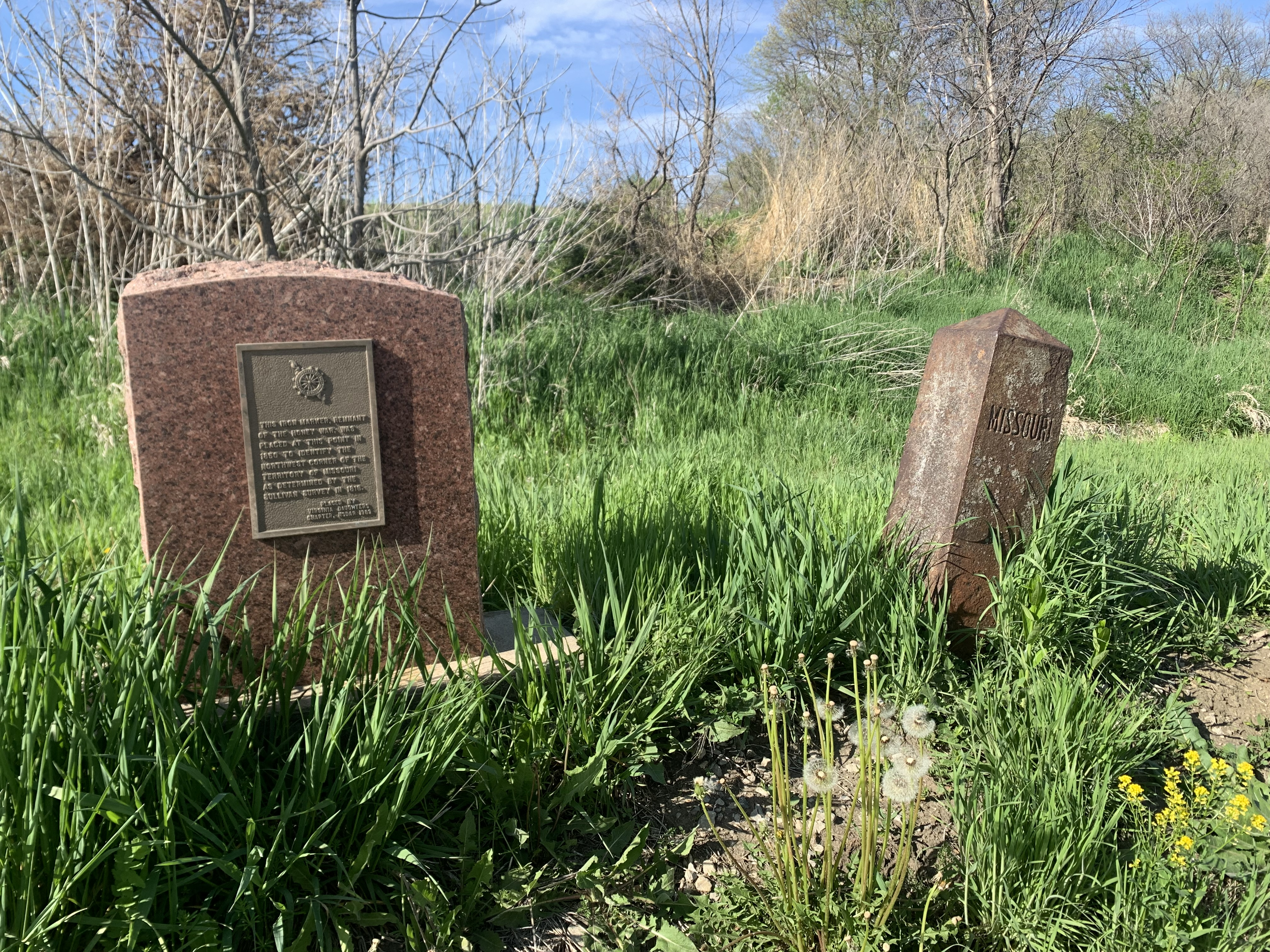
Iowa-Missouri Border Marker from the Platte Purchase north of Sheridan, Missouri (40°34′16″N 94°36′02″W)

The Platte Purchase was a land acquisition in 1836 by the United States government from American Indian tribes of the region. It comprised lands along the east bank of the Missouri River and added 3,149 square miles (8,156 km^{2}) to the northwest corner of the state of Missouri.

This expansion of the slave state of Missouri was in violation of the Missouri Compromise of 1820, which prohibited the extension of slavery in the former Louisiana Territory north of the parallel 36°30′ north, except within the boundaries of the state of Missouri, as defined at the time of the adoption of the Missouri Compromise. The area acquired was almost as large as the states of Delaware and Rhode Island combined, and extended Missouri westward along the river. St. Joseph, one of the main river ports of departure for the westward migration of American pioneers, was located in the new acquisition.

The region of the Platte Purchase includes the following modern counties within its bounds: Andrew, Atchison, Buchanan, Holt, Nodaway, Platte, and a small portion of Worth. It also includes what are now the northwest suburbs of Kansas City, a small area of Kansas City proper, the cities of St. Joseph and Maryville, Missouri, as well as Kansas City International Airport and almost all of Missouri's portion of Interstate 29, save the small portion which runs concurrently with Interstate 35 in Clay County.

== Purchase ==
When Missouri entered the Union, its western border was established as

"a meridian line passing through the middle of the mouth of the Kansas river, where the same empties into the Missouri river, thence, from the point aforesaid north, along the said meridian line, to the intersection of the parallel of latitude which passes through the rapids of the river Des Moines, making the said line correspond with the Indian boundary line."

The purchase extended Missouri's western border north of the Kansas River east along the Missouri River to 95°46′ west longitude.

Less than a year after the Indian Removal Act of 1830, by which the US was authorized to remove the Native American population, the Missouri General Assembly was petitioning Congress to more clearly define the border on the northwest corner of the state. The Legislature noted the boundary was not clear, and that the land was not surveyed, thus leading to settlers encroaching on the lands. The most spectacular example of encroachment was Joseph Robidoux, who had been operating an American Fur Company trading post at St. Joseph, Missouri since 1826.

On January 27, 1835, Senator Lewis F. Linn wrote John Dougherty, an Indian agent, to inquire about acquiring the land. Dougherty agreed, noting that the territory was preventing access to Missouri River shipping by Missouri residents east of the purchase line. According to an early 20th-century historian, Dougherty's reputation among the Native Americans was that of the "Controller of Fire-water" from the Missouri River to the Columbia River.

The first tribes to give up their land were the Potawatomi, who ceded their land in the Treaty of Chicago. They agreed to this in 1833 but the treaty wasn't finalized until 1835. The Potawatomi (about 1,000 to 2,000) moved north to a reservation in Pottawattamie County, Iowa (Council Bluffs, Iowa). They moved again 1837–1838 in the Potawatomi Trail of Death to Osawatomie, Kansas.

The formal application came in the summer of 1835 at a meeting on the Dawes farm near Liberty, Missouri. Andrew S. Hughes, the US Indian agent for the Sauk and Meskwaki peoples, presided over a meeting of Missouri residents who formally asked Congress to acquire the land. Missouri senator Thomas Hart Benton introduced a bill to acquire the land and it was approved with little opposition in June 1836.

An agreement was reached on September 17, 1836, with the chiefs Mahaska and No Heart of the Ioway tribe and leaders of the combined Sauk and Meskwaki tribes in a ceremony at Fort Leavenworth, Kansas. It was presided by William Clark, the Superintendent of Indian Affairs, who was based in St. Louis. (He was one of the leaders of the Lewis and Clark Expedition.) Noted diplomat Jeffrey Deroine, a formerly enslaved man, served as an interpreter for this treaty.

The Senate approved the treaty on February 15, 1837. On March 28, 1837, President Martin Van Buren issued a proclamation supporting the annexation. In October 1837, the Missouri General Assembly accepted the land and placed it all initially in the newly created Platte County.

This addition increased the land area of what was already the largest state in the Union at the time (about 66,500 square miles (172,000 km^{2}) to Virginia's 65,000 square miles, which then included West Virginia). The acquisition challenged the Missouri Compromise of 1820 by expanding slavery into free territory north of the southern Missouri border with Arkansas (Parallel 36°30′ north), and the Indian Removal Act. It required a second relocation of tribes who had just been moved "permanently" west of the Missouri border, as part of the forced Indian removal policy of ethnic cleansing from lands wanted by whites.

The tribes were paid $7,500 for their land. The U.S. government was "to provide agricultural implements, furnish livestock", and a host of other small items. The tribes agreed to move to reservations west of the Missouri River in what was to become Kansas and Nebraska. Furthermore, the U.S. government was to "build five comfortable houses for each tribe, break up 200 acres (0.8 km^{2}) of land, fence 200 acres (0.8 km^{2}) of land, furnish a farmer, blacksmith, teacher, interpreter." The reservations are today known as the Iowa Reservation and the Sac and Fox Reservation. The tribes gave up 3.1 thousand square miles of land for reservations of 29 square miles combined (26 for the Sac and Fox and 3 for the Ioway).

Michigan entered the Union on July 4, 1836. By the time the Platte Purchase was finalized, Missouri remained the second biggest state.

== Settlement ==
The U.S. Government set up a United States General Land Office in Plattsburg, Missouri to handle the settlement. Much of the land was dispensed as military land warrants to veterans of the War of 1812 (and later Mexican–American War). Under the terms of the program, which was expanded in 1855, the 160-acre land grants could be given to military descendants and those grants could be sold.

Initial settlement was concentrated in the Town of Barry in south Platte County. Almost overnight, Platte County became the second-largest county in the state, and Weston, Missouri ("West Town") was second only to St. Louis, Missouri in the state. St. Joseph would subsequently become the second-largest city in the state in the early settlement days. Since the purchase opened up a new slave area, the area was settled primarily by slaveholders from the Upper South: Virginia, Tennessee and Kentucky. They brought enslaved African Americans with them or purchased them at slave markets, to work such Southern commodity crops as the labor-intensive hemp and tobacco. These were grown in the southern portion of the purchase, where farms and plantations had access to the Missouri River for shipping to market. The northern portion of the purchase attracted fewer Southerners and slaveholding was rare.

== Geography ==
Today the Platte Purchase area is among the most rural areas in Missouri. St. Joseph and Maryville, Missouri are the only communities totally within the purchase area that have populations greater than 10,000. Kansas City, Missouri has influenced the area, expanding its boundaries into southern Platte County.

=== Counties ===
A list of counties in the Platte Purchase region of Missouri including 2024 population estimates.
† Partially located outside of region

Name	Area	Population	County Seat
Andrew	435 square miles (1,130 km^{2})	18,091	Savannah
Atchison	545 square miles (1,410 km^{2})	5,139	Rock Port
Buchanan	410 square miles (1,100 km^{2})	83,574	St. Joseph
Holt	462 square miles (1,200 km^{2})	4,241	Oregon
Nodaway	877 square miles (2,270 km^{2})	20,503	Maryville
Platte	420 square miles (1,100 km^{2})	113,207	Platte City
Worth^{α} †	266 square miles (690 km^{2})	1,872	Grant City

^α A portion of Congressional Townships 65, 66, and 67, Range 33 was originally part of Nodaway County and was later ceded to Worth County

=== Municipalities ===
A list of populated places in the Platte Purchase region of Missouri with 2020 US census populations.

† County seat
†† Partly outside Platte Purchase region

Name	County	Municipal Type	Population
Kansas City ††	Platte	Home Rule City	508,090
St. Joseph †	Buchanan	Home Rule City	72,473
Maryville †	Nodaway	3rd Class City	10,633
Smithville ††	Platte	4th Class City	10,406
Parkville	Platte	4th Class City	7,117
Savannah †	Andrew	4th Class City	5,069
Platte City †	Platte	4th Class City	4,784
Riverside	Platte	4th Class City	4,013
Country Club	Andrew	Village	2,487
Weatherby Lake	Platte	4th Class City	2,077
Weston	Platte	4th Class City	1,756
Gower ††	Buchanan	4th Class City	1,533
Tarkio	Atchison	4th Class City	1,506
Rock Port †	Atchison	4th Class City	1,278
Mound City	Holt	4th Class City	1,004
Lake Waukomis	Platte	4th Class City	888
Oregon †	Holt	4th Class City	837
Agency	Buchanan	Village	671
Fairfax	Atchison	4th Class City	648
Ferrelview	Platte	Village	642
Edgerton	Platte	4th Class City	601
Burlington Junction	Nodaway	4th Class City	521
Dearborn	Platte and Buchanan	4th Class City	482
Hopkins	Nodaway	4th Class City	472
Camden Point	Platte	4th Class City	457
Ravenwood	Nodaway	4th Class City	439
Platte Woods	Platte	4th Class City	394
Northmoor	Platte	4th Class City	291
Maitland	Holt	4th Class City	276
Tracy	Platte	4th Class City	269
Farley	Platte	Village	265
Faucett	Buchanan	CDP	248
Skidmore	Nodaway	4th Class City	245
Forest City	Holt	4th Class City	243
Amazonia	Andrew	4th Class City	238
De Kalb	Buchanan	4th Class City	233
Houston Lake	Platte	4th Class City	229
Easton	Buchanan	4th Class City	227
Rushville	Buchanan	Village	225
Barnard	Nodaway	4th Class City	201
Conception Junction	Nodaway	3rd Class City	175
Fillmore	Andrew	4th Class City	173
Bolckow	Andrew	4th Class City	163
Clearmont	Nodaway	4th Class City	158
Pickering	Nodaway	4th Class City	149
Graham	Nodaway	4th Class City	147
Sheridan^{α}	Worth	4th Class City	145
Parnell	Nodaway	4th Class City	135
Rosendale	Andrew	4th Class City	119
Westboro	Atchison	4th Class City	116
Cosby	Andrew	Village	114
Elmo	Nodaway	4th Class City	114
Conception	Nodaway	CDP	111
Craig	Holt	4th Class City	105
Lewis and Clark Village	Buchanan	Village	96
Ridgely	Platte	Village	95
New Market	Platte	CDP	88
Big Lake	Holt	Village	65
Watson	Atchison	Village	61
Guilford	Nodaway	Village	60
Arkoe	Nodaway	Village	56
Clyde	Nodaway	Village	55
Rea	Andrew	Village	46
Quitman	Nodaway	CDP	42
Iatan	Platte	Village	39
Blanchard	Atchison	CDP	27
Fortescue	Holt	Village	21
Bigelow	Holt	Village	5
Corning	Holt	Village	3

^α This settlement is within the original Platte Purchase boundary despite being in a county that is mostly excluded from the Platte Purchase.

== Politics ==
Year	Democrat		Republican		Third Party	
Year	#	%	#	%	#	%
2020	46,730	39.38%	69,662	58.70%	2,278	1.92%
2016	37,532	34.61%	64,284	59.28%	6,626	6.11%
2012	41,897	40.69%	58,955	57.26%	2,107	2.05%
2008	50,263	45.64%	58,147	52.79%	1,728	1.57%
2004	44,926	43.14%	58,476	56.14%	750	0.72%
2000	40,642	44.83%	47,162	52.02%	2,857	3.15%
1996	37,736	45.06%	35,235	42.07%	10,781	12.87%
1992	36,146	40.18%	28,796	32.01%	25,021	27.81%
1988	39,900	51%	38,028	48.61%	308	0.39%
1984	31,354	40.18%	46,681	59.82%	0	0%
1980	33,533	43.80%	38,966	50.90%	4,058	5.30%
1976	37,450	50.49%	35,974	48.50%	749	1.01%
1972	23,106	33.32%	46,241	66.68%	0	0%
1968	29,987	43.11%	33,308	47.89%	6,257	9%
1964	44,949	64.89%	24,322	35.11%	0	0%
1960	36,414	46.85%	41,307	53.15%	0	0%
1956	35,453	47.26%	39,559	52.74%	0	0%
1952	34,882	44%	44,278	55.86%	113	0.14%
1948	40,696	59.60%	27,471	40.23%	115	0.17%
1944	35,492	51.84%	32,912	48.08%	55	0.08%
1940	44,574	53.78%	38,233	46.13%	76	0.09%
1936	51,438	60.01%	33,956	39.61%	243	0.38%
1932	48,212	64.09%	26,580	35.34%	429	0.57%
1928	27,323	39.71%	41,369	60.12%	118	0.17%
1924	31,756	44.86%	35,311	49.88%	3,729	5.27%
1920	32,975	46.57%	37,188	52.52%	645	0.91%
1916	22,986	55.25%	17,965	43.18%	651	1.56%
1912	19,697	51.76%	11,355	29.84%	6,999	18.39%
1908	21,255	51.89%	19,083	46.59%	620	1.51%
1904	18,103	46.48%	19,884	51.05%	961	2.47%
1900	21,745	51.57%	19,599	46.48%	824	1.95%
1896	21,603	54.62%	17,571	44.43%	375	0.95%
1892	16,605	48.33%	14,131	41.13%	3,622	10.54%
1888	16,674	51.44%	14,398	44.42%	1,344	4.15%
1884	15,701	52.75%	13,903	46.71%	161	0.54%
1880	14,000	51.13%	11,179	40.82%	2,204	8.05%
1876	13,130	56.05%	9,947	42.46%	350	1.49%
1872	10,342	53%	9,172	47%	0	0%
1868	3,554	33.95%	6,915	66.05%	0	0%
1864	1,852	24.55%	5,692	75.45%	0	0%
1860	4,934	40.53%	972	7.98%	6,268	51.49%
1856	4,380	61.08%	0	0%	2,791	38.92%
1852	3,456	57.31%	2,574	42.69%	0	0%
1848	3,776	60.57%	2,458	39.43%	0	0%
1844	3,867	65.16%	2,068	34.84%	0	0%
1840	2,096	72.40%	799	27.60%	0	0%

== See also ==
- Historic regions of the United States
- Ioway Reservation
- Sac and Fox Reservation
