= Nishnabotna River =

River in Iowa, Missouri, and Nebraska, U.S.

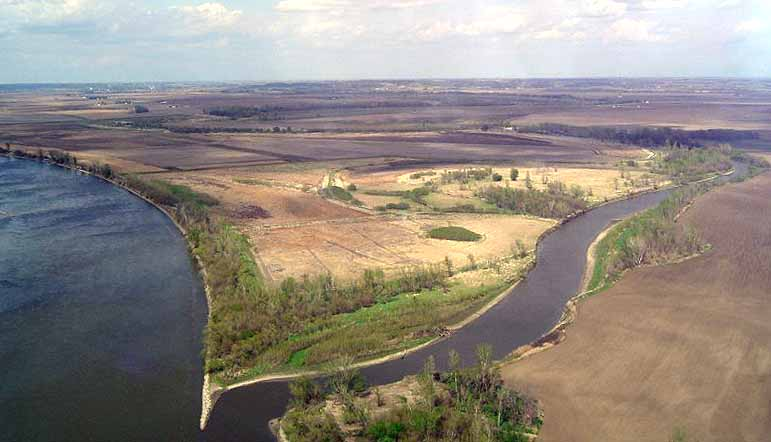
- Mouth of the Nishnabotna River at the Missouri River viewed from the southwest

Location
- Country: United States
- State: Iowa and Missouri
- County: Fremont County, Iowa and Atchison County, Missouri

Physical characteristics
- Source: Confluence of the East and West Nishnabotna rivers
  - location: Madison Township
  - coordinates: 40°39′08″N 95°37′24″W
  - elevation: 909 ft (277 m)
- Mouth: Missouri River
  - location: Nishnabotna Township
  - coordinates: 40°30′52″N 95°40′38″W
  - elevation: 899 ft (274 m)
- Length: 15.7 mi (25.3 km)
- Discharge
  - location: Hamburg, Iowa
  - average: 1,040 cu ft/s (29 m^{3}/s)
  - minimum: 62 cu ft/s (1.8 m^{3}/s)
  - maximum: 25,400 cu ft/s (720 m^{3}/s)

Basin features
- Progression: Nishnabotna River → Missouri River → Mississippi River → Atlantic Ocean

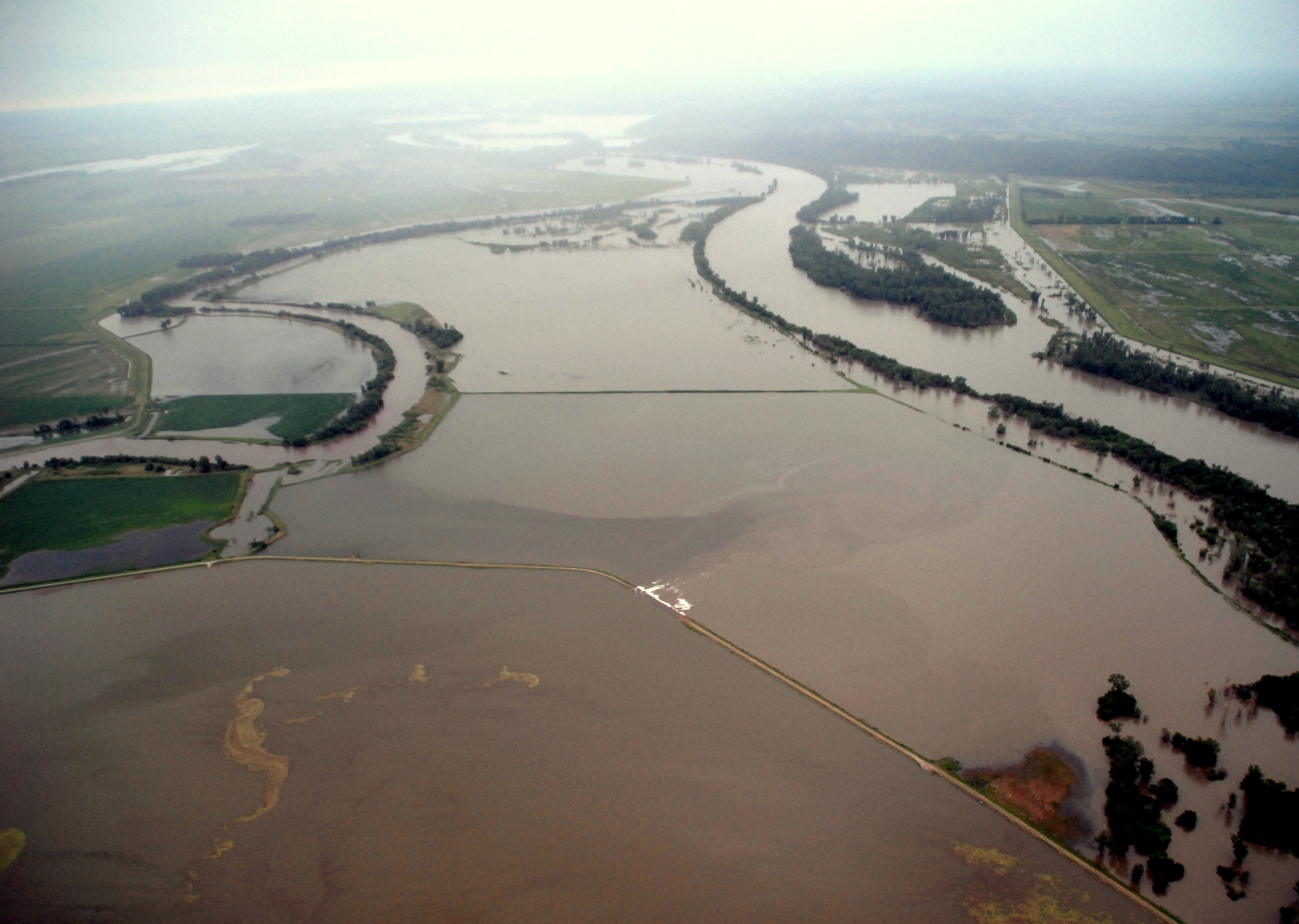
Flooding (and levee breach) at the confluence on June 16, 2011, during the 2011 Missouri River floods viewed from the northeast. The meander in the river is where it briefly crosses from Missouri to Nebraska on McKissick Island and then back to Missouri before entering the Missouri River.

The Nishnabotna River (/nɪʃnəˈbɑːtnə/) is a tributary of the Missouri River in southwestern Iowa, northwestern Missouri and southeastern Nebraska in the United States. It flows for most of its length as two parallel streams in Iowa, the East Nishnabotna River and the West Nishnabotna River. The east and west branches are each about 120 miles (190 km) long; from their confluence, the Nishnabotna flows approximately another 16 miles (26 km). Several sections of the rivers' courses have been straightened and heavily channelized.

The river is the third largest stream in Iowa on the Missouri slope, after the Big Sioux River and Little Sioux River. It has the second largest watershed in Iowa, since only a small portion of the Big Sioux drains in Iowa. The mouth of the Nishabotna was formerly 20 miles further south in Atchison County, Missouri, but changes in the Missouri River have cut off the lower portion and reduced the length of the river.

== Etymology ==
Traditionally, it has been assumed that the name "Nishnabotna" comes from an Otoe (Chiwere) word meaning "canoe-making river." However, it has been proposed more recently that the name comes from the Osage language and means "spouting wellspring."

=== Variant names ===
This toponym, as well as many other Indian names, have challenged Western settlers' orthography. The following are some of the variant names.

According to the Geographic Names Information System, the river has also been known as:

- Good Canoe River
- Nishabotna River
- Nishabotny River
- Nishabotony River
- Nishebotona River
- Nishnabotony River
- Nishnebotna River
- Nishnebotne River
- Nishnebotona River
- Nishnebottona River
- Willo River
- Willow Slough

Other sources cite many of the above names in addition to the following:

- Ichinipokine River
- Neshna Battona
- Neeshba Creek
- Neeshnahbatona
- Neeshnahbotona Creek
- Nichenanbatonnais
- Nichinanbatonais River
- Nichinibatone River
- Nishanbotnah River
- Nishnahbatona River
- Nishne Botna River
- Nishnay Baton River
- Washbatonan River

== History ==
In March 2024, a fertilizer spill killed much of the aquatic life across a 60-mile stretch of the Nishnabotna River in Iowa and Missouri, leaving an estimated 789,000 fish dead in one of the region's most ecologically devastating chemical spills on record. The source of the spill originated when a valve was left open on a storage tank over the weekend of March 9–11 at NEW Cooperative, an agricultural business in Red Oak, Iowa. The leak drained approximately 265,000 U.S. gallons (1,000,000 L) of liquid nitrogen fertilizer into the nearby East Nishnabotna River.

== Course ==
=== East Nishnabotna River ===
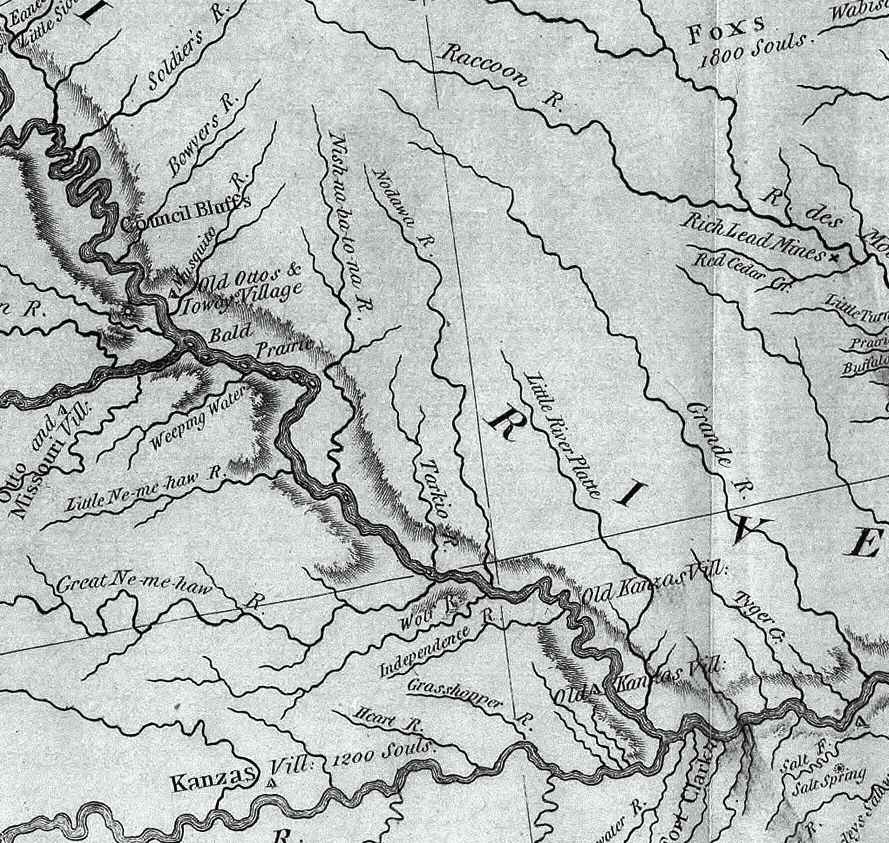
This excerpt from the Lewis and Clark map of 1814 shows the rivers of southwest Iowa, southeast Nebraska, and northwest Missouri. The "Nish-na-bot-to-na River" is seen in the west-central portion of the map.

The East Nishnabotna rises in southwestern Carroll County and flows generally south-southwestwardly through Audubon, Cass, Pottawattamie, Montgomery, Page and Fremont Counties, past the towns of Exira, Brayton, Atlantic, Lewis, Elliott, Shenandoah, Red Oak and Riverton. At Red Oak, the river's average discharge is 506 cubic feet per second.

=== West Nishnabotna River ===
The West Nishnabotna River rises in southwestern Carroll County and also flows generally south-southwestwardly through Crawford, Shelby, Pottawattamie, Mills and Fremont Counties, past the towns of Manning, Irwin, Kirkman, Harlan, Avoca, Hancock, Oakland and Carson. At Harlan, it collects the West Fork West Nishnabotna River, which rises in southwestern Carroll County and flows southwestwardly through Crawford and Shelby Counties, past Manilla and Defiance. Near Avoca, it collects the East Branch West Nishnabotna River, which rises in southwestern Carroll County and flows southwestwardly through Audubon, Shelby and Pottawattamie Counties. The West Nishnabotna was the topic of a humorous song "Four Wheel Drive" on the 1975 C.W. McCall album Wolf Creek Pass. At Randolph, Iowa, the river averages 747 cubic feet per second.

=== Lower river ===
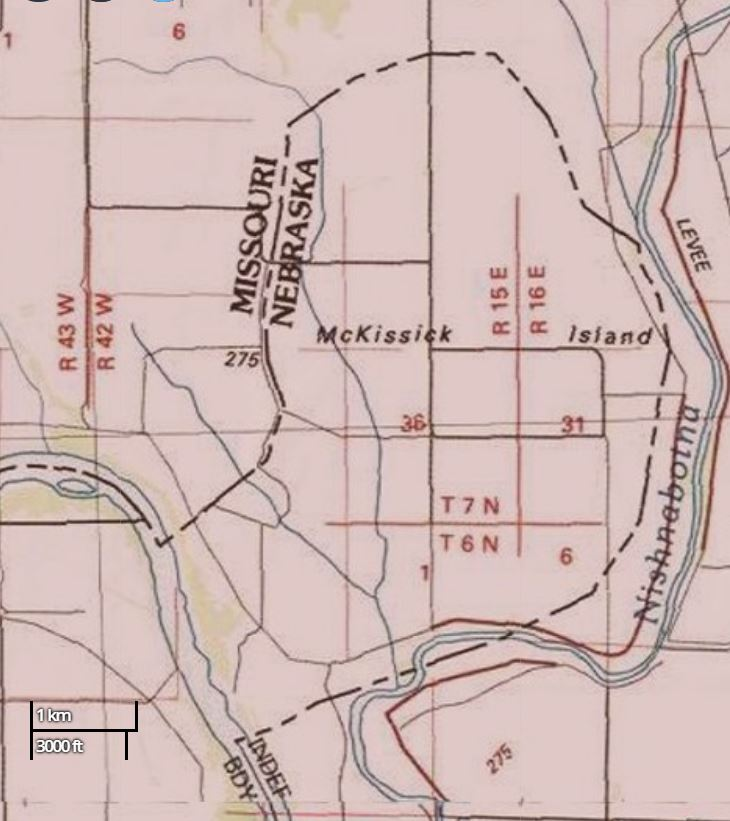
Topographic map of the McKissick Island area

The East and West rivers merge in southwestern Fremont County and continue as the Nishnabotna River for its short course past Hamburg and into northwestern Atchison County, Missouri, where it flows into the Missouri River 2 mi (3 km) west of Watson.

In the last mile of the river it flows from Missouri to Nebraska and back to Missouri before entering the Missouri River in west central Atchison County, MO. This is because an 1867 flood straightened a bend in the Missouri and caused the Nishnabotna to flow about two miles further to reach the Missouri. The Nishnabotna forms roughly the southeastern border of the 5,000-acre McKissick Island, which was the land Nebraska and Missouri both claimed. The Supreme Court in 1904 officially drew the border with Nebraska getting the land although it is east of Nebraska's normal eastern border which is the river. At Hamburg, the river has a mean annual discharge of 1,441 cubic feet per second.

== Recreation ==
Parks along the river include Botna Bend in Hancock, Willow Slough Wildlife Management Area, three miles southwest of Henderson, and Riverton Wildlife Management Area, just north of Riverton. Canoe rentals are available at Botna Bend. The best paddling is between Hancock and Carson on the west fork and between Lewis and Griswold on the east fork (see "Paddling Iowa" by Nate Hoogeveen). The Wabash Trace Nature Trail crosses both forks. At its crossing of the west fork, one can see the wreckage of a freight train that derailed and went into the river in the 1960s.

== See also ==
- Tributaries of the Missouri River
- List of Iowa rivers
- List of Missouri rivers
- List of Nebraska rivers
- Mormon Trail
