= Buchanan Township, Atchison County, Missouri =

Township in Atchison County, Missouri, U.S.

Buchanan Township
- Township
- Coordinates: 40°33′52″N 95°39′31″W
- Country: United States
- State: Missouri
- County: Atchison

Area
  - Total: 42.02 sq mi (108.8 km^{2})
  - Land: 41.25 sq mi (106.8 km^{2})
  - Water: 0.77 sq mi (2.0 km^{2}) 1.83%
- Elevation: 906 ft (276 m)

Population (2020)
  - Total: 65
  - Density: 1.6/sq mi (0.62/km^{2})
- FIPS code: 29-00509244
- GNIS feature ID: 766231

Buchanan Township is a township in Atchison County, Missouri, United States. At the 2020 census, its population was 65. The northwest corner of the township is the northwest corner of the entire state.

== History ==
Buchanan Township was established on May 17, 1858, and named after James Buchanan, the 15th President of the United States.

Prior to its official incorporation, the western portion was called Bluff Township (or sometimes West Buchanan Township), with the east portion being Buchanan Township (or sometimes East Buchanan Township), until Bluff Township's annexation at the organization of the county in 1845.

=== Settlements ===
El Paso was a town in Buchanan Township that was platted in either July 1852 or 1853. It was located between the Nishnabotna and Missouri rivers in the southwest quarter of Section 2, Township 66 North, Range 42 West. It was a noted trading point, with a store, a blacksmith, and a post office. The post office was named El Paso and operated from 1856 until 1864. It was the first and only post office established in Buchanan Township.

When the Nishnabotna changed course in the 1860s, a new town called Sacramento (also Sacramento City) was laid out a couple of miles southwest in Section 10. In 1872, the Missouri River changed its course and the two towns were vacated. Much of the buildings and people resettled further from the river in Hamburg, Iowa.

== Geography ==
The Nishnabotna River passes north-south through the township, and Nebraska has a pene-enclave named McKissick Island that comprises most of its southern border.

Lower Hamburg Island, an island of the Missouri River, is located in the westernmost portion of the township and extends slightly into Fremont County, Iowa. The island is within the Lower Hamburg Bend Conservation Area and contains the northwesternmost point in Missouri.

Buchanan Township covers an area of 42.02 square miles (108.8 km^{2}) and contains no incorporated settlements. Buchanan Township has three cemeteries: Clayton-Lewis, Cox Chapel, and Union. Greys Lake is within this township.

== Transportation ==
The following highways travel through the township:

- Interstate 29
- U.S. Route 275
- Route CC
- Route V

== See also ==
- IA-MO-NE tripoint
