= Buchanan Township =

Buchanan Township may refer to:

- Buchanan Township, Jefferson County, Iowa
- Buchanan Township, Page County, Iowa
- Buchanan Township, Michigan
- Buchanan Township, Atchison County, Missouri
