= Center Grove =

Center Grove may refer to the following places in the United States:

- Center Grove, Indiana in Johnson County
- Center Grove, Iowa in Dubuque County
- Center Grove, Missouri, a ghost town
- Center Grove, Texas in Houston County

== See also ==
- Center Grove Township, Dickinson County, Iowa
- Center Grove High School in Greenwood, Indiana
