= York, Missouri =

Extinct hamlet in northwest Missouri, U.S.

Coordinates: 40°24′28″N 95°15′56″W

York is an extinct hamlet in eastern Atchison County, in the U.S. state of Missouri. It was located along the Little Tarkio River just south of the present day route of US 136.

== History ==
York was founded in 1857 by Archibald York, and named for him. A post office called York was established in 1878, and remained in operation until 1901.
