= Nishnabotna Township, Atchison County, Missouri =

Township in Atchison County, Missouri, U.S.

Nishnabotna Township
- Township
- Coordinates: 40°28′52″N 95°38′45″W
- Country: United States
- State: Missouri
- County: Atchison

Area
  - Total: 28.82 sq mi (74.6 km^{2})
  - Land: 28.21 sq mi (73.1 km^{2})
  - Water: 0.61 sq mi (1.6 km^{2}) 2.12%
- Elevation: 902 ft (275 m)

Population (2020)
  - Total: 129
  - Density: 4.6/sq mi (1.8/km^{2})
- FIPS code: 29-00552598
- GNIS feature ID: 766237

Nishnabotna Township is a township in Atchison County, Missouri, United States. At the 2020 census, its population was 129.

== History ==
Nishnabotna Township was organized in 1845 and was one of the five original townships in Atchison County, though it was originally recorded as Nishnebottona. It takes its name from the Nishnabotna River which flows through it. Historically, Nishnabotna was thought to be a Native American name meaning "a river where boats were built". However, more recent research indicates that the name, which was adopted from the Osage language, means "spouting wellspring."

In Spring 1839, the first white settlers in Atchison County were Hank B. Roberts and Thomas Wilson at the town site of Sonora. Sonora was later laid out in 1846. The township was reduced to its present size at the creation of Templeton Township in 1871.

== Geography ==
Nishnabotna Township covers an area of 28.82 square miles (74.6 km^{2}) and contains one incorporated settlement, Watson. It contains two cemeteries: Addington and Sonora. The Nishnabotna River enters the Missouri River in the northwest corner of the township. There is little physical relief, as the township lies almost entirely on the floodplains of the two rivers. The stream of High Creek runs through this township. Agriculture is the dominant land use. Evans Island is a land feature along the Missouri River that is located in the southwesternmost part of the township.

== Transportation ==
Nishnabotna Township contains one airport, Garst Airport.

The following highways travel through the township:

- Interstate 29
- Route A
- Route B
- Route BB
- Route D
- Route RA

== In the media ==
Nishnabotna Township is probably best known outside the immediate region for a reference by the New Yorker cartoonist George Booth, a native of Missouri. In a single-panel cartoon, one threadbare and addled character says to another as they cross a crowded street in New York City: "Mother always says that. Mother always says you have to be a little bit crazy to live in New York. Mother is a little bit crazy, but she doesn't live in New York. Mother lives in Nishnabotna, Missouri."
