= William Benjamin Polk =

American politician

William Benjamin "Ben" Polk (January 24, 1930 – October 1, 2014) was an American politician.

Ben Polk was born in Hamburg, Iowa. Polk went to the Percival High School in Percival, Iowa He served in the United States Marine Corps from 1948 to 1956. He went to the University of Illinois and the University of Nebraska. Polk lived in Moline, Illinois. He worked for the American Red Cross and served on the staff of Congressman Tom Railsback. Polk served in the Illinois House of Representatives from 1972 to 1982 and was a Republican. In April 1982, Ben Polk resigned from the Illinois General Assembly, when he was appointed assistant director of the Illinois Department on Aging. Polk taught at Lincoln Land Community College and Springfield College in Illinois; he also taught at Edison State College in Fort Myers, Florida. He lived in South Pasadena, Florida, after retiring, and died in South Pasadena.
