= Rock Port High School =

Location
- 600 S Nebraska Street; Rock Port, Missouri 64482; United States
- 40°24′35″N 95°31′04″W

Information
- Type: Public
- School district: Rock Port R-II School District
- Superintendent: Ethan Sickels
- Principal: Donnie Parsons
- Teaching staff: 15.47 (on FTE basis)
- Grades: 7–12
- Enrollment: 166 (2023–2024)
- Student to teacher ratio: 10.73
- Colours: Blue and white
- Athletics conference: 275 Conference
- Mascot: Blue jay
- Website: rockport.k12.mo.us/junior-high-high-school/

Rock Port High School is a public secondary school (grades 7–12) in Rock Port, Missouri.

== District ==
Rock Port High School is part of the Rock Port R-II School District. Rock Port Elementary School (K-6) feeds into Rock Port High School.

The district includes the municipalities of Rock Port and Watson, as well as the Phelps City census-designated place.

== Enrollment ==
In 2012, Rock Port had 105 students in the high school and 19 teachers.

== Notable alumni ==
- Hardin Cox, American politician, businessman, and writer, 1945 graduate of Rock Port High School
- Zel Fischer, a current Judge on the Missouri Supreme Court, 1981 graduate of Rock Port High School

== See also ==
- List of high schools in Missouri
