= Tarkio Township, Atchison County, Missouri =

Township in Atchison County, Missouri, U.S.

Tarkio Township
- Township
- Coordinates: 40°26′14″N 95°23′13″W
- Country: United States
- State: Missouri
- County: Atchison

Area
  - Total: 47.92 sq mi (124.1 km^{2})
  - Land: 47.89 sq mi (124.0 km^{2})
  - Water: 0.03 sq mi (0.078 km^{2}) 0.06%
- Elevation: 994 ft (303 m)

Population (2020)
  - Total: 1,637
  - Density: 34.2/sq mi (13.2/km^{2})
- FIPS code: 29-00572358
- GNIS feature ID: 766239

Tarkio Township is a township in Atchison County, Missouri, United States. At the 2020 census, its population was 1637.

Tarkio Township was organized in 1845 and was one of the five original townships in Atchison County. It was named after the Tarkio River. It was reduced from its original size at the establishment of Lincoln Township.

== Geography ==
Tarkio Township covers an area of 47.92 square miles (124.1 km^{2}) and contains one incorporated settlement, Tarkio. It contains one cemetery, Home.

The streams of Cow Branch, Middle Tarkio Creek, and West Tarkio Creek run through this township.

Center Point (or Centre Point) is an extinct hamlet in northeast Tarkio Township. It was first settled on July 4, 1844. A post office called Center Point was established in 1875 and remained in operation until 1880.

== Transportation ==
Tarkio Township contains one airport, Gould Peterson Municipal Airport.

The following highways travel through the township:

- U.S. Route 59
- U.S. Route 136
- Route AA
- Route J
- Route O
