= Zel Fischer =

American judge (born 1963)

Chief Justice of the Missouri Supreme Court
- In office July 1, 2017 – June 30, 2019
- Preceded by: Patricia Breckenridge
- Succeeded by: George W. Draper III

Justice of the Missouri Supreme Court
- Incumbent
- Assumed office October 15, 2008
- Preceded by: Stephen N. Limbaugh Jr.

Personal details
- Born: April 28, 1963 (age 62) Hamburg, Iowa, U.S.
- Party: Republican
- Education: William Jewell College (BA); University of Missouri, Kansas City (JD)

Zel M. Fischer (born April 28, 1963) is an American lawyer who has served as a judge of the Supreme Court of Missouri since 2008. Fischer served a two-year term as chief justice from 2017 to 2019. A native of Watson, he received his undergraduate degree from William Jewell College and his Juris Doctor degree from the University of Missouri-Kansas City. While at William Jewell College he was a member of the Alpha Delta Chapter of Kappa Alpha Order. He was elected as a Republican to serve as Atchison County judge in 2006 after private practice in Atchison, Nodaway and Holt counties for nearly 15 years.

Following the Missouri Plan for the appointment of appellate judges in Missouri, Fischer was one of three candidates proposed to Governor Matt Blunt by the state's Appellate Judicial Committee to replace Judge Stephen N. Limbaugh Jr. Blunt announced his appointment of Fischer on October 15, 2008, on the grounds of the Atchison County, Missouri Courthouse in Rock Port, Missouri. He cited Fischer's judicial philosophy of strict interpretation of the state's constitution and laws as the reason for his selection. He was sworn in as a Supreme Court judge on October 23, 2008.

In 2024, he voted against allowing the initiative to legalize abortion and women's reproductive rights to appear on state-wide ballots for the November 2024 election. He was part of the dissenting opinion in the 4-3 ruling.

Legal offices
Preceded by Stephen N. Limbaugh Jr.	Justice of the Missouri Supreme Court; 2008–present	Incumbent
Preceded by Patricia Breckenridge	Chief Justice of the Missouri Supreme Court; 2017–2019	Succeeded by George W. Draper III
