= Watson, Missouri =

Village in Missouri, U.S.

- Village
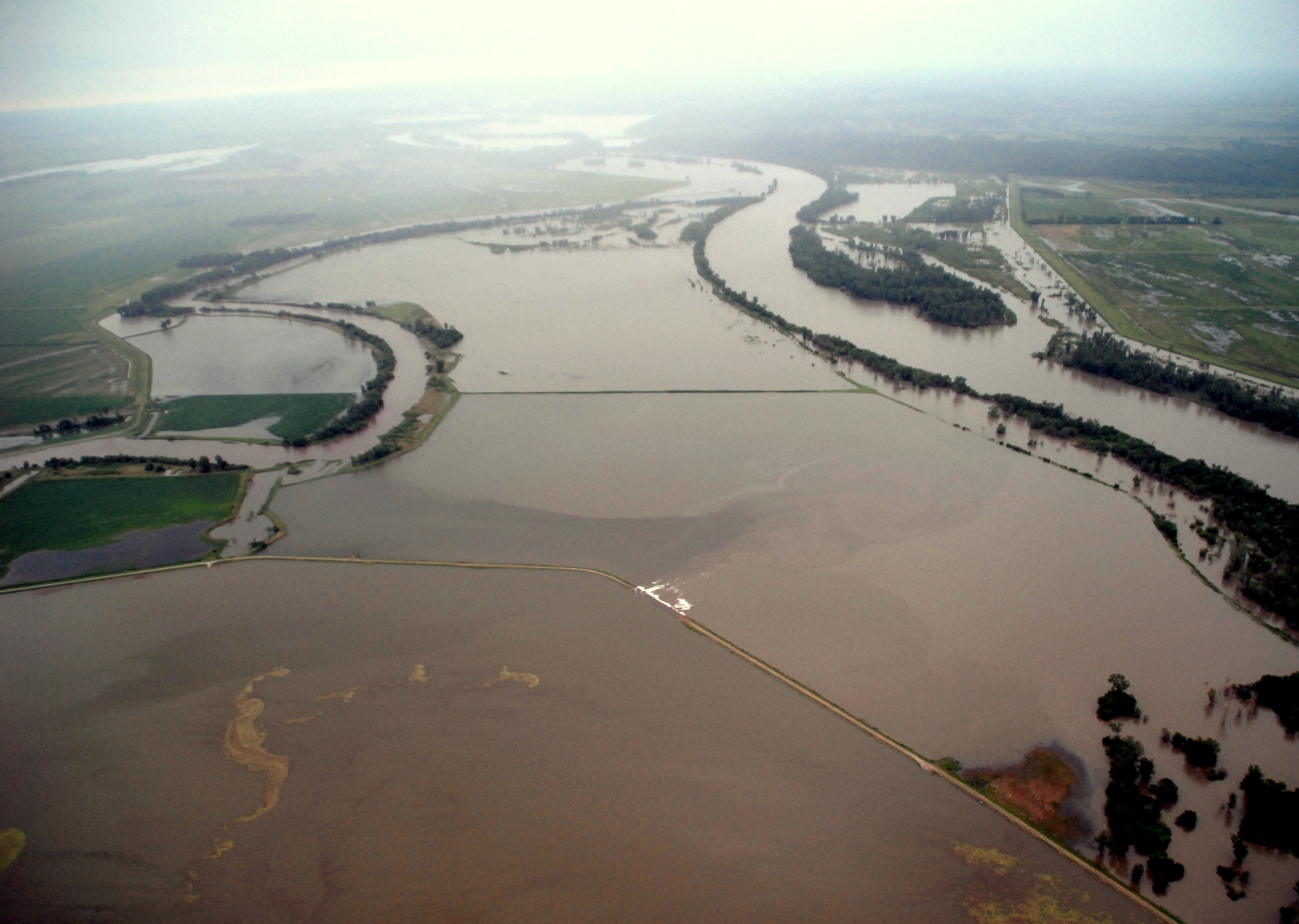
- Flooding at the confluence of the Nishnabotna and Missouri Rivers on June 16, 2011, during the 2011 Missouri River floods

- Location of Watson, Missouri
- Coordinates: 40°28′48″N 95°37′26″W
- Country: United States
- State: Missouri
- County: Atchison
- Township: Nishnabotna

Area
  - Total: 0.11 sq mi (0.28 km^{2})
  - Land: 0.11 sq mi (0.28 km^{2})
  - Water: 0 sq mi (0.00 km^{2})
- Elevation: 899 ft (274 m)

Population (2020)
  - Total: 61
  - Density: 561.9/sq mi (216.96/km^{2})
- Time zone: UTC-6 (Central (CST))
  - Summer (DST): UTC-5 (CDT)
- ZIP code: 64496
- Area code: 660
- FIPS code: 29-77848
- GNIS feature ID: 2400107

Watson is a village in Nishnabotna Township, Atchison County, Missouri, United States. The population was 61 at the 2020 census. It is the westernmost settlement in the state of Missouri, about 120 miles northwest of Kansas City.

== History ==
Watson was platted in 1869. and incorporated in 1874. The village was named after a railroad official. A post office was established at Watson in 1869, and remained in operation until 1965.

== Geography ==
According to the United States Census Bureau, the village has a total area of 0.11 square miles (0.28 km^{2}), all land.

Watson is located in the Missouri River Valley at the junction of the Burlington Northern Railroad and Missouri Route A. It is approximately 7 miles northwest of Rock Port and 8 miles south-southeast of Hamburg, Iowa. Peru, Nebraska lies about 5.5 west across the Missouri River. It is the closest settlement in Missouri to McKissick Island.

== Demographics ==
Historical population
Census	Pop.	Note	%±
1870	75		—
1880	213		184.0%
1890	238		11.7%
1900	233		−2.1%
1910	245		5.2%
1920	227		−7.3%
1930	223		−1.8%
1940	269		20.6%
1950	199		−26.0%
1960	181		−9.0%
1970	164		−9.4%
1980	171		4.3%
1990	137		−19.9%
2000	121		−11.7%
2010	100		−17.4%
2020	61		−39.0%
U.S. Decennial Census

=== 2010 census ===
As of the census of 2010, there were 100 people, 40 households, and 28 families living in the village. The population density was 909.1 inhabitants per square mile (351.0/km^{2}). There were 47 housing units at an average density of 427.3 per square mile (165.0/km^{2}). The racial makeup of the village was 100.0% White.

There were 40 households, of which 30.0% had children under the age of 18 living with them, 50.0% were married couples living together, 12.5% had a female householder with no husband present, 7.5% had a male householder with no wife present, and 30.0% were non-families. 25.0% of all households were made up of individuals, and 7.5% had someone living alone who was 65 years of age or older. The average household size was 2.50 and the average family size was 2.96.

The median age in the village was 38.7 years. 21% of residents were under the age of 18; 10% were between the ages of 18 and 24; 25% were from 25 to 44; 29% were from 45 to 64; and 15% were 65 years of age or older. The gender makeup of the village was 54.0% male and 46.0% female.

=== 2000 census ===
As of the census of 2000, there were 121 people, 40 households, and 32 families living in the village. The population density was 1,136.4 inhabitants per square mile (438.8/km^{2}). There were 58 housing units at an average density of 544.7 per square mile (210.3/km^{2}). The racial makeup of the village was 99.17% White, and 0.83% from two or more races. Hispanic or Latino of any race were 2.48% of the population.

There were 40 households, out of which 42.5% had children under the age of 18 living with them, 70.0% were married couples living together, 10.0% had a female householder with no husband present, and 20.0% were non-families. 17.5% of all households were made up of individuals, and 5.0% had someone living alone who was 65 years of age or older. The average household size was 3.03 and the average family size was 3.38.

In the village, the population was spread out, with 26.4% under the age of 18, 12.4% from 18 to 24, 22.3% from 25 to 44, 29.8% from 45 to 64, and 9.1% who were 65 years of age or older. The median age was 39 years. For every 100 females, there were 120.0 males. For every 100 females age 18 and over, there were 128.2 males.

The median income for a household in the village was $27,750, and the median income for a family was $28,500. Males had a median income of $28,594 versus $23,000 for females. The per capita income for the village was $13,753. There were 9.4% of families and 7.4% of the population living below the poverty line, including 15.2% of under eighteens and none of those over 64.

== Education ==
It is in the Rock Port R-II School District. Rock Port High School is the zoned comprehensive high school.

== Notable person ==
Current Missouri Supreme Court Judge Zel Fischer grew up in Watson.
