= Milton, Atchison County, Missouri =

Extinct hamlet in northwest Missouri, U.S.

Coordinates: 40°17′05″N 95°25′02″W

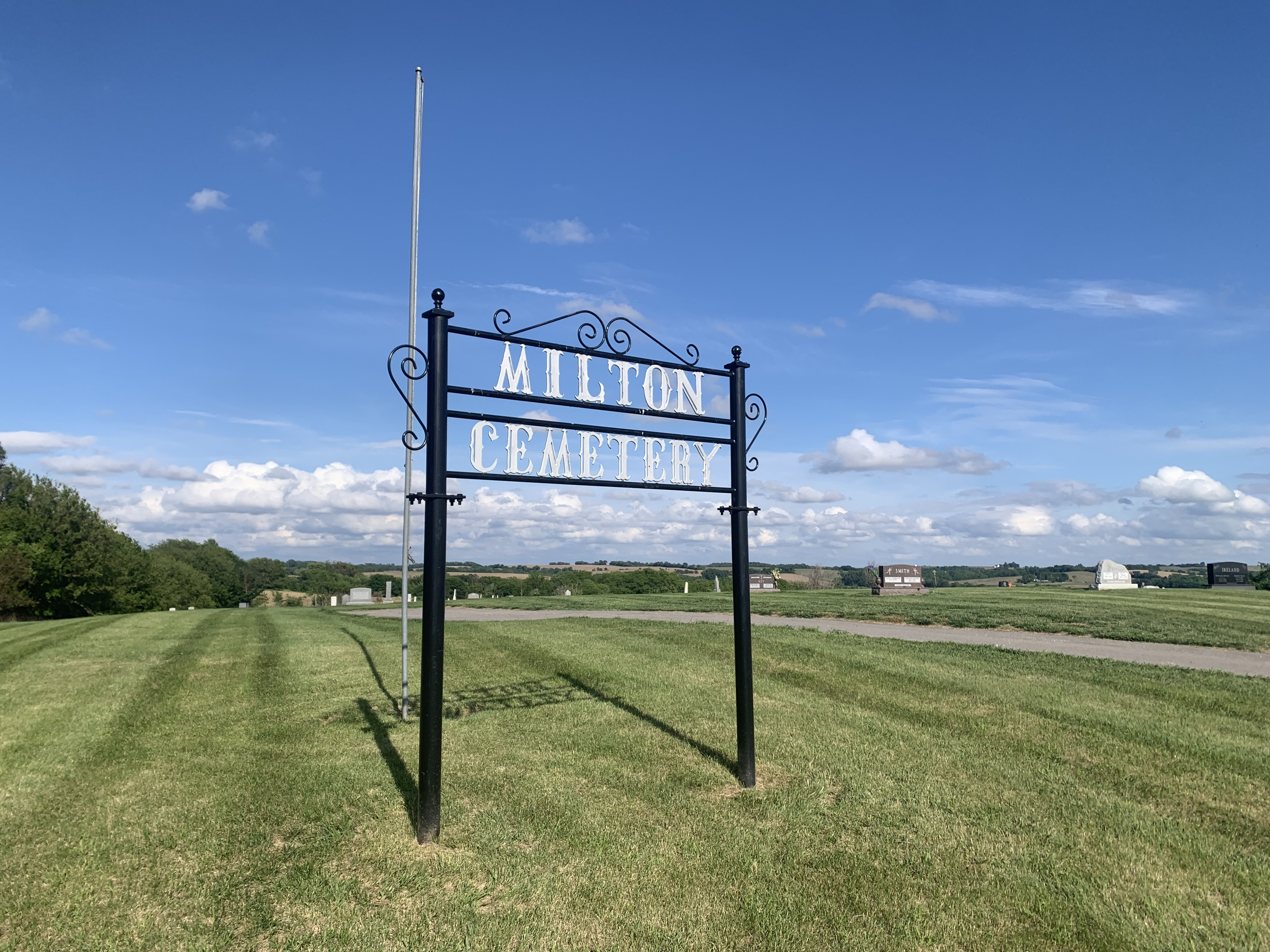
Milton Cemetery in south Clark Township at Milton, Missouri

Milton is an extinct hamlet in southern Atchison County, in the U.S. state of Missouri. It was a recognized village located along the Tarkio River. A railroad station named Milton was located on the east side of the Tarkio Valley Line but the hamlet was located a half-mile west.

== History ==
A post office called Milton was established in 1877, and remained in operation until 1908. The origin of the name Milton is obscure. In 1915 the population was about 50.
