= Center Grove, Missouri =

Extinct hamlet in northwest Missouri, U.S.

Coordinates: 40°31′28″N 95°19′02″W

Center Grove is an extinct hamlet in Atchison County, in the U.S. state of Missouri. The GNIS classifies it as a populated place, but the precise location of the town site is unknown. According to an 1861 map, it was located east of Linden along Rock Creek.

A post office called Center Grove was established in 1858, and remained in operation until 1866. The community was named for its location at the geographical center of Lincoln Township. Additionally, it was considered central compared to the other settlements at the time: Irish Grove, Lost Grove, and Walden Grove.
