= Westboro, Missouri =

City in Atchison County, Missouri, United States

- City
- Location of Westboro, Missouri
- Coordinates: 40°32′06″N 95°19′16″W
- Country: United States
- State: Missouri
- County: Atchison
- Township: Lincoln

Area
  - Total: 0.25 sq mi (0.66 km^{2})
  - Land: 0.25 sq mi (0.66 km^{2})
  - Water: 0 sq mi (0.00 km^{2})
- Elevation: 1,001 ft (305 m)

Population (2020)
  - Total: 116
  - Density: 458.2/sq mi (176.91/km^{2})
- Time zone: UTC-6 (Central (CST))
  - Summer (DST): UTC-5 (CDT)
- ZIP code: 64498
- Area code: 660
- FIPS code: 29-78622
- GNIS feature ID: 2397277

Westboro is a city in Lincoln Township, Atchison County, Missouri, United States. The population was 116 at the 2020 census.

== History ==
Westboro was laid out in 1881 and incorporated in 1882. The name Westboro was selected by railroad officials. A post office has been in operation at Westboro since 1881.

== Geography ==
According to the United States Census Bureau, the city has a total area of 0.25 square miles (0.65 km^{2}), all land.

Missouri Routes C and O service the town and the Middle Tarkio Creek passes on the east side of the town. Northboro, Iowa is about 5 miles (8.0 km) north-northeast, Blanchard, Iowa lies 6 miles (9.7 km) northeast, and Tarkio is about 7 miles (11 km) southwest.

== Demographics ==
Historical population
Census	Pop.	Note	%±
1890	216		—
1900	303		40.3%
1910	333		9.9%
1920	311		−6.6%
1930	358		15.1%
1940	368		2.8%
1950	297		−19.3%
1960	262		−11.8%
1970	234		−10.7%
1980	188		−19.7%
1990	182		−3.2%
2000	163		−10.4%
2010	141		−13.5%
2020	116		−17.7%
U.S. Decennial Census

=== 2010 census ===
As of the census of 2010, there were 141 people, 56 households, and 39 families living in the city. The population density was 564.0 inhabitants per square mile (217.8/km^{2}). There were 71 housing units at an average density of 284.0 per square mile (109.7/km^{2}). The racial makeup of the city was 100.0% White. Hispanic or Latino of any race were 2.1% of the population.

There were 56 households, of which 32.1% had children under the age of 18 living with them, 55.4% were married couples living together, 8.9% had a female householder with no husband present, 5.4% had a male householder with no wife present, and 30.4% were non-families. 23.2% of all households were made up of individuals, and 7.2% had someone living alone who was 65 years of age or older. The average household size was 2.52 and the average family size was 3.03.

The median age in the city was 40.5 years. 22.7% of residents were under the age of 18; 9.2% were between the ages of 18 and 24; 29% were from 25 to 44; 25.6% were from 45 to 64; and 13.5% were 65 years of age or older. The gender makeup of the city was 50.4% male and 49.6% female.

=== 2000 census ===
As of the census of 2000, there were 163 people, 66 households, and 47 families living in the city. The population density was 808.8 inhabitants per square mile (312.3/km^{2}). There were 80 housing units at an average density of 396.9 per square mile (153.2/km^{2}). The racial makeup of the city was 95.71% White, 3.07% from other races, and 1.23% from two or more races. Hispanic or Latino of any race were 4.29% of the population.

There were 66 households, out of which 37.9% had children under the age of 18 living with them, 60.6% were married couples living together, 10.6% had a female householder with no husband present, and 27.3% were non-families. 25.8% of all households were made up of individuals, and 9.1% had someone living alone who was 65 years of age or older. The average household size was 2.47 and the average family size was 2.98.

In the city the population was spread out, with 31.3% under the age of 18, 3.1% from 18 to 24, 28.2% from 25 to 44, 24.5% from 45 to 64, and 12.9% who were 65 years of age or older. The median age was 36 years. For every 100 females, there were 81.1 males. For every 100 females age 18 and over, there were 83.6 males.

The median income for a household in the city was $31,563, and the median income for a family was $32,813. Males had a median income of $23,750 versus $16,563 for females. The per capita income for the city was $12,466. About 7.3% of families and 8.4% of the population were below the poverty line, including 14.3% of those under the age of eighteen and none of those 65 or over.

== Education ==
It is in the Tarkio R-I School District.

The Westboro R-IV school district served the children of Westboro from 1882 to 1995. Westboro High school closed in 1967 and the district began to send High school students to Tarkio. The following year Westboro began to send junior high students to Tarkio as well. The district maintained a K-6 program until 1995 when the district voted to be annexed by Tarkio due to financial issues.

== Notable people ==
Merton F. Utter (1917–1980), a microbiologist and biochemist, was born in Westboro.

== See also ==
- List of cities in Missouri
