= Lincoln Township, Atchison County, Missouri =

Township in Atchison County, Missouri, U.S.

Lincoln Township
- Township
- Coordinates: 40°31′38″N 95°19′13″W
- Country: United States
- State: Missouri
- County: Atchison

Area
  - Total: 82.88 sq mi (214.7 km^{2})
  - Land: 82.87 sq mi (214.6 km^{2})
  - Water: 0.01 sq mi (0.026 km^{2}) 0.01%
- Elevation: 1,007 ft (307 m)

Population (2020)
  - Total: 359
  - Density: 4.3/sq mi (1.7/km^{2})
- FIPS code: 29-00542590
- GNIS feature ID: 766236

Lincoln Township is a township in Atchison County, Missouri, United States. At the 2020 census, its population was 359.

Lincoln Township was established on November 22, 1871, and named after Abraham Lincoln, 16th President of the United States.

== Geography ==
Lincoln Township covers an area of 82.88 square miles (214.7 km^{2}), making it the largest in the county. It contains one incorporated settlement, Westboro, near its center. The unincorporated community of South Blanchard is located in the very northeast of the township on the Iowa-Missouri border. A hamlet called Hazel Grove was located in the northeast of the township. It contains three cemeteries: Center Grove, Long Branch, and Walden Grove (also known as Waldrens Grove).

The streams of Long Branch, Mill Creek, and Squaw Creek run through this township.

== Transportation ==
The following highways travel through the township:

- U.S. Route 59
- Route B
- Route C
- Route M
- Route O
