= McKissick Island =

Former island in southeastern Nebraska, U.S.

Coordinates: 40°32′23″N 95°40′25″W

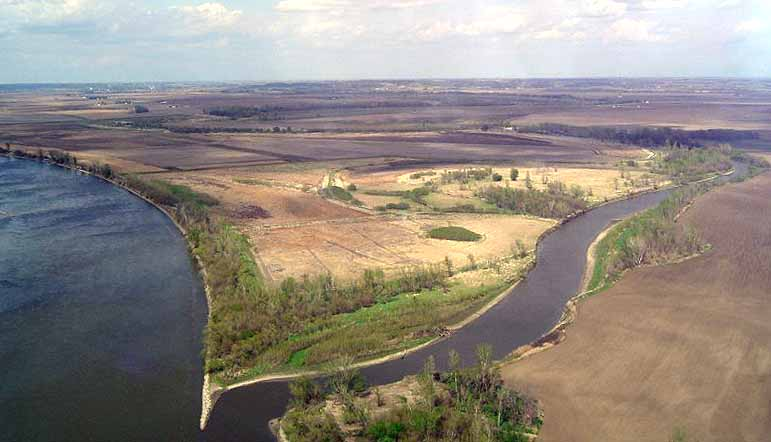
View from the south showing confluence of the Nishnabotna River with the Missouri River. The southeastern side of the island is roughly bordered by the bed of the Nishnabotna River. The Nishnabotna itself now flows from Missouri briefly through McKissick Island, Nebraska, and back into Missouri before hitting the mouth. McKissick Island is further back in this photo.

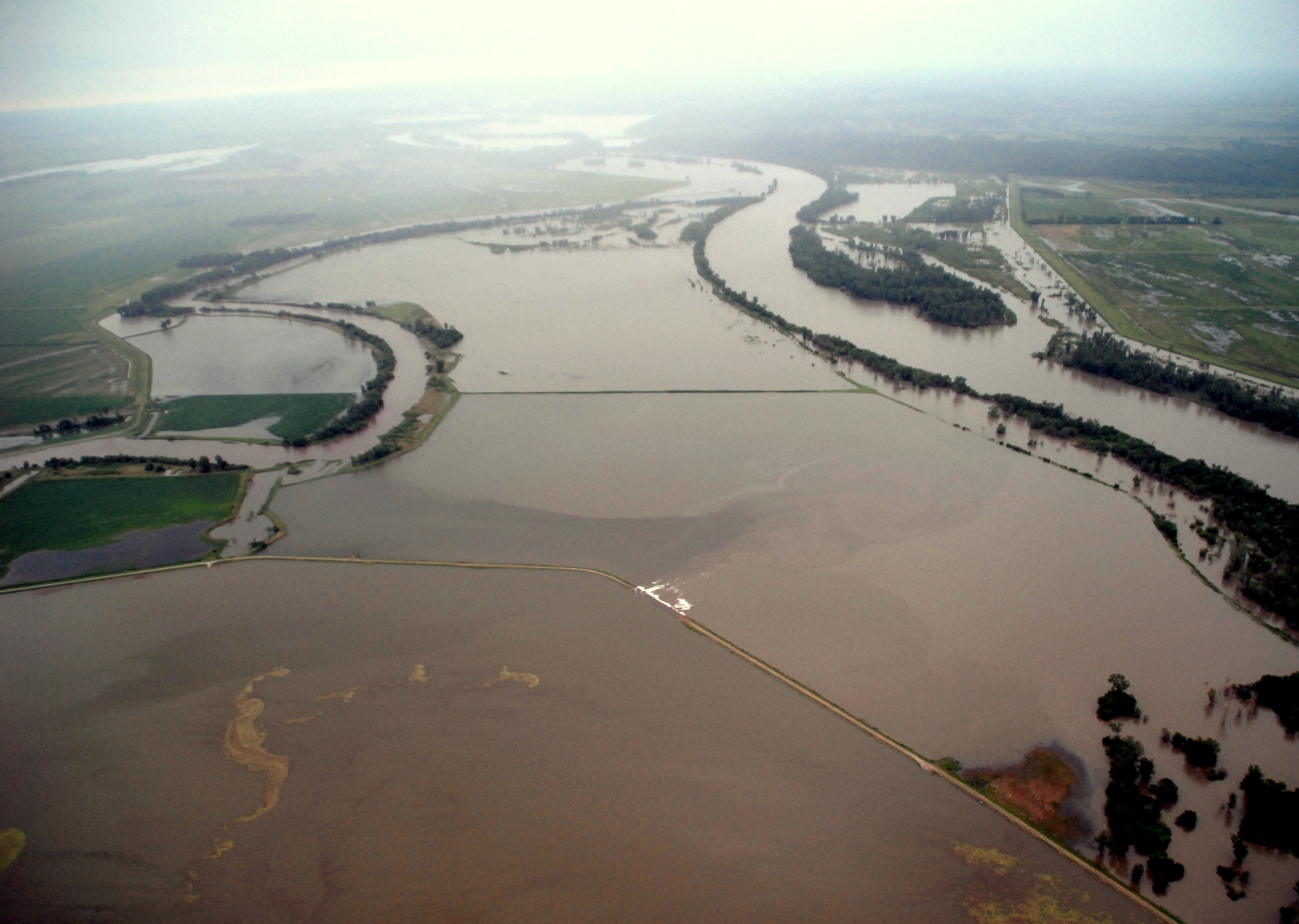
View from the north during the 2011 Missouri River flood. The entire island is inundated. The point where the Nishnabotna on the left makes a curve to the right is where the Nishnabotna flows in and out of the island.

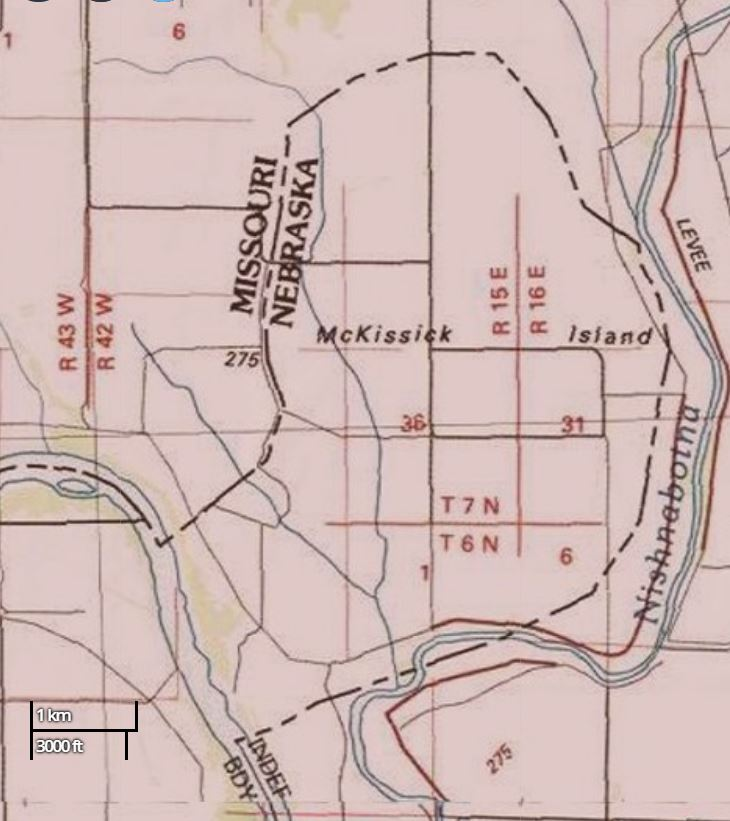
Section of the USGS topographic map of the area

McKissick Island (also known as McKissick's Island) is a former island in the Missouri River that is part of Nemaha County, Nebraska, United States. It is now fully east of the river, which is Nebraska's normal eastern border, and it can only be reached by land from mainland Nebraska by first going through Missouri.

It is sometimes described as a Nebraska enclave within Missouri, although it is not a true enclave, since it is physically attached to Nebraska through the river. It is more accurately described as a pene-exclave or practical exclave.

A dispute over whether Missouri or Nebraska had jurisdiction was determined in a 1904 United States Supreme Court decision, but it was not until 1999 that the two states entered an interstate compact, with the approval of the United States Congress, that enacted the boundary into law.

The area is about 5,000 acres in size and has always had a small population. As of 2006 it was reported that only one house was on the island. The only road sign on it uses the Nemaha County street grid of 647A Avenue and 739A Road rather than the Atchison County, Missouri grid which surrounds it.

== Name ==
The island derives its name from the McKissick family, who bought land in the area in the 1840s before Missouri's borders with Nebraska and Iowa had been finalized with those states' entry into the union. The family were among the first settlers of Fremont County, Iowa, where they founded McKissick's Grove about one mile north of the McKissick Island, thinking it was in Missouri. When Iowa entered the union in 1846, that grove near today's Hamburg, Iowa was determined to be in Iowa.

The McKissicks moved to California in 1861.

The island is officially called McKissick Island on the Geographic Names Information System. The island is northeast of the line that otherwise forms Nemaha County/Otoe County, but is considered a precinct (equivalent of a township) of Nemaha County. Maps interchangeably refer to it under both McKissick Island and McKissick's Island. The Supreme Court ruling uses the name McKissick's Island.

== History ==
A map of the river attributed to Robert E. Lee in 1837 showed the island on the Nebraska side.

On March 1, 1867, Nebraska entered the union with officially recognized boundaries including McKissick's Island. Missouri had extended its border to the Missouri River in northwest Missouri in 1836 in the Platte Purchase and did not claim the island when those borders were drawn.

On April 24, 1867, the 1867 Manhattan, Kansas earthquake (5.1 on the Richter magnitude scale) occurred 130 miles from the island, shaking Missouri, Kansas, Nebraska and Iowa. The quake was near the Nemaha Ridge. While there was no reported direct connection to the earthquake and the rerouting of the Missouri River, some residents have said it may have contributed.

On July 5, 1867, a little more than four months after Nebraska entered the union, a flood avulsion dug out the slough on the west side of the island, straightening its flow around the oxbow meander. The channel separating it from mainland Nebraska deepened following an 1880s flood. In the meantime, the riverbed that had flowed to the east of the river dried up, and the land became tillable and de facto connected by land to Missouri, while those from Nebraska had to access it by ferry (no bridges had been built nearby at the time).

In 1895 the county surveyors of Nemaha County and Atchison County surveyed the abandoned bed of the Missouri River.

On February 24, 1904, Missouri filed a claim with the Supreme Court claiming jurisdiction. Nebraska filed a cross suit. Missouri argued that when Congress approved the extension of borders under the Platte Purchase, the border was to be the middle of the river (although the border was not surveyed at the time). Nebraska argued that its borders were surveyed when it entered the union.

Justice John Marshall Harlan delivered the opinion, saying, "The question is well settled at common law, that the person whose land is bounded by a stream of water, which changes its course gradually by alluvial formations, shall still hold by the same boundary, including the accumulated soil. No other rule can be applied on just principles. Every proprietor whose land is thus bounded is subject to loss by the same means which may add to his territory; and as he is without remedy for his loss, in this way, he cannot be held accountable for his gain."

The court told the states to either accept the boundaries surveyed in 1895 or ask for a new survey. The boundary was not further defined until 1999 when the states agreed to have Midland Surveying, Inc. conduct the survey. This in turn led to the Missouri-Nebraska Compact, which the states and Congress approved in 1999.

The two closest Missouri River bridges offering access were built in the 1930s when the northerly route via Waubonsie Bridge (subsequently replaced by the Nebraska City Bridge) in 1930 and the southerly route through the Brownville Bridge opened in 1939. The Nebraska City route requires one to travel through Otoe County, cross into Iowa and then come back through Missouri. The Brownville Bridge (which was actually paid for by Atchison County) connects Nemaha County and Atchison County at Brownville, Nebraska. Prior to the 1920s the only non-rail land access between the sides involved either going to Omaha, Nebraska to the Ak-Sar-Ben Bridge or to Kansas City, Missouri to the ASB Bridge.

The island at various times had a Methodist church (built in 1897) and a school. In 1907 it had "30 families with 56 children, 36 of which were enrolled in school. In 1966 there were seven families living there, and a contract with the Hamburg, Iowa, schools provided for the education of the eleven pupils living on the island then." The old school house was used as a polling place. The Hamburg school meant that students had to travel from Nebraska and go through Missouri before attending school in Iowa.

Most of the island's land was under 2 to 10 feet of water during the 2011 Missouri River Flood, as levees protecting it from the Missouri failed.
