= Blanchard, Missouri =

Census-designated place in Atchison County, Missouri, United States

- Census-designated place
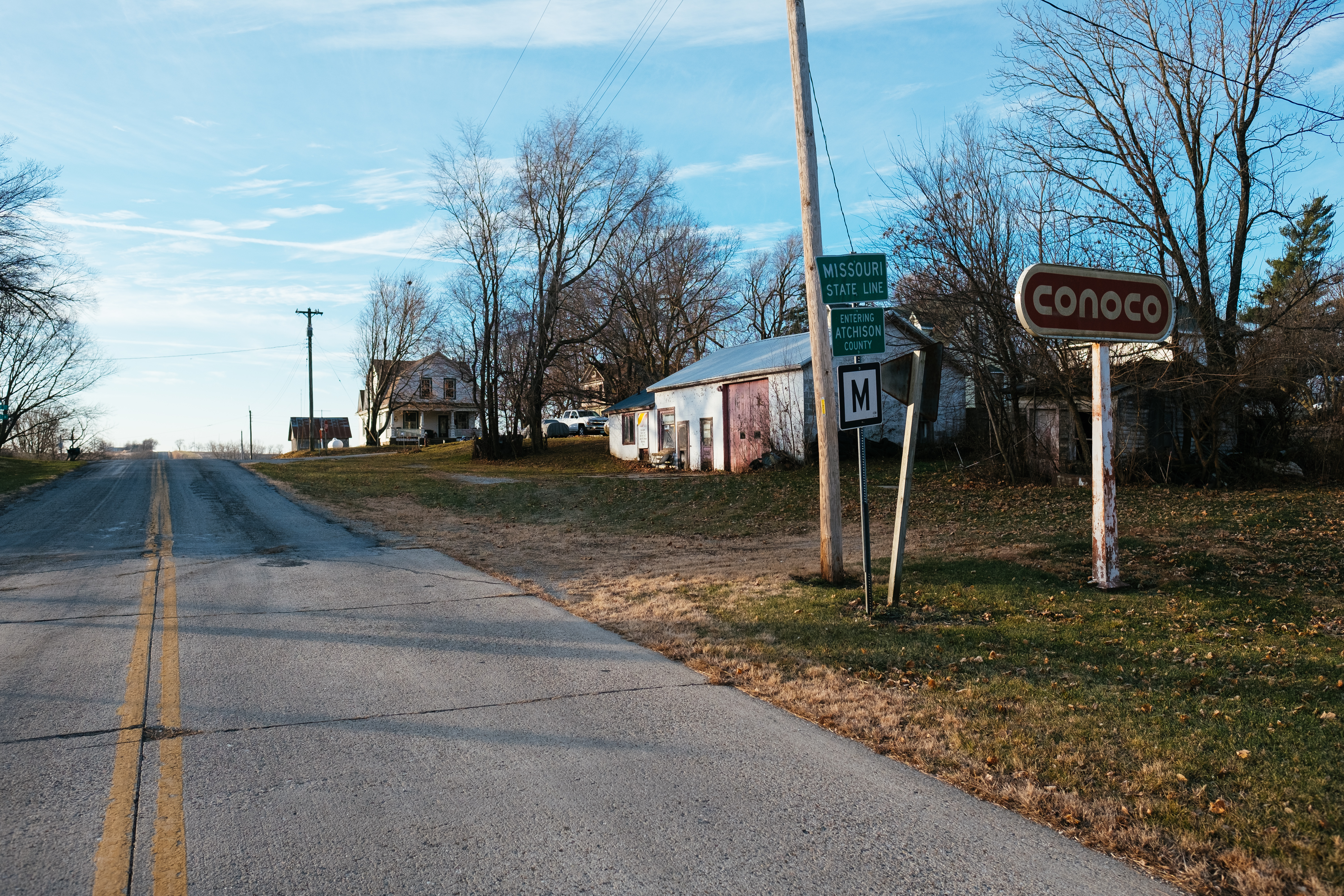
- Missouri State Line entering South Blanchard
- Nickname: South Blanchard
- Location within Missouri
- Coordinates: 40°34′30″N 95°12′40″W
- Country: United States
- State: Missouri
- County: Atchison
- Township: Lincoln

Area
  - Total: 0.53 sq mi (1.37 km^{2})
  - Land: 0.53 sq mi (1.37 km^{2})
  - Water: 0 sq mi (0.00 km^{2})
- Elevation: 1,034 ft (315 m)

Population (2021 estimate)
  - Total: 31
  - Density: 58.6/sq mi (22.63/km^{2})
- Time zone: UTC-6 (Central (CST))
  - Summer (DST): UTC-5 (CDT)
- ZIP Code: 64498
- Area code: 660
- GNIS feature ID: 2587055

Blanchard is a census-designated place (CDP) in Atchison County, Missouri, United States. As of a 2021 estimate, its population was 31. The community is located on the Iowa border and is adjacent to the city of Blanchard, Iowa. It has sometimes been known as "South Blanchard".

== Demographics ==
Historical population
Census	Pop.	Note	%±
2020	27		—
U.S. Decennial Census

== Education ==
It is in the Tarkio R-I School District.

== See also ==
- List of census-designated places in Missouri
