= Atchison County, Missouri =

County in Missouri, United States

- County
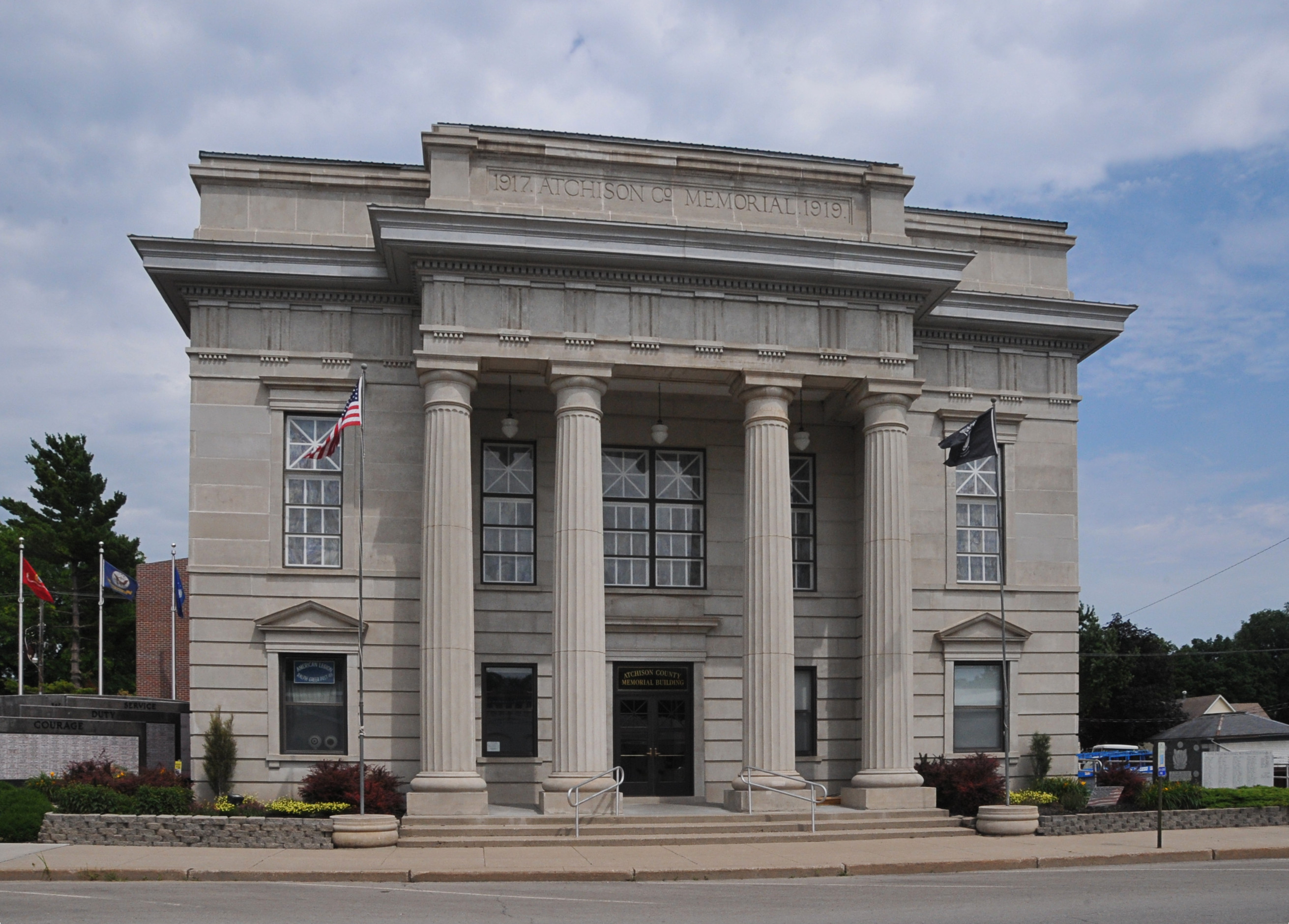
- Atchison County Memorial Building

- Location within the U.S. state of Missouri
- Coordinates: 40°26′N 95°26′W
- Country: United States
- State: Missouri
- Founded: February 14, 1845
- Named for: David Rice Atchison
- Seat: Rock Port
- Largest city: Tarkio

Area
  - Total: 550 sq mi (1,400 km^{2})
  - Land: 547 sq mi (1,420 km^{2})
  - Water: 2.8 sq mi (7.3 km^{2}) 0.5%

Population (2020)
  - Total: 5,305
  - Estimate (2025): 5,175 ▼
  - Density: 9.70/sq mi (3.74/km^{2})
- Time zone: UTC−6 (Central)
  - Summer (DST): UTC−5 (CDT)
- Congressional district: 6th
- Website: www.atchisoncounty.org (Note: The website is operated by the Atchison County Development Corporation, a development organization, rather than by the Atchison County government.)

Atchison County is a county located in the northwestern corner of the U.S. state of Missouri. As of the 2020 census, the county had a population of 5,305. Its county seat is Rock Port. It was originally known as Allen County when it was detached from Holt County in 1843. The county was officially organized on February 14, 1845, and named for U.S. Senator David Rice Atchison from Missouri.

== Geography ==
According to the U.S. Census Bureau, the county has a total area of 550 square miles (1,400 km^{2}), of which 547 square miles (1,420 km^{2}) is land and 2.8 square miles (7.3 km^{2}) (0.5%) is water.

Atchison's western boundary for the most part is the Missouri River and Nebraska. An 1867 flood straightened a bend in the river north of Watson. Both Nebraska and Missouri claimed the 5,000 acre McKissick Island that extends almost two miles into Atchison County. The Supreme Court in 1904 decided that the land belongs to Nebraska. The only way Nebraskans can reach it by road is to cross the Missouri River and then travel through Missouri.

The State Line Slough (Missouri) stream is in Atchison County.

=== Adjacent counties ===
- Fremont County, Iowa (north)
- Page County, Iowa (northeast)
- Nodaway County (east)
- Holt County (south)
- Richardson County, Nebraska (southwest)
- Nemaha County, Nebraska (west)
- Otoe County, Nebraska (northwest)

=== Major highways ===
- Interstate 29
- U.S. Route 59
- U.S. Route 136
- U.S. Route 275
- Route 46
- Route 111

=== Transit ===
- Jefferson Lines

== Demographics ==
Historical population
Census	Pop.	Note	%±
1850	1,678		—
1860	4,649		177.1%
1870	8,440		81.5%
1880	14,556		72.5%
1890	15,533		6.7%
1900	16,501		6.2%
1910	13,604		−17.6%
1920	13,008		−4.4%
1930	13,421		3.2%
1940	12,897		−3.9%
1950	11,127		−13.7%
1960	9,213		−17.2%
1970	9,240		0.3%
1980	8,605		−6.9%
1990	7,457		−13.3%
2000	6,430		−13.8%
2010	5,685		−11.6%
2020	5,305		−6.7%
2025 (est.)	5,175	▼	−2.5%
U.S. Decennial Census; 1790-1960 1900-1990; 1990-2000 2010-2015

=== 2020 census ===
Atchison County, Missouri – Racial and ethnic composition Note: the US Census treats Hispanic/Latino as an ethnic category. This table excludes Latinos from the racial categories and assigns them to a separate category. Hispanics/Latinos may be of any race.
Race / Ethnicity (NH = Non-Hispanic)	Pop 1980	Pop 1990	Pop 2000	Pop 2010	Pop 2020	% 1980	% 1990	% 2000	% 2010	% 2020
White alone (NH)	8,486	7,238	6,211	5,556	4,983	98.62%	97.06%	96.59%	97.73%	93.93%
Black or African American alone (NH)	44	82	132	17	22	0.51%	1.10%	2.05%	0.30%	0.41%
Native American or Alaska Native alone (NH)	2	14	12	9	25	0.02%	0.19%	0.19%	0.16%	0.47%
Asian alone (NH)	6	14	9	9	7	0.07%	0.19%	0.14%	0.16%	0.13%
Native Hawaiian or Pacific Islander alone (NH)	x	x	0	3	0	x	x	0.00%	0.05%	0.00%
Other race alone (NH)	11	5	3	0	14	0.13%	0.07%	0.05%	0.00%	0.26%
Mixed race or Multiracial (NH)	x	x	20	36	181	x	x	0.31%	0.63%	3.41%
Hispanic or Latino (any race)	56	104	43	55	73	0.65%	1.39%	0.67%	0.97%	1.38%
Total	8,605	7,457	6,430	5,685	5,305	100.00%	100.00%	100.00%	100.00%	100.00%

As of the 2020 census, the county had a population of 5,305. The median age was 46.1 years. 21.4% of residents were under the age of 18 and 25.0% of residents were 65 years of age or older. For every 100 females there were 98.5 males, and for every 100 females age 18 and over there were 96.0 males age 18 and over. 0.0% of residents lived in urban areas, while 100.0% lived in rural areas.

The racial makeup of the county was 94.4% White, 0.4% Black or African American, 0.5% American Indian and Alaska Native, 0.2% Asian, 0.0% Native Hawaiian and Pacific Islander, 0.6% from some other race, and 4.0% from two or more races. Hispanic or Latino residents of any race comprised 1.4% of the population.

There were 2,335 households in the county, of which 26.2% had children under the age of 18 living with them and 23.9% had a female householder with no spouse or partner present. About 32.9% of all households were made up of individuals and 16.8% had someone living alone who was 65 years of age or older.

There were 2,731 housing units, of which 14.5% were vacant. Among occupied housing units, 71.2% were owner-occupied and 28.8% were renter-occupied. The homeowner vacancy rate was 2.1% and the rental vacancy rate was 10.9%.

=== 2000 census ===
As of the census of 2000, there were 6,430 people, 2,722 households, and 1,777 families residing in the county. The population density was 12 people per square mile (4.6 people/km^{2}). There were 3,103 housing units at an average density of 6 units per square mile (2.3 units/km^{2}). The racial makeup of the county was 97.00% White, 2.05% Black or African American, 0.19% Native American, 0.14% Asian, 0.31% from other races, and 0.31% from two or more races. Approximately 0.67% of the population were Hispanic or Latino of any race.

There were 2,722 households, out of which 26.60% had children under the age of 18 living with them, 55.80% were married couples living together, 6.10% had a female householder with no husband present, and 34.70% were non-families. 31.50% of all households were made up of individuals, and 17.60% had someone living alone who was 65 years of age or older. The average household size was 2.25 and the average family size was 2.82.

In the county, the population was spread out, with 24.10% under the age of 18, 6.50% from 18 to 24, 24.20% from 25 to 44, 24.20% from 45 to 64, and 21.10% who were 65 years of age or older. The median age was 42 years. For every 100 females there were 99.30 males. For every 100 females age 18 and over, there were 91.90 males.

The median income for a household in the county was $30,959, and the median income for a family was $38,279. Males had a median income of $27,468 versus $18,855 for females. The per capita income for the county was $16,956. About 9.30% of families and 11.60% of the population were below the poverty line, including 13.70% of those under age 18 and 12.40% of those age 65 or over.

=== Religion ===
According to the Association of Religion Data Archives County Membership Report (2010), Atchison County is sometimes regarded as being on the northern edge of the Bible Belt, although mainline Protestantism is the most predominant religion. The most predominant denominations among residents in Atchison County who adhere to a religion are United Methodists (29.93%), Lutherans (LCMC) (22.16%), and Southern Baptists (14.33%).

== Energy ==
The county derives most of its energy from wind power, with the amount produced exceeding its needs. Several turbines installed by Wind Capital Group, with investment from the John Deere Company, generated an estimated 16 million kilowatt hours of energy a year in 2008. As of 2025, there are 342 wind turbines in the county.

== Education ==
=== Public schools ===
School districts include:

- Fairfax R-III School District – Fairfax
  - Fairfax Elementary School (PK-06)
  - Fairfax High School (07–12)
- Rock Port R-II School District – Rock Port
  - Rock Port Elementary School (K-05)
  - Rock Port High School (06–12)
- Tarkio R-I School District – Tarkio
  - Tarkio Elementary School (PK-05)
  - Tarkio Middle School (06–08)
  - Tarkio High School (09–12)

=== Private schools ===
- Tarkio Academy – Tarkio (07–12) – Nonsectarian (All Boys) - closed
- Tarkio Technology Institute - Tarkio – vocational school on the defunct Tarkio College campus, Official website

=== Public libraries ===
- Atchison County Library

== Communities ==
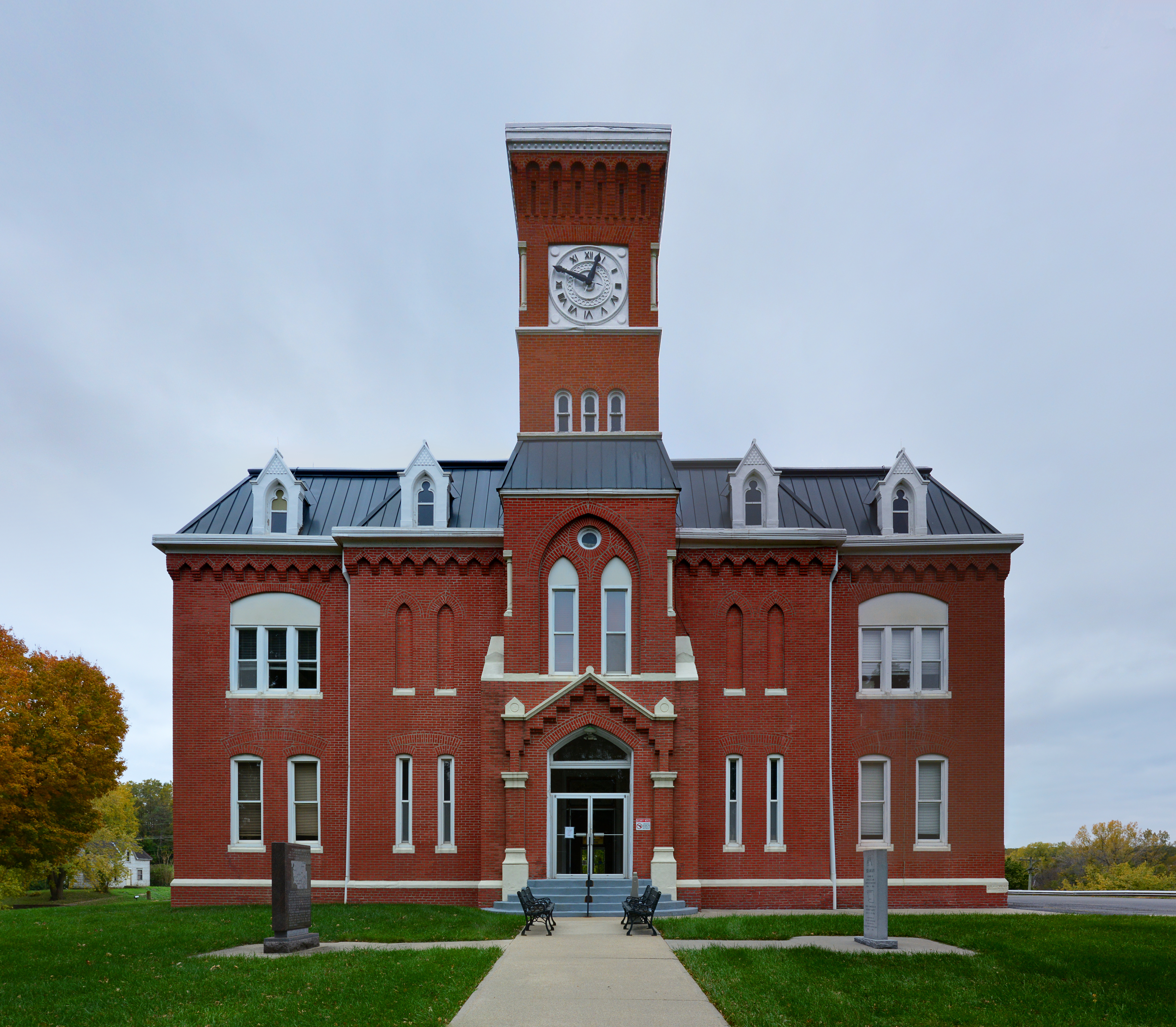
Atchison County Courthouse in Rock Port

=== Cities ===
- Fairfax
- Rock Port (county seat)
- Tarkio
- Westboro

=== Village ===
- Watson

=== Census-designated place ===
- Blanchard

=== Unincorporated communities ===
- Dotham
- Langdon
- Linden
- Milton
- Phelps City
- York

=== Townships ===
Atchison County is divided into 11 townships:

- Benton
- Buchanan
- Clark
- Clay
- Colfax
- Dale
- Lincoln
- Nishnabotna
- Polk
- Tarkio
- Templeton

=== Population ranking ===
The population ranking of the following table is based on the 2020 census of Atchison County.

† county seat

Rank	Name	Municipal Type	Population
1	Tarkio	4th Class City	1,506
2	Rock Port †	4th Class City	1,278
3	Fairfax	4th Class City	648
4	Westboro	4th Class City	116
5	Watson	Village	61
6	Blanchard	CDP	27

== Notable people ==
- Michael J. Burg - Actor
- Zel Fischer - Missouri Supreme Court Justice
- Sam Graves - U.S. Representative for Missouri's 6th Congressional District

== Politics ==
=== Local ===
The Republican Party controls politics at the local level in Atchison County. Republicans hold all but one of the elected positions in the county.

Atchison County, Missouri

Elected countywide officials
Assessor	Rochelle Moore Long	Republican
Circuit Clerk	Thyra Davis Beckman	Republican
County Clerk	Susette M. Taylor	Republican
Collector	Diane Livengood	Republican
Commissioner (presiding)	Curtis Livengood	Republican
Commissioner (district 1)	James Quimby	Republican
Commissioner (district 2)	Richard C. Burke	Democratic
Coroner	Shawn Minter Jr.	Republican
Prosecuting Attorney	Brett Hurst	Republican
Public Administrator	Teresa Jayne Scott	Republican
Recorder	Eliza Beasing	Republican
Sheriff	Dennis D. Martin	Republican
Treasurer	Debbie True	Republican

=== State ===
Past Gubernatorial Elections Results
Year	Republican	Democratic	Third Parties
2024	81.05% 2,125	16.29% 427	2.67% 70
2020	78.38% 2,171	19.24% 533	2.38% 66
2016	65.22% 1,746	31.45% 842	3.33% 89
2012	49.83% 1,319	46.85% 1,240	3.32% 88
2008	45.93% 1,336	50.22% 1,461	3.85% 112
2004	63.65% 1,973	34.90% 1,082	1.45% 45
2000	57.05% 1,610	41.42% 1,169	1.53% 43
1996	37.36% 1,111	61.13% 1,818	1.51% 45
1992	50.70% 1,604	49.30% 1,560	0.00% 0

All of Atchison County is a part of Missouri's 1st District in the Missouri House of Representatives and is represented by Jeff Farnan (R-Stanberry).

Missouri House of Representatives — District 1 — Atchison County (2022)
Party	Candidate	Votes	%	±%
Republican	Jeff Farnan	1,475	77.02%	−22.98
Democratic	Jess Piper	440	22.98%	+22.98

Missouri's House of Representatives — District 1 — Atchison County (2020)
Party	Candidate	Votes	%	±%
Republican	Allen Andrews	2,575	100.00%	+17.73

Missouri House of Representatives — District 1 — Atchison County (2018)
Party	Candidate	Votes	%	±%
Republican	Allen Andrews	1,819	82.27%	−17.73
Democratic	Paul Taylor	392	17.73%	+17.73

All of Atchison County is a part of Missouri's 12th District in the Missouri Senate and is currently represented by Rusty Black (R-Chillicothe).

Missouri Senate — District 12 — Atchison County (2022)
Party	Candidate	Votes	%	±%
Republican	Rusty Black	1,591	82.86%	+4.23
Democratic	Michael J. Baumli	329	17.14%	−4.23

Missouri Senate — District 12 — Atchison County (2018)
Party	Candidate	Votes	%	±%
Republican	Dan Hegeman	1,722	78.63%	−21.37
Democratic	Terry Richard	468	21.37%	+21.37

Missouri Senate — District 12 — Atchison County (2014)
Party	Candidate	Votes	%	±%
Republican	Dan Hegeman	1,601	100.00%	

=== Federal ===
All of Atchison County is included in Missouri's 6th Congressional District and is currently represented by Sam Graves (R-Tarkio) in the U.S. House of Representatives. Graves was elected to a twelfth term in 2022 over Democratic challenger Henry Martin.

U.S. House of Representatives – Missouri’s 6th Congressional District – Atchison County (2022)
Party	Candidate	Votes	%	±%
Republican	Sam Graves	1,583	82.11%	+0.72
Democratic	Henry Martin	302	15.66%	−0.35
Libertarian	Edward A. "Andy" Maidment	43	2.23%	−0.37

U.S. House of Representatives – Missouri’s 6th Congressional District – Atchison County (2020)
Party	Candidate	Votes	%	±%
Republican	Sam Graves	2,257	81.39%	+4.53
Democratic	Gena L. Ross	444	16.01%	−3.66
Libertarian	Jim Higgins	72	2.60%	−0.87

U.S. House of Representatives – Missouri's 6th Congressional District – Atchison County (2018)
Party	Candidate	Votes	%	±%
Republican	Sam Graves	1,704	76.86%	−0.16
Democratic	Henry Robert Martin	436	19.67%	+0.20
Libertarian	Dan Hogan	77	3.47%	+0.97

Atchison County, along with the rest of the state of Missouri, is represented in the U.S. Senate by Josh Hawley (R-Columbia) and Eric Schmitt (R-Glendale).

U.S. Senate – Class III – Atchison County (2022)
Party	Candidate	Votes	%	±%
Republican	Eric Schmitt	1,468	76.44%	+6.87
Democratic	Trudy Busch Valentine	392	20.52%	−5.90
Libertarian	Jonathan Dine	32	1.68%	+1.01
Constitution	Paul Venable	18	0.94%	+0.94

U.S. Senate – Class I – Atchison County (2018)
Party	Candidate	Votes	%	±%
Republican	Josh Hawley	1,619	72.70%	+22.40
Democratic	Claire McCaskill	542	24.34%	−19.02
Libertarian	Japheth Campbell	36	1.62%	−4.72
Independent	Craig O'Dear	15	0.67%	
Green	Jo Crain	15	0.67%	+0.67

Blunt was elected to a second term in 2016 over then-Missouri Secretary of State Jason Kander.

U.S. Senate — Class III — Atchison County (2016)
Party	Candidate	Votes	%	±%
Republican	Roy Blunt	1,861	69.57%	+19.27
Democratic	Jason Kander	704	26.32%	−17.04
Libertarian	Jonathan Dine	72	2.69%	−3.35
Green	Johnathan McFarland	19	0.71%	+0.71
Constitution	Fred Ryman	19	0.71%	+0.71

==== Political culture ====
United States presidential election results for Atchison County, Missouri
Year	Republican		Democratic		Third party(ies)	
Year	No.	%	No.	%	No.	%
1888	1,554	46.17%	1,465	43.52%	347	10.31%
1892	1,093	31.98%	1,147	33.56%	1,178	34.46%
1896	1,587	40.64%	2,272	58.18%	46	1.18%
1900	1,767	45.99%	1,926	50.13%	149	3.88%
1904	1,839	52.75%	1,506	43.20%	141	4.04%
1908	1,700	49.66%	1,651	48.23%	72	2.10%
1912	1,138	34.52%	1,534	46.53%	625	18.96%
1916	1,626	48.12%	1,697	50.22%	56	1.66%
1920	3,236	58.69%	2,227	40.39%	51	0.92%
1924	2,710	49.26%	2,617	47.57%	174	3.16%
1928	3,239	55.98%	2,535	43.81%	12	0.21%
1932	2,155	37.12%	3,617	62.30%	34	0.59%
1936	3,044	46.81%	3,452	53.08%	7	0.11%
1940	3,322	52.25%	3,025	47.58%	11	0.17%
1944	2,803	55.83%	2,214	44.09%	4	0.08%
1948	2,190	46.67%	2,498	53.23%	5	0.11%
1952	3,259	61.53%	2,028	38.29%	10	0.19%
1956	2,774	54.45%	2,321	45.55%	0	0.00%
1960	2,659	55.10%	2,167	44.90%	0	0.00%
1964	1,653	36.55%	2,870	63.45%	0	0.00%
1968	2,206	51.36%	1,752	40.79%	337	7.85%
1972	2,927	65.98%	1,509	34.02%	0	0.00%
1976	1,960	49.87%	1,926	49.01%	44	1.12%
1980	2,096	58.94%	1,273	35.80%	187	5.26%
1984	2,277	65.13%	1,219	34.87%	0	0.00%
1988	1,761	54.37%	1,468	45.32%	10	0.31%
1992	1,140	35.64%	1,208	37.76%	851	26.60%
1996	1,327	44.56%	1,266	42.51%	385	12.93%
2000	1,798	62.63%	1,013	35.28%	60	2.09%
2004	2,137	67.71%	1,005	31.84%	14	0.44%
2008	1,936	65.05%	1,000	33.60%	40	1.34%
2012	1,902	70.21%	756	27.91%	51	1.88%
2016	2,060	75.46%	541	19.82%	129	4.73%
2020	2,199	78.14%	564	20.04%	51	1.81%
2024	2,152	79.32%	529	19.50%	32	1.18%

At the presidential level, Atchison County is solidly Republican. Atchison County strongly favored Donald Trump in both 2016 and 2020. Bill Clinton was the last Democratic presidential nominee to carry Atchison County in 1992 with a plurality of the vote, and a Democrat hasn't won majority support from the county's voters in a presidential election since Lyndon Johnson in 1964.

Like most rural areas throughout northwest Missouri, voters in Atchison County generally adhere to socially and culturally conservative principles which tend to influence their Republican leanings. In 2018, Missourians voted on a proposition (Proposition A) concerning right to work, the outcome of which ultimately reversed the right to work legislation passed in the state the previous year. However, 57.61% of Atchison County voters cast their ballots to keep the law.

=== Missouri presidential preference primaries ===
==== 2020 ====
The 2020 presidential primaries for both the Democratic and Republican parties were held in Missouri on March 10. On the Democratic side, former Vice President Joe Biden (D-Delaware) both won statewide and carried Atchison County by a wide margin. Biden went on to defeat President Donald Trump in the general election.

Missouri Democratic Presidential Primary – Atchison County (2020)
Party	Candidate	Votes	%	±%
Democratic	Joe Biden	211	66.98	
Democratic	Bernie Sanders	86	27.30	
Democratic	Tulsi Gabbard	4	1.27	
Democratic	Others/Uncommitted	14	4.44	

Incumbent President Donald Trump (R-Florida) faced a primary challenge from former Massachusetts Governor Bill Weld, but won both Atchison County and statewide by large margins.

Missouri Republican Presidential Primary – Atchison County (2020)
Party	Candidate	Votes	%	±%
Republican	Donald Trump	454	98.06	
Republican	Bill Weld	5	1.08	
Republican	Others/Uncommitted	4	0.86	

==== 2016 ====
The 2016 presidential primaries for both the Republican and Democratic parties were held in Missouri on March 15. Businessman Donald Trump (R-New York) narrowly won the state overall and carried a plurality of the vote in Atchison County. He went on to win the presidency.

Missouri Republican Presidential Primary – Atchison County (2016)
Party	Candidate	Votes	%	±%
Republican	Donald Trump	487	43.68	
Republican	Ted Cruz	325	29.15	
Republican	Marco Rubio	135	12.11	
Republican	John Kasich	123	11.03	
Republican	Others/Uncommitted	45	4.04	

On the Democratic side, Senator Bernie Sanders (I-Vermont) carried Atchison County, but former Secretary of State Hillary Clinton (D-New York) won statewide by a small margin. Clinton won the nomination that year.

Missouri Democratic Presidential Primary – Atchison County (2016)
Party	Candidate	Votes	%	±%
Democratic	Bernie Sanders	173	54.57	
Democratic	Hillary Clinton	141	44.48	
Democratic	Others/Uncommitted	3	0.95	

==== 2012 ====
The 2012 Missouri Republican Presidential Primary's results were nonbinding on the state's national convention delegates. Voters in Atchison County supported former U.S. Senator Rick Santorum (R-Pennsylvania), who finished first in the state at large, but eventually lost the nomination to former Governor Mitt Romney (R-Massachusetts). Delegates to the congressional district and state conventions were chosen at a county caucus, which selected a delegation favoring Santorum. Incumbent President Barack Obama easily won the Missouri Democratic Primary and renomination. He defeated Romney in the general election.

==== 2008 ====
In 2008, the Missouri Republican Presidential Primary was closely contested, with Senator John McCain (R-Arizona) prevailing and eventually winning the nomination.

Missouri Republican Presidential Primary – Atchison County (2008)
Party	Candidate	Votes	%	±%
Republican	John McCain	281	37.92	
Republican	Mitt Romney	230	31.04	
Republican	Mike Huckabee	189	25.51	
Republican	Ron Paul	25	3.37	
Republican	Others/Uncommitted	16	2.15	

Then-Senator Hillary Clinton (D-New York) received more votes than any candidate from either party in Atchison County during the 2008 presidential primary. Despite initial reports that Clinton had won Missouri, Barack Obama (D-Illinois), also a Senator at the time, narrowly defeated her statewide and later became that year's Democratic nominee, going on to win the presidency.

Missouri Democratic Presidential Primary – Atchison County (2008)
Party	Candidate	Votes	%	±%
Democratic	Hillary Clinton	347	54.73	
Democratic	Barack Obama	262	41.32	
Democratic	Others/Uncommitted	25	3.94	

== See also ==
- National Register of Historic Places listings in Atchison County, Missouri
