= Hamburg, Iowa =

- City
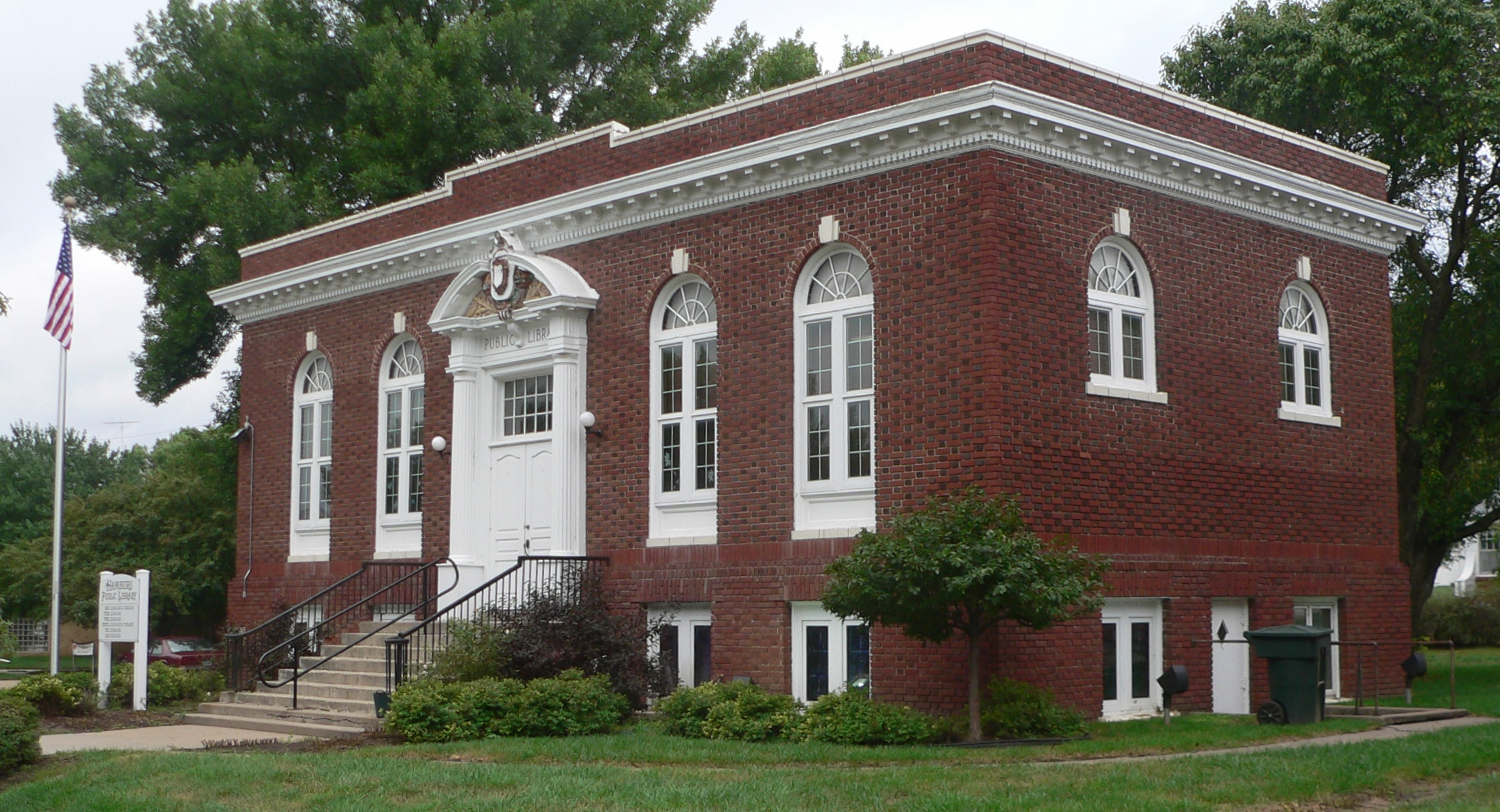
- Hamburg Public Library

- Location of Hamburg, Iowa
- Coordinates: 40°36′22″N 95°39′17″W
- Country: USA
- State: Iowa
- County: Fremont

Area
  - Total: 1.12 sq mi (2.91 km^{2})
  - Land: 1.12 sq mi (2.91 km^{2})
  - Water: 0 sq mi (0.00 km^{2})
- Elevation: 915 ft (279 m)

Population (2020)
  - Total: 890
  - Density: 793.0/sq mi (306.19/km^{2})
- Time zone: UTC-6 (Central (CST))
  - Summer (DST): UTC-5 (CDT)
- ZIP code: 51640
- Area code: 712
- FIPS code: 19-33780
- GNIS feature ID: 467990
- Website: hamburgiowa.org

Hamburg is a city in Fremont County, Iowa, United States, that is the most southwestern city in Iowa, hugging the borders of Missouri to the south and Nebraska to the west. It is situated between the Nishnabotna and Missouri rivers. The population was 890 at the time of the 2020 census. It derives its name from the German city of Hamburg.

== History ==
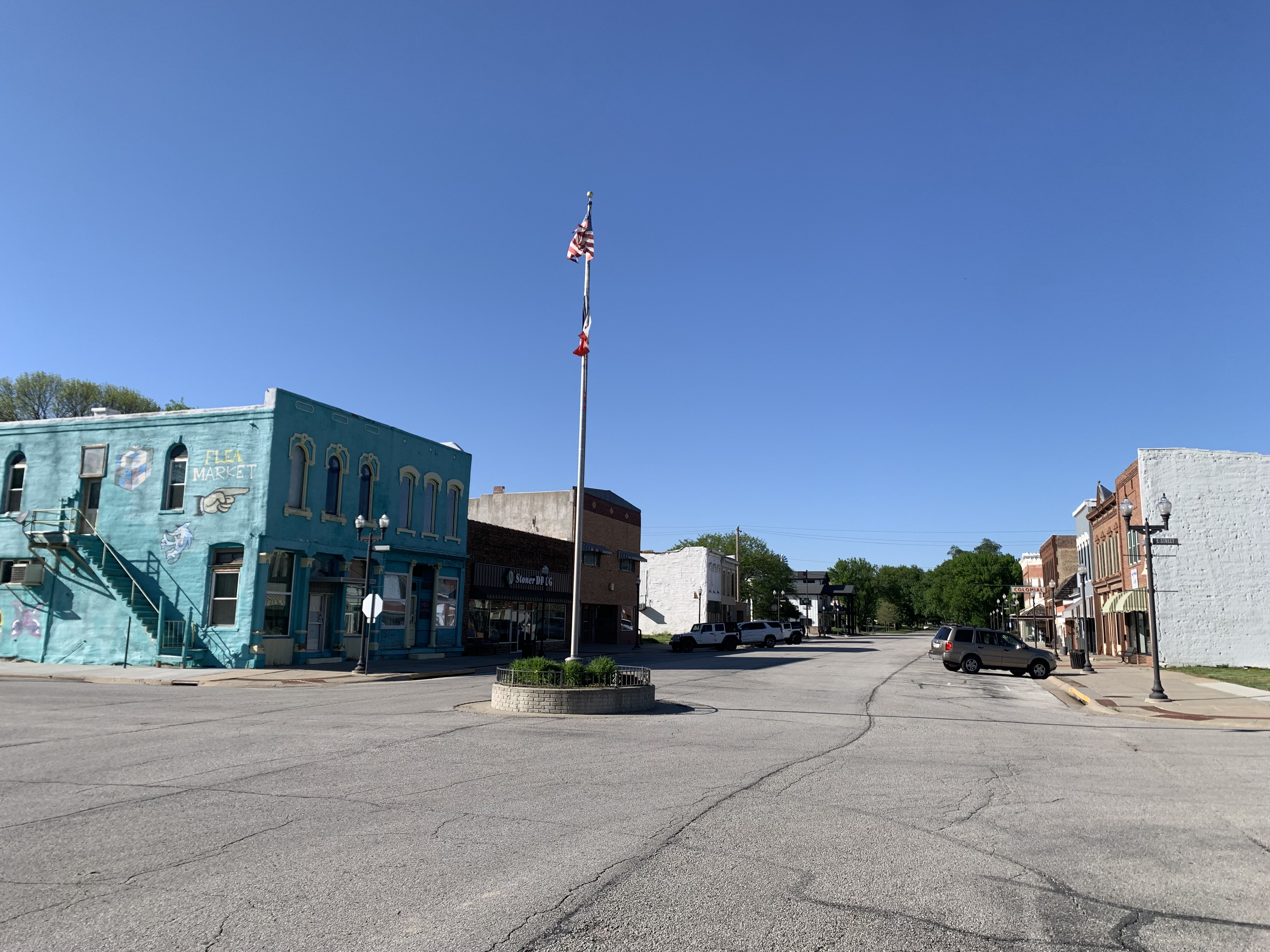
Downtown of Hamburg, IA

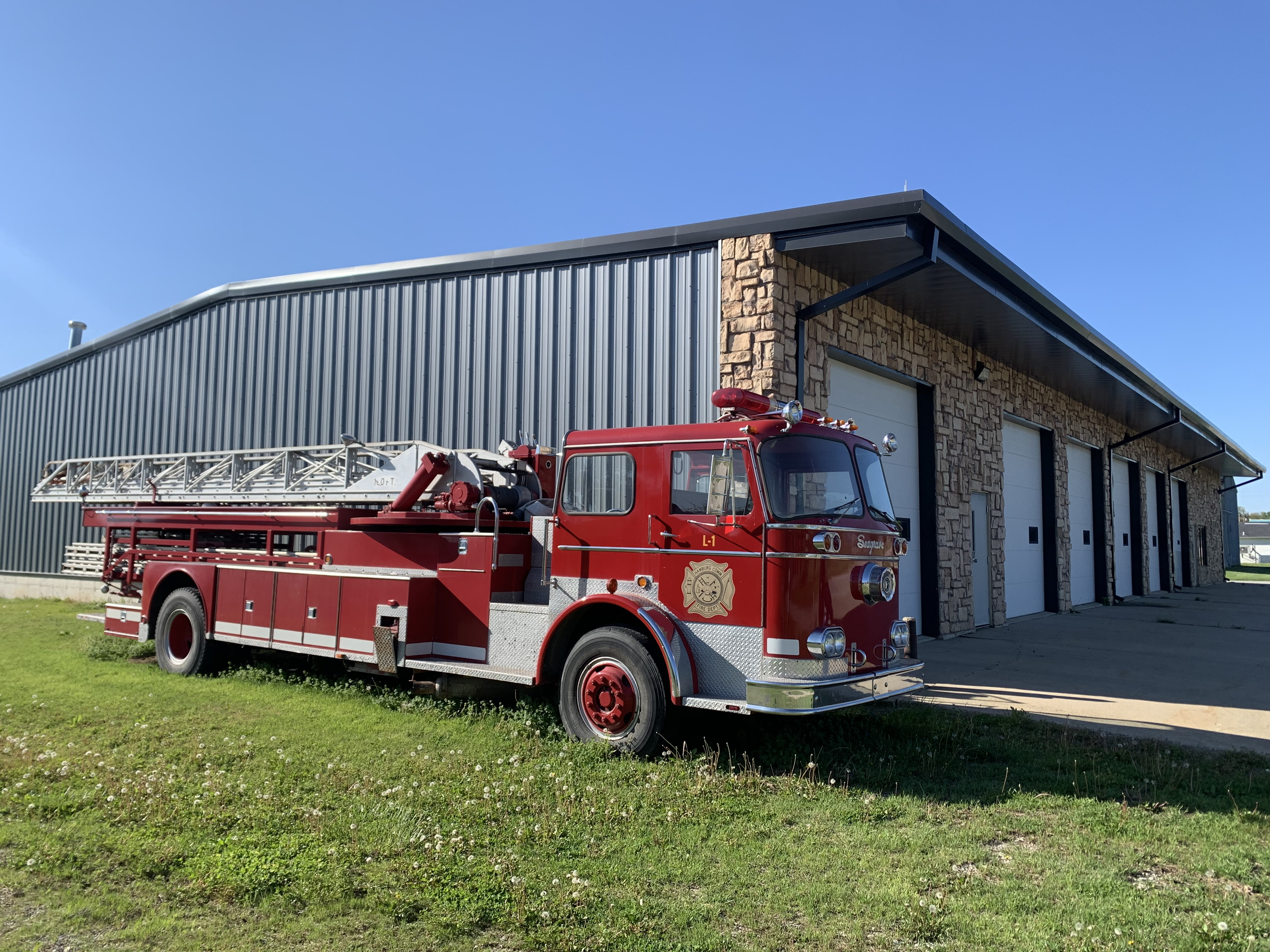
Fire Department of Hamburg, IA

The city is less than a quarter mile from the Missouri state line. The first settlers in the community were people who actually thought they were settling in Missouri following the Platte Purchase of former Indian territory there across the state line opened up settlement. The first formal settlement in the Hamburg vicinity were by the brothers James McKissick, Cornelius McKissick, Daniel McKissick who established McKissick's Grove. A survey was made when Iowa entered the union in 1846, and only then did the settlers discover that they were in Iowa and not Missouri.

The brothers were also involved in another border irregularity when they bought McKissick Island a mile south of Hamburg. They thought at the time the island in the Missouri River was attached to Nebraska territory. The river changed course in 1867 resulting in the island becoming physically attached by dry land to Missouri and cut off from Nebraska by the main channel. Missouri and Nebraska both claimed the island and it was decided in 1904 by the U.S. Supreme Court that it belonged to Nebraska, although the states did not formally agree to the arrangement until 1999. In the meantime students from the Nebraska island passed through Missouri en route to being educated in Hamburg in Iowa.

Hamburg was formally laid out in 1857 at the behest of Augustus Borchers (August Heinrich B., August 26, 1817, Harburg near Hamburg, Germany - November 23, 1885, Hamburg (Ia.)) who named for the German city and was formally incorporated on April 1, 1867 at about the same time as it was reached by the Council Bluffs and St. Joseph Railroad. A second railroad Nebraska City Branch of the Burlington and Missouri River Railroad (which came from Red Oak, Iowa) came through in 1870.

Alex and Arthur Vogel started Vogel and Son Popcorn Company in 1948. The company grew to the point where he bought the city's old water tower and train station to store his popcorn - the two structures hold a million pounds of popcorn. In 1960 the city started its Popcorn Days festival (replacing an earlier named peony festival). Vogel Popcorn is now owned by ConAgra Foods but remains headquartered in the city. Its popcorn is used in Act II and Orville Redenbacher's.

The city gets considerable publicity during periods of Missouri River flooding, including most recently the 2019 Midwestern U.S. floods, which left the city without sewage, water or gas. In 2012, residents sought to raise funds for repairs to the city's flood control levee with a flash mob dance video of "Proud Mary," but did not receive the $5 million needed.

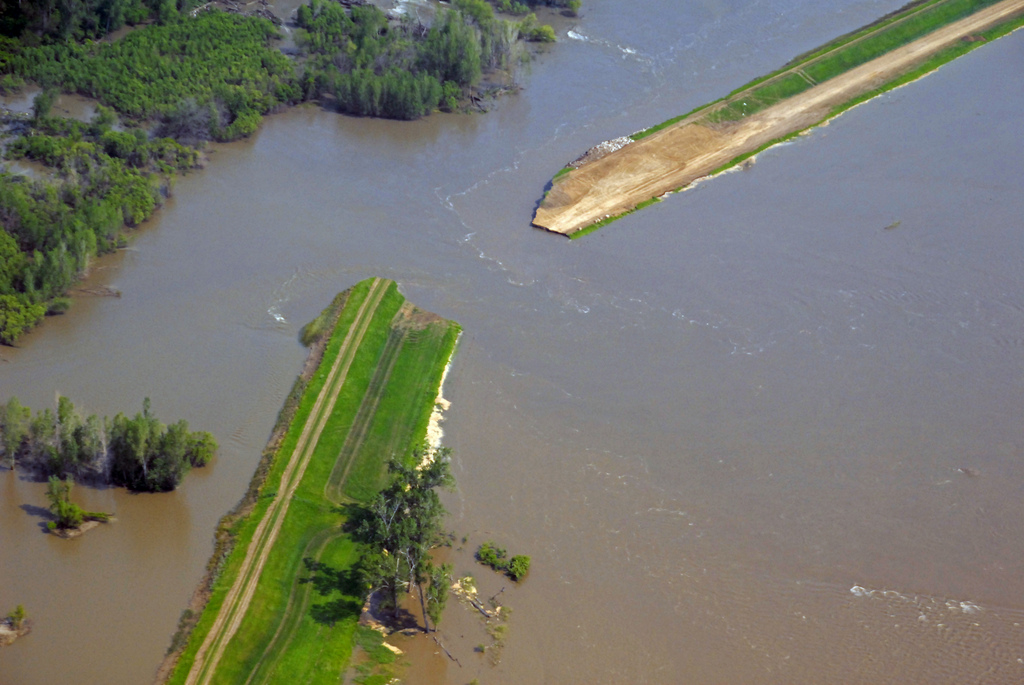
An aerial view of the breach at levee L-575 near Hamburg, which occurred June 13, 2011 and increased to nearly 300 feet in size.

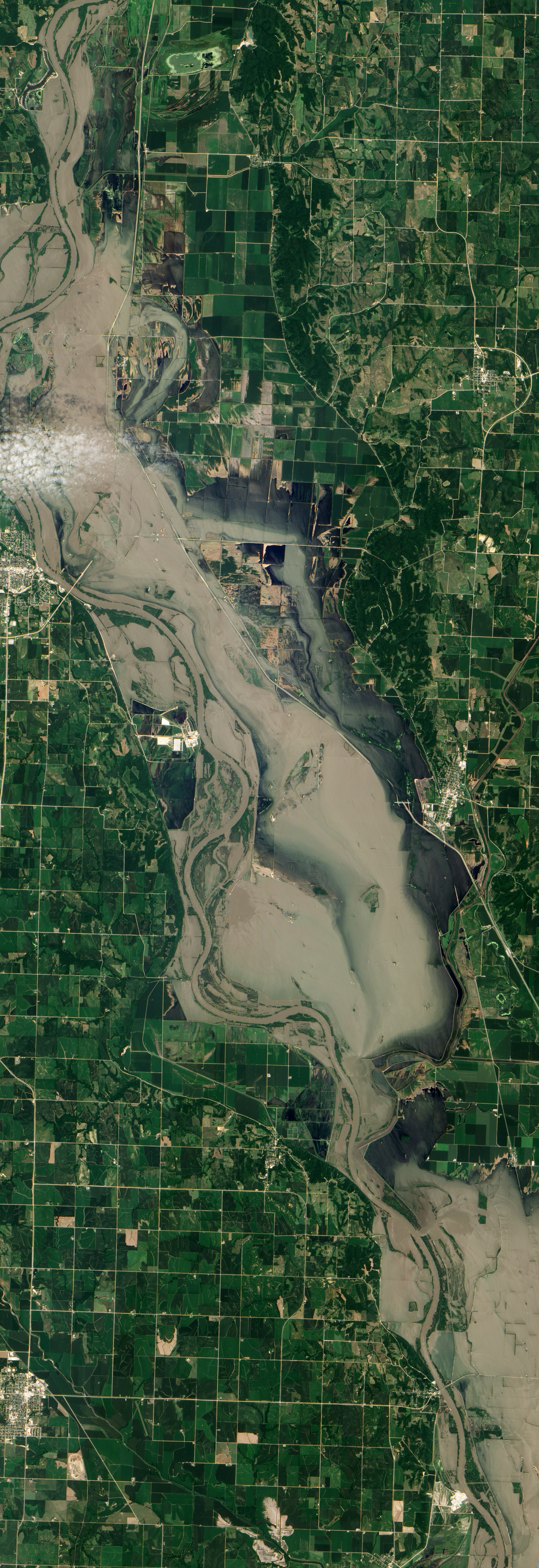
Natural-colour satellite image of muddy flood water near Hamburg after the levee breach.

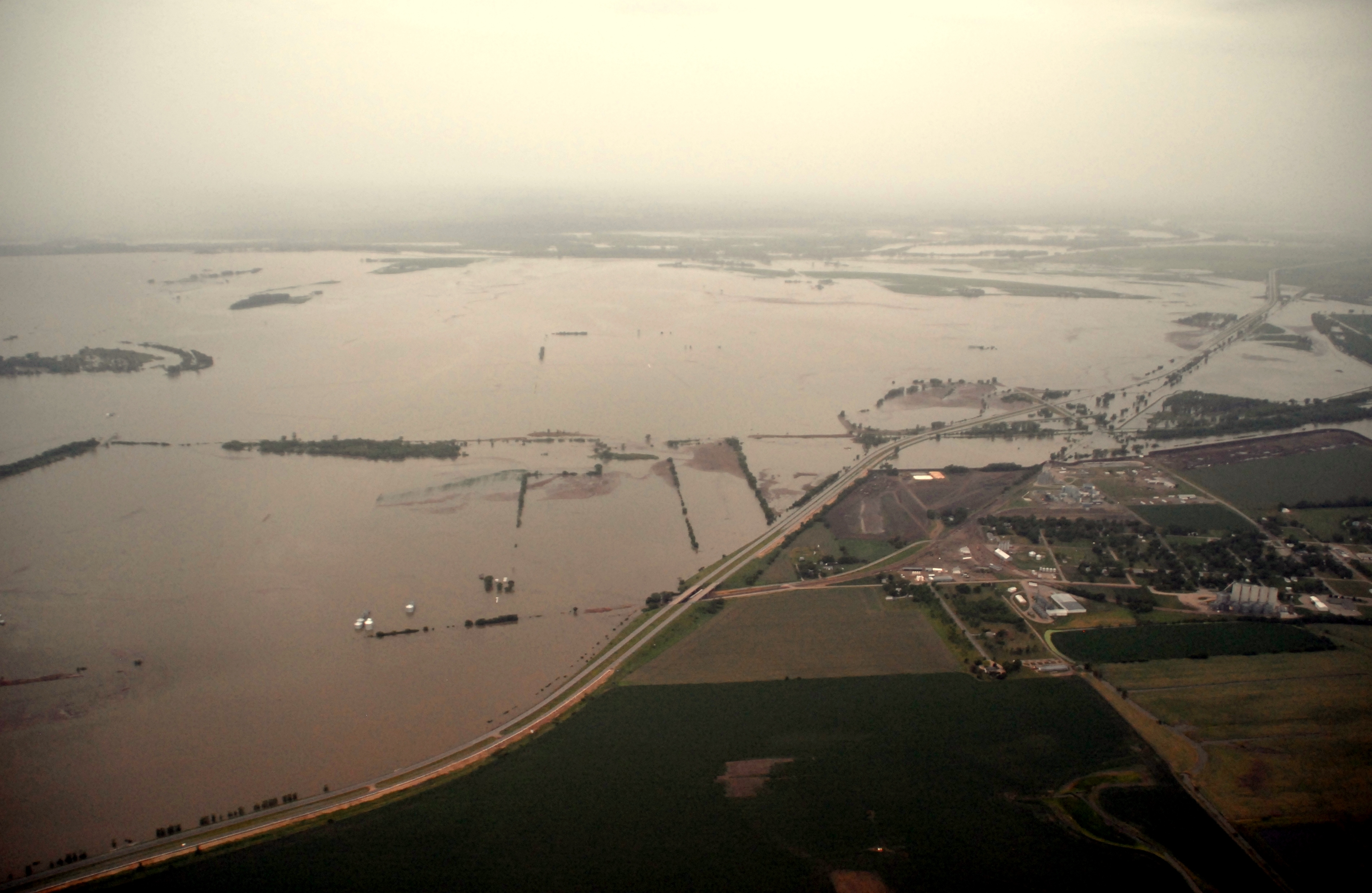
The community on June 16, 2011 during the 2011 Missouri River floods after a levee protecting it was breached. A second levee was built and held.

== Geography ==
According to the United States Census Bureau, the city has a total area of 1.10 square miles (2.85 km^{2}), all land.

=== Climate ===
The hottest temperature ever recorded in Hamburg was 109 °F on July 21, 1974, and the lowest temperature was −25 °F on December 23, 1989. On average, the hottest month is July, and the coldest is January.

Climate data for Hamburg, Iowa
Month	Jan	Feb	Mar	Apr	May	Jun	Jul	Aug	Sep	Oct	Nov	Dec	Year
Record high °F (°C)	69 (21)	82 (28)	91 (33)	96 (36)	100 (38)	105 (41)	109 (43)	103 (39)	102 (39)	94 (34)	83 (28)	72 (22)	109 (43)
Mean daily maximum °F (°C)	33 (1)	39 (4)	51 (11)	63 (17)	73 (23)	82 (28)	86 (30)	84 (29)	78 (26)	66 (19)	50 (10)	36 (2)	62 (17)
Daily mean °F (°C)	24 (−4)	29 (−2)	40 (4)	52 (11)	63 (17)	72 (22)	76 (24)	74 (23)	66 (19)	54 (12)	40 (4)	27 (−3)	51 (11)
Mean daily minimum °F (°C)	14 (−10)	19 (−7)	28 (−2)	40 (4)	52 (11)	62 (17)	66 (19)	64 (18)	54 (12)	42 (6)	30 (−1)	18 (−8)	41 (5)
Record low °F (°C)	−22 (−30)	−23 (−31)	−17 (−27)	8 (−13)	28 (−2)	41 (5)	44 (7)	42 (6)	28 (−2)	14 (−10)	−9 (−23)	−25 (−32)	−25 (−32)
Average precipitation inches (mm)	0.82 (21)	0.95 (24)	2.44 (62)	3.36 (85)	4.51 (115)	4.22 (107)	5.08 (129)	3.85 (98)	3.61 (92)	2.63 (67)	2.09 (53)	1.10 (28)	34.66 (881)
Average snowfall inches (cm)	6.5 (17)	6.1 (15)	5.9 (15)	1.7 (4.3)	0 (0)	0 (0)	0 (0)	0 (0)	0 (0)	0.5 (1.3)	3.1 (7.9)	7.1 (18)	30.9 (78.5)
Source 1:
Source 2:

== Demographics ==
Historical populations
Year	Pop.	±%
1860	167	—
1870	1,431	+756.9%
1880	2,036	+42.3%
1890	1,634	−19.7%
1900	2,079	+27.2%
1910	1,817	−12.6%
1920	2,017	+11.0%
1930	2,103	+4.3%
1940	2,187	+4.0%
1950	2,086	−4.6%
1960	1,647	−21.0%
1970	1,649	+0.1%
1980	1,597	−3.2%
1990	1,248	−21.9%
2000	1,240	−0.6%
2010	1,187	−4.3%
2020	890	−25.0%
Source:"U.S. Census website". United States Census Bureau. and Iowa Data Center; Source: U.S. Decennial Census

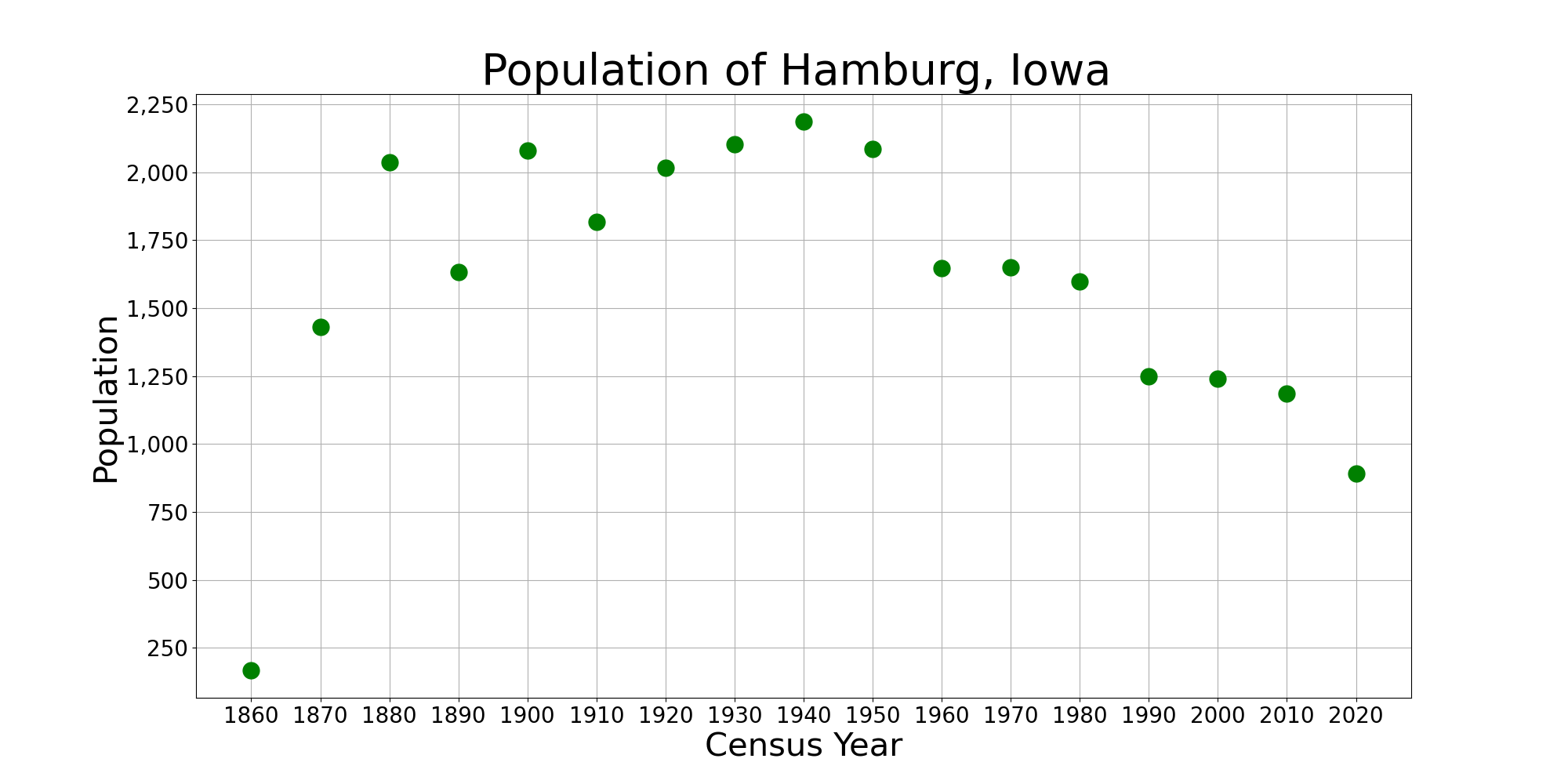
The population of Hamburg, Iowa from US census data

=== 2020 census ===
As of the census of 2020, there were 890 people, 365 households, and 245 families residing in the city. The population density was 793.0 inhabitants per square mile (306.2/km^{2}). There were 458 housing units at an average density of 408.1 per square mile (157.6/km^{2}). The racial makeup of the city was 93.6% White, 0.2% Black or African American, 0.3% Native American, 0.2% Asian, 0.1% Pacific Islander, 1.6% from other races and 3.9% from two or more races. Hispanic or Latino persons of any race comprised 3.4% of the population.

Of the 365 households, 23.3% of which had children under the age of 18 living with them, 51.5% were married couples living together, 4.1% were cohabitating couples, 21.9% had a female householder with no spouse or partner present and 22.5% had a male householder with no spouse or partner present. 32.9% of all households were non-families. 28.8% of all households were made up of individuals, 11.0% had someone living alone who was 65 years old or older.

The median age in the city was 45.5 years. 23.3% of the residents were under the age of 20; 5.4% were between the ages of 20 and 24; 20.3% were from 25 and 44; 28.1% were from 45 and 64; and 22.9% were 65 years of age or older. The gender makeup of the city was 50.9% male and 49.1% female.

=== 2010 census ===
As of the census of 2010, there were 1,187 people, 514 households, and 312 families residing in the city. The population density was 1,079.1 inhabitants per square mile (416.6/km^{2}). There were 594 housing units at an average density of 540.0 per square mile (208.5/km^{2}). The racial makeup of the city was 94.2% White, 0.8% African American, 0.5% Native American, 0.3% Asian, 0.1% Pacific Islander, 2.7% from other races, and 1.4% from two or more races. Hispanic or Latino of any race were 6.2% of the population.

There were 514 households, of which 28.2% had children under the age of 18 living with them, 42.8% were married couples living together, 12.8% had a female householder with no husband present, 5.1% had a male householder with no wife present, and 39.3% were non-families. 33.3% of all households were made up of individuals, and 16.5% had someone living alone who was 65 years of age or older. The average household size was 2.31 and the average family size was 2.88.

The median age in the city was 41 years. 23.5% of residents were under the age of 18; 9.8% were between the ages of 18 and 24; 20.5% were from 25 to 44; 26.3% were from 45 to 64; and 19.9% were 65 years of age or older. The gender makeup of the city was 50.1% male and 49.9% female.

=== 2000 census ===
As of the census of 2000, there were 1,240 people, 544 households, and 343 families residing in the city. The population density was 1,107.1 inhabitants per square mile (427.5/km^{2}). There were 604 housing units at an average density of 539.3 per square mile (208.2/km^{2}). The racial makeup of the city was 96.21% White, 0.08% African American, 0.24% Native American, 0.32% Asian, 2.66% from other races, and 0.48% from two or more races. Hispanic or Latino of any race were 5.48% of the population.

There were 544 households, out of which 27.6% had children under the age of 18 living with them, 46.1% were married couples living together, 12.5% had a female householder with no husband present, and 36.8% were non-families. 32.4% of all households were made up of individuals, and 18.4% had someone living alone who was 65 years of age or older. The average household size was 2.27 and the average family size was 2.83.

In the city, the population was spread out, with 22.9% under the age of 18, 6.9% from 18 to 24, 24.7% from 25 to 44, 24.3% from 45 to 64, and 21.2% who were 65 years of age or older. The median age was 42 years. For every 100 females, there were 88.7 males. For every 100 females age 18 and over, there were 87.5 males.

The median income for a household in the city was $29,479, and the median income for a family was $42,935. Males had a median income of $28,162 versus $20,781 for females. The per capita income for the city was $16,050. About 11.7% of families and 13.9% of the population were below the poverty line, including 21.3% of those under age 18 and 11.0% of those age 65 or over.

== Economy ==
Hamburg is the corporate headquarters of Vogel Popcorn, which claims to be the source of 52 percent of the popcorn grown in the United States.

== Education ==
Hamburg Community School District operates a PreK-8 public school; the district pays other school districts to educate high school students. A charter high school opened in 2022

From 2011 until 2016 Hamburg was in a grade-sharing relationship with the Farragut Community School District; prior to 2015 Hamburg students had to go to Farragut for senior high school, while after 2015 all secondary school students (middle and high school) went to Farragut. Nishnabotna High School in Farragut became the community high school for both Farragut and Hamburg. The Farragut closed in 2016, and the Hamburg district became a K-8 district that sent its high school students to other districts.

== Notable people ==
- Betty Bennett, singer.
- Julie Kushner, Connecticut state senator, lived in Hamburg before moving to Lincoln, Nebraska.
- Willard W. Millikan, World War II Flying Ace
- William Benjamin Polk, Illinois state representative, was born in Hamburg.
- Dani Reeves, editor-in-chief, Deluxe Version magazine, owner of Models Access

== See also ==
- List of cities in Iowa
