= Riverton Township, Fremont County, Iowa =

Riverton Township
- Township
- Location in Fremont County
- Coordinates: 40°41′32″N 95°32′41″W
- Country: United States
- State: Iowa
- County: Fremont

Area
  - Total: 29.95 sq mi (77.57 km^{2})
  - Land: 28.67 sq mi (74.25 km^{2})
  - Water: 1.28 sq mi (3.32 km^{2}) 4.28%
- Elevation: 928 ft (283 m)

Population (2010)
  - Total: 380
  - Density: 13/sq mi (5.1/km^{2})
- Time zone: UTC-6 (CST)
  - Summer (DST): UTC-5 (CDT)
- ZIP codes: 51639, 51640, 51650, 51652
- GNIS feature ID: 0468625

Riverton Township is one of thirteen townships in Fremont County, Iowa, United States. As of the 2010 census, its population was 380 and it contained 181 housing units.

== Geography ==
As of the 2010 census, Riverton Township covered an area of 29.95 square miles (77.6 km^{2}); of this, 28.67 square miles (74.3 km^{2}) (95.72 percent) was land and 1.28 square miles (3.3 km^{2}) (4.28 percent) was water.

=== Cities, towns, villages ===
- Farragut (west edge)
- Riverton

=== Cemeteries ===
The township contains Riverton Cemetery.

== School districts ==
- Farragut Community School District
- Hamburg Community School District
- Sidney Community School District

== Political districts ==
- Iowa's 3rd congressional district
- State House District 23
- State Senate District 12
