= Riverside Township, Fremont County, Iowa =

Riverside Township
- Township
- Location in Fremont County
- Coordinates: 40°51′30″N 95°33′24″W
- Country: United States
- State: Iowa
- County: Fremont

Area
  - Total: 35.96 sq mi (93.13 km^{2})
  - Land: 35.65 sq mi (92.33 km^{2})
  - Water: 0.31 sq mi (0.8 km^{2}) 0.86%
- Elevation: 988 ft (301 m)

Population (2010)
  - Total: 313
  - Density: 8.8/sq mi (3.4/km^{2})
- Time zone: UTC-6 (CST)
  - Summer (DST): UTC-5 (CDT)
- ZIP codes: 51639, 51649, 51652, 51653
- GNIS feature ID: 0468621

Riverside Township is one of thirteen townships in Fremont County, Iowa, United States. As of the 2010 census, its population was 313 and it contained 150 housing units.

== Geography ==
As of the 2010 census, Riverside Township covered an area of 35.96 square miles (93.1 km^{2}); of this, 35.65 square miles (92.3 km^{2}) (99.14 percent) was land and 0.31 square miles (0.80 km^{2}) (0.86 percent) was water.

=== Cities, towns, villages ===
- Randolph

=== Cemeteries ===
The township contains Duff Cemetery, Randolph Cemetery and Riverside Cemetery.

== School districts ==
- Farragut Community School District
- Fremont–Mills Community School District
- Sidney Community School District

== Political districts ==
- Iowa's 3rd congressional district
- State House District 23
- State Senate District 12
