= Scott Township, Fremont County, Iowa =

Scott Township
- Township
- Location in Fremont County
- Coordinates: 40°50′35″N 95°46′34″W
- Country: United States
- State: Iowa
- County: Fremont

Area
  - Total: 41.52 sq mi (107.53 km^{2})
  - Land: 40.20 sq mi (104.13 km^{2})
  - Water: 1.32 sq mi (3.41 km^{2}) 3.17%
- Elevation: 938 ft (286 m)

Population (2010)
  - Total: 486
  - Density: 12/sq mi (4.7/km^{2})
- Time zone: UTC-6 (CST)
  - Summer (DST): UTC-5 (CDT)
- ZIP codes: 51653, 51654
- GNIS feature ID: 0468669

Scott Township is one of thirteen townships in Fremont County, Iowa, United States. As of the 2010 census, its population was 486 and it contained 217 housing units.

== Geography ==
As of the 2010 census, Scott Township covered an area of 41.52 square miles (107.5 km^{2}); of this, 40.2 square miles (104 km^{2}) (96.83 percent) was land and 1.32 square miles (3.4 km^{2}) (3.17 percent) was water.

=== Cities, towns, villages ===
- Bartlett
- Thurman

=== Cemeteries ===
The township contains Ewell Cemetery, Mackey Cemetery, Thurman Cemetery and Thurman Cemetery.

=== Transportation ===
- Interstate 29

=== Lakes ===
- Forney Lake

== School districts ==
- Fremont–Mills Community School District
- Sidney Community School District

== Political districts ==
- Iowa's 3rd congressional district
- State House District 23
- State Senate District 12
