= Monroe Township, Fremont County, Iowa =

Monroe Township
- Township
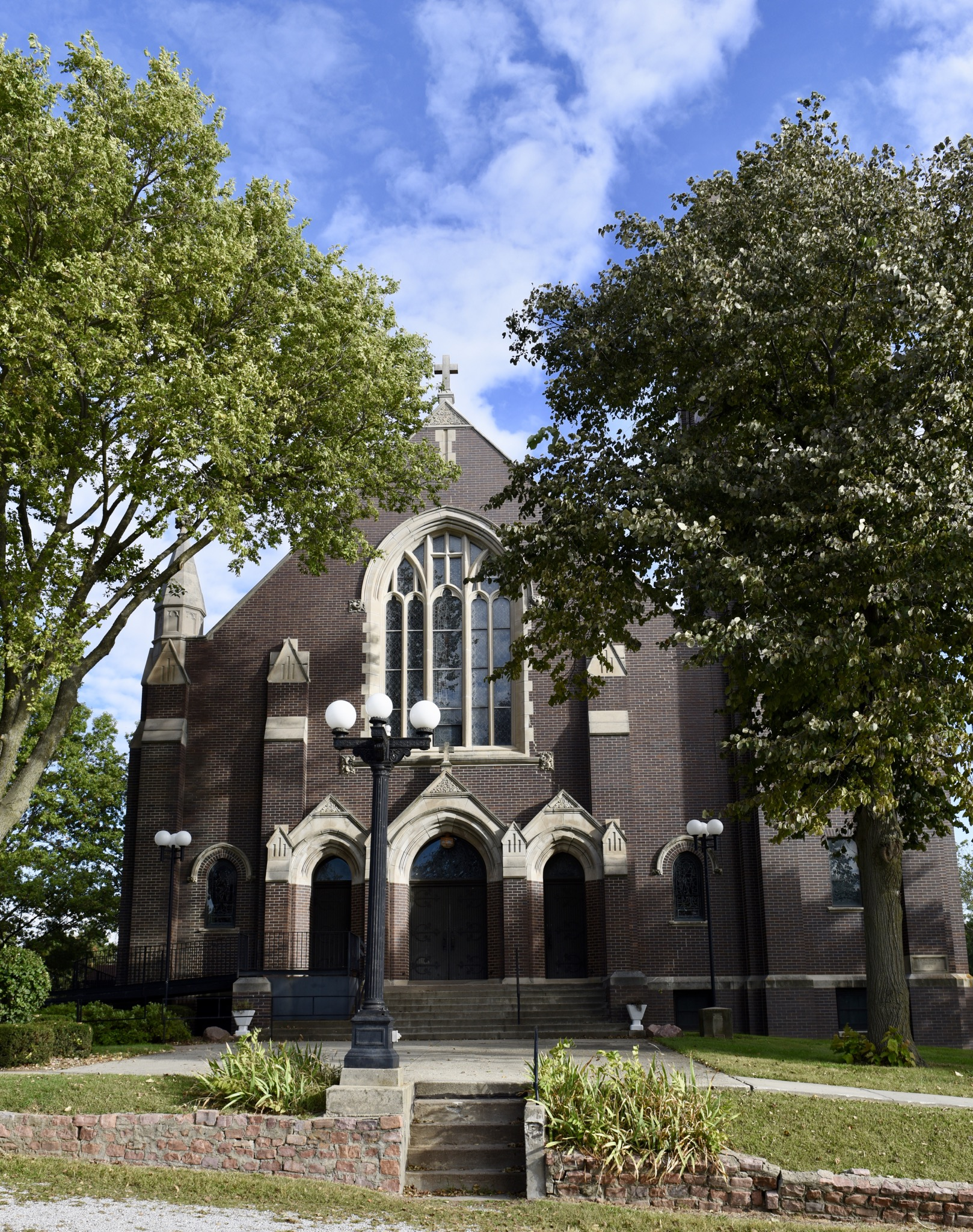
- St. Patrick Church in Imogene

- Location in Fremont County
- Coordinates: 40°51′29″N 95°26′31″W
- Country: United States
- State: Iowa
- County: Fremont

Area
  - Total: 35.92 sq mi (93.03 km^{2})
  - Land: 35.92 sq mi (93.03 km^{2})
  - Water: 0 sq mi (0 km^{2}) 0%
- Elevation: 1,112 ft (339 m)

Population (2010)
  - Total: 230
  - Density: 6.5/sq mi (2.5/km^{2})
- Time zone: UTC-6 (CST)
  - Summer (DST): UTC-5 (CDT)
- ZIP codes: 51639, 51645, 51649
- GNIS feature ID: 0468393

Monroe Township is one of thirteen townships in Fremont County, Iowa, United States. As of the 2010 census, its population was 230 and it contained 99 housing units.

== History ==
Monroe Township was organized in 1855.

== Geography ==
As of the 2010 census, Monroe Township covered an area of 35.92 square miles (93.0 km^{2}), all land.

=== Cities, towns, villages ===
- Imogene

=== Cemeteries ===
The township contains Monroe Cemetery and Mount Calvary Cemetery.

=== Transportation ===
- U.S. Route 59

== School districts ==
- Farragut Community School District
- Fremont–Mills Community School District
- Shenandoah Community School District

== Political districts ==
- Iowa's 3rd congressional district
- State House District 23
- State Senate District 12
