= Benton Township, Fremont County, Iowa =

Benton Township
- Township
- Location in Fremont County
- Coordinates: 40°44′09″N 95°49′00″W
- Country: United States
- State: Iowa
- County: Fremont

Area
  - Total: 45.71 sq mi (118.39 km^{2})
  - Land: 44 sq mi (115 km^{2})
  - Water: 1.31 sq mi (3.39 km^{2}) 2.87%
- Elevation: 925 ft (282 m)

Population (2010)
  - Total: 254
  - Density: 5.7/sq mi (2.2/km^{2})
- Time zone: UTC-6 (CST)
  - Summer (DST): UTC-5 (CDT)
- ZIP codes: 51648, 51654
- GNIS feature ID: 0467443

Benton Township is one of thirteen townships in Fremont County, Iowa, United States. As of the 2010 census, its population was 254 and it contained 122 housing units.

== Geography ==
As of the 2010 census, Benton Township covered an area of 45.71 square miles (118.4 km^{2}); of this, 44.4 square miles (115 km^{2}) (97.13 percent) was land and 1.31 square miles (3.4 km^{2}) (2.87 percent) was water.

=== Cities, towns, villages ===
- Percival

=== Unincorporated towns ===
- Eureka at 40°45′56″N 95°50′16″W

(This list is based on USGS data and may include former settlements.)

=== Extinct towns ===
- East Port at 40°40′44″N 95°50′08″W

(These towns are listed as "historical" by the USGS.)

=== Cemeteries ===
The township contains Blanchard Cemetery and Lambert Cemetery.

=== Transportation ===
- Interstate 29
- Iowa Highway 2

=== Lakes ===
- Liebold Lake
- St Lake

== School districts ==
- Fremont–Mills Community School District
- Hamburg Community School District
- Sidney Community School District

== Political districts ==
- Iowa's 3rd congressional district
- State House District 23
- State Senate District 12
