= Madison Township, Fremont County, Iowa =

Madison Township
- Township
- Location in Fremont County
- Coordinates: 40°37′09″N 95°33′40″W
- Country: United States
- State: Iowa
- County: Fremont

Area
  - Total: 39.67 sq mi (102.74 km^{2})
  - Land: 39.41 sq mi (102.07 km^{2})
  - Water: 0.26 sq mi (0.67 km^{2}) 0.65%
- Elevation: 1,004 ft (306 m)

Population (2010)
  - Total: 141
  - Density: 3.6/sq mi (1.4/km^{2})
- Time zone: UTC-6 (CST)
  - Summer (DST): UTC-5 (CDT)
- ZIP codes: 51640, 51650
- GNIS feature ID: 0468320

Madison Township is one of thirteen townships in Fremont County, Iowa, United States. As of the 2010 census, its population was 141 and it contained 68 housing units.

== Geography ==
As of the 2010 census, Madison Township covered an area of 39.67 square miles (102.7 km^{2}); of this, 39.41 square miles (102.1 km^{2}) (99.35 percent) was land and 0.26 square miles (0.67 km^{2}) (0.65 percent) was water.

=== Cemeteries ===
The township contains Beehive Cemetery, Columbia and French Cemetery, Mount Olive Cemetery, Stauch Cemetery, Utterback Cemetery and Wesleyan Cemetery.

=== Transportation ===
- Iowa Highway 333
- U.S. Route 275

== School districts ==
- Farragut Community School District
- Hamburg Community School District

== Political districts ==
- Iowa's 3rd congressional district
- State House District 23
- State Senate District 12
