= Civil Bend, Iowa =

Extinct hamlet in Iowa, U.S.

Coordinates: 40°48′12″N 95°50′08″W

Civil Bend, Iowa was a village established in 1850 located in the western part of Benton Township in Fremont County, near the present-day town of Percival on the Missouri River in the U.S. state of Iowa. It was a noted station on the Underground Railroad, and a stop along the Lane Trail.

== History ==
The first settler in the area was a ferryman named John Boulware. Another was a man surnamed Hickson. Hickson sold whiskey to the natives and settlers and the wild times that ensued were the origin of the place's name, Devil's Bend. The bend upriver from this was settled by abolitionist graduates of Oberlin College and the contrast between their lifestyle and that of Hickson's customers led to their settlement being called Civil Bend. They came, determined to establish a safe haven for freedom seekers from the neighboring slave-friendly states of Missouri to the south, Nebraska to the west, Kansas to the southwest, and the rest of the southern United States. Lester Platt and his wife Elvira were among the first settlers, arriving in 1847, and Lester began helping trafficked Black people escape their enslavers. Ira Blanchard and George Gaston also settled nearby and shared Platt's sentiment and commitments about freedom seekers. Formerly enslaved people, such as Henry and Maria Garner and their family also settled in Civil Bend. By 1850, the settlement had a Congregational Church when John Todd arrived to serve as minister. Sitting in the Missouri River bottoms, the village's proximity to the river became an issue because of repeated flooding.

In the mid-1850s white settlers established a new town on the tablelands to the east of Civil Bend called Tabor. A good number remained in Civil Bend and it became an Abolitionist haven and the western terminus of the Underground Railroad that ran east across Iowa until the end of the United States Civil War in 1865. By 1857, it was indirectly referred to as such in a Michigan newspaper. Another account mentioned 75 slave-catchers hunting the 35 armed men protecting and escorting freedom seekers fleeing their enslaver, Stephen F. Nuckolls, as they moved from Civil Bend to Tabor. By January 1859 it was open knowledge that Civil Bend was part of the Underground Railroad. At the end of that year, Nuckolls sued residents of Civil Bend for stealing the two freedom seekers from him. The following year, one of the men whose home he illegally ransacked in a vain search for the seekers was awarded $8000 (the equivalent of nearly $300,000 in 2024) in punitive damages from Nuckolls. A few months after this, in October, two free Black residents of Civil Bend and their free relative were kidnapped and carried off to the South. The relative, from Council Bluffs, escaped to tell the story, but he had no idea what happened to them.

The African Americans who lived in the town stayed there though, along with a few white people.

With the coming of the Civil War men from Civil Bend formed a company, first under Colonel Craynor, then under Captain William H. Folmsbee. The community continued to grow after the war and collection was taken for a Methodist Episcopal church in 1868.

=== Notable residents ===
- Elmer Ellsworth Beach (1861—1950), American football player and lawyer
- Elvira Gaston Platt, teacher and abolitionist
- Ira Blanchard, Underground Railroad conductor

== Present ==
Today, the site of Civil Bend is owned by the United States Army Corps of Engineers and is open to the public for outdoor activities.
