= Locust Grove Township, Fremont County, Iowa =

Locust Grove Township
- Township
- Location in Fremont County
- Coordinates: 40°37′07″N 95°25′52″W
- Country: United States
- State: Iowa
- County: Fremont

Area
  - Total: 31.15 sq mi (80.67 km^{2})
  - Land: 31.15 sq mi (80.67 km^{2})
  - Water: 0 sq mi (0 km^{2}) 0%
- Elevation: 1,155 ft (352 m)

Population (2010)
  - Total: 164
  - Density: 5.2/sq mi (2/km^{2})
- Time zone: UTC-6 (CST)
  - Summer (DST): UTC-5 (CDT)
- ZIP codes: 51601, 51639, 51640, 51650
- GNIS feature ID: 0468292

Locust Grove Township is one of thirteen townships in Fremont County, Iowa, United States. At the 2010 census, its population was 164 and it contained 77 housing units.

== Geography ==
According to the 2010 census, Locust Grove Township covers an area of 31.15 square miles (80.7 km^{2}), all land.

=== Cemeteries ===
The township contains Locust Grove Cemetery and Saint Pauls Lutheran Cemetery.

=== Transportation ===
- Iowa Highway 333
- U.S. Route 59

== School districts ==
- Farragut Community School District
- Hamburg Community School District

== Political districts ==
- Iowa's 3rd congressional district
- State House District 23
- State Senate District 12
