= Prairie Township, Fremont County, Iowa =

Prairie Township
- Township
- Location in Fremont County
- Coordinates: 40°46′18″N 95°32′49″W
- Country: United States
- State: Iowa
- County: Fremont

Area
  - Total: 29.75 sq mi (77.06 km^{2})
  - Land: 29.54 sq mi (76.51 km^{2})
  - Water: 0.21 sq mi (0.55 km^{2}) 0.72%
- Elevation: 1,086 ft (331 m)

Population (2010)
  - Total: 115
  - Density: 3.9/sq mi (1.5/km^{2})
- Time zone: UTC-6 (CST)
  - Summer (DST): UTC-5 (CDT)
- ZIP codes: 51639, 51649, 51652
- GNIS feature ID: 0468570

Prairie Township is one of thirteen townships in Fremont County, Iowa, United States. As of the 2010 census, its population was 115 and it contained 58 housing units.

== Geography ==
As of the 2010 census, Prairie Township covered an area of 29.75 square miles (77.1 km^{2}); of this, 29.54 square miles (76.5 km^{2}) (99.28 percent) was land and 0.21 square miles (0.54 km^{2}) (0.72 percent) was water.

=== Cemeteries ===
The township contains Chamber Cemetery and Wagner Cemetery.

=== Transportation ===
- Iowa Highway 2

== School districts ==
- Farragut Community School District
- Sidney Community School District

== Political districts ==
- Iowa's 3rd congressional district
- State House District 23
- State Senate District 12
