= Walnut Township, Fremont County, Iowa =

Walnut Township
- Township
- Location in Fremont County
- Coordinates: 40°46′59″N 95°26′56″W
- Country: United States
- State: Iowa
- County: Fremont

Area
  - Total: 25.20 sq mi (65.26 km^{2})
  - Land: 25.20 sq mi (65.26 km^{2})
  - Water: 0 sq mi (0 km^{2}) 0%
- Elevation: 1,109 ft (338 m)

Population (2010)
  - Total: 145
  - Density: 5.7/sq mi (2.2/km^{2})
- Time zone: UTC-6 (CST)
  - Summer (DST): UTC-5 (CDT)
- ZIP codes: 51601, 51639
- GNIS feature ID: 0468884

Walnut Township is one of thirteen townships in Fremont County, Iowa, United States. As of the 2010 census, its population was 145 and it contained 66 housing units.

== Geography ==
As of the 2010 census, Walnut Township covered an area of 25.2 square miles (65 km^{2}), all land.

=== Transportation ===
- Iowa Highway 2

== School districts ==
- Farragut Community School District
- Shenandoah Community School District

== Political districts ==
- Iowa's 3rd congressional district
- State House District 23
- State Senate District 12
