= East Nishnabotna River =

Stream in Iowa, U.S.

Location
- Country: United States
- State: Iowa
- County: Audubon, Carroll, Cass, Fremont, Montgomery, Page, and Pottawattamie

Physical characteristics
- Source
  - location: Ewoldt Township
  - coordinates: 41°54′03″N 94°59′31″W
  - elevation: 1,510 ft (460 m)
- Mouth: Nishnabotna River
  - location: Madison Township
  - coordinates: 40°39′08″N 95°37′24″W
  - elevation: 909 ft (277 m)
- Length: 123.6 mi (198.9 km)
- Width
  - average: 75 ft (23 m)
- Discharge
  - location: SW of Atlantic
  - average: 193 cu ft/s (5.5 m^{3}/s)
  - minimum: 23.8 cu ft/s (0.67 m^{3}/s)
  - maximum: 3,760 cu ft/s (106 m^{3}/s)
- Discharge
  - location: Red Oak
  - average: 337.5 cu ft/s (9.56 m^{3}/s)
  - minimum: 30 cu ft/s (0.85 m^{3}/s)
  - maximum: 13,700 cu ft/s (390 m^{3}/s)

Basin features
- Progression: East Nishnabotna River → Nishnabotna River → Missouri River → Mississippi River → Atlantic Ocean

The East Nishnabotna River is a stream in the U.S. state of Iowa. It is a tributary of Nishnabotna River and is 123.6 miles. and is considered a major water source by the Iowa DNR.

Three notable towns are situated on the East Nishnabotna River: Atlantic, Red Oak, and Shenandoah. Shenandoah was said to have been named because of the resemblance of the East Nishnabotna river valley to the Shenandoah Valley in Virginia.

== Hydrology ==
The stream is monitored at two places by USGS, Red Oak and Atlantic. The river's average discharge is 506 cubic feet per second at Red Oak. There was a stream gauge at Riverton from 2010 to 2016.

== Course ==
The East Nishnabotna rises in southwestern Carroll County and flows southerly to Hamlin in Audubon County and begins to travel beside US Highway 71. Five miles further south, the stream passes to the west of Exira, then turns southwest and passes Brayton and Lorah as it enters Cass County. It then continues past Atlantic, the largest town on its course, and is joined by Troublesome Creek and Turkey Creek thereabouts.

The stream parts from US 71 and continues southerly past Lewis and enters Pottawattamie County as it passes Griswold. The stream continues southerly and enters Montgomery County as it passes Elliott. Continuing another 10 miles south-southwest, it passes Red Oak, then 7 miles later, Coburg. As it enters Page County, it turns back more southwest and passes Essex, Shenandoah, and Riverton in Fremont County before joining with the West Nishnabotna River to begin the Nishnabotna River.

== Tributaries ==
=== Fremont County ===
- Mill Creek - 17 miles long
- Ledgewood Creek
- Fisher Creek

=== Page County ===
- Fourmile Creek
- Rocky Creek
  - Eightmile Branch

=== Montgomery County ===
- Ramp Creek
  - Ashby Creek
- Mormon Branch
- Red Oak Creek
- Coe Creek

=== Pottawattamie County ===
- Clarks Branch
- Baughmans Creek

=== Cass County ===
  - Lone Tree Branch
- Indian Creek - 38 miles long
  - Camp Creek
  - Prairie Rose Creek
  - Elkhorn Creek
    - Little Indian Creek
  - Wolf Creek
    - Bonnie Creek
  - Bull Run
- Spring Creek
- Turkey Creek - 32 miles long
  - Bear Branch
  - Lone Tree Branch
  - Jim Branch
  - Eller Branch
- Buck Creek - 16 miles long
- Troublesome Creek - 34 miles long
  - Crooked Creek
  - Pleasant Creek
  - Fourmile Creek

=== Audubon County ===
- Sifford Creek
- Davids Creek - 17 miles long
  - Honey Creek
- Bluegrass Creek
- Crabapple Creek

== See also ==
- List of rivers of Iowa
- List of tributaries of the Missouri River
