= Fisher Township, Fremont County, Iowa =

Fisher Township
- Township
- Location in Fremont County
- Coordinates: 40°42′22″N 95°25′43″W
- Country: United States
- State: Iowa
- County: Fremont

Area
  - Total: 40.46 sq mi (104.78 km^{2})
  - Land: 40.46 sq mi (104.78 km^{2})
  - Water: 0 sq mi (0 km^{2}) 0%
- Elevation: 1,076 ft (328 m)

Population (2010)
  - Total: 698
  - Density: 17/sq mi (6.7/km^{2})
- Time zone: UTC-6 (CST)
  - Summer (DST): UTC-5 (CDT)
- ZIP codes: 51601, 51639
- GNIS feature ID: 0467834

Fisher Township is one of thirteen townships in Fremont County, Iowa, United States. As of the 2010 census, its population was 698 and it contained 341 housing units.

== History ==
Fisher Township was named for Edward Fisher, a pioneer settler.

== Geography ==
As of the 2010 census, Fisher Township covered an area of 40.45 square miles (104.8 km^{2}), all land.

=== Cities, towns, villages ===
- Farragut (vast majority)
- Shenandoah (west quarter)

=== Cemeteries ===
The township contains Farragut Cemetery and Manti Cemetery.

=== Transportation ===
- Iowa Highway 2
- U.S. Route 59

== School districts ==
- Shenandoah Community School District

== Political districts ==
- Iowa's 3rd congressional district
- State House District 23
- State Senate District 12
