= Locust Grove Township =

Locust Grove Township may refer to the following places in the United States:

- Locust Grove Township, Fremont County, Iowa
- Locust Grove Township, Jefferson County, Iowa
