= Fremont County Courthouse =

Fremont County Courthouse may refer to:

- Fremont County Courthouse (Idaho), St. Anthony, Idaho
- Fremont County Courthouse (Iowa), Sidney, Iowa
