= Simons Elementary School =

Simons Elementary School may refer to:

- James Simons Elementary School a.k.a. James Simons Montessori School - Charleston, South Carolina - Charleston County School District
- Marnie Simons Elementary School - Hamburg, Iowa - Hamburg Community School District
