= McPaul, Iowa =

- Unincorporated community
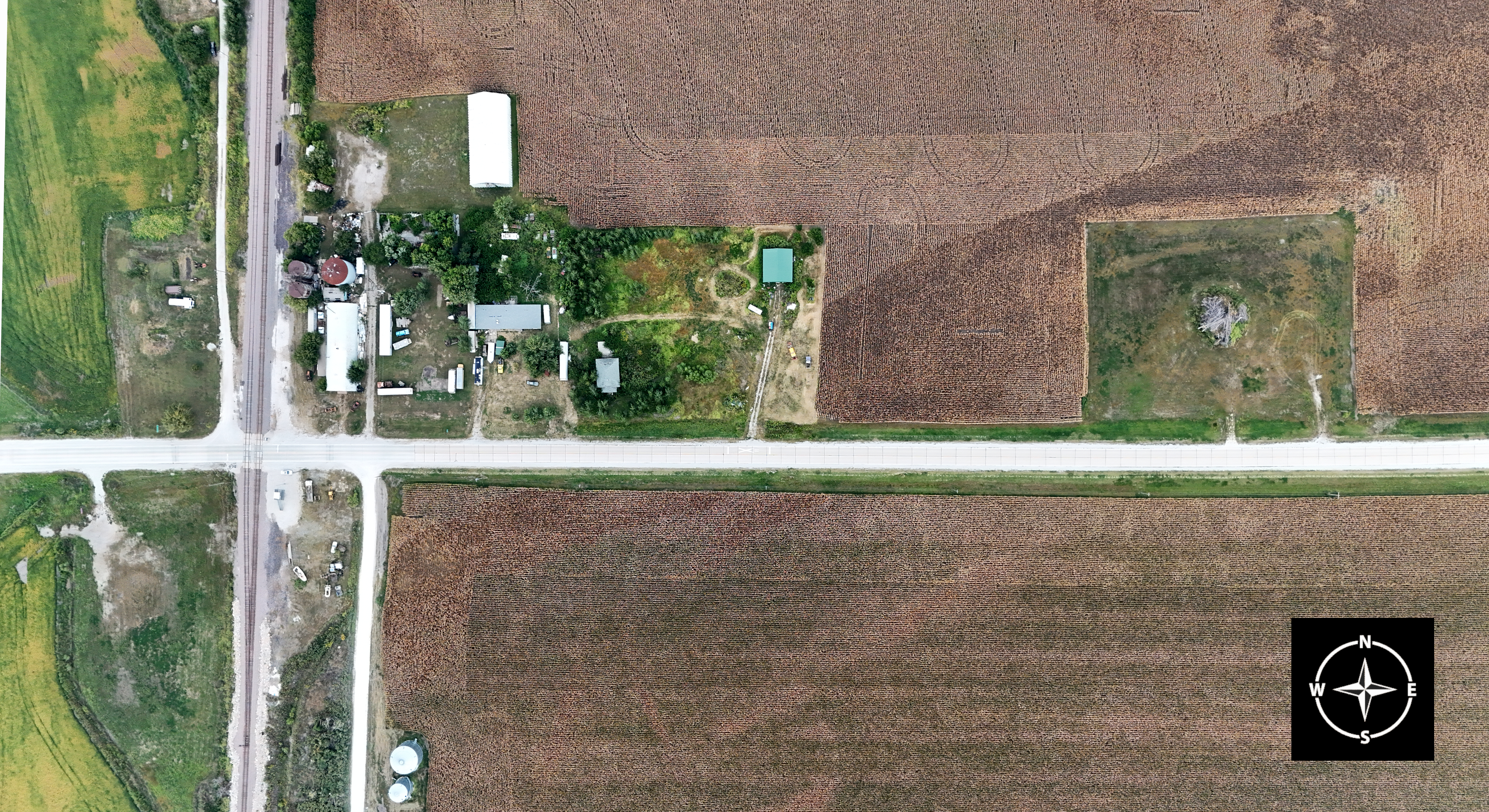
- An aerial photo of McPaul, taken on September 12, 2024

- Location within Iowa Location within the United States
- Coordinates: 40°49′19″N 95°48′10″W
- Country: United States
- State: Iowa
- County: Fremont County
- Elevation: 941 ft (287 m)
- Time zone: UTC-6 (Central (CST))
  - Summer (DST): UTC-5 (CDT)

McPaul is a former townsite and unincorporated community in Fremont County, Iowa, United States. It was located at the intersection of County Roads J18 and L31, near the Missouri River. It is three miles west of Thurman.

== History ==
McPaul was founded as a railroad town. The Kansas City, St. Joseph and Council Bluffs Railroad passed through McPaul in the late 1800s. Much of modern-day Interstate 29 covers the former townsite; only a few scattered houses remain. The McPaul State Wildlife Management Area is located north of the townsite.

McPaul's population was 100 in 1925. The population was 47 in 1940.

McPaul was impacted by the 2019 Midwestern U.S. floods. One homeowner in McPaul had to wait 180 days for floodwater to drain; the home flooded again five days later. The McPaul exit off Interstate 29 was still closed, with visible standing water, in early October. Buyouts were planned for local residents.
