= Nishnabotna High School =

Defunct high school in Iowa, USA

Coordinates: 40°43′21″N 95°28′53″W

- Farragut, Fremont County, Iowa; United States

Information
- Established: 2011
- Closed: 2016
- School district: Farragut Community School District in conjunction with Hamburg Community School District
- Enrollment: c.120

Nishnabotna Junior-Senior High School was a secondary school in Farragut, Iowa. It was operated by the Farragut Community School District in association with the Hamburg Community School District. The school served the communities of Farragut, Imogene, and Riverton in the Farragut district and Hamburg in the Hamburg district. Its mascot was the blue devil. It opened in 2011 and closed in 2016.

Its nickname was "Nish". It had about 120 students prior to its closure. From 2011 the Farragut and Hamburg districts jointly used the name Nishnabotna Community School District, although the district never legally existed, as a vote to formally create it failed, and the Farragut district was dissolved by the State of Iowa in 2016.

== History ==
It was established after the Farragut and Hamburg school districts agreed to do a "grade-sharing" arrangement in which students from one district attended another district for certain grade levels so the two could save resources. In 2011 the Farragut high school was replaced by Nishnabotna and the Hamburg high school closed. In order to merge two different sets of athletic teams and traditions, Nishnabotna High had a completely separate athletic mascot.

In 2012 some students from Hamburg stated they did not feel like they belonged to Nishnabotna High. A former teacher at Farragut High, Pat Shipley, stated in an article in NEA Today that the Farragut and Hamburg communities had difficulty adjusting to the consolidated school since they were about 20 miles (32 km) apart, even though the students themselves adjusted. Initially Nishnabotna received the senior high school students in both districts. In 2015 the grade-sharing arrangement was changed in which all levels of secondary students, middle and high, went to Farragut, and therefore, Nishnabotna.

There was a vote to legally consolidate the Farragut and Hamburg school districts into a single Nishnabotna Community School District, but the Hamburg residents voted it down on a 271-264 basis, while Farragut residents had approved on a 371-32 basis. Nishnabotna High students made a protest to criticize the decision from the Hamburg side.

In 2015 the Iowa state government agreed to shut down the Farragut district, and therefore Nishnabotna High, effective 2016. Nishnabotna High students had submitted statements asking for the Iowa Board of Education to not close the school, and the Nishnabotna High student council had gathered those statements.
