= Bartlett, Iowa =

- Census-designated place
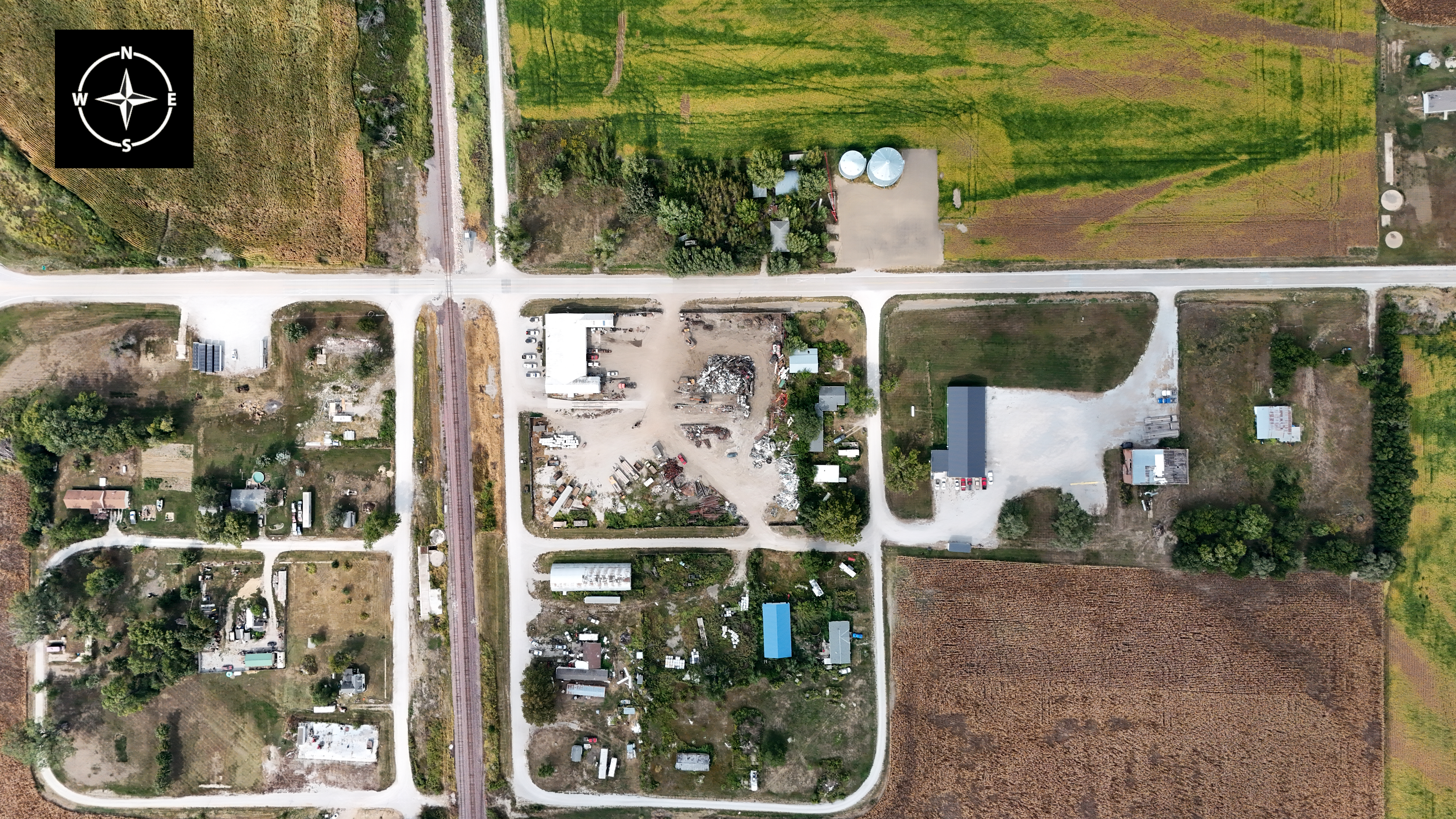
- An aerial view of Bartlett, taken on September 12, 2024

- Location in the state of Iowa
- Coordinates: 40°53′07″N 95°47′41″W
- Country: USA
- State: Iowa
- County: Fremont County

Area
  - Total: 0.40 sq mi (1.04 km^{2})
  - Land: 0.40 sq mi (1.04 km^{2})
  - Water: 0 sq mi (0.00 km^{2})
- Elevation: 945 ft (288 m)

Population (2020)
  - Total: 5
  - Density: 12.5/sq mi (4.82/km^{2})
- Time zone: UTC-6 (Central (CST))
  - Summer (DST): UTC-5 (CDT)
- ZIP code: 51654
- FIPS code: 19-04735
- GNIS feature ID: 2583478

Bartlett is an unincorporated community and census-designated place (CDP) in Fremont County, Iowa, United States. As of the 2020 census, it had a population of 5. It is located at the intersection of County Road L31 and Western Avenue, near Interstate 29 and the Missouri River and is 5 miles (8 km) northwest of Thurman.

== History ==
Bartlett was named after Annie Bartlett Phelps, wife of a railroad engineer. Bartlett was founded as a railroad town; rail service was established between Bartlett and Council Bluffs in January 1867. The population was 125 in 1940.

== Geography ==
According to the United States Census Bureau, the CDP has a total area of 0.40 square miles (1.04 km^{2}), all land.

== Demographics ==
Historical population
Census	Pop.	Note	%±
2010	50		—
2020	5		−90.0%
U.S. Decennial Census

=== 2020 census ===
As of the census of 2020, there were 5 people, 0 households, and 0 families residing in the city. The population density was 12.5 inhabitants per square mile (4.8/km^{2}). There were 9 housing units at an average density of 22.5 per square mile (8.7/km^{2}). The racial makeup of the city was 60.0% White, 0.0% Black or African American, 0.0% Native American, 0.0% Asian, 0.0% Pacific Islander, 0.0% from other races and 40.0% from two or more races. Hispanic or Latino persons of any race comprised 0.0% of the population.

The median age in the city was 31.2 years. 40.0% of the residents were under the age of 20; 0.0% were between the ages of 20 and 24; 60.0% were from 25 and 44; 0.0% were from 45 and 64; and 0.0% were 65 years of age or older. The gender makeup of the city was 20.0% male and 80.0% female.

=== 2010 census ===
As of the census of 2010, there were 50 people, 23 households, and 15 families residing in the town. The population density was 125 inhabitants per square mile (48/km^{2}). There were 25 housing units at an average density of 62.5 per square mile (24.1/km^{2}). The racial makeup of the town was 92.0% White, 2.0% African American, 4.0% Native American, and 2.0% from two or more races.

There were 23 households, out of which 13.0% had children under the age of 18 living with them, 47.8% were married couples living together, 8.7% had a female householder with no husband present, 8.7% had a male householder with no wife present, and 34.8% were non-families. 21.7% of all households were made up of individuals. The average household size was 2.17 and the average family size was 2.53.

In the city the population was spread out, with 16% under the age of 18, 14% from 18 to 24, 16% from 25 to 44, 32% from 45 to 64, and 22% who were 65 years of age or older. The median age was 49 years. The gender makeup of the city was 58.0% male and 42.0% female.

== Education ==
It is in the Fremont-Mills Community School District.
