= Farragut, Iowa =

- City
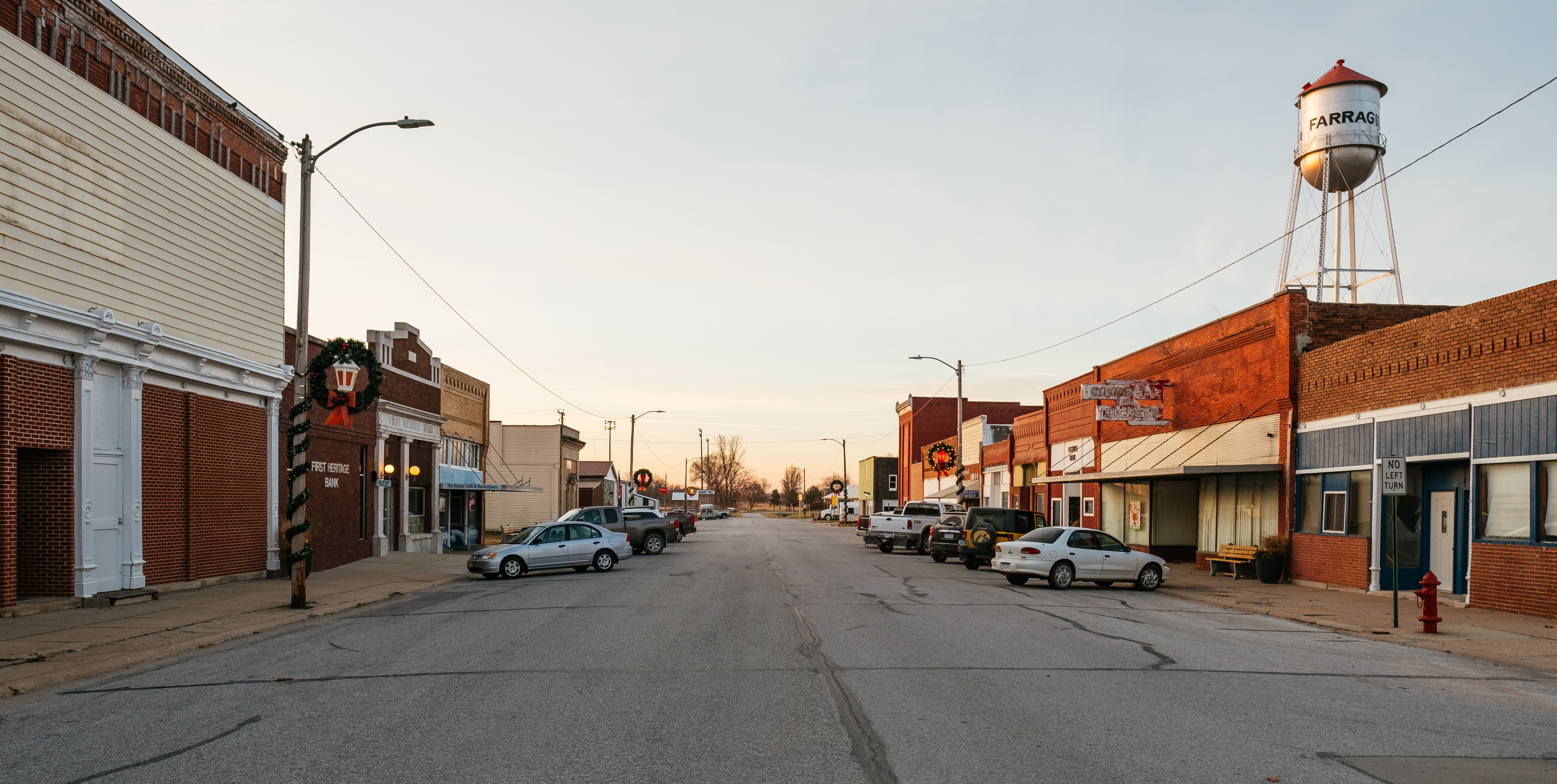
- Downtown Farragut

- Location of Farragut, Iowa
- Coordinates: 40°43′12″N 95°28′51″W
- Country: USA
- State: Iowa
- County: Fremont

Area
  - Total: 0.40 sq mi (1.04 km^{2})
  - Land: 0.40 sq mi (1.04 km^{2})
  - Water: 0 sq mi (0.00 km^{2})
- Elevation: 961 ft (293 m)

Population (2020)
  - Total: 490
  - Density: 1,221.9/sq mi (471.76/km^{2})
- Time zone: UTC-6 (Central (CST))
  - Summer (DST): UTC-5 (CDT)
- ZIP code: 51639
- Area code: 712
- FIPS code: 19-26985
- GNIS feature ID: 2394751

Farragut is a city in Fremont County, Iowa, United States. The population was 490 at the time of the 2020 census.

== History ==
Farragut had its start in the year 1870 by the building of the Burlington & Missouri River Railroad through that territory. It is named for Admiral David Farragut.

== Geography ==
Farragut is located near the East Nishnabotna River.

According to the United States Census Bureau, the city has a total area of 0.41 square miles (1.06 km^{2}), all of it land.

== Demographics ==
Historical populations
Year	Pop.	±%
1880	380	—
1890	406	+6.8%
1900	514	+26.6%
1910	431	−16.1%
1920	494	+14.6%
1930	523	+5.9%
1940	496	−5.2%
1950	495	−0.2%
1960	495	+0.0%
1970	521	+5.3%
1980	603	+15.7%
1990	498	−17.4%
2000	509	+2.2%
2010	485	−4.7%
2020	490	+1.0%
Source:"U.S. Census website". United States Census Bureau. and Iowa Data Center; Source: U.S. Decennial Census

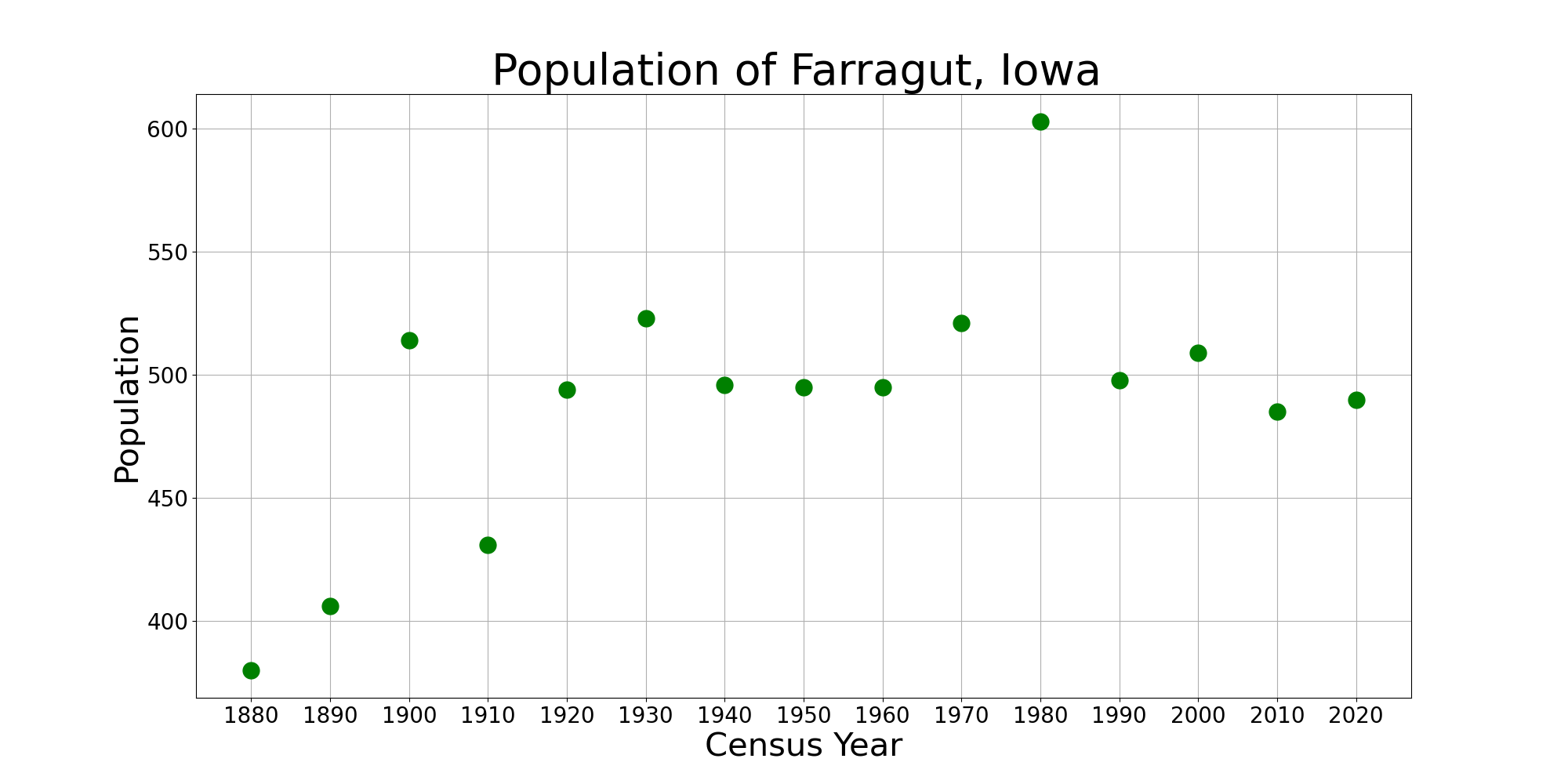
The population of Farragut, Iowa from US census data

=== 2020 census ===
As of the census of 2020, there were 490 people, 221 households, and 126 families residing in the city. The population density was 1,221.8 inhabitants per square mile (471.8/km^{2}). There were 245 housing units at an average density of 610.9 per square mile (235.9/km^{2}). The racial makeup of the city was 94.7% White, 0.6% Black or African American, 0.0% Native American, 0.6% Asian, 0.0% Pacific Islander, 0.2% from other races and 3.9% from two or more races. Hispanic or Latino persons of any race comprised 2.0% of the population.

Of the 221 households, 24.0% of which had children under the age of 18 living with them, 43.4% were married couples living together, 13.6% were cohabitating couples, 22.6% had a female householder with no spouse or partner present and 20.4% had a male householder with no spouse or partner present. 43.0% of all households were non-families. 35.3% of all households were made up of individuals, 15.4% had someone living alone who was 65 years old or older.

The median age in the city was 42.8 years. 24.1% of the residents were under the age of 20; 3.5% were between the ages of 20 and 24; 25.1% were from 25 and 44; 27.3% were from 45 and 64; and 20.0% were 65 years of age or older. The gender makeup of the city was 50.2% male and 49.8% female.

=== 2010 census ===
As of the census of 2010, there were 485 people, 215 households, and 137 families residing in the city. The population density was 1,182.9 inhabitants per square mile (456.7/km^{2}). There were 229 housing units at an average density of 558.5 per square mile (215.6/km^{2}). The racial makeup of the city was 99.6% White, 0.2% Native American, and 0.2% from two or more races. Hispanic or Latino of any race were 2.3% of the population.

There were 215 households, of which 29.8% had children under the age of 18 living with them, 53.0% were married couples living together, 7.4% had a female householder with no husband present, 3.3% had a male householder with no wife present, and 36.3% were non-families. 34.4% of all households were made up of individuals, and 19.1% had someone living alone who was 65 years of age or older. The average household size was 2.26 and the average family size was 2.89.

The median age in the city was 46 years. 22.9% of residents were under the age of 18; 6.4% were between the ages of 18 and 24; 18.4% were from 25 to 44; 31.4% were from 45 to 64; and 21% were 65 years of age or older. The gender makeup of the city was 43.1% male and 56.9% female.

=== 2000 census ===
As of the census of 2000, there were 509 people, 221 households, and 144 families residing in the city. The population density was 1,390.2 inhabitants per square mile (536.8/km^{2}). There were 234 housing units at an average density of 639.1 per square mile (246.8/km^{2}). The racial makeup of the city was 97.64% White, 0.39% Asian, 0.98% from other races, and 0.98% from two or more races. Hispanic or Latino of any race were 1.57% of the population.

There were 221 households, out of which 27.6% had children under the age of 18 living with them, 55.7% were married couples living together, 7.2% had a female householder with no husband present, and 34.8% were non-families. 32.1% of all households were made up of individuals, and 22.2% had someone living alone who was 65 years of age or older. The average household size was 2.30 and the average family size was 2.85.

25.9% are under the age of 18, 5.1% from 18 to 24, 23.2% from 25 to 44, 22.0% from 45 to 64, and 23.8% who were 65 years of age or older. The median age was 42 years. For every 100 females, there were 85.1 males. For every 100 females age 18 and over, there were 80.4 males.

The median income for a household in the city was $34,250, and the median income for a family was $47,813. Males had a median income of $31,397 versus $21,000 for females. The per capita income for the city was $16,667. About 3.9% of families and 7.5% of the population were below the poverty line, including none of those under age 18 and 10.9% of those age 65 or over.

== Education ==
Almost all of it is within the Shenandoah Community School District. A portion to the west is within the Sidney Community School District.

It was served by the Farragut Community School District until it closed in 2016. From about 2010 until 2016 Farragut was in a grade-sharing relationship with the Hamburg Community School District; prior to 2015 Farragut students had to go to Hamburg for middle school, while after 2015 all elementary school students went to Hamburg. Nishnabotna High School in Farragut became the community high school for both Farragut and Hamburg. Nishnabotna High closed when the Farragut district dissolved.

== Transportation ==
While there is no fixed-route transit service in Farragut, intercity bus service is provided by Jefferson Lines in nearby Shenandoah.
