= Anderson, Iowa =

- Census-designated place
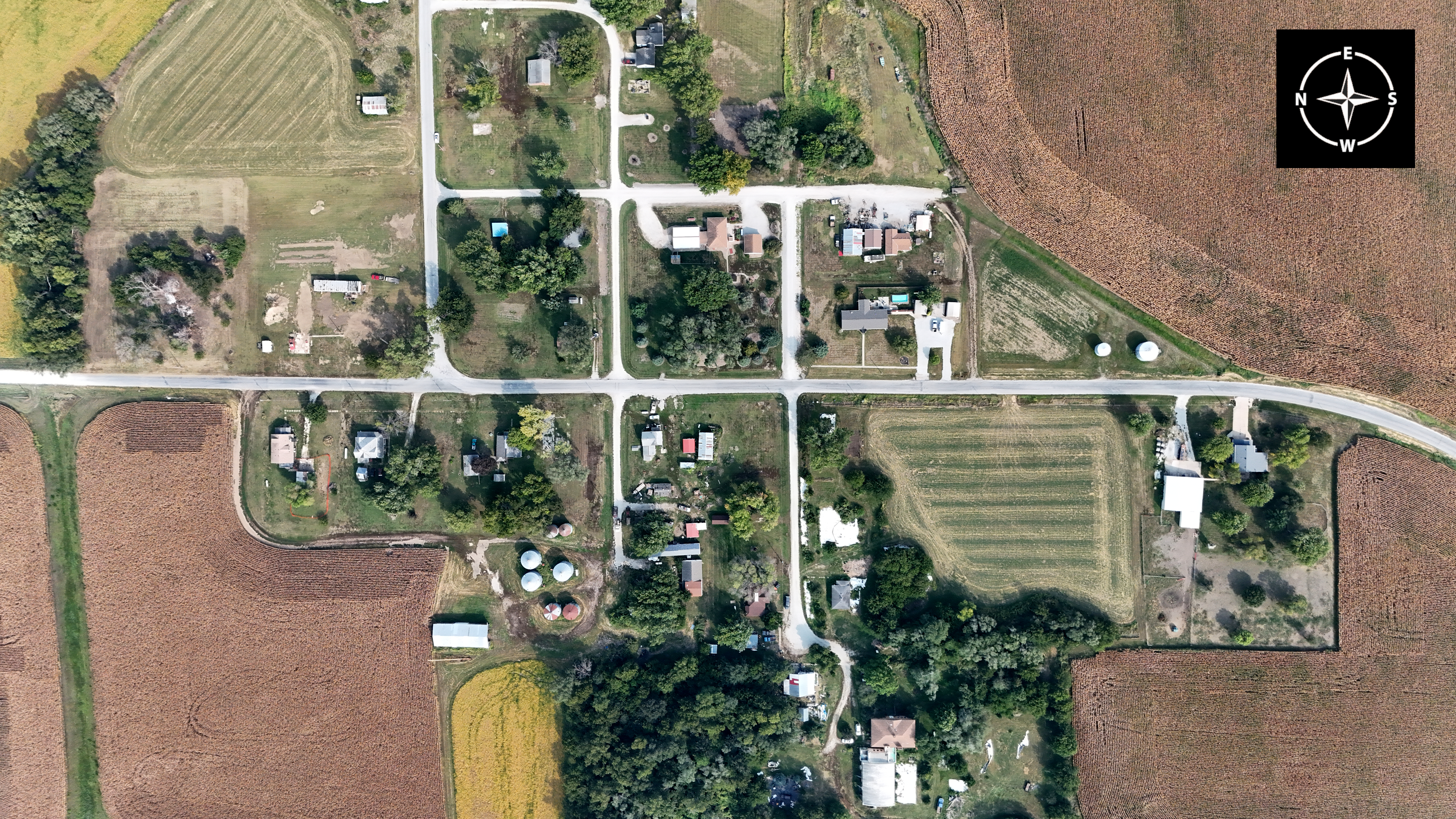
- An aerial photo of Anderson, taken on September 12, 2024

- Location within Iowa
- Coordinates: 40°47′54″N 95°36′31″W
- Country: United States
- State: Iowa
- County: Fremont

Area
  - Total: 0.33 sq mi (0.85 km^{2})
  - Land: 0.33 sq mi (0.85 km^{2})
  - Water: 0 sq mi (0.00 km^{2})
- Elevation: 994 ft (303 m)

Population (2020)
  - Total: 37
  - Density: 112.5/sq mi (43.44/km^{2})
- ZIP code: 51652
- Area code: 712
- FIPS code: 19-02035
- GNIS feature ID: 2583477

Anderson is a CDP in Fremont County, Iowa, United States. In 2020, the population of the CDP was 37.

== Demographics ==
Historical population
Census	Pop.	Note	%±
2010	65		—
2020	37		−43.1%
U.S. Decennial Census

=== 2020 census ===
As of the census of 2020, there were 37 people, 16 households, and 11 families residing in the community. The population density was 112.5 inhabitants per square mile (43.4/km^{2}). There were 20 housing units at an average density of 60.8 per square mile (23.5/km^{2}). The racial makeup of the community was 97.3% White, 0.0% Black or African American, 0.0% Native American, 0.0% Asian, 0.0% Pacific Islander, 0.0% from other races and 2.7% from two or more races. Hispanic or Latino persons of any race comprised 2.7% of the population.

Of the 16 households, 18.8% of which had children under the age of 18 living with them, 62.5% were married couples living together, 6.2% were cohabitating couples, 6.2% had a female householder with no spouse or partner present and 25.0% had a male householder with no spouse or partner present. 31.2% of all households were non-families. 31.2% of all households were made up of individuals, 12.5% had someone living alone who was 65 years old or older.

The median age in the community was 48.2 years. 21.6% of the residents were under the age of 20; 0.0% were between the ages of 20 and 24; 16.2% were from 25 and 44; 56.8% were from 45 and 64; and 5.4% were 65 years of age or older. The gender makeup of the community was 59.5% male and 40.5% female.

== Education ==
It is in the Sidney Community School District.

== Transportation ==
While there is no fixed-route transit service in Anderson, intercity bus service is provided by Jefferson Lines in nearby Shenandoah.
