= Fremont County, Iowa =

County in Iowa, United States

- County
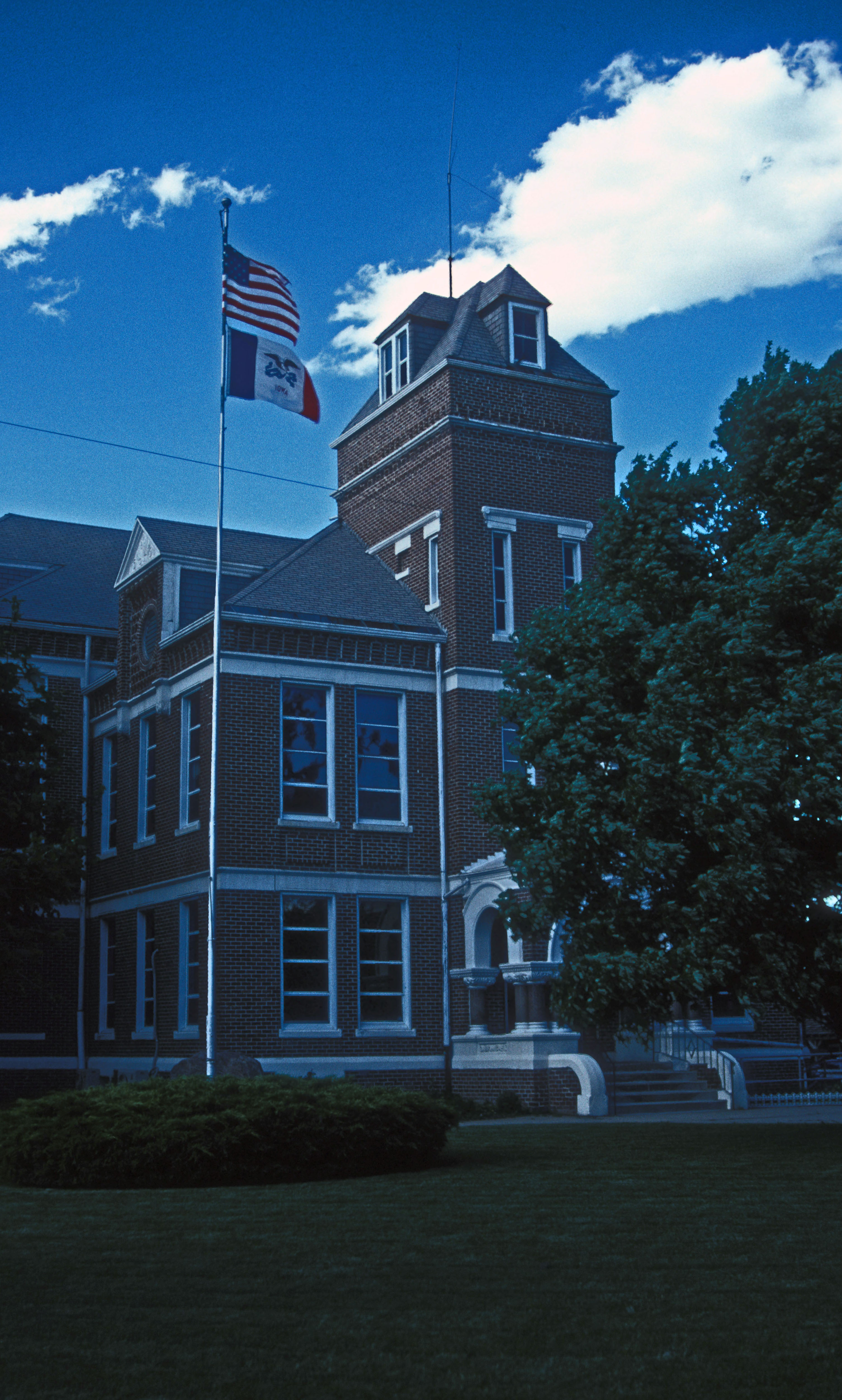
- Fremont County Courthouse

- Location within the U.S. state of Iowa
- Coordinates: 40°44′38″N 95°36′31″W
- Country: United States
- State: Iowa
- Founded: 1847
- Named for: John C. Fremont
- Seat: Sidney
- Largest city: Sidney

Area
  - Total: 517 sq mi (1,340 km^{2})
  - Land: 511 sq mi (1,320 km^{2})
  - Water: 5.5 sq mi (14 km^{2}) 1.1%

Population (2020)
  - Total: 6,605
  - Estimate (2025): 6,522 ▼
  - Density: 12.9/sq mi (4.99/km^{2})
- Time zone: UTC−6 (Central)
  - Summer (DST): UTC−5 (CDT)
- Congressional district: 3rd
- Website: www.fremontcountyia.gov
- Iowa county number 36

Fremont County is a county located in the U.S. state of Iowa. As of the 2020 census the population was 6,605, making it the state's seventh-least populous county. The county seat and the largest city is Sidney. The county was formed in 1847 and named for the military officer John C. Frémont.

== Geography ==
According to the United States Census Bureau, the county has a total area of 517 square miles (1,340 km^{2}), of which 511 square miles (1,320 km^{2}) is land and 5.5 square miles (14 km^{2}) (1.1%) is water.

=== Major highways ===
- Interstate 29
- U.S. Highway 59
- U.S. Highway 275
- Iowa Highway 2
- Iowa Highway 333

=== Adjacent counties ===
- Mills County (north)
- Page County (east)
- Atchison County, Missouri (south)
- Otoe County, Nebraska (southwest)
- Cass County, Nebraska (northwest)

== History ==
Fremont County was impacted by the 2019 Midwestern U.S. floods. Buyouts are under discussion for residents in Hamburg and McPaul.

On April 17, 2025, several homes and businesses Fremont County were damaged by an intense hailstorm. The hail was caused by a larger storm system that spawned a tornado in southwestern Iowa.

== Demographics ==
Historical population
Census	Pop.	Note	%±
1850	1,244		—
1860	5,074		307.9%
1870	11,174		120.2%
1880	17,652		58.0%
1890	16,842		−4.6%
1900	18,546		10.1%
1910	15,623		−15.8%
1920	15,447		−1.1%
1930	15,533		0.6%
1940	14,645		−5.7%
1950	12,323		−15.9%
1960	10,282		−16.6%
1970	9,282		−9.7%
1980	9,401		1.3%
1990	8,226		−12.5%
2000	8,010		−2.6%
2010	7,441		−7.1%
2020	6,605		−11.2%
2025 (est.)	6,522	▼	−1.3%
U.S. Decennial Census; 1790–1960 1900–1990; 1990–2000 2010–2020

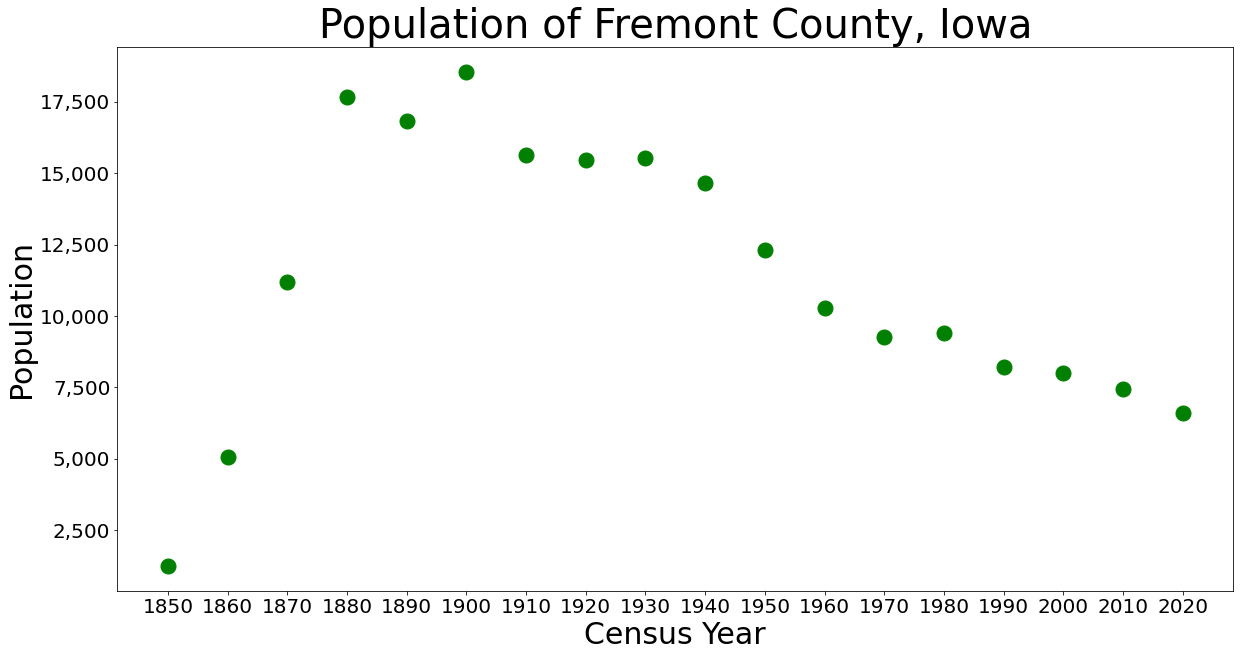
Population of Fremont County from US census data

=== 2020 census ===
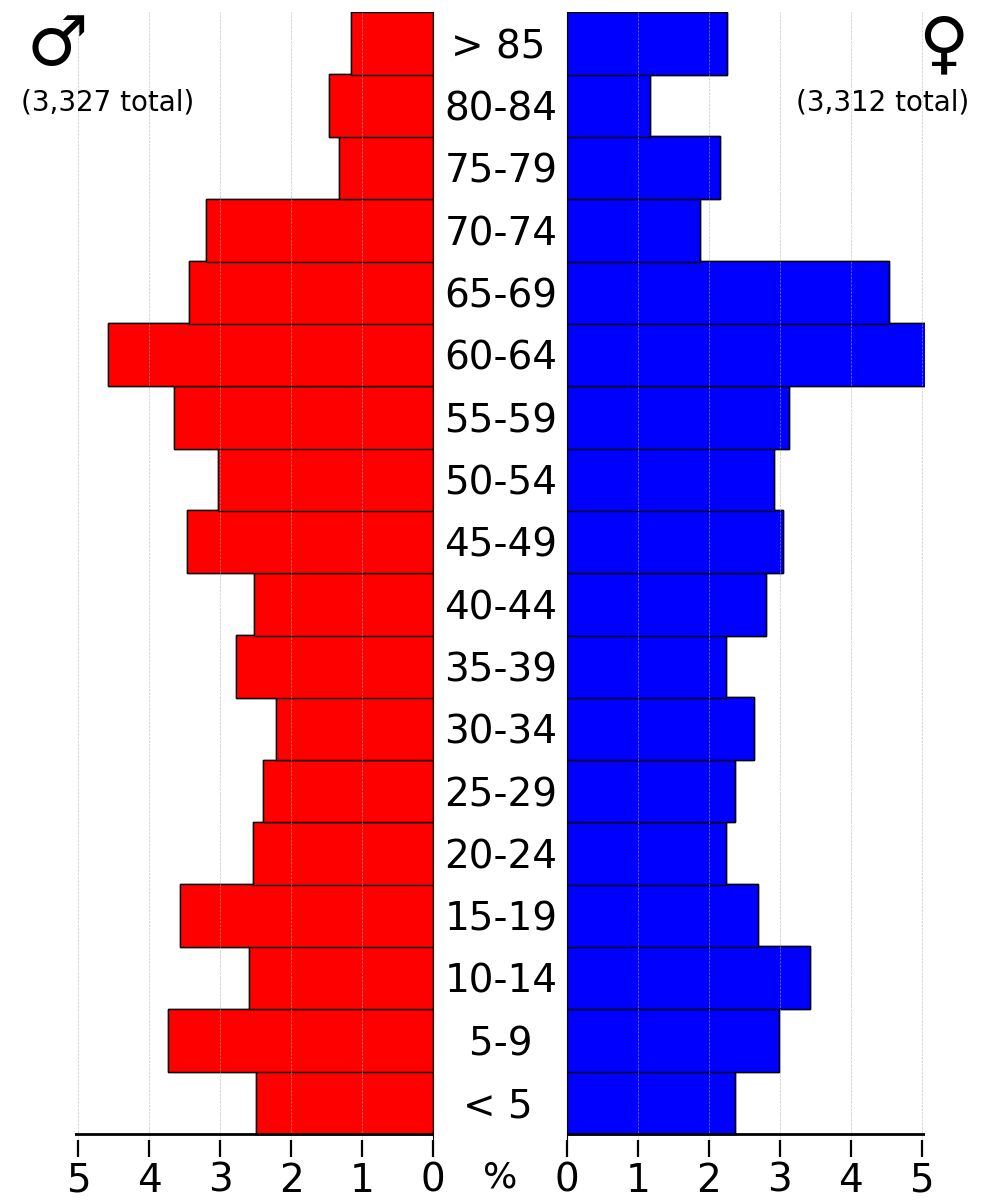
2022 US Census population pyramid for Fremont County from ACS 5-year estimates

As of the 2020 census, the county had a population of 6,605 and a population density of 12.8/sq mi (4.9/km^{2}). The median age was 45.7 years, 22.5% of residents were under the age of 18, and 23.2% of residents were 65 years of age or older. For every 100 females there were 101.4 males, and for every 100 females age 18 and over there were 99.6 males age 18 and over.

95.65% of the population reported being of one race. The racial makeup of the county was 93.9% White, 0.2% Black or African American, 0.3% American Indian and Alaska Native, 0.2% Asian, 0.1% Native Hawaiian and Pacific Islander, 1.1% from some other race, and 4.3% from two or more races. Hispanic or Latino residents of any race comprised 2.9% of the population.

0.1% of residents lived in urban areas, while 99.9% lived in rural areas.

There were 2,720 households in the county, of which 26.3% had children under the age of 18 living in them. Of all households, 53.2% were married-couple households, 18.5% were households with a male householder and no spouse or partner present, and 20.4% were households with a female householder and no spouse or partner present. About 27.5% of all households were made up of individuals and 13.6% had someone living alone who was 65 years of age or older.

There were 3,110 housing units, of which 12.5% were vacant. Among occupied housing units, 77.3% were owner-occupied and 22.7% were renter-occupied. The homeowner vacancy rate was 2.6% and the rental vacancy rate was 5.4%.

=== 2010 census ===
The 2010 census recorded a population of 7,441 in the county, with a population density of 14.6/sq mi (5.6/km^{2}). There were 3,431 housing units, of which 3,064 were occupied.

=== 2000 census ===
As of the census of 2000, there were 8,010 people, 3,199 households, and 2,242 families residing in the county. The population density was 16 people per square mile (6.2 people/km^{2}). There were 3,514 housing units at an average density of 7 units per square mile (2.7 units/km^{2}). The racial makeup of the county was 98.01% White, 0.04% Black or African American, 0.24% Native American, 0.24% Asian, 0.96% from other races, and 0.51% from two or more races. 2.17% of the population were Hispanic or Latino of any race.

There were 3,199 households, out of which 30.20% had children under the age of 18 living with them, 58.90% were married couples living together, 8.20% had a female householder with no husband present, and 29.90% were non-families. 26.30% of all households were made up of individuals, and 14.90% had someone living alone who was 65 years of age or older. The average household size was 2.45 and the average family size was 2.93.

In the county, the population was spread out, with 25.10% under the age of 18, 6.00% from 18 to 24, 24.30% from 25 to 44, 24.70% from 45 to 64, and 19.80% who were 65 years of age or older. The median age was 41 years. For every 100 females there were 95.50 males. For every 100 females age 18 and over, there were 91.80 males.

The median income for a household in the county was $38,345, and the median income for a family was $46,547. Males had a median income of $30,822 versus $23,003 for females. The per capita income for the county was $18,081. About 6.50% of families and 9.50% of the population were below the poverty line, including 11.40% of those under age 18 and 10.70% of those age 65 or over.

== Communities ==
=== Cities ===
- Farragut
- Hamburg
- Imogene
- Randolph
- Riverton
- Shenandoah (part)
- Sidney
- Tabor
- Thurman

=== Census-designated places ===
- Anderson
- Bartlett
- Percival

=== Other unincorporated places ===
- Civil Bend
- McPaul

=== Townships ===
Fremont County is divided into thirteen townships:

- Benton
- Fisher
- Green
- Locust Grove
- Madison
- Monroe
- Prairie
- Riverside
- Riverton
- Scott
- Sidney
- Walnut
- Washington

=== Population ranking ===
The population ranking of the following table is based on the 2020 census of Fremont County.

† county seat

Rank	City, town, etc.	Municipal type	Population (2020 Census)
1	† Sidney	City	1,070
2	Hamburg	City	890
3	Tabor (partially in Mills County)	City	928 (1,014 total)
4	Farragut	City	490
5	Riverton	City	245
6	Randolph	City	189
7	Thurman	City	167
8	Percival	CDP	53
9	Imogene	City	39
10	Anderson	CDP	37
11	Bartlett	CDP	5
12	Shenandoah (mostly in Page County)	City	0 (4,925 total)

== Politics ==
Prior to 1944, Fremont County was a swing county in presidential elections, voting for the national winner in every election from 1912 to 1940. Starting with the 1944 election, the county has become a Republican Party stronghold, only failing to back a Republican presidential candidate in 1964 amidst Lyndon B. Johnson's national landslide.

United States presidential election results for Fremont County, Iowa
Year	Republican		Democratic		Third party(ies)	
Year	No.	%	No.	%	No.	%
1896	1,948	40.21%	2,857	58.97%	40	0.83%
1900	2,170	46.59%	2,399	51.50%	89	1.91%
1904	2,227	56.94%	1,511	38.63%	173	4.42%
1908	1,949	48.63%	1,979	49.38%	80	2.00%
1912	973	26.30%	1,762	47.63%	964	26.06%
1916	1,732	44.38%	2,085	53.42%	86	2.20%
1920	3,776	59.33%	2,524	39.66%	64	1.01%
1924	3,313	53.24%	2,525	40.58%	385	6.19%
1928	3,597	55.71%	2,822	43.70%	38	0.59%
1932	2,339	33.47%	4,585	65.60%	65	0.93%
1936	3,291	43.21%	4,301	56.47%	25	0.33%
1940	3,825	49.27%	3,914	50.41%	25	0.32%
1944	3,113	52.97%	2,747	46.74%	17	0.29%
1948	2,698	50.17%	2,637	49.03%	43	0.80%
1952	3,802	64.51%	2,085	35.37%	7	0.12%
1956	3,241	58.81%	2,254	40.90%	16	0.29%
1960	3,027	56.73%	2,307	43.23%	2	0.04%
1964	2,044	42.93%	2,703	56.77%	14	0.29%
1968	2,385	55.85%	1,484	34.75%	401	9.39%
1972	2,642	67.62%	1,210	30.97%	55	1.41%
1976	2,163	51.80%	1,964	47.03%	49	1.17%
1980	2,693	65.19%	1,203	29.12%	235	5.69%
1984	2,686	64.77%	1,426	34.39%	35	0.84%
1988	1,946	55.17%	1,547	43.86%	34	0.96%
1992	1,459	37.31%	1,422	36.36%	1,030	26.34%
1996	1,576	44.24%	1,481	41.58%	505	14.18%
2000	2,069	57.22%	1,459	40.35%	88	2.43%
2004	2,362	60.39%	1,510	38.61%	39	1.00%
2008	1,989	51.05%	1,848	47.43%	59	1.51%
2012	1,972	53.76%	1,637	44.63%	59	1.61%
2016	2,407	66.95%	963	26.79%	225	6.26%
2020	2,711	70.29%	1,080	28.00%	66	1.71%
2024	2,711	71.44%	1,023	26.96%	61	1.61%

== Education ==
School districts include:

- Fremont–Mills Community School District
- Hamburg Community School District
- Shenandoah Community School District
- Sidney Community School District

Former school districts:

- Farragut Community School District - Involuntarily dissolved on July 1, 2016.

== See also ==
- Fremont County Courthouse
- National Register of Historic Places listings in Fremont County, Iowa
