= Fremont County Courthouse (Iowa) =

- U.S. National Register of Historic Places
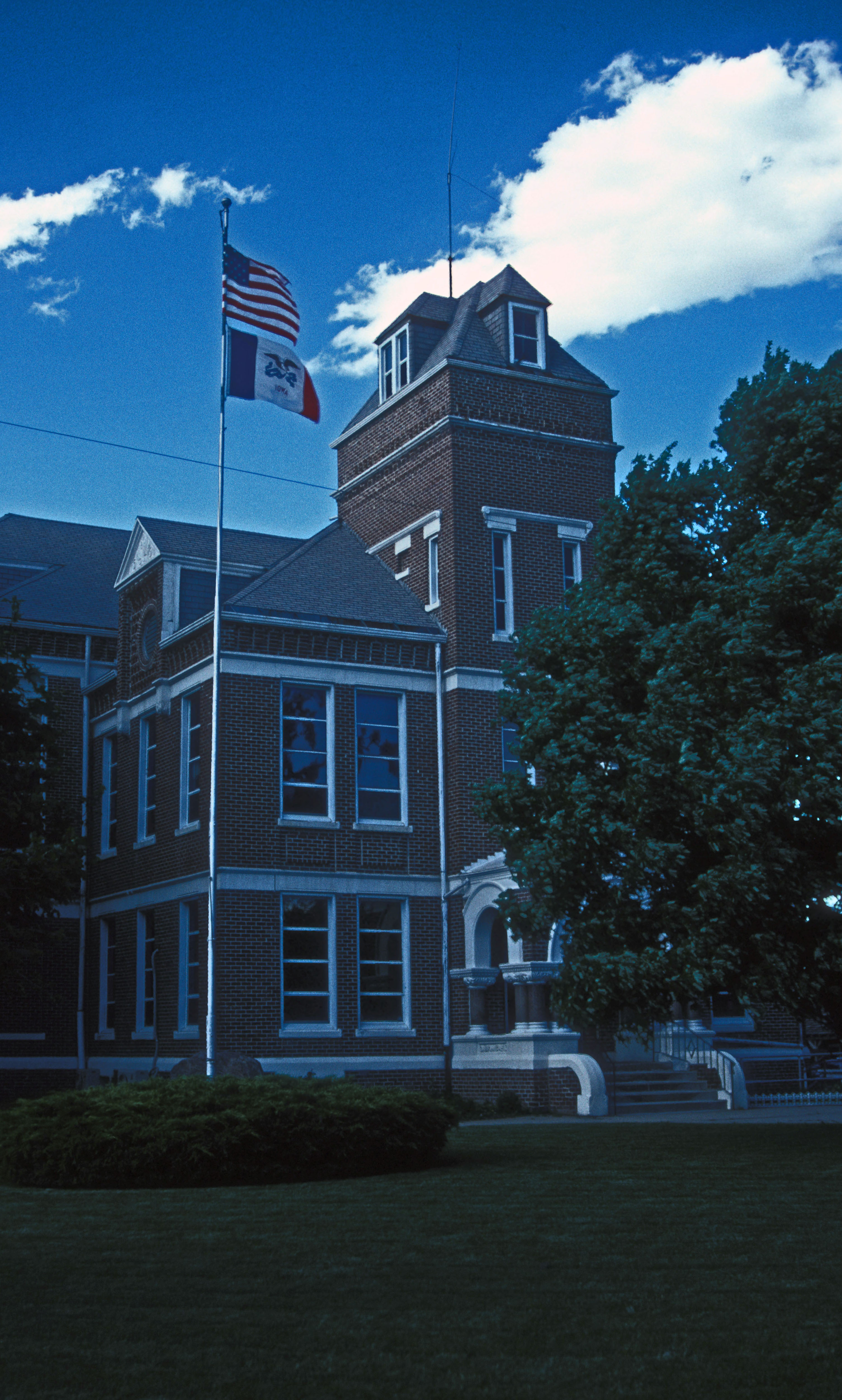

- Location within Iowa Location within the United States
- Location: Clay St. Sidney, Iowa
- Coordinates: 40°44′45″N 95°38′37″W
- Area: less than one acre
- Built: 1889
- MPS: County Courthouses in Iowa TR
- NRHP reference No.: 81000238
- Added to NRHP: July 2, 1981

The Fremont County Courthouse, located in Sidney, Iowa, United States, was built in 1889. It was listed on the National Register of Historic Places in 1981 as a part of the County Courthouses in Iowa Thematic Resource. The courthouse is the second structure to house court functions and county administration.

== History ==
Fremont County was organized in 1850. Its first county seat was in the small town of Austin, a community 7.5 miles (12.1 km) south of Sidney. There were two houses in the small town and court sessions were held in the storeroom of A.H. Argyle's home. The county seat moved to Sydney the following year. In 1860, commissioners erected a two-story brick building that featured a heavy brick tower and a tin roof for $40,000. The county financed its construction through the sale of swampland. The structure was heavily damaged in an explosion in 1863. Its windows and doors were blown out of the structure and the second floor and roof were thrown out of place. While the county spent money to repair the building, the fissures in the walls continued to increase in size in the following years and the decision was made to build a new courthouse.

The current courthouse is a two-story brick structure constructed in 1889. It is rather plain in appearance for the period it was built. The building's primary features includes an entrance porch with round arches perched on short, medieval-looking, granite columns; and the brick wall dormers with triangular pediments and oculus windows. The squat tower has several shed dormers along the roofline. At one time the exterior was covered with stucco. The building is situated on a double square, which is a rarity in Iowa. Its significance is derived from its association with county government, and the political power and prestige of Sidney as the county seat.
