= Imogene, Iowa =

- City
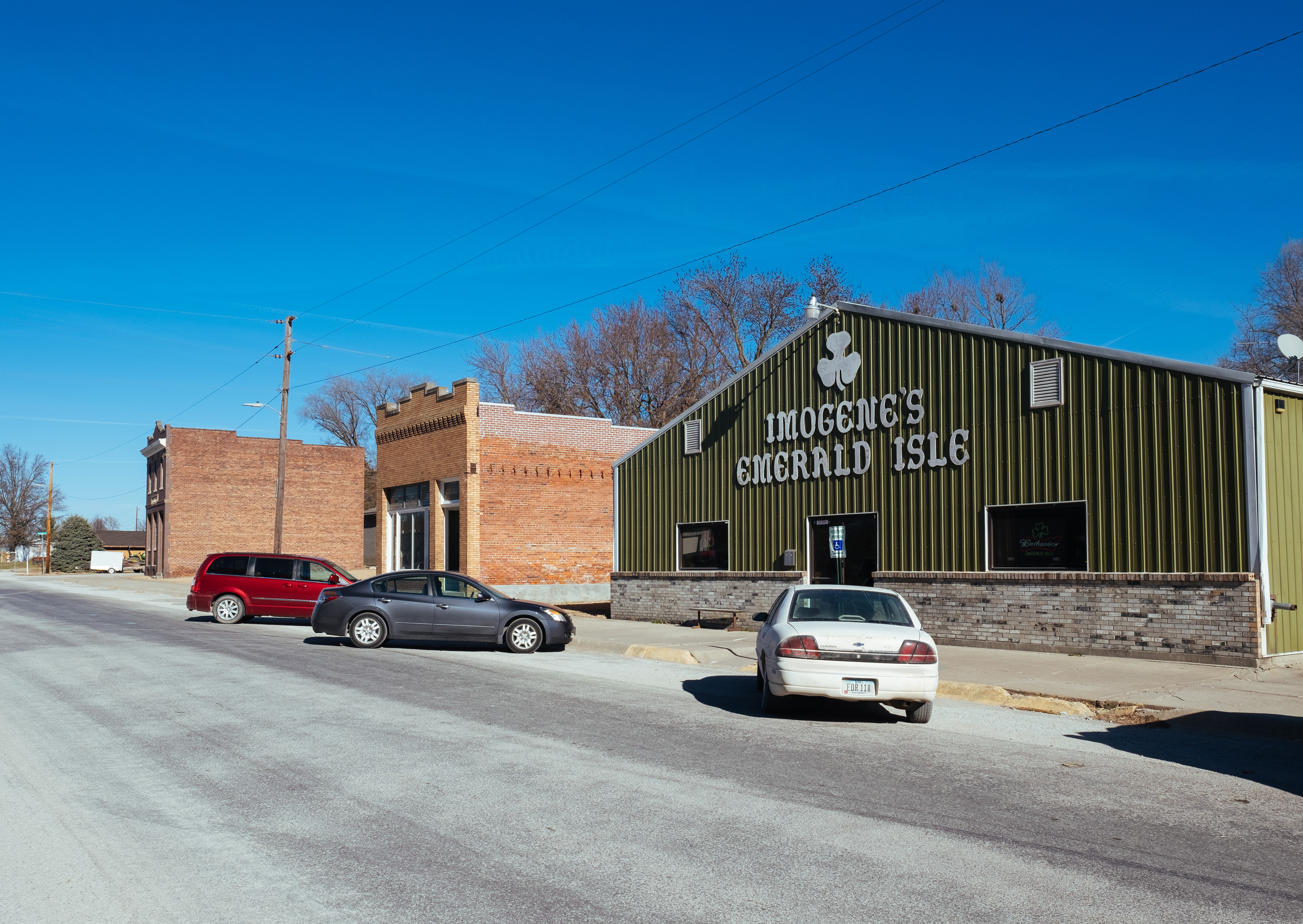
- 397th Ave

- Location of Imogene, Iowa
- Coordinates: 40°52′32″N 95°25′46″W
- Country: USA
- State: Iowa
- County: Fremont

Area
  - Total: 0.49 sq mi (1.28 km^{2})
  - Land: 0.49 sq mi (1.28 km^{2})
  - Water: 0 sq mi (0.00 km^{2})
- Elevation: 1,043 ft (318 m)

Population (2020)
  - Total: 39
  - Density: 79.0/sq mi (30.51/km^{2})
- Time zone: UTC-6 (Central (CST))
  - Summer (DST): UTC-5 (CDT)
- ZIP code: 51645
- Area code: 712
- FIPS code: 19-38055
- GNIS feature ID: 2394465

Imogene is a city in Fremont County, Iowa, United States. The population was 39 at the time of the 2020 census.

== Geography ==
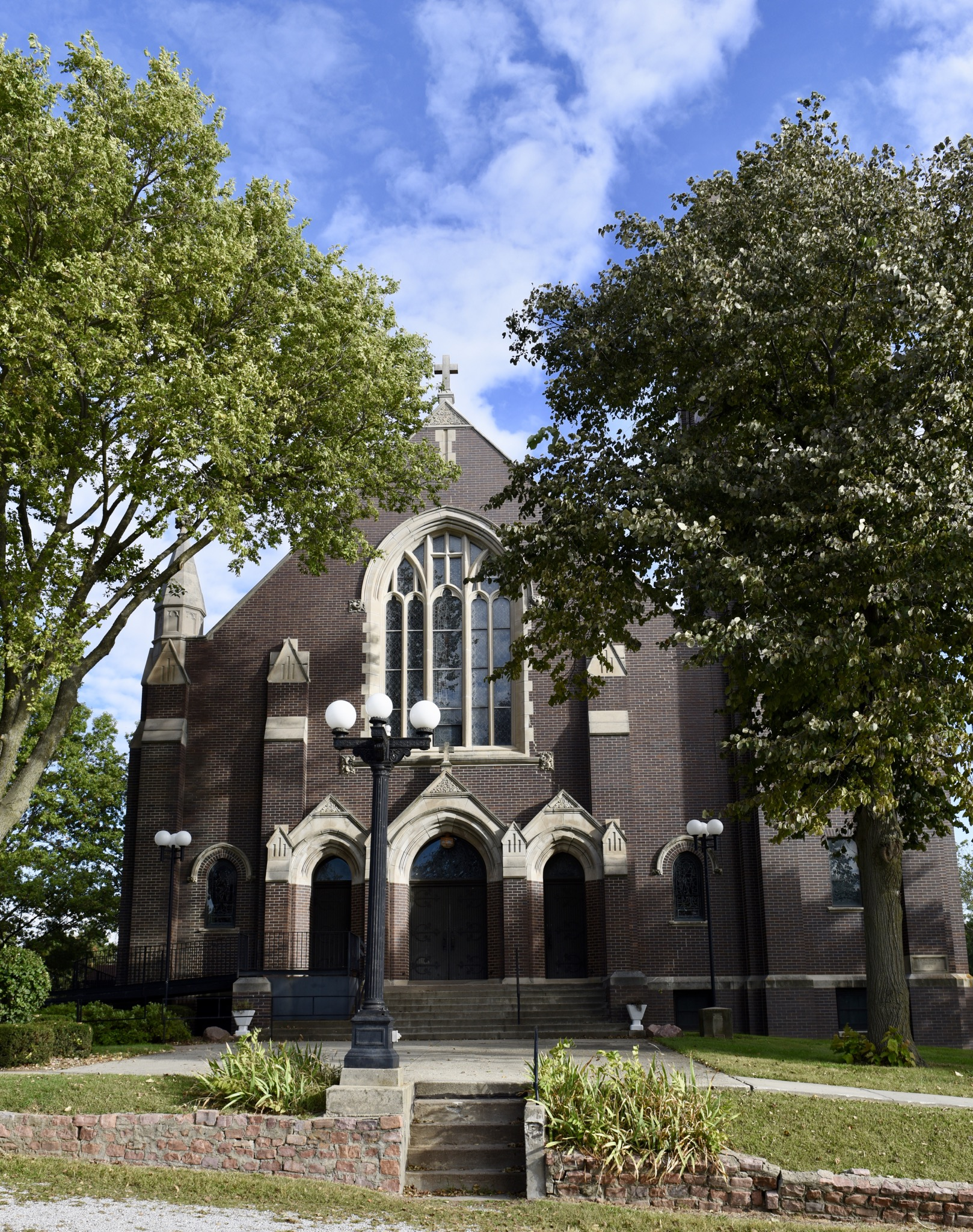
St. Patrick Church

According to the United States Census Bureau, the city has a total area of 0.20 square miles (0.52 km^{2}), all land.

== Demographics ==
Historical populations
Year	Pop.	±%
1880	158	—
1890	279	+76.6%
1900	296	+6.1%
1910	341	+15.2%
1920	268	−21.4%
1930	303	+13.1%
1940	280	−7.6%
1950	274	−2.1%
1960	264	−3.6%
1970	192	−27.3%
1980	188	−2.1%
1990	88	−53.2%
2000	66	−25.0%
2010	72	+9.1%
2020	39	−45.8%
Source:"U.S. Census website". United States Census Bureau. and Iowa Data Center; Source: U.S. Decennial Census

=== 2020 census ===
As of the census of 2020, there were 39 people, 17 households, and 14 families residing in the city. The population density was 79.0 inhabitants per square mile (30.5/km^{2}). There were 17 housing units at an average density of 34.4 per square mile (13.3/km^{2}). The racial makeup of the city was 97.4% White, 0.0% Black or African American, 0.0% Native American, 0.0% Asian, 0.0% Pacific Islander, 2.6% from other races and 0.0% from two or more races. Hispanic or Latino persons of any race comprised 0.0% of the population.

Of the 17 households, 58.8% of which had children under the age of 18 living with them, 52.9% were married couples living together, 5.9% were cohabitating couples, 17.6% had a female householder with no spouse or partner present and 23.5% had a male householder with no spouse or partner present. 17.6% of all households were non-families. 17.6% of all households were made up of individuals, 5.9% had someone living alone who was 65 years old or older.

The median age in the city was 48.5 years. 30.8% of the residents were under the age of 20; 0.0% were between the ages of 20 and 24; 17.9% were from 25 and 44; 25.6% were from 45 and 64; and 25.6% were 65 years of age or older. The gender makeup of the city was 43.6% male and 56.4% female. (b

=== 2010 census ===
As of the census of 2010, there were 72 people, 25 households, and 18 families living in the city. The population density was 360.0 inhabitants per square mile (139.0/km^{2}). There were 28 housing units at an average density of 140.0 per square mile (54.1/km^{2}). The racial makeup of the city was 98.6% White and 1.4% from other races. Hispanic or Latino of any race were 1.4% of the population.

There were 25 households, of which 32.0% had children under the age of 18 living with them, 56.0% were married couples living together, 4.0% had a female householder with no husband present, 12.0% had a male householder with no wife present, and 28.0% were non-families. 20.0% of all households were made up of individuals, and 4% had someone living alone who was 65 years of age or older. The average household size was 2.88 and the average family size was 3.39.

The median age in the city was 44 years. 27.8% of residents were under the age of 18; 5.5% were between the ages of 18 and 24; 18.1% were from 25 to 44; 30.6% were from 45 to 64; and 18.1% were 65 years of age or older. The gender makeup of the city was 54.2% male and 45.8% female.

=== 2000 census ===
As of the census of 2000, there were 66 people, 29 households, and 16 families living in the city. The population density was 330.5 inhabitants per square mile (127.6/km^{2}). There were 38 housing units at an average density of 190.3 per square mile (73.5/km^{2}). The racial makeup of the city was 98.48% White, and 1.52% from two or more races.

There were 29 households, out of which 20.7% had children under the age of 18 living with them, 41.4% were married couples living together, 6.9% had a female householder with no husband present, and 44.8% were non-families. 34.5% of all households were made up of individuals, and 20.7% had someone living alone who was 65 years of age or older. The average household size was 2.28 and the average family size was 2.94.

In the city, the population was spread out, with 22.7% under the age of 18, 7.6% from 18 to 24, 33.3% from 25 to 44, 16.7% from 45 to 64, and 19.7% who were 65 years of age or older. The median age was 37 years. For every 100 females, there were 135.7 males. For every 100 females age 18 and over, there were 112.5 males.

The median income for a household in the city was $41,250, and the median income for a family was $46,667. Males had a median income of $24,688 versus $25,625 for females. The per capita income for the city was $25,329. There were no families and 4.2% of the population living below the poverty line, including no under eighteens and none of those over 64.

== Education ==
Imogene is within the Shenandoah Community School District.

Prior to 2016, Imogene was in the Farragut Community School District, which operated Nishnabotna High School. The Farragut district closed in 2016.

== Transportation ==
While there is no fixed-route transit service in Imogene, intercity bus service is provided by Jefferson Lines in nearby Shenandoah.
