= Randolph, Iowa =

- City
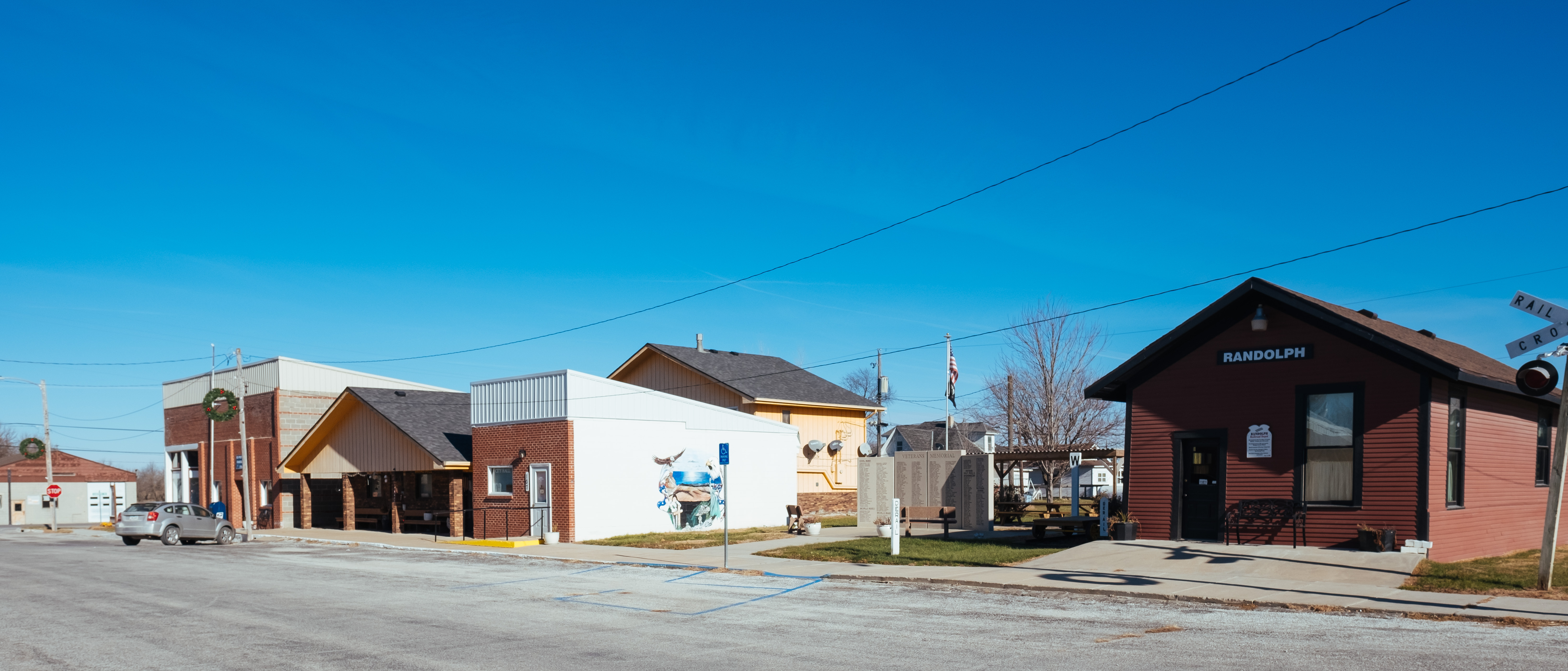
- South Main Street

- Location of Randolph, Iowa
- Coordinates: 40°52′28″N 95°33′53″W
- Country: USA
- State: Iowa
- County: Fremont

Area
  - Total: 0.30 sq mi (0.78 km^{2})
  - Land: 0.30 sq mi (0.78 km^{2})
  - Water: 0 sq mi (0.00 km^{2})
- Elevation: 974 ft (297 m)

Population (2020)
  - Total: 189
  - Density: 629.8/sq mi (243.15/km^{2})
- Time zone: UTC-6 (Central (CST))
  - Summer (DST): UTC-5 (CDT)
- ZIP code: 51649
- Area code: 712
- FIPS code: 19-65640
- GNIS feature ID: 2396317
- Website: randolphiowa.us

Randolph is a city in Fremont County, Iowa, United States. The population was 189 at the time of the 2020 census.

== History ==
Randolph was platted in 1877, shortly before the completion of the railroad through the territory. The community name was bestowed by agriculturalist Frank Peavy, who named it after Lord Randolph Churchill, father of Winston Churchill.

== Geography ==
Randolph is located at the junction of Deer Creek and the West Nishnabotna River.

According to the United States Census Bureau, the city has a total area of 0.32 square miles (0.83 km^{2}), all land.

== Demographics ==
Historical populations
Year	Pop.	±%
1880	213	—
1890	276	+29.6%
1900	373	+35.1%
1910	304	−18.5%
1920	404	+32.9%
1930	344	−14.9%
1940	379	+10.2%
1950	295	−22.2%
1960	257	−12.9%
1970	214	−16.7%
1980	223	+4.2%
1990	243	+9.0%
2000	209	−14.0%
2010	168	−19.6%
2020	189	+12.5%
Source:"U.S. Census website". United States Census Bureau. and Iowa Data Center; Source: U.S. Decennial Census

=== 2020 census ===
As of the census of 2020, there were 189 people, 78 households, and 51 families residing in the city. The population density was 629.8 inhabitants per square mile (243.1/km^{2}). There were 81 housing units at an average density of 269.9 per square mile (104.2/km^{2}). The racial makeup of the city was 96.8% White, 1.1% Black or African American, 0.0% Native American, 0.0% Asian, 0.0% Pacific Islander, 0.0% from other races and 2.1% from two or more races. Hispanic or Latino persons of any race comprised 1.6% of the population.

Of the 78 households, 34.6% of which had children under the age of 18 living with them, 50.0% were married couples living together, 14.1% were cohabitating couples, 20.5% had a female householder with no spouse or partner present and 15.4% had a male householder with no spouse or partner present. 34.6% of all households were non-families. 29.5% of all households were made up of individuals, 17.9% had someone living alone who was 65 years old or older.

The median age in the city was 37.5 years. 26.5% of the residents were under the age of 20; 4.8% were between the ages of 20 and 24; 24.3% were from 25 and 44; 21.7% were from 45 and 64; and 22.8% were 65 years of age or older. The gender makeup of the city was 50.3% male and 49.7% female.

=== 2010 census ===
As of the census of 2010, there were 168 people, 72 households, and 50 families residing in the city. The population density was 525.0 inhabitants per square mile (202.7/km^{2}). There were 85 housing units at an average density of 265.6 per square mile (102.5/km^{2}). The racial makeup of the city was 98.2% White, 0.6% African American, and 1.2% from two or more races. Hispanic or Latino of any race were 0.6% of the population.

There were 72 households, of which 30.6% had children under the age of 18 living with them, 58.3% were married couples living together, 5.6% had a female householder with no husband present, 5.6% had a male householder with no wife present, and 30.6% were non-families. 23.6% of all households were made up of individuals, and 5.6% had someone living alone who was 65 years of age or older. The average household size was 2.33 and the average family size was 2.78.

The median age in the city was 47.3 years. 20.2% of residents were under the age of 18; 7.9% were between the ages of 18 and 24; 17.4% were from 25 to 44; 36.8% were from 45 to 64; and 17.9% were 65 years of age or older. The gender makeup of the city was 49.4% male and 50.6% female.

=== 2000 census ===
As of the census of 2000, there were 209 people, 82 households, and 59 families residing in the city. The population density was 658.7 inhabitants per square mile (254.3/km^{2}). There were 88 housing units at an average density of 277.3 per square mile (107.1/km^{2}). The racial makeup of the city was 99.04% White, and 0.96% from two or more races.

There were 82 households, out of which 34.1% had children under the age of 18 living with them, 58.5% were married couples living together, 11.0% had a female householder with no husband present, and 28.0% were non-families. 23.2% of all households were made up of individuals, and 7.3% had someone living alone who was 65 years of age or older. The average household size was 2.55 and the average family size was 2.97.

28.2% are under the age of 18, 5.7% from 18 to 24, 24.4% from 25 to 44, 28.7% from 45 to 64, and 12.9% who were 65 years of age or older. The median age was 38 years. For every 100 females, there were 88.3 males. For every 100 females age 18 and over, there were 92.3 males.

The median income for a household in the city was $34,861, and the median income for a family was $36,500. Males had a median income of $27,273 versus $20,417 for females. The per capita income for the city was $13,925. About 7.6% of families and 14.3% of the population were below the poverty line, including 17.7% of those under the age of eighteen and 12.5% of those 65 or over.

== Education ==
Fremont–Mills Community School District operates public schools.

== Transportation ==
While there is no fixed-route transit service in Randolph, intercity bus service is provided by Jefferson Lines in nearby Shenandoah.

== Notable people ==
- Max Marshall, Cincinnati Reds outfielder
- Anson Rood, Wisconsin politician
- Virginia D. Smith, Congresswoman from Nebraska
