= Riverton, Iowa =

- City
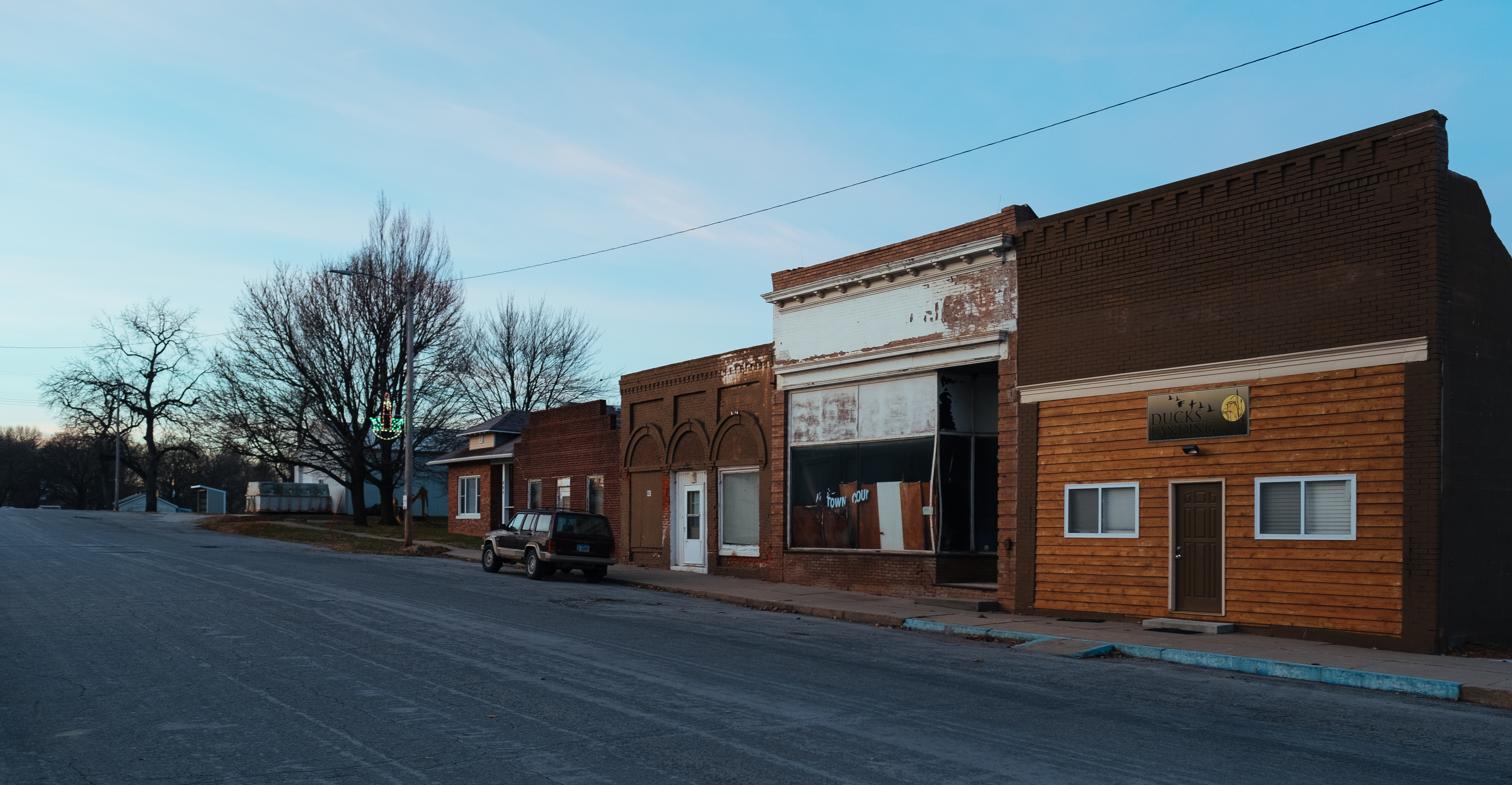
- Southbound Summer Avenue

- Location of Riverton, Iowa
- Coordinates: 40°41′13″N 95°34′07″W
- Country: USA
- State: Iowa
- County: Fremont

Area
  - Total: 0.60 sq mi (1.56 km^{2})
  - Land: 0.60 sq mi (1.56 km^{2})
  - Water: 0 sq mi (0.00 km^{2})
- Elevation: 968 ft (295 m)

Population (2020)
  - Total: 245
  - Density: 406.6/sq mi (156.98/km^{2})
- Time zone: UTC-6 (Central (CST))
  - Summer (DST): UTC-5 (CDT)
- ZIP code: 51650
- Area code: 712
- FIPS code: 19-67575
- GNIS feature ID: 2396387

Riverton is a city in Fremont County, Iowa, United States, along the East Nishnabotna River. The population was 245 at the time of the 2020 census.

== History ==
Riverton was laid out in 1870. The land on which the town was platted originally belonged to Coleman and Grazilla (Zimmerman) Smith. The Smith family went on to establish the first bank in Riverton.

The 1881 robbery of the Sexton Bank at Riverton was initially suspected to be the work of Jesse James, but it was soon correctly attributed to the outlaw Poke Wells.

== Geography ==
Riverton is located along the East Nishnabotna River.

According to the United States Census Bureau, the city has a total area of 0.59 square miles (1.53 km^{2}), all land.

== Demographics ==
Historical populations
Year	Pop.	±%
1880	497	—
1890	560	+12.7%
1900	687	+22.7%
1910	583	−15.1%
1920	568	−2.6%
1930	590	+3.9%
1940	543	−8.0%
1950	472	−13.1%
1960	399	−15.5%
1970	331	−17.0%
1980	342	+3.3%
1990	333	−2.6%
2000	304	−8.7%
2010	304	+0.0%
2020	245	−19.4%
Source:"U.S. Census website". United States Census Bureau. and Iowa Data Center; Source: U.S. Decennial Census

=== 2020 census ===
As of the census of 2020, there were 245 people, 119 households, and 73 families residing in the city. The population density was 406.6 inhabitants per square mile (157.0/km^{2}). There were 123 housing units at an average density of 204.1 per square mile (78.8/km^{2}). The racial makeup of the city was 96.3% White, 0.0% Black or African American, 0.0% Native American, 0.4% Asian, 0.0% Pacific Islander, 0.0% from other races and 3.3% from two or more races. Hispanic or Latino persons of any race comprised 1.6% of the population.

Of the 119 households, 23.5% of which had children under the age of 18 living with them, 45.4% were married couples living together, 10.9% were cohabitating couples, 21.0% had a female householder with no spouse or partner present and 22.7% had a male householder with no spouse or partner present. 38.7% of all households were non-families. 31.9% of all households were made up of individuals, 16.0% had someone living alone who was 65 years old or older.

The median age in the city was 51.3 years. 22.0% of the residents were under the age of 20; 2.9% were between the ages of 20 and 24; 19.6% were from 25 and 44; 32.2% were from 45 and 64; and 23.3% were 65 years of age or older. The gender makeup of the city was 50.6% male and 49.4% female.

=== 2010 census ===
As of the census of 2010, there were 304 people, 120 households, and 83 families residing in the city. The population density was 515.3 inhabitants per square mile (199.0/km^{2}). There were 131 housing units at an average density of 222.0 per square mile (85.7/km^{2}). The racial makeup of the city was 95.7% White, 0.7% African American, 0.7% Asian, 1.6% from other races, and 1.3% from two or more races. Hispanic or Latino of any race were 3.6% of the population.

There were 120 households, of which 32.5% had children under the age of 18 living with them, 54.2% were married couples living together, 10.0% had a female householder with no husband present, 5.0% had a male householder with no wife present, and 30.8% were non-families. 27.5% of all households were made up of individuals, and 10% had someone living alone who was 65 years of age or older. The average household size was 2.53 and the average family size was 3.08.

The median age in the city was 40.2 years. 26.6% of residents were under the age of 18; 4.6% were between the ages of 18 and 24; 24.3% were from 25 to 44; 27.7% were from 45 to 64; and 16.8% were 65 years of age or older. The gender makeup of the city was 51.6% male and 48.4% female.

=== 2000 census ===
As of the census of 2000, there were 304 people, 125 households, and 76 families residing in the city. The population density was 508.1 inhabitants per square mile (196.2/km^{2}). There were 144 housing units at an average density of 240.7 per square mile (92.9/km^{2}). The racial makeup of the city was 98.68% White, 0.33% Asian, and 0.99% from two or more races.

There were 125 households, out of which 26.4% had children under the age of 18 living with them, 49.6% were married couples living together, 7.2% had a female householder with no husband present, and 38.4% were non-families. 33.6% of all households were made up of individuals, and 14.4% had someone living alone who was 65 years of age or older. The average household size was 2.43 and the average family size was 3.13.

27.0% are under the age of 18, 8.9% from 18 to 24, 24.7% from 25 to 44, 22.7% from 45 to 64, and 16.8% who were 65 years of age or older. The median age was 38 years. For every 100 females, there were 114.1 males. For every 100 females age 18 and over, there were 105.6 males.

The median income for a household in the city was $27,500, and the median income for a family was $46,250. Males had a median income of $28,000 versus $21,250 for females. The per capita income for the city was $12,854. About 11.0% of families and 16.5% of the population were below the poverty line, including 12.9% of those under the age of eighteen and 20.5% of those 65 or over.

== Education ==
Riverton is within the Sidney Community School District.

Prior to 2016, Riverton was in the Farragut Community School District, which operated Nishnabotna High School. The Farragut district closed in 2016.

== Transportation ==
While there is no fixed-route transit service in Riverton, intercity bus service is provided by Jefferson Lines in nearby Shenandoah.
