= Percival, Iowa =

- Census-designated place
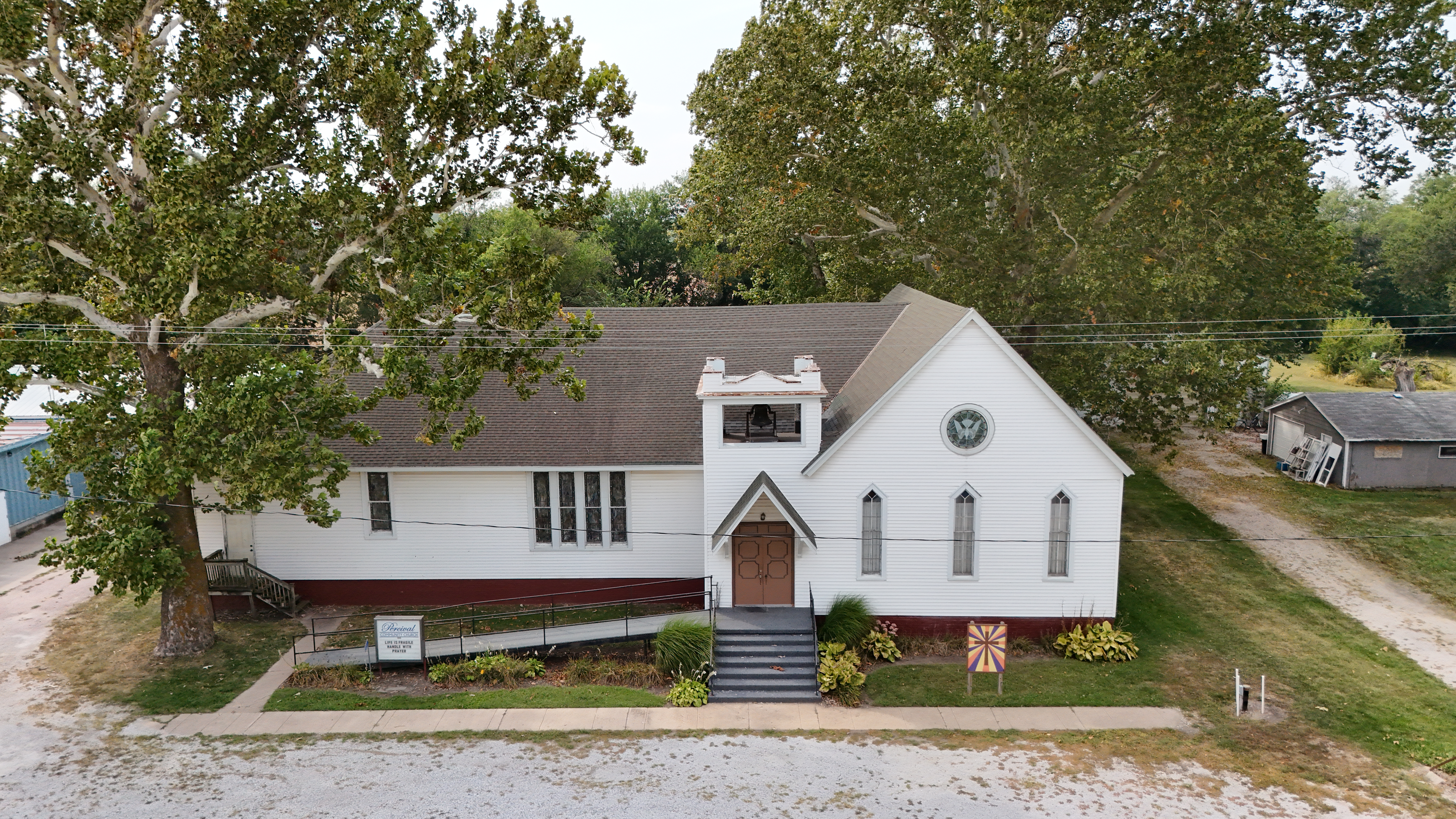
- Community Church

- Location in the state of Iowa
- Coordinates: 40°44′56″N 95°48′48″W
- Country: United States
- State: Iowa
- County: Fremont

Area
  - Total: 0.44 sq mi (1.14 km^{2})
  - Land: 0.44 sq mi (1.14 km^{2})
  - Water: 0 sq mi (0.00 km^{2})
- Elevation: 929 ft (283 m)

Population (2020)
  - Total: 53
  - Density: 120.5/sq mi (46.51/km^{2})
- Time zone: UTC-6 (Central (CST))
  - Summer (DST): UTC-5 (CDT)
- ZIP code: 51648
- FIPS code: 19-62175
- GNIS feature ID: 2583492

Percival is a small unincorporated community and census-designated place (CDP) in Fremont County, Iowa, United States. As of the 2020 census, it had a population of 53.

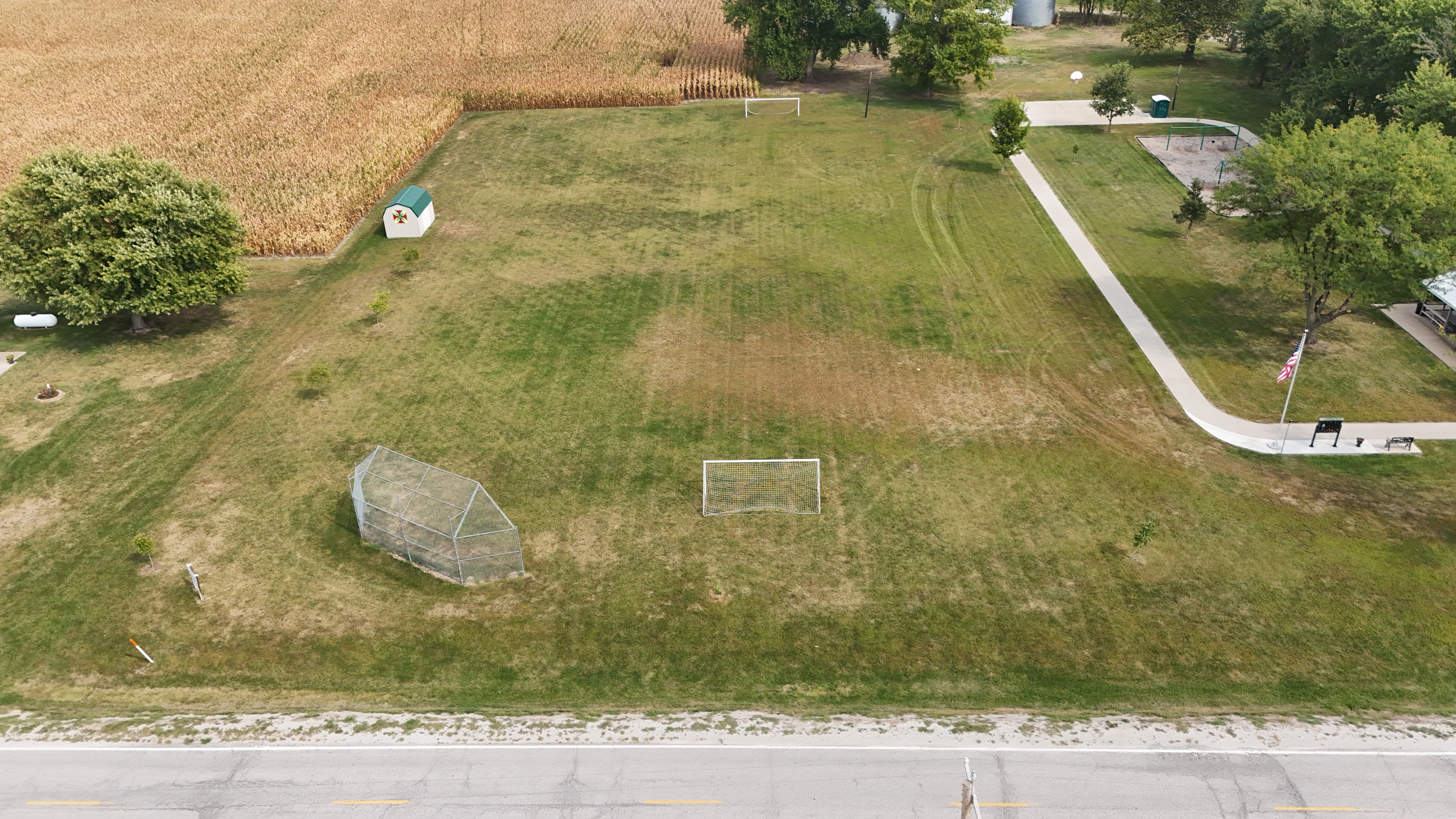
Percival Park

The old part of town is along the BNSF tracks and is accessible from Interstate 29 at Exit 15. However, most sources of employment are located near the Interstate 29/Iowa Highway 2 interchange at Exit 10 of Interstate 29. The ZIP code for Percival is 51648.

== Demographics ==
Historical population
Census	Pop.	Note	%±
2010	87		—
2020	53		−39.1%
U.S. Decennial Census

=== 2020 census ===
As of the census of 2020, there were 53 people, 25 households, and 17 families residing in the community. The population density was 120.5 inhabitants per square mile (46.5/km^{2}). There were 25 housing units at an average density of 56.8 per square mile (21.9/km^{2}). The racial makeup of the community was 84.9% White, 0.0% Black or African American, 1.9% Native American, 0.0% Asian, 0.0% Pacific Islander, 3.8% from other races and 9.4% from two or more races. Hispanic or Latino persons of any race comprised 7.5% of the population.

Of the 25 households, 36.0% of which had children under the age of 18 living with them, 56.0% were married couples living together, 12.0% were cohabitating couples, 12.0% had a female householder with no spouse or partner present and 20.0% had a male householder with no spouse or partner present. 32.0% of all households were non-families. 20.0% of all households were made up of individuals, 12.0% had someone living alone who was 65 years old or older.

The median age in the community was 50.3 years. 20.8% of the residents were under the age of 20; 1.9% were between the ages of 20 and 24; 22.6% were from 25 and 44; 39.6% were from 45 and 64; and 15.1% were 65 years of age or older. The gender makeup of the community was 41.5% male and 58.5% female.

== Education ==
It is in the Sidney Community School District.
