= Shenandoah Community School District =

Public school district in Shenandoah, Iowa, United States

Location
- Shenandoah, Iowa Fremont, Page, Mills, and Montgomery counties United States
- Coordinates: 40°45′24″N 95°22′09″W

District information
- Type: Local school district
- Grades: K-12
- Superintendent: Dr. Kerri Nelson
- Schools: 4
- Budget: $16,493,000 (2020-21)
- NCES District ID: 1926070

Students and staff
- Students: 1078 (2022-23)
- Teachers: 77.19 FTE
- Staff: 104.56 FTE
- Student–teacher ratio: 13.97
- Athletic conference: Hawkeye 10
- District mascot: Mustangs & Fillies
- Colors: Maroon and White

Other information
- Website: www.shencsd.com

Shenandoah Community School District is a school district headquartered in Shenandoah, Iowa. It operates Shenandoah Elementary School, Shenandoah Middle School, and Shenandoah High School.

Its boundaries include Shenandoah, Imogene, and Northboro, as well as almost all of Farragut. It is mostly in Fremont and Page counties with small portions in Mills and Montgomery counties.

The district took control of the school buildings of the Farragut Community School District, which closed in 2016. Most of the Farragut district east of M-16, including Farragut and Imogene, was assigned to Shenandoah CSD.

The school's mascot are the Mustangs & Fillies. Their colors are maroon and white.

It is one of several school districts that accepts high school students from the K-8 Hamburg Community School District of Hamburg.

== Schools ==
The district operates four schools, all in Shenandoah:

- Logan Preschool
- Shenandoah Elementary School
- Shenandoah Middle School
- Shenandoah High School

=== Shenandoah High School ===
==== Athletics ====
The Mustangs & Fillies compete in the Hawkeye 10 Conference in the following sports:

===== Fall Sports =====
- Cross Country (boys and girls)
  - Boys' - 5-time State Champions (1974, 1975, 1988, 1989, 1991)
- Football
- Volleyball

===== Winter Sports =====
- Basketball (boys and girls)
- Bowling
  - Boys' 2022 Class 1A State Champions
- Wrestling (boys and girls)

===== Spring Sports =====
- Golf (boys and girls)
- Soccer (boys and girls)
- Tennis (boys and girls)
- Track and Field (boys and girls)

===== Summer Sports =====
- Baseball
- Softball

== See also ==
- List of school districts in Iowa
- List of high schools in Iowa
