= Iowa Highway 333 =

Highway in Iowa, U.S.

Iowa Highway 333
- Iowa 333 highlighted in red

Route information
- Maintained by Iowa DOT
- Length: 1.558 mi (2.507 km)
- Existed: 1935–present

Major junctions
- West end: I-29 / CR J64 near Hamburg
- East end: US 275 at Hamburg

Location
- Country: United States
- State: Iowa
- Counties: Fremont

Highway system
- Iowa Primary Highway System; Interstate; US; State; Secondary; Scenic
| ← Iowa 330 | → Iowa 346 |

Iowa Highway 333 (Iowa 333) is a short highway in southwestern Iowa. It serves as a connector route between Interstate 29 (I-29) and U.S. Highway 275 (US 275) in Hamburg. Formerly spanning two counties, Iowa 333 is one of the shortest state highways in Iowa.

== Route description ==
Iowa 333 begins at exit 1 along I-29, approximately two miles (3.2 km) north of the Missouri state line. Just 500 yards (460 m) from the western end, the highway crosses a BNSF Railway line. It enters Hamburg's west side along North Street. Iowa 333 intersects Main Street at a four-way stop; Main Street connects to Route V in Atchison County, Missouri, one mile (1.6 km) south of town. Two blocks east of Main Street, the route turns north onto Washington Street towards US 275. Iowa 333 passes Hamburg's Clayton Field between A and D Streets before ending at E Street. Northbound US 275 continues north on Washington Street and southbound US 275 travels east on E Street.

== History ==
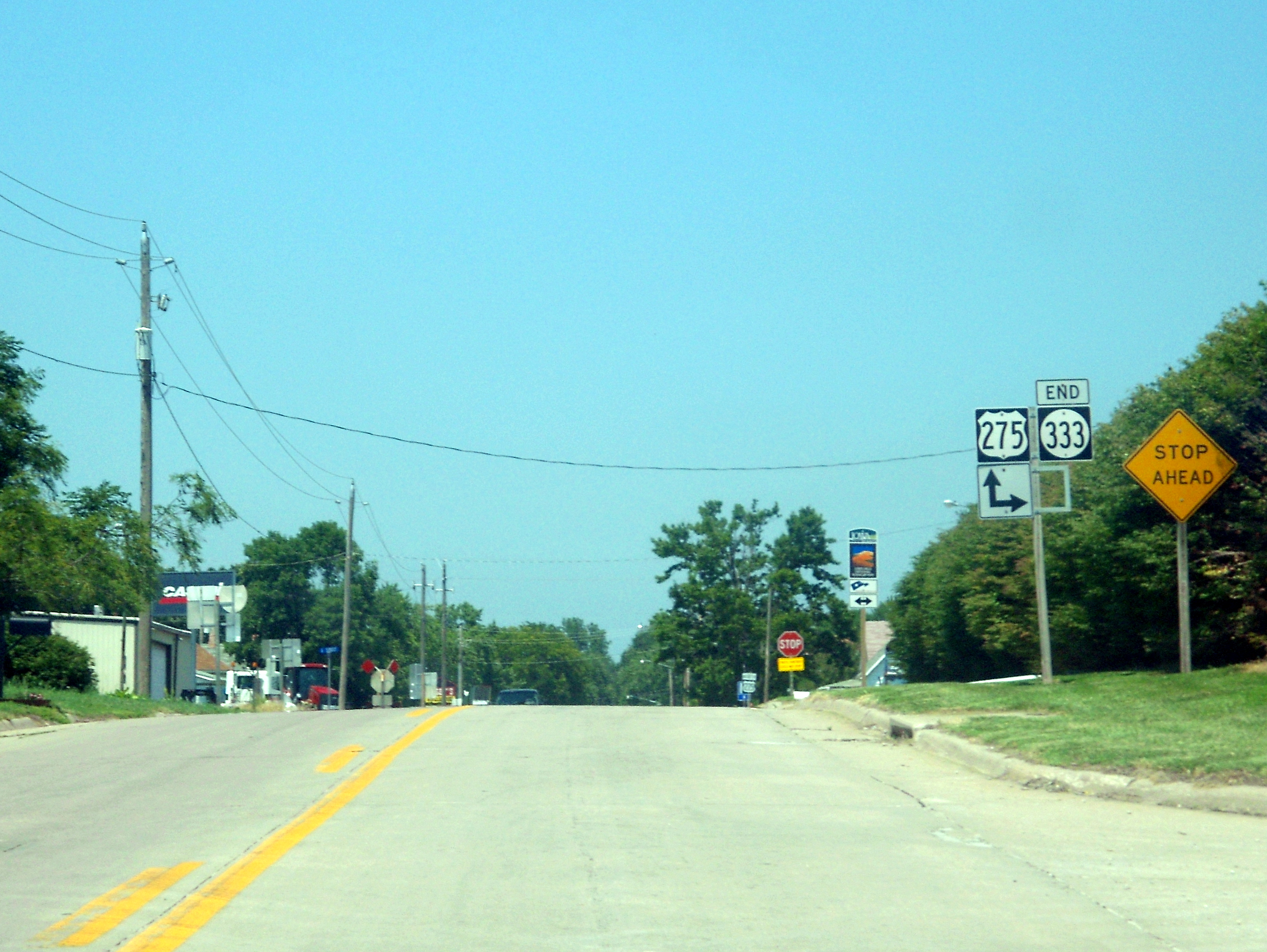
Iowa 333 eastern terminus at US 275 in Hamburg.

Iowa 333 was designated in 1935 as a six-mile-long (9.7 km) spur route from US 59 to Northboro. By the end of 1936, the route had been extended east through College Springs and ended at US 71. It absorbed Iowa 84, which ran from US 71 into College Springs. The former Iowa 333 spur into Northboro was redesignated Iowa 343. A few years later, Iowa 333 was extended westward to end at US 275 in Hamburg. This westward extension was reverted in 1964. In 1966, the turn into College Springs was removed from Iowa 333 and became the unsigned Iowa 999. The straightened route still ended at US 71, but now only one mile (1.6 km) north of Braddyville and the Missouri state line.

For four days in December 1980, Iowa 333 consisted of only one mile (1.6 km) of road in Fremont County. On December 15, 1980, the Iowa Department of Transportation (Iowa DOT) relinquished control of the highway to Page County from the Fremont–Page county line east to US 71. Four days later, the Iowa DOT took control of County Road J64 from I-29 west of Hamburg to US 59 and included a brief overlap with US 275; this was mostly the same section of road that had previously been a part of Iowa 333 from the late 1930s to the mid 1960s. The mile-long section of highway east of US 59 was turned over to Fremont County in 1987.

In 2002, the Road Use Tax Fund Committee, a mix of city, county, and state transportation officials, met to review and recommend changes to Iowa's public road system. The report was necessitated by increasing costs to maintain the highway system and a level of funding that was not keeping up with the rising costs. The committee identified over 700 miles (1,100 km) of state highways, including a significant portion of Iowa 333, which could be turned over to local jurisdictions. Most of the committee's recommendations were accepted and on July 1, 2003, and over 600 miles (970 km) of state highways were turned over to the counties or local jurisdictions. Iowa 333 east of the eastern junction with US 275 was given back to Fremont County and became CR J64 once again.

== Major intersections ==
The entire route is in Hamburg, Fremont County.

| mi | km | Destinations | Notes |
|---|---|---|---|
| 0.000 | 0.000 | I-29 (Exit 1) / CR J64 (310th Street) | |
| 1.558 | 2.507 | US 275 north (Washington Street) / US 275 south (E Street) | |
1.000 mi = 1.609 km; 1.000 km = 0.621 mi
