= Fremont–Mills Community School District =

Public school district in Tabor, Iowa, United States

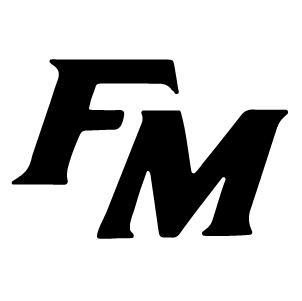

Location
- Tabor, Iowa Fremont and Mills counties United States
- Coordinates: 40°53′06″N 95°40′11″W

District information
- Type: Local school district
- Grades: K–12
- Superintendent: David Gute
- Schools: 2
- Budget: $7,541,000 (2020-21)
- NCES District ID: 1912120

Students and staff
- Students: 469 (2022-23)
- Teachers: 35.70 FTE
- Staff: 45.60 FTE
- Student–teacher ratio: 13.14
- Athletic conference: Corner Conference
- District mascot: Knights
- Colors: Black and Gold

Other information
- Website: www.fremontmills.org

Fremont–Mills Community School District is a rural public school district headquartered in Tabor, Iowa, serving sections of Fremont and Mills counties.

Communities in its service area are Tabor, Randolph, and Thurman. It also includes the Bartlett census-designated place.

It took portions of the former Farragut Community School District when the State of Iowa dissolved it on July 1, 2016.

It is one of several school districts that accepts high school students from the K-8 Hamburg Community School District of Hamburg.

== Schools ==
The district operates two schools on one campus in Tabor:

- Fremont–Mills Elementary School
- Fremont–Mills Middle and Senior High School

=== Fremont–Mills High School ===
==== Athletics ====
The Knights compete in the Corner Conference in the following sports:

- Cross country (boys and girls)
- Volleyball
- Football
- Basketball (boys and girls)
- Wrestling
- Track and field (boys and girls)
- Golf (boys and girls)
- Baseball
- Softball

== See also ==
- List of school districts in Iowa
- List of high schools in Iowa
