= Thurman, Iowa =

- City
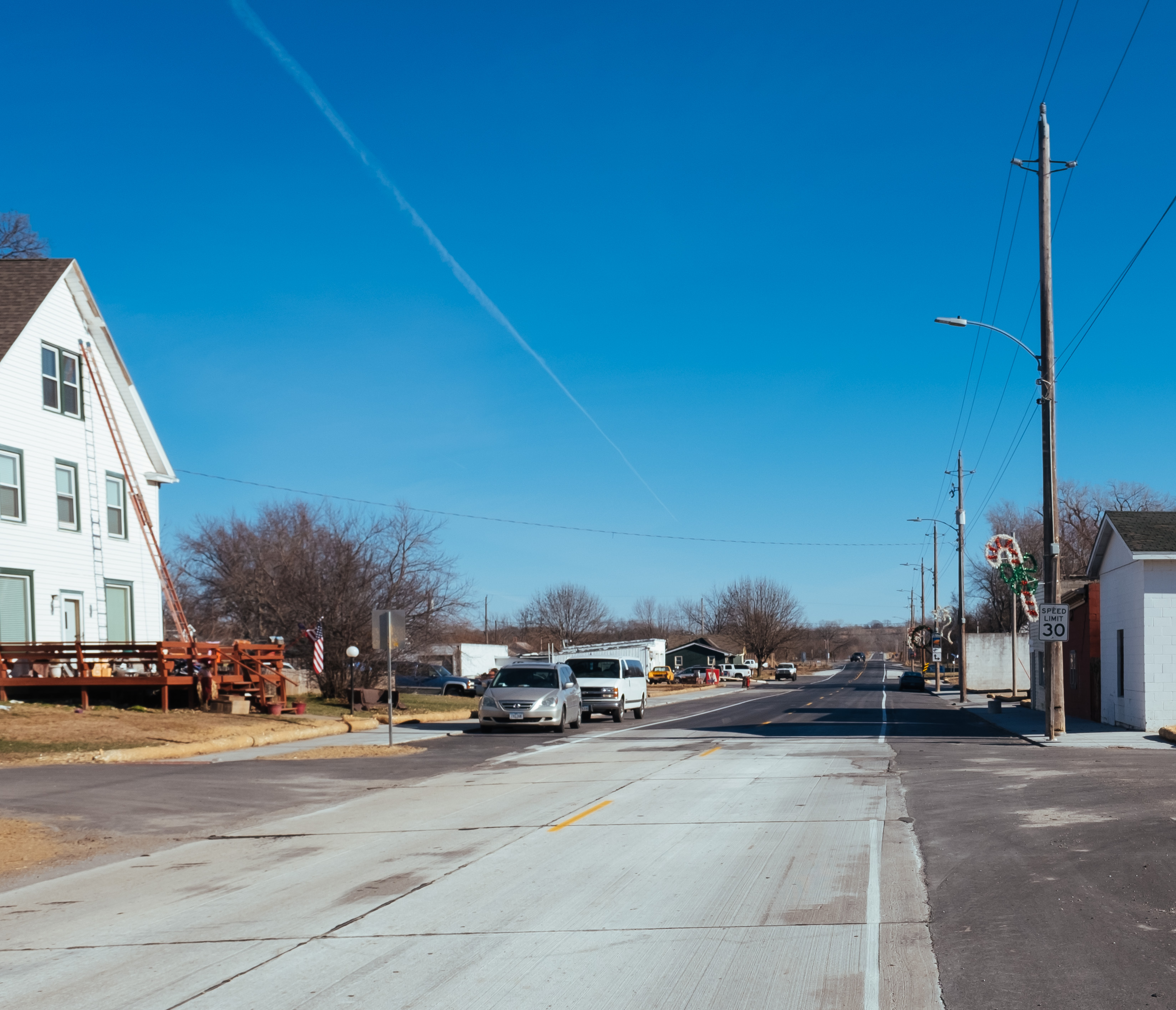
- Filmore Street

- Location of Thurman, Iowa
- Coordinates: 40°49′12″N 95°45′04″W
- Country: USA
- State: Iowa
- County: Fremont

Area
  - Total: 0.56 sq mi (1.46 km^{2})
  - Land: 0.56 sq mi (1.46 km^{2})
  - Water: 0 sq mi (0.00 km^{2})
- Elevation: 978 ft (298 m)

Population (2020)
  - Total: 167
  - Density: 296/sq mi (114.2/km^{2})
- Time zone: UTC-6 (Central (CST))
  - Summer (DST): UTC-5 (CDT)
- ZIP code: 51654
- Area code: 712
- FIPS code: 19-77970
- GNIS feature ID: 2397022

Thurman is a city in Fremont County, Iowa. As of the 2020 census, the city population was 167.

== History ==
On April 14, 2012, a half-mile wide EF-2 tornado struck Thurman. The storm damaged 75 to 90 percent of its homes. Five tractor-trailers traveling on Interstate 29 were flipped before the tornado hit Thurman. One driver suffered a perforated lung and was taken to a hospital.

== Geography ==
According to the United States Census Bureau, the city has a total area of 0.56 square miles (1.45 km^{2}), all land.

== Demographics ==
Historical populations
Year	Pop.	±%
1880	378	—
1890	395	+4.5%
1900	409	+3.5%
1910	336	−17.8%
1920	341	+1.5%
1930	388	+13.8%
1940	325	−16.2%
1950	284	−12.6%
1960	268	−5.6%
1970	230	−14.2%
1980	221	−3.9%
1990	239	+8.1%
2000	236	−1.3%
2010	229	−3.0%
2020	167	−27.1%
Source:"U.S. Census website". United States Census Bureau. and Iowa Data Center; Source: U.S. Decennial Census

=== 2020 census ===
As of the census of 2020, there were 167 people, 67 households, and 45 families residing in the city. The population density was 295.8 inhabitants per square mile (114.2/km^{2}). There were 74 housing units at an average density of 131.1 per square mile (50.6/km^{2}). The racial makeup of the city was 86.2% White, 0.0% Black or African American, 1.8% Native American, 0.0% Asian, 0.6% Pacific Islander, 0.0% from other races and 11.4% from two or more races. Hispanic or Latino persons of any race comprised 3.0% of the population.

Of the 67 households, 29.9% of which had children under the age of 18 living with them, 38.8% were married couples living together, 14.9% were cohabitating couples, 19.4% had a female householder with no spouse or partner present and 26.9% had a male householder with no spouse or partner present. 32.8% of all households were non-families. 19.4% of all households were made up of individuals, 9.0% had someone living alone who was 65 years old or older.

The median age in the city was 41.8 years. 24.6% of the residents were under the age of 20; 6.0% were between the ages of 20 and 24; 25.7% were from 25 and 44; 31.7% were from 45 and 64; and 12.0% were 65 years of age or older. The gender makeup of the city was 52.1% male and 47.9% female.

=== 2010 census ===
As of the census of 2010, there were 229 people, 80 households, and 60 families living in the city. The population density was 408.9 inhabitants per square mile (157.9/km^{2}). There were 91 housing units at an average density of 162.5 per square mile (62.7/km^{2}). The racial makeup of the city was 97.4% White, 0.4% African American, and 2.2% Native American. Hispanic or Latino of any race were 1.7% of the population.

There were 80 households, of which 43.8% had children under the age of 18 living with them, 58.8% were married couples living together, 12.5% had a female householder with no husband present, 3.8% had a male householder with no wife present, and 25.0% were non-families. 16.3% of all households were made up of individuals, and 3.8% had someone living alone who was 65 years of age or older. The average household size was 2.86 and the average family size was 3.28.

The median age in the city was 34.2 years. 33.2% of residents were under the age of 18; 5.2% were between the ages of 18 and 24; 25.7% were from 25 to 44; 27.1% were from 45 to 64; and 8.7% were 65 years of age or older. The gender makeup of the city was 48.9% male and 51.1% female.

=== 2000 census ===
As of the census of 2000, there were 236 people, 81 households, and 60 families living in the city. The population density was 424.1 inhabitants per square mile (163.7/km^{2}). There were 90 housing units at an average density of 161.7 per square mile (62.4/km^{2}). The racial makeup of the city was 99.15% White, 0.42% Native American, 0.42% from other races. Hispanic or Latino of any race were 1.69% of the population.

There were 81 households, out of which 39.5% had children under the age of 18 living with them, 63.0% were married couples living together, 8.6% had a female householder with no husband present, and 25.9% were non-families. 18.5% of all households were made up of individuals, and 6.2% had someone living alone who was 65 years of age or older. The average household size was 2.91 and the average family size was 3.38.

33.5% are under the age of 18, 5.1% from 18 to 24, 28.4% from 25 to 44, 22.5% from 45 to 64, and 10.6% who were 65 years of age or older. The median age was 35 years. For every 100 females, there were 93.4 males. For every 100 females age 18 and over, there were 101.3 males.

The median income for a household in the city was $34,583, and the median income for a family was $38,438. Males had a median income of $26,667 versus $26,250 for females. The per capita income for the city was $13,851. About 7.0% of families and 16.4% of the population were below the poverty line, including 17.8% of those under the age of eighteen and 52.6% of those 65 or over.

== Education ==
Fremont–Mills Community School District operates public schools.
