= Sidney Community School District =

Public school district in Sidney, Iowa, United States

Location
- Sidney, Iowa Fremont County United States
- Coordinates: 40°44′33″N 95°39′38″W

District information
- Type: Local school district
- Grades: K-12
- Superintendent: Tim Hood
- Schools: 3
- Budget: $7,992,000 (2020-21)
- NCES District ID: 1926250

Students and staff
- Students: 512 (2022-23)
- Teachers: 36.56 FTE
- Staff: 45.39 FTE
- Student–teacher ratio: 14.00
- Athletic conference: Corner Conference
- District mascot: Cowboys & Cowgirls
- Colors: Red and White

Other information
- Website: www.sidneyschools.org

Sidney Community School District, or Sidney Community Schools, is a public school district headquartered in Sidney, Iowa. It serves Sidney and Riverton, as well as a small part of Farragut. The district also includes the census-designated places of Anderson and Percival.

It operates Sidney Elementary School and Sidney Junior-Senior High School.

As of 2015, the district had 455 students, including 140 senior high school students.

The Farragut Community School District was dissolved effective July 1, 2016. Most of the Farragut district west of County Road M-16, including Riverton, was assigned to Sidney CSD.

It is one of several school districts that accepts high school students from the K-8 Hamburg Community School District of Hamburg.

== Schools ==
The district operates two schools on two campuses in Sidney, and a Virtual SAC School:

- Sidney Elementary School
- Sidney High School

=== Sidney High School ===
==== Athletics ====
The Cowboys & Cowgirls compete in the Corner Conference in the following sports:

- Cross Country (boys and girls)
- Volleyball
  - 2019 State Champions
- Football
- Basketball (boys and girls)
- Wrestling
- Track and Field (boys and girls)
  - 1984 State Champions (boys)
- Golf (boys and girls)
- Baseball
- Softball

== See also ==
- List of school districts in Iowa
- List of high schools in Iowa
