= Farragut Community School District =

Former school district in Iowa, U.S.

Farragut Community School District was a school district headquartered in Farragut, Iowa. Its territory included the communities of Farragut, Imogene, and Riverton. The district, from 2011 to 2016, also served secondary school students residing in Hamburg. The state of Iowa forced the district to close effective 2016.

== History ==
Circa 1997 it had about 380 students.

By the 2010s the district began to have budget issues. It agreed to a grade-sharing arrangement with the Hamburg Community School District. The elementary schools in both districts were initially to be run independently; middle school students were to attend Hamburg, and high school students were to attend Farragut. Nishnabotna High School in Farragut became the community high school for both Farragut and Hamburg, replacing the former Farragut High in 2011.

By March 2015 the districts agreed to change their grade sharing arrangement in which all elementary school students went to school in Hamburg while all secondary students went to Farragut. Farragut and Hamburg attempted to voluntarily consolidate with one another. Voters in the Farragut district approved the consolidation, but voters in Hamburg turned it down, with seven more votes against rather than for. The Hamburg voters wished to retain their middle school. Hamburg voted against on a 271–264 basis, while Farragut residents had approved on a 371–32 basis. Terry Kenealy, the superintendent of the Hamburg district, stated that there was a sentiment against Farragut in the Hamburg community. Tom Hinrichs, the superintendent of the Farragut district, cited disputes over the school grade configurations. The districts decided to continue grade sharing, with Hamburg having elementary grades and Farragut having secondary grades.

=== Closure ===
Iowa state education authorities, by 2015, had repeatedly cited the Farragut district for noncompliance with state operating standards. In the fiscal year of 2015 the district had a deficit of almost $93,000. Its enrollment was decreasing at the time; it had 186 students in 2015.

In October 2015 the Iowa Department of Education recommended that the Farragut district be abolished. The Iowa Board of Education voted to close the district, making it the third such district in the state that the board closed. The accreditation was revoked as part of the vote on November 18, 2015. Superintendent Tom Hinrichs resigned in December 2015 after the state board ended local rule at Farragut CSD.

The closure was scheduled for July 1, 2016. The Hamburg district became a PreK–8 district and paid other school districts to take its high school students. The Shenandoah district took control of the school buildings.

The Iowa Department of Education revised the boundaries of the remaining school districts. Most of the Farragut district west of County Road M-16, including Riverton, was assigned to the Sidney Community School District, while most of the Farragut district east of M-16, including Farragut and Imogene, was assigned to the Shenandoah Community School District. The Fremont–Mills and Hamburg districts also took portions of former Farragut district territory. According to the deputy director of the Iowa Department of Education at the time, Jeff Berger, the department looked at travel possibilities and existing open enrollment patterns, along with "as much common sense as we could", in deciding which areas of the former Farragut district went to other districts; Berger added that the department, in regards to the shapes of the new district territories, "tried to keep clean lines."

== See also ==
School districts forced by the Iowa Board of Education to merge

- Hedrick Community School District
- Russell Community School District
