= Hamburg Community School District =

School district in Iowa, United States

Location
- Hamburg, Iowa Fremont County United States
- Coordinates: 40°36′57″N 95°39′10″W

District information
- Type: Local school district
- Grades: PK–12 (PK–8 2011-2015 and 2016-2023 PK-6 in 2015-2016)
- Superintendent: Alec Hendrickson
- Schools: 2
- Budget: $4,011,000 (2020-21)
- NCES District ID: 1913440

Students and staff
- Students: 174 (2022-23)
- Teachers: 13.57 FTE
- Staff: 27.78 FTE
- Student–teacher ratio: 12.82
- District mascot: Wildcats
- Colors: Blue and white

Other information
- Website: www.hamburgcsd.org

Hamburg Community School District (HCSD) is a school district headquartered in Hamburg, Iowa.

Its schools are Marnie Simons Elementary School, which was known for a period as Nishnabotna Elementary School, serving preschool through fifth grade, and Hamburg Middle School, serving grades 6–8. The District also operates Hamburg Charter High School for grades 9-12. Students wishing for a more traditional high school education may attend classes at Shenandoah through a tuition agreement, or Sidney via open enrollment. Plans are currently being made to restructure the district to operate a Pk-6 elementary school and a 7-12 Charter High School

== History ==
The Hamburg school opened in 1924.

By the 2010s, the Hamburg district agreed to a grade-sharing arrangement with the Farragut Community School District, which was facing financial issues. In 2011 Hamburg high school closed. Nishnabotna High School in Farragut became the community high school for both Farragut and Hamburg. Initially both districts were to operate their own elementary schools; middle school students were to attend Hamburg while high school students were to go to Farragut. By March 2015, the districts agreed to change their grade sharing arrangement in which all elementary school students went to school in Hamburg while all secondary students went to Farragut. Farragut and Hamburg attempted to voluntarily consolidate with one another.

Prior to early 2014, the Hamburg school district shared a superintendent, Jay Lutt, with the Farragut school district. On February 3, 2014, the Hamburg school board voted to stop using the Farragut superintendent with three board members voting to stop, Steve Senzel voting to keep using the Farragut superintendent, and Susan Harris abstaining from this vote.

By mid-2014, the leaderships of both districts were trying to consolidate both districts into a Nishnabotna Community School District as both districts continued to face financial difficulty. By the end of June that year, the projected budget shortfall for Hamburg was $299,948.17. Voters in the Farragut district approved the consolidation, but voters in Hamburg turned it down, with seven more votes against rather than for. The Hamburg voters wished to retain their middle school. Terry Kenealy, the superintendent of the Hamburg district, stated that there was a sentiment against Farragut in the Hamburg community. Tom Hinrichs, the superintendent of the Farragut district, cited disputes over the school grade configurations. The districts decided to continue grade sharing, with Hamburg having elementary grades and Farragut having secondary grades.

The State of Iowa forced the Farragut district to close, effective July 1, 2016. The Hamburg district, which took territory from the former Farragut district, became a PreK–8 district and paid other school districts to take its high school students.

In 2017, the district sold its former high school building for $30,000.

In 2023, a charter high school was scheduled to open.

== See also ==
- Non-high school district
