= National Register of Historic Places listings in Atchison County, Missouri =

Location of Atchison County in Missouri

This is a list of the National Register of Historic Places listings in Atchison County, Missouri.

This is intended to be a complete list of the properties and districts on the National Register of Historic Places in Atchison County, Missouri, United States. Latitude and longitude coordinates are provided for many National Register properties and districts; these locations may be seen together in a map.

There are 8 properties and districts listed on the National Register in the county. Another property was once listed but has been removed.

This National Park Service list is complete through NPS recent listings posted March 14, 2025.

== Current listings ==
	Name on the Register	Image	Date listed	Location	City or town	Description
1	Atchison County Memorial Building	Atchison County Memorial Building	December 22, 1987 (#87001578)	417 S. Main St. 40°24′40″N 95°30′51″W	Rock Port	
2	Brownville Bridge	Brownville Bridge	June 17, 1993 (#93000536)	U.S. Route 136 over the Missouri River; 40°23′57″N 95°39′06″W	Phelps City	Extends into Nemaha County, Nebraska
3	John Dickinson Dopf Mansion	John Dickinson Dopf Mansion	February 8, 1984 (#84003858)	407 Cass St. 40°24′43″N 95°31′07″W	Rock Port	
4	Gibbs Site		February 23, 1972 (#72000703)	Address Restricted	Watson	
5	Rankin Hall	Rankin Hall	February 17, 2010 (#10000022)	402 N. 13th St. 40°26′35″N 95°23′32″W	Tarkio	Tarkio College administration building built in 1931
6	St. Oswald's Protestant Episcopal Church	St. Oswald's Protestant Episcopal Church	January 13, 1992 (#91001959)	MO EE S of jct. with Missouri Route 46; 40°16′39″N 95°14′12″W	Skidmore	
7	Thompson-Campbell Farmstead	Thompson-Campbell Farmstead	October 18, 2003 (#03001056)	25579 MO U 40°21′30″N 95°34′51″W	Langdon	
8	Walnut Inn	Walnut Inn	April 12, 1982 (#82003124)	224 Main St. 40°26′27″N 95°22′41″W	Tarkio	

== Former listing ==
	Name on the Register	Image	Date listed	Date removed	Location	City or town	Description
1	Mule Barn Theatre		October 15, 1970 (#70000321)	December 19, 1994	10th and Park Streets	Tarkio	Destroyed in a 1989 fire.

== See also ==
- List of National Historic Landmarks in Missouri
- National Register of Historic Places listings in Missouri
