= St. Oswald's Church =

St Oswald's Church may refer to any of a number of churches, mainly in the north of England:

== Australia ==
- St Oswald's Church, Haberfield, (connected to St. John the Baptist's Anglican Church)
- The former St Oswald's Church, Broken Head
- The former St Oswald's Church, Coledale
- St Oswald's Church, Glen Iris
- St Oswald's Church, Parkside

== Malta ==
- St Oswald's Church, Mtarfa

== England ==
=== Cheshire/Wirral ===
- St Oswald's Church, Backford
- St Oswald's Church, Bidston, Wirral
- St Oswald's Church, Bollington
- St Oswald's Church, Brereton
- St Oswald's Church, Lower Peover
- St Oswald's Church, Malpas
- St Oswald's Church, Padgate, Warrington
- St Oswald's Church, Winwick
- St Oswald's Church, Worleston

=== Cumbria ===
- St Oswald's Church, Burneside
- St Oswald's Church, Dean
- St Oswald's Church, Kirkoswald, Cumbria
- St Oswald's Church, Grasmere
- St Oswald's Church, Ravenstonedale

St Oswald’ church, Collingham, Wetherby

=== Derbyshire ===
- St Oswald's Church, Ashbourne

=== County Durham ===
- St Oswald's Church, a Grade II* listed church in Durham

=== Gloucestershire ===
- St Oswald's Church, Gloucester
- St Oswald's Church, Lassington

=== Hertfordshire ===
- St Oswald's Church, Croxley Green

=== Lancashire/Merseyside ===
- St Oswald's Church, Old Swan, Liverpool, Merseyside
- St Oswald's Church, Preesall, Lancashire
- St Oswald's Church, Warton, Lancashire

=== Nottinghamshire ===
- St Oswald's Church, East Stoke

=== West Midlands ===
- St Oswald's Church, Small Heath

=== Yorkshire ===
- St Oswald's Church, Askrigg, North Yorkshire
- St Oswald's Church, Castle Bolton, North Yorkshire
- Church of St Oswald, Filey, North Yorkshire
- St Oswald's Church, Fulford, North Yorkshire
- St Oswald's Church, Guiseley, West Yorkshire
- St Oswald's Church, Kirk Sandall, Doncaster, South Yorkshire
- Church of St Oswald, Lythe, North Yorkshire
- St Oswald’s Church, Oswaldkirk, North Yorkshire
- St Oswald's Church, Sowerby, North Yorkshire
- St Oswald's Church, Thornton in Lonsdale, North Yorkshire
- Church of St Oswald, Thornton Steward, North Yorkshire

=== Shropshire ===
- St Oswald's Church, Oswestry

== United States ==
- St. Oswald's Protestant Episcopal Church, listed on the National Register of Historic Places in Atchison County, Missouri
