= St Oswald's Vicarage =

St Oswald's Vicarage may refer to:

- St Oswald's Vicarage, Chester, Cheshire, England
- St Oswald's Vicarage, Warton, Lancashire, England

== See also ==
- St. Oswalds Church, listing churches many of which will have an associated vicarage
