= Clay Township, Atchison County, Missouri =

Township in Atchison County, Missouri, U.S.

Clay Township
- Township
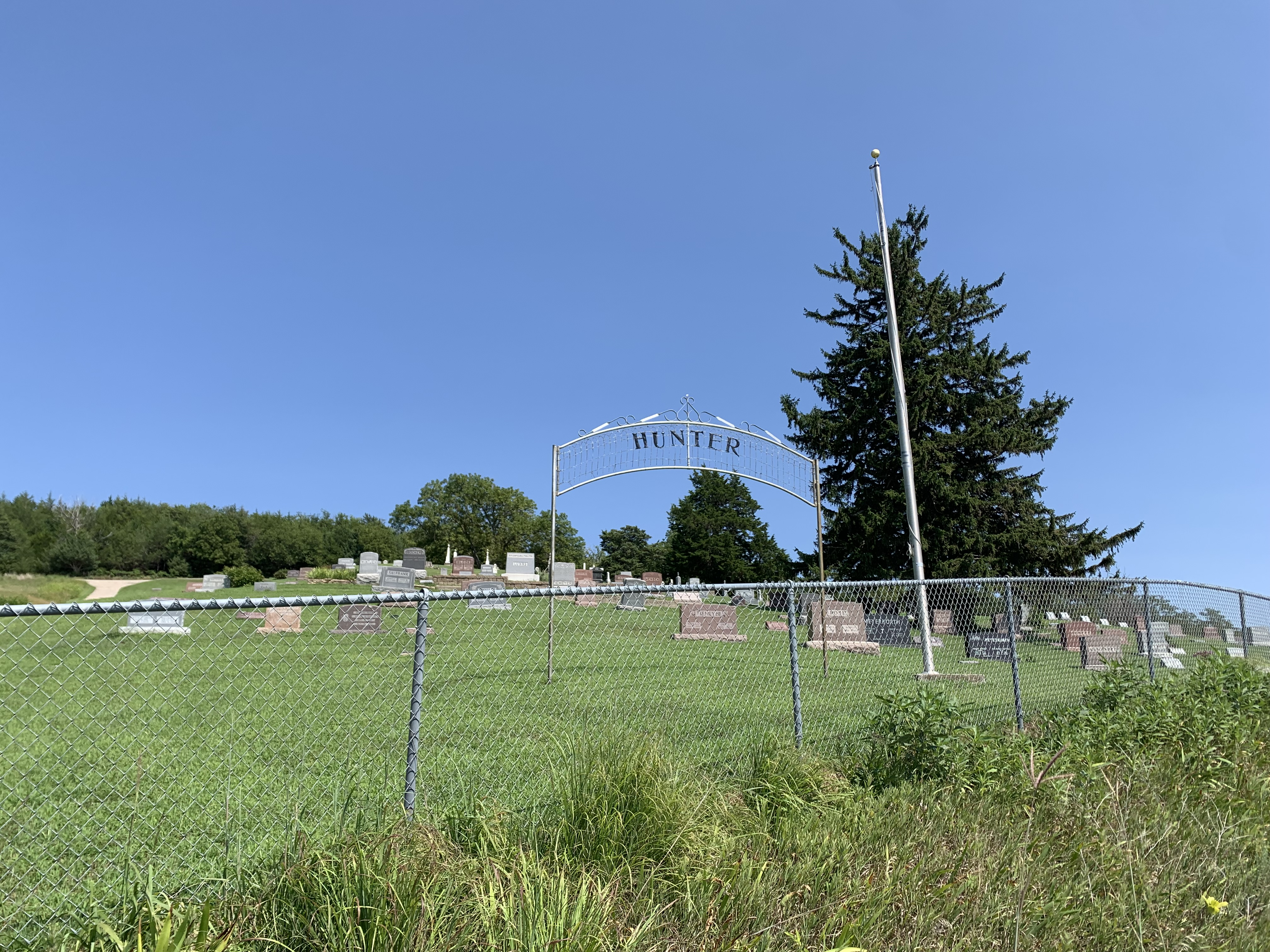
- Hunter Cemetery in southern Clay Township

- Coordinates: 40°23′21″N 95°31′44″W
- Country: United States
- State: Missouri
- County: Atchison

Area
  - Total: 42.03 sq mi (108.9 km^{2})
  - Land: 42.01 sq mi (108.8 km^{2})
  - Water: 0.02 sq mi (0.052 km^{2}) 0.05%
- Elevation: 984 ft (300 m)

Population (2020)
  - Total: 1,710
  - Density: 40.7/sq mi (15.7/km^{2})
- FIPS code: 29-00514284
- GNIS feature ID: 766233

Clay Township is a township in Atchison County, Missouri, United States. At the 2020 census, its population was 1710.

== History ==
Clay Township was organized on February 20, 1856 after being split from Clark Township and Polk Township. It was named after Henry Clay of Kentucky. The first mill in Atchison County was built in 1842 on Rock Creek in this township.

== Geography ==
Clay Township covers an area of 42.03 square miles (108.9 km^{2}) and contains one incorporated settlement, Rock Port (the county seat). It contains seven cemeteries: Bush, County Home, Elmwood, Greenhill, Hunter, Millsap, and Smith.

The largest stream in the township is Rock Creek, and a few smaller streams flow through as well: Boney Branch, Turkey Creek, and Volger Branch.

The former settlement of Union City was located in the center-west of the township on the foot of the Loess Bluffs three-miles east of Phelps City.

== Transportation ==
Clay Township contains one airport, Luhrs Landing Strip.

=== Major highways ===
The following highways travel through the township:

- Interstate 29
- U.S. Route 136
- U.S. Route 275
- Route 111
- Route E
- Route J
- Route KK
- Route Y
