= Volger Branch =

Stream in Missouri, U.S.

Location
- Country: United States
- State: Missouri
- County: Atchison County, Missouri

Physical characteristics
- Source
  - location: Clay Township
  - coordinates: 40°25′15″N 95°27′56″W
  - elevation: 1,080 ft (330 m)
- Mouth: Rock Creek
  - location: Clay Township
  - coordinates: 40°23′45″N 95°30′36″W
  - elevation: 912 ft (278 m)

Basin features
- Progression: Volger Branch → Rock Creek → Missouri River → Mississippi River → Atlantic Ocean

Volger Branch is a stream in Atchison County in the U.S. state of Missouri. It is a tributary of Rock Creek.

The stream headwaters arise in eastern Clay Township at an elevation of approximately 1080 feet just southwest of the junction of U.S. Route 136 and Missouri Route J. The stream flows to the southwest to its confluence with Rock Creek approximately one mile south of the city of Rock Port at an elevation of 912 feet.

Volger apparently is a corruption of Vogler, the surname of a pioneer settler.

== See also ==
- Tributaries of the Missouri River
- List of rivers of Missouri
