= Mtarfa =

Mtarfa L-Imtarfa
- Local council
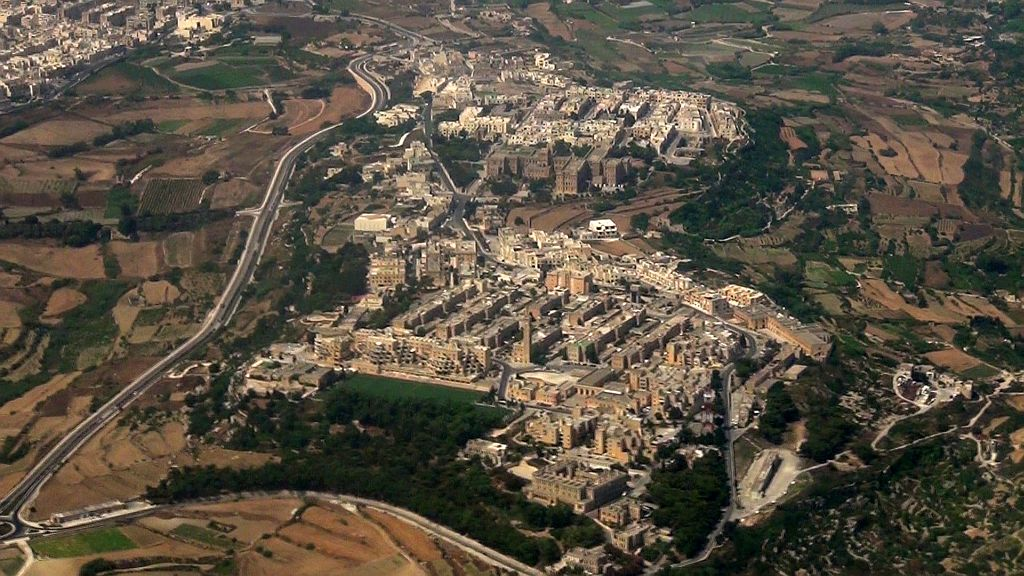
- Aerial view of Mtarfa

- Flag Coat of arms

- Coordinates: 35°53′27″N 14°23′49″E
- Country: Malta
- Region: Northern Region
- District: Western District
- Borders: Attard, Mdina, Rabat

Government
  - Mayor: Dale Hayman (PL)

Area
  - Total: 0.7 km^{2} (0.27 sq mi)

Population (Jul. 2024)
  - Total: 2,607
  - Density: 3,700/km^{2} (9,600/sq mi)
- Demonym(s): Mtarfi (m), Mtarfija (f), Mtarfin (pl)
- Time zone: UTC+1 (CET)
  - Summer (DST): UTC+2 (CEST)
- Postal code: MTF
- Dialing code: 356
- ISO 3166 code: MT-35
- Patron saint: Saint Lucy
- Day of festa: 13 December
- Website: Official website

Mtarfa (Maltese: L-Imtarfa) is a small town in the Northern Region of Malta. It was considered to be a suburb of Rabat until 2000, when it became a separate local council. It is twinned with the village of Pumpherston, Scotland. The population of Mtarfa was 2,607 in July 2024. This included 1,286 males and 1,321 females; 2,489 Maltese nationals and 118 foreign nationals.

== History ==
A number of historic silos were discovered in Mtarfa in October 1973.

In the Roman period, Mtarfa was a suburb of Melite, and it contained a Temple of Proserpina. The ruins of the temple were destroyed in the 17th and 18th centuries for reusing the stones in other buildings. Substantial remains of the suburb itself, including the arrangement of the streets and many tombs, survived until the late 19th century. In 1890, British military barracks began to be built in Mtarfa, destroying most of the Roman remains in the process.

A chapel dedicated to St. Lucy was first recorded in 1460, and is still standing to date. It is not currently in regular use.

A clock tower, now a prominent landmark of Mtarfa, was built in 1895. A naval hospital, RNH Mtarfa, was built during World War I, and it has now been converted to a state secondary school, named after Sir Temi Zammit. A chapel dedicated to St. Oswald was built by the British after the end of World War I.

The British left a prominent impact on the most visible architecture in town by building the St. David's Barracks. After the British left Malta, the barracks were reused for multiple purposes, primarily social housing, and the town expanded further more into other modern residential areas. In 1988, architects Keith Cole and Joseph M. Spiteri were commissioned to modify the barracks and convert them into homes for roughly 2,000 people. After completion, they were appointed to design other new apartments, as one building, on a site provided by the Housing Authority.

== Politics and administration ==
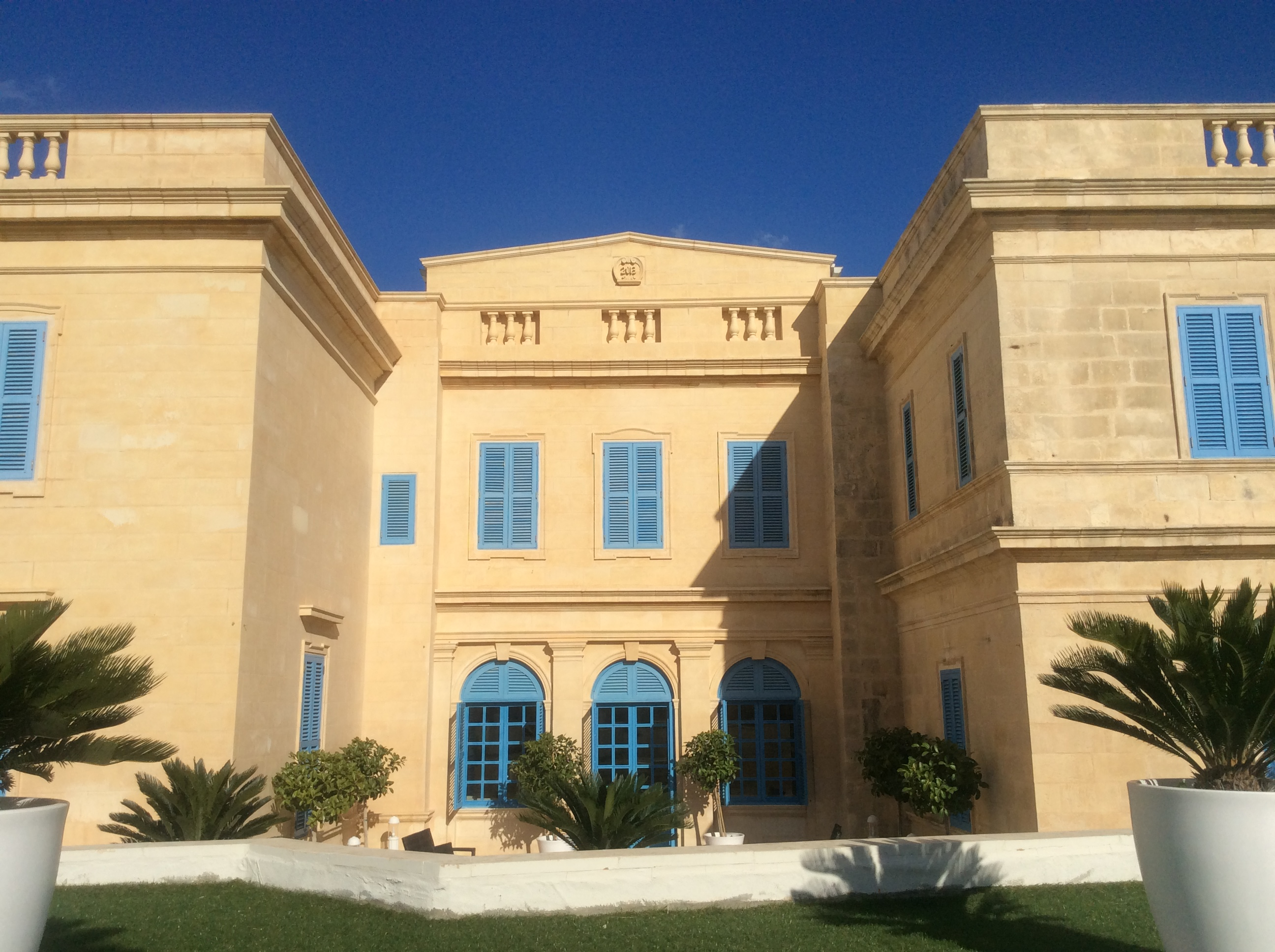
Dar Kenn Għal Saħħtek

Mtarfa was formerly part of Rabat local council, when local councils were first set up in Malta in 1993. In 2000 Mtarfa elected its first local council, after an amendment was made to the Local Councils Act.

In April 2008, due to failure on the part of the council to meet at least once a month as required by the Local Council Act, the Prime Minister Lawrence Gonzi recommended to the President of the Republic to dissolve the local council and to set up a temporary committee to administer the affairs of the locality. The Mtarfa local council had failed to meet since November 2007 allegedly over disagreements on the appointment of the council's Executive Secretary. A special election was held in 2008 after the dissolution of the council. The town has gone on to vote in further local council elections.

Mtarfa was declared an Autonomous Pastoral zone in 2000, and became an independent parish in the denomination of the Roman Catholic Church on 8 December 2004. The parish church is also dedicated to Saint Lucy.

== Sport ==
Mtarfa has its own football club, Mtarfa F.C. Founded in 2006, the club took part in the Maltese Third Division for the first time in their history in the 07/08 season. They entered the Malta Football Association in lieu of Ta' Xbiex F.C., who lost their status due to their consistent poor results in the lowest of Maltese divisions. Currently (2022–23) play in the Maltese Challenge League (second tier).

Former World Speedway Champion Mark Loram, who won the title representing Great Britain in 2000, was born in Mtarfa. British cyclist David Millar was also born in Mtarfa, and won a gold medal representing Malta at the 2001 Games of the Small States of Europe.

== Zones in Mtarfa ==
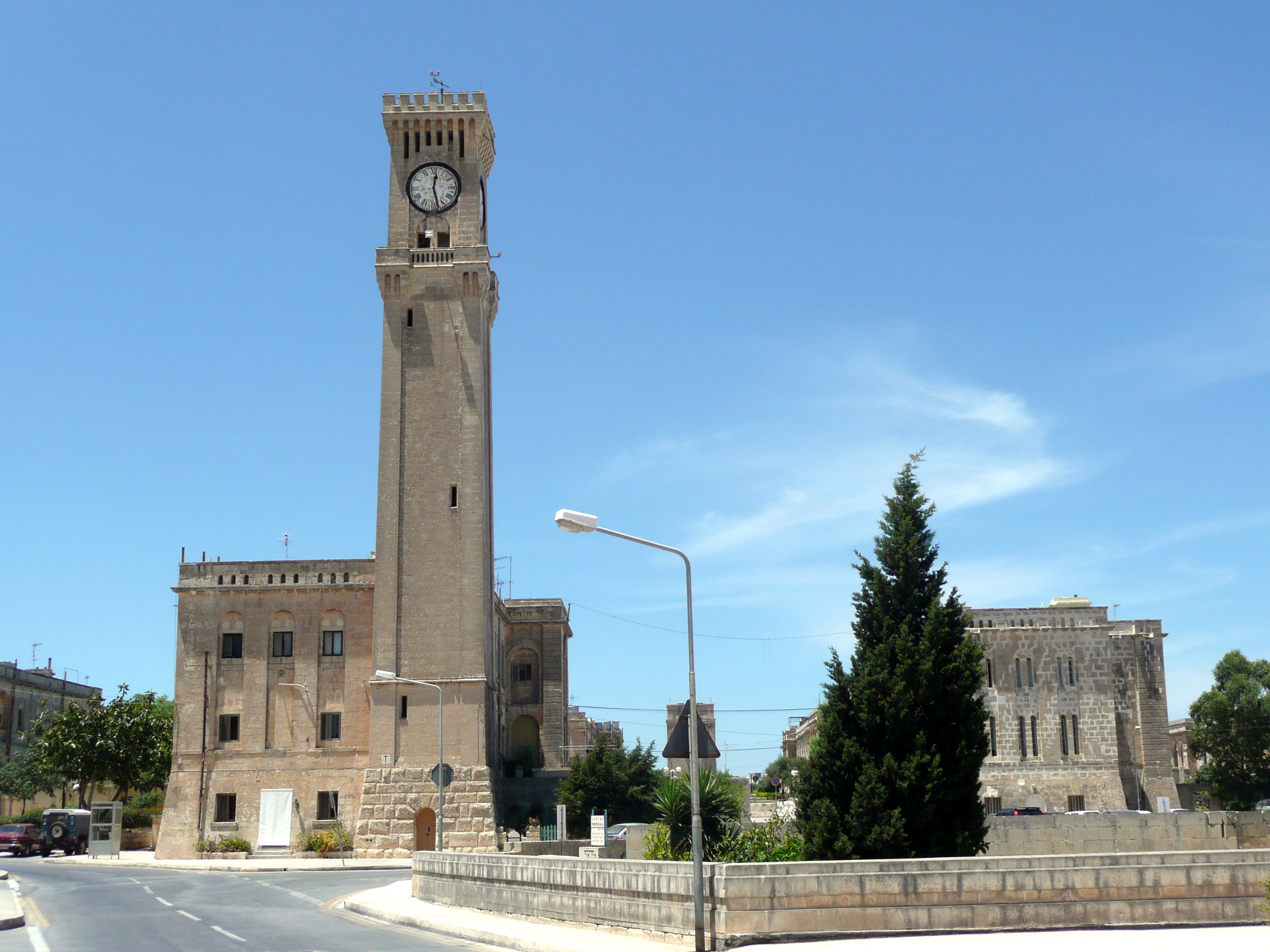
Mtarfa Clock Tower

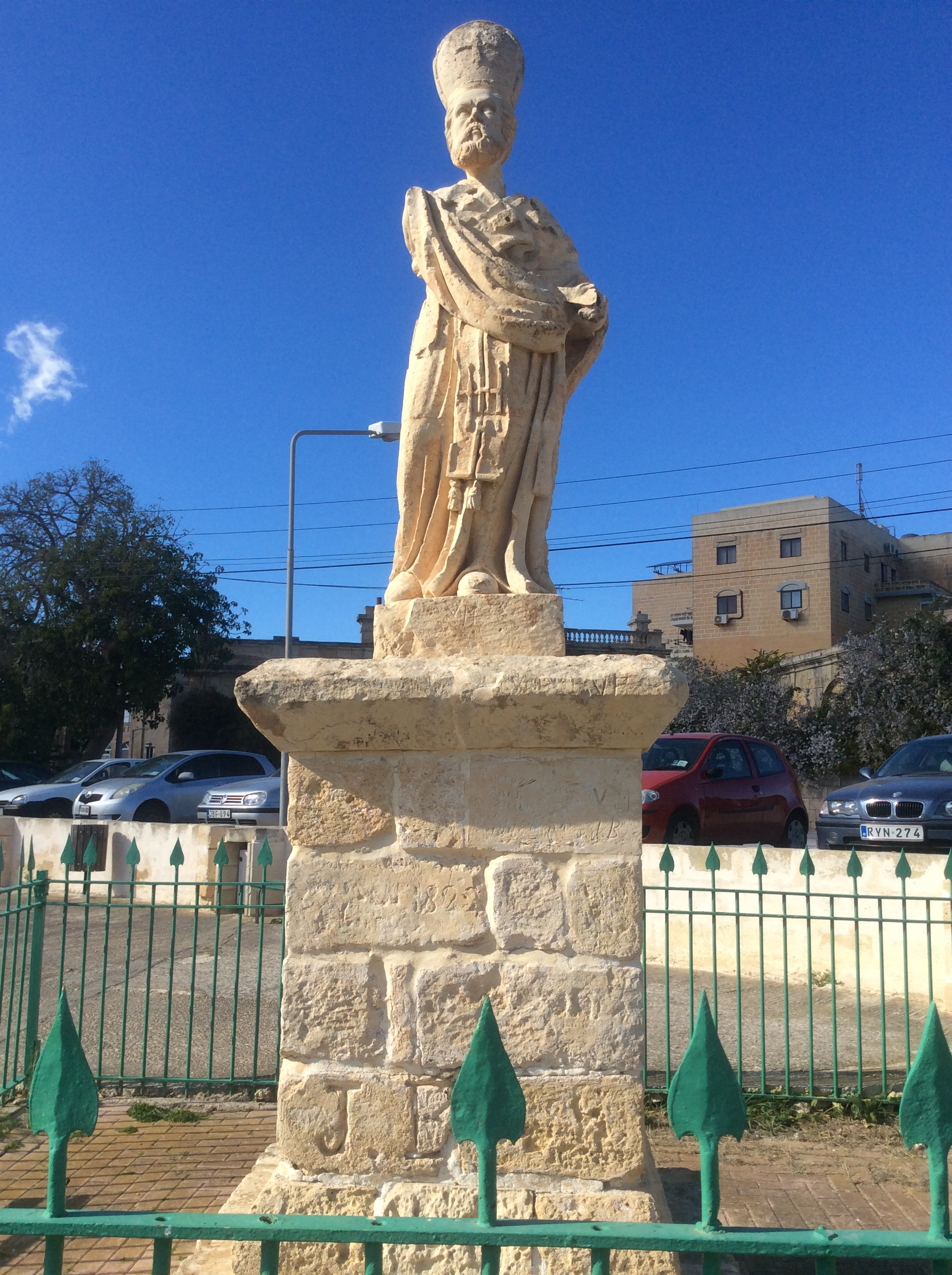
The Statue of St. Nicholas, which stands on the site of a former Temple of Proserpina

- Buqana
- Ġnien Ħira
- Ħaż-Żmien
- Il-Marġ
- It-Tabija
- Sandar
- Santa Luċija
- Ta' Sagħat
- Ta' Slampa
- Tal-Għeriexem
- Tal-Kanuni
- Tal-Maħruq
- Tar-Rangu
- Tat-Tabija
- Wied il-Qliegħa

== See also ==
- RNH Mtarfa
