= Temple of Proserpina =

Roman temple in Mtarfa, Malta

- Tempju ta' Proserpina
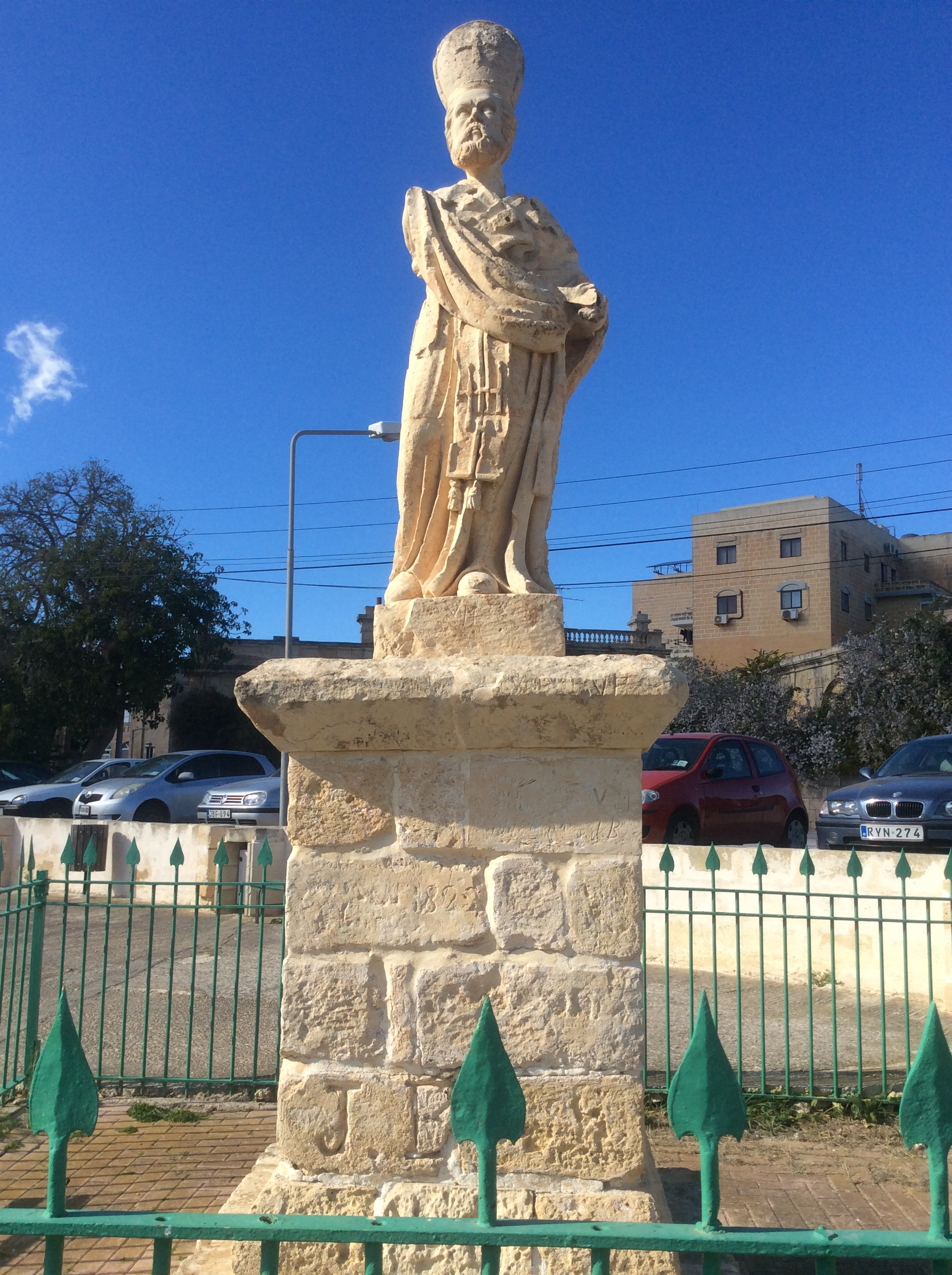
- Statue of St. Nicholas in Mtarfa stands on the site of the former Temple of Proserpina, Malta
- Interactive map of the Temple of Proserpina area

General information
- Status: Destroyed
- Type: Temple
- Architectural style: Ancient Roman
- Location: Mtarfa, Malta
- Coordinates: 35°53′29.6″N 14°24′4.6″E
- Construction started: Unknown
- Renovated: 1st century BC or AD
- Destroyed: Unknown, ruins cleared 17th–18th centuries

Technical details
- Material: Marble

The Temple of Proserpina or Temple of Proserpine (Maltese: Tempju ta' Proserpina) was a Roman temple in Mtarfa, Malta, an area which was originally a suburb outside the walls of Melite. It was dedicated to Proserpina, goddess of the underworld and renewal.

The date of construction is unknown, but it was renovated in the 1st century BC or AD. The ruins of the temple were discovered in 1613, and most of its marble blocks were later used in the decoration of buildings, including Auberge d'Italie and the Castellania in Valletta. Only a few fragments still survive today.

== History and architecture ==
The only epigraphic evidence of the temple is the Chrestion inscription, which was discovered among its ruins in 1613. It records that the temple was already old and was threatening to collapse during the reign of Augustus in the 1st century BC or AD, and it was restored by Chrestion, the procurator of the Maltese Islands. This inscription is the earliest known Latin text that was found in Malta. It read:

CHRESTION AVG. L PROC

INSVLARVM MELIT. ET GAVL
COLVMNAS CVM FASTIDIIS
ET PARIETIBVS TEMPLI DEÆ
PROSERPINÆ VETVSTATE
RVINAM IMMINIENTIBVS
................... RES
TITVIT SIMVL ET PILAM
INAVRAVIT.

(meaning Chrestion, a freedman of Augustus, Procurator of the islands of Melite and Gaulos, repaired the columns together with the roof and walls of the temple of the goddess Proserpina, that through age were ready to tumble down, he likewise gilded the pillar.)

The temple was built out of marble and its columns were in the Corinthian order. If still in use by the 4th century, the temple would have been closed during the persecution of pagans in the late Roman Empire.

== Discovery of remains and destruction ==
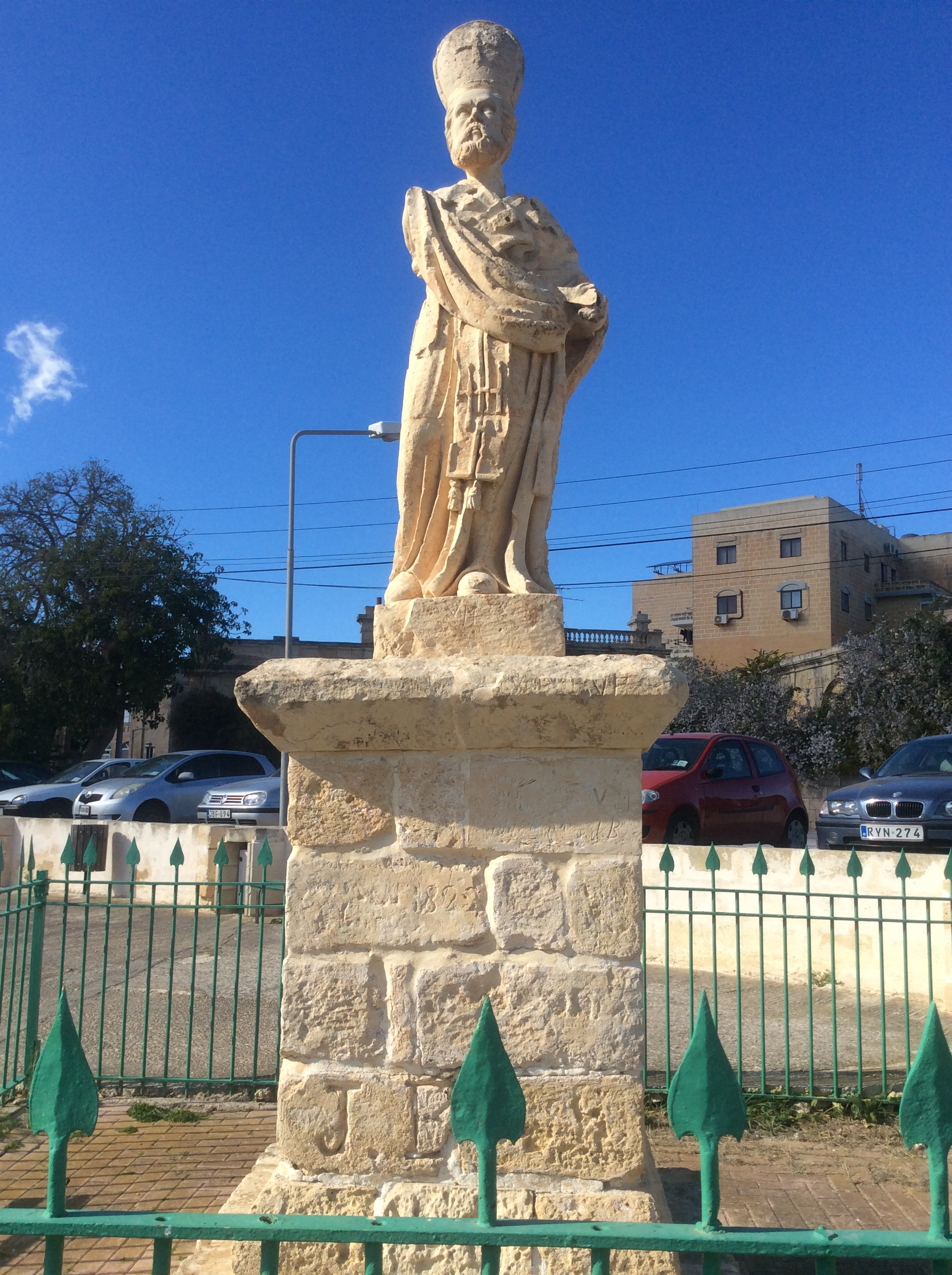
The Statue of Saint Nicholas of Bari now stands on the site of the temple. The statue is on the National Inventory of the Cultural Property of the Maltese Islands (NICPMI).

A chapel dedicated to Saint Nicholas was eventually built near the site of the temple. In 1613, while digging the foundations for a statue of that saint near the chapel, many large blocks of marble from the temple were found, together with pillars, cornices, capitals and carved slabs including the Chrestion inscription. The chapel no longer exists, but the statue of St. Nicholas still stands on the site of the temple.

The discovery of the temple was recorded by Giovanni Francesco Abela in his 1647 book Della Descrizione di Malta Isola nel Mare Siciliano con le sue Antichità, ed Altre Notizie.

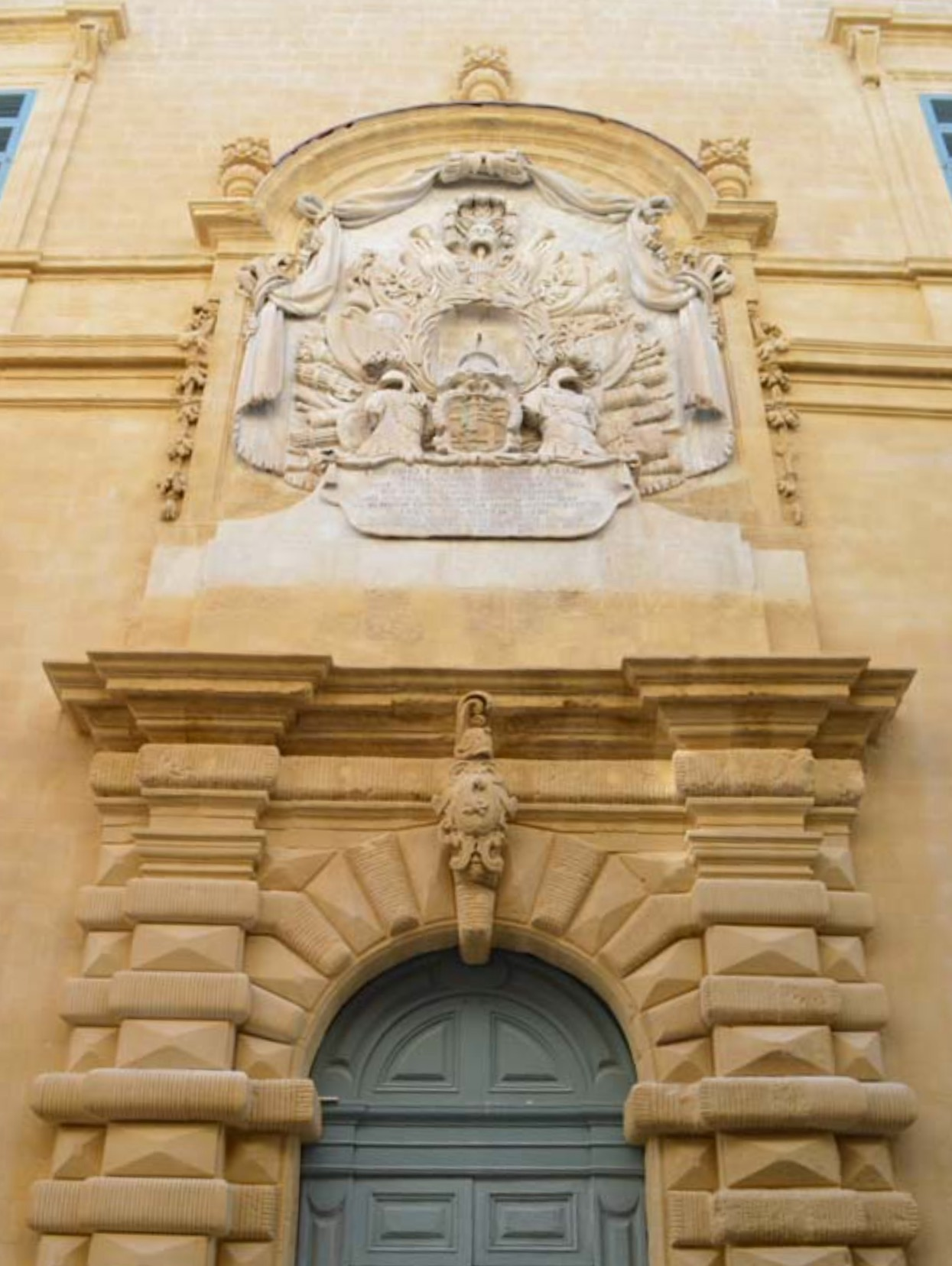
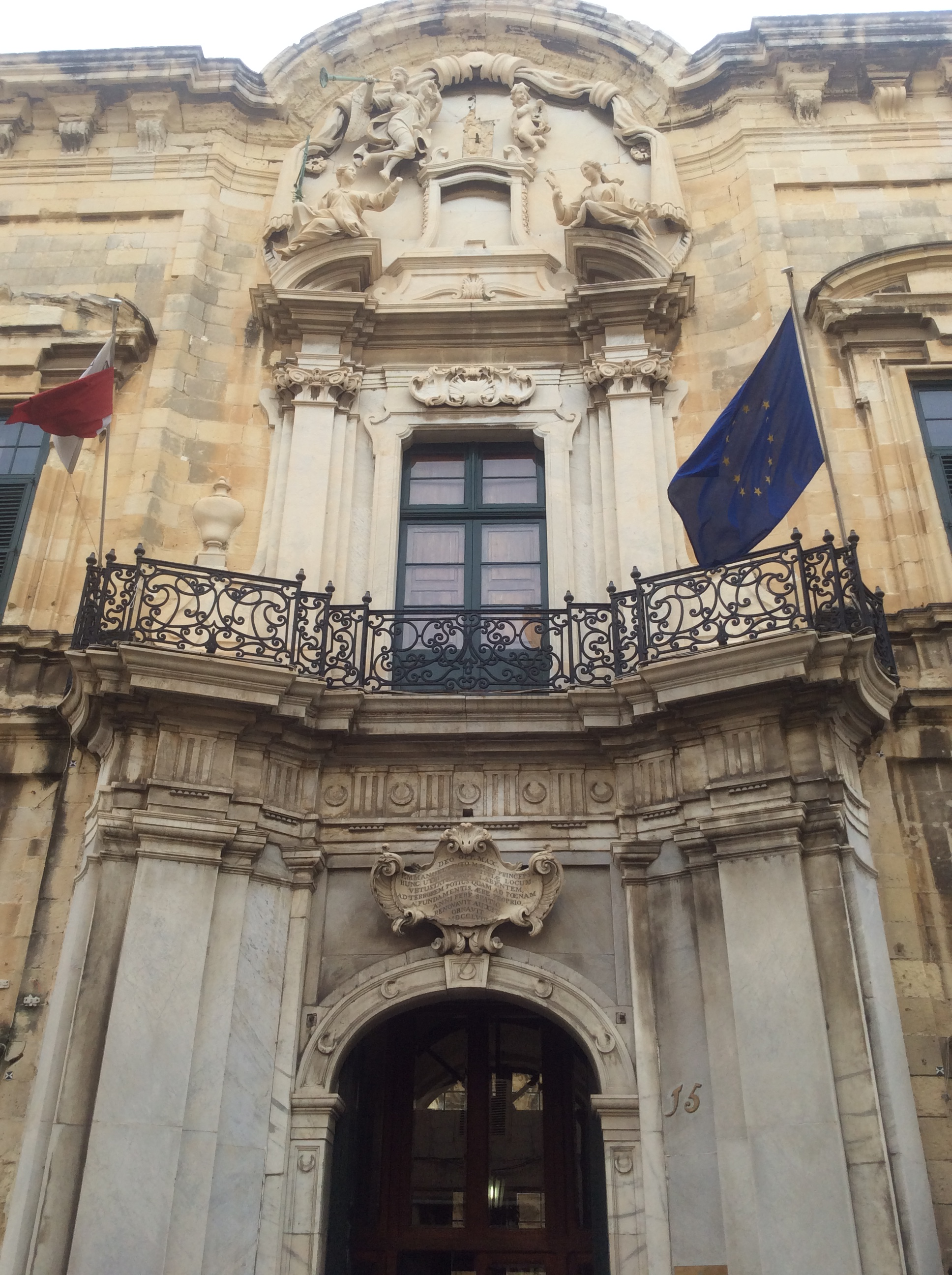
Some of the marble used in the façades of Auberge d'Italie (1680s) and the Castellania (1757–60) in Valletta was taken from the ruins of the Temple of Proserpina.

Over the following centuries, most of the remains of the temple were used in the construction of new buildings. In the 1680s, some marble blocks were used to carve the trophy of Gregorio Carafa above the main entrance of Auberge d'Italie in Valletta. The façade of the Castellania, which was built in the late 1750s, also contains marble cannibalized from the Temple of Proserpina.

The temple was a very frequented site by almost all archeologist on the islands in the 19th century. In A hand book, or guide, for strangers visiting Malta, written by Thomas MacGill in 1839, it is mentioned that "not a vestige of [the temple] remains above ground", but some fragments were found at the Public Library in Valletta.

The archaeologist Antonio Annetto Caruana examined the site of the temple in 1882, and found no remains except for some holes dug in the rock. He recorded that some capitals, pillars and cornices were piled up in the square in front of the Mdina cathedral, while other remains were found in the private collection of Mr. Sant Fournier.

Today, only a few fragments from the temple still exist. These include a fluted marble column shaft and part of a cornice. Only a few broken fragments of the original Chrestion inscription have survived.

== See also ==
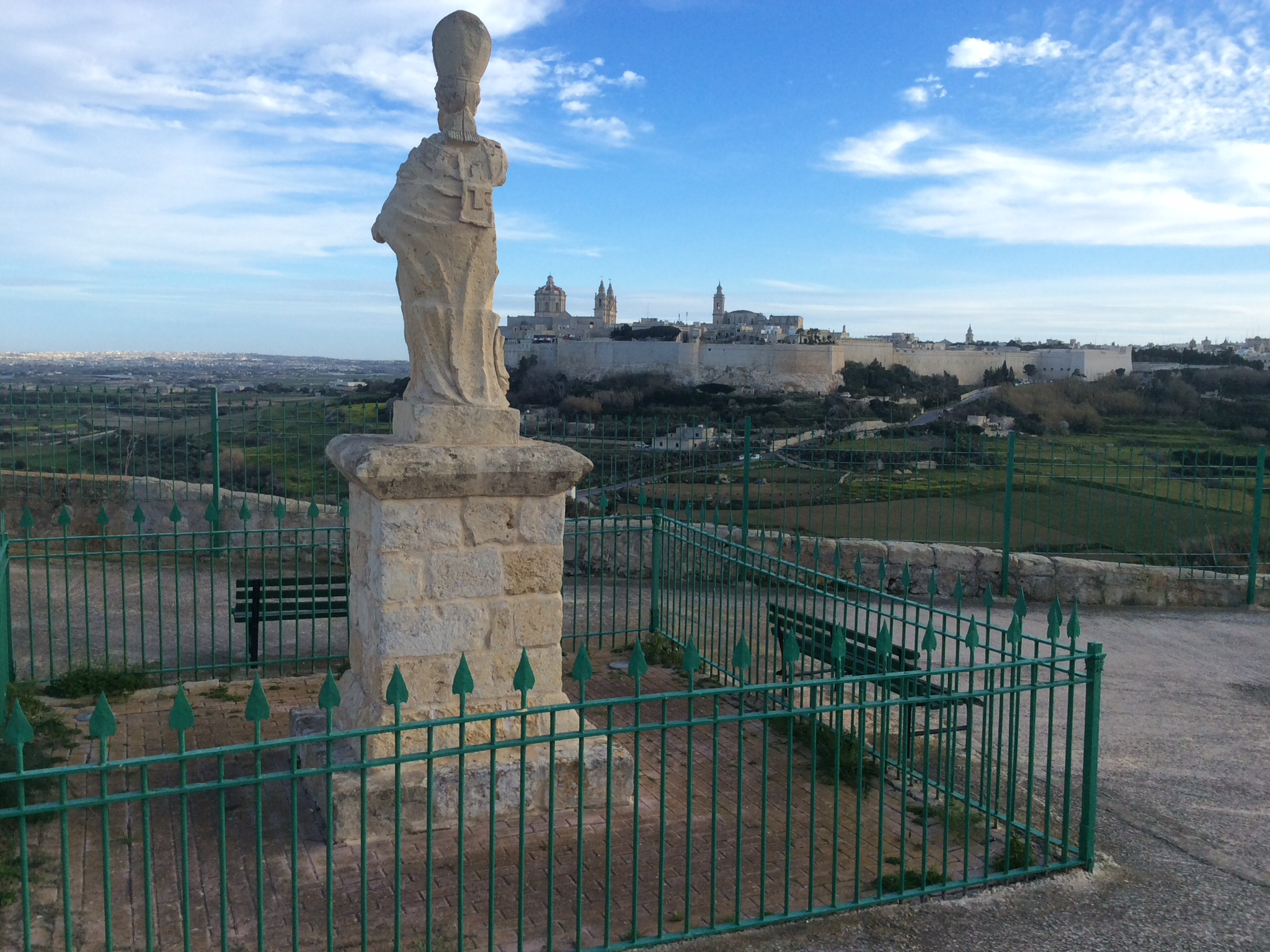
Statue of St. Nicholas and Mdina at far

- List of Ancient Roman temples
- Temple of Apollo (Melite)
