= Michael J. Burg =

American actor

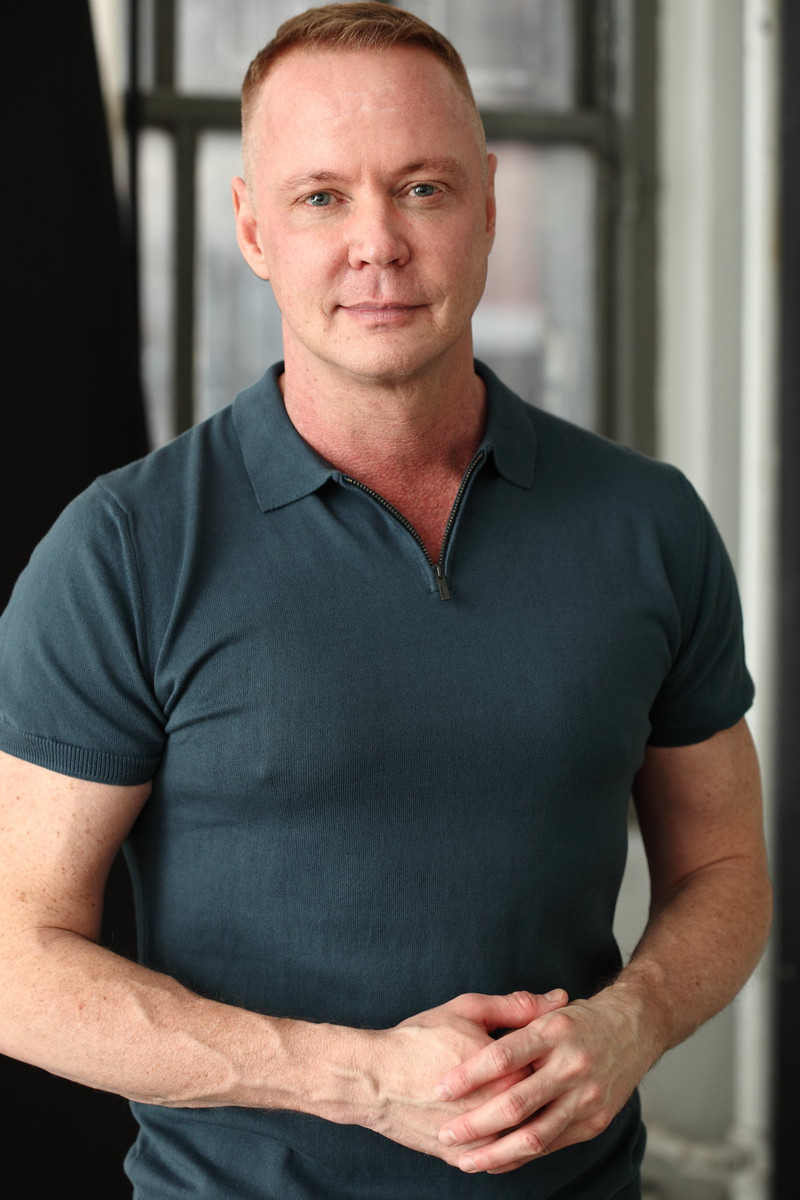
- Born: December 28, 1963; Kansas City, Missouri

Michael James Burg (born December 28, 1963) is an American actor. He was born in Kansas City, Missouri.

== Career ==
Michael J. Burg is a film, television and stage actor and a longtime member of the Actors Studio. A native of Rock Port, Missouri, he has resided in New York City since age 19. After graduating from The American Academy of Dramatic Arts, he studied acting privately for a number of years with Estelle Parsons.

Michael's career dates back to high school, when he worked as a commercial radio announcer, initially with local FM station KTRX. He quickly moved into the regional market by working with stations KKJO-FM and KSFT-FM, which broadcast to the Missouri, Iowa, Nebraska and Kansas areas.

Over the past 20-plus years Michael has worked with some of the finest directors in the industry, including Martin Scorsese, Ang Lee, Spike Lee, Neil Jordan, Lasse Hallstrom, Bennett Miller, Morgan Spurlock and Amy Poehler.

Michael has depicted Truman Capote three times, most notably opposite Jennifer Love Hewitt in The Audrey Hepburn Story. He also appeared in Capote opposite Philip Seymour Hoffman, playing Tennessee Williams, a distant cousin of Truman Capote's. His scenes as Capote were not in the final cut of The Hoax. Lastly he played Capote in the ABC series Life on Mars.

Michael is also active in the world of independent film producing. Having served as executive producer for the 2011 feature film, "Turbine" and the 2016 feature film "The Eyes".

Some of Burg's recent credits include the feature film Love is Strange appearing opposite Alfred Molina and John Lithgow, Broad City on Comedy Central, the role of Detective Charley Griggs in Gotham, HBO's The Night of directed and written by Steve Zaillian and HBO's 2016 series Vinyl, created by Martin Scorsese, Mick Jagger and Terence Winter.

== Personal life ==
He is the only child of James K. Burg, a farmer and LaVerta (Lane), a nurse. Burg lived in Missouri until the age of 19, working in radio, at stations KTRX 93.5 and KKJO, until moving to New York City to attend the American Academy of Dramatic Arts. Burg resides in the Columbus Circle area of Manhattan. As well as being an actor and film producer, Burg occasionally directs NY theatre pieces. After his father's death, when he was still in high school, Burg inherited his paternal family's 6th generation farmland in Atchison County, Missouri, which sits in one of America's wind farm belts. He still owns and manages Burg farms in Atchison County. He visits Rock Port, Missouri regularly throughout the year and is a member of The United Methodist Church there.
