= Rock Creek (upper Missouri River tributary) =

Stream in Iowa and Missouri, U.S.

Location
- Country: United States
- State: Iowa and Missouri
- County: Fremont County, Iowa and Atchison County, Missouri

Physical characteristics
- Source
  - location: Fisher Township
  - coordinates: 40°40′04″N 95°22′41″W
  - elevation: 1,160 ft (350 m)
- Mouth: Missouri River
  - location: Clark Township
  - coordinates: 40°18′01″N 95°34′01″W
  - elevation: 866 ft (264 m)
- Length: 31.5 mi (50.7 km)

Basin features
- Progression: Rock Creek → Missouri River → Mississippi River → Atlantic Ocean

Rock Creek is a stream in Fremont County, Iowa and Atchison County, Missouri in the United States. It is a tributary of the Missouri River and is 31.5 miles long, with 7 miles of its length being in Iowa and the rest in Missouri.

== Etymology ==
Rock Creek was named for the rocky character of its creek bed. It is the namesake for the town of Rock Port, Missouri.

== History ==
The first Westerner to settle along Rock Creek was William Hunter in 1842. The Rockport, Langdon, and Northern Line of the Chicago, Burlington, and Quincy Railroad traveled from Langdon to Rock Port along the valley of Rock Creek, through the Loess bluffs of the Missouri River Valley.

On July 18, 1965, there was a flood near the mouth of Boney Branch of Rock Creek near the western city limits of Rock Port after two consecutive torrential rainfalls. The peak discharge was calculated at 5,080 cu ft/s (144 m^{3}/s).

== Geography ==
=== Course ===
Rock Creek begins in southeastern Fisher Township near the Fremont-Page county border. It travels south, then southwest across US 59 before entering Missouri 5.5 miles (8.9 km) northwest of Westboro. The stream continues south-southwest through northern Atchison County before reaching the county seat, Rock Port. It passes north–south through the middle of town and travels alongside Route 111 through the bluffs towards the flooplain. It enters the Missouri River just northwest of the Atchison-Holt border across from Nemaha County, Nebraska.

Rock Creek used to flow into the Nishnabotna River before the Nishnabotna changed its course in the 20th Century. Most of Rock Creek in the Missouri River floodplains has been made into a channelized ditch called Rock Creek Ditch

=== Tributaries ===
There are three named tributaries of the Rock River, all of which are in Atchison County: Boney Branch, Turkey Creek, and Volger Branch.

=== Crossings ===
Rock Creek crosses one railroad, the BNSF, and nine highways. The highways crossed in Iowa are US 59 and secondary highways J52, J56, and J64. The highways crossed in Missouri are: I-29, US 136, Route 111, and Routes B and F.

== See also ==
- Tributaries of the Missouri River
- List of rivers of Iowa
- List of rivers of Missouri
