= St Oswald's Church, Mtarfa =

St Oswald's Church
- Knisja ta' San Oswaldu
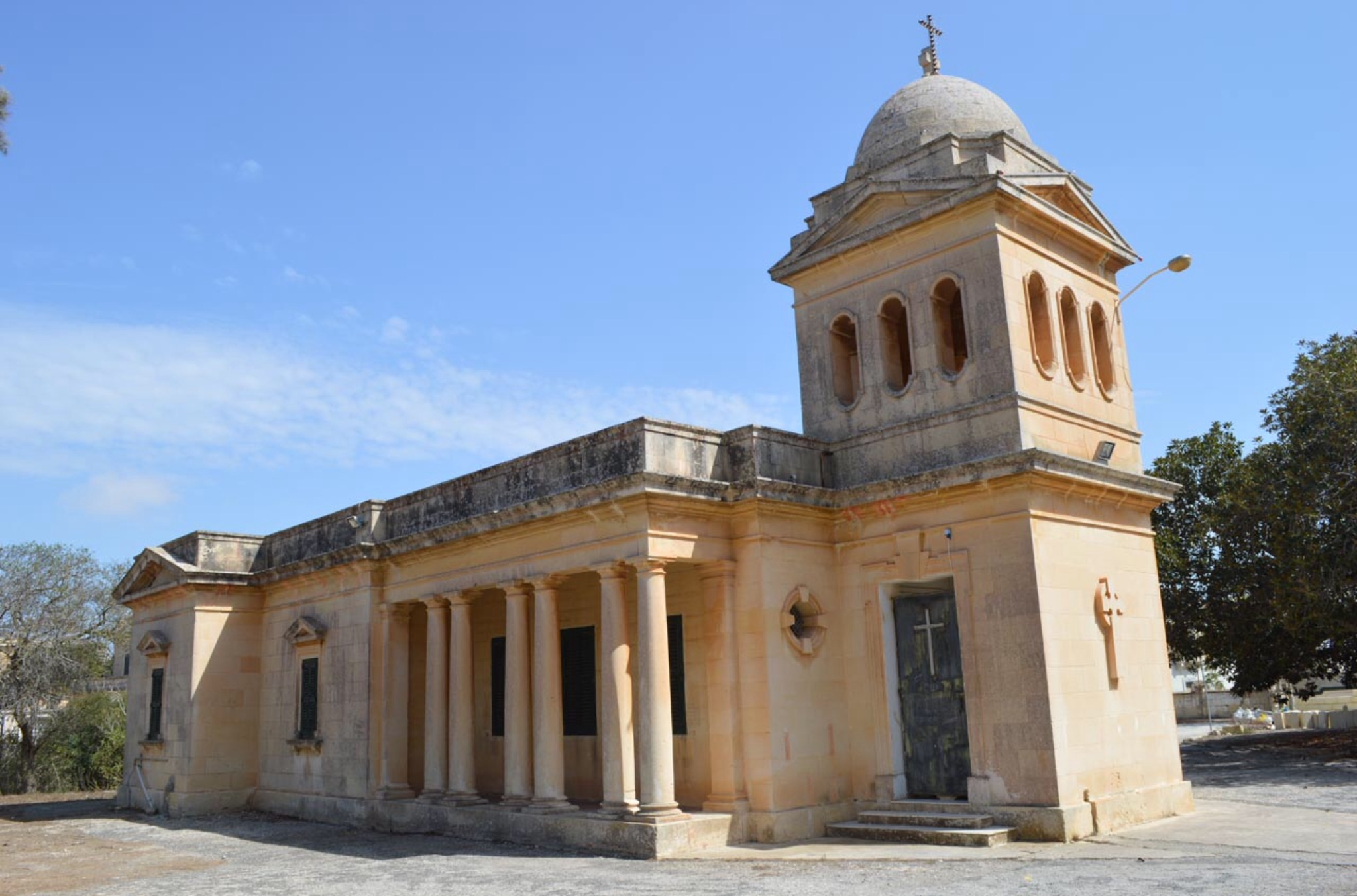

- Location within Malta
- 35°53′25.2″N 14°23′46.1″E
- Location: Mtarfa
- Country: Malta
- Denomination: Roman Catholic
- Previous denomination: Church of England

History
- Status: Active
- Dedication: Oswald of Northumbria

Architecture
- Functional status: Church
- Completed: 1921

Administration
- Archdiocese: Malta
- Parish: Mtarfa

Clergy
- Archbishop: Charles Scicluna

The Church of St Oswald or as it was formerly known as St Oswald's Garrison Church is a former Church of England military church located in the former Mtarfa Barracks and grounds of the former RNH Mtarfa. Nowadays the church is used for Roman Catholic services.

== History ==
The British started to develop the area known as Mtarfa around the end of the 19th century. When the RNH Mtarfa was built after WWI, the chapel dedicated to St Oswald of Northumbria was constructed to serve the spiritual needs of the stationed navy personnel. It was dedicated on March 12, 1921. After the departure of the British forces in 1979, the chapel fell into disuse. Some years later, the chapel was reopened and blessed as a Roman Catholic chapel. It is still in use. The chapel has one altar and a stone pulpit.
