= Temple of Apollo (Melite) =

- Tempju t'Apollo
- Interactive map of the Temple of Apollo area

General information
- Status: Destroyed
- Type: Temple
- Architectural style: Ancient Roman
- Location: Mdina, Malta
- Coordinates: 35°53′7.2″N 14°24′12″E
- Completed: 2nd century

Technical details
- Material: Marble

The Temple of Apollo (Maltese: Tempju t'Apollo) was a Roman temple in the city of Melite, in modern Mdina, Malta. It was dedicated to Apollo, the god of the sun and music. The temple was built in the 2nd century AD, and it overlooked a semi-circular theatre. The temple's ruins were discovered in the 18th century, and many architectural fragments were dispersed among private collections or reworked into new sculptures. Parts of the temple's crepidoma still exist, having been rediscovered in 2002.

== History and architecture ==
The Temple of Apollo might have been built on the site of an earlier Punic sacred structure. It is believed to have been built in the 2nd century AD, and an inscription recording a private benefactor paying for the construction of parts of the temple was discovered in 1747.

The temple was built out of marble, and it had a tetrastyle portico with Ionic columns, raised on a podium. It overlooked a semi-circular theatre. The temple's architecture was influenced by the Carthaginian style, as it also resembled the style popular in Roman North Africa.

If still in use by the 4th-century, the temple would have been closed during the persecution of pagans in the late Roman Empire, when the Christian Emperors issued edicts prohibiting all non-Christian worship and sanctuaries.

== Remains ==
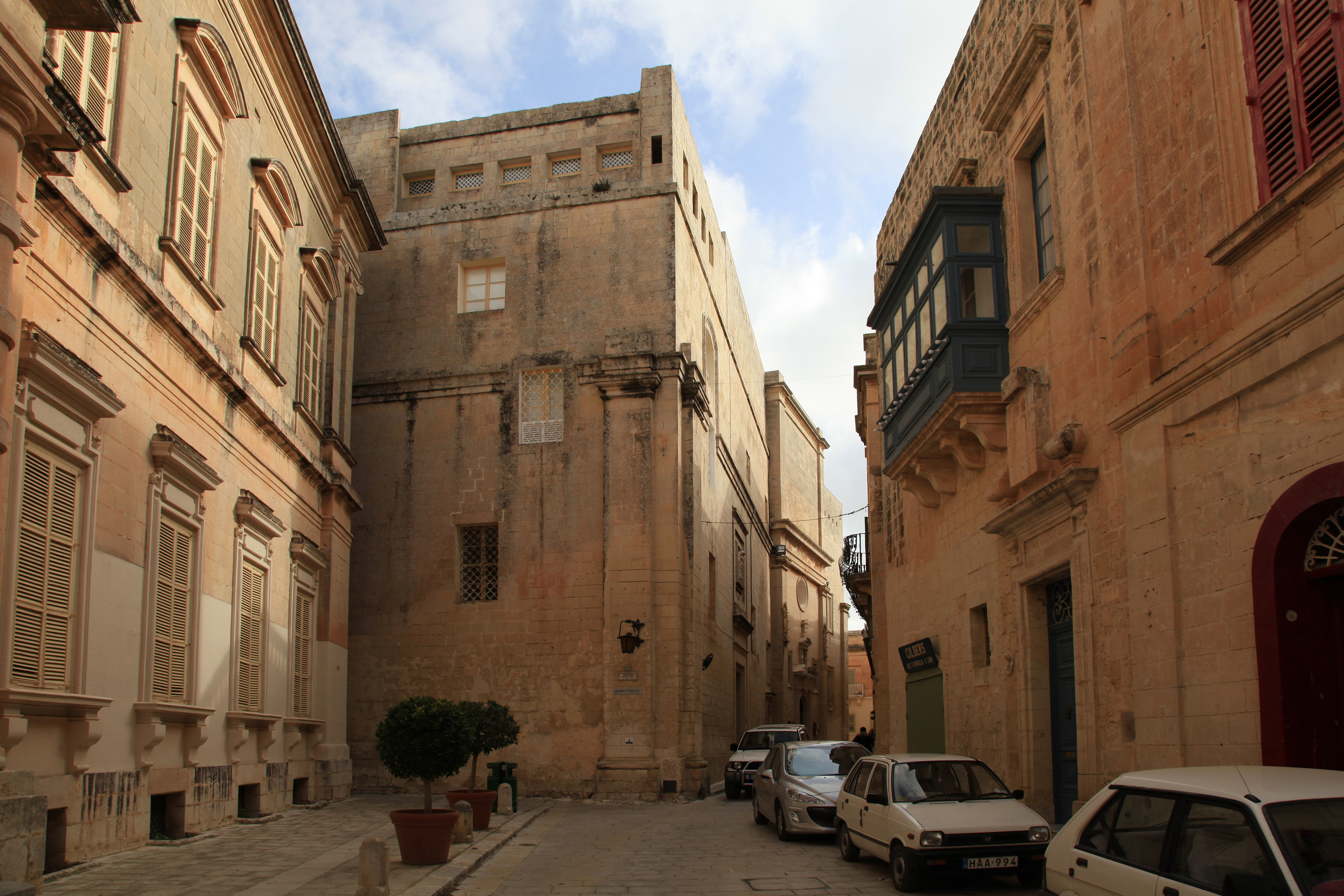
Some remains of the temple still survive beneath Villegaignon Street

Some remains of the temple were discovered in 1710, and marble blocks from temple were taken and sculpted into altars and decorative elements for various houses and churches, including St. Paul's Cathedral in Mdina, St. Paul's Grotto in Rabat and the Franciscan Church of St Mary of Jesus and the Church of the Holy Souls in Valletta.

More ruins of the temple and the nearby theatre were discovered near St. Peter's Monastery in Mdina in 1747. These remains included marble pillars, capitals, cornices and blocks, as well as an inscription recording the temple's construction. Another inscription recording the construction of a temple was found near the same monastery in 1868, and although the name of the deity to whom this temple was dedicated to is lost, it is possible to have originated from the Temple of Apollo.

In A hand book, or guide, for strangers visiting Malta, written by Thomas MacGill in 1839, it is mentioned that "not a vestige of [the temple] is now visible". The archaeologist Antonio Annetto Caruana, writing in 1882, recorded that some of the remains discovered in 1710 and 1747 were in private collections, including that of Mr. Sant Fournier.

In March 2002, a wall forming part of the temple's crepidoma was discovered during a public works project in Villegaignon Street, and it was subsequently excavated by the Archaeology Services Cooperative.

== See also ==
- List of Ancient Roman temples
- Temple of Proserpina
