= Langdon, Missouri =

Unincorporated community in Missouri, U.S.

Coordinates: 40°21′23″N 95°34′47″W

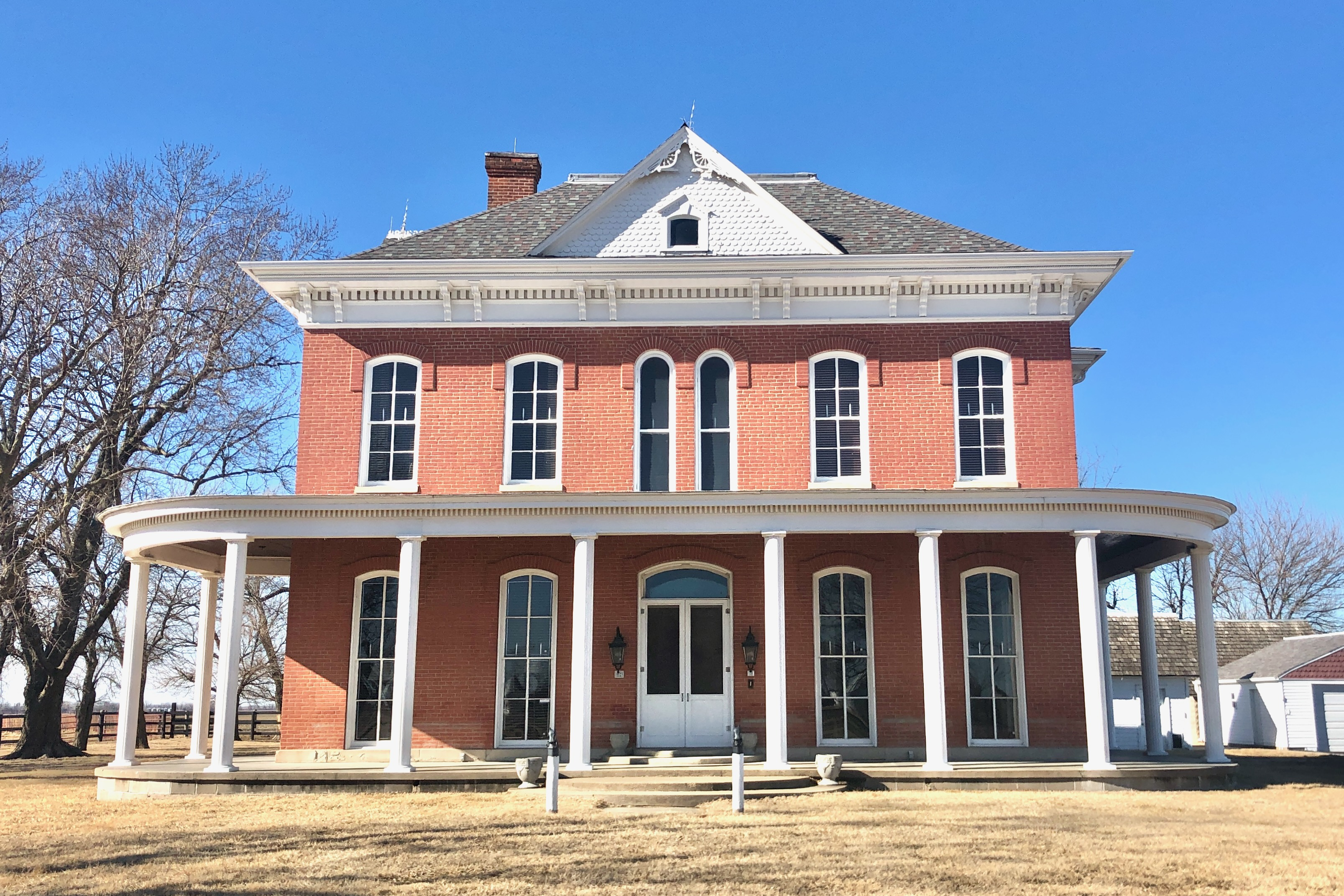
Thompson-Campell Farmstead at Langdon

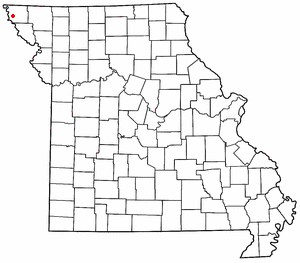

Langdon is an unincorporated community in Atchison County, Missouri, United States. It is located about six miles southwest of Rock Port. Its post office has closed and mail is now delivered through Fairfax.

== History ==
Langdon was laid out in 1880 along the main line of the Burlington Railroad. The community was named after John Langdon, a railroad official. A post office called Langdon was established in 1880, and remained in operation until 1979. The population was about 30 in 1915.

The Thompson–Campbell Farmstead, the original settlement of Langdon, was listed on the National Register of Historic Places in 2003.
