= Walnut Inn =

- U.S. National Register of Historic Places
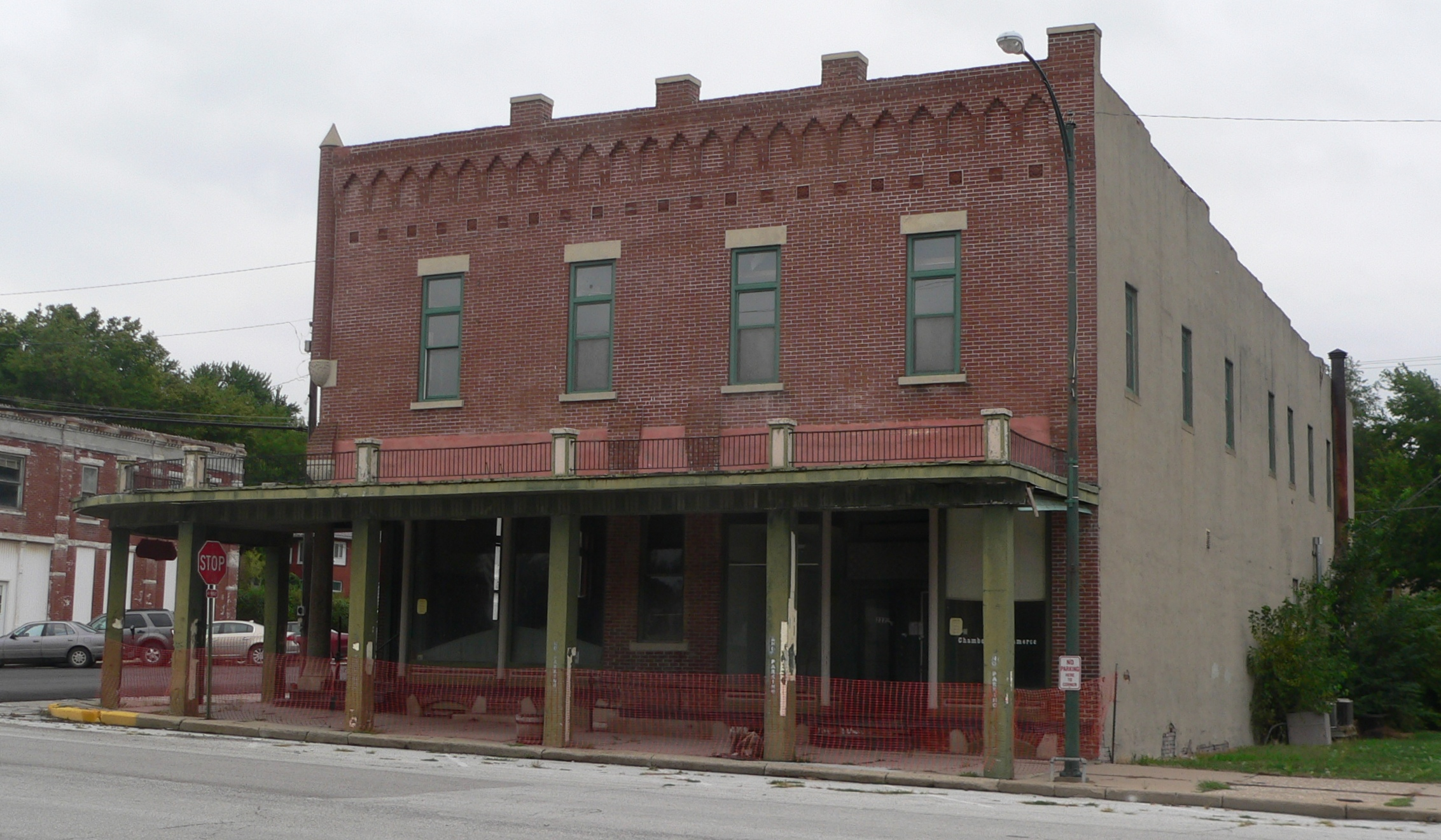
- Walnut Inn, September 2013

- Location within Missouri Location within the United States
- Location: 224 Main St., Tarkio, Missouri
- Coordinates: 40°26′27″N 95°22′41″W
- Area: less than one acre
- Built: c. 1884, 1911
- NRHP reference No.: 82003124
- Added to NRHP: April 12, 1982

Walnut Inn, also known as the Hanna, Hunter, & Co., Hanna Travis & Co., and Williamson & Travis, was a historic hotel and commercial building located at Tarkio, Atchison County, Missouri. It was built as a store about 1884 and converted to a hotel in 1911. It was a two-story, rectangular brick building. The building measured 54 feet wide and extended 100 feet deep. It featured a wraparound porch.

It was listed on the National Register of Historic Places in 1982. In recent years, the building fell into disrepair until it was torn down starting on May 22, 2017.
