= John Dickinson Dopf Mansion =

Historic house in Missouri, United States

- U.S. National Register of Historic Places
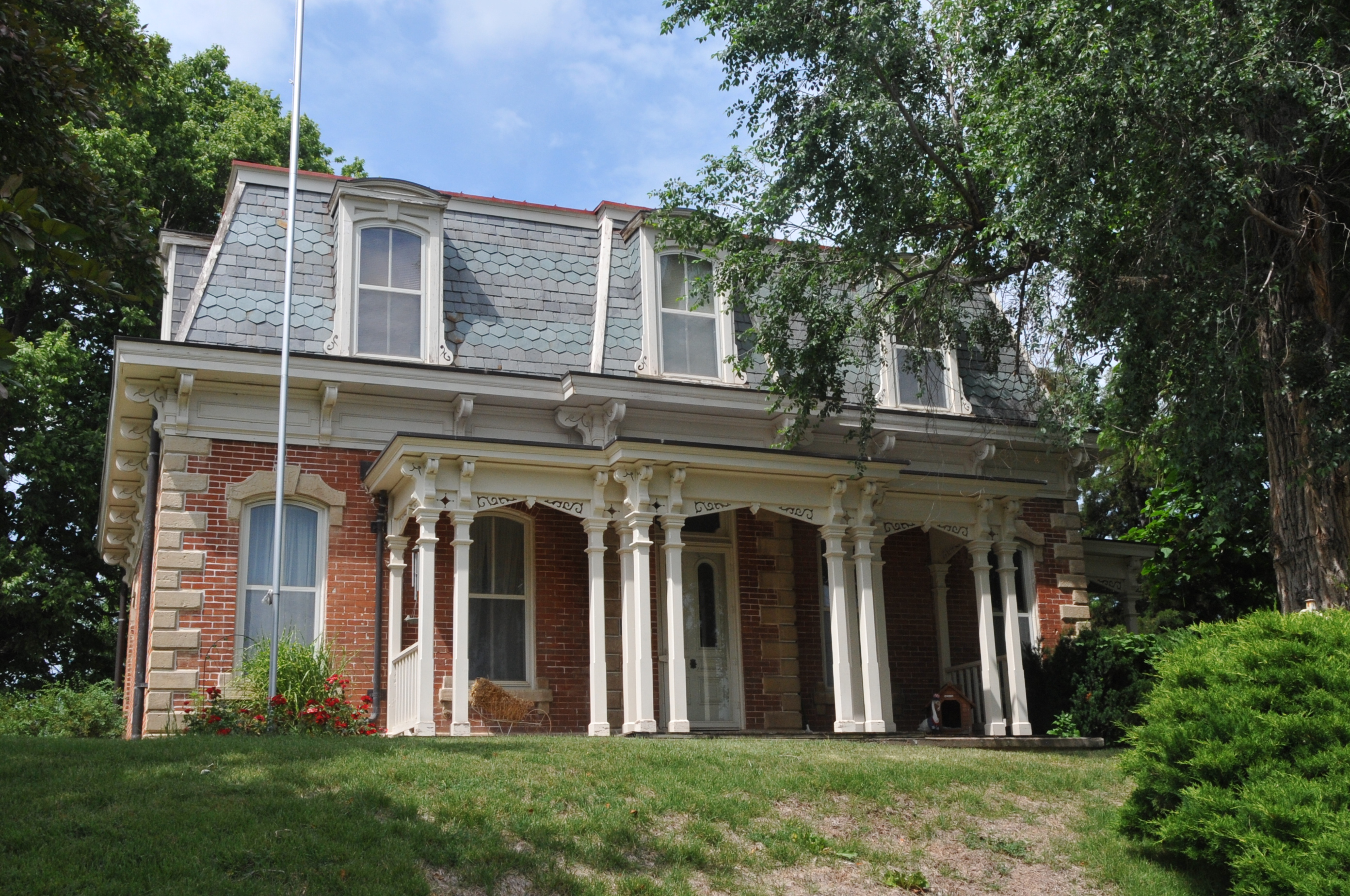
- John Dickinson Dopf Mansion, July 2013

- Location within Missouri Location within the United States
- Location: 407 Cass St., Rock Port, Missouri
- Coordinates: 40°24′43″N 95°31′7″W
- Area: less than one acre
- Built: 1876
- Architect: Menz, J.; McArthur, D.A.
- Architectural style: Second Empire
- NRHP reference No.: 84003858
- Added to NRHP: February 8, 1984

John Dickinson Dopf Mansion is a historic home located at Rock Port, Atchison County, Missouri. It was built in 1876, and is a two-story, Second Empire style brick dwelling. It features a mansard roof ornamented with alternating bands of hexagonal and square slate shingles and a one-story front porch.

It was listed on the National Register of Historic Places in 1984.
