= Rankin Hall =

- U.S. National Register of Historic Places
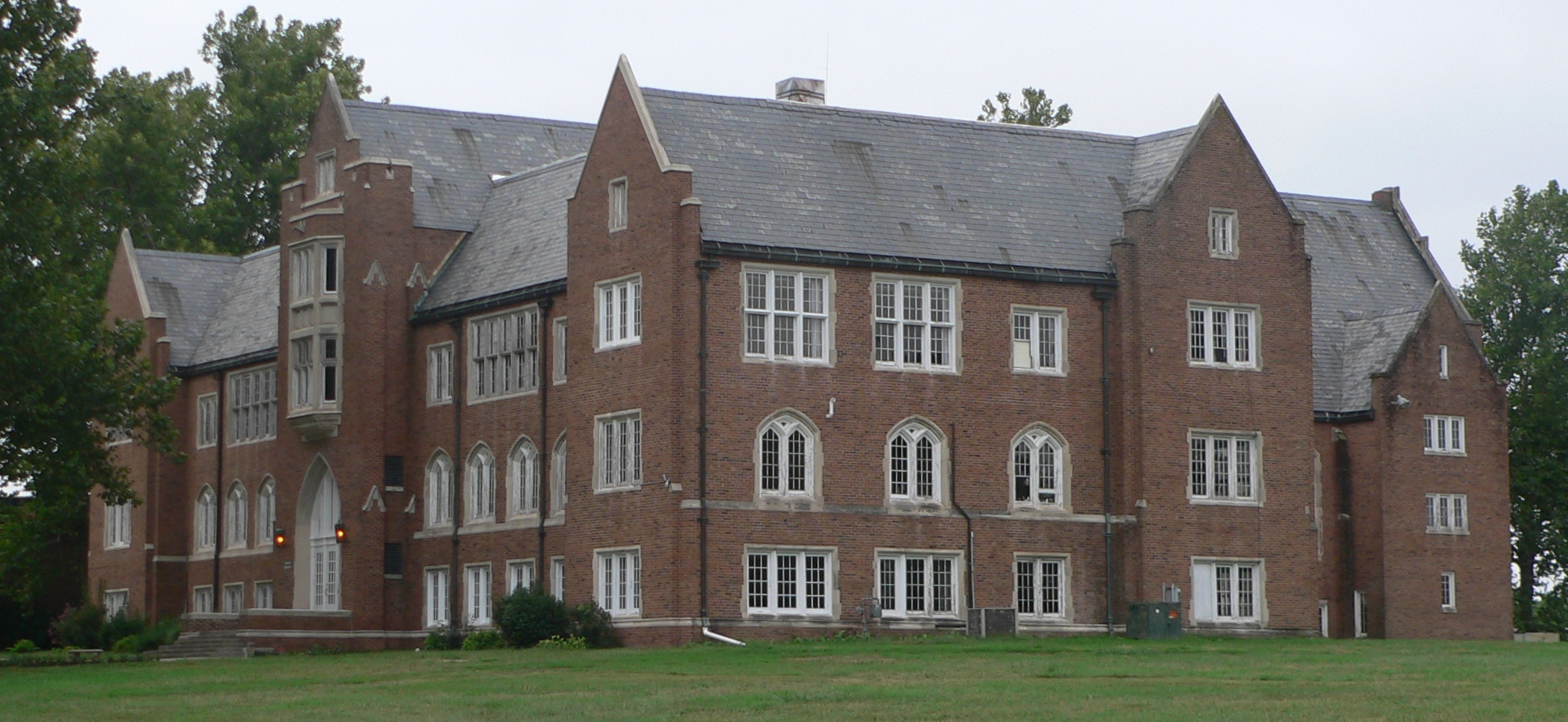
- Rankin Hall, September 2013

- Location within Missouri Location within the United States
- Location: 402 N. 13th St., Tarkio, Missouri
- Coordinates: 40°26′41″N 95°23′32″W
- Area: 0.6 acres (0.24 ha)
- Built: 1930-1931
- Architect: Felt, Dunham & Kriehn; Busboom Bros.
- Architectural style: Late Gothic Revival, Tudor Revival
- NRHP reference No.: 10000022
- Added to NRHP: February 17, 2010

Rankin Hall, also known as the Administration Building and Chapel of Tarkio College, is a historic building located on the campus of the former Tarkio College at Tarkio, Atchison County, Missouri. It was built in 1930–1931, and is a 3 1/2-story, T-shaped, Collegiate Gothic style brick and stone building. The building measures 144 feet wide and extends 141 feet deep. It features steep projecting gables with stepped parapets, numerous pointed arch windows, buttresses, and a mix of limestone and cast stone trim. The building served as the Presbyterian college's administration building and chapel.

It was listed on the National Register of Historic Places in 2010.
