= Thompson–Campbell Farmstead =

Historic house in northwest Missouri, U.S.

- U.S. National Register of Historic Places
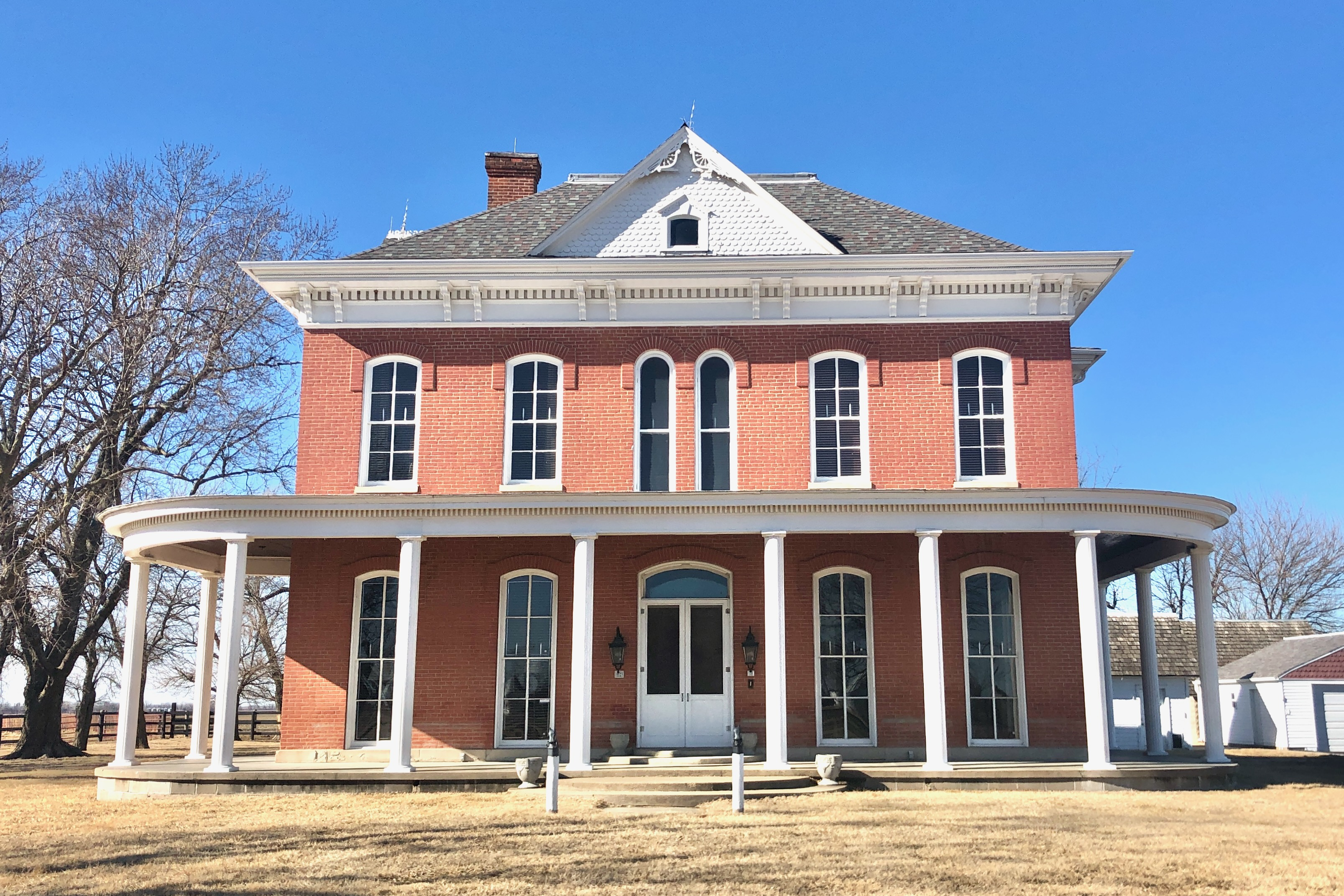

- Location within Missouri Location within the United States
- Nearest city: 25579 MO U, near Langdon, Missouri
- Coordinates: 40°21′30″N 95°34′51″W
- Area: 12.4 acres (5.0 ha)
- Built: 1871
- Architectural style: Italianate
- NRHP reference No.: 03001056
- Added to NRHP: October 18, 2003

Thompson–Campbell Farmstead, also known as the Philip Austin and Susan Buckham Thompson Farmstead, is a historic home and farm located near Langdon, Atchison County, Missouri. The farmhouse was built in 1871, and is a 2 1/2-story, Italianate style brick dwelling with a two-story rear ell. It features a one-story front porch supported by fluted Doric order columns that replaced an earlier porch in 1905. Also on the property are the contributing icehouse and shed (c. 1900).

It was listed on the National Register of Historic Places in 2003.
