= RNH Mtarfa =

Coordinates: 35°53′23.30″N 14°23′44.15″E

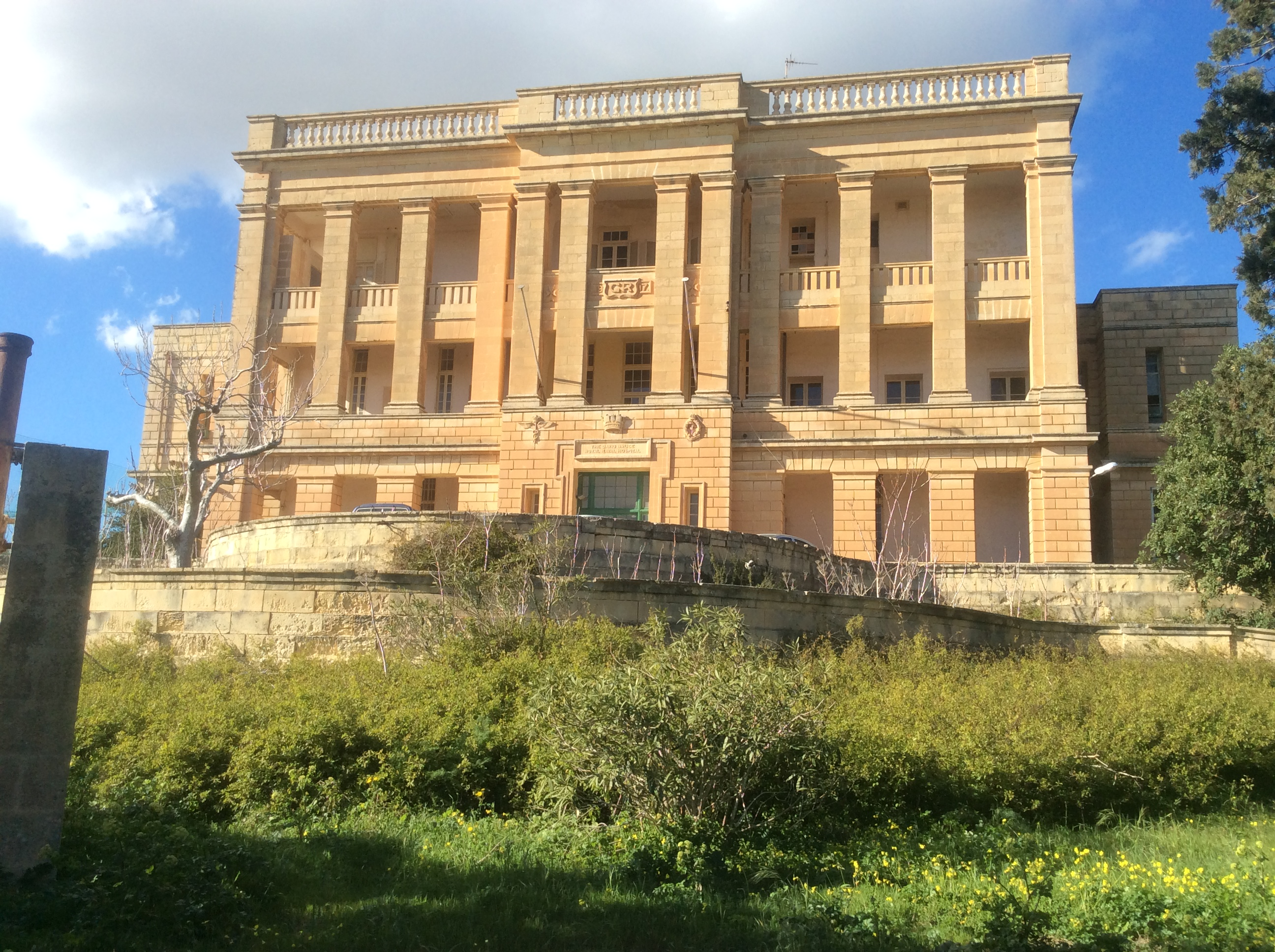
RNH Mtarfa, known as David Bruce Royal Naval Hospital

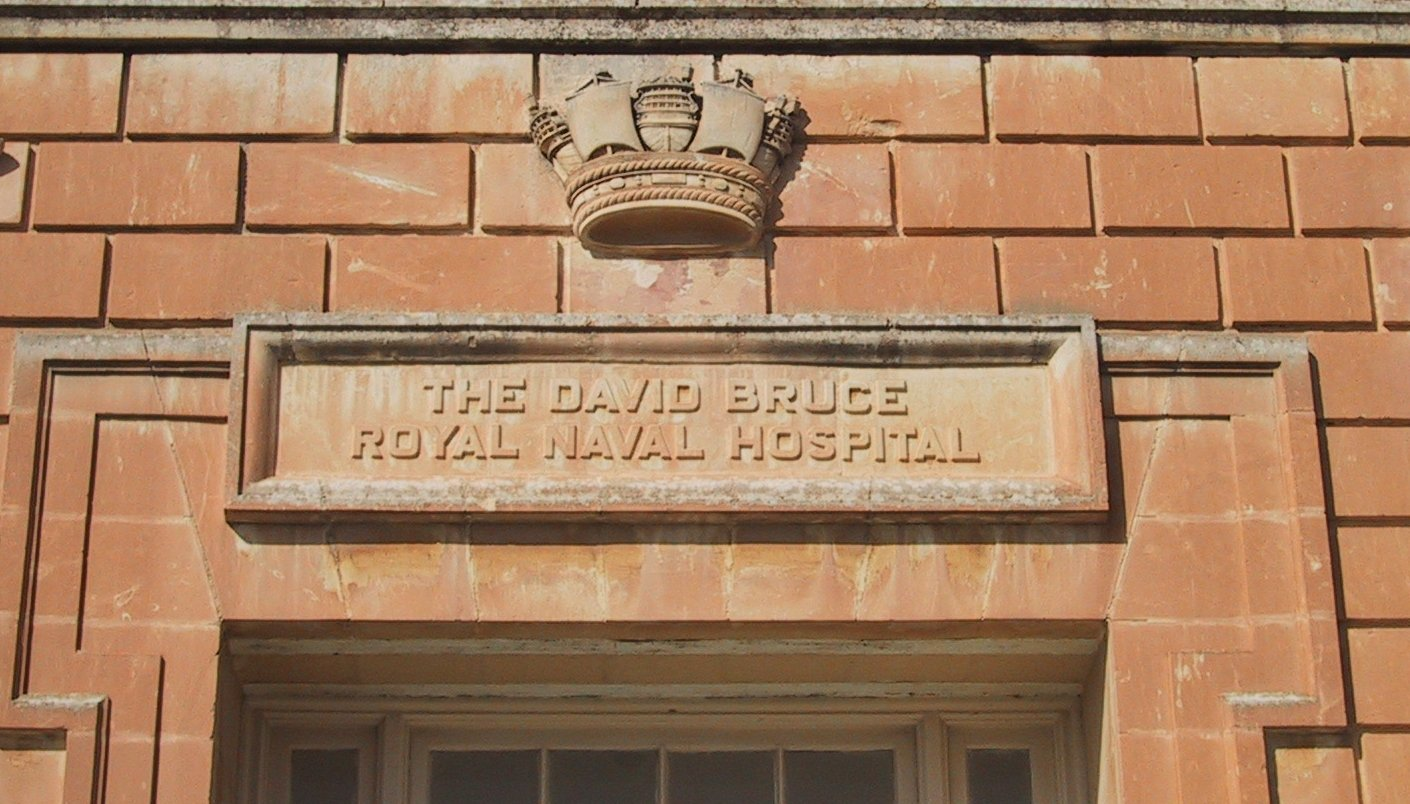
Dedication plaque

The Royal Navy Hospital Mtarfa, also known as David Bruce Royal Naval Hospital, is a former British naval hospital in Mtarfa, Malta.

It was built during World War I and opened soon after the war ended. It was run by the Royal Navy from 1962; prior to this it had been run by the Army as a British Military Hospital. It closed in 1979.

== History ==
On 6 January 1915, Sir Leslie Rundle, Governor and Commander-in-Chief Malta, laid the foundation stone of the new Central Services Hospital. The building was commenced on the assumption that funds would be released to build the ancillary buildings at a later stage. By April 1915, the construction of the main block of the hospital was in hand. By 31 March 1916, the sum of £17,950 had been spent, out of the provisional total of £55,000. It was opened in June 1920 with beds for 6 officers and 190 other ranks.

The new hospital was taken over by 30 Coy RAMC on 23 June 1920. The old Barrack Hospital at Mtarfa, adjacent to Q Block, became a Families' Hospital. The former Families' Hospital moved from Valletta in 1920. The Cottonera Hospital was shut.

In 1941, the hospital took over its war role and changed its name to 90 British General Hospital (90 BGH). It increased its beds from 200 to 2000 beds by taking over the whole of the infantry barracks for hospital wards, and the pitching of tented wards on the football pitch. 90 BGH reverted to 600 beds in late 1944.

On 1 March 1951, the designation of the hospital changed to The David Bruce Military Hospital, after the discoverer of the root cause of brucellosis in 1887 (later traced to goats' milk in 1905 by Sir Themistocles Zammit). In October 1962, the David Bruce Military Hospital was handed over to the Royal Navy Medical Service, Mtarfa became the central services hospital. It was modified and re-opened as the David Bruce Royal Naval Hospital Mtarfa on 2 October 1970 and remained as the only military hospital in Malta until the Royal Navy departed in 1979. It was then converted to a state secondary school named after Sir Temi Zammit, part of St Nicholas College. The school closed and moved to new premises in 2015.

== Present day ==
Since September 2023, the site has been used by Haileybury Malta, an international school.

The hospital is listed on the National Inventory of the Cultural Property of the Maltese Islands.

== See also ==
- List of hospitals and hospital ships of the Royal Navy
