= Tarkio, Missouri =

City in Atchison County, Missouri, United States

- City
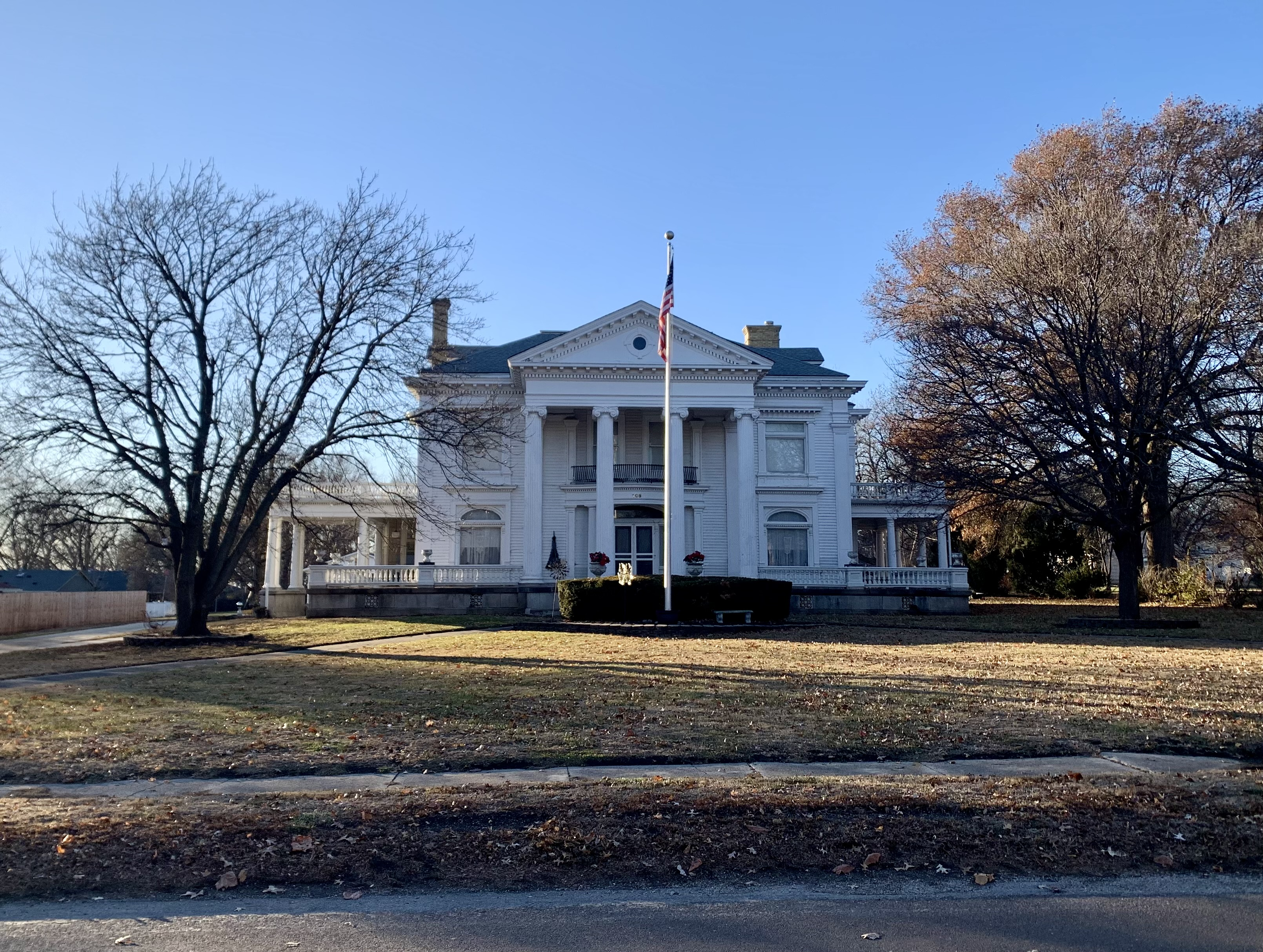
- Mansion in Tarkio

- Location of Tarkio, Missouri
- Coordinates: 40°26′35″N 95°22′58″W
- Country: United States
- State: Missouri
- County: Atchison
- Township: Tarkio

Area
  - Total: 1.39 sq mi (3.59 km^{2})
  - Land: 1.39 sq mi (3.59 km^{2})
  - Water: 0 sq mi (0.00 km^{2})
- Elevation: 997 ft (304 m)

Population (2020)
  - Total: 1,506
  - Density: 1,086.0/sq mi (419.32/km^{2})
- Time zone: UTC−6 (Central (CST))
  - Summer (DST): UTC−5 (CDT)
- ZIP code: 64491
- Area code: 660
- FIPS code: 29-72340
- GNIS feature ID: 2396032
- Website: tarkiomo.com

Tarkio is a city in Tarkio Township, Atchison County, Missouri, United States. The population was 1,506 at the 2020 census. It was platted in 1880 and incorporated in 1881. The name "Tarkio" is derived from the Meskwaki language meaning "place where walnuts grow".

== History ==
Tarkio was laid out by Charles E. Perkins in August 1880, and grew rapidly. By 1900, the U.S. Census shows 2,845 persons living in Tarkio. According to the 1910, 1920, and 1930 census, the number of residents held fairly steady for the next 30 years.

One of the community's most famous landmarks was the Tarkio Mule Barn, an octagonal brick structure built in the early 1890s. It was converted to the Tarkio Mule Barn Theatre which was used by Tarkio College. It was on the National Register of Historic Places, but the building was destroyed in a 1989 fire.

Rankin Hall and the Walnut Inn are listed on the National Register of Historic Places.

== Demographics ==
Historical population
Census	Pop.	Note	%±
1890	1,156		—
1900	1,901		64.4%
1910	1,966		3.4%
1920	1,870		−4.9%
1930	2,016		7.8%
1940	2,114		4.9%
1950	2,221		5.1%
1960	2,160		−2.7%
1970	2,517		16.5%
1980	2,375		−5.6%
1990	2,243		−5.6%
2000	1,935		−13.7%
2010	1,583		−18.2%
2020	1,506		−4.9%
U.S. Decennial Census

=== 2020 census ===
As of the 2020 census, Tarkio had a population of 1,506. The median age was 46.4 years. 21.2% of residents were under the age of 18 and 24.6% of residents were 65 years of age or older. For every 100 females there were 94.1 males, and for every 100 females age 18 and over there were 93.2 males age 18 and over.

0.0% of residents lived in urban areas, while 100.0% lived in rural areas.

There were 675 households in Tarkio, of which 25.9% had children under the age of 18 living in them. Of all households, 44.1% were married-couple households, 22.2% were households with a male householder and no spouse or partner present, and 27.0% were households with a female householder and no spouse or partner present. About 34.5% of all households were made up of individuals and 15.3% had someone living alone who was 65 years of age or older.

There were 788 housing units, of which 14.3% were vacant. The homeowner vacancy rate was 3.5% and the rental vacancy rate was 14.5%.

Racial composition as of the 2020 census
Race	Number	Percent
White	1,441	95.7%
Black or African American	8	0.5%
American Indian and Alaska Native	0	0.0%
Asian	3	0.2%
Native Hawaiian and Other Pacific Islander	0	0.0%
Some other race	10	0.7%
Two or more races	44	2.9%
Hispanic or Latino (of any race)	23	1.5%

=== 2010 census ===
As of the census of 2010, there were 1,583 people, 703 households, and 421 families living in the city. The population density was 1,138.8 inhabitants per square mile (439.7/km^{2}). There were 844 housing units at an average density of 607.2 per square mile (234.4/km^{2}). The racial makeup of the city was 97.9% White, 0.8% African American, 0.4% Native American, 0.4% Asian, 0.1% from other races, and 0.4% from two or more races. Hispanic or Latino of any race were 1.0% of the population.

There were 703 households, of which 25.2% had children under the age of 18 living with them, 46.9% were married couples living together, 8.0% had a female householder with no husband present, 5.0% had a male householder with no wife present, and 40.1% were non-families. 35.4% of all households were made up of individuals, and 17.1% had someone living alone who was 65 years of age or older. The average household size was 2.19 and the average family size was 2.83.

The median age in the city was 45.9 years. 20.6% of residents were under the age of 18; 6.9% were between the ages of 18 and 24; 21% were from 25 to 44; 29.1% were from 45 to 64; and 22.3% were 65 years of age or older. The gender makeup of the city was 48.3% male and 51.7% female.

=== 2000 census ===
As of the census of 2000, there were 1,935 people, 749 households, and 468 families living in the city. The population density was 1,397.9 inhabitants per square mile (539.7/km^{2}). There were 843 housing units at an average density of 609.0 per square mile (235.1/km^{2}). The racial makeup of the city was 92.45% White, 6.30% African American, 0.26% Native American, 0.26% Asian, 0.36% from other races, and 0.36% from two or more races. Hispanic or Latino of any race were 0.78% of the population.

There were 749 households, out of which 27.0% had children under the age of 18 living with them, 48.1% were married couples living together, 10.0% had a female householder with no husband present, and 37.4% were non-families. 33.6% of all households were made up of individuals, and 17.9% had someone living alone who was 65 years of age or older. The average household size was 2.26 and the average family size was 2.87.

In the city the population was spread out, with 29.1% under the age of 18, 7.5% from 18 to 24, 22.9% from 25 to 44, 20.8% from 45 to 64, and 19.6% who were 65 years of age or older. The median age was 38 years. For every 100 females, there were 106.1 males. For every 100 females age 18 and over, there were 86.4 males.

The median income for a household in the city was $28,144, and the median income for a family was $34,625. Males had a median income of $26,900 versus $18,681 for females. The per capita income for the city was $14,160. About 12.4% of families and 16.3% of the population were below the poverty line, including 20.4% of those under age 18 and 15.5% of those age 65 or over.

== Geography ==
According to the United States Census Bureau, the city has a total area of 1.39 square miles (3.60 km^{2}), all land.

=== Climate ===
Climate data for Tarkio, Missouri (1991–2020)
Month	Jan	Feb	Mar	Apr	May	Jun	Jul	Aug	Sep	Oct	Nov	Dec	Year
Mean daily maximum °F (°C)	33.4 (0.8)	37.5 (3.1)	52.0 (11.1)	63.0 (17.2)	72.1 (22.3)	81.6 (27.6)	84.9 (29.4)	84.4 (29.1)	77.8 (25.4)	65.3 (18.5)	50.0 (10.0)	36.7 (2.6)	61.6 (16.4)
Daily mean °F (°C)	24.2 (−4.3)	28.0 (−2.2)	40.6 (4.8)	51.2 (10.7)	61.6 (16.4)	71.8 (22.1)	75.3 (24.1)	73.5 (23.1)	65.7 (18.7)	52.9 (11.6)	39.9 (4.4)	28.2 (−2.1)	51.1 (10.6)
Mean daily minimum °F (°C)	14.9 (−9.5)	18.4 (−7.6)	29.2 (−1.6)	39.3 (4.1)	51.1 (10.6)	62.0 (16.7)	65.7 (18.7)	62.7 (17.1)	53.6 (12.0)	40.4 (4.7)	29.8 (−1.2)	19.7 (−6.8)	40.6 (4.8)
Average precipitation inches (mm)	0.58 (15)	0.99 (25)	2.10 (53)	2.88 (73)	4.72 (120)	4.47 (114)	5.00 (127)	4.15 (105)	3.02 (77)	2.49 (63)	1.89 (48)	1.41 (36)	33.7 (856)
Average snowfall inches (cm)	2.7 (6.9)	4.5 (11)	3.0 (7.6)	0.9 (2.3)	0.0 (0.0)	0.0 (0.0)	0.0 (0.0)	0.0 (0.0)	0.0 (0.0)	0.1 (0.25)	0.8 (2.0)	2.6 (6.6)	14.6 (36.65)
Average extreme snow depth inches (cm)	2 (5.1)	3 (7.6)	2 (5.1)	0 (0)	0 (0)	0 (0)	0 (0)	0 (0)	0 (0)	0 (0)	0 (0)	1 (2.5)	3 (7.6)
Average precipitation days (≥ 0.01 in)	4	4	7	8	10	11	8	7	6	7	5	5	82
Average snowy days (≥ 0.1 in)	2	3	1	0	0	0	0	0	0	0	1	2	9
Source: NOAA(temperatures), (precipitation, snow and days with precip/snow 1979-2008)

== Education ==
It is in the Tarkio R-I School District.

Tarkio was home to Tarkio College, a private Presbyterian college founded in 1883. The college closed in 1991. Starting in 2012 the Alumni Association rented the Campus' Main building, Rankin Hall, and in September 2019, Tarkio College Inc. was issued a Certificate of Operation from the Missouri Department of Higher Education. Operating as Tarkio Technology Institute, TTI offers technical certification courses for professionals in Plumbing, Wind Energy, and Welding.

=== Public library ===
Tarkio Branch Library is a branch of the Atchison County Library.

== Notable people ==
- Music composer Walter Greene (1910–1983), best known for his work at DePatie-Freleng Enterprises (notable works included The Pink Panther Show & The Inspector), was born in Tarkio.
- David Rankin (1825–1910), the so-called "Missouri Corn King", was a resident of Tarkio. Starting with a single ox and plow, Rankin enlarged his farm to over 25,000 acres (101 km^{2}) of land, 12,000 head of cattle, and 25,000 hogs in Northwest Missouri. By using the latest tools and technology, Rankin was able to raise a crop of 1,000,000 bushels of corn in a single year. Rankin Hall, a building on the former Tarkio College campus, was named for the Rankin family.
- U.S. Representative Sam Graves is from Tarkio, as is his brother, Todd Graves, who resigned as U.S. Attorney for the Western District of Missouri in 2006.

== See also ==
- List of cities in Missouri
