= Mule Barn Theatre =

- Formerly listed on the U.S. National Register of Historic Places
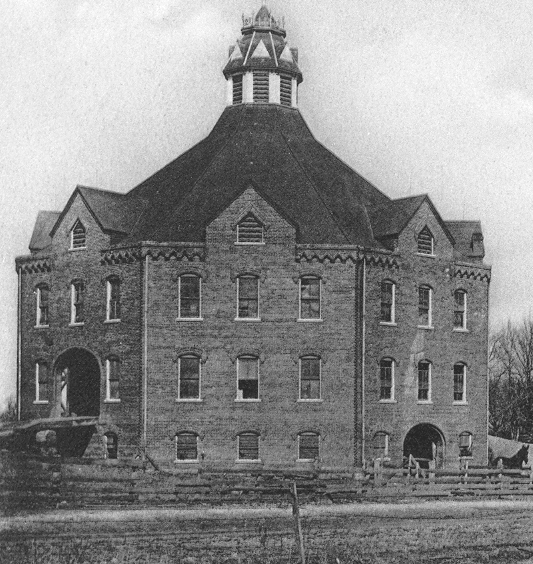
- Mule Barn Theatre from 1904 post card

- Location within Missouri Location within the United States
- Location: 10th and Park Sts., Tarkio, Missouri
- Coordinates: 40°26′42″N 95°23′27″W
- Area: less than one acre
- Built: 1891
- Architect: Searcy & McCutcheon
- Architectural style: Gothic Revival
- NRHP reference No.: 70000321

Significant dates
- Added to NRHP: October 15, 1970
- Removed from NRHP: December 19, 1994

Mule Barn Theatre, also known as the David Rankin Mule Barn, was a historic barn located at Tarkio, Atchison County, Missouri. It was built as a barn about 1891 and converted to a theatre by the former Tarkio College in 1966–1968. It was an octagonal plan, three story, red brick building. It was destroyed in a 1989 fire.

It was listed on the National Register of Historic Places in 1970 and delisted in 1994.
