= St. Oswald's Protestant Episcopal Church =

Historic church in Missouri, United States

- U.S. National Register of Historic Places
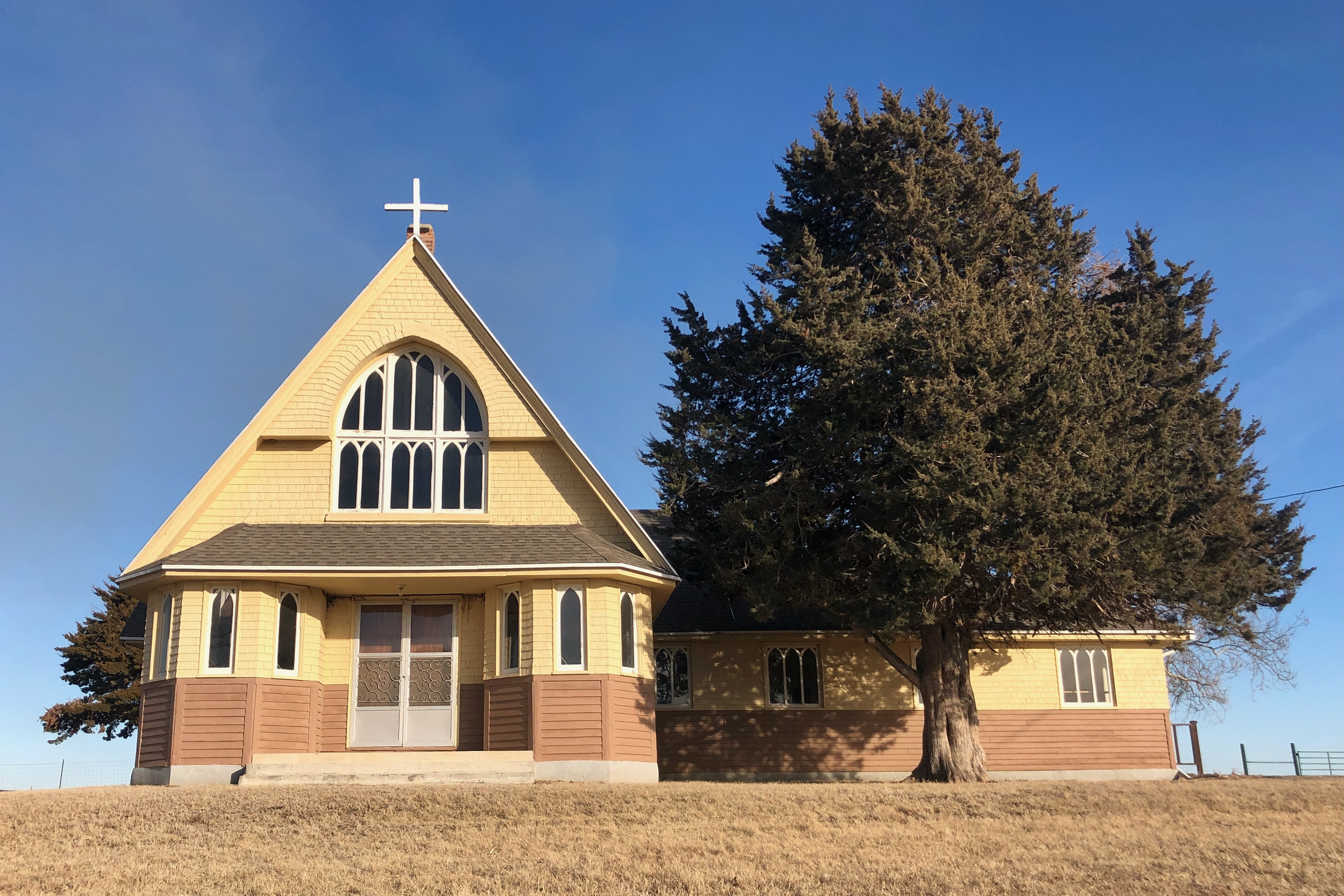

- Location within Missouri Location within the United States
- Location: MO EE S of jct. with Missouri Route 46, near Skidmore, Missouri
- Coordinates: 40°16′39″N 95°14′12″W
- Area: less than one acre
- Built: 1892
- Architect: James, Arthur H.; Yous, W.O.,& Co.
- Architectural style: Shingle Style
- NRHP reference No.: 91001959
- Added to NRHP: January 13, 1992

St. Oswald's Protestant Episcopal Church is a historic Episcopal church located in southeastern Atchison County, Missouri. It is located about eight miles west of Skidmore and ten miles north of Mound City.

It was built in 1892, and is a one-story, cruciform plan, Shingle style building on a brick foundation. It is sheathed in rough-sawn weatherboard and has a gable roof. It was listed on the National Register of Historic Places in 1992.
