= Rock Port, Missouri =

City in Missouri, U.S.

- City
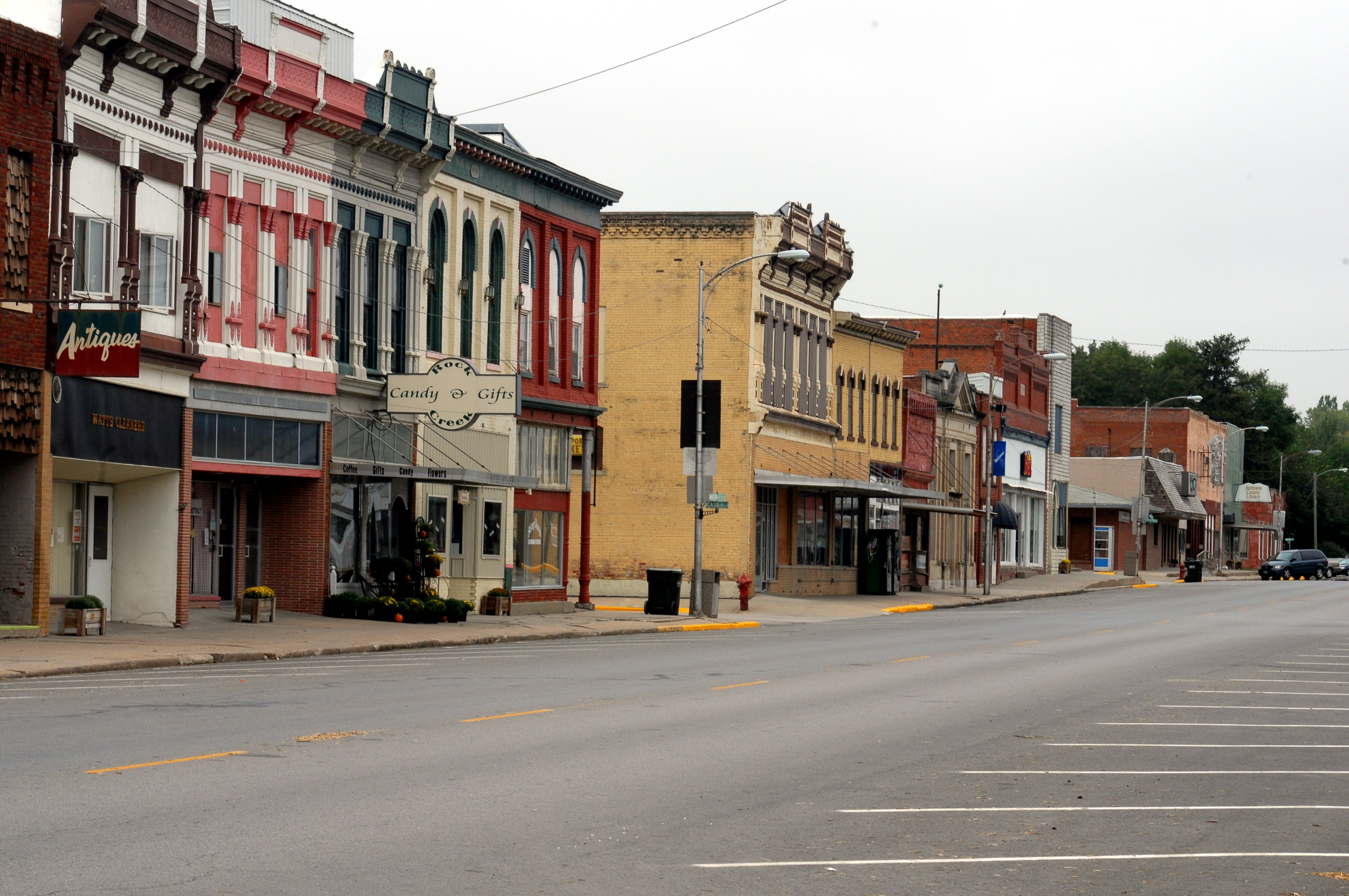
- Main Street between Clay and Cass streets

- Location of Rock Port, Missouri
- Coordinates: 40°24′39″N 95°31′59″W
- Country: United States
- State: Missouri
- County: Atchison
- Township: Clay

Area
  - Total: 2.77 sq mi (7.18 km^{2})
  - Land: 2.77 sq mi (7.18 km^{2})
  - Water: 0 sq mi (0.00 km^{2})
- Elevation: 1,116 ft (340 m)

Population (2020)
  - Total: 1,278
  - Density: 461.2/sq mi (178.08/km^{2})
- Time zone: UTC-6 (Central (CST))
  - Summer (DST): UTC-5 (CDT)
- ZIP code: 64482
- Area code: 660
- FIPS code: 29-62696
- GNIS feature ID: 2396401
- Website: rpmo.com

Rock Port is a city in and the county seat of Atchison County, Missouri, United States. The population was 1,278 at the 2020 census.

== History ==
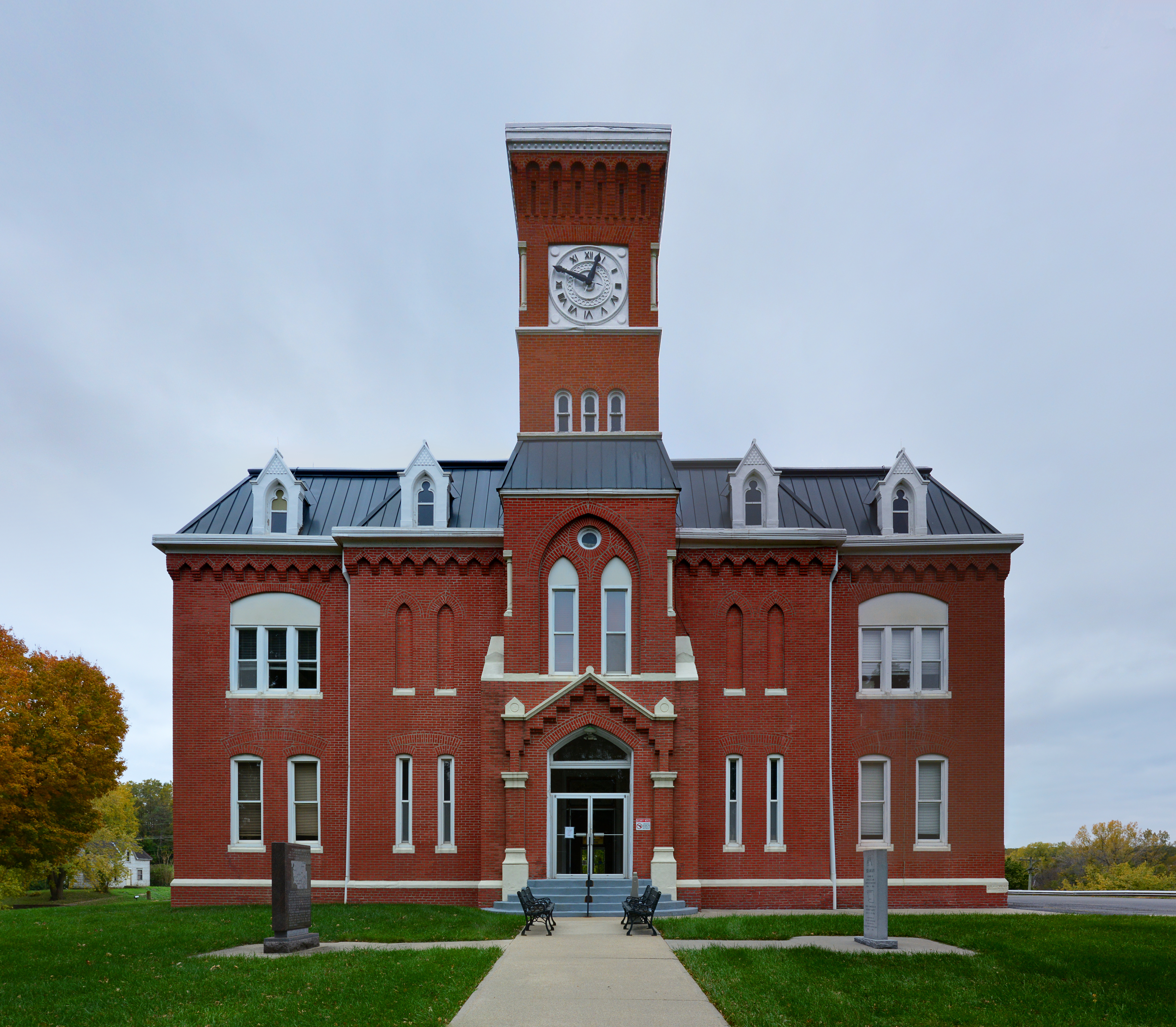
Atchison County courthouse in Rock Port

Rock Port was laid out on April 8, 1851 and incorporated December 13, 1855. The city, which is eight miles east of the Missouri River in the Loess Hills bluffs above the river, derives its name from Rock Creek, which flows through it. Following the Honey War border dispute with Iowa when Missouri's northern border was shifted farther south, the original county seat was moved from Linden to Rock Port.

The original city is located just east of I-29, but there is an additional travel hub closer to the interstate; truck stops, motels, fast food restaurants and fireworks stands host a large number of daytime visitors, despite the city's small size.

The city of Rock Port has become largely energy self-sufficient. In April 2008, Rock Port claimed to be the first community in the United States to have its electricity 100 percent generated by wind power. Rock Port, which uses about 13 million kWh a year, has its power generated by the Loess Hills Wind Farm. The farm has four Suzlon 1.25-megawatt wind turbines. Excess power is sold to the Missouri Public Utility Alliance in Columbia, Missouri. The idea for the wind turbines came from the town's former mortuary worker, Eric Chamberlain. The farm was built by Wind Capital Group and is by far the company's smallest wind farm developed as of January 2009. Wind Capital in 2008 built the bigger 50.4MW Cow Branch Wind Farm between Rock Port and Tarkio.

The Atchison County Memorial Building and John Dickinson Dopf Mansion are listed on the National Register of Historic Places.

== Demographics ==
Historical population
Census	Pop.	Note	%±
1860	305		—
1870	490		60.7%
1880	715		45.9%
1890	934		30.6%
1900	1,080		15.6%
1910	1,053		−2.5%
1920	1,136		7.9%
1930	1,162		2.3%
1940	1,406		21.0%
1950	1,511		7.5%
1960	1,310		−13.3%
1970	1,575		20.2%
1980	1,511		−4.1%
1990	1,438		−4.8%
2000	1,395		−3.0%
2010	1,318		−5.5%
2020	1,278		−3.0%
U.S. Decennial Census

=== 2010 census ===
As of the census of 2010, there were 1,318 people, 588 households, and 356 families living in the city. The population density was 475.8 inhabitants per square mile (183.7/km^{2}). There were 667 housing units at an average density of 240.8 per square mile (93.0/km^{2}). The racial makeup of the city was 98.2% White, 0.3% Native American, 0.1% from other races, and 1.4% from two or more races. Hispanic or Latino of any race were 1.9% of the population.

There were 588 households, of which 26.9% had children under the age of 18 living with them, 46.8% were married couples living together, 9.7% had a female householder with no husband present, 4.1% had a male householder with no wife present, and 39.5% were non-families. 34.7% of all households were made up of individuals, and 16.2% had someone living alone who was 65 years of age or older. The average household size was 2.15 and the average family size was 2.75.

The median age in the city was 46.3 years. 21.4% of residents were under the age of 18; 6.9% were between the ages of 18 and 24; 19.8% were from 25 to 44; 28.8% were from 45 to 64; and 23.1% were 65 years of age or older. The gender makeup of the city was 47.7% male and 52.3% female.

=== 2000 census ===
As of the census of 2000, there were 1,395 people, 647 households, and 368 families living in the city. The population density was 488.5 inhabitants per square mile (188.6/km^{2}). There were 714 housing units at an average density of 250.0 per square mile (96.5/km^{2}). The racial makeup of the city was 99.35% White, 0.07% African American, 0.14% Native American, 0.22% from other races, and 0.22% from two or more races. Hispanic or Latino of any race were 0.50% of the population.

There were 647 households, out of which 23.3% had children under the age of 18 living with them, 49.9% were married couples living together, 4.9% had a female householder with no husband present, and 43.0% were non-families. 40.2% of all households were made up of individuals, and 26.3% had someone living alone who was 65 years of age or older. The average household size was 2.08 and the average family size was 2.79.

In the city the population was spread out, with 20.9% under the age of 18, 5.3% from 18 to 24, 22.7% from 25 to 44, 22.9% from 45 to 64, and 28.2% who were 65 years of age or older. The median age was 46 years. For every 100 females, there were 86.7 males. For every 100 females age 18 and over, there were 81.3 males.

The median income for a household in the city was $28,571, and the median income for a family was $41,625. Males had a median income of $27,639 versus $19,653 for females. The per capita income for the city was $18,322. About 7.2% of families and 11.6% of the population were below the poverty line, including 15.8% of those under age 18 and 12.1% of those age 65 or over.

== Geography ==
Rock Port is located along Rock Creek approximately 2.5 miles east of the Missouri River Valley.

According to the United States Census Bureau, the city has a total area of 2.77 square miles (7.17 km^{2}), all land.

=== Climate ===
Climate data for Rockprt, Missouri(1991-2020 normals)
Month	Jan	Feb	Mar	Apr	May	Jun	Jul	Aug	Sep	Oct	Nov	Dec	Year
Average precipitation inches (mm)	0.74 (19)	1.26 (32)	2.21 (56)	3.42 (87)	4.97 (126)	4.67 (119)	5.16 (131)	3.88 (99)	2.61 (66)	2.77 (70)	1.66 (42)	1.31 (33)	34.66 (880)
Average precipitation days (≥ 0.01 in)	4.5	4.3	6.1	8.8	10.7	9.6	7.5	9.4	6.9	7.2	4.4	4.9	84.3
Source: NOAA

== Education ==
Public education in Rock Port is administered by Rock Port R-II School District.

Rock Port has a public library, the Atchison County Library.

== Transportation ==
Intercity bus service to the city is provided by Jefferson Lines.

== Notable people ==
- Loraine Boettner, American Protestant theologian
- Michael J. Burg (born 1968), actor
- Hardin Cox (1928–2013), politician and businessman

== See also ==
- List of cities in Missouri
