= O Street (disambiguation) =

O Street is a short story collection by Corrina Wycoff.

O Street may also refer to:

- O Street Market, Shaw neighborhood, Washington, D.C.
- O Street Museum Foundation, museum in Washington, D.C.
- The Mansion on O Street, hotel in Washington, D.C.
- O Street, of O Street Viaduct (Omaha, Nebraska)
