= Bloomfield Hills, Michigan =

- City
- City of Bloomfield Hills
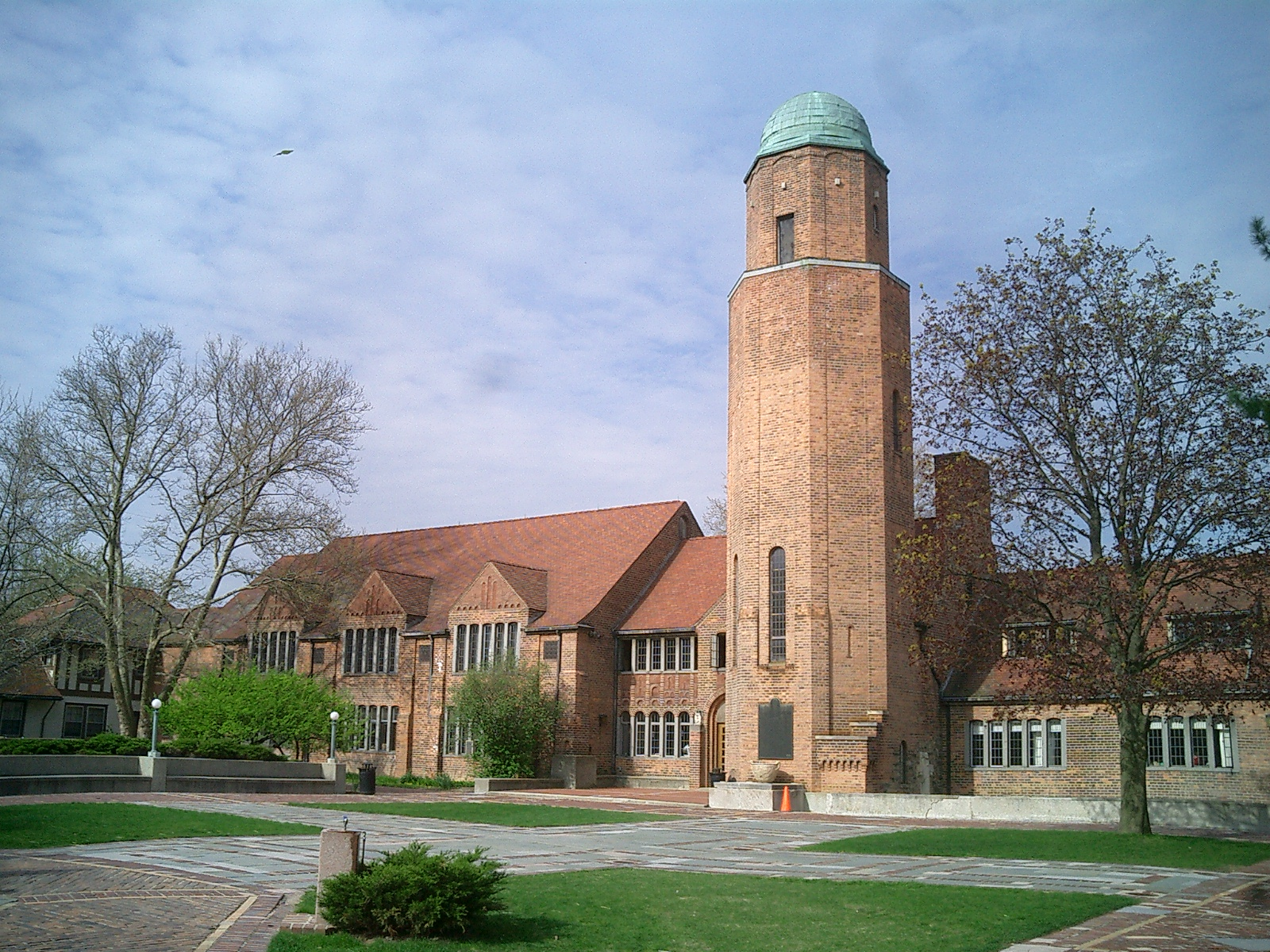
- Cranbrook Educational Community

- Seal

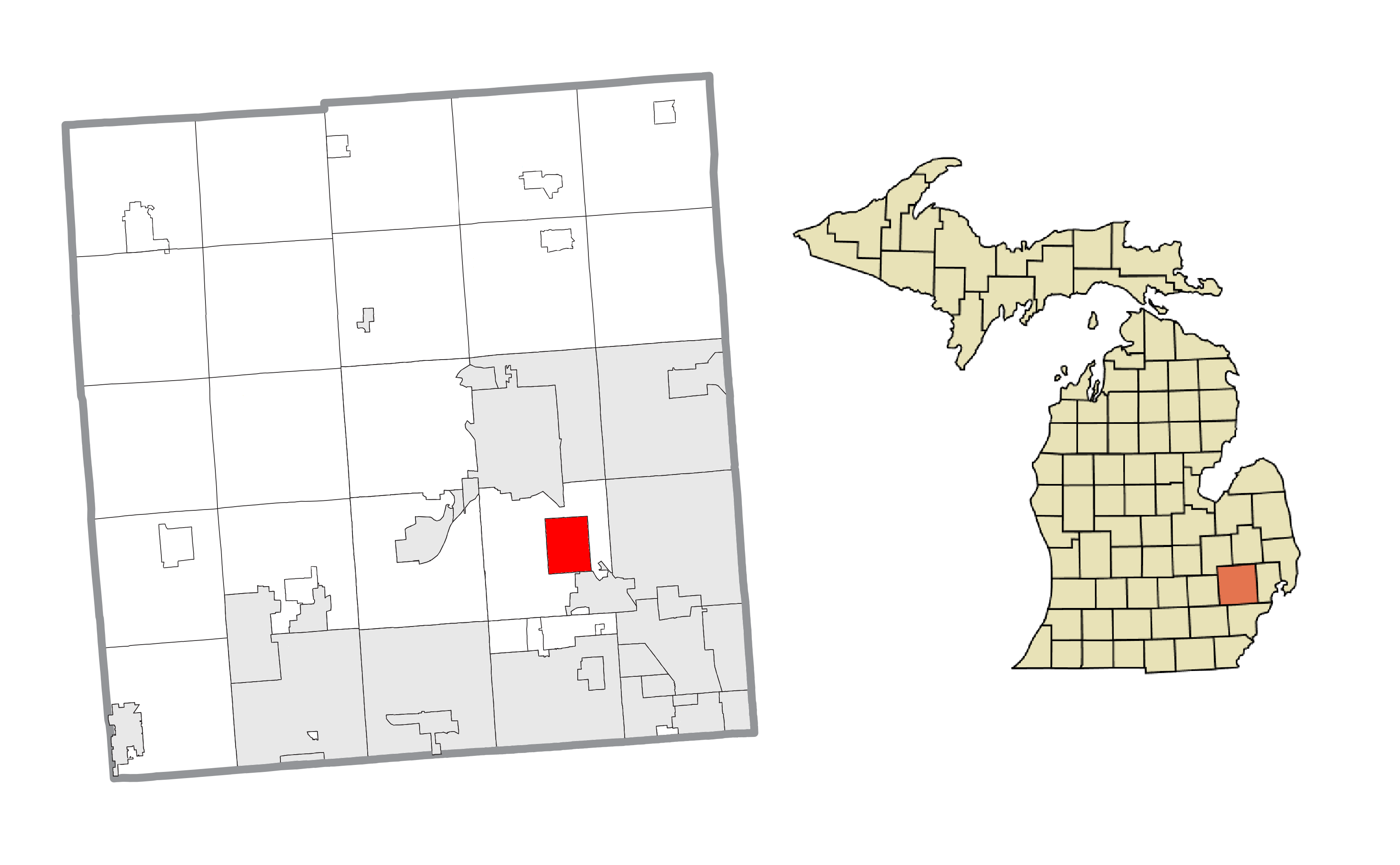
- Location within Oakland County

- Location within the state of Michigan
- Coordinates: 42°35′01″N 83°14′44″W
- Country: United States
- State: Michigan
- County: Oakland
- Incorporated as a village: 1927
- Incorporated as a city: 1932

Government
  - Type: Council–manager
  - Mayor: Lauren Fisher
  - Manager: David Hendrickson

Area
  - City: 5.04 sq mi (13.05 km^{2})
  - Land: 4.96 sq mi (12.84 km^{2})
  - Water: 0.081 sq mi (0.21 km^{2})
- Elevation: 833 ft (254 m)

Population (2020)
  - City: 4,460
  - Density: 899.4/sq mi (347.25/km^{2})
  - Metro: 4,296,250 (Metro Detroit)
- Time zone: UTC-5 (EST)
  - Summer (DST): UTC-4 (EDT)
- ZIP code: 48304
- Area codes: 248 and 947
- FIPS code: 26-09180
- GNIS feature ID: 0621616
- Website: www.bloomfieldhills.gov

Bloomfield Hills is a city in Oakland County in the U.S. state of Michigan. A northern suburb of Detroit on the Woodward Corridor, Bloomfield Hills is located roughly twenty miles (32 km) northwest of downtown Detroit and is surrounded on most sides by Bloomfield Township. As of the 2020 United States census, the city had a population of 4,470.

== History ==
On June 28, 1820, Oakland County was divided into two townships: Pontiac Township and Bloomfield Township, the latter covering the southern part of the county that would include West Bloomfield Township, Royal Oak and Southfield. What is now Bloomfield Hills was a farming area until the turn of the 20th century when wealthy Detroit residents bought up the land. The settlement became a village in 1927, and in 1929 residents voted to become a city to avoid being incorporated into growing Birmingham.

== Culture ==
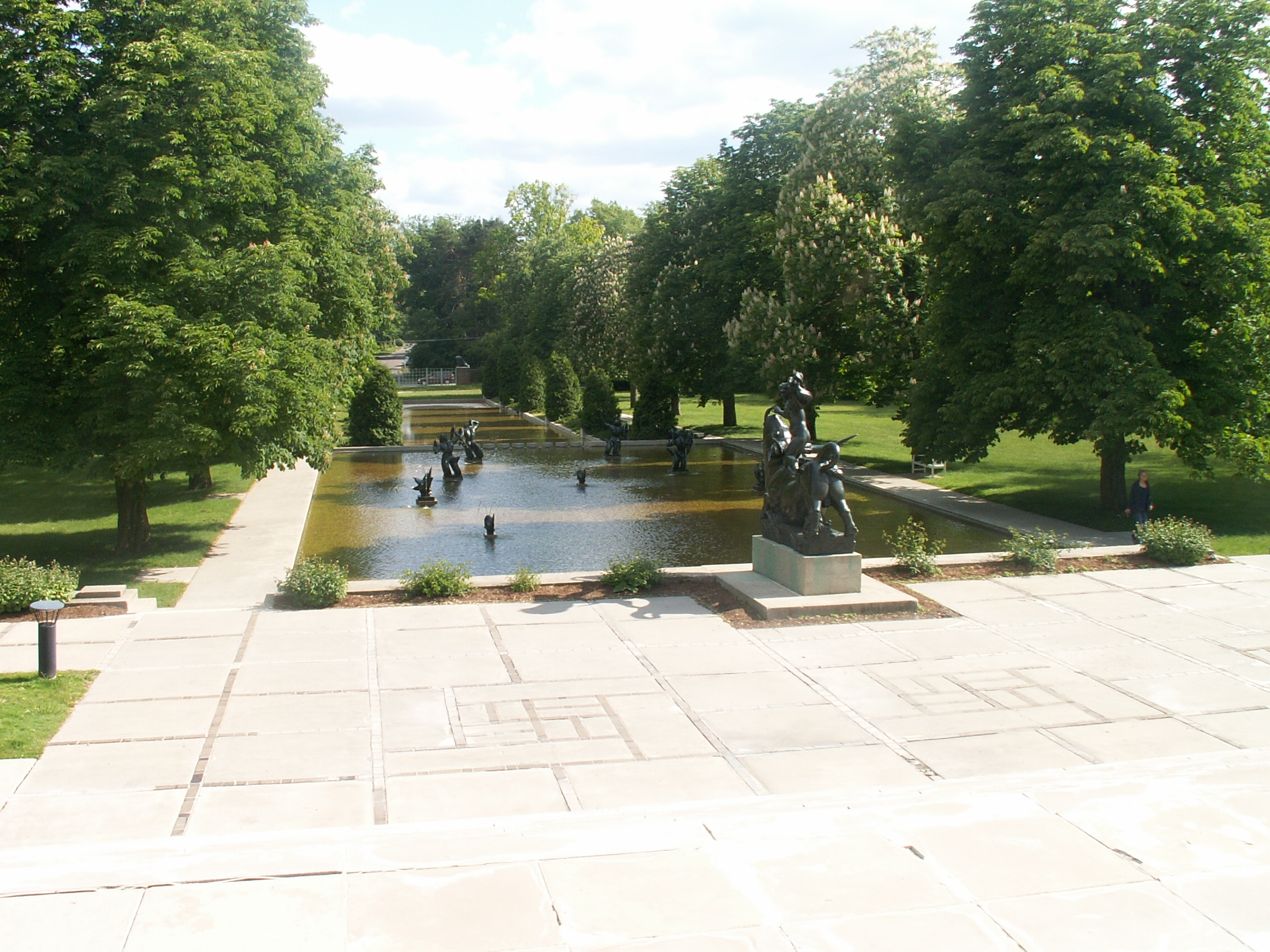
Cranbrook gardens

Bloomfield Hills is the location of the National Historic Landmark Cranbrook Educational Community and other historic sites listed on the national register of historic places.

In popular culture, Bloomfield Hills was the setting for the 2005 film The Upside of Anger. In the 2002 film 8 Mile, Eminem mentions Cranbrook Kingswood while making fun of "Doc" because he attended Cranbrook, which is not considered cool or impressive in the atmosphere portrayed in the film. Bloomfield Hills is the hometown of the comic book character, Trance. Some scenes in Out of Sight with Jennifer Lopez and George Clooney were filmed at a private residence in Bloomfield Hills. (In the novel by Elmore Leonard on which the film is based, the most prominent street in Bloomfield Hills is described as "Vaughan Road, lined with gold.") Jimmy Hoffa was last seen at the former Machus Red Fox restaurant in adjacent Bloomfield Township. The novel Gilda Joyce: The Ladies of the Lake is set in a private school in Bloomfield.

=== Churches ===
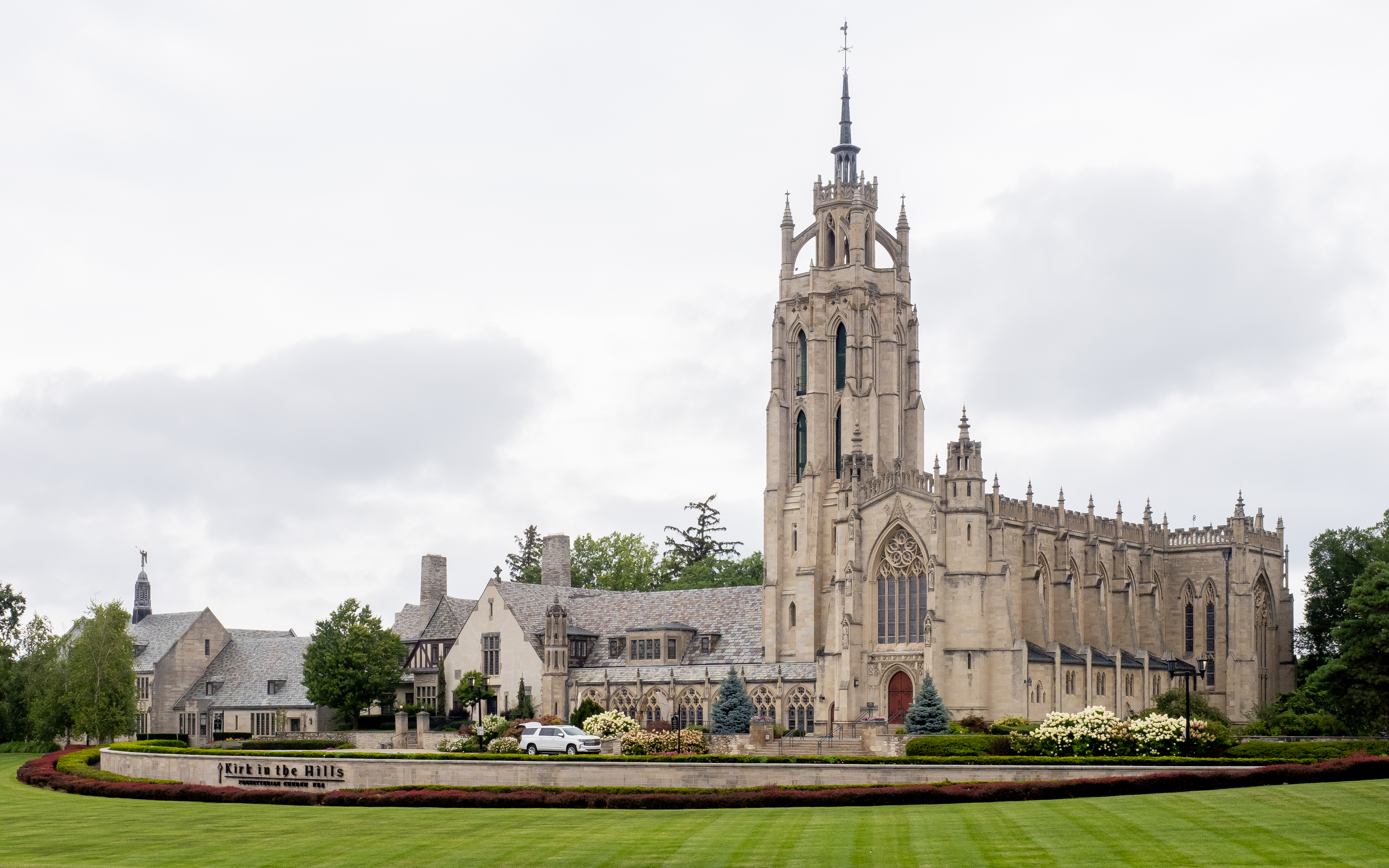
Kirk in the Hills

The area is the home of landmark churches including Kirk in the Hills Presbyterian on Long Lake Rd (Bloomfield Township) and Christ Church Cranbrook Episcopal, consecrated in 1928 as part of George Booth's plan for the Cranbrook Educational Community. The Congregational Church of Birmingham United Church of Christ was founded in Birmingham but moved to its present location in at 1000 Cranbrook Road (at Woodward Avenue) in Bloomfield Hills in 1966. St. Hugo of the Hills Roman Catholic Church was funded by Theodore F. MacManus (1872–1940) and his wife in memory of their deceased children, Hugo and Hubert. St. Hugo of the Hills Catholic Church was built from 1931 to 1936, with approval from Bishop Michael J. Gallagher, and was designed by Arthur DesRossiers. Other churches include St. George Greek Orthodox, Bloomfield Hills Baptist, Beautiful Savior Lutheran Church (ELCA) on Adams Road (Bloomfield Township), Detroit Michigan Temple of the Church of Jesus Christ of Latter-day Saints, and Birmingham Unitarian Church on Woodward Avenue.

== Economy ==
Home of O2 Investment Partners, Straightaway Tire and Auto, Acme Group, consisting of Acme Mills, Great Lakes Filters and Fairway Products are headquartered in Bloomfield Hills. Other companies headquartered in Bloomfield Hills, MI include Taubman Centers, TriMas Corp., Larson Realty Group, Princeton Enterprises, TIP Capital, Bloomfield Hills Bancorp, Reverie, BlackEagle Partners, Gregory J. Schwartz & Co., Inc., Alidade Capital, and Penske Automotive Group.

== Geography ==
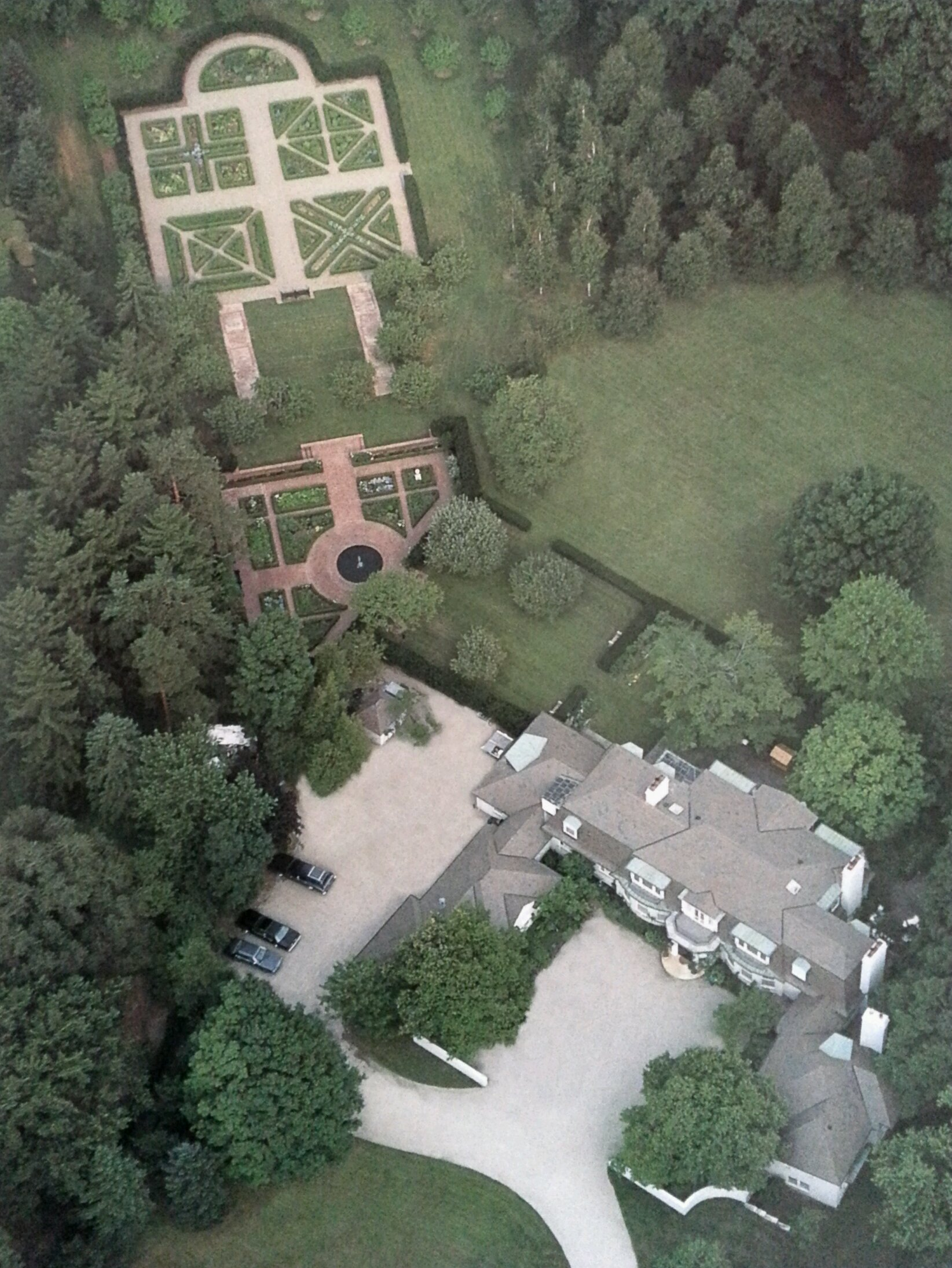
Woodland by Hugh T. Keyes, Bloomfield Hills estate of John Bugas

According to the United States Census Bureau, the city has a total area of 5.04 square miles (13.05 km^{2}), of which 4.96 square miles (12.85 km^{2}) is land and 0.08 square miles (0.21 km^{2}) is water.

== Government ==
=== Federal, state, and county legislators ===
United States House of Representatives
District	Representative	Party	Since
11th	Haley Stevens	Democratic	2019

Michigan Senate
District	Senator	Party	Since
7th	Jeremy Moss	Democratic	2023

Michigan House of Representatives
District	Representative	Party	Since
54th	Donni Steele	Republican	2023

Oakland County Board of Commissioners
District	Commissioner	Party	Since
11	Marcia Gershenson	Democratic	2005

== Demographics ==
Historical population
Census	Pop.	Note	%±
1930	1,127		—
1940	1,281		13.7%
1950	1,468		14.6%
1960	2,378		62.0%
1970	3,672		54.4%
1980	3,985		8.5%
1990	4,288		7.6%
2000	3,940		−8.1%
2010	3,869		−1.8%
2020	4,460		15.3%
U.S. Decennial Census

=== 2020 census ===
As of the 2020 census, Bloomfield Hills had a population of 4,460. The median age was 52.2 years. 19.1% of residents were under the age of 18 and 32.1% of residents were 65 years of age or older. For every 100 females there were 90.8 males, and for every 100 females age 18 and over there were 87.9 males age 18 and over.

100.0% of residents lived in urban areas, while 0.0% lived in rural areas.

There were 1,596 households in Bloomfield Hills, of which 27.3% had children under the age of 18 living in them. Of all households, 63.1% were married-couple households, 13.5% were households with a male householder and no spouse or partner present, and 20.9% were households with a female householder and no spouse or partner present. About 25.2% of all households were made up of individuals and 18.0% had someone living alone who was 65 years of age or older.

There were 1,786 housing units, of which 10.6% were vacant. The homeowner vacancy rate was 2.2% and the rental vacancy rate was 6.5%.

Racial composition as of the 2020 census
Race	Number	Percent
White	3,753	84.1%
Black or African American	147	3.3%
American Indian and Alaska Native	5	0.1%
Asian	366	8.2%
Native Hawaiian and Other Pacific Islander	0	0.0%
Some other race	39	0.9%
Two or more races	150	3.4%
Hispanic or Latino (of any race)	89	2.0%

=== Demographic estimates ===
As of the 2005–2009 American Community Survey 5-Year Estimates, there were about 1,382 families living in the city. The population density was 796.4 inhabitants per square mile (307.5/km^{2}). There were 1,628 housing units at an average density of 329.1 per square mile (127.1/km^{2}).

=== 2010 census ===
As of the census of 2010, there were 3,869 people, 1,489 households, and 1,116 families living in the city. The population density was 780.0 inhabitants per square mile (301.2/km^{2}). There were 1,659 housing units at an average density of 334.5 per square mile (129.2/km^{2}). The racial makeup of the city was 87.3% White, 6.7% Asian, 4.1% African American, 0.1% Native American, 0.3% from other races, and 1.6% from two or more races. Hispanic or Latino of any race were 1.5% of the population.

There were 1,489 households, of which 25.7% had children under the age of 18 living with them, 67.7% were married couples living together, 4.9% had a female householder with no husband present, 2.4% had a male householder with no wife present, and 25.1% were non-families. 21.8% of all households were made up of individuals, and 13% had someone living alone who was 65 years of age or older. The average household size was 2.44 and the average family size was 2.84.

The median age in the city was 54.1 years. 19.9% of residents were under the age of 18; 4.8% were between the ages of 18 and 24; 11.8% were from 25 to 44; 33.5% were from 45 to 64; and 29.7% were 65 years of age or older. The gender makeup of the city was 49.0% male and 51.0% female.

=== 2000 census ===
As of the census of 2000, There were 1,520 households, out of which 26.2% had children under the age of 18 living with them, 71.9% were married couples living together, 3.2% had a female householder with no husband present, and 23.2% were non-families. 21.1% of all households were made up of individuals, and 10.3% had someone living alone who was 65 years of age or older. The average household size was 2.45 and the average family size was 2.84.

In the city, 19.7% of the population was under the age of 18, 3.8% was between 18 and 24, 13.8% between 25 and 44, 39.0% between 45 and 64, and 23.8% were 65 years of age or older. The median age was 52 years. For every 100 females, there were 89.8 males. For every 100 females age 18 and over, there were 85.8 males.

The median income for a household in the city was $170,790, and the median income for a family was over $200,000. Males had a median income of $100,000 versus $52,273 for females. The per capita income for the city was $104,920. About 1.8% of families and 3.8% of the population were below the poverty line, including 5.3% of those under age 18 and 6.4% of those age 65 and over.

Bloomfield Hills is one of the wealthiest cities with over 1000 people in the United States and is one of the wealthiest places in Michigan. 39% of owner-occupied homes had a value of over $1,000,000, and 32.1% with a value between $500,000 and $999,999.

== Education ==
=== Primary and secondary schools ===
==== Public schools ====
Most of the city is served by the Bloomfield Hills School District (BHSD), a public school district based in neighboring Bloomfield Township, comprising the City of Bloomfield Hills, most of Bloomfield Township, and small parts of neighboring communities such as Auburn Hills, Troy, and West Bloomfield Township. The sole district comprehensive high school is Bloomfield Hills High School, formed in 2013 by the mergers of Andover High School and Lahser High School.

The Bloomfield Hills district administers the International Academy, a tuition-free, public consortium high school in Bloomfield Township that hosts students from ten different public schools districts (including some Bloomfield Hills School District students).

A southern portion of Bloomfield Hills resides in the Birmingham City School District.

==== Private schools ====
The Bloomfield Hills area is also home to many private schools. The city limits include the nonsectarian Cranbrook Schools, Cranbrook Academy of Art, St. Hugo of the Hills Catholic School (established in 1940), and the Roeper School.

The neighboring communities of Bloomfield Township and Beverly Hills have two single-sex Catholic schools: Brother Rice High School for boys and Marian High School for girls, as well as the private college-preparatory school Detroit Country Day School, Academy of the Sacred Heart. Bloomfield Township also has Michigan's only ACCS accredited Classical Christian school, Bloomfield Christian School.

==== Weekend education ====
After the Japanese School of Detroit was formed in 1973, it initially held its classes at Cranbrook School Brookside.

=== Post-secondary education ===
Bloomfield Hills is home to the Cranbrook Academy of Art, one of the nation's leading graduate schools of architecture, art and design. It was founded by the Booths in 1932. By 1984, the New York Times would say that "the effect of Cranbrook and its graduates and faculty on the physical environment of this country has been profound ... Cranbrook, surely more than any other institution, has a right to think of itself as synonymous with contemporary American design."

The main offices of Oakland Community College are in Bloomfield Hills.

== See also ==
- Oakland Hills Country Club
- Michigan locations by per capita income
- Woodward Corridor
