= KMA =

KMA could refer to the following:

== Geographical regions ==
- Kanpur metropolitan area, India
- Kolkata Metropolitan Area, India
- Kyiv metropolitan area, Ukraine

== Media ==
- KMA-FM, a radio station (99.1 FM) licensed to Clarinda, Iowa, United States
- KMA (AM), a radio station (960 AM) licensed to Shenandoah, Iowa, United States
- KMA (art), a collaboration between media artists Kit Monkman and Tom Wexler

== Organisations ==
- Kent Miners' Association
- Kerala Mathematical Association, Kerala, India
- Knoxville Museum of Art in Knoxville, Tennessee
- Koninklijke Militaire Academie, the Royal Dutch Military Academy
- the Korea Meteorological Administration, South Korea
- the Korea Medical Association, South Korea
- Korea Military Academy, South Korea
- Kumasi Metropolitan Assembly

== Other uses ==
- KMA, IATA airport code of Kerema Airport in Papua New Guinea
- Korean martial arts
- Kursk Magnetic Anomaly
