= Jessie Young =

American radio commentator (1900–1987)

- Born: Jessie Susanka; February 7, 1900; Wahoo, Nebraska, U.S.
- Died: September 12, 1987 (aged 87); Fort Collins, Colorado, U.S.
- Spouse: Floyd S. Young (1918–1966; his death)

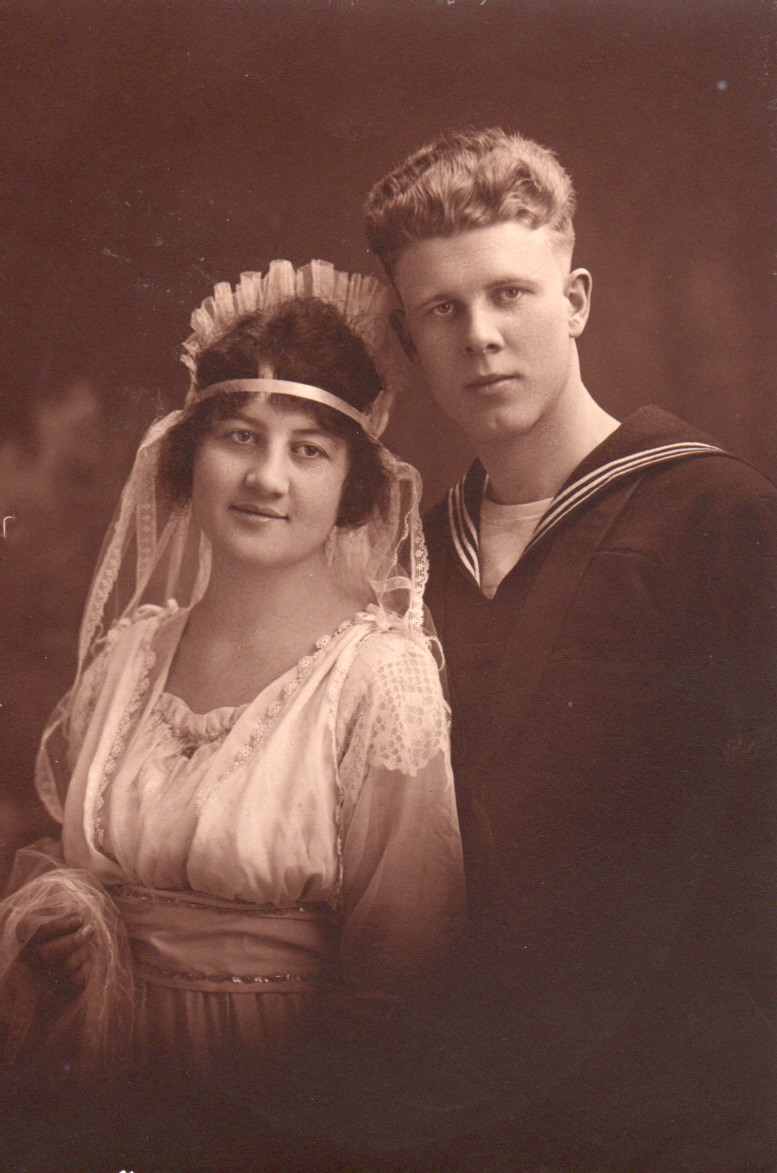

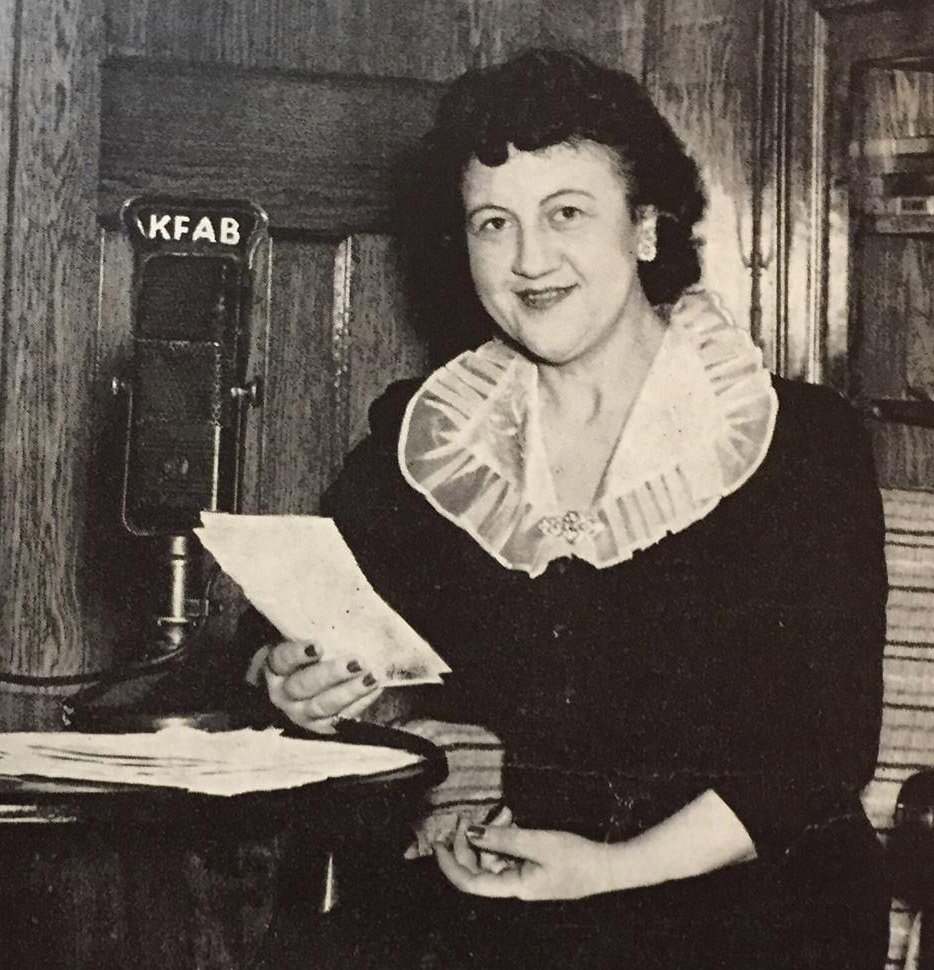
Jessie Young as Radio Host

Jessie Young (born Jessie Susanka; February 7, 1900 – September 12, 1987) was an American radio commentator and magazine publisher, widely acknowledged as the first of the radio homemakers.

== Early life and career ==
Born in Wahoo, Nebraska, Young grew up in Essex, Iowa, the youngest of four daughters born to John Susanka and Rosa Cuhel. She attended Penn School of Commerce in Oskaloosa, Iowa.

In 1926, after the bank at which she had been employed as head bookkeeper for several years failed, Young began working at KMA-AM in Shenandoah. Hired initially as a singer, she had, by year's end, become the host of a new program, The Stitch and Chat Club, later renamed Jesse's Homemaker Visit. Described by food writers Jane and Michael Stern as "the archetype of the radio homemaker show," the program not only covered "the niceties of housekeeping," but "also created an easygoing radio companion listeners could depend on every day." As fellow radio homemaker/author Evelyn Birkby acknowledged in 1985:

Jessie was the first. The first to become a longterm KMA homemaker. The first to broadcast directly from her home. The first of the KMA women broadcasters to share her experience, her housekeeping, sewing and cooking expertise with her listeners in depth and in detail for many years...

In May 1936, Young was elected president of the Iowa Federation of Business and Professional Women's Clubs, having served the previous two years as recording secretary. Later that year, Young used her platform to stress the importance of women exercising their hard-won franchise in the upcoming presidential election.

Perhaps it is a sentimental reason, but women especially should vote because for a century they demanded they be allowed to do so. A great price was paid to secure our right of suffrage and that should not go unheeded. There are additional reasons why women should vote. They are the guardians of human welfare, they bear and train the young, their interest is primarily in persons rather than things. It is short-sighted for them to content themselves with wishful thinking.

On June 1, 1942, Young became the first host of WFIL's Kitchen Club in Philadelphia. The following year she and her family moved to Nebraska (first Lincoln and later Greeley), from whence Young broadcast her program for approximately twelve years, initially on KFAB and, beginning in 1950, on KLMS.

From 1946 through 1980, Young published the magazine Jessie's Homemaker Radio Visit, which, as of 1971, had approximately 10,000 subscribers scattered across all 50 states, as well as Puerto Rico and Canada.

== Personal life and death ==
From 1918 until his death in 1966, Young was married to Floyd S. Young, with whom she had four children, one adopted.

In June 1987, Young had a stroke from which she never recovered, dying on September 12, 1987, in Fort Collins, Colorado.
