= The Mansion on O Street =

Hotel in Washington D.C., United States

Coordinates: 38.9083°N 77.0459°W

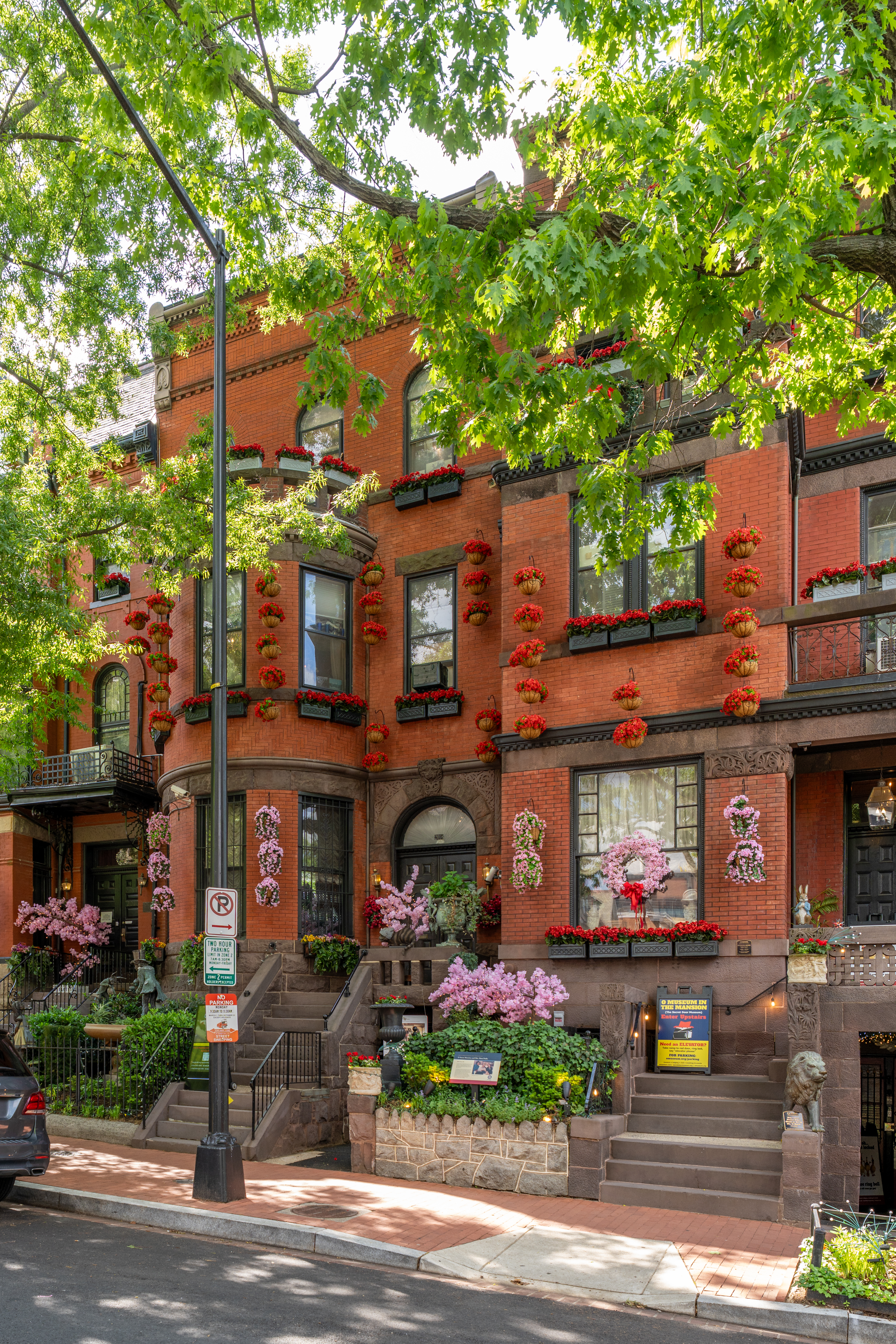
- The mansion in 2026
- Interactive map of the The Mansion on O Street area

General information
- Location: Washington, D.C., U.S., 2020 O Street N.W.
- Opening: February 14, 1980
- Owner: H.H. Leonards

Technical details
- Floor count: 4
- Floor area: 30,000 sq ft (2,800 m^{2})

Design and construction
- Architect: Edward Clark (original - 1892)

Other information
- Number of rooms: various
- Number of restaurants: various

Website
- www.omansion.com

The Mansion on O Street is an American luxury boutique hotel in the Dupont Circle historic district of Washington D.C. The hotel is noted for eccentric interior styling which includes hidden doors, secret passages, and rooms in which all furnishings and fixtures are for sale. The four-story building contains guest rooms, a private Social club, the O Street Museum Foundation and a conference center.

== History ==
The building was originally designed in 1892 by Edward Clark, at that time the Architect of the Capitol, as a cluster of three row houses for himself and family members including his brother Champ Clark, another brother known as "the artist" and a sister. The residences were connected through the basements and main floors and contained separate sleeping quarters upstairs.

On February 14, 1980, H.H. Leonards purchased 2020 O Street, the first row house in the series of connected brownstones. Leonards renovated the townhouse as a bed-and-breakfast and private club. After renovations were completed, Leonards designed and built a new brownstone on the adjacent vacant lot at 2022 O Street. In 1990, the buildings became administered under the not-for-profit membership association of H.H. Leonards Associates (HHLA). Leonards subsequently acquired three adjacent row houses, each incorporated into the single property: Number 2018 in 1991, Number 2016 in 1992 and Number 2024 in 1994.

In 1998 Leonards opened the O Street Museum inside the facility. The museum includes art, sculpture, music, memorabilia and written manuscripts in the collection. The museum hosts concerts, book signing talks, film screenings and tours throughout the year.

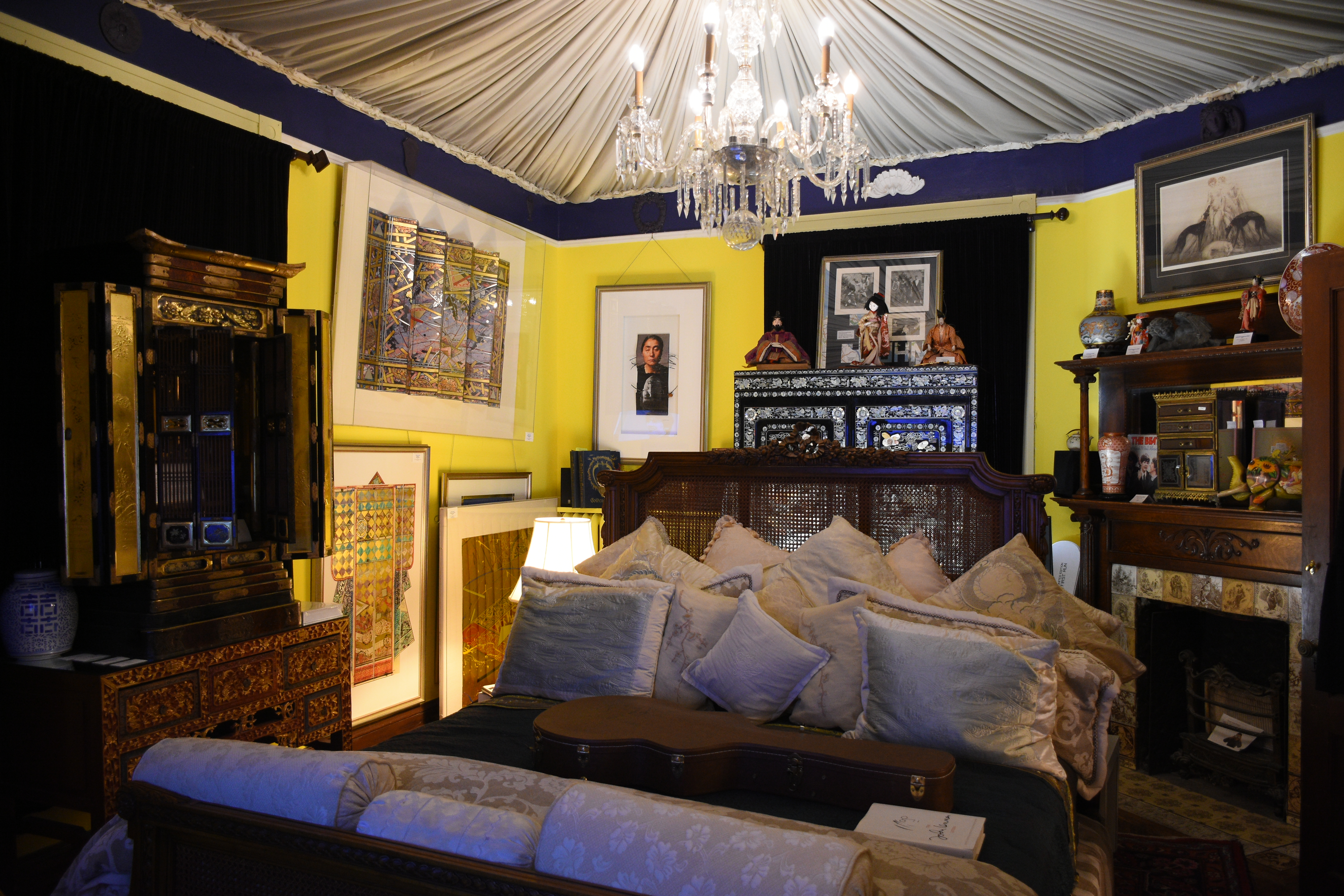
The Beatles Room

The interior design of the Mansion on O Street became noted for unique and eccentric styling of various architectural, artistic and design periods. It incorporates maze-like passageways, hidden doors and secret rooms. The unique decor has been chronicled in books including Four Blind Mice by James Patterson, Afterburn by Zane, How to Murder Your Life by Cat Marnell, and in the young adult novel Gilda Joyce: The Dead Drop by Jennifer Allison.

All the furnishings, fixtures and decorative items within the rooms can be purchased. The hotel subsequently developed a reputation for privacy, exclusivity and a high-profile clientele that has included authors, artists, musicians, Ambassadors, Presidents, and civil rights heroine Rosa Parks.

In May 2019, The Mansion on O Street was added to the DC Preservation League's African American Heritage Trail for its role as a DC accommodation for Rosa Parks, which began after it provided a refuge for Mrs. Parks when she was assaulted in her Detroit home in August 1994. This addition was marked with a plaque unveiled by Washington, DC Mayor Muriel Bowser.

== Facilities ==
The Mansion on O Street is housed in a historic building, incorporating 30,000 square feet (2,800 m^{2}) into 100 rooms. It includes 6 main kitchens, 12 conference rooms, and 30 special event galleries. Rooms, suites and residences have varied theme, including a two-story log cabin, a safari room and an art deco penthouse. A conference center is used for corporate events, off-site meetings, corporate retreats, engagements, weddings, parties and fundraisers. The footprint includes large and small meeting galleries that can hold up to 200 guests.

== Business model ==
Divided into for-profit and non-profit arms, The Mansion has a unique business model as noted in PSFK “The Mansion on O Street represents a future business paradigm - one in which there is maximum utility in every product, service, or idea that is sold.”

Nearly everything in The Mansion is for sale (except the signature guitars). For day-to-day operations they rely on volunteers as well as a handful of employees.

== Philanthropy ==
The hotel has provided support for charities including the American Forest Foundation, Habitat for Humanity, Rosa and Raymond Parks Institute for Self Development, and the American Red Cross.
