= Gilda Joyce: The Dead Drop =

2009 book by Jennifer Allison

- Author: Jennifer Allison
- Language: English
- Series: Gilda Joyce
- Genre: Young adult fiction, Fantasy
- Set in: Washington, D.C.
- Publisher: Dutton Children's Books
- Publication date: May 14, 2009
- Publication place: United States
- ISBN: 9780525479802
- Preceded by: Gilda Joyce: The Ghost Sonata
- Followed by: Gilda Joyce: The Bones of the Holy

Gilda Joyce: The Dead Drop is the fourth book of the Gilda Joyce series by American author Jennifer Allison. It was first published in 2009.

The novel is set Washington, D.C., with Gilda taking a summer internship at the International Spy Museum. Gilda's skills as a psychic spy lead her to two discoveries: a ghost in the museum and a packet of classified information in the cemetery. While she is running between her job, her new apartment, and family, she finds a dead drop message that might not be as safe as her recent investigations. Jennifer Allison has also written: Gilda Joyce: Psychic Investigator, Gilda Joyce: The Ladies of the Lake, Gilda Joyce: The Ghost Sonata, and Gilda Joyce: The Bones of the Holy.
