= Driftmier =

Driftmier is a surname. Notable people with the surname include:

- John Driftmier (1982–2013), Canadian documentary filmmaker
- Leanna Field Driftmier (1886–1976), American radio personality and writer
