= Daughter-sister =

Daughter-sister may refer to:

- Sister-daughter, an archaic term for niece.
- The Daughters Sisters Project, a non-profit organization.
