= O Street Museum Foundation =

Art Museum in Washington D.C.

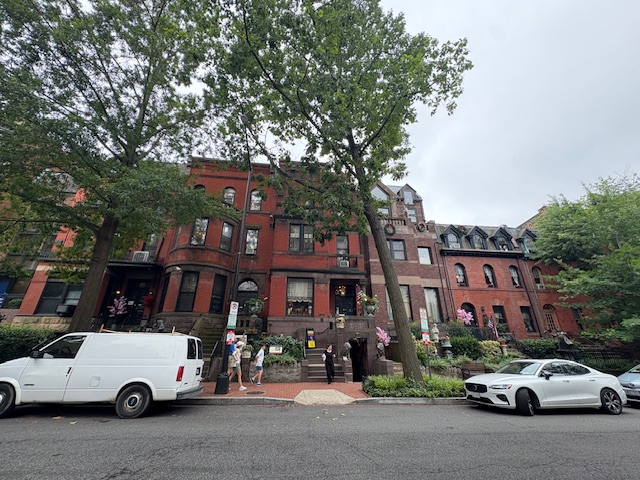

- Location within Washington, D.C.
- Established: April 24, 1998
- Location: 2020 O Street Northwest; Washington, D.C. U.S.
- Coordinates: 38.9083°N 77.0459°W
- Public transit access: Dupont Circle
- Website: www.omuseum.org

The O Street Museum Foundation is an independent nonprofit museum located within The Mansion on O Street in Washington, D.C. The O Street Museum Foundation is housed in five interconnected town houses that include over 100 rooms and 80 secret doors.

== Collection ==
The collection contains 15,000 pieces of art, 20,000 books, architecture, manuscripts, music, and memorabilia. The museum includes unique music, manuscripts, rare books, art and sculpture, and different architectural styles.

The museum houses both permanent and rotating exhibits. Pieces represented in the collection are works by sculptors such as Frederic Hart and Frederic Remington, paintings by Kurt Wenner, architecture by Edward Clark, signed scripts of the Academy Award winning trilogy Lord of the Rings, letters and drawings by John Lennon which were featured in the book, The John Lennon Letters by Hunter Davies, and 60 signed Gibson guitars. The signed guitar collection includes guitars from Les Paul, The Eagles, Bob Dylan, Bruce Springsteen and the E Street Band, Arlo Guthrie, Emmylou Harris, Paul Williams, The Rolling Stones, U2, Sean Lennon, and JD Souther.

Several exhibits are on rotation at the museum including Women Who Rock by Gerald Johnson, Rhythmic Rebels by photographer Sandrine Lee, and Faces of Hope, a photography retrospective of Afghanistan, Pakistan, and Darfur by Chip Duncan. Faces of Hope debuted at The 2011 World Peace Festival and is featured in the book, Enough to Go Around—Searching for Hope in Afghanistan, Pakistan & Darfur.

== Building history ==
Designed in 1892 by the architect who was one of the designers of the Capitol after Thomas Walter's resignation (from 1865 to 1902), Edward Clark. The building served as a home for himself, Champ Clark (Speaker of the House from 1911-1919), a brother known only as "the artist", and a sister.

Originally spanning three row houses, the residence was connected through the basement and main floor and contained separate sleeping quarters for each brother upstairs. It has been suggested that Clark incorporated leftover tiles and wood from the Capitol into his new home.

In the 1930s the home was converted into three separate rooming houses for FBI Director, J. Edgar Hoover's G-men.

On February 14, 1980, H.H. Leonards purchased 2020 O Street, the first row house in the series of connected brownstones. Leonards renovated the townhouse as a bed-and-breakfast and private club. After renovations were completed, Leonards designed and built a new brownstone on the adjacent vacant lot at 2022 O Street. Leonards subsequently acquired three adjacent row houses, each incorporated into the single property.

In 1998, Leonards opened the O Street Museum inside The Mansion on O Street. The museum includes art, sculpture, music, memorabilia and written manuscripts in the collection. The museum hosts concerts, book signing talks, film screenings and tours throughout the year.

Today, the property consists of more than 100 rooms of varying architectural, artistic and design periods with hand-painted ceilings, original Tiffany stained glass windows, a two-story Log Cabin, and an Art Deco penthouse. The unique décor and architecture of the building has been chronicled in books including Four Blind Mice by James Patterson, Afterburn by Zane and in the young adult series Gilda Joyce: The Dead Drop by Jennifer Allison.

== Public programs ==
O Street Museum hosts educational programs for all age groups to learn about and participate in the creative process. Programs include artist-in-residence programs, jammin’ (live music collaboration), songwriters’ workshops, book signings, film screenings and live performances from artists of diverse genres including; Emmylou Harris, Los Texmaniacs, Esperanza Spalding, and Jason Isbell.

=== Past Artists-in-Residence ===
- Ying Ming Tu is a visual artist who focuses on painting, documentary film making, and photography. After serving in the Taiwan military as a bodyguard to Chiang Kai-shek, Tu entered National Taiwan University and earned a BA degree in history. In early 80's, he came to the US to study film and television at UCLA, where he earned his MFA degree. His Mickey Mao series has shown in Taipei, Los Angeles and Belgium, and was well received by the public and critics alike.
- Linda Wolf is an internationally recognized photographer and author. She is the co-author of: Daughters of the Moon, Sisters of the Sun, which won the Athena Award for Excellence in Mentoring; Global Uprising: Confronting the Tyrannies of the 21st Century; and Speaking & Listening From the Heart. Wolf is the founder and executive director of Teen Talking Circles (originally the Daughters Sisters Project), and through Teen Talking is a pioneer in the revival of the modern Talking Circle therapeutic movement. In 2006, through Teen Talking Circles, she became the recipient of a seven-year AnJeL Fund Grant from the Rudolph Steiner Foundation.

== Volunteers ==
The O Street Museum Foundation is tax-exempt under section 501(c)(3) of the Internal Revenue Code, and it is a private operating foundation under section 4942(j)(3). It operates without any paid employees or paid board members; all contributors are volunteers.

== Hours of operation ==
The museum is located at 2020 O Street NW, between 20th and 21st streets, in Washington, D.C. The museum is less than a block from the south exit of the Dupont Circle station on the Red Line.

The museum is open daily from 9:00 am to 9:00 pm Tuesday-Saturday, and 9:00am to 6:00pm Sunday and Monday. Online reservations are encouraged.

== See also ==
- List of music museums
