= Essex, Iowa =

- City
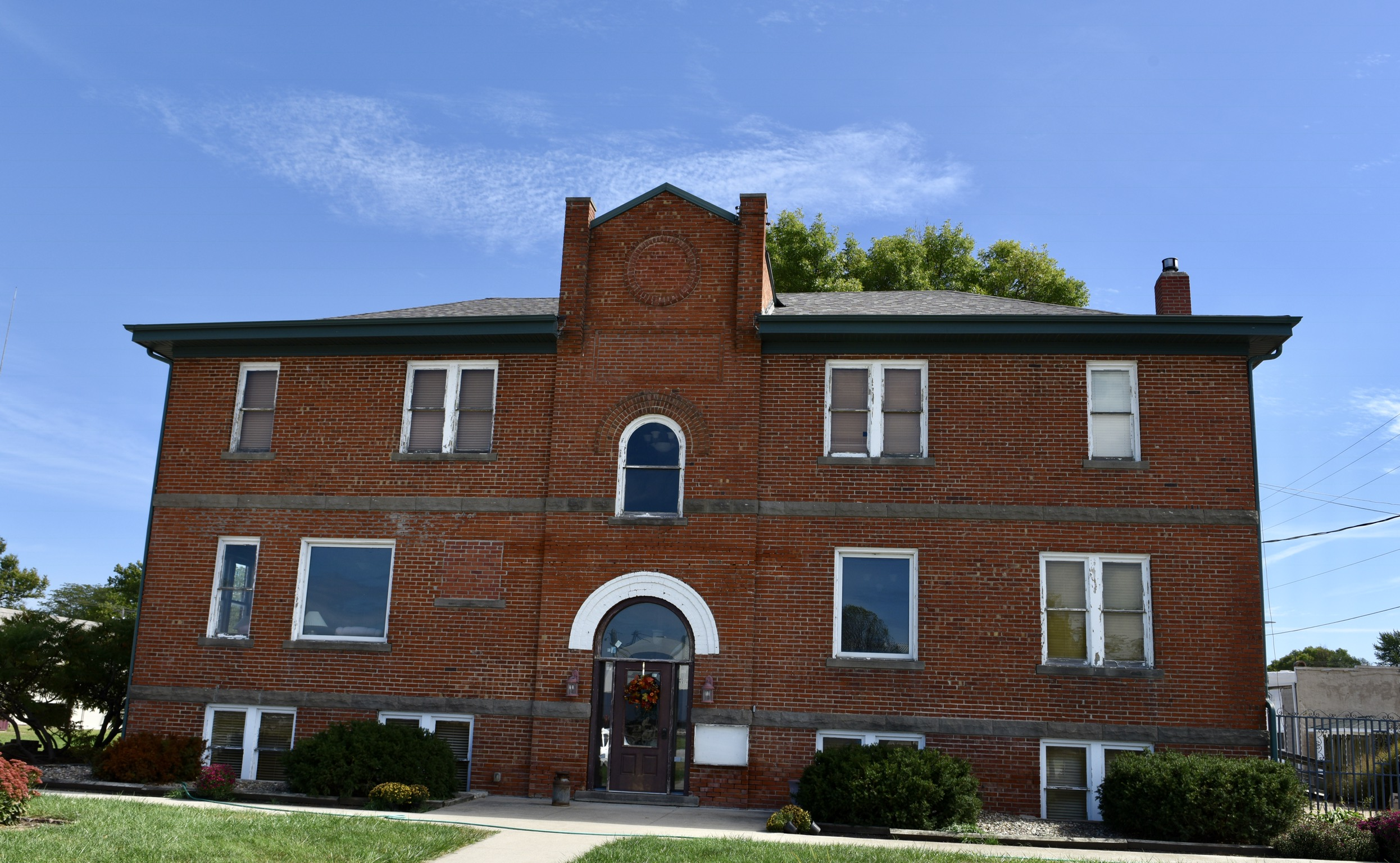
- Iowan's Hotel

- Location of Essex, Iowa
- Coordinates: 40°49′58″N 95°18′14″W
- Country: USA
- State: Iowa
- County: Page

Area
  - Total: 1.51 sq mi (3.90 km^{2})
  - Land: 1.51 sq mi (3.90 km^{2})
  - Water: 0 sq mi (0.00 km^{2})
- Elevation: 994 ft (303 m)

Population (2020)
  - Total: 722
  - Density: 480.0/sq mi (185.31/km^{2})
- Time zone: UTC-6 (Central (CST))
  - Summer (DST): UTC-5 (CDT)
- ZIP code: 51638
- Area code: 712
- FIPS code: 19-25815
- GNIS feature ID: 2394702
- Website: www.essexia.net

Essex is a city in Page County, Iowa, United States. The population was 722 in the 2020 census, a decline from the 884 population in 2000.

== History ==
Essex was platted in 1870 in Pierce Township. The Chicago, Burlington and Quincy Railroad arrived in Essex in 1871.

== Geography ==
Essex is located near the East Nishnabotna River.

According to the United States Census Bureau, the city has a total area of 1.51 square miles (3.91 km^{2}), all land.

== Demographics ==
Historical population
| Census | Pop. | Note | %± |
|---|---|---|---|
| 1880 | 617 | | — |
| 1890 | 564 | | −8.6% |
| 1900 | 710 | | 25.9% |
| 1910 | 776 | | 9.3% |
| 1920 | 727 | | −6.3% |
| 1930 | 806 | | 10.9% |
| 1940 | 762 | | −5.5% |
| 1950 | 763 | | 0.1% |
| 1960 | 767 | | 0.5% |
| 1970 | 770 | | 0.4% |
| 1980 | 1,001 | | 30.0% |
| 1990 | 916 | | −8.5% |
| 2000 | 884 | | −3.5% |
| 2010 | 798 | | −9.7% |
| 2020 | 722 | | −9.5% |
U.S. Decennial Census

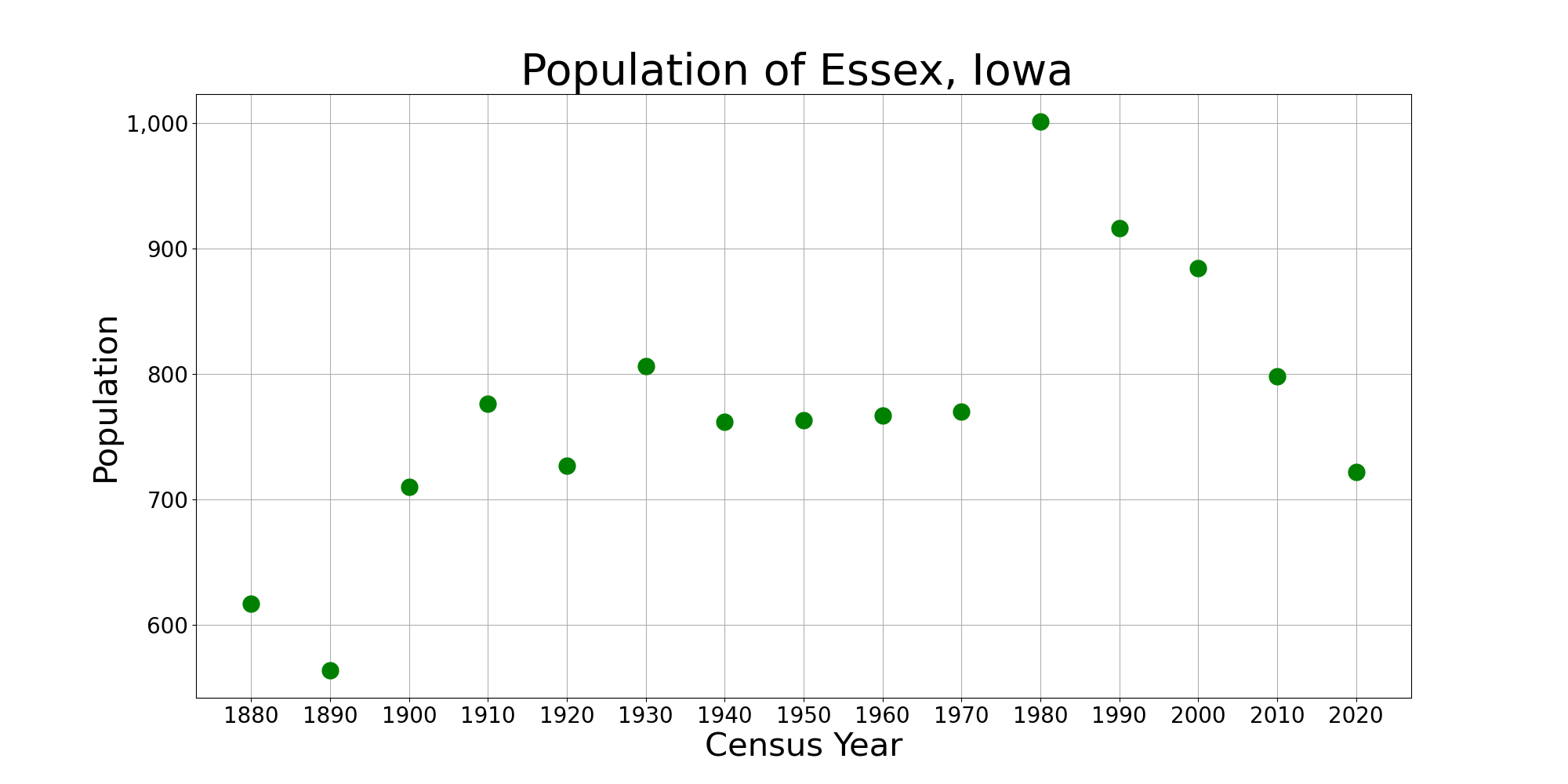
The population of Essex, Iowa from US census data

=== 2020 census ===
As of the census of 2020, there were 722 people, 339 households, and 207 families residing in the city. The population density was 479.9 inhabitants per square mile (185.3/km^{2}). There were 360 housing units at an average density of 239.3 per square mile (92.4/km^{2}). The racial makeup of the city was 94.7% White, 0.3% Black or African American, 1.2% Native American, 0.4% Asian, 0.0% Pacific Islander, 0.0% from other races and 3.3% from two or more races. Hispanic or Latino persons of any race comprised 1.1% of the population.

Of the 339 households, 24.8% of which had children under the age of 18 living with them, 46.9% were married couples living together, 5.9% were cohabitating couples, 25.4% had a female householder with no spouse or partner present and 21.8% had a male householder with no spouse or partner present. 38.9% of all households were non-families. 34.5% of all households were made up of individuals, 19.5% had someone living alone who was 65 years old or older.

The median age in the city was 45.8 years. 22.7% of the residents were under the age of 20; 5.0% were between the ages of 20 and 24; 21.1% were from 25 and 44; 24.9% were from 45 and 64; and 26.3% were 65 years of age or older. The gender makeup of the city was 50.1% male and 49.9% female.

=== 2010 census ===
As of the census of 2010, there were 798 people, 333 households, and 228 families living in the city. The population density was 528.5 inhabitants per square mile (204.1/km^{2}). There were 372 housing units at an average density of 246.4 per square mile (95.1/km^{2}). The racial makeup of the city was 97.2% White, 0.6% Native American, 0.9% from other races, and 1.3% from two or more races. Hispanic or Latino of any race were 2.0% of the population.

There were 333 households, of which 30.3% had children under the age of 18 living with them, 55.9% were married couples living together, 8.1% had a female householder with no husband present, 4.5% had a male householder with no wife present, and 31.5% were non-families. 29.7% of all households were made up of individuals, and 17.7% had someone living alone who was 65 years of age or older. The average household size was 2.40 and the average family size was 2.91.

The median age in the city was 44.3 years. 25.8% of residents were under the age of 18; 4.9% were between the ages of 18 and 24; 20.7% were from 25 to 44; 27.9% were from 45 to 64; and 20.9% were 65 years of age or older. The gender makeup of the city was 49.5% male and 50.5% female.

=== 2000 census ===
As of the census of 2000, there were 884 people, 356 households, and 260 families living in the city. The population density was 586.7 inhabitants per square mile (226.5/km^{2}). There were 393 housing units at an average density of 260.8 per square mile (100.7/km^{2}). The racial makeup of the city was 97.85% White, 0.57% Native American, 0.34% from other races, and 1.24% from two or more races. Hispanic or Latino of any race were 0.68% of the population.

There were 356 households, out of which 31.5% had children under the age of 18 living with them, 62.6% were married couples living together, 7.0% had a female householder with no husband present, and 26.7% were non-families. 23.6% of all households were made up of individuals, and 13.2% had someone living alone who was 65 years of age or older. The average household size was 2.48 and the average family size was 2.94.

Age spread: 25.3% under the age of 18, 5.5% from 18 to 24, 25.6% from 25 to 44, 25.3% from 45 to 64, and 18.2% that were 65 years of age or older. The median age was 39 years. For every 100 females, there were 100.0 males. For every 100 females age 18 and over, there were 101.2 males.

The median income for a household in the city was $41,382, and the median income for a family was $51,806. Males had a median income of $36,118 versus $22,604 for females. The per capita income for the city was $18,202. About 3.2% of families and 5.5% of the population were below the poverty line, including 7.4% of those under age 18 and 7.9% of those age 65 or over.

== Recreational Activities ==
- Anderson Park – Offers outdoors green space and a basketball court.
- Pierce Creek Recreational Area:
  - Established in 1979 when the Page County Conservation Board bought the 361 acres of land the park now lies upon.
  - Two campgrounds – One of which is equestrian only, stalls included.
  - Pierce Creek Pond that has a surface area of 33.00 acres and a maximum depth of 9.7 feet (2.96 meters).
  - Fishing permitted, gravel boat ramp included, and kayaking/canoeing activities.
  - ~7 miles of multi-use trails – Open to equestrian riders.
  - Gas powered vehicles prohibited — Electric motors allowed.
  - Public gun range.

== Education ==
The Essex Community School District operates local public schools.

== Transportation ==
While there is no fixed-route transit service in Essex, intercity bus service is provided by Jefferson Lines in nearby Shenandoah.

== Notable people ==
- Leanna Field Driftmier (1886–1976) pioneered the Kitchen-Klatter radio broadcast and magazine.
- Suzanne Rigg Olympian (1996 Atlanta)
- Jessie Young (1900–1987), widely regarded as the first of the radio homemakers.
