= Gilda Joyce =

2005 novel by Jennifer Allison

Gilda Joyce: Psychic Investigator
- Author: Jennifer Allison
- Cover artist: Greg Swearingen
- Language: English
- Series: Gilda Joyce
- Genre: Children's Mystery novel
- Publisher: Dutton Children's Books
- Publication date: July 2005
- Publication place: United States
- Media type: Print (Hardback)

Gilda Joyce: Psychic Investigator is a mystery novel series written by Jennifer Allison, published by Dutton Children's Books. According to Allison, the idea for the story of Gilda Joyce: Psychic Investigator first emerged while she was living in San Francisco and had recently been laid off from a "dot com". She wanted to write stories like the ones that had most moved her in her youth.

Gilda Joyce is a psychic investigator, a spy and an undercover reporter, who solves mysteries of the supernatural using a Ouija board, her wits and her Masters Psychic Handbook, seeking the answer to various mysteries, such as solving a mysterious death, and discovering the secrets of the cryptic society of the Ladies of the Lake.

The Gilda Joyce books have been translated into German, Chinese and other languages.

== Series ==
- Gilda Joyce: Psychic Investigator (July 2005)
- Gilda Joyce: The Ladies of the Lake (2006)
- Gilda Joyce: The Ghost Sonata (August 2007)
- Gilda Joyce: The Dead Drop (May 2009)
- Gilda Joyce: The Bones of the Holy (June 2011)

== Characters ==
Main Characters

- Gilda Joyce is 13 years old at the beginning of the series. A self-proclaimed psychic investigator, she has a 'magic typewriter' given to her by her dead father. She is a quirky, likeable, gutsy and funny character. Towards the end of the last book, she has grown to the age of 15/16.
- Wendy Choy is a brilliant piano player and an honor roll student. Sometimes she helps Gilda with her investigations, and once is the target of one.
- Steven is Gilda's older brother who has been immersed in his studies since their father died. He does not believe in Gilda's psychic abilities but still looks out for her. He also has a crush on Wendy.
- Mrs. Joyce is Gilda's mother who doesn't believe in Gilda's psychic powers, but tolerates them.
- Nick Joyce is Gilda's deceased father, who died of cancer two years before the events of the first novel. Gilda often writes letters to him on her old typewriter and once receives a vision from him telling her to wake up and listen to Juliet, who is muttering a conversation with her dead aunt in her sleep.

Gilda Joyce, Psychic Investigator

- Juliet Splinter is Gilda's cousin from San Francisco who lives in a huge mansion with her antisocial father. She is haunted by her dead aunt Melanie who jumped off the tower. She is a good artist but is friendless and isolated from the world until Gilda arrives.
- Lester Splinter is Juliet's father, who is separated from her mother and runs an accounting firm.
- Summer Matthews is Lester's assistant, who takes a liking to Gilda and offers to show her around San Francisco.
- Rosa is the Splinters' housekeeper, who often sees ghosts.
- Melanie is Lester's deceased sister, who committed suicide when Juliet was three.

Gilda Joyce: The Ladies of the Lake

- Dolores Lambert is a freshman at Our Lady of Sorrows High School who fell into the lake on the grounds and drowned.
- Danielle Menory is a senior at Our Lady of Sorrows and secretary of the Ladies of the Lake secret society.
- Priscilla Barkley is a senior at Our Lady Of Sorrows and president of the Ladies of the Lake.
