= Pierce Township, Page County, Iowa =

Township in Page County, Iowa, U.S.

Coordinates: 40°51′29″N 95°19′41″W

Pierce Township is a township in Page County, Iowa, United States.

== History ==
Pierce Township (Township 70, Range 39) was surveyed in June 1852 by Thomas D. Evans and was established in 1858. The railroad was built through Pierce Township in 1870, with a station located in Essex in the southeastern area of the township.
