= Chip Duncan =

American filmmaker, author and photographer

Chip Duncan (born January 3, 1955) is an American filmmaker, author and photographer, known principally for documentaries on history, current affairs, travel, and natural history. He is also president of Duncan Group, Inc., a production company and has produced feature films including Eden, nominated for the 1996 Grand Jury Prize at Sundance Film Festival and Row Your Boat starring Jon Bon Jovi.

== Early life and education ==
Chip Duncan was born in Shenandoah, Iowa, and later resided in Michigan and Wisconsin. Duncan graduated from the University of Wisconsin, Madison with a degree in English and Communication Arts. At that time, he was member of the campus band Broken Bow. The band released one album, Arrival, in 1981.

== Film and television career ==
Duncan began his career in media at an NBC affiliate as a news producer and photographer. He co-wrote for the 1985 remake of The Twilight Zone and founded his own production company the same year. His early career saw him produce Is Anyone Listening? (1986–87), an educational series for teenagers.

In 1992, Duncan made Tatshenshini: A Journey to the Ice Age, a documentary for public television. He won the Best New Wildlife Filmmaker award at the 1993 Jackson Hole Wildlife Festival for his 1993 production Alaska's Bald Eagle: New Threats to Survival. During his production of the 1994 public television special Positive Thinking: The Norman Vincent Peale Story, Duncan and co-producer David Crouse interviewed five American presidents: Richard Nixon, Jimmy Carter, Gerald Ford, George H. W. Bush and Ronald Reagan.

Duncan's production of the 1996 13-part television series Mystic Lands, about spiritual places of the world, debuted on Discovery Networks. Duncan was the series creator, executive producer, and director.

Duncan's feature film credits include producing Eden, a 1996 Sundance Film Festival Finalist, nominated for the Grand Jury Prize. That same year, Duncan was executive producer of the movie Cadillac Ranch. He was also producer of the movie Row Your Boat featuring Jon Bon Jovi and co-executive producer of The Break Up featuring Kiefer Sutherland and Bridget Fonda.

In 1999, Duncan produced and directed Through One City's Eyes, an in-depth campaign on race relations that included a nationwide public television broadcast, a seven-part public radio series, a two-part classroom series for middle school students, and a traveling photo museum.

In 2015, Duncan released The Sound Man, a documentary about 62-year old Kenyan sound engineer Abdul Rahman Ramadhan's career covering crisis zones in East Africa. Working with photojournalist Mohamed Amin, Abdul recorded the sounds of genocide, war, revolution, anarchy and famine in Ethiopia, Eritrea, Kenya, Sudan, Somalia and Rwanda.

== Books ==
Duncan's first non-fiction book, released under the name John Ryan Duncan, was The Magic Never Ends –- The Life and Work of C.S. Lewis, published in 2001 by Thomas Nelson Publishing. It was released in paperback by Augsburg Press in 2004. He also wrote Enough To Go Around: Searching for Hope in Afghanistan, Pakistan & Darfur, released in 2009 by Select Books.

His first fiction book, Half A Reason to Die: Eight Short Stories, was published in spring of 2017 by Select Books. Duncan's fourth book, a return to non-fiction, was Inspiring Change: The Photographic Journey of Chip Duncan, released in 2018 by Thunder House Press.

“Ewaso Village: Poems and Stories From Laikipia County, Kenya”, was published in 2022 by Select Books.

== Photography ==
Duncan's work as a still photographer has been exhibited in numerous locations since 2009, including the Charles Allis Art Museum (2018), the Kenosha Public Museum (2016), Council on Foreign Relations (2013), the World Peace Festival in Berlin (2011), the O Street Museum in Washington, DC (2011) and the Crooked Tree Arts Center in Michigan (2009). His photographic work heavily features people from Afghanistan, Ethiopia, Peru, Sudan, Ghana, Colombia, Pakistan and Kenya.

== Other work ==
Duncan is president of the Duncan Group Inc., a documentary and feature film production company established in 1984. He is a board member for the Juneau Icefield Research Program, a trustee for the Loisaba Community Conservation Foundation, and an advisor to the World Peace Festival in Berlin and the America's Black Holocaust Museum in Milwaukee, Wisconsin.

== Filmography ==
=== Feature films ===
- Eden (1996) - Producer
- Cadillac Ranch (1997) – Executive Producer
- The Break Up (1999) - Co-executive producer
- Row Your Boat (1998) - Producer
- Coyotes (1999) - Co-executive producer

=== Documentaries ===
- The Nuclear Nightmare (1986)
- To Whom It May Concern (1986)
- Urban Turf (1986)
- Decisions: Teens, Sex & Pregnancy (1986)
- Back On The Street (1986)
- No Fault Kids (1987)
- Fitting In: A New Look At Peer Pressure (1987)
- Emphasis Wisconsin: Water (1989)
- Washington D.C.: A Capital Adventure (1989)
- Emphasis Wisconsin: Maximum Security & Prison Boot Camp (1990)
- New York: City of Cities (1990)
- Australia: Secrets Of The Land Down Under (1990)
- India: Land Of Spirit & Mystique (1991)
- Greece: Playground of the Gods (1991)
- Norway: Nature's Triumph (1992)
- Denmark: The Jewel Of Europe (1992)
- Sweden: Nordic Treasure (1992)
- Astrodudes (1993)
- Scotland: Land of Legends (1994)
- Scandinavia: Land of the Midnight Sun (1994)
- Alaska's Bald Eagle: New Threats To Survival (1994)
- Tatshenshini: A Journey To The Ice Age (1994)
- Positive Thinking (1994)
- Iowa: An American Portrait (1996; as Photographer)
- Mystic Lands (1996; 13-part series)
- The World Sacred Music Festival (1999)
- Worth Fighting For (1999)
- Through One City's Eyes (1999)
- Wisconsin: An American Portrait (2000)
- Rafting Alaska's Wildest Rivers (2001)
- The Magic Never Ends: The Life and Work of CS Lewis (2002)
- In A Just World: Contraception, Abortion & World Religion (2003)
- Henry A. Wallace (2004; as Photographer/Consulting Producer)
- Beyond The Gridiron: The Life & Times of Woody Hayes (2004)
- The Cost of Freedom: Civil Liberties, Security and the USA PATRIOT Act (2004)
- The Rivalry (2007; as Consulting Producer)
- Prayer In America (2007)
- Landslide: A Portrait of President Herbert Hoover (2009)
- The Reagan Presidency (2013)
- The Sound Man (2015)
- Tolkien & Lewis - Myth, Imagination and the Quest for Meaning (2017; released nationwide in the United States on public television in September 2017 by American Public Television)
- “The First Patient” (2018)
- “Pizza & Prana” (2020)
- “Magnificent Madness” (2022)
