= Theodore F. MacManus =

American businessman and philanthropist

- Born: 1872; Buffalo, New York, U.S.
- Died: September 12, 1940; Sudbury, Ontario, Canada
- Occupation(s): Businessman, philanthropist
- Spouse: Alice (Holdridge) MacManus
- Children: 4

Theodore F. MacManus (1872–1940) was an American businessman and philanthropist.

== Biography ==
=== Early life ===
Theodore MacManus was born in 1872 in Buffalo, New York.

=== Career ===
He started his career as a newspaper reporter. Later, as a copywriter, he revolutionized advertising with his work on advertisements for luxury cars by General Motors, including Cadillacs. His best-known advertisement, written in 1915, is called "The Penalty of Leadership." Later, Elvis Presley hung it on a wall in his Graceland mansion, suggesting it described him well.

In 1927, he started his own advertising company, the MacManus agency. It later became MacManus, John & Adams in 1934, and later the D'Arcy MacManus Benton & Bowles, until it became known as the MacManus Group.

=== Philanthropy ===
A devout Roman Catholic, he funded the construction of St. Hugo of the Hills Catholic Church, which was originally on his estate and now serves as the parish church for Bloomfield Hills, Michigan.

=== Personal life ===
He was married to Alice Holdridge MacManus. They had six children.

They resided at the Stonycroft mansion in Bloomfield Hills, Michigan. He died in 1940 at his summer home in Sudbury, Ontario. In his obituary it was noted that the pioneer of automobile advertising never learned to drive.
