= Fear (anthology) =

2010 horror anthology edited by R. L. Stine

Fear: 13 Stories of Suspense and Horror
- First edition cover
- Author: R. L. Stine, Heather Graham, Suzanne Weyn, Jennifer Allison, Heather Brewer, Peg Kehret, Alane Ferguson, Ryan Brown, F. Paul Wilson, Meg Cabot, Walter Sorrells, James Rollins, Tim Maleeny
- Cover artist: Tony Sahara
- Language: English
- Genre: Horror fiction
- Published: September 1, 2010
- Publisher: Dutton Juvenile; Speak
- Publication place: United States
- Media type: Print (paperback, hardcover, and turtleback)
- Pages: 306
- ISBN: 0-525-42168-8
- OCLC: 526057524
- LC Class: PZ5 .F32 2010

Fear: 13 Stories of Suspense and Horror is a 2010 horror anthology edited by R. L. Stine. Thirteen different authors contributed stories to the anthology, including Meg Cabot, Heather Graham, F. Paul Wilson, and Stine himself. Stine began writing the anthology after the International Thriller Writers asked him to write a book with several stories. Critical reception for the short story collection was positive, with one reviewer stating the stories were highly suspenseful, inventive, easy to understand, and fast-paced.

== Plot ==
The beginning of the book starts with an introduction from R. L. Stine. At the end of the book, there is an "About the Authors" section that includes a brief description of the contributors to the anthology along with some of their works.

| Title | Author | Plot |
|---|---|---|
| Welcome to the Club | R. L. Stine | JJ is the new kid in town, and works at Florian's diner to pay the bills. One night, the cool kids give him a chance to be their friend—but in order to join their club he has to kill someone. |
| She's Different Tonight | Heather Graham | Vince Romero has been watching Ivanna Romanoff, and tonight is the night he's going to seduce her. The two head to a graveyard to be alone, but it seems like Vince might have bitten off more than he can chew. |
| Suckers | Suzanne Weyn | When Phil's rich parents drag him and his siblings to Lectus, a private planet that only the wealthiest can live on, they're expecting to relax. But a girl named Etchenia says that something terrible once happened here, and it will happen again soon. Could the strange light in the sky and disappearances be connected to Etchenia's warning? |
| The Perfects | Jennifer Allison | On her first day in Entrails, Michigan, Hannah is approached by her new neighbour for a babysitting job. But there's something strange about Mrs. Perfect and her family—and their house is even stranger. And Hannah can hear a baby crying, a baby that Mrs. Perfect denies being there. Can she get to the bottom of things before it's too late? |
| Shadow Children | Heather Brewer | Dax's younger brother, Jon, is afraid of the dark. Jon says that the "shadow children", shadowy creatures in the dark, will come and get him if the lights are out. Dax never believed his stories, but it turns out Jon has been right all along. Dax will have to rescue his brother from the mysterious domain of the shadow children if he wants them both to survive the night. |
| The Poison Ring | Peg Kehret | During a string of robberies and burglaries, a poison ring is stolen. A teenager notices a woman wearing the ring and follows her to a retirement home, where the teenager is kidnapped. |
| Dragonfly Eyes | Alane Ferguson | A man takes two hostages from a school classroom. He shoots one of them, Savannah, in the head, killing her. Savannah's soul leaves her body, but she's still here. Sensing that the man plans on killing the other hostage, takes action. Can Savannah save the other girl before it's too late? |
| Jeepers Peepers | Ryan Brown | Elizabeth discovers during her babysitting job that when the boy she is babysitting thinks about creatures he calls "creepers", they come to life. During the night, these creepers enter the house and start choking Elizabeth before the boy imagines them away. |
| Piney Power | F. Paul Wilson | The Pineys, a group of people who live in the forest, determine two men have been dumping toxic waste on their property. But "Piney Power" has a little more meaning than Levi Coffins, an outsider, knows. Are The Pineys new friends? Or is there something else at play? |
| The Night Hunter | Meg Cabot | Nina works at a department store, and every night she calls the local radio station asking them to play "The Night Hunter". It's her favorite song, written about a local legend who helps people in need. But tonight, Nina is kidnapped by a man wearing a clown mask after she bungles his robbery of a nearby bank. Could it be that the Night Hunter is real after all? And can he find Nina in time? |
| Tuition | Walter Sorrells | Marlon is promised his college tuition will be paid for after he steals valuable computer chips in a safe at the headquarters of a company. He wants out of his life of crime, and Princeton is waiting. But this simple heist is getting more complicated by the second, and if Marion screws up, he's in big trouble. Because today is his birthday, and he's officially eligible for real prison. |
| Tagger | James Rollins | When Soo-ling uses her spraypaint, she feels like she's making a difference in L.A. She gets strange visions of disasters, and it seems like a symbol passed down from her mother is the only way to prevent them. But when a strange spirit called "gui sou" starts stalking Soo-ling and threatening the biggest disaster yet, she will have to use friendship, tradition, and her imagination to save the day. |
| Ray Gun | Tim Maleeny | Raymond Gunstein ("Ray Gun" to his dad) is headed to his father's science conference in D.C. But after Ray, bumps into an enigmatic girl on the train, things quickly go off the rails. Can Ray survive the horrors that await him or is this the end of the line? |

== Background ==
R. L. Stine started writing the book after he was asked by the professional association International Thriller Writers (ITW) to write a book with several stories. The book was published on September 1, 2010, and is available in three formats: paperback, hardcover, and turtleback. Half the proceeds from book sales go to ITW, whereas the other half goes to Reading is Fundamental (RIF), a non-profit literacy organization. In 2010, RIF hosted a party celebrating the release of the book in New York City.

Jennifer Allison's story, "The Perfects", was partly inspired by an old Victorian house she passed each morning on her way to school. "Ray Gun" was Tim Maleeny's first story for young adults.

== Reception ==
Critical reception for the book was positive. An unknown contributor from Kirkus Reviews felt that the stories in the anthology were highly suspenseful, inventive, easy to understand, and fast-paced. Benjamin Boche from TeenReads.com stated that "some of the tales aren’t for the faint of heart, some deal with the intricacies of what science can do, and some are just plain creepy." School Library Journal's Joy Fleishhacker said the book incorporated "a pleasing mix of genres, hair-raising events, and deftly drawn protagonists," and that "each tale is fresh and unique while still falling within the compilation's creep-me-out confines." She also felt that the stories in the anthology were surprising and enticing.

Daniel Kraus from Booklist stated that this anthology contained "uninspired entries" although it "keeps the reading level consistent, which makes it a good entry point for reluctant readers moving on from Stine’s own oeuvre". He thought the best story was "Tuition" by Walter Sorrells, but also felt Suzanne Weyn's "Suckers" and "Piney Power" by F. Paul Wilson were worthy of notice. Dawn Crowne from RT Book Reviews recommended the stories to those who like reading about urban legends.

== Bibliography ==
- Stine, R. L., ed. (2010). Fear: 13 Stories of Suspense and Horror. Speak. ISBN 978-0-14-241774-4.
