= Iowan's Hotel =

Former hotel in Iowa, U.S.

- U.S. National Register of Historic Places
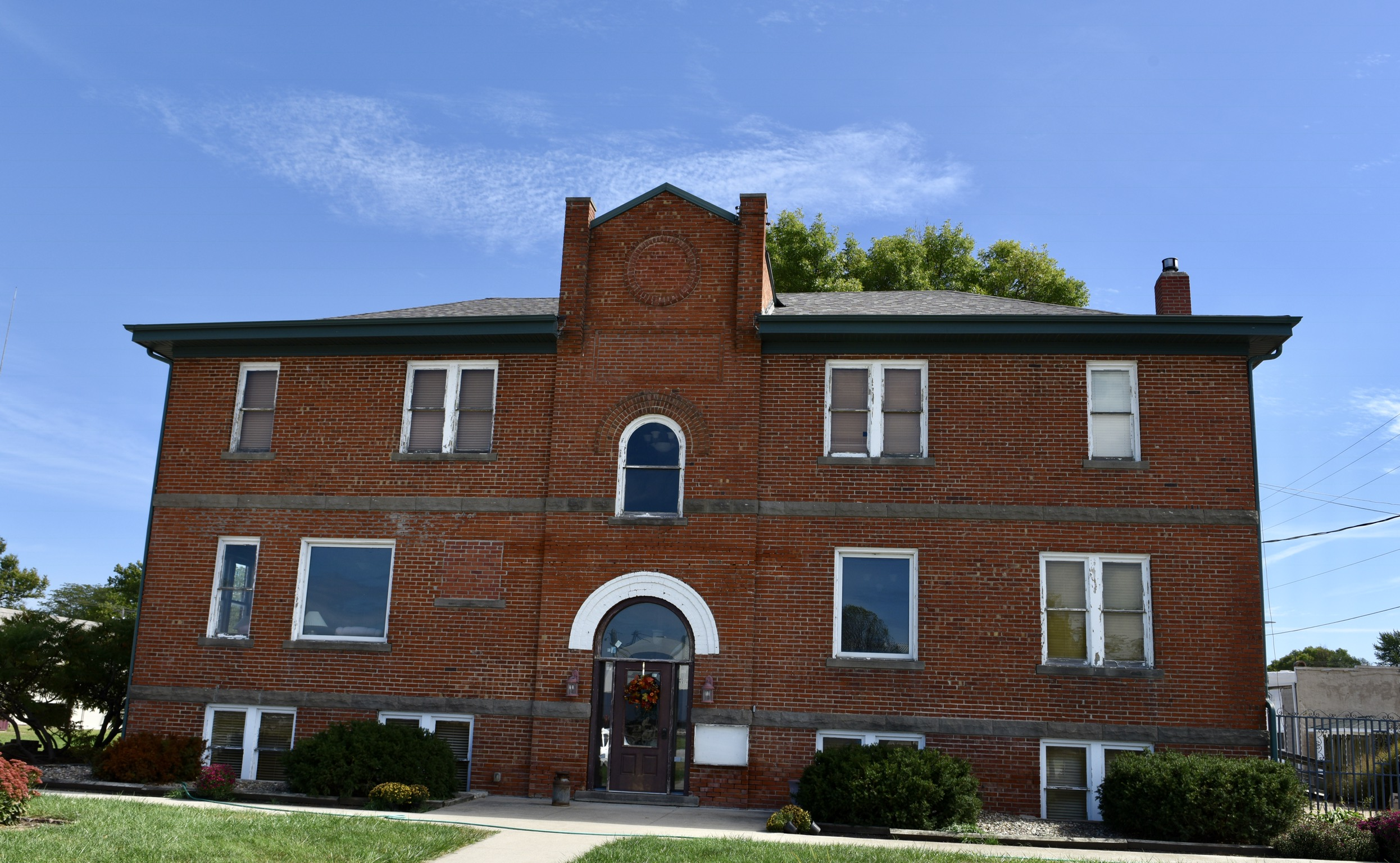

- Location within Iowa Location within the United States
- Location: 508 E. Railroad St. Essex, Iowa
- Coordinates: 40°50′03″N 95°18′26″W
- Area: less than one acre
- Built: 1906
- Architect: Denton Belt
- Architectural style: Colonial Revival
- NRHP reference No.: 08001382
- Added to NRHP: January 29, 2009

The Iowan's Hotel, now known as the Railroad Inn, is a historic building located in Essex, Iowa, United States. The town of Essex was established by the Burlington and Missouri River Railroad. It was platted in 1870 as a station along the line. The depot opened in 1871 and the Lindel Hotel was completed in 1878. This building was completed in 1906 to replace the outdated Lindel. It operated under a variety of names over the years, including the Essex Hotel, Rose Hotel, Commercial Hotel, Bradley Hotel, Butler Hotel, Essex House, and the Railroad Inn. It is operated as a bed and breakfast under the last name. The building was listed on the National Register of Historic Places in 2009.

The hotel is a two-story, brick structure that rests on a brick foundation. The basement rises a half story above grade. The rectangular main block is capped with a hipped roof. Five guest rooms are located on the second floor.
