= Acme Mills =

Textile company based in Michigan

Acme Mills Company and Textile Industries, Inc.
- Company type: Privately held company
- Industry: Textiles
- Founded: 1917
- Headquarters: Bloomfield Hills, Michigan
- Parent: Acme Group
- Website: www.acmemills.com; www.acmemills.com/acme-mills-company-2
- Footnotes / references Full name

Acme Mills Company is a privately held textiles conversion and finishing company based in Bloomfield Hills, Michigan. Founded in 1917, it is a subsidiary of the Acme Group. The company's services include cutting, sewing, dyeing, and finishing fabrics.

== Operations ==
The company is headquartered in Bloomfield Hills, Michigan. It also owns 100,000 square feet of industrial space in Quincy, Michigan, which it leases to Paragon Metals.

== History ==
Acme Mills was founded in 1917 to manufacture cotton batting for automotive seat cushions. As a member of the Acme Group, the company currently supplies industrial fabrics to the automotive, furniture, and aviation industries.

== Dymetrol ==
Dymetrol is a woven fabric suspension system introduced by Du Pont at the 1984 SAE Show in Detroit. It incorporates a patented elastomeric monofilament called Hytrel. The fabric has been adapted for seating and suspension in vehicles, furniture, aircraft, trains, and marine vessels.

== Acme Group ==
The Acme Group is headquartered in Bloomfield Hills, Michigan. Its member companies include Acme Mills, Great Lakes Filters, and Fairway Products.

=== Group operations ===
The Group manages two manufacturing facilities in Hillsdale, Michigan, and a third in Santa Teresa, New Mexico. It also operates a recycling facility in St. Clair Shores, Michigan.

=== Group corporate governance ===
As of 2014, Acme Group's chief revenue officer was Matt Utley, and its chief financial officer was Raymond Lambert.
