= KMA-FM =

Radio station in Iowa, U.S.

Simulcasts KMA, Shenandoah
- Clarinda, Iowa; United States
- Broadcast area: Western Iowa; Northwestern Missouri
- Frequency: 99.1 MHz
- Branding: KMAland 960 AM and 99.1 FM

Programming
- Format: Talk
- Affiliations: ABC News Radio; Compass Media Networks; Westwood One; St. Louis Cardinals Radio Network

Ownership
- Owner: KMAland Broadcasting, LLC
- Sister stations: KMA

History
- First air date: 1977
- Former call signs: KSWI (1977–1979); KQWI (1979–1989); KQIS (1989); KMA-FM (1989–1992); KKBZ (1992–2008)
- Former frequencies: 106.3 MHz (1977–1989); 106.1 MHz (1989–1995); 99.3 MHz (1995–2010)
- Call sign meaning: Named for KMA founder Earl May

Technical information
- Licensing authority: FCC
- Facility ID: 35106
- Class: C1
- ERP: 100,000 watts
- HAAT: 299 meters (981 ft)
- Transmitter coordinates: 40°48′4″N 94°54′6.9″W

Links
- Public license information: Public file; LMS
- Webcast: Listen live
- Website: www.kmaland.com

KMA-FM (99.1 MHz) is a radio station broadcasting a talk radio format as a simulcast of KMA, Shenandoah, Iowa. Licensed to Clarinda, Iowa, United States, the station is owned by KMAland Broadcasting, LLC

== History ==
What is today KMA-FM went on the air in 1977 on 106.3 MHz as KSWI. The first call sign reflected its initial owners, Southwest Iowa Stereo. Not long after signing on, however, Kendall Light, the station's owner, died. In 1979, the station was sold by Light's estate and became KQWI.

In 1989, KQWI moved to 106.1 MHz and was able to broadcast with 50,000 watts; by the fall of 1989, it began its first stint as KMA-FM. In 1995, the station, KKBZ with a hot adult contemporary format, was approved to move to 99.3, and the 99.1 frequency was obtained in 2010.

== See also ==
- List of three-letter broadcast call signs in the United States
