= List of Michigan locations by per capita income =

Michigan has an estimated per capita income of $27,549 and median household income of $50,803

== Michigan counties by per capita income ==
Note: Data is from the 2010 United States Census Data and the 2006-2010 American Community Survey 5-Year Estimates.

Rank	County	Per capita income	Median household income	Median family income	Population	Number of households
1	Oakland	$56,138	$85,991	$94,783	1,202,362	483,698
2	Leelanau	$32,194	$56,527	$65,342	21,708	9,255
3	Livingston	$31,609	$72,129	$82,637	180,967	67,380
4	Washtenaw	$31,316	$59,065	$82,184	344,791	137,193
5	Charlevoix	$28,403	$48,704	$57,022	25,949	10,882
6	Midland	$28,363	$51,103	$63,299	83,629	33,437
7	Emmet	$28,308	$49,235	$61,600	32,694	13,601
	United States	$27,334	$51,914	$62,982	308,745,538	116,716,292
8	Clinton	$27,223	$58,016	$69,611	75,382	28,766
9	Grand Traverse	$27,091	$50,647	$61,780	86,986	35,328
10	Macomb	$26,524	$53,996	$67,423	840,978	331,667
11	Eaton	$25,963	$54,885	$66,788	107,759	43,494
12	Monroe	$25,520	$55,366	$66,549	152,021	58,230
13	Kalamazoo	$25,138	$44,794	$61,622	250,331	100,610
	Michigan	$25,135	$48,432	$60,341	9,883,640	3,872,508
14	Lapeer	$25,110	$55,005	$63,061	88,319	32,776
15	Ottawa	$25,045	$55,095	$65,474	263,801	93,775
16	Kent	$24,791	$49,532	$61,097	602,622	227,239
17	Barry	$24,493	$51,869	$61,202	59,173	22,551
18	Berrien	$24,025	$42,625	$54,751	156,813	63,054
19	Antrim	$23,912	$43,123	$50,424	23,580	9,890
20	Ingham	$23,883	$45,808	$61,680	280,895	111,162
21	Dickinson	$23,854	$42,586	$54,053	26,168	11,359
22	St. Clair	$23,828	$49,120	$59,969	163,040	63,841
23	Benzie	$23,649	$44,718	$53,250	17,525	7,298
24	Marquette	$23,347	$45,130	$61,798	67,077	27,538
25	Allegan	$23,108	$50,240	$57,831	111,408	42,018
26	Bay	$23,049	$44,659	$53,824	107,771	44,603
27	Cheboygan	$23,038	$37,903	$45,769	26,152	11,133
28	Cass	$22,698	$45,177	$54,813	52,293	20,604
29	Otsego	$22,568	$45,531	$54,110	24,164	9,756
30	Lenawee	$22,529	$48,618	$60,028	99,892	37,514
31	Genesee	$22,458	$43,483	$54,072	425,790	169,202
32	Mackinac	$22,170	$39,339	$51,376	11,113	5,024
33	Calhoun	$22,166	$42,568	$52,533	136,146	54,016
34	Wayne	$22,125	$42,241	$52,946	1,820,584	702,749
35	Huron	$22,098	$40,038	$49,444	33,118	14,348
36	Delta	$22,064	$41,951	$51,442	37,069	15,992
37	Van Buren	$22,002	$44,435	$54,499	76,258	28,928
38	Jackson	$21,947	$46,117	$56,314	160,248	60,771
39	Shiawassee	$21,869	$46,453	$54,363	70,648	27,481
40	Mason	$21,760	$40,039	$49,131	28,705	11,940
41	Saginaw	$21,662	$42,954	$53,171	200,169	79,011
42	Menominee	$21,624	$41,332	$49,394	24,029	10,474
43	Manistee	$21,612	$40,853	$50,101	24,733	10,308
44	Ontonagon	$21,448	$35,269	$47,330	6,780	3,258
45	Keweenaw	$21,307	$38,872	$46,414	2,156	1,013
46	Alpena	$21,140	$36,695	$47,256	29,598	12,791
47	Crawford	$21,002	$39,665	$45,362	14,074	6,016
48	Newaygo	$20,870	$43,218	$49,499	48,460	18,406
49	Presque Isle	$20,870	$37,383	$43,797	13,376	5,982
50	Gladwin	$20,571	$37,936	$44,427	25,692	10,753
51	Iosco	$20,513	$36,861	$44,175	25,887	11,757
52	Schoolcraft	$20,455	$36,925	$48,141	8,485	3,759
53	Chippewa	$20,309	$40,194	$54,066	38,520	14,329
54	Roscommon	$20,194	$33,542	$40,015	24,449	11,433
55	St. Joseph	$20,192	$44,392	$52,586	61,295	23,244
56	Hillsdale	$20,006	$42,989	$50,546	46,688	17,792
57	Iron	$19,986	$33,734	$44,560	11,817	5,577
58	Wexford	$19,952	$39,997	$46,659	32,735	13,021
59	Tuscola	$19,937	$42,198	$50,262	55,729	21,590
60	Gogebic	$19,933	$33,673	$45,182	16,427	7,037
61	Alcona	$19,904	$34,858	$43,482	10,942	5,089
62	Alger	$19,858	$38,262	$47,548	9,601	3,898
63	Kalkaska	$19,770	$39,350	$45,417	17,153	6,962
64	Muskegon	$19,719	$40,670	$50,101	172,188	65,616
65	Sanilac	$19,645	$40,818	$49,005	43,114	17,132
66	Missaukee	$19,560	$40,376	$46,371	14,849	5,843
67	Ionia	$19,386	$46,454	$54,595	63,905	22,144
68	Baraga	$19,107	$40,541	$50,549	8,860	3,444
69	Montmorency	$19,102	$34,447	$41,230	9,765	4,416
70	Arenac	$19,073	$36,689	$45,376	15,899	6,701
71	Branch	$19,049	$42,133	$50,931	45,248	16,419
72	Mecosta	$18,745	$35,887	$48,145	42,798	16,101
73	Montcalm	$18,569	$39,775	$46,673	63,342	23,432
74	Oscoda	$18,524	$32,346	$39,335	8,640	3,772
75	Isabella	$18,510	$36,880	$55,183	70,311	25,586
76	Clare	$18,491	$34,399	$42,519	30,926	12,966
77	Oceana	$18,402	$39,543	$46,424	26,570	10,174
78	Gratiot	$18,388	$40,114	$49,989	42,476	14,852
79	Ogemaw	$18,321	$35,968	$41,810	21,699	9,283
80	Houghton	$18,267	$34,174	$46,819	36,628	14,232
81	Osceola	$17,861	$38,341	$44,613	23,528	9,222
82	Luce	$17,195	$40,041	$46,510	6,631	2,412
83	Lake	$16,084	$31,205	$38,996	11,539	5,158
