= Gilda Joyce: Psychic Investigator =

2005 book by Jennifer Allison

- Author: Jennifer Allison
- Illustrator: Greg Swearingen
- Language: English
- Series: Gilda Joyce
- Publisher: Dutton Children's Books
- Publication date: 2005
- Publication place: USA
- Pages: 321
- ISBN: 0-525-47375-0
- OCLC: 55228488
- LC Class: PZ7.A4428 Gi 2005
- Followed by: Gilda Joyce: The Ladies of the Lake

Gilda Joyce, Psychic Investigator is the first book in the Gilda Joyce mystery series for children written by Jennifer Allison. Gilda Joyce, Psychic Investigator was published by Dutton Children's Books. There are three books in the series: Gilda Joyce: Psychic Investigator; Gilda Joyce: The Ladies of the Lake; and Gilda Joyce: The Ghost Sonata.

== Synopsis ==
Gilda Joyce is a spunky, 13-year-old that wants to be a psychic investigator. She (and her not so enthusiastic friend) start an investigation. They go around town spying on people. Gilda lives in Detroit with her mother, and older brother, Stephen, as her father died of illness two years ago. Before his death, he told Gilda that she should have his typewriter, saying that "it's a magic typewriter," so Gilda keeps it with her as much as possible and tries to incorporate it into her psychic investigations, such as for Automatic Writing. After Gilda, following her instinct, lies to her class and teacher saying that she is going to San Francisco for the summer. She looks into ways of getting to San Francisco for the summer, so that her bluff wouldn't actually have been a lie. She soon learns of her uncle, Lester Splinter, her mother's second cousin and a stranger to the family, whose sister, Melanie Splinter, met her death through a suicide jump from the top of a tower in the Splinters' own backyard. Thrilled at this opportunity for investigation into Melanie's death, Gilda quickly writes a letter to Mr. Splinter introducing herself and requesting that she be allowed to stay at his house for the summer. The letter, upon its arrival in San Francisco, is found by Mr. Splinter's assistant, Summer, who finds Gilda very intriguing and writes back inviting Gilda to stay, and providing airline fare for her. Meanwhile, Juliet Splinter, Lester Splinter's 13-year-old daughter, is bedridden with a broken rib and a twisted ankle. Juliet, having come home from ballet class one day, was considering swallowing some of her father's sleeping pills when she seemed to see Aunt Melanie standing at the top of the staircase she was climbing, causing her to faint and fall down the stairs. When Gilda arrives in San Francisco to find that the sunny, warm paradise she had pictured was covered with fog during the summer so the mansion she will be staying in is hardly a place of fun and that her only company of her age group will be Juliet Splinter, Mr. Splinter's petite, unsociable, sadistic daughter who is currently recovering from an "accident" which makes her enthusiasm dampen slightly. But soon, through a little investigation, Gilda and Juliet become unlikely partners on their mission to uncover what really happened to Melanie Splinter. Together, they complete the mystery all and all, and Gilda is sent back to her regular life.

== Awards ==
- School Library Journal Best Books of 2005
- Booklist Top Ten Mysteries of 2005
