= Leanna Field Driftmier =

American radio personality (1886–1976)

Leanna Field Driftmier (1886–1976) was an American radio personality and writer based in Shenandoah, Iowa. Driftmier’s daily 30-minute show Kitchen-Klatter was broadcast around the midwestern United States for five decades. It was the longest-running homemaker show in US radio history.

== Early life ==
Driftmier was born Leanna Field April 3, 1886 on a farm near Shenandoah. Driftmier was one of seven children. Her sister Jessie Field Shambaugh was a founder of the 4-H movement; her brother Henry Field was a seed company and radio entrepreneur. After graduating from high school in Shenandoah, Driftmier taught school in Essex, Iowa. She moved to California to help care for aging relatives. While in California, Driftmier attended Los Angeles State Normal College, then taught school near San Bernardino for one or two years. On a visit to her hometown she met widower Martin Driftmier. They married June 25, 1913 and settled in Shenandoah.

== Radio career ==
When Driftmier’s brother Henry Field built 500-watt radio station KFNF in 1924, Leanna began helping her sister Helen on The Mother’s Hour program. Helen left the show in 1926. Driftmier took over the show and renamed it Kitchen-Klatter.

For the first four years, Driftmier broadcast from the station’s studio with her young children sitting quietly in the corner. When a back injury forced her to bedrest in 1930, she hosted the show from her bedroom. She used a wheelchair for the remainder of her life and broadcast thereafter from her kitchen. Broadcasting from the home became a trend followed by other homemaker hosts of the time.

Kitchen-Klatter eventually moved to rival station KMA, also in Shenandoah, and was syndicated around the Midwest, reaching listeners in Iowa, Nebraska, Kansas, Missouri and surrounding areas. Kitchen-Klatter was a "chatty" and "instructive" show, a welcome “friend” for isolated rural women. Driftmier shared recipes, talked about her family, offered gardening homemaking and parenting tips. She was the most well known of Shenandoah’s popular homemaker hosts, and described as an “authoritative,” “regal presence” on the air. A fellow Shenandoah radio personality said that during World War II, Driftmier sent thousands of letters to parents who had lost their sons in the war.

== Kitchen-Klatter Magazine and products ==
Early in the life of the program, Driftmier started writing a newsletter as a way to respond to listeners’ correspondence. The publication expanded and took on the name Kitchen-Klatter Magazine. It featured a newsy letter from Driftmier, recipes, health hints, poems and book suggestions.

Driftmier wrote and published cookbooks and books on sewing. The name Kitchen-Klatter was attached to home products such as flavorings, seasonings, and cleaning products, sold out of Shenandoah.

== Later years ==
Driftmier was named Iowa Mother of the Year in 1954. She hosted Kitchen-Klatter until 1959, when her daughter Lucile Driftmier Verness took over the show and magazine. Driftmier appeared occasionally for another 17 yrs until her death on September 30, 1976.

The Kitchen-Klatter show and magazine continued under leadership of Driftmier’s daughter and granddaughter for another nine years.
