= Shenandoah, Iowa =

- City
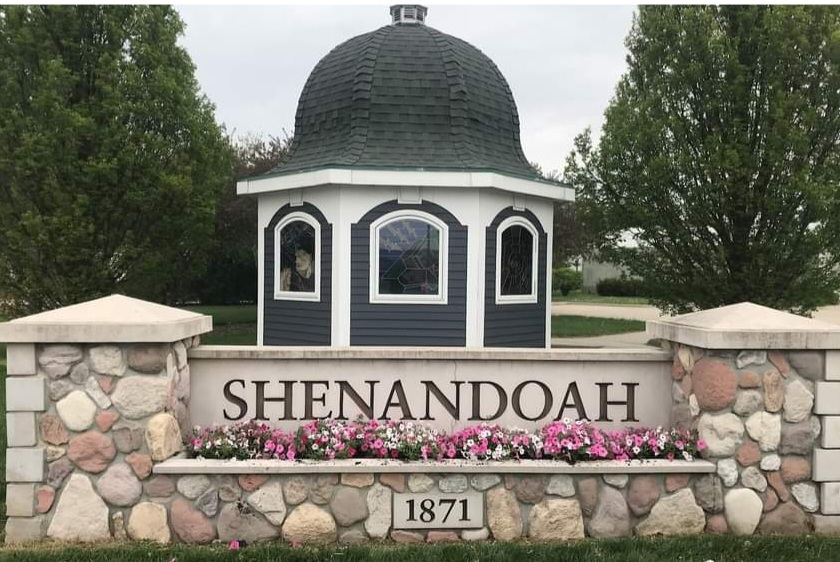
- Downtown Shenandoah Sign

- Location of Shenandoah, Iowa
- Coordinates: 40°45′12″N 95°22′19″W
- Country: United States
- State: Iowa
- Counties: Fremont and Page

Area
  - Total: 3.73 sq mi (9.67 km^{2})
  - Land: 3.73 sq mi (9.67 km^{2})
  - Water: 0 sq mi (0.00 km^{2})
- Elevation: 1,004 ft (306 m)

Population (2020)
  - Total: 4,925
  - Density: 1,319.4/sq mi (509.44/km^{2})
- Time zone: UTC-6 (Central (CST))
  - Summer (DST): UTC-5 (CDT)
- ZIP codes: 51601-51603
- Area code: 712
- FIPS code: 19-72525
- GNIS feature ID: 2395872
- Website: shenandoahiowa.net

Shenandoah is a city in Page and Fremont counties in Iowa, United States. The population was 4,925 at the time of the 2020 U.S. census. Once referred to as the "seed and nursery center of the world," Shenandoah is the home to Earl May Seed Company and the radio station KMA, founded by Earl E. May. The early live radio stations gave many performers their start, including The Everly Brothers and Charlie Haden.

== History ==
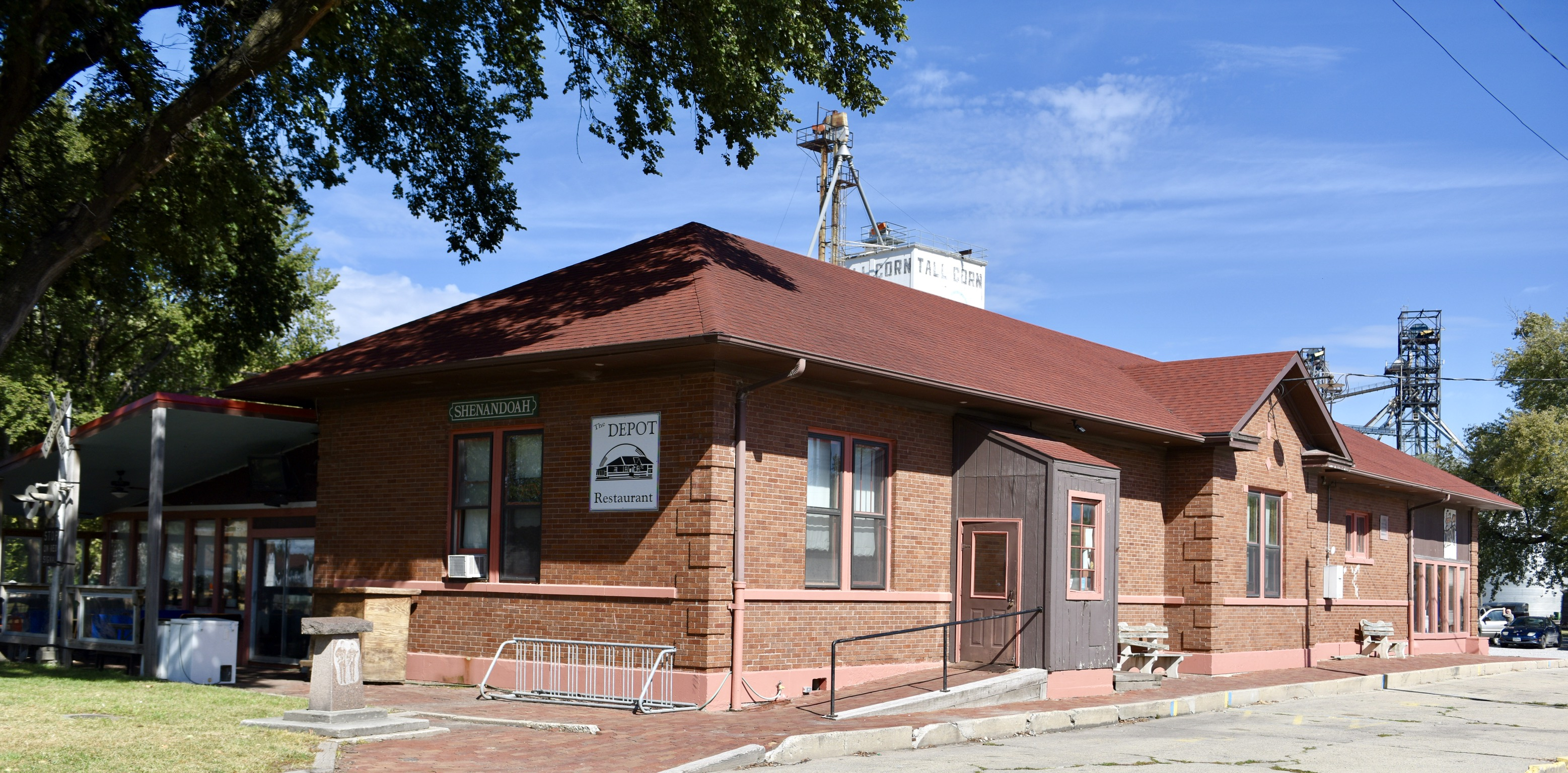
Wabash Combindation Depot in western Shenandoah.

Shenandoah, originally known as Fair Oaks, was platted in 1870, shortly after the arrival of the Chicago, Burlington and Quincy Railroad into the neighborhood. Its name is derived from the local valley's resemblance to the Shenandoah Valley, in Virginia.

In 1885, a smallpox epidemic in Shenandoah prompted the closing of schools, and the cancellation of church services and public meetings. Quarantine orders were established for households with smallpox, and guards were posted outside affected homes. On June 11, J.C. Wilson was employed as quarantine officer. During this time, Shenandoah musician W.F. Strong composed a piano arrangement called "Quarantine Polka".

== Geography ==
Shenandoah is located along Fourmile Creek near its confluence with the East Nishnabotna River.

According to the United States Census Bureau, the city has a total area of 3.75 square miles (9.71 km^{2}), all of it land.

=== Climate ===
Climate data for Shenandoah, Iowa (1991–2020, extremes 1918–present)
Month	Jan	Feb	Mar	Apr	May	Jun	Jul	Aug	Sep	Oct	Nov	Dec	Year
Record high °F (°C)	69 (21)	78 (26)	90 (32)	94 (34)	99 (37)	106 (41)	112 (44)	113 (45)	105 (41)	97 (36)	84 (29)	73 (23)	113 (45)
Mean maximum °F (°C)	56.3 (13.5)	62.4 (16.9)	76.1 (24.5)	85.9 (29.9)	91.0 (32.8)	94.3 (34.6)	96.8 (36.0)	95.8 (35.4)	92.9 (33.8)	87.0 (30.6)	72.0 (22.2)	60.0 (15.6)	98.4 (36.9)
Mean daily maximum °F (°C)	33.4 (0.8)	38.7 (3.7)	51.6 (10.9)	63.7 (17.6)	73.8 (23.2)	83.3 (28.5)	86.9 (30.5)	85.2 (29.6)	79.0 (26.1)	66.3 (19.1)	50.7 (10.4)	37.9 (3.3)	62.5 (16.9)
Daily mean °F (°C)	23.5 (−4.7)	28.4 (−2.0)	40.4 (4.7)	51.8 (11.0)	63.2 (17.3)	73.2 (22.9)	76.8 (24.9)	74.6 (23.7)	66.7 (19.3)	53.9 (12.2)	40.1 (4.5)	28.5 (−1.9)	51.8 (11.0)
Mean daily minimum °F (°C)	13.7 (−10.2)	18.0 (−7.8)	29.3 (−1.5)	39.9 (4.4)	52.5 (11.4)	63.1 (17.3)	66.7 (19.3)	64.0 (17.8)	54.5 (12.5)	41.6 (5.3)	29.4 (−1.4)	19.1 (−7.2)	41.0 (5.0)
Mean minimum °F (°C)	−8.0 (−22.2)	−1.6 (−18.7)	8.5 (−13.1)	23.9 (−4.5)	37.0 (2.8)	50.2 (10.1)	55.4 (13.0)	52.7 (11.5)	38.3 (3.5)	24.8 (−4.0)	12.5 (−10.8)	−1.6 (−18.7)	−11.7 (−24.3)
Record low °F (°C)	−26 (−32)	−29 (−34)	−22 (−30)	8 (−13)	26 (−3)	36 (2)	41 (5)	38 (3)	23 (−5)	15 (−9)	−8 (−22)	−26 (−32)	−29 (−34)
Average precipitation inches (mm)	0.92 (23)	1.21 (31)	2.06 (52)	3.34 (85)	6.16 (156)	5.53 (140)	4.36 (111)	3.77 (96)	3.02 (77)	2.84 (72)	1.76 (45)	1.40 (36)	36.37 (924)
Average snowfall inches (cm)	7.0 (18)	7.5 (19)	2.8 (7.1)	1.2 (3.0)	0.0 (0.0)	0.0 (0.0)	0.0 (0.0)	0.0 (0.0)	0.0 (0.0)	0.6 (1.5)	1.5 (3.8)	5.8 (15)	26.4 (67)
Average precipitation days (≥ 0.01 in)	5.1	5.9	7.0	9.8	11.9	10.2	9.5	8.6	7.3	7.5	5.7	5.3	93.8
Average snowy days (≥ 0.1 in)	3.3	3.0	1.2	0.3	0.0	0.0	0.0	0.0	0.0	0.3	0.8	2.3	11.2
Source: NOAA

== Demographics ==
Historical populations
Year	Pop.	±%
1880	1,387	—
1890	2,440	+75.9%
1900	3,573	+46.4%
1910	4,976	+39.3%
1920	5,255	+5.6%
1930	6,502	+23.7%
1940	6,846	+5.3%
1950	6,938	+1.3%
1960	6,567	−5.3%
1970	5,968	−9.1%
1980	6,274	+5.1%
1990	5,572	−11.2%
2000	5,546	−0.5%
2010	5,150	−7.1%
2020	4,925	−4.4%
Source:"U.S. Census website". United States Census Bureau. and Iowa Data Center; Source: U.S. Decennial Census

=== 2020 census ===
As of the 2020 census, Shenandoah had a population of 4,925, with 2,241 households and 1,236 families residing in the city. The population density was 1,319.4 inhabitants per square mile (509.4/km^{2}). There were 2,536 housing units at an average density of 679.4 per square mile (262.3/km^{2}), of which 11.6% were vacant. The homeowner vacancy rate was 3.8% and the rental vacancy rate was 9.5%.

The median age was 44.3 years. Of residents, 23.3% were under the age of 20 (including 21.4% under 18), 5.1% were between the ages of 20 and 24, 22.4% were from 25 to 44, 24.5% were from 45 to 64, and 24.8% were 65 years of age or older. The gender makeup of the city was 49.4% male and 50.6% female; for every 100 females, there were 97.7 males, and for every 100 females age 18 and over, there were 95.9 males age 18 and over.

Of the 2,241 households, 23.3% had children under the age of 18 living in them. Of all households, 39.7% were married-couple households, 6.5% were cohabitating-couple households, 23.4% had a male householder with no spouse or partner present, and 30.4% had a female householder with no spouse or partner present. About 44.8% of households were non-families, 39.5% were made up of individuals, and 19.3% had someone living alone who was 65 years of age or older.

98.6% of residents lived in urban areas, while 1.4% lived in rural areas.

Racial composition as of the 2020 census
Race	Number	Percent
White	4,513	91.6%
Black or African American	16	0.3%
American Indian and Alaska Native	15	0.3%
Asian	38	0.8%
Native Hawaiian and Other Pacific Islander	0	0.0%
Some other race	101	2.1%
Two or more races	242	4.9%
Hispanic or Latino (of any race)	222	4.5%

=== 2010 census ===
At the 2010 census there were 5,150 people, 2,310 households, and 1,366 families living in the city. The population density was 1,373.3 inhabitants per square mile (530.2/km^{2}). There were 2,611 housing units at an average density of 696.3 units per square mile (268.8 units/km^{2}). The racial makeup of the city was 96.4% White, 0.3% African American, 0.2% Native American, 0.5% Asian, 1.1% from other races, and 1.5% from two or more races. Hispanic or Latino of any race were 4.0%.

Of the 2,310 households 26.1% had children under the age of 18 living with them, 44.3% were married couples living together, 10.8% had a female householder with no husband present, 4.0% had a male householder with no wife present, and 40.9% were non-families. 37.0% of households were one person and 19% were one person aged 65 or older. The average household size was 2.18 and the average family size was 2.82.

The median age was 44.4 years. 22.4% of residents were under the age of 18; 6.5% were between the ages of 18 and 24; 21.5% were from 25 to 44; 26.5% were from 45 to 64; and 23% were 65 or older. The gender makeup of the city was 46.6% male and 53.4% female.

=== 2000 census ===
At the 2000 census there were 5,546 people, 2,421 households, and 1,486 families living in the city. The population density was 1,599.6 inhabitants per square mile (617.6/km^{2}). There were 2,645 housing units at an average density of 762.9 units per square mile (294.6 units/km^{2}). The racial makeup of the city was 97.91% White, 0.11% African American, 0.47% Native American, 0.22% Asian, 0.72% from other races, and 0.58% from two or more races. Hispanic or Latino of any race were 2.72%.

Of the 2,421 households 25.9% had children under the age of 18 living with them, 48.6% were married couples living together, 9.7% had a female householder with no husband present, and 38.6% were non-families. 34.2% of households were one person and 17.8% were one person aged 65 or older. The average household size was 2.22 and the average family size was 2.84.

Age spread: 22.4% under the age of 18, 8.2% from 18 to 24, 23.9% from 25 to 44, 22.4% from 45 to 64, and 23.1% 65 or older. The median age was 42 years. For every 100 females, there were 85.8 males. For every 100 females age 18 and over, there were 82.5 males.

The median household income was $29,435 and the median family income was $39,110. Males had a median income of $31,657 versus $18,588 for females. The per capita income for the city was $16,301. About 11.0% of families and 15.4% of the population were below the poverty line, including 26.9% of those under age 18 and 8.0% of those age 65 or over.

== Tarkio Sloths ==
Recent excavations of at least three Jefferson's ground sloths, Megalonyx jeffersonii, have been coordinated by the Iowa Museum of Natural History along West Tarkio Creek near Shenandoah.

== Minor league baseball ==
Shenandoah was home to minor league baseball. The Shenandoah Pin Rollers played as members of the Class D level Southwest Iowa League in 1903 and Missouri-Iowa-Nebraska-Kansas League (MINK) in 1910 and 1911.

== Media ==
The Southwest Iowa Herald (formerly the Valley News) Shenandoah and its neighbor city Clarinda's community newspaper. Published every Wednesday and distributed to homes throughout Page and Fremont Counties, the Southwest Iowa Herald is the community's oldest continually-operated business. Its predecessors include the award-winning Evening Sentinel.

The radio stations KMA AM and KFNF were early pioneering radio stations attracting listeners throughout the Mid-West and drawing thousands of visitors to the city in the 1920s. The radio station KMA-FM 99.1 is in the same complex as KMA. Both stations share a simulcast, except for sporting events and other special programming.

== Education ==
Shenandoah Community School District Operates Public Schools

Iowa Western Community College Shenandoah Campus

== Transportation ==
Jefferson Lines provides intercity bus service in Shenandoah, on a route between Kansas City and Sioux Falls.

== Sister Cities ==
Shenandoah is sister cities with Tisovec, Slovakia.

== Notable people ==
A historical marker in Shenandoah denoting the (since relocated) site of the Everly Brothers' childhood home

- Leanna Field Driftmier (1886–1976), long-time radio host
- Chip Duncan (born 1955), filmmaker
- The Everly Brothers, musicians
- Willis Glassgow, American football player and attorney
- Charlie Haden (1937–2014), jazz musician
- Gary Kellgren (1939–1977), founder of the Record Plant
- Jim Ross Lightfoot (born 1938), U.S. representative from Iowa
- Bernie Masterson (1911–1963), American football player and coach
- Derryl McLaren (born 1949), Iowa state senator
- Michael J. O'Brien (born 1939), Iowa state representative
- James Pearson (1873–1950), lieutenant governor of Nebraska and radio preacher
- Agnes Samuelson (1887–1963), educator and Iowa state superintendent of education
- Jay Scheib (born 1969), theatre director
- Jessie Field Shambaugh (1881–1971), founder of 4-H
- Jessie Young (1900–1987), radio host and the first radio homemaker

== See also ==
- Women's Christian Temperance Union Public Fountain
