= Teen Talking Circles =

U.S. nonprofit organization

Teen Talking Circles, formerly known as The Daughters Sisters Project, is a nonprofit organization co-founded by Linda Wolf and K. Wind Hughes in 1993 in Washington state, and incorporated as a nonprofit organization in 1997. The name was changed to Teen Talking Circles in 2001. TTC's mission is to inspire, educate, and empower young women and men, foster partnerships between the genders, generations and cultures, and support youth to take thoughtful actions for a just, compassionate, and sustainable world. The four branches of TTC are Daughters Sisters; Brothers Sons; GenderTalks; and Global Youth Allies. This change was instigated in order to include young men and youth activism into the programs. In 1998, the Daughters Sisters Project received the Athena Award for Excellence in Mentoring. In 1999, TTC was honored in Washington, D.C., as a Computerworld Laureate.

The Computerworld Honors Program brings together the principals of the world's foremost information technology companies to recognize and document the achievements of the men, women, organizations and institutions around the world, whose visionary applications of information technology promote positive social, economic and educational change.

== Publications ==
Published books include: Daughters of the Moon, Sisters of the Sun: Young Women and Mentors on the Transition to Womanhood, (New Society Publishers, 1997) was the catalyst for creating the Daughters Sisters Project, and eventually the Teen Talking Circle Project. Global Uprising: Confronting the Tyrannies of the 21st Century - Stories from a New Generations of Activists, (New Society Publishers, 2001).

Articles & Media on the Daughters Sisters Project and Teen Talking Circles include:

- Bainbridge Island Review
- Seattle Children's Hospital
- Lilipoh Magazine feature article
- LA Yoga Journal
- Voice America
- Seattle Times
- Women's Radio
- In Context Magazine
- New Dimensions Radio
