= KMA (AM) =

- Shenandoah, Iowa; United States
- Frequency: 960 kHz
- Branding: KMAland 960 AM and 99.1 FM

Programming
- Format: Talk
- Affiliations: ABC News Radio; Compass Media Networks; Westwood One; Kansas City Royals

Ownership
- Owner: KMAland Broadcasting, LLC
- Sister stations: KMA-FM

History
- First air date: August 12, 1925 (first license granted)
- Former frequencies: 650 kHz (1925–1927); 1110 kHz (1927); 760 kHz (1927–1928); 930 kHz (1928–1941)
- Call sign meaning: named for original owner Earl May

Technical information
- Licensing authority: FCC
- Facility ID: 35107
- Class: B
- Power: 5,000 watts
- Transmitter coordinates: 40°46′47.99″N 95°21′23.96″W
- Repeater: 99.1 KMA-FM (Clarinda)

Links
- Public license information: Public file; LMS
- Webcast: Listen live
- Website: www.kmaland.com

KMA (960 kHz) is an AM radio station licensed to serve Shenandoah, Iowa.

== History ==
The station was founded in 1925 by seed salesman Earl May. In 1925 Henry A. Field, owner of Field's Nursery in Shenandoah, Iowa, and a business rival of May, founded a competing radio station, KFNF. While both stations offered farm news, the two were to become most competitive by offering live productions of hillbilly music. According to KMA's website, more than a million people traveled to small-town Shenandoah to hear the music.

May built the station headquarters and Mayfair Auditorium at the Mayfair Theatre (the theatre being closed in 1963, the studio demolished in 1964 due to its being declared structurally unsafe by the Iowa State Fire Marshal, and the entire building being demolished in 1966) across the street from the nursery business. Between music sets, May would pitch his seeds and tell nostalgic stories. In 1926 May won the third annual Radio Digest Gold Cup Award, after being voted the "World's Most Popular Radio Announcer" by over 452,000 people throughout the United States.

The KMA shows which were broadcast in the afternoons were called the "KMA Country School" and according to the format emanated from the fictional KMA District No. 9 school with the shows beginning with the ringing of a school bell.

Performers would often go to Council Bluffs, Iowa, after the show where they would perform at night.

The most famous celebrities in KMA's history were the Everly Brothers, Don and Phil. In their early teen years, the brothers and their parents would appear on KMA to sing as "The Everly Family", but by 1952, they were discovered by a talent agent, and made their way to fame in Nashville with such hit songs as "Wake Up, Little Susie".

With the high visibility KMA operated on a slogan of "Keep Millions Advised", which was adopted in early 1926, after sorting through a reported 4,000 suggestions. KFNF was to operate on "Keep Friendly, Never Frown".

In 1949, May Broadcasting company started KMTV in Omaha, the second-oldest television station in Nebraska. May Broadcasting originally wanted to call the television station KMA-TV. The Federal Communications Commission, however, would not allow the two outlets to share call letters as the cities of Shenandoah and Omaha were too far apart (61 miles (98 km)). In 1968, May acquired a second TV outlet, KGUN-TV in Tucson, Arizona. May Broadcasting sold both KMTV and KGUN-TV to Lee Enterprises in 1986; both stations are now owned by the E. W. Scripps Company.

The county school shows were discontinued in the 1950s and the station continued to offer its farm show and farm housewife shows until the late 1990s; the current format revolves around ABC News Radio at the top of each hour, with some agricultural news, regional high school sports and their "Elephant Shop" where listeners can buy, sell, trade or give away personal property on the air.

In March 2010, KMA Broadcasting launched a new 100,000-watt FM station, KMA-FM 99.1, licensed to Clarinda, Iowa, and broadcasting from facilities north of neighboring Hawleyville. KMAland Broadcasting also owns Hometown Cable in southwest Iowa.

The Earl May Seed and Nursery Company is still family-owned. Earl May's granddaughter, Betty Jane Shaw, is the current head of the company. Field eventually sold KFNF and its seed business; the current holder of the KFNF callsign, an FM station in Oberlin, Kansas, is unrelated to the former KFNF. The 920 AM frequency formerly occupied by KFNF is now KYFR, a Christian radio station owned by Family Radio.

Effective December 16, 2019, the May family sold the radio station and its assets to KMAland Broadcasting, LLC, a group consisting of local investors. The sale marked the end of over 94 years of family ownership.

== In popular culture ==
In the book The Bridges of Madison County, which sold more than 60 million copies, the characters listen to KMA. Any references to KMA in the 1995 movie (which was directed by Clint Eastwood) were removed; the format of the radio station in the film was switched to jazz.

== See also ==
- List of three-letter broadcast call signs in the United States
