= Jennifer Allison =

American author of mystery novels

- Born: Jennifer Allison Brostrom; July 15, 1966 (age 60); Saline, Michigan, U.S.
- Education: University of Michigan (BA); American University (MFA)
- Occupations: Novelist; educator; writer
- Relatives: Kenneth Brostrom, Matthew Brostrom
- Writing career
- Period: 2005–present
- Genre: Fiction
- Notable works: Gilda Joyce: Psychic Investigator; Gilda Joyce: The Ladies of the Lake
- Website: www.jenniferallison.com

Jennifer Allison (born July 15, 1966) is an American author of mystery novels who is best known as the author of the Gilda Joyce children's series of books.

Born Jennifer Allison Brostrom, she grew up in Saline, Michigan and is a 1984 graduate from Saline High School. Jennifer holds a BA from the University of Michigan, where she attended on a music scholarship, but soon became more interested in literature and writing. She also holds an M.F.A. from American University. Her first book was written while she was living in San Francisco, California and was published in July 2005. She currently resides in Chicago, Illinois.

== Bibliography ==
=== Gilda Joyce ===
1. Gilda Joyce, Psychic Investigator (2005) ISBN 978-0-14-240698-4, ISBN 0-525-47375-0
2. Gilda Joyce: The Ladies of the Lake (2006) ISBN 978-0-14-240907-7, ISBN 0-525-47693-8
3. Gilda Joyce: The Ghost Sonata (2007) ISBN 978-0-14-241232-9
4. Gilda Joyce: The Dead Drop (2009) ISBN 978-0-14-241638-9, ISBN 978-0-525-47980-2
5. Gilda Joyce, Psychic Investigator: The Bones of the Holy (2011) ISBN 978-0-14-241990-8, ISBN 978-0-525-42212-9

=== Iggy Loomis ===
1. Iggy Loomis, Superkid in Training (2014) ISBN 978-0-14-242573-2
2. Iggy Loomis, A Hagfish Called Shirley (2014) ISBN 978-0-80-373781-5

=== Other work ===
1. Fear (2010) ISBN 0-525-42168-8
