= Gilda Joyce: The Ladies of the Lake =

Book by Jennifer Allison

- Author: Jennifer Allison
- Illustrator: Greg Swearingen
- Cover artist: Jay Cooper (design)
- Language: English
- Series: Gilda Joyce
- Genre: Children's Mystery novel
- Published: 2006 Dutton Children's Books
- Publication place: United States
- Media type: Print (Hardback)
- Pages: 334 pp
- Preceded by: Gilda Joyce: Psychic Investigator
- Followed by: Gilda Joyce: The Ghost Sonata

Gilda Joyce: The Ladies of the Lake is a mystery novel written by Jennifer Allison, published by Dutton Children's Books.

== Plot summary ==
When Gilda Joyce earns a scholarship to attend Our Lady of Sorrows, a private high school for Catholic girls, she discovers that a girl named Dolores Lambert had drowned in the lake near the school a few years ago. In this novel, self-proclaimed psychic investigator Gilda Joyce investigates the mysterious happenings that seem to connect with the drowning of Dolores. Some people say that Dolores walked blindfolded onto a sheet of cracked ice that was overlapping the lake on the eve of Thanksgiving, while trying to get to her house. However, Gilda suspects that someone might have intentionally pushed Dolores into the depths of the lake or made her walk on it. Gilda investigates the drowning of Dolores, and approaches the truth after eavesdropping and sneaking into places she was not supposed to be. Eventually, she discovers that Danielle Menory, Priscilla Barkley, and Nikki Grimaldi were members of The Ladies of the Lake, a secret society. In her initiation ceremony, blindfolded Dolores had to find her way to the ruins where they had the secret club, and she "accidentally" wandered onto the lake and drowned. The girls are eventually punished. The only downfall is that Gilda's scholarship to Our Lady of Sorrows is taken away for having failing grades, although it is implied that she was kicked out for revealing that three of the school's most prized citizens were involved in murder, even if it was an accident.

== Characters ==
- Gilda Joyce - Psychic Investigator (Self-Proclaimed), Student, exceptional writer, determined, short red hair, 13 years old.
- Wendy Choy -A BFF of Gilda Joyce, Student (attending a different school)
- Dolores Lambert - A girl who drowned at Our Ladies of Sorrows a few years ago. In the end it is revealed she is a ghost.
- Mrs. Joyce - Gilda's mother, nurse
- Shirley McCraken - Headmistress of Our Ladies of Sorrows
- Priscilla Barkley- A student of Our Ladies of Sorrows also President of Ladies of the Lake. ^Involved in the killing of Dolores Lambert. She's the "captain" of the Ladies of the Lake club.
- Danielle Menory- Another student of Our Ladies of Sorrows also Secretary of Ladies of the Lake. ^Involved in the killing of Dolores Lambert. Of the members of the group, she feels the most guilty about the death of Dolores.
- Tiara- a girl who tries telling everyone that the school is haunted and would not give up on the thought.
- Velma Underhill - A secretary at Our Ladies of Sorrows
- Mr. Pante - A teacher at Our Ladies of Sorrows, often mispronounced as "Mr. Panty". Many girls in his class have crushes on him.
- Nikki Grimaldi - A student from Our Ladies of Sorrows also Activities Director of Ladies of the Lake. ^Involved in the killing of Dolores Lambert.
- Brad Squib - Mrs. Joyce's obnoxious boyfriend (later becomes ex-boyfriend)
- Stephen Joyce - Gilda's geeky brother

The author is Jennifer Allison.

- ^ = Drowned not killed.

== Awards ==
2007 Edgar Awards Nominee

2006 VOYA Top Shelf Fiction Selection for Middle School Readers Characters: Gilda Joyce Mrs. Joyce Catholic girls Dolores P. Lambert Mrs.McCracken Miss Underhill Marcie Wendy Choy Brad Squib Velma Master Psychic Mr. Joyce
