= Tyronza Water Tower =

- U.S. National Register of Historic Places
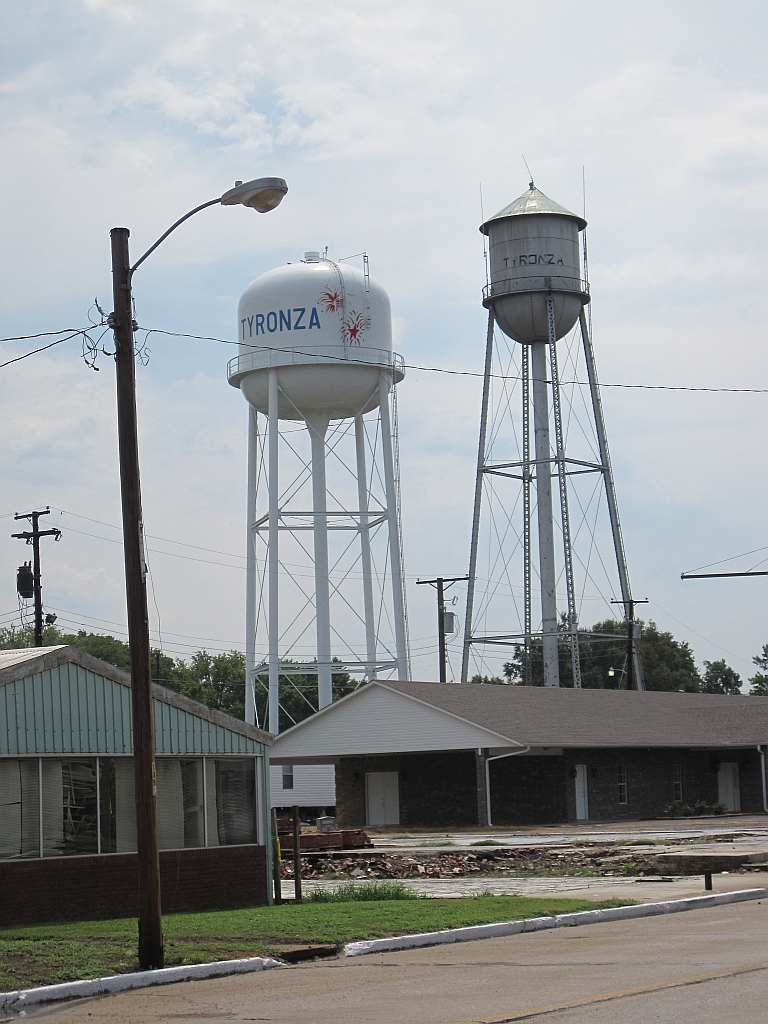
- The historic 1935 tower is located on the right, while the 2003 tower is on the left.

- Location within Arkansas Location within the United States
- Location: NW of jct. of Main St. and Oliver St., Tyronza, Arkansas
- Coordinates: 35°29′24″N 90°21′30″W
- Area: less than one acre
- Built: 1935
- Built by: Chicago Bridge & Iron Company
- Architectural style: Plain Traditional
- MPS: New Deal Recovery Efforts in Arkansas MPS
- NRHP reference No.: 07000963
- Added to NRHP: September 20, 2007

The Tyronza Water Tower is a historic elevated steel water tower located in Tyronza, Arkansas. It was built in 1935 by the Chicago Bridge & Iron Company in conjunction with the Public Works Administration as part of a project to improve the local water supply. It was added to the National Register of Historic Places in 2007, as part of a multiple-property listing that included numerous other New Deal-era projects throughout Arkansas. The Tyronza Water Tower is considered an excellent representation of 1930s-era waterworks construction.

In 2003, a new, 200,000-gallon steel water tower was built next to the 1935 tower, in conjunction with other water system improvements in the area. The old tower is still in use, however.

== See also ==
- Cotter Water Tower
- Hampton Waterworks
- Mineral Springs Waterworks
- Monette Water Tower
- National Register of Historic Places listings in Poinsett County, Arkansas
- Waldo Water Tower (Waldo, Arkansas)
