= Hartford Water Tower =

- U.S. National Register of Historic Places
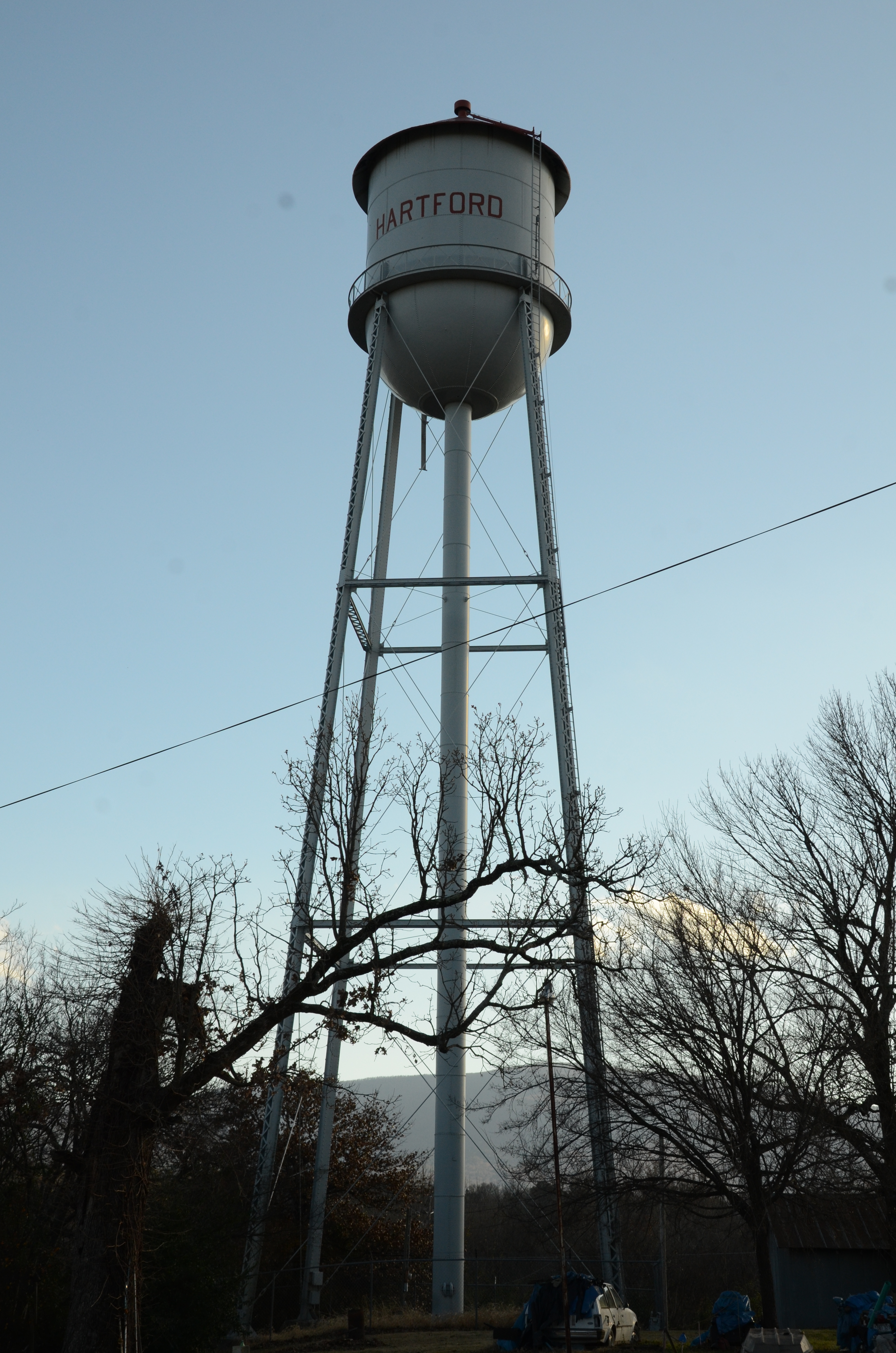

- Location within Arkansas Location within the United States
- Location: Pine & 1st. Sts., Hartford, Arkansas
- Coordinates: 35°1′30″N 94°22′37″W
- Area: less than one acre
- Built: 1936
- Built by: Chicago Bridge & Iron Company
- MPS: New Deal Recovery Efforts in Arkansas MPS
- NRHP reference No.: 07001434
- Added to NRHP: January 24, 2008

The Monette Water Tower is a historic elevated steel water tower located in Hartford, Arkansas. It was built in 1936 by the Chicago Bridge & Iron Company in conjunction with the Public Works Administration as part of a project to improve the local water supply. The project was one of 124 similar projects in the state funded by the PWA. It was added to the National Register of Historic Places in 2008, as part of a multiple-property listing that included numerous other New Deal-era projects throughout Arkansas.

== See also ==
- Cotter Water Tower
- Hampton Waterworks
- Mineral Springs Waterworks
- Monette Water Tower
- National Register of Historic Places listings in Sebastian County, Arkansas
- Waldo Water Tower (Waldo, Arkansas)
