= Chicago Bridge & Iron Company =

American engineering company

CB&I
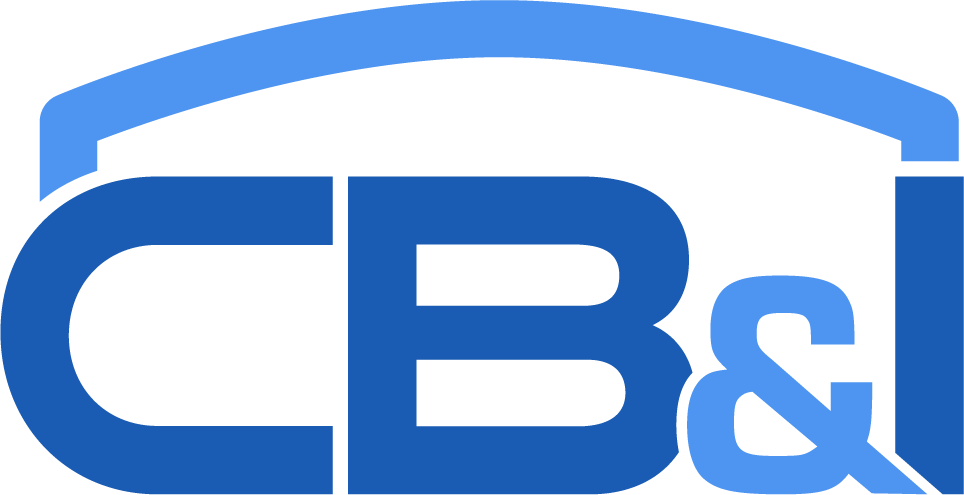
- ISIN: US1672501095
- Industry: Engineering; Construction; Oil and gas
- Founded: 1889
- Founder: Horace E. Horton
- Headquarters: The Woodlands, Texas
- Area served: Worldwide
- Key people: Mark Butts (President & CEO); Michael Caldwell (CFO); Kate Muir (Chief Administrative Officer); Shane Willoughby (Chief Legal & Strategy Officer)
- Number of employees: >6,000 (2026)
- Website: www.cbi.com

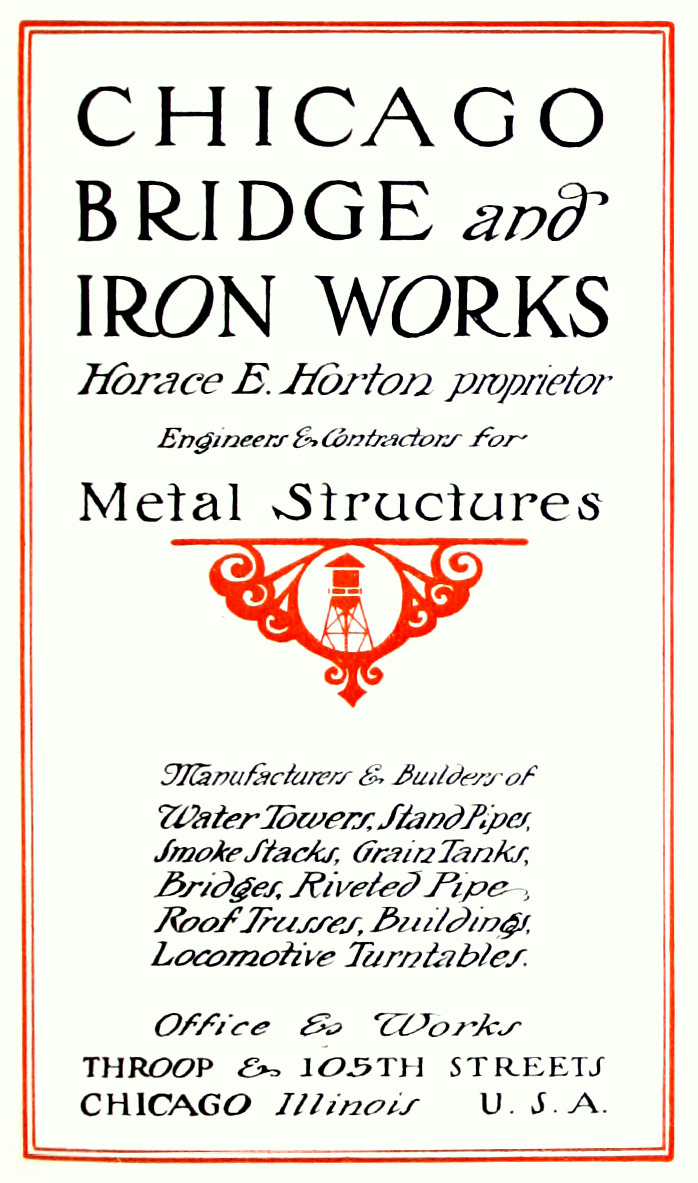
Chicago Bridge & Iron Works, 1912 catalog

CB&I, originally known as Chicago Bridge & Iron Co, is a global EPC firm that specializes in storage solutions for infrastructure and industrial projects and asset management services. CB&I was founded in 1889 and is headquartered in The Woodlands, Texas. Initially known for its expertise in bridge construction, CB&I evolved over the years to focus on large-scale steel tank fabrication. According to one of the founder's heirs about present-day CB&I, "The old joke is that Chicago Bridge & Iron isn't in Chicago, doesn't build bridges and doesn't use iron."

The company designs, fabricates and installs storage tanks and terminals, pressure vessels, special plate structures, and complete storage process facilities. CB&I also integrates process equipment, piping systems, instrumentation, and control systems for storage operations. In 2026, following the acquisition of Petrofac's Asset Solutions business, CB&I became a provider of operations maintenance and decommissioning services for onshore and offshore energy assets. The company operates globally with facilities across North America, Europe, the Middle East, and Asia.

== History ==
Frank's Ford Bridge, one of Horton's oldest projects which still stands.

CB&I was founded by Horace E. Horton of Rochester, Minnesota when he moved to Chicago, Illinois in 1889. Horton, an experienced engineer, capitalized on the booming infrastructure needs of the era, initially focusing on bridge construction, which was essential for expanding rail networks across the Midwest. By the late 1890s, CB&I diversified beyond bridge construction, taking on projects such as railroad roundhouses, locomotive turntables, roof trusses and bulk liquid storage, coinciding with the western expansion of railroads across the United States and the discovery of oil in the Southwest. CB&I played a role in water infrastructure improvements, constructing elevated water tanks and standpipes to meet growing municipal needs. CB&I quickly became known for design engineering and field construction of elevated water storage tanks, above-ground tanks for storage of petroleum and refined products, refinery process vessels and other steel plate structures. CB&I was at the forefront of several technological advancements, including the construction of the world's first field-erected spherical pressure vessels (Hortonsphere vessels) and the development and commercialization of the floating roof by John H. Wiggins, which revolutionized petroleum storage by improving safety, reducing evaporation losses, and minimizing tank corrosion. As such, CB&I supported the expansion of oil exploration outside the US, starting operations in South America in 1924, in Asia two years later and in the Middle East in 1939. Also in the 1920s, CB&I entered into licensing agreements with European counterparts like Motherwell Bridge & Engineering Ltd. and Whessoe Ltd.

During the 1930s and 1940s, under the leadership of George Horton, CB&I transitioned from riveted to welded plate metal construction, improving structural integrity, reducing construction time, and enhancing project efficiency. Another significant development at this time was the company's entry into nuclear-related projects such as the construction of nuclear storage tanks for DuPont at Hanford, Washington.

During World War II, CB&I was selected to build Landing Ship Tanks (LSTs), which carried troops and supplies to American and Allied troops fighting in Europe and the Pacific theater. CB&I was chosen because of their reputation and skills, particularly welding. Since the coastal shipyards were busy building large vessels for the war effort, such as aircraft carriers, battleships, cruisers and destroyers, there was no alternative but to use the inland waterways and shipyards for the production of smaller ships. CB&I's Seneca, Illinois shipyard played a crucial role during the war, constructing 157 LST vessels for the US Navy. As a result of these and other wartime production activities, CB&I ranked 92nd among US corporations in the value of World War II military production contracts.

Following World War II, CB&I transitioned from wartime shipbuilding to peacetime industrial projects, adapting to post-war market demands. The company underwent a transformative period marked by significant achievements in nuclear engineering and technological innovation. One notable project of this era was a 225-foot-diameter containment vessel CB&I constructed at the Knolls Atomic Power Laboratory in West Milton, New York, which was used to test the atomic reactor for a prototype nuclear submarine. In 1955, CB&I connected a nuclear engine to the commercial electrical grid, marking the first instance of nuclear energy being generated and sold commercially. That same year CB&I erected liquid oxygen spheres at Cape Canaveral to support the US space program that eventually put a man on the moon. In 1960, CB&I built the world's first large, liquefied natural gas (LNG) tank in Lake Charles, Louisiana.

By 1967, one third of CB&I's business was outside the US, with subsidiaries operating across Europe, the Middle East, Africa, and Asia. Some notable projects from this time include refineries in Nigeria, wind tunnels in Canada, and oil terminals in Hong Kong. In 1969, CB&I introduced innovative offshore oil storage with "Khazzan Dubai No. 1", which was constructed onshore and towed to the site using a cushion of air, demonstrating novel deployment techniques for underwater oil storage. The National Society of Professional Engineers recognized the project alongside the Apollo Moon Project as one of the outstanding engineering achievements of the year.

Jim Maher was named Director of Research in 1977. Under his leadership, the company's research efforts focused on enhancing materials, methods, and designs. One notable study was conducted jointly by CBI and Standard Oil with the goal to more accurately predict hydrocarbon emissions from floating roof tanks. Also in 1977, the company went public listing their shares on the New York Stock exchange under the ticker CBI. In 1979, shareholders approved a reorganization to create CBI Industries, Inc. CBI Industries became the parent company, with Chicago Bridge & Iron Company as its wholly owned subsidiary.

In August 1984, CBI Industries acquired Liquid Carbonic Corporation, the world's largest supplier of carbon dioxide used in food and healthcare markets.

CB&I was acquired by Praxair in 1996; Praxair retained the carbon dioxide business and CB&I spun off its engineering and construction business in a 1997 IPO.

=== 2000-present ===
In 2000, CB&I acquired Howe-Baker Engineers, a company specializing in process technologies for the hydrocarbon processing industry. In 2001, CB&I acquired PDM's engineered construction and water storage divisions. Also in 2001, CB&I headquarters moved from Chicago to The Woodlands, Texas. In 2003, the company bought John Brown Hydrocarbons, renaming it at first CB&I John Brown, and later CB&I UK Limited.

The firm acquired Lummus Global from ABB on November 19, 2007, adding approximately 3,000 employees and expanding CB&I's technological capabilities and global reach for the energy and petrochemical industries. In 2010, CB&I acquired Shell's Coal Gasification Technology (CDTECH), including patents, intellectual property, and technology licenses related to coal gasification. In 2012, CB&I Technology (formerly Lummus) was awarded a contract by Indian petrochemicals major, Reliance Industries, to provide paraxylene (P-Xylene) (PX) technology for an aromatics complex in India. The complex was started up in April 2017, making Reliance the world's second largest producer of paraxylene.

In 2012, CB&I agreed to buy The Shaw Group for about US$3 billion, completing the acquisition in February 2013. The deal expanded CB&I's capabilities in the nuclear, power, and industrial sectors. Despite initial strategic gains from the Shaw Group acquisition, CB&I faced challenges related to project delays, cost overruns, and legal disputes largely related to the construction of two Westinghouse AP1000 reactor units at Plant Vogtle in Waynesboro, GA. The subsidiary that was formed as a result, CB&I Stone Webster—a result of The Shaw Group's earlier acquisition of Stone & Webster during its bankruptcy—was again sold, in January 2016, to Westinghouse Electric Co., for US$229 million.

For 2017, revenue for CB&I was US$6.7 billion, down from the year before. In August 2017, CB&I announced its intent to sell its Technology business to focus on its core EPC and fabrication services. Also in 2017, the company was forced to close Chicago Bridge & Iron Beaumont due to damages from Hurricane Harvey. The following year, CB&I sold the work yard to the Port of Beaumont.

In May 2018, the company was acquired by McDermott International for US$6 billion. After being acquired by McDermott, CB&I's stock ceased being listed on the NYSE on May 11, 2018. Gary P. Luquette was the chairman of the combined company. During its ownership, McDermott made a number of divestments, including a US$1 billion deal for its own storage tank business and US pipe fabrication business. McDermott also sold the company's Woodlands headquarters. McDermott struggled to integrate its acquisition of CB&I, and in January 2020 was facing bankruptcy. On January 21, 2020, McDermott announced that it had filed for Chapter 11 bankruptcy.

In 2024, a consortium of investors led by Mason Capital acquired CB&I from McDermott International for US$475 million of proceeds before taxes and transaction expenses. CB&I's 4,000 employees in 30 locations across North America, the Middle East and Asia were expected to remain with the business operations following the transaction. CB&I moved its headquarters back to The Woodlands, Texas.

In December 2025, it was announced that CB&I had reached an agreement to acquire the Asset Solutions business of Petrofac in the United Kingdom.

The agreement closed on April 9, 2026 with approximately 3,000 Petrofac employees joining CB&I. The acquisition furthers CB&I's expansion into integrated services, strengthens client relationships, and creates new opportunities for growth in international markets. The deal further diversifies CB&I's revenue by adding a reimbursable contracting model that helps to mitigate cyclicality and extend its services beyond the traditional lump-sum EPC portfolio.

Following the acquisition, CB&I operates as one company with two global business units, CB&I Asset Solutions based in Aberdeen, Scotland, and CB&I Storage Solutions, based in The Woodlands, Texas. Each unit maintains its own delivery accountability while leveraging CB&I's corporate functions for strategic coordination and operational support.

Corporate headquarters are located in The Woodlands, Texas.

== Operations ==
CB&I Storage Solutions functions as a global organization segmented into three main regional divisions. Each operates independently, managing its own profit and loss while delivering a full range of the company's products and services.

The Non-Union Operations division focuses on non-union regions within the US, Latin America and the Caribbean. With operational centers across the region, this division emphasizes high-volume municipal water projects and serves industrial sectors such as liquefied natural gas (LNG) and petrochemicals. Fabrication sites in Clive, Iowa, and Houston enable the delivery of solutions for regional needs.

CB&I's Union Operations for the US and Canada are headquartered in Plainfield, Illinois. This division handles union-based projects, with a presence in strategic locations such as Everett, Washington, New Castle, Delaware, as well as Edmonton and Calgary. It is particularly active in nuclear projects, ensuring adherence to industry regulations and standards.

The Europe, Africa, Middle East, Asia Pacific and Australia Operations division is based in Dubai, United Arab Emirates. Offices located in Thailand, Seoul, Perth, and Brisbane help CB&I engage with regional market opportunities.

CB&I Asset Solutions, based in Aberdeen Scotland, operates 12 assets globally, ensuring their safe, reliable operations while freeing asset owners to focus on strategic priorities, rather than daily operations. Asset Solutions also supports well operations, late life asset management, decommissioning, brownfield modification and engineering consulting. Asset Solutions global reach is anchored by operational centers in Aberdeen and Woking in the UK, Perth and Brisbane in Australia, and Houston in the US, complemented by offices across Europe, the Middle East, Asia Pacific, and Africa.

As of 2026, CB&I's product and service lines are:

- Water Storage: CB&I Storage Solutions designs and constructs water storage solutions including reservoirs, water tanks, and facilities for water distribution systems.
- Low Temperature and Cryogenic Storage: CB&I Storage Solutions specializes in the design and fabrication of tanks for storing liquefied gases at extremely low temperatures, such as LNG and other cryogenic liquids.
- High Pressure Storage: CB&I Storage Solutions manufactures high-pressure storage vessels that are used for storing liquefied gasses at elevated pressures for industries such as oil and gas, petrochemicals, and industrial gases.
- Specialty Plate Structures: CB&I Storage Solutions constructs specialty plate structures tailored to specific industrial applications, including wastewater treatment vessels, bulk storage bins, silos, and other customized industrial components.
- Atmospheric Storage: CB&I Storage Solutions constructs ambient storage tanks for a wide range of liquids and gases that do not require cryogenic or high-pressure handling for use in industries such as petrochemicals, water treatment, and food processing.
- Storage Terminals and Process Facilities: CB&I Storage Solutions designs, engineers, constructs and commissions process and storage terminals. These facilities integrate storage tanks with process equipment, piping systems, instrumentation, and control systems for operational needs of industries such as oil refining, chemical processing, and LNG production.
- Nuclear Components: CB&I Storage Solutions has constructed 130 nuclear containment vessels around the world, including 75 percent of all nuclear containment vessels in the United States. CB&I has also supplied 41 reactor pressure vessels, including eight that were field-erected, and has exceeded 10 million hours of performing repairs, modifications and maintenance to nuclear plants in operation.
- Asset Operations and Maintenance: CB&I Asset Solutions supports operations and maintenance of onshore and offshore facilities; integrity management inspection and assurance; maintenance planning, scheduling and optimization; shutdown and turnaround delivery; production efficiency and performance improvement.
- Wells and Subsurface: CB&I Asset Solutions supports customers across the lifecycle of wells and associated infrastructure, from early subsurface evaluation and well design through operations, integrity management and end-of-life plugging and abandonment (P&A).
- Late Life Asset Management and Decommissioning: CB&I Asset Solutions supports asset owners at the start of operations, managing aging assets and integrating new assets, and helps reduce decommissioning costs and supports safe removal of onshore and offshore assets.
- Projects and Brownfield Modifications: CB&I Asset Solutions focuses on guiding customers through the modification and upgrades that will improve safety, compliance and performance while deferring major capital investment, such as cessation of production and decommissioning liabilities.
- Engineering and Consulting: CB&I Asset Solutions provides critical guidance during the early project stages, evaluating the technical and commercial viability of projects. This can include feasibility, pre-FEED and FEED studies, detailed engineering and preparation for execution.

== Major projects ==
Major projects include:

- World's largest liquid hydrogen tank at NASA's Kennedy Space Center in Florida
- First full containment LNG tank on Das Island
- Largest North Sea offshore platform (Phillips 66 Maureen Oil Platform) in Hunterston, Scotland
- Khazzan Offshore Storage Tanks
- World's first LNG Peak Shaving Plant in 1965
- First environmental test chamber for NASA's Gemini program
- World's largest environmental test chamber in 1961
- World's first double-wall LNG storage tank in 1958
- World's first welded Waterspheroid elevated water tank in 1954
- World's largest self-supporting sphere (nuclear containment) in 1952
- World's first welded Watersphere elevated water tank in 1939
- Construction of the world's first full-scale aeronautical wind tunnel in 1931
- World's first Hortonspheroid in 1930
- World's first liquid storage sphere in 1923
- World's first floating roof in 1923
- Construction of first elevated water tank with full hemispherical bottom in Fort Dodge, Iowa in 1894
- LNG liquefaction plant in Pampa Melchorita, Peru
- Natural gas processing and treating complex in Cabinda Province, Angola
- Crude vacuum and decoking unit expansion project for a refinery in Kansas, US
- Golden Pass LNG import terminal near Sabine Pass, Texas, US
- Large tankage facility at Shell Pearl GTL, Qatar
- Hydrotreating and sulfur removal/recovery facilities for several major US refiners
- A US$775 million LNG re-gasification terminal at Quintero Bay, Chile
- Cat gas hydrotreater (CGHT) in El Paso, Texas, US
- Hydrogen generation plant in Benicia, California, US
- Propane dehydrogenation unit in Houston, Texas, US
- Multiple Middle East storage facilities and
- Oil sands storage tanks in Alberta, Canada
- 150 wind turbine towers for wind farms in the western United States (2004)
- Petrochemicals expansion project in Geismar, Louisiana, including the license and basic engineering for ethylene technology (2012)

=== Historic structures ===
The company built bridges and other works of historic importance, including some listed on the US National Register of Historic Places. These works include (with varying attribution):

- Boiling Nuclear Superheater (BONUS) Reactor Facility, Punta Higuero Sector, PR 413, Rincon, Puerto Rico (Chicago Bridge Co. Nuclear Engineering), NRHP-listed
- Bunnell Water Tower, 100 Utility Street, Bunnell, FL 32110, Bunnell, Florida (Chicago Bridge & Iron Co.), NRHP-listed
- One or more works in the Caplinger Mills Historic District, junction of Washington Ave. and the Sac River, Caplinger Mills, Missouri (Chicago Bridge Co.), NRHP-listed
- Embarras River Bridge, Wade Township Rd. 164 over Embarras River, Newton, Illinois (Chicago Bridge Co.), NRHP-listed
- Evansville Standpipe, 288 N. 4th St., Evansville, Wisconsin (Chicago Bridge & Iron Co.), NRHP-listed
- Frank's Ford Bridge, County Road 121, Oronoco, Minnesota (Chicago Bridge & Iron Co.), NRHP-listed
- Hartford Water Tower, Pine & 1st. Sts., Hartford, Arkansas (Chicago Bridge & Iron Co.), NRHP-listed
- Hughes Water Tower, Church St., Hughes, Arkansas (Chicago Bridge & Iron Works Co.), NRHP-listed
- Lake Ditch Bridge, junction of Lake Ditch and Lake Ditch Rd., Monrovia, Indiana (Chicago Bridge and Iron Co.), NRHP-listed
- Mahned Bridge, Mahned Rd. over the Leaf River, New Augusta, Mississippi (Chicago Bridge and Iron Company), NRHP-listed
- Manning Water Tower, 620 3rd St., Manning, Iowa (Chicago Bridge and Iron Co.), NRHP-listed
- McCrory Waterworks, junction of N. Fakes and W. Third, McCrory, Arkansas (Chicago Bridge & Iron Works), NRHP-listed
- Mill Race Bridge, Pheasant Rd. over Turkey River, West Union, Iowa (Chicago Bridge and Iron Co.), NRHP-listed
- Monette Water Tower, SW. corner junction of AR 139 & Texie Ave., Monette, Arkansas (Chicago Bridge & Iron), NRHP-listed
- Otranto Bridge, 480th Ave. over Big Cedar River, St. Ansgar, Iowa (Chicago Bridge and Iron Company), NRHP-listed
- Tyronza Water Tower, NW of junction of Main St. and Oliver St., Tyronza, Arkansas (Chicago Bridge & Iron Works), NRHP-listed
- Water Street/Darden Road Bridge, Over St. Joseph River at Darden Rd., South Bend, Indiana (Chicago Bridge & Iron Co.), NRHP-listed
- West Water Tower and Ground Storage Tank, 310 11th Ave., Orion, Illinois (Chicago Bridge & Iron), NRHP-listed

=== World War II ===
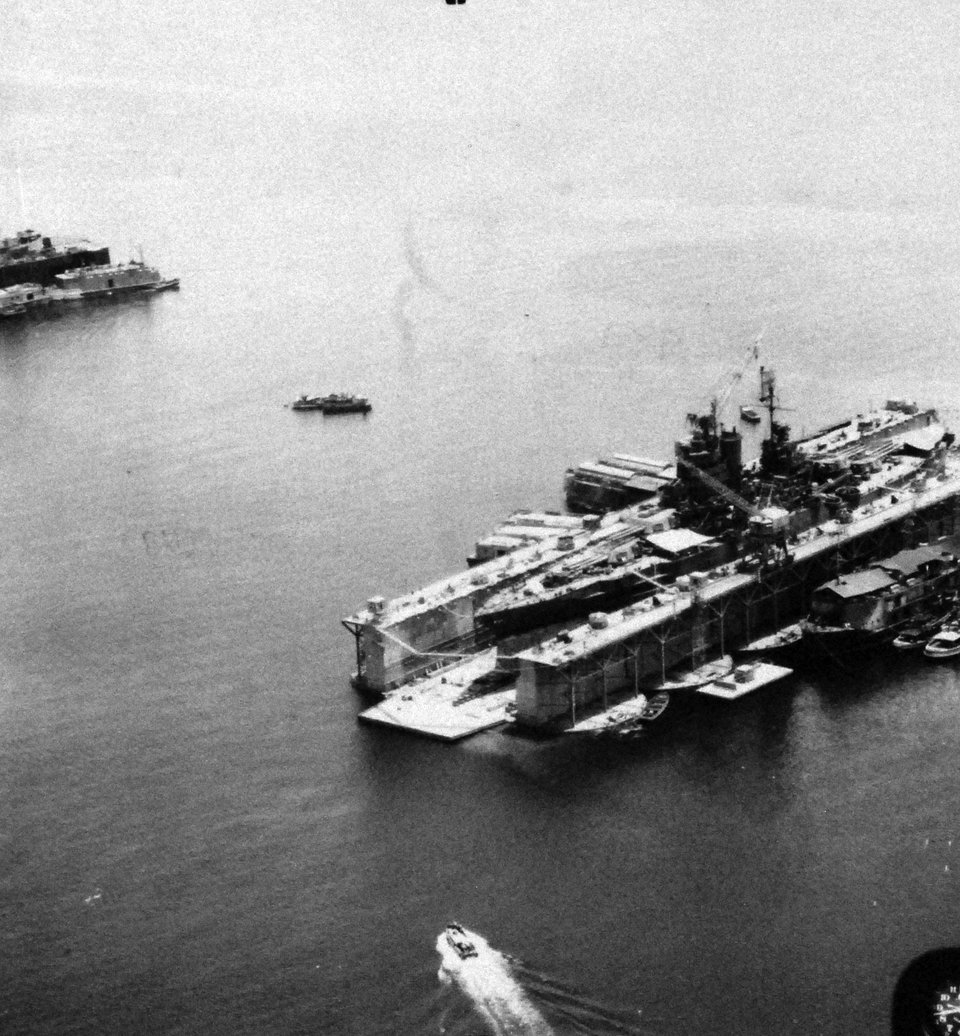
ABSD-5 at Manicani Island, Philippines repairing the USS Mississippi in July 1945

There was a great demand for ships and US Navy vessels during World War II. For the war Chicago Bridge built in its Eureka, California shipyard Medium Auxiliary Floating Dry Docks ( or AFDM). These could repair ships in remote locations and could be moved as more actions were needed during the war. Chicago Bridge also had shipyards in: Seneca, Illinois; Newburgh, New York; and Morgan City, Louisiana.

- AFDB-5 (A-G), scrapped in 1997
- USS Los Alamos (AFDB-7) (A-G), sold to private shipyard in 1995
- USS Richland (AFDM-8), later called YFD 64, scrapped in 2016
- USS AFDM-9, also called YFD 65, sold to private use in 1989
- USS Resolute (AFDM-10), also called YFD 67, leased to Todd Pacific Shipyards, 2004
- USS AFDM-11, also called YFD 68, sold to private use in 2004
- Six floating crane barges
- USS AFDM-1 YFD 3, was floated through the Panama Canal on its side, and scrapped in 1986
- USS AFDM-3 through the Panama Canal on its side, YFD 6, sold to private use
- USS AFDM-4 YFD 10 sold to private use in 1948
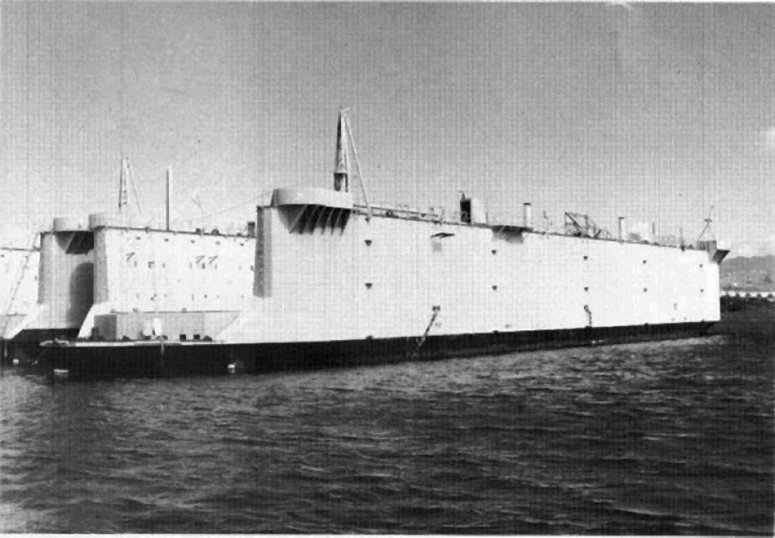
  USS Adept (AFD-23)
- USS Endeavor AFD-1 – AFDL-1
- USS AFD-2
- USS AFD-3 – AFDL-3
- USS AFD-4 – AFDL-4
- USS AFD-5 – AFDL-5
- USS Dynamic (AFD-6) – AFDL-6
- USS Ability (AFD-7)
- USS AFD-8 – AFDL-8
- USS AFD-9 – AFDL-9
- USS AFD-10 – AFDL-10
- USS AFD-11 – AFDL-11

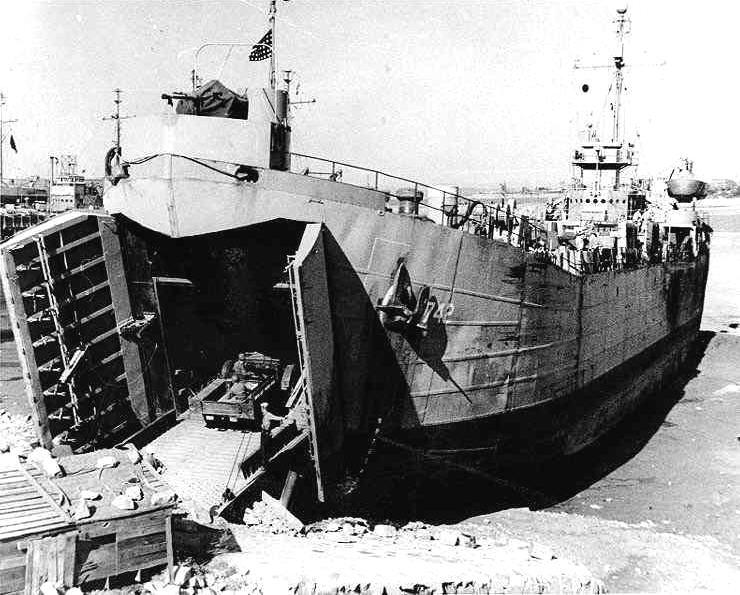
A LST unloading

- LST

Built: LST-197 to LST-136; LST-511 to LST-522; LST-600 to LST-652; LST-777 to LST-774; and LST-1115 to LST-1152. Examples: USS Bamberg County, USS LST-230, USS LST-231 / USS Atlas, USS Caddo Parish, USS Calaveras County, USS LST-511, USS Burnett County, USS LST-517, USS Calhoun County, USS Cape May County, USS Clarke County, USS Clearwater County, USS Coconino County, USS LST-607, USS LST-1115 / USS Pentheus, and USS LST-1116 / USS Proserpine.

- Barges: YFN-611, YFN-612, and YFN-613
- Floating derrick cranes: YD-120 and YD-121
- Tank barge: DPC-408 to DPC-419, to transport liquids.

== Controversy ==
CB&I was revealed as a subscriber to the UK's Consulting Association, exposed in 2009 for operating an illegal construction industry blacklist; CB&I was one of 14 companies issued with enforcement notices by the UK Information Commissioner's Office. A CB&I employee consulted the blacklist more than 900 times in 2007 alone, a 2010 employment tribunal was told.
