= Monette Water Tower =

- U.S. National Register of Historic Places
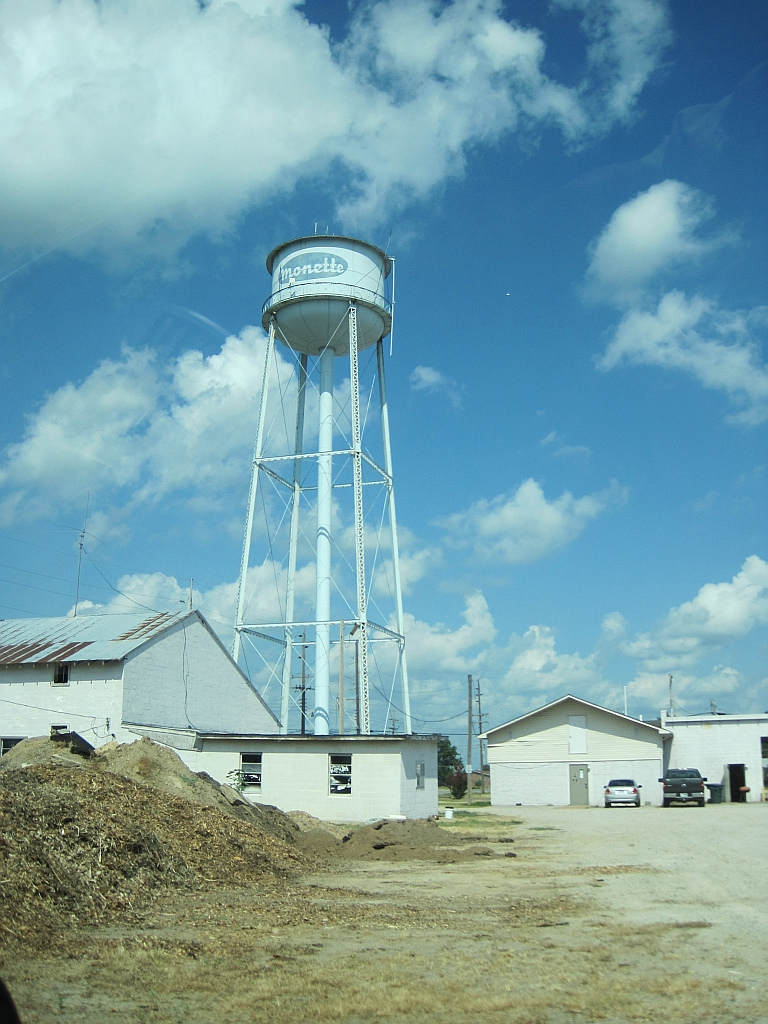

- Location within Arkansas Location within the United States
- Location: SW. corner Jct. of AR 139 & Texie Ave., Monette, Arkansas
- Coordinates: 35°53′38″N 90°20′35″W
- Area: less than one acre
- Built: 1936
- Built by: Chicago Bridge & Iron Company, Public Works Administration
- Architectural style: Plain-Traditional
- MPS: New Deal Recovery Efforts in Arkansas MPS
- NRHP reference No.: 07001424
- Added to NRHP: January 24, 2008

The Monette Water Tower is a historic structure located at the junction of Arkansas Highway 139 and Texie Avenue in Monette, Arkansas. It was built in 1936 by the Chicago Bridge & Iron Company in conjunction with the Public Works Administration as part of a project to improve the area's water supply. The Monette Water Tower is considered a good example of a 1930s-era elevated steel water tank. It was added to the National Register of Historic Places in 2008, as part of a multiple-property listing that included numerous other New Deal-era projects throughout Arkansas.

== See also ==
- Cotter Water Tower
- Hampton Waterworks
- Mineral Springs Waterworks
- National Register of Historic Places listings in Craighead County, Arkansas
- Waldo Water Tower (Waldo, Arkansas)
