= Manning Water Tower =

- U.S. National Register of Historic Places
- Location within Iowa Location within the United States
- Location: 620 3rd St. Manning, Iowa
- Coordinates: 41°54′31.8″N 95°03′47.5″W
- Area: less than one acre
- Built: 1903
- Built by: Chicago Bridge and Iron Co.
- Architect: Anson Marston
- NRHP reference No.: 16000296
- Added to NRHP: May 31, 2016

The Manning Water Tower is a historic structure located in Manning, Iowa, United States. It is significant as a good example of early 20th-century steel elevated water tower design, and its association with Anson Marston and the Chicago Bridge & Iron Company. Marston, who designed the structure, was a professor of engineering at Iowa State College. Manning native Henry J. Brunnier, who studied under Marston, convinced the city council to use one of Marston's designs rather than a less expensive standpipe. He also assisted with this water tower's design, and went on to career as a civil engineer in San Francisco. Also involved in the tower's design was the Chicago Bridge & Iron Company, who built it in 1903. It replaced a pump house with a steam-powered engine and a large water tank that was built near the town's well in 1894. The water tower is 140.75 feet (42.90 m) tall. It has a 60,000-US-gallon (230 kl) steel tank, with a cast-iron center pipe, and four steel legs. The superstructure rests on concrete piers with limestone capstones, and the tank is capped with a pagoda-shaped roof. The water tower was listed on the National Register of Historic Places in 2016.
