= Cotton Plant water tower =

- U.S. National Register of Historic Places
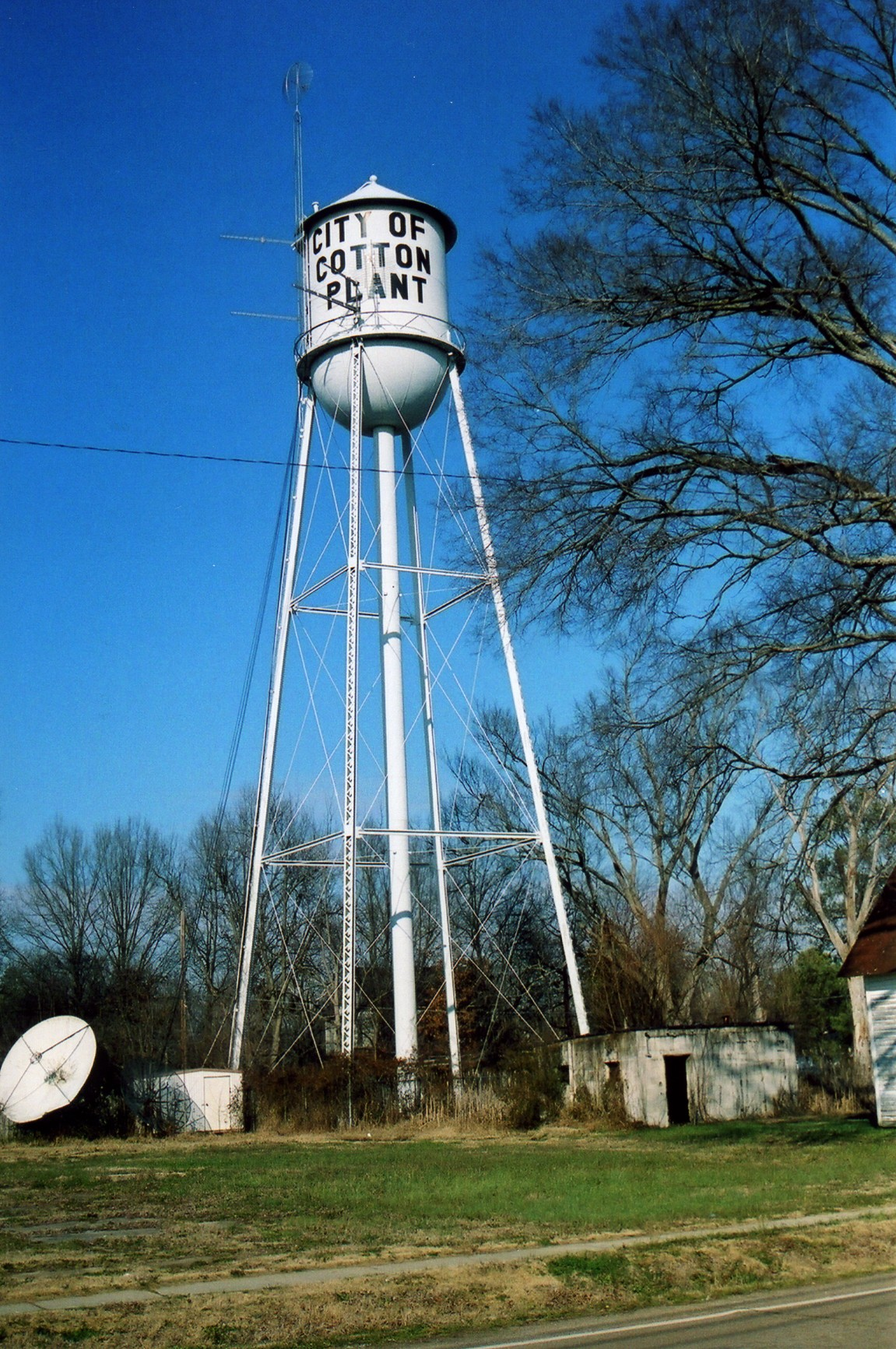

- Location within Arkansas Location within the United States
- Location: Jct. of N. Main & N. Vine Sts., Cotton Plant, Arkansas
- Coordinates: 35°0′18″N 91°14′54″W
- Area: less than one acre
- Built: 1935
- Built by: Pittsburgh-Des Moines Steel Company
- Architectural style: Plain-Traditional
- MPS: New Deal Recovery Efforts in Arkansas MPS
- NRHP reference No.: 08000490
- Added to NRHP: June 4, 2008

The Cotton Plant water tower is a historic elevated steel water tower located in Cotton Plant, Arkansas. It was built in 1935 by the Pittsburgh-Des Moines Steel Company in conjunction with the Public Works Administration as part of a project to improve the area's water supply. It was added to the National Register of Historic Places in 2008, as part of a multiple-property listing that included numerous other New Deal-era projects throughout Arkansas.

== See also ==
- Cotter water tower
- Hampton Waterworks
- McCrory Waterworks
- Mineral Springs Waterworks
- National Register of Historic Places listings in Woodruff County, Arkansas
- Waldo Water Tower (Waldo, Arkansas)
