= USS LST-511 =

1943 LST-491-class tank landing ship

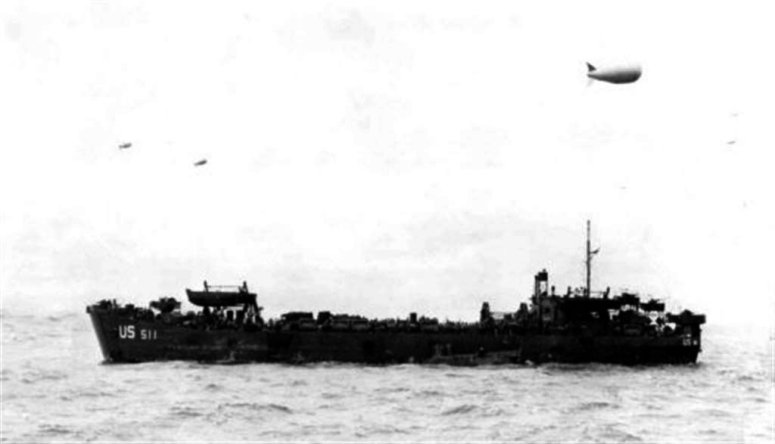
- USS LST-511 off Omaha Beach, on D-Day, 6 June 1944

History

United States
- Name: LST-511
- Builder: Chicago Bridge & Iron Company, Seneca, Illinois
- Laid down: 22 July 1943
- Launched: 30 November 1943
- Commissioned: 3 January 1944
- Decommissioned: 19 December 1945
- Stricken: 8 January 1946
- Identification: Hull symbol: LST-511; Code letters: NDYD; IMO number: 5138656
- Honours and awards: 1 × battle stars
- Fate: Sold, 17 February 1948, foundered 1992

General characteristics
- Class & type: LST-491-class tank landing ship
- Displacement: 1,625 long tons (1,651 t) (light); 4,080 long tons (4,145 t) (full (seagoing draft with 1,675 short tons (1,520 t) load)
- Length: 328 ft (100 m) oa
- Beam: 50 ft (15 m)
- Draft: Unloaded: 2 ft 4 in (0.71 m) forward; 7 ft 6 in (2.29 m) aft; Full load: 8 ft 2 in (2.49 m) forward; 14 ft 1 in (4.29 m) aft; Landing with 500 short tons (450 t) load: 3 ft 11 in (1.19 m) forward; 9 ft 10 in (3.00 m) aft
- Installed power: 2 × 900 hp (670 kW) General Motors 12-567A diesel engines, 1,700 shp (1,300 kW)
- Propulsion: 1 × Falk main reduction gears; 2 × screws
- Speed: 11.6 kn (21.5 km/h; 13.3 mph)
- Range: 24,000 nmi (44,000 km; 28,000 mi) at 9 kn (17 km/h; 10 mph) while displacing 3,960 long tons (4,024 t)
- Boats & landing craft carried: 1 x LCT
- Capacity: 1,600–1,900 st (22,000–27,000 lb; 10,000–12,000 kg) cargo depending on mission
- Troops: 16 officers, 147 enlisted men
- Complement: 16 officers, 147 enlisted men
- Armament: 2 × twin 40 mm (1.6 in) Bofors guns; 4 × single 40mm Bofors guns; 12 × 20 mm (0.79 in) Oerlikon cannons

USS LST-511 was an LST-491-class tank landing ship built for the United States Navy during World War II.

== Construction ==
LST-511 was laid down on 22 July 1943, at Seneca, Illinois, by the Chicago Bridge & Iron Company; launched on 30 November 1943; sponsored by Mrs. James V. Gaynor; and commissioned on 3 January 1944.

== Service history ==
During World War II, LST-511 was assigned to the European Theater and participated in the invasion of Normandy in June 1944. LST-511 was one of the eight LSTs participating in "Exercise Tiger", a practice for D-Day on 28 April, during which German E-boats attacked, hitting three of the eight LSTs. Two sank immediately and the third was towed to port by its own LCVPs. Designated as a hospital ship for the invasion with two doctors and a contingent of corpsmen, she completed 50 round trips from English ports to the Normandy beaches.

Upon her return to the United States, she was decommissioned on 19 December 1945, and struck from the Naval Vessel Register on 8 January 1946. On 17 February 1948 the ship was sold to the Anglo-Canadian Pulp & Paper Mills of Quebec, Canada, for operation and renamed Guy Bartholomew. She was then subsequently purchased by Agence Maritime, and the renamed Fort Kent. She was in service into the 1970s. She foundered 7 December 1992, off Long Harbour, Newfoundland.

== Awards ==

LST-511 received one battle star for World War II service.

== See also ==
- List of United States Navy LSTs
