= USS Calaveras County =

1944 LST-491-class tank landing ship

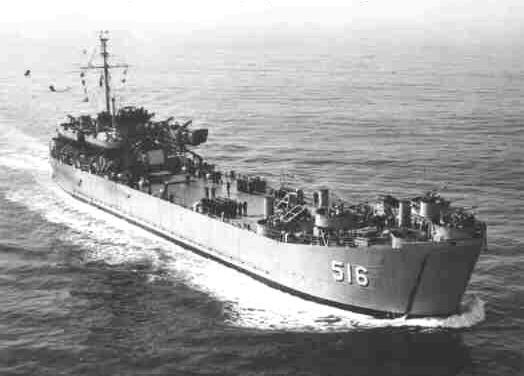
- LST-516

History

United States
- Name: USS LST-516
- Builder: Chicago Bridge & Iron Company, Seneca, Illinois
- Laid down: 6 September 1943
- Launched: 7 January 1944
- Commissioned: 31 January 1944
- Decommissioned: 28 February 1947
- Recommissioned: 22 September 1950
- Decommissioned: 21 December 1955
- Renamed: USS Calaveras County (LST-516), 1 July 1955
- Stricken: 1 October 1958
- Honours and awards: 1 battle star (WWII); 4 battle stars (Korea)

General characteristics
- Class & type: LST-491-class tank landing ship
- Displacement: 1,625 long tons (1,651 t) light; 3,640 long tons (3,698 t) full
- Length: 328 ft (100 m)
- Beam: 50 ft (15 m)
- Draft: Unloaded : 2 ft 4 in (0.71 m) forward; 7 ft 6 in (2.29 m) aft; Loaded : 8 ft 2 in (2.49 m) forward; 14 ft 1 in (4.29 m) aft
- Depth: 8 ft (2.4 m) forward; 14 ft 4 in (4.37 m) aft (full load)
- Propulsion: 2 × General Motors 12-567 diesel engines, two shafts, twin rudders
- Speed: 12 knots (22 km/h; 14 mph)
- Boats & landing craft carried: 3 LCVPs 1 Captains gig.
- Troops: Approximately 130 officers and enlisted men
- Complement: 8–10 officers, 89–100 enlisted men
- Armament: 1 × single 3-inch/50-caliber gun mount; 8 × 40 mm guns; 12 × 20 mm guns

USS Calaveras County (LST-516) was an LST-491-class tank landing ship built for the United States Navy during World War II. Named for Calaveras County, California, she was the only U.S. Naval vessel to bear the name.

LST-516 was laid down on 6 September 1943 at Seneca, Illinois, by the Chicago Bridge & Iron Company; launched on 7 January 1944; sponsored by Mrs. R. R. Hansen; and commissioned on 31 January 1944.

== Service history ==
During World War II, LST-516 was assigned to the European Theater and participated in the Invasion of Normandy in June, 1944. On 28 February 1947 she was decommissioned and, as a result of hostilities in Korea, recommissioned on 22 September 1950. She served in the Korean War and took part in the following campaigns: U.N. Summer-Fall Offensive (November, 1951); Second Korean Winter (January and February, 1952); Third Korean Winter (December, 1952 and January through April, 1953); Korea, Summer 1953 (June through July, 1953). Immediately following the Korean War, she continued to serve in the Korean area until 20 September 1953. Following her Korean service, she returned to the United States. She was named USS Calaveras County (LST-516) on 1 July 1955. On 21 December 1955 the ship was decommissioned and struck from the Naval Vessel Register on 1 October 1958. Her final fate is unknown.

LST-516 received one battle star for World War II service and four battle stars for Korean War service.
