= Embarras River Bridge =

- U.S. National Register of Historic Places
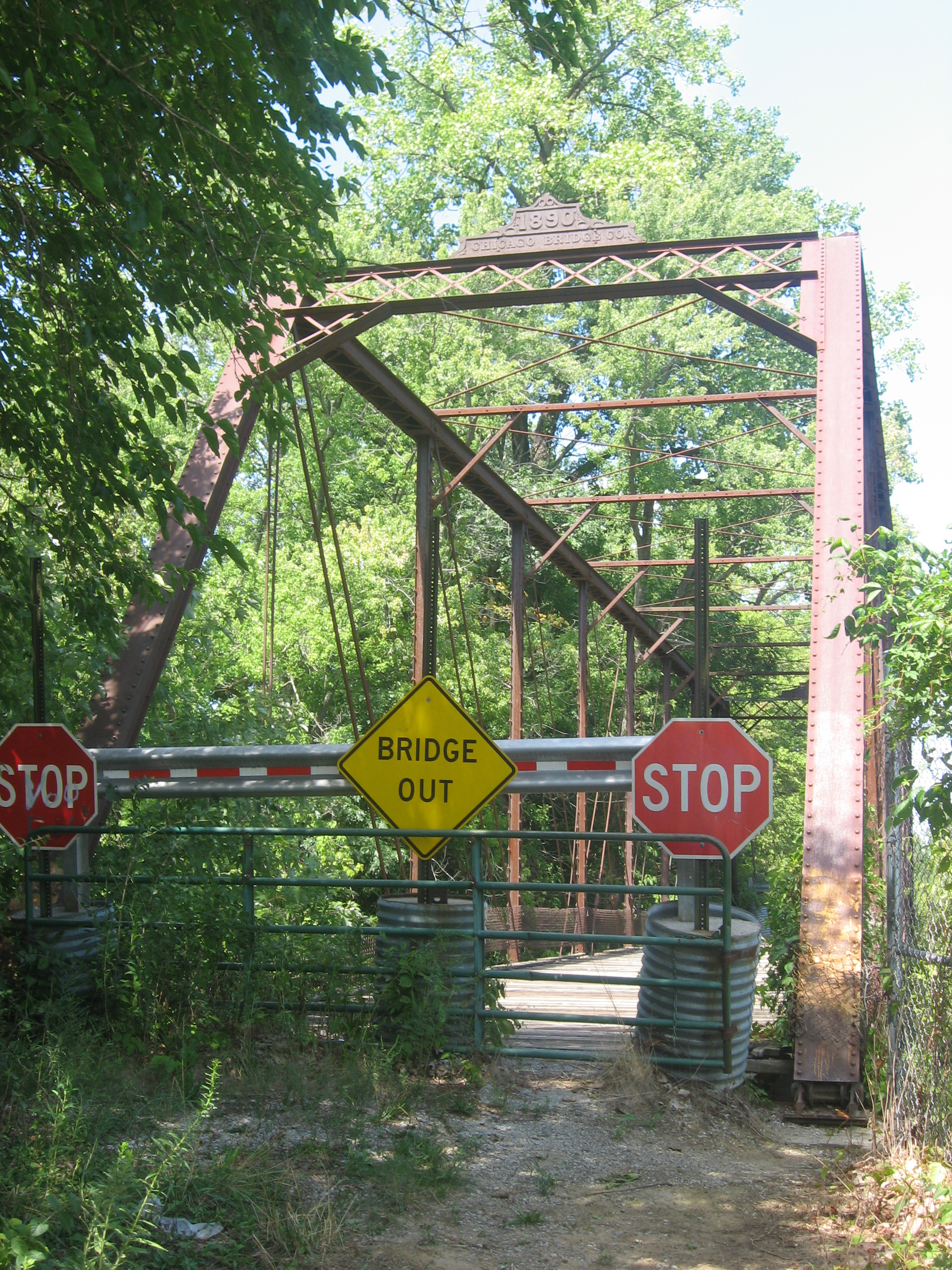
- Southern portal of the bridge

- Location within Illinois Location within the United States
- Location: Wade Township Rd. 164 over the Embarras River at Newton, Illinois
- Nearest city: Newton
- Coordinates: 38°59′17″N 88°9′52″W
- Area: Less than 1 acre (0.40 ha)
- Built: 1890
- Built by: Chicago Bridge Co.
- Architectural style: Pratt through truss
- NRHP reference No.: 98000472
- Added to NRHP: May 20, 1998

The Embarras River Bridge is a bridge in Jasper County, Illinois, which carries Wade Township Road 164 across the Embarras River. The south end of the bridge is in the city of Newton, while the northern end is in Wade Township. The Pratt through truss bridge was built in 1890 by the Chicago Bridge & Iron Company to replace a derelict wooden bridge. At 148 feet (45 m) in length, the bridge is relatively long for a Pratt truss bridge. The bridge is the only Pratt through truss bridge in the county and is one of the oldest truss bridges of any type in the state.

The bridge was added to the National Register of Historic Places on May 20, 1998.

In 2014 renovations began to make the bridge into a biking and walking trail called Eagle Trails. Remodling was completed in 2015 and is open to the public.
