= USS Bamberg County =

US Navy tank landing ship

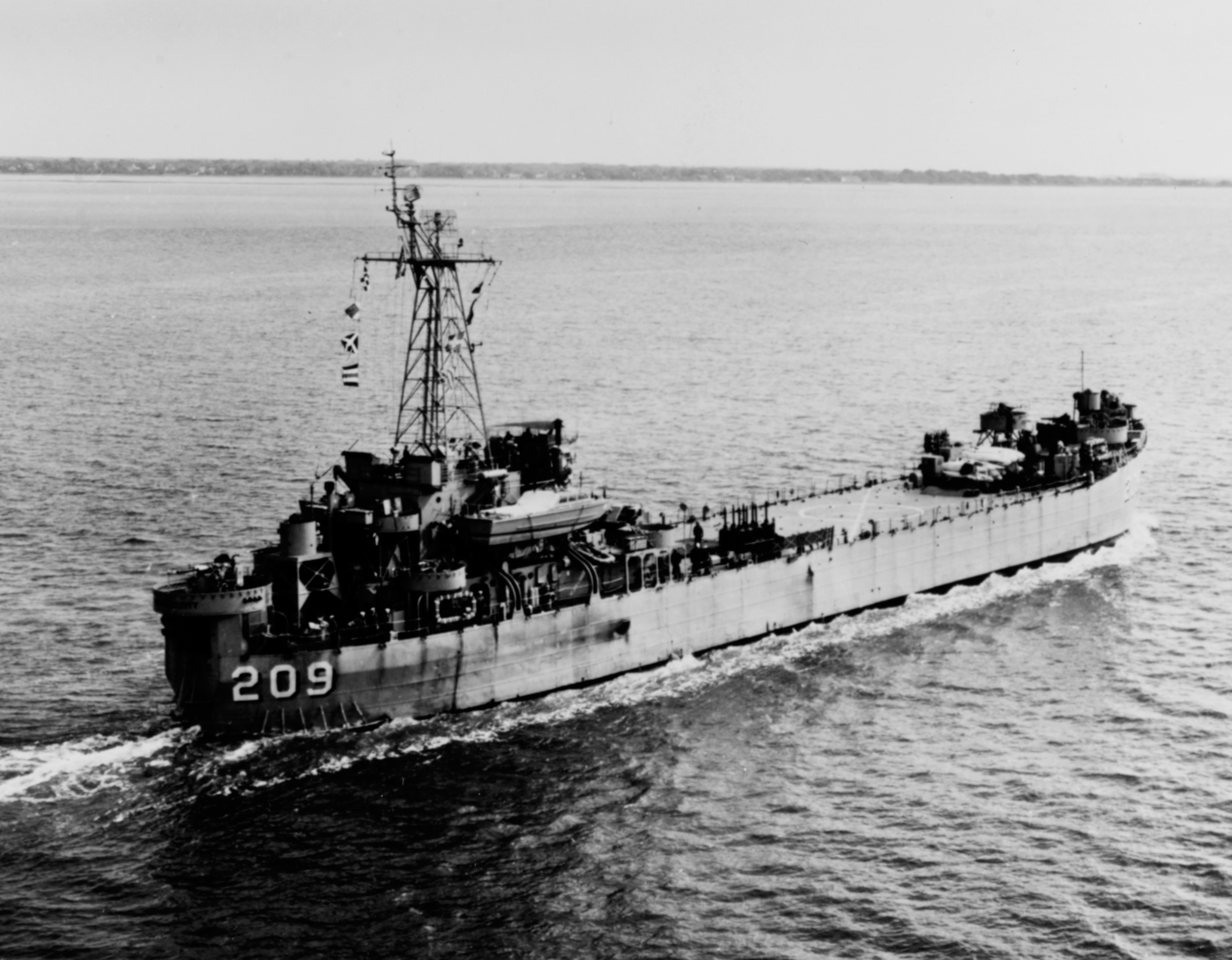
- USS Bamberg County underway in the 1960s

History

United States
- Name: LST-209
- Builder: Chicago Bridge and Iron Company, Seneca
- Laid down: 7 September 1942
- Launched: 29 May 1943
- Sponsored by: Mrs. C. A. Dalton
- Commissioned: 10 June 1943
- Decommissioned: 27 June 1946
- Renamed: USNS T-LST-209, 19 June 1951
- In service: 19 June 1951
- Out of service: 5 August 1951
- Renamed: USS LST-209, 24 August 1951
- Reclassified: LST-209, 24 August 1951
- Recommissioned: 24 August 1951
- Renamed: USS Bamberg County (LST-209), 1 July 1955
- Namesake: Bamberg County, South Carolina
- Decommissioned: 10 December 1956
- Stricken: 1 November 1958
- Fate: Scrapped

General characteristics
- Class & type: LST-1-class tank landing ship
- Displacement: 1,625 tons (light), 4,080 tons (full)
- Length: 328 ft (100.0 m)
- Beam: 50 ft (15.2 m)
- Draft: 2 ft 4 in (0.71 m) fwd, 7 ft 6 in (2.29 m) aft (unloaded); 8 feet 2 inches (2.49 m) fwd, 14 feet 1 inch (4.29 m) aft (loaded)
- Depth: 8 ft (2.4 m) fwd; 14 ft 4 in (4.37 m) aft (full load)
- Propulsion: Two General Motors 12-567 diesel engines, two shafts, twin rudders
- Speed: 12 knots
- Boats & landing craft carried: Two or six LCVPs
- Troops: 14–16 officers, 131–147 enlisted men
- Complement: 7–9 officers, 104–120 enlisted men
- Armament: 2 × twin 40 mm gun mounts w/Mk. 51 directors; 4 × single 40 mm gun mounts; 12 × 20 mm gun mounts

USS LST-209 was an LST-1-class tank landing ship built for the United States Navy during World War II. Like most of the ships of her class, she was not originally named, and known only by her designation. From June to August 1951 she served a stint as a part of the Military Sea Transportation Service (MSTS), crewed by civilians, and renamed USNS T-LST-209. She was recommissioned under her original name 24 August 1951, and renamed USS Bamberg County (LST-209) on 1 July 1955. She was named for Bamberg County, South Carolina, the only U.S. Naval vessel to bear the name.

== Operational history ==
LST-209 was laid down on 7 September 1942 at Seneca, Illinois by the Chicago Bridge and Iron Company; launched on 29 May 1943; sponsored by Mrs. C. A. Dalton; placed in reduced commission at her builder's yard on 4 June 1943; placed in full commission at New Orleans on 10 June 1943.

=== World War II ===
After shakedown training in the Chesapeake Bay, LST-209 departed American waters on 4 August 1943 and steamed via the Strait of Gibraltar for the Mediterranean coast of North Africa. On her arrival at Oran, Algeria the ship received orders to proceed to Bizerte, Tunisia where she exchanged ships' companies with USS LST-378 on 25 August. Originally slated to sail for Algiers to load LST spare parts for shipment to the Far East, LST-209 instead received orders to Sicily due to the critical need for LSTs to carry equipment to the Italian front. In the months that followed, the tank landing ship conducted four trips between Catania, Sicily and Taranto, Italy, before she returned to Algiers for further assignment.

In convoy with 10 other tank landing ships, LST-209 departed the Mediterranean through the Suez Canal and headed for India. After arriving at Calcutta during the latter part of November, she loaded 14 M3 "General Lee" tanks on 3 December and embarked 67 men of the British 14th Army before departing on 5 December, with USS LST-208 and two British motor gunboats, bound for Regu Creek, near Arakan, Burma. Although LST-208 ran aground on the run in, LST-209 beached successfully at 23:24 on 6 December. She completed unloading the tanks within 30 minutes, retracted, and reached Calcutta in the afternoon of 9 December. A week later, LST-209 received orders to proceed to the British Isles. Departing Colombo on 28 December, the ship reached the Welsh port of Milford Haven on 12 February 1944 and, after a week of operational training, was drydocked at Cardiff. She next underwent additional training, including beaching exercises on the south coast of England. After shifting thence to Rosneath naval base, Rosneath, Scotland LST-209 received an armament conversion alongside destroyer tender USS Melville (AD-2), losing her single 3-inch (76 mm) gun and receiving several 40 millimeter Bofors and 20 millimeter Oerlikon antiaircraft guns.

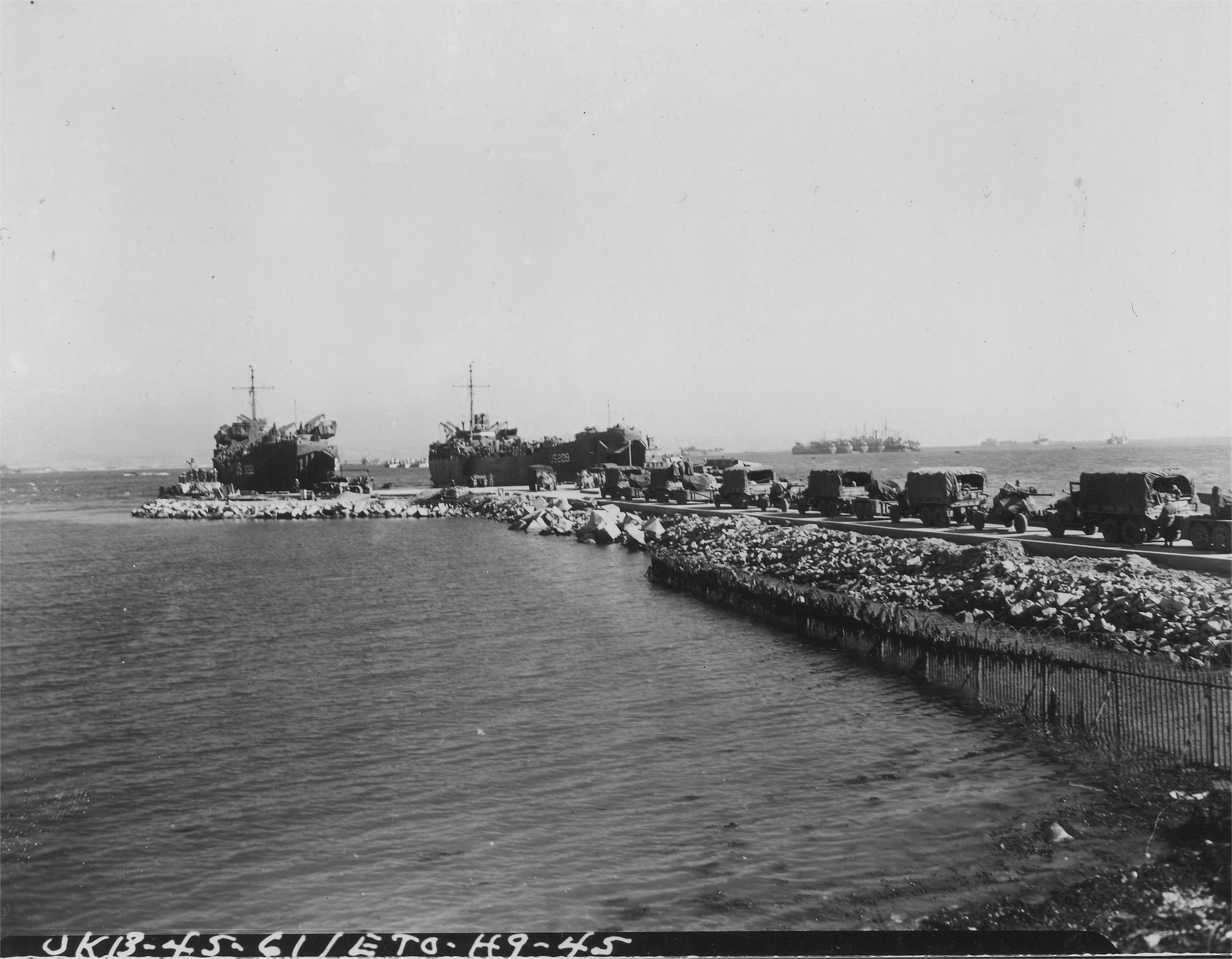
LST-209 (right) and LST-332 loading vehicles for transport to Europe, April 1945.

On completion of that refit, LST-209 sailed for Harwich, England to train for the invasion of France. She embarked various troops embarked during this period, including elements of the famed British 8th Army "the Desert Rats", the troops she carried to the continent on D-Day, 6 June 1944. After beaching on the British "Gold" Beach that day, LST-209 shuttled between French and British ports for the remainder of June to support operations in France. Reconfigured in July to lift railway cars in her capacious tank deck, LST-209 carried out this task between Southampton and Cherbourg until November 1944. From then until the German capitulation, the tank landing ship transported troops between various English ports and Le Havre and Rouen, France, and Ostend, Belgium. Following the end of the war with Germany, LST-209 received orders to return to the United States on 14 June 1945. Reaching Norfolk, Virginia on 1 July 1945 with PT-460 as cargo and former USAAF prisoners of war as passengers, LST-209 shifted from the Tidewater region of Virginia to New York where she unloaded the motor torpedo boat. She then headed back to New Orleans, whence her voyages had commenced two years before. At Mobile, Alabama work began to update her to the configuration of the improved LST-542 class, but the end of the War prompted a cancellation of some of the alterations originally planned.

=== Post-war ===
When the amended refitting had been completed by the Alabama Dry Dock and Shipbuilding Company, she proceeded to New Orleans for inspection. LST-209 then carried out shakedown training out of Galveston, Texas, before returning to New Orleans in mid-October 1945. Sent to the St. Johns River in Florida, the tank landing ship reported to the inactive fleet on 28 October 1945 and was decommissioned and placed in reserve on 27 June 1946. The ship was placed in service as USNS T-LST-209 on 19 June 1951 with a civilian crew and assigned to the Military Sea Transportation Service (MSTS), Atlantic. She participated in Project "Bluejay" that July, a cold-weather exercise that took place in Arctic waters. While she was at sea, participating in these evolutions, it was decided that the ship be reassigned to the Atlantic Fleet with a military crew when released by MSTS from her present employment. Released from MSTS service upon her arrival at Norfolk on 5 August 1951, LST-209 shifted from there to Charleston, South Carolina where she was formally turned over to the Commander, Mine Force, Atlantic, on 11 August 1951. She was then placed in commission on 24 August 1951.

As the flagship for the Commander, Mine Squadron (MinRon) 4, LST-209 resumed active operations in November 1951 after receiving such repairs and alterations as were necessary to enable her to function as a mine squadron flagship. These changes did not alter her basic tank landing ship lines. Clearing Charleston on 8 November, LST-209 took part in amphibious exercises off Onslow Beach, functioning as flagship and control ship for minesweeping operations. In the course of these evolutions, she became one of the first LST's to operate helicopters from her main deck.

For the next half decade the ship operated with the mine force based at Charleston. Her tank deck was altered in 1953 to allow the ship to function as a support vessel for MSC(0) type minesweepers. During this period, LST-209 was renamed USS Bamberg County (LST-209) on 1 July 1955. Decommissioned again at Green Cove Springs, Florida on 10 December 1956, Bamberg County never again saw active service with the Navy. Deemed "unfit for further naval service" on 28 October 1958 her name was struck from the Naval Vessel Register on 1 November 1958. Sold to Tolchester Lines, Inc., of Arlington, Virginia soon thereafter, she was acquired by the Dravo Corporation of Pittsburgh, Pennsylvania on 23 February 1961 for use at that firm's Baton Rouge, Louisiana facility, where she was eventually scrapped.

Bamberg County earned one battle star for her World War II service.

== See also ==
- List of United States Navy LSTs
