= USS Caddo Parish =

WWII US tank landing ship

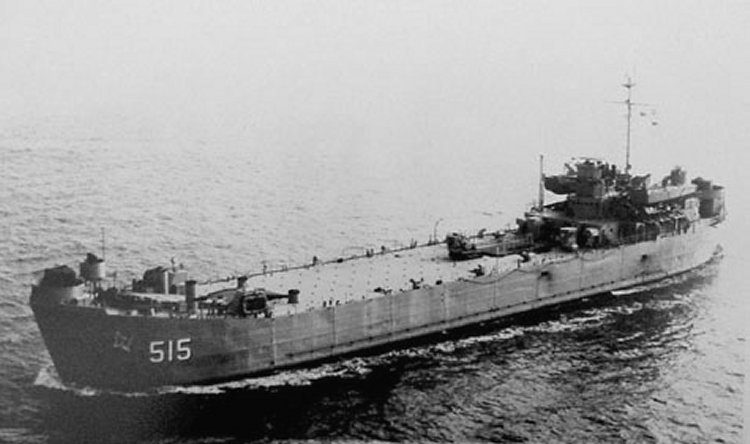
- USS Caddo Parish (LST-515) underway c. 1965

History

United States
- Name: LST-515 (1943–1955); Caddo Parish (1955–1969)
- Namesake: Caddo Parish, Louisiana
- Builder: Chicago Bridge & Iron Company, Seneca, Illinois
- Laid down: 3 September 1943
- Launched: 31 December 1943
- Commissioned: 28 January 1944
- Decommissioned: 20 October 1955
- Recommissioned: 2 August 1963
- Decommissioned: 26 November 1969
- Renamed: Caddo Parish, 1 July 1955
- Honors and awards: 1 × battle stars (WWII); 9 × battle stars, Navy Unit Commendation, Meritorious Unit Commendation (Vietnam)
- Fate: Transferred to the Philippines, 26 November 1969

Philippines
- Name: Bataan
- Namesake: Municipality of Batan, Philippines
- Acquired: 26 November 1969
- Identification: LT-85
- Fate: Unknown

General characteristics
- Class & type: LST-491-class tank landing ship
- Displacement: 1,625 long tons (1,651 t) (light); 4,080 long tons (4,145 t) (full (seagoing draft with 1,675 short tons (1,520 t) load); 2,366 long tons (2,404 t) (beaching)
- Length: 328 ft (100 m) oa
- Beam: 50 ft (15 m)
- Draft: Unloaded: 2 ft 4 in (0.71 m) forward; 7 ft 6 in (2.29 m) aft; Full load: 8 ft 3 in (2.51 m) forward; 14 ft 1 in (4.29 m) aft; Landing with 500 short tons (450 t) load: 3 ft 11 in (1.19 m) forward; 9 ft 10 in (3.00 m) aft
- Installed power: 2 × 900 hp (670 kW) Electro-Motive Diesel 12-567A diesel engines; 1,700 shp (1,300 kW)
- Propulsion: 1 × Falk main reduction gears; 2 × Propellers
- Speed: 12 kn (22 km/h; 14 mph)
- Range: 24,000 nmi (44,000 km; 28,000 mi) at 9 kn (17 km/h; 10 mph) while displacing 3,960 long tons (4,024 t)
- Boats & landing craft carried: 6 x LCVPs
- Capacity: 1,600–1,900 short tons (3,200,000–3,800,000 lb; 1,500,000–1,700,000 kg) cargo depending on mission
- Troops: 16 officers, 147 enlisted men
- Complement: 13 officers, 104 enlisted men
- Armament: Varied, ultimate armament; 2 × twin 40 mm (1.57 in) Bofors guns; 4 × single 40 mm Bofors guns; 12 × 20 mm (0.79 in) Oerlikon cannons

USS Caddo Parish, originally named LST-515, was an LST-491-class tank landing ship built for the United States Navy during World War II. Like many of her class, she was not originally named and was properly referred to by her hull designation. On 1 July 1955, she was given the name Caddo Parish, named after Caddo Parish, Louisiana, she was the only U.S. Naval vessel to bear the name.

== Construction ==
LST-515 was laid down on 3 September 1943, at Seneca, Illinois, by the Chicago Bridge & Iron Company; launched on 31 December 1943; sponsored by Miss Rebekah Brown; and commissioned on 28 January 1944.

== Service history ==
During World War II, LST-515 was assigned to the European Theater. She was one of the eight LST's that took part in the disastrous "Exercise Tiger", a practice for the planned invasion of France, in April 1944. Under attack from German E-boats, LST-515 returned fire and lowered her boats to pick up survivors from LST-507.

LST-515 participated in the Invasion of Normandy in June 1944. Following the war, LST-515 performed occupation duty in the Far East until mid-November 1952. She also saw postwar service with the Service Force, U.S. Atlantic Fleet.

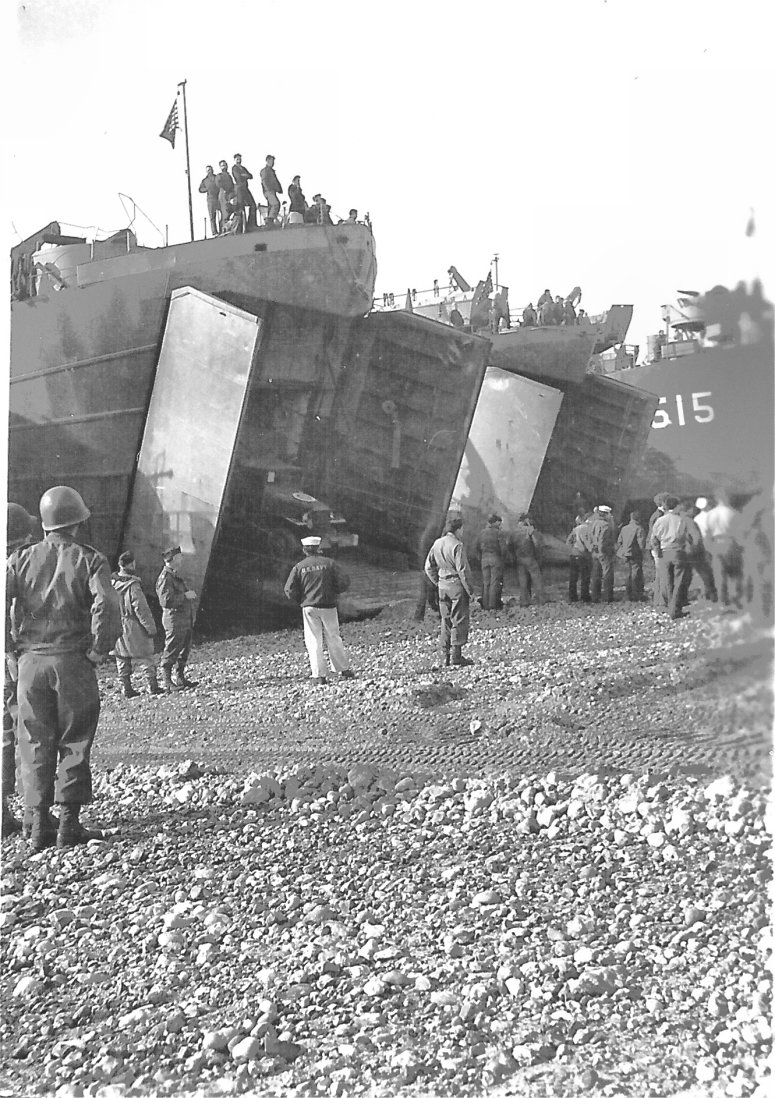
LST-515, an unidentified LST and LST-54 beached, date and place unknown. LST-54 is unloading a truck.

Upon her return to the United States, she was redesignated Caddo Parish, on 1 July 1955. The ship was decommissioned on 20 October 1955, and recommissioned on 2 August 1963.

In August 1964 Caddo Parish and USS Monmouth County [LST-1032] transported the US Navy School of Music from Washington DC to Norfolk, VA. Army musicians aboard noted that the last time Army personnel had been embarked was during the invasion of Normandy.

The tank landing ship performed service in Vietnam until transferred to the Republic of the Philippines as grant aid on 26 November 1969, she served the Philippine Navy as RPS Bataan (LT-85).

== Awards and honors ==
LST-515 received one battle stars for World War II service, and nine battle stars, one Navy Unit Commendation, and one Meritorious Unit Commendation for Vietnam War service.

== Bibliography ==
- "USS LST-515". NavSource. 17 January 2020.
- "'LST-515'". Dictionary of American Naval Fighting Ships. Navy Department, Naval History and Heritage Command. This article incorporates text from this source, which is in the public domain.
