= Frank's Ford Bridge =

Historic bridge in Oronoco, Minnesota

- U.S. National Register of Historic Places
- Frank's Ford Bridge in 2026, viewed from the west

- Location within Minnesota
- Nearest city: Oronoco, Minnesota
- Coordinates: 44°7′46.5″N 92°27′45″W
- Area: less than one acre
- Built: 1895
- Built by: Chicago Bridge & Iron Company
- Architect: Horton,Horace E.
- Architectural style: Pratt through truss
- NRHP reference No.: 80004534
- Added to NRHP: July 8, 1980

Frank's Ford Bridge, also called the Red Bridge and officially Bridge L6322, is a steel, pin-connected truss bridge that spans the south branch of the Zumbro River near Oronoco, Minnesota, United States. It was built in 1895 by Horace E. Horton of Chicago Bridge & Iron Company, making it one of Minnesota's oldest truss bridges. The bridge is 72 feet (22 m) long and 16 feet (4.9 m) wide. Due to deterioration, the bridge has been closed to vehicles since 1980 and closed to all use since 2011.

The builder, Horace E. Horton, was born in New York state in 1843 and moved to Rochester, Minnesota around 1859. He became the county surveyor in 1867 and built his first bridge in the vicinity of Oronoco. He founded the H.E. Horton Bridge Company and built many bridges in Minnesota and neighboring states. He moved to Chicago in 1889 to expand his market and founded the Chicago Bridge & Iron Company. Chicago Bridge & Iron Company still exists and is now known as CB&I.

In 2026, Olmsted County, which owns the bridge, proposed removing and reconstructing it to preserve it, though some area residents advocate rehabilitating it in its current location.
