= USS Atlas (ARL-7) =

World War II US Navy ship

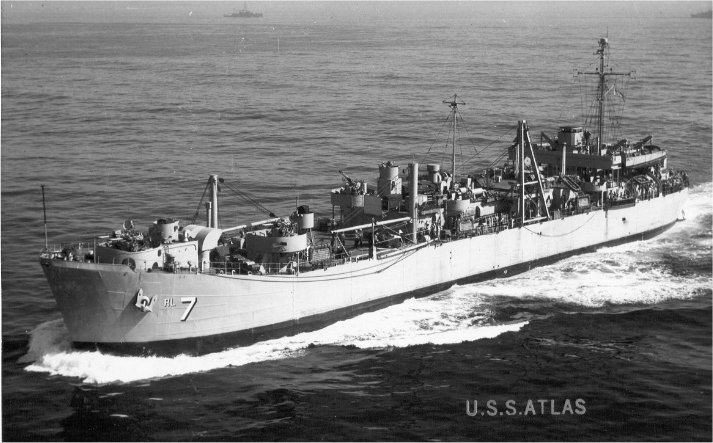
- Atlas departing the San Francisco Bay Area, after a yard availability, February 1953.

History

United States
- Name: USS Atlas
- Builder: Chicago Bridge & Iron Company, Seneca, Illinois
- Laid down: 3 June 1943, as LST-231
- Launched: 19 October 1943
- Commissioned: 15 November 1943
- Decommissioned: 13 September 1946
- Reclassified: ARL-7, 3 November 1943
- Recommissioned: 1 June 1951
- Decommissioned: 13 April 1956
- Stricken: 1 June 1972
- Fate: Sold for scrapping, 18 September 1973

General characteristics
- Class & type: Achelous class repair ship
- Displacement: 1,781 long tons (1,810 t) light, 3,960 long tons (4,024 t) full
- Length: 328 ft (100 m)
- Beam: 50 ft (15 m)
- Draft: 11 ft 2 in (3.40 m)
- Propulsion: 2 × General Motors 12-567 diesel engines, two shafts, twin rudders
- Speed: 12 knots (14 mph; 22 km/h)
- Complement: 255 officers and enlisted men
- Armament: 12 × Bofors 40 mm guns (2x4, 2x2), 12 × Oerlikon 20 mm cannons (6x2)

Service record
- Operations: World War II, Invasion of Normandy, Korean War
- Awards: 1 Battle star (WWII)

USS Atlas (ARL-7) was one of 39 Achelous-class landing craft repair ships built for the United States Navy during World War II. Named for Atlas (in Greek mythology, the son of the Titan Iapetus and Clymene the brother of Prometheus), she was the second U.S. Naval vessel to bear the name.

Originally laid down as LST-231 on 3 June 1943 at Seneca, Illinois by the Chicago Bridge & Iron Company; launched on 19 October 1943; sponsored by Mrs. Nettie Singer; named Atlas and redesignated a landing craft repair ship ARL-7 on 3 November 1943; and commissioned on 15 November 1943 for the voyage to the conversion yard. She arrived in Baltimore, Maryland on 14 December 1943; entered the Bethlehem Steel Key Highway Shipyard; and was placed out of commission for her conversion to a landing craft repair ship. Her modifications completed early in February, 1944 Atlas was recommissioned at Baltimore on 8 February 1944.

== Service history ==
=== World War II ===
After shakedown training along the Atlantic coast, Atlas departed Boston, Massachusetts at the end of the second week in March and steamed via Halifax, Nova Scotia to the British Isles. She arrived in Milford Haven, Wales on 29 March and remained there for two days before moving to Falmouth, England where she arrived on 1 April. She remained at Falmouth until the end of May when she proceeded to Plymouth to prepare for the invasion of Europe. Though not present for the actual assault, Atlas arrived on the scene on 8 June, two days after "D-Day," and immediately began repairing damaged landing craft. Her crew worked about 14 hours a day returning their charges to active service while frequently fighting to fend off enemy air attacks. She served at various locations on both sides of the English Channel almost until the end of hostilities in Europe. On 16 April 1945 the ship left Plymouth to return to the United States. She entered Norfolk on 5 May to begin seven weeks of repairs in preparation for duty in the Pacific.

Underway again on 22 June, the vessel transited the Panama Canal between 8–10 July and arrived in San Diego, California on the 25th. She remained there until 15 August, the day after Japan capitulated, before departing that port and heading for the Central Pacific. After stops at Pearl Harbor and Eniwetok, Atlas arrived at Guam in the Mariana Islands late in September and performed her repair duties there until late November. On the 27th, she shaped a course back toward Eniwetok and entered the lagoon at that atoll on 4 December 1945 for a five-month tour of repair work. At the end of April 1946, she stood out of the Eniwetok anchorage to begin the voyage back to the United States. She made a stop at Pearl Harbor en route before arriving in Astoria, Oregon on 24 May. There, she joined the Pacific Reserve Fleet though she was not officially decommissioned until 13 September 1946.

=== Korean War ===
Atlas remained inactive until midway through 1951 when the Fleet was expanding to meet the demand for warships caused by fighting in Korea. She was recommissioned at Astoria on 1 June 1951 and operated along the west coast until early November. On the 12th, the landing craft repair ship got underway for the Far East and made a stop at Pearl Harbor from 24 November to 1 December before continuing on to Japan. She arrived at Yokosuka on 21 December and, for the next nine months, repaired amphibious warfare ships and craft damaged in the Korean War. She operated primarily at Yokosuka and Sasebo but also saw service at Okinawa. On 25 September 1952, she left Yokosuka and shaped a course back to the United States. The ship stopped off at Pearl Harbor before continuing on to San Diego where she arrived on 24 October.

Atlas operated along the California coast until March 1954. She stood out of San Diego on the 16th of that month for another tour of duty in the Far East, reentered Yokosuka on 15 April, and resumed repair work on American amphibious warfare ships and craft operating in the Orient. On 15 August, the vessel departed Yokosuka on her way to Indochina where the Viet Minh had recently won independence from France. With the certainty that a communist regime was to be established in the north, the United States assisted those who wished to leave the north before the communist regime took complete control. Atlas arrived in Haiphong on 28 August to provide repair services while anchored in Henrietta Pass. She also provided station ship, mail exchange and communication relay services. She got underway again on 24 September shaping a course back toward Japan. She arrived in Yokosuka on 7 October but remained there only three days before beginning her homeward voyage. Following the customary port call at Pearl Harbor, she continued on to the California coast and reached San Diego on 7 November. Operations in and out of her home port filled her time until 16 March 1955. On that day, Atlas pointed her bow westward from San Diego for the final deployment of her career. After a stop at Pearl Harbor, the landing craft repair ship entered Yokosuka on 17 April. In addition to her repair work there, she put to sea for two special operations of unspecified nature in the Okinawa area. She also made liberty calls at Beppu and Kobe in Japan as well as at Hong Kong. On 21 September, Atlas weighed anchor at Yokosuka and shaped a course via Pearl Harbor for home and arrived at San Diego on 19 October.

On 7 November, the ship headed north, reached Astoria on 14 November, and began preparations for inactivation. She was decommissioned on 13 April 1956 and was berthed with the Astoria Group, Pacific Reserve Fleet. She remained in reserve until her name was struck from the Naval Vessel Register on 1 June 1972. She was sold to the Marine Power & Equipment Company of Seattle, Washington on 18 September 1973 for scrapping.

== Awards ==
Atlas earned one battle star during World War II.
