= USS LST-512 =

1943 LST-491-class tank landing ship

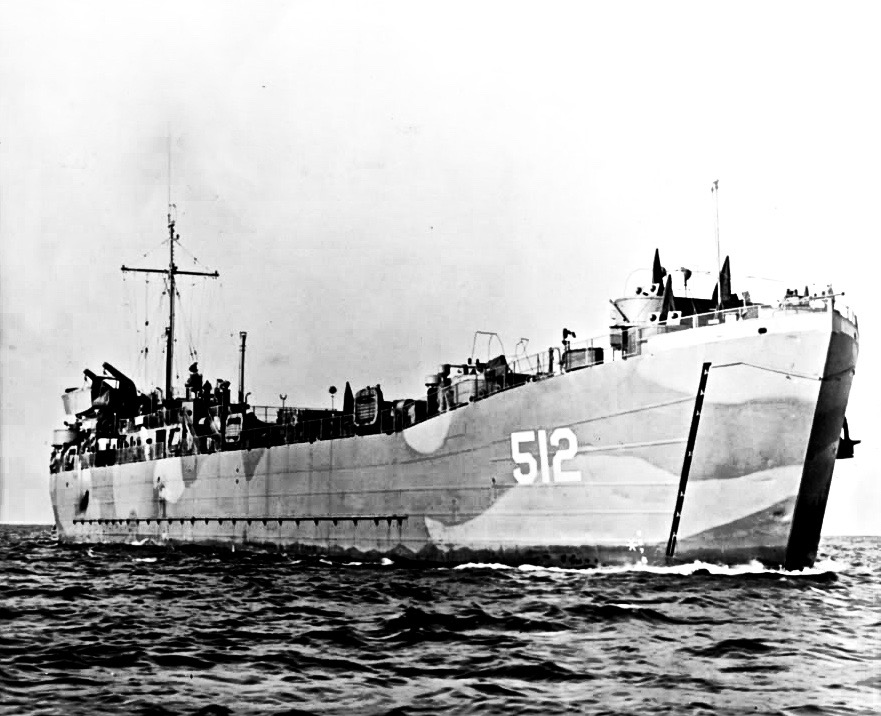
- USS LST-512 in 1945.

History

United States
- Name: LST-512 (1943–1955); Burnett County (1955–1957)
- Namesake: Burnett County, Wisconsin
- Builder: Chicago Bridge & Iron Company, Seneca, Illinois
- Laid down: 22 July 1943
- Launched: 10 December 1943
- Commissioned: 8 January 1944
- Decommissioned: 28 March 1947
- Renamed: Burnett County, 1 July 1955
- Stricken: 18 February 1957
- Identification: Hull symbol: LST-512; Code letters: NDYH
- Honors and awards: 1 × battle stars (WWII)
- Fate: Sold to Peru, 11 October 1957

Peru
- Name: Paita
- Acquired: 11 October 1957
- Decommissioned: 1983
- Identification: LT-35
- Fate: Deleted 1983

General characteristics
- Class & type: LST-491-class tank landing ship
- Displacement: 1,625 long tons (1,651 t) (light); 4,080 long tons (4,145 t) (full (seagoing draft with 1,675 short tons (1,520 t) load); 2,366 long tons (2,404 t) (beaching)
- Length: 328 ft (100 m) oa
- Beam: 50 ft (15 m)
- Draft: Unloaded: 2 ft 4 in (0.71 m) forward; 7 ft 6 in (2.29 m) aft; Full load: 8 ft 3 in (2.51 m) forward; 14 ft 1 in (4.29 m) aft; Landing with 500 short tons (450 t) load: 3 ft 11 in (1.19 m) forward; 9 ft 10 in (3.00 m) aft
- Installed power: 2 × 900 hp (670 kW) Electro-Motive Diesel 12-567A diesel engines; 1,700 shp (1,300 kW)
- Propulsion: 1 × Falk main reduction gears; 2 × Propellers
- Speed: 12 kn (22 km/h; 14 mph)
- Range: 24,000 nmi (44,000 km; 28,000 mi) at 9 kn (17 km/h; 10 mph) while displacing 3,960 long tons (4,024 t)
- Boats & landing craft carried: 6 x LCVPs
- Capacity: 1,600–1,900 short tons (3,200,000–3,800,000 lb; 1,500,000–1,700,000 kg) cargo depending on mission
- Troops: 16 officers, 147 enlisted men
- Complement: 13 officers, 104 enlisted men
- Armament: Varied, ultimate armament; 2 × twin 40 mm (1.57 in) Bofors guns; 4 × single 40 mm Bofors guns; 12 × 20 mm (0.79 in) Oerlikon cannons

USS Burnett County (LST-512) was an LST-491-class tank landing ship built for the United States Navy during World War II. Named for Burnett County, Wisconsin, she was the only U.S. Naval vessel to bear the name.

== Construction ==
LST-512 was laid down on 22 July 1943, at Seneca, Illinois by the Chicago Bridge & Iron Company; launched on 10 December 1943; and conducted her trial runs in the Ohio and Mississippi Rivers. Sponsored by Mrs. Gerry DeWane, she was sent to New Orleans, Louisiana, for her final fitting out and was commissioned on 8 January 1944.

== Service history ==
LST-512 was assigned to the European Theater and participated in the Invasion of Normandy, in June, 1944.

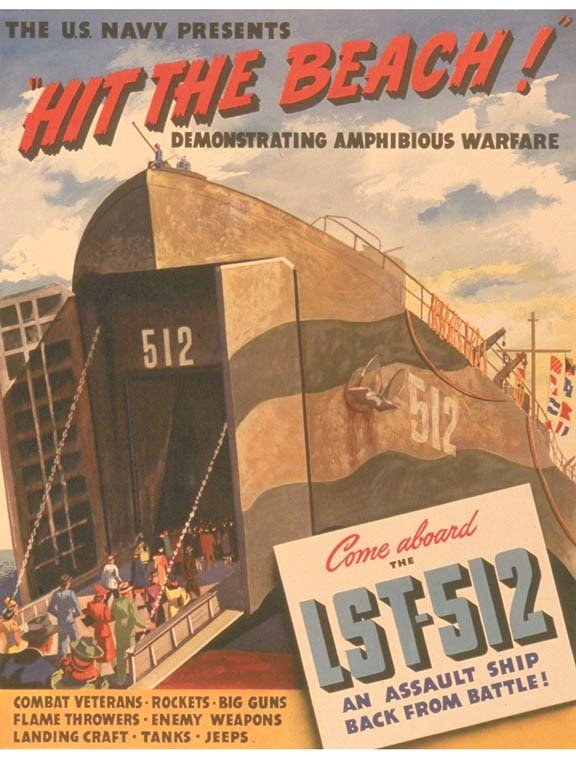
A poster from the World War II era featuring LST-512. The poster is now in the collections of the Library of Congress.

In October 1944, a severe storm in the English channel broached the ship on the beach, "breaking her back." She was towed to England, for temporary repairs, made by welding railroad iron alongside the damaged keel, then returned to the United States, where she was repaired and outfitted to do a war bond tour in the Great Lakes, Mississippi and Ohio Rivers. Leaving Norfolk, Virginia, in April 1945, the ship sailed to Miami, Florida, where soil and palm trees were loaded aboard to create a Pacific Island Jungle on a portion of the tank deck. She then moved to New Orleans, and was in that city on VE Day, 8 May 1945. She then began the journey up the Mississippi River to the Illinois River, and was the first LST to make the trip up both those rivers, and was the first and only LST to return to the inland shipyard where she was built. She arrived in Chicago, Illinois, on 21 May 1945, for additional preparation for the tour. The tour commenced in Detroit, Michigan, on 12 June. Displays on the tank deck included a Pacific Island jungle complete with enemy snipers concealed in trees, a map with miniature models of LSTs making amphibious landings in the Pacific, a captured Kamikaze "Baka" plane, and film footage of the war in the Pacific. Visitors could also look into the engine rooms, and tour crew quarters. On the main deck were displays of US armor, vehicles and artillery alongside captured Japanese artillery and vehicles. In addition to the static displays, the ship gave live demonstrations of amphibious landings, which included simulated bombardment and air strikes, followed by Marines landing in LCVPs and Amtracs. Once the landing zone was "secured", the ship would approach the beach and offload additional Amtracs, tanks and vehicles. Invasions were demonstrated in several cities, including Detroit, Rochester, Buffalo, Cleveland, Toledo, Duluth, Milwaukee, and Chicago. The ship was returning from Duluth, and was passing through the Soo Locks, at Sault Ste. Marie, Michigan, on V-J Day. The tour concluded on 13 January 1946, in New Orleans. During the tour, over two million visitors came aboard.

== Decommission ==
On 28 March 1947, LST-512 was decommissioned and assigned to the Pacific Reserve Fleet. On 1 July 1955, the ship was redesignated Burnett County (LST-512), and was struck from the Naval Vessel Register on 18 February 1957.

== Peru service ==
On 11 October 1957, she was sold to Peru. Renamed BAP Paita (LT-35), and commissioned in the Peruvian Navy. Employed as a training ship for the Peruvian Naval Academy. Later renumbered DT-141. Deleted 1983.

== Awards ==

LST-512 received one battle star for World War II Service.

== Bibliography ==
- "USS LST-512". NavSource. 20 October 2017.
- "'LST-512'". Dictionary of American Naval Fighting Ships. Navy Department, Naval History and Heritage Command. This article incorporates text from this source, which is in the public domain.
- Couhat, Jean Labayle (1978). Combat Fleets of the World 1978/79. Arms and Armour Press. ISBN 0-85368-282-8.
- Blackman, Raymond V. B., ed. (1963). Janes' Fighting Ships 1963-64. Publisher: Sampson Low, Marston & Co., Ltd.
- Gardiner, Robert (1995). Chumbley, Steven (ed.). Conway's All the World's Fighting Ships 1947–1995. Conways. ISBN 0-85177-605-1.
