= USS Resolute (AFDM-10) =

AFDM-3-class dry dock of the United States Navy

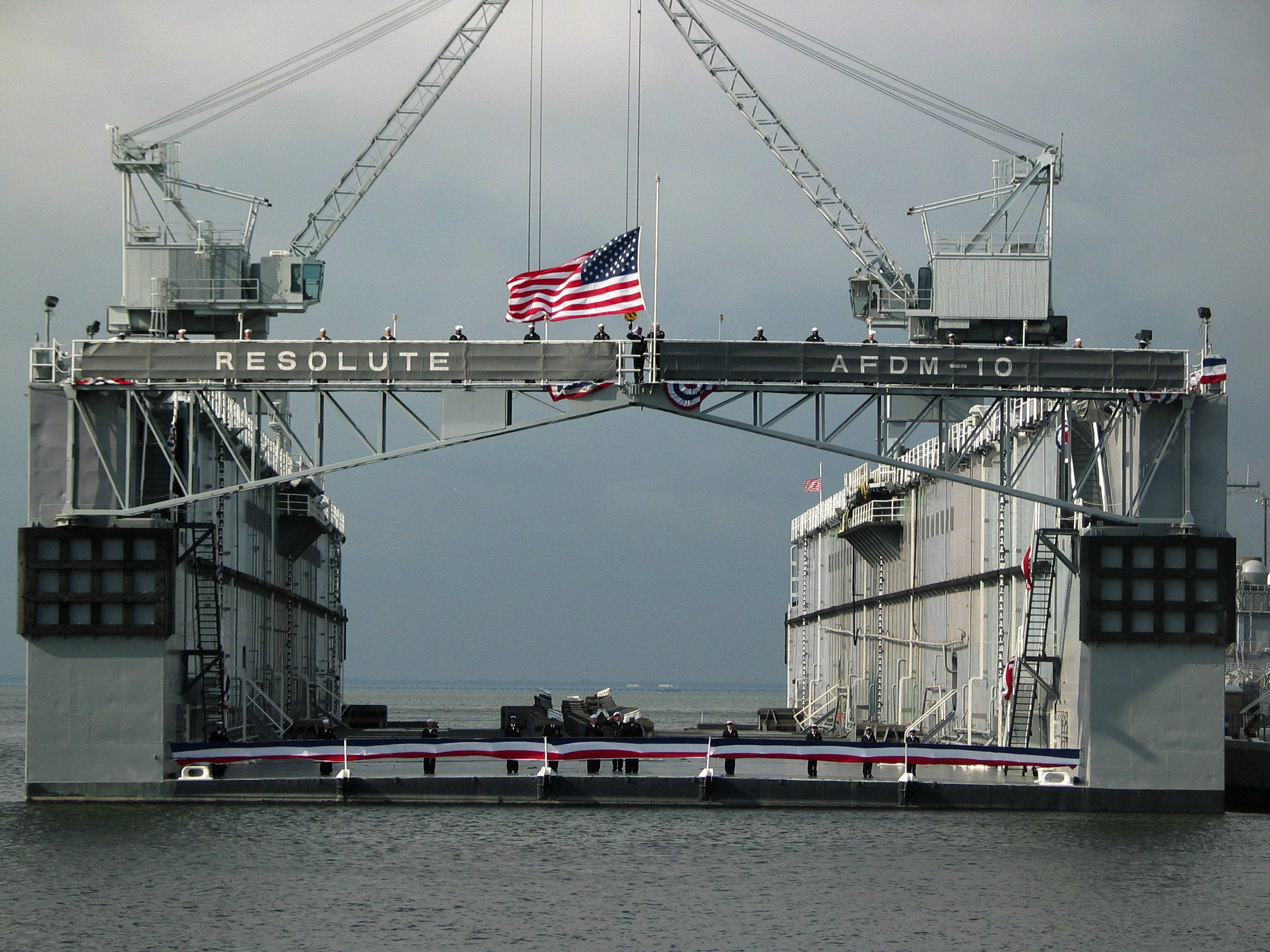
- USS Resolute

History

United States
- Name: Resolute
- Namesake: Resolute
- Builder: Chicago Bridge and Iron Co.
- Acquired: 1 January 1945
- Commissioned: 1945
- Decommissioned: 7 November 2003
- Reclassified: AFDM-10
- Identification: Callsign: NDGC; Hull number: YFD-67
- Motto: It Is More Than Ships At Sea
- Honors and awards: See Awards
- Fate: Leased to Todd Pacific Shipyards, 2004
- Status: Operational in Seattle, Washington

General characteristics
- Class & type: AFDM-3-class floating drydock
- Displacement: 7,000 t (6,889 long tons)
- Length: 552 ft 10 in (168.50 m)
- Beam: 124 ft 0 in (37.80 m)
- Draft: 7–15 ft (2.1–4.6 m)
- Installed power: 1,600 hp (1,193 kW)
- Speed: 22.9 knots (42.4 km/h; 26.4 mph)
- Capacity: 18,000 t (17,716 long tons)
- Complement: 4 officers, 146 enlisted

USS Resolute (AFDM-10), (formerly YFD-67), was a AFDM-3-class floating dry dock built in 1945 and operated by the United States Navy.

== Construction and career ==
YFD-67 was built by the Chicago Bridge and Iron Co., in Chicago, Illinois in 1945. She was delivered to the Navy on 1 January 1945 and commissioned later that year. The dry dock was later re-designated as AFDM-10 and given the name Resolute.

In November 1984, USS Finback (SSN-670) commenced her Selected Restricted Availability (SRA) docked in Resolute. On 25 January 1987, USS Hyman G. Rickover (SSN-709) began a SRA that included drydocking in Resolute at Norfolk.

Resolute dry docked Los Angeles-class submarines on 25 June 1995 and 12 April 1996. USS Oklahoma City (SSN-723) was dry docked on 12 August 1996. Later that year on 12 December, USS Minneapolis–Saint Paul (SSN-708) underwent repair work.

In December 2004, the dry dock was towed to the West Coast and leased to Todd Pacific Shipyards. On 5 February 2014, USS Momsen (DDG-92) was repaired on board the former Resolute. In early January 2019, USCGC Healy (WAGB-20) was overhauled and refitted inside the dry dock. From December 2019 until mid-2021, cruisers USS Chosin (CG-65) and USS Cape St. George (CG-71) were dry docked for Modernization Periods (MODPRD). Other ships worked on include USS Sampson (DDG-102), USS Coronado (LCS-4) and USS Manchester (LCS-14)

== Awards ==
- Navy Meritorious Unit Commendation (2 awards)
- Navy Battle "E" Ribbon (2 awards)
- National Defense Service Medal (2 awards)
