= USS LST-517 =

American tank landing ship

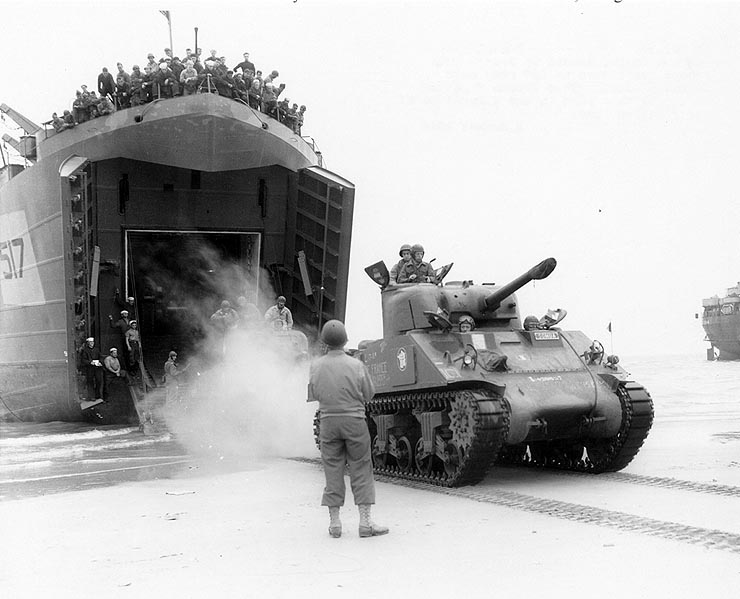
- LST-517 offloading a Sherman tank of the French 2nd Armored Division, August 1944

History

United States
- Name: USS LST-517
- Laid down: 10 September 1943
- Launched: 15 January 1944
- Commissioned: 7 February 1944
- Decommissioned: 21 December 1945
- Stricken: 21 January 1946
- Fate: Sold for scrap 1947

General characteristics
- Class & type: Landing Ship, Tank Mk. 2
- Length: 327 ft 9 in (99.90 m)
- Beam: 50 ft (15 m)
- Draft: Unloaded : 3 ft 4 in (1.02 m) bow; 7 ft 6 in (2.29 m) stern; Loaded : 8 ft 2 in (2.49 m) bow; 14 ft 1 in (4.29 m) stern
- Propulsion: 2 × General Motors 12-567 diesel engines, two shafts, twin rudders
- Speed: 12 knots (14 mph; 22 km/h)
- Boats & landing craft carried: 2 to 6 LCVPs
- Troops: Approx. 140 officers and other ranks
- Complement: 8 to 10 officers, 100 to 115 enlisted
- Armament: 1 × 3 in (76 mm)/50 gun; 6 × 40 mm guns; 6 × 20 mm guns; 2 × .50 cal (12.7 mm) machine guns; 4 × .30 cal (7.62 mm) machine guns

The USS LST-517 was a tank landing ship in the service of the United States Navy during World War II.

LST-517 was laid down on 10 September 1943 at Seneca, Illinois by the Chicago Bridge & Iron Company; launched on 15 January 1944; sponsored by Miss Onita Watland Walker; and commissioned on 7 February 1944. During World War II, LST-517 was assigned to the European theater and participated in the invasion of Normandy on 6 June 1944. Upon her return to the United States, she was decommissioned on 21 December 1945 and struck from the Navy list on 21 January 1946. A year later the tank landing ship was transferred to the Maritime Administration for disposal and sold for scrap to the National Metal and Steel Corporation on 17 January 1947.

LST-517 received one battle star for World War II service.

== See also ==
- List of United States Navy LSTs
