= USS Pentheus =

1944 Achelous-class repair ship

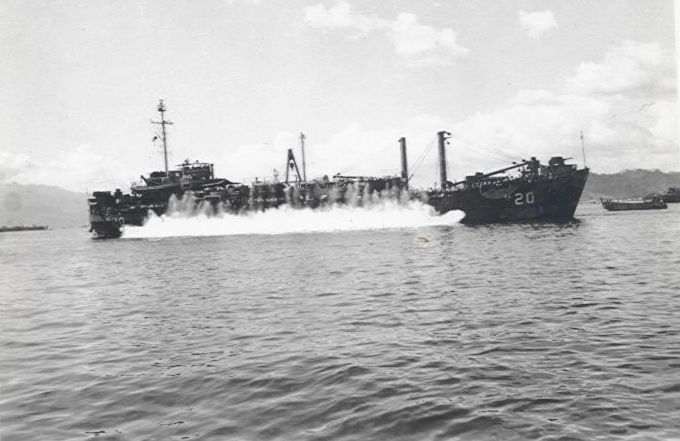
- Pentheus off-loading pontoons that she had taken on at Providence, Rhode Island on completion of her voyage to Subic Bay in October 1945

History

United States
- Name: USS Pentheus
- Builder: Chicago Bridge and Iron Company
- Laid down: 29 September 1944
- Launched: 22 December 1944
- Commissioned: 7 June 1945
- Decommissioned: 20 April 1946
- Stricken: 1 January 1960
- Fate: Sold, 13 June 1960

General characteristics
- Class & type: Achelous class repair ship
- Displacement: 2,220 long tons (2,256 t) light; 4,100 long tons (4,166 t) full
- Length: 328 ft (100 m)
- Beam: 50 ft (15 m)
- Draft: 11 ft 2 in (3.40 m)
- Propulsion: 2 × General Motors 12-567 diesel engines, two shafts, twin rudders
- Speed: 12 knots (14 mph; 22 km/h)
- Complement: 255 officers and enlisted men
- Armament: 2 × quad 40 mm guns (with Mark 51 director); 2 × twin 40 mm guns (with Mark 51 director); 6 × twin 20 mm guns

USS Pentheus (ARL-20) was one of 39 Achelous-class landing craft repair ships built for the United States Navy during World War II. Named for Pentheus (a king of Thebes, according to Greek legend), she was the only U.S. Naval vessel to bear the name.

Originally laid down as LST–1115 by the Chicago Bridge and Iron Company of Seneca, Illinois on 29 September 1944; launched 22 December 1944; and placed in reduced commission 4 January 1945. Proceeding to Baltimore, Maryland, she decommissioned 6 February 1945; underwent conversion; and was commissioned in full as USS Pentheus (ARL–20) 7 June 1945.

== Service history ==
Following shakedown in Chesapeake Bay, Pentheus took on pontoons at Providence, Rhode Island, and on 15 July got underway for the Canal Zone. Crossing into the Pacific 26 July, she steamed on to Subic Bay, Philippines. Arriving 17 October, she engaged in repair work there until sailing for Pearl Harbor 5 January 1946. From Pearl Harbor, she steamed to Johnston Island for two weeks duty prior to getting underway for Green Cove Springs, Florida and inactivation.

Arriving 20 April she decommissioned and joined the Atlantic Reserve Fleet, where she remained until struck from the Naval Vessel Register 1 January 1960. She was sold on 13 June 1960 to Ships, Inc. of Florida. Her final fate is unknown.
