= West Water Tower and Ground Storage Tank =

- U.S. National Register of Historic Places
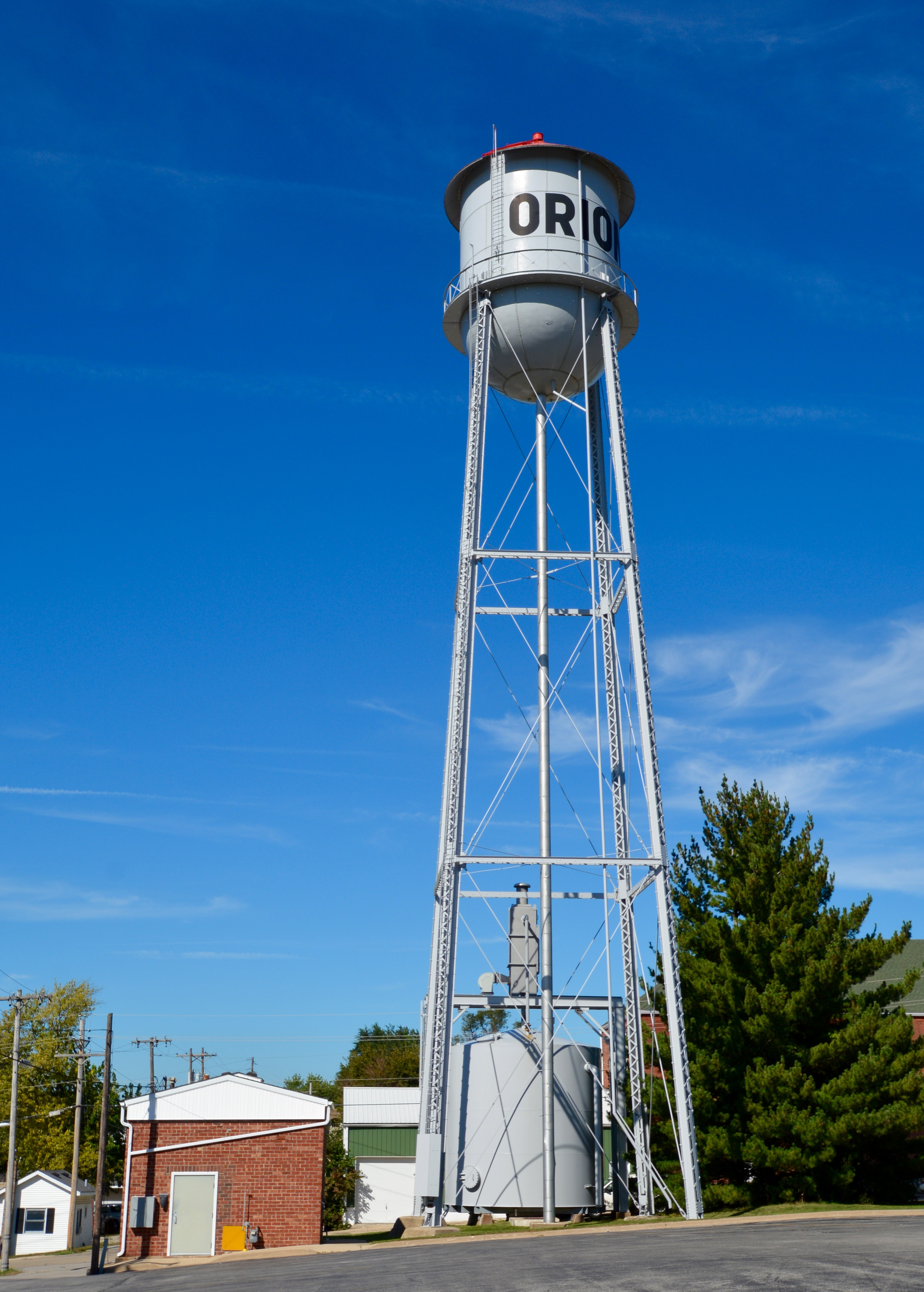

- Location within Illinois Location within the United States
- Location: 310 11th Ave. Orion, Illinois
- Coordinates: 41°21′12″N 90°22′55″W
- Area: less than one acre
- Built: 1928
- Built by: Vosburgh, James C.; Chicago Bridge & Iron
- Architectural style: Water Tank
- NRHP reference No.: 02001754
- Added to NRHP: February 5, 2003

The West Water Tower and Ground Storage Tank are a historic water tower and storage tank located at 310 11th Avenue in Orion, Illinois. The tower and tank were built in 1928 as part of the village's new water system, which had been approved the previous year. The water system was introduced both as a response to several fires which had plagued the village and as an effort to bring modern technology and progress, among other civic concerns. The water tower consists of a steel tank with a hemispherical bottom supported by a steel trestle; the structure is 136.5 feet (41.6 m) tall. The ground storage tank, located at the base of the tower, is made of redwood and holds 30,000 US gallons (110,000 L; 25,000 imp gal) of water.

The structures were added to the National Register of Historic Places on February 5, 2003.
