= Mineral Springs Waterworks =

- U.S. National Register of Historic Places
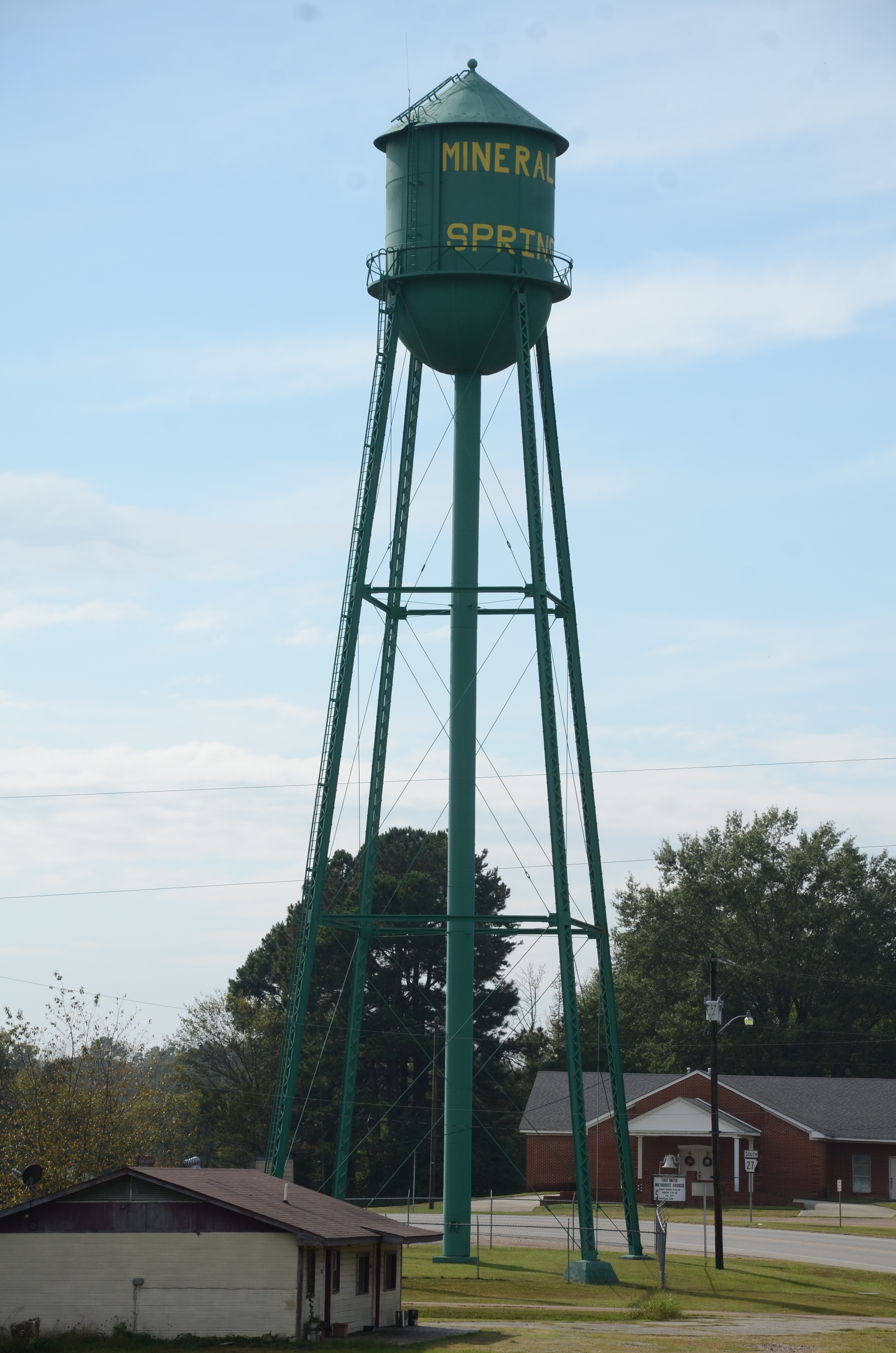

- Location within Arkansas Location within the United States
- Location: S. of W. Runnels and S. Hall intersection, Mineral Springs, Arkansas
- Coordinates: 33°52′30″N 93°55′17″W
- Area: less than one acre
- Built by: Pittsburgh Des Moines Steel Company
- MPS: New Deal Recovery Efforts in Arkansas MPS
- NRHP reference No.: 07000473
- Added to NRHP: May 29, 2007

The Mineral Springs Waterworks is a historic site located in Mineral Springs, Arkansas. It contains a good example of a 1930s-era elevated steel water tower, built in 1936 by the Pittsburgh-Des Moines Steel Company in conjunction with the Public Works Administration as part of a project to improve the town's water supply. The tower was built to store water obtained from a nearby well. It was added to the National Register of Historic Places in 2007, as part of a multiple-property listing that included numerous other New Deal-era projects throughout Arkansas. A new water well was drilled nearby in 1985; however, the original water tower still stands. The Mineral Springs Waterworks remains in operation.

== See also ==
- Cotter Water Tower
- Cotton Plant Water Tower
- Hampton Waterworks
- Hartford Water Tower
- National Register of Historic Places listings in Howard County, Arkansas
