= Waldo water tower (Waldo, Arkansas) =

- U.S. National Register of Historic Places
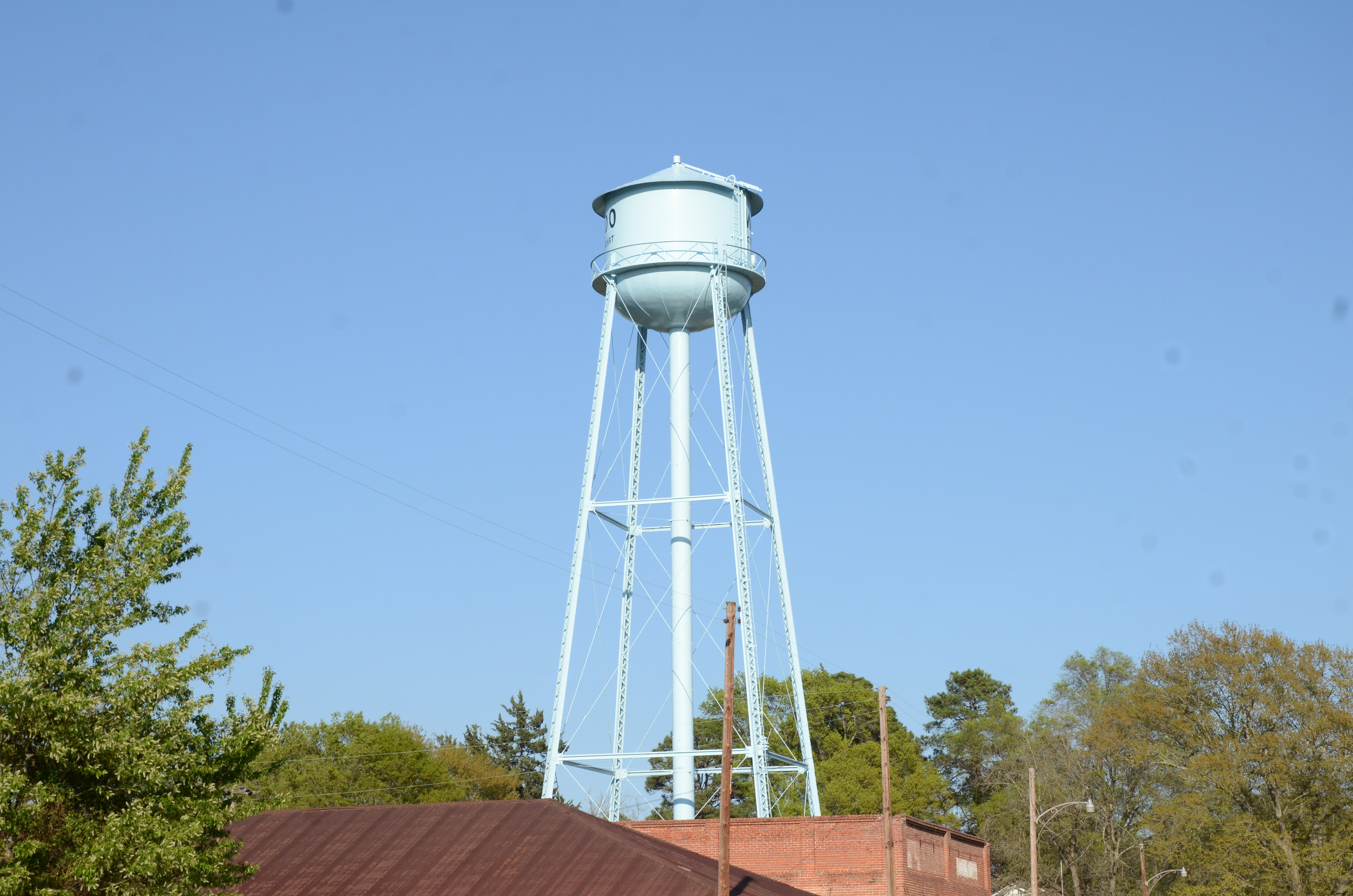
- Waldo water tower, March 2016

- Location within Arkansas Location within the United States
- Location: E. Main St. west of the N. Skimmer and E. Main intersection, Waldo, Arkansas
- Coordinates: 33°21′11″N 93°16′56″W
- Area: less than one acre
- Built: 1936
- Built by: Pittsburgh Des Moines Steel Company
- MPS: New Deal Recovery Efforts in Arkansas MPS
- NRHP reference No.: 07000472
- Added to NRHP: May 29, 2007

The Waldo water tower is a historic elevated steel water tower located in Waldo, Arkansas, United States, that is listed on the National Register of Historic Places.

== Description ==
The tower was completed in 1936 by the Pittsburgh-Des Moines Steel Company in conjunction with the Public Works Administration as part of a project to improve the town's water supply. It was added to the National Register of Historic Places in 2007, as part of a multiple-property listing that included numerous other New Deal-era projects throughout Arkansas. The tower is still in operation as part of the town's water supply system.

== See also ==
- National Register of Historic Places listings in Columbia County, Arkansas
- Cotter Water Tower
- Cotton Plant Water Tower
- Hampton Waterworks
