= Cotter water tower =

- U.S. National Register of Historic Places
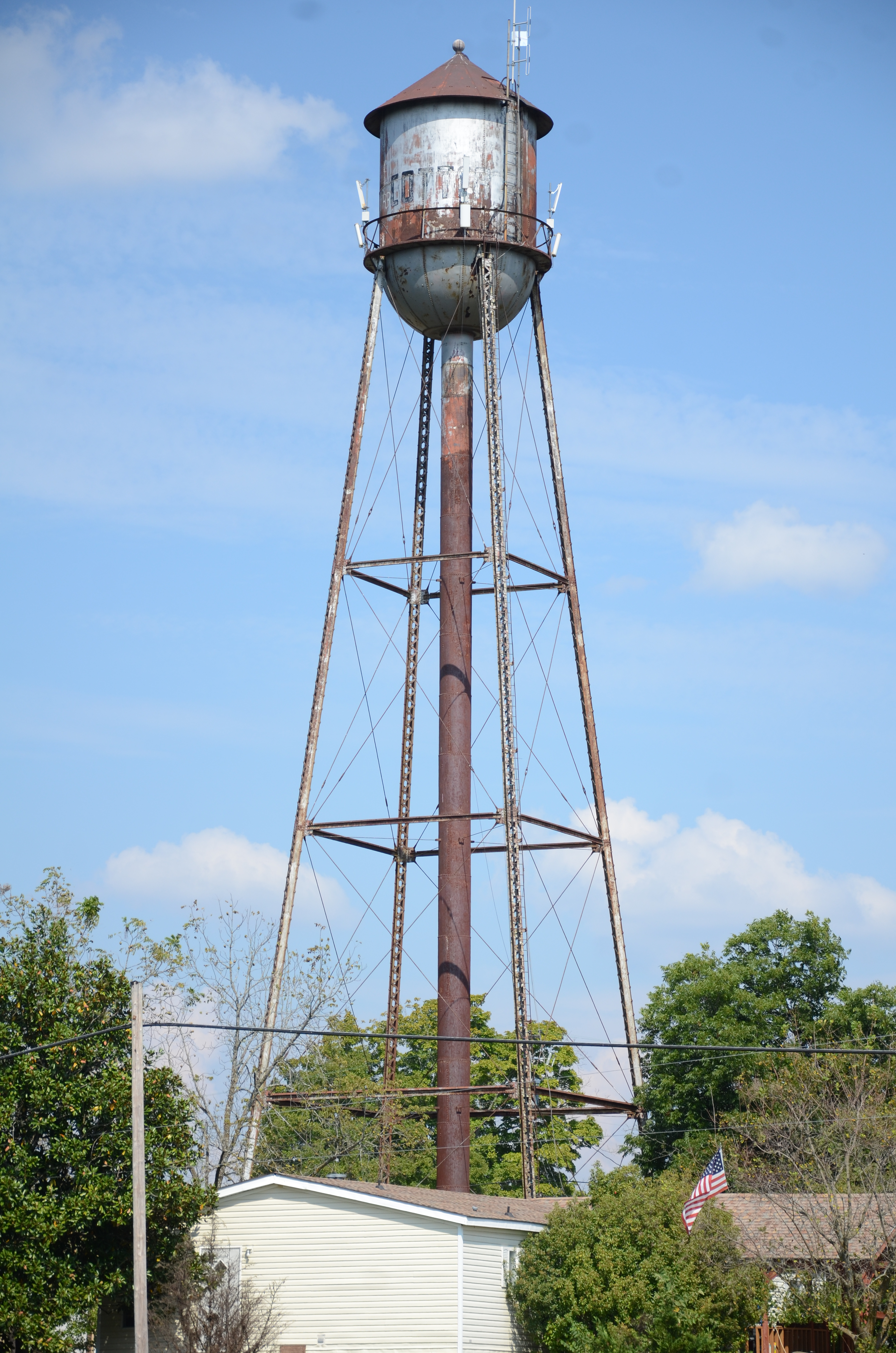

- Location within Arkansas Location within the United States
- Location: NE of jct. of NE US 62B and State St., Cotter, Arkansas
- Coordinates: 36°16′34″N 92°31′46″W
- Area: less than one acre
- Built: 1935
- Built by: Pittsburgh-Des Moines Steel Company
- MPS: New Deal Recovery Efforts in Arkansas MPS
- NRHP reference No.: 06001280
- Added to NRHP: January 24, 2007

The Cotter water tower is a historic elevated steel water tower located in Cotter, Arkansas. It was constructed in 1935 by the Pittsburgh-Des Moines Steel Company, as part of the development of the local water supply system by the Public Works Administration. The tower was added to the National Register of Historic Places in 2007, as part of a multiple-property listing that included numerous other PWA-era projects in Arkansas, under the heading “An Ambition to Be Preferred: New Deal Recovery Efforts and Architecture in Arkansas, 1933-1943.”

== See also ==
- Cotton Plant water tower
- Hampton Waterworks
- Mineral Springs Waterworks
- National Register of Historic Places listings in Baxter County, Arkansas
- Waldo Water Tower (Waldo, Arkansas)
