= Hampton Waterworks =

- U.S. National Register of Historic Places
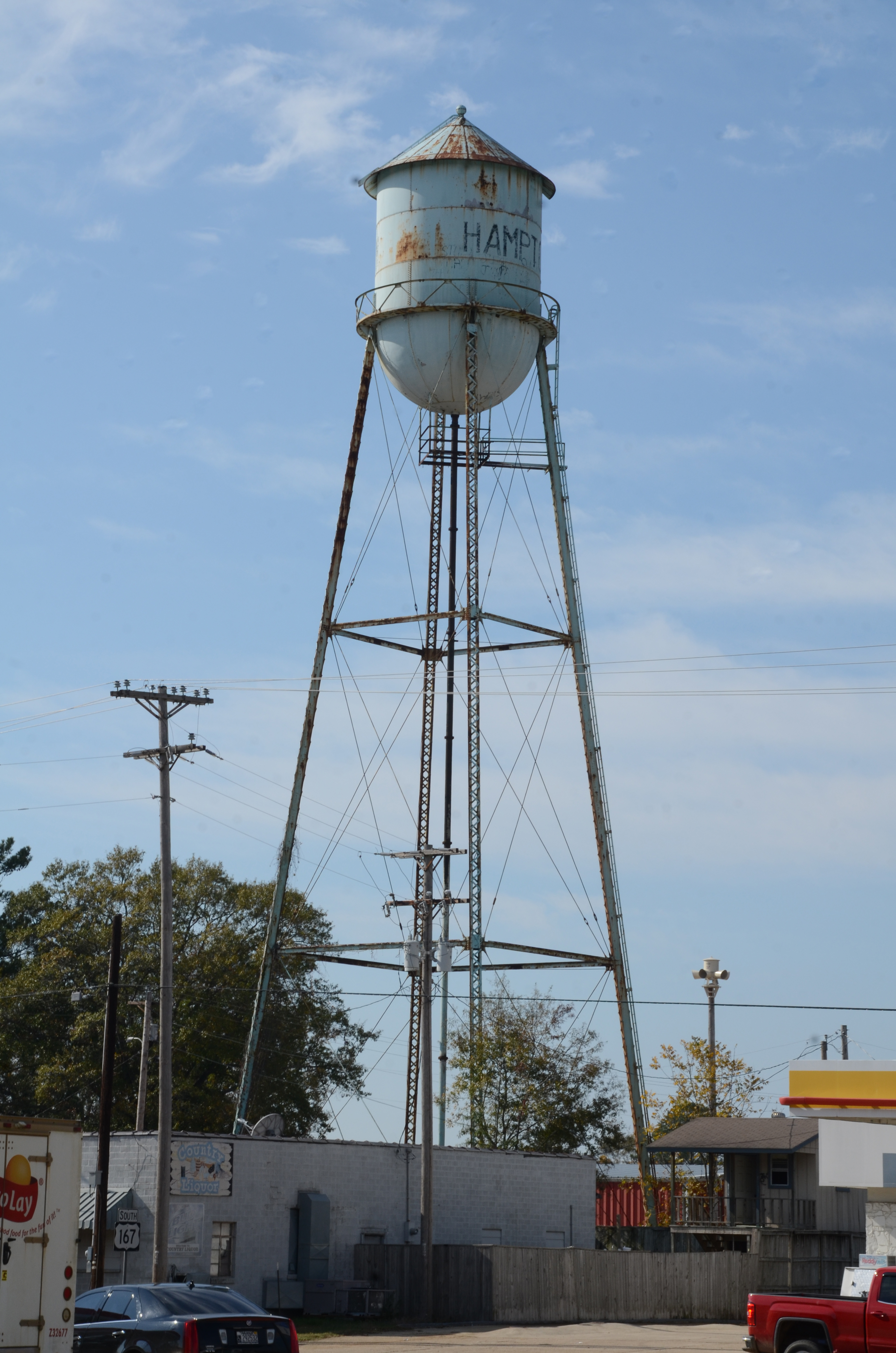

- Location within Arkansas Location within the United States
- Location: Hunt St., W of Lee St., Hampton, Arkansas
- Coordinates: 33°32′21″N 92°28′14″W
- Area: less than one acre
- Built: 1937
- Built by: Pittsburgh-Des Moines Steel Company
- MPS: New Deal Recovery Efforts in Arkansas MPS
- NRHP reference No.: 06000909
- Added to NRHP: October 5, 2006

The Hampton Waterworks is a historic site located in Hampton, Arkansas. Completed in 1937, it is the only surviving example of a Public Works Administration-built waterworks in Calhoun County. The site contains a good example of a 1930s-era elevated steel water tower, built by the Pittsburgh-Des Moines Steel Company. The site was added to the National Register of Historic Places in 2006.

== See also ==
- Cotter water tower
- Cotton Plant water tower
- Mineral Springs Waterworks
- National Register of Historic Places listings in Calhoun County, Arkansas
