= Water tower =

Elevated structure supporting a tank

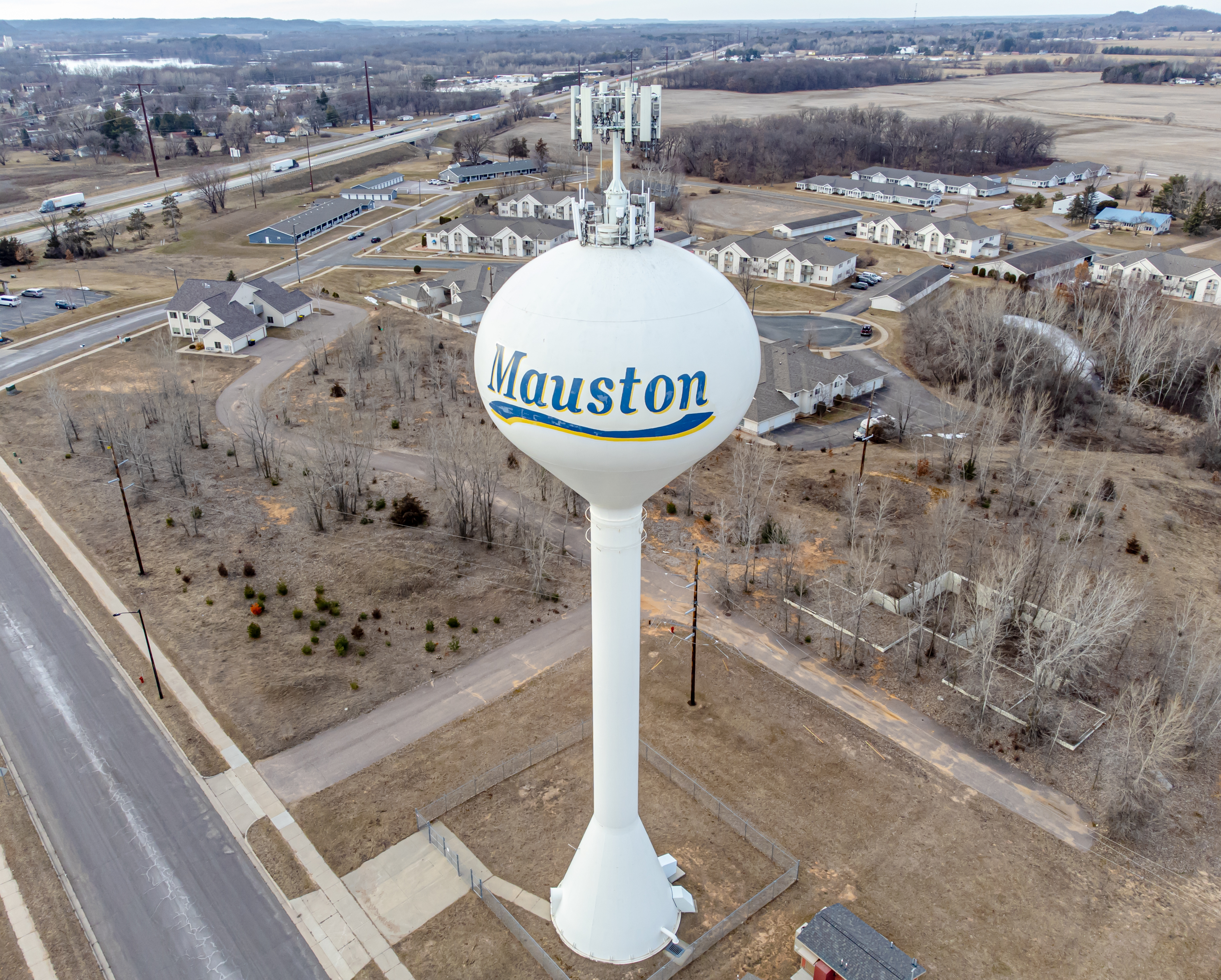
Water tower with cellular tower on top in Mauston, Wisconsin, United States

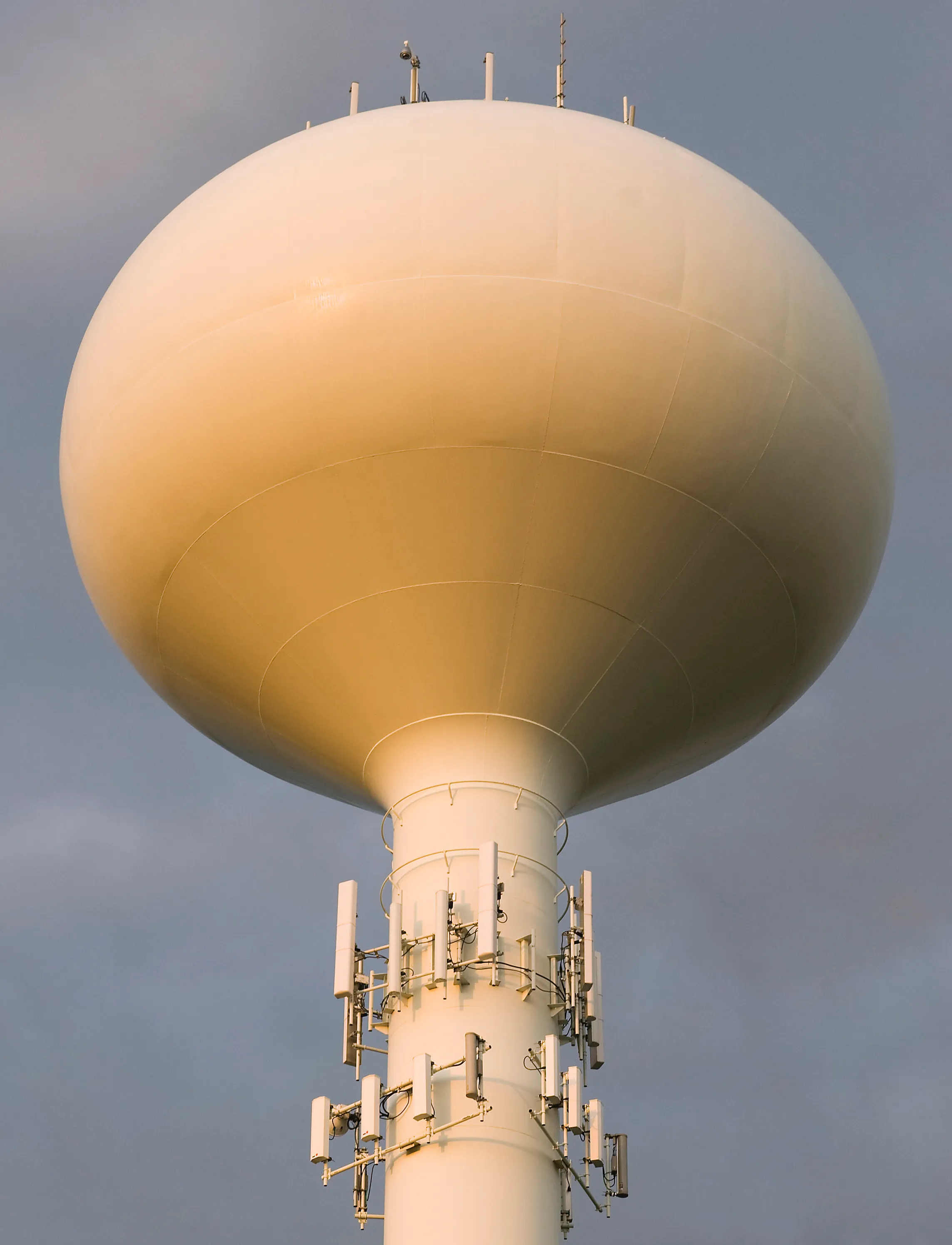
Water tower with cellular equipment around its neck in Barrington, Illinois, U.S.

A water tower is an elevated structure supporting a water tank constructed at a height sufficient to pressurize a distribution system for potable water, and to provide emergency storage for fire protection. Water towers often operate in conjunction with underground or surface service reservoirs, which store treated water close to where it will be used. Other types of water towers may only store raw (non-potable) water for fire protection or industrial purposes, and may not necessarily be connected to a public water supply.

Water towers are able to supply water even during power outages, because they rely on hydrostatic pressure produced by elevation of water (due to gravity) to push the water into domestic and industrial water distribution systems; however, they cannot supply the water for a long time without power, because a pump is typically required to refill the tower. A water tower also serves as a reservoir to help with water needs during peak usage times. The water level in the tower typically falls during the peak usage hours of the day, and then a pump fills it back up during the night. This process also keeps the water from freezing in cold weather, since the tower is constantly being drained and refilled.

== History ==
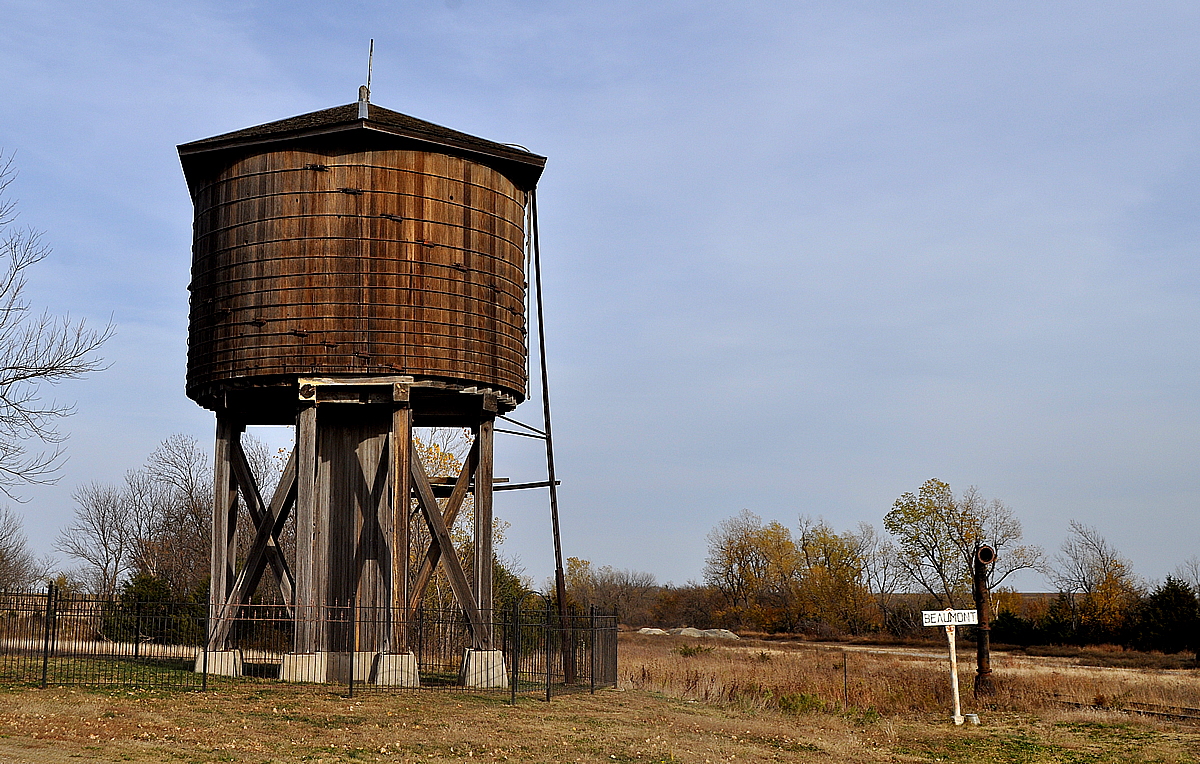
Beaumont St. Louis and San Francisco Railroad Water Tank (1875, restored 2012), Beaumont, Kansas, U.S.

Although the use of elevated water storage tanks has existed since ancient times in various forms, the modern use of water towers for pressurized public water systems developed during the mid-19th century, as steam-pumping became more common, and better pipes that could handle higher pressures were developed. In the United Kingdom, standpipes consisted of tall, exposed, N-shaped pipes, used for pressure relief and to provide a fixed elevation for steam-driven pumping engines which tended to produce a pulsing flow, while the pressurized water distribution system required constant pressure. Standpipes also provided a convenient fixed location to measure flow rates. Designers typically enclosed the riser pipes in decorative masonry or wooden structures. By the late 19th century, standpipes grew to include storage tanks to meet the ever-increasing demands of growing cities.

Many early water towers are now considered historically significant and have been included in various heritage listings around the world. Some are converted to apartments or exclusive penthouses. In certain areas, such as New York City in the United States, smaller water towers are constructed for individual buildings. In California and some other states, domestic water towers enclosed by siding (tankhouses) were once built (1850s–1930s) to supply individual homes; windmills pumped water from hand-dug wells up into the tank in New York.

Water towers were used to supply water stops for steam locomotives on railroad lines. Early steam locomotives required water stops every 7 to 10 miles (11 to 16 km).

== Design and construction ==
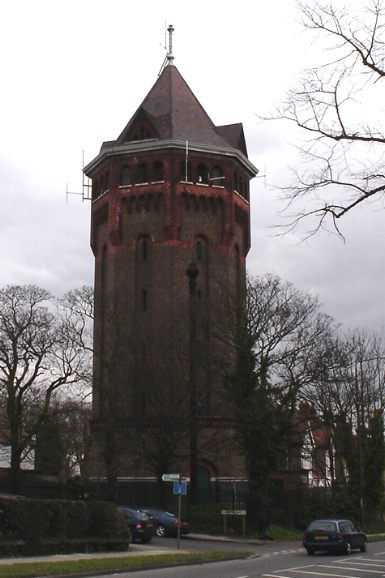
Shooter's Hill water tower is a local landmark in London, United Kingdom. Water towers are common around London suburbs.

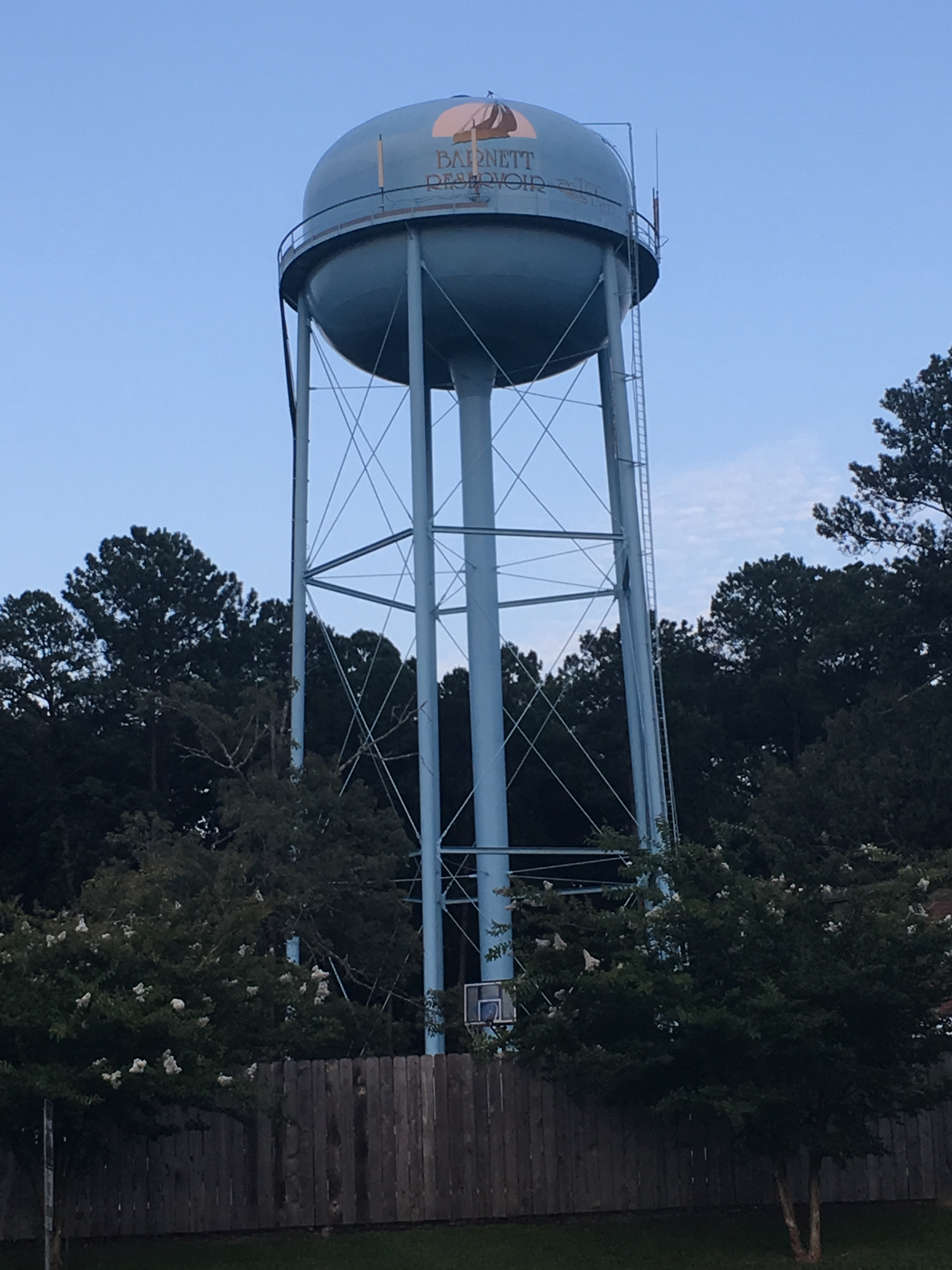
Ross Barnett Reservoir water tower in Mississippi, U.S., an example of an older design of water tower

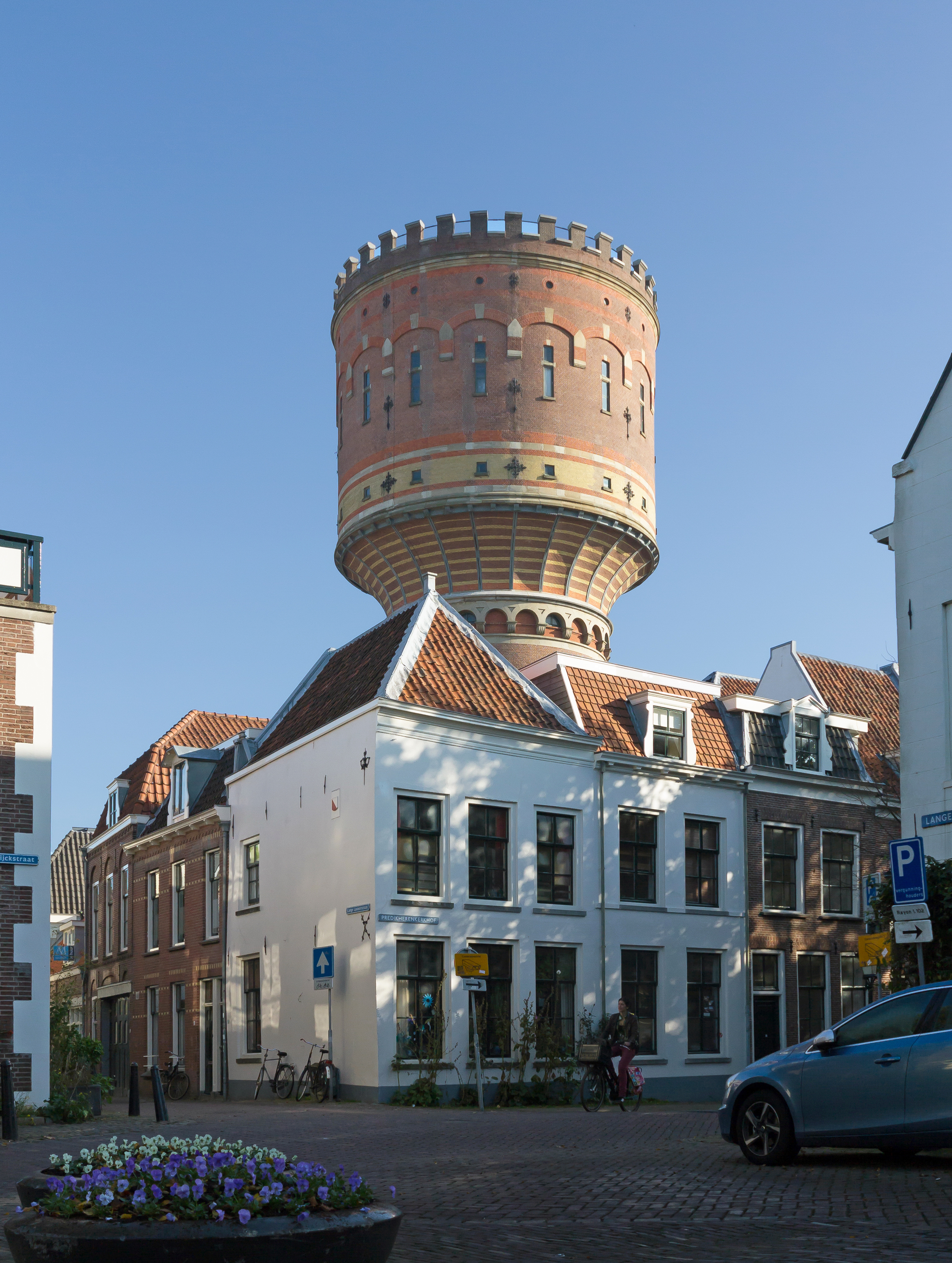
A water tower in Utrecht, Netherlands

A variety of materials can be used to construct a typical water tower; steel and reinforced or prestressed concrete are most often used (with wood, fiberglass, or brick also in use), incorporating an interior coating to protect the water from any effects from the lining material. The reservoir in the tower may be spherical, cylindrical, or an ellipsoid, with a minimum height of approximately 6 metres (20 ft) and a minimum of 4 m (13 ft) in diameter. A standard water tower typically has a height of approximately 40 m (130 ft).

Pressurization occurs through the hydrostatic pressure of the elevation of water; for every 102 mm (4.016 in) of elevation, it produces 1 kPa (0.145 psi) of pressure. Thirty meters (98.43 ft) of elevation produces roughly 300 kPa (43.511 psi), which is enough pressure to operate and provide for most domestic water pressure and distribution system requirements.

The height of the tower provides the pressure for the water supply system, and it may be supplemented with a pump. The volume of the reservoir and diameter of the piping provide and sustain flow rate. However, relying on a pump to provide pressure is expensive; to keep up with varying demand, the pump would have to be sized to meet peak demands. During periods of low demand, jockey pumps are used to meet these lower water flow requirements. The water tower reduces the need for electrical consumption of cycling pumps and thus the need for an expensive pump control system, as this system would have to be sized sufficiently to give the same pressure at high flow rates.

Very high volumes and flow rates are needed when fighting fires. With a water tower present, pumps can be sized for average demand, not peak demand; the water tower can provide water pressure during the day and pumps will refill the water tower when demands are lower.

Using wireless sensor networks to monitor water levels inside the tower allows municipalities to automatically monitor and control pumps without installing and maintaining expensive data cables.

== Architecture ==
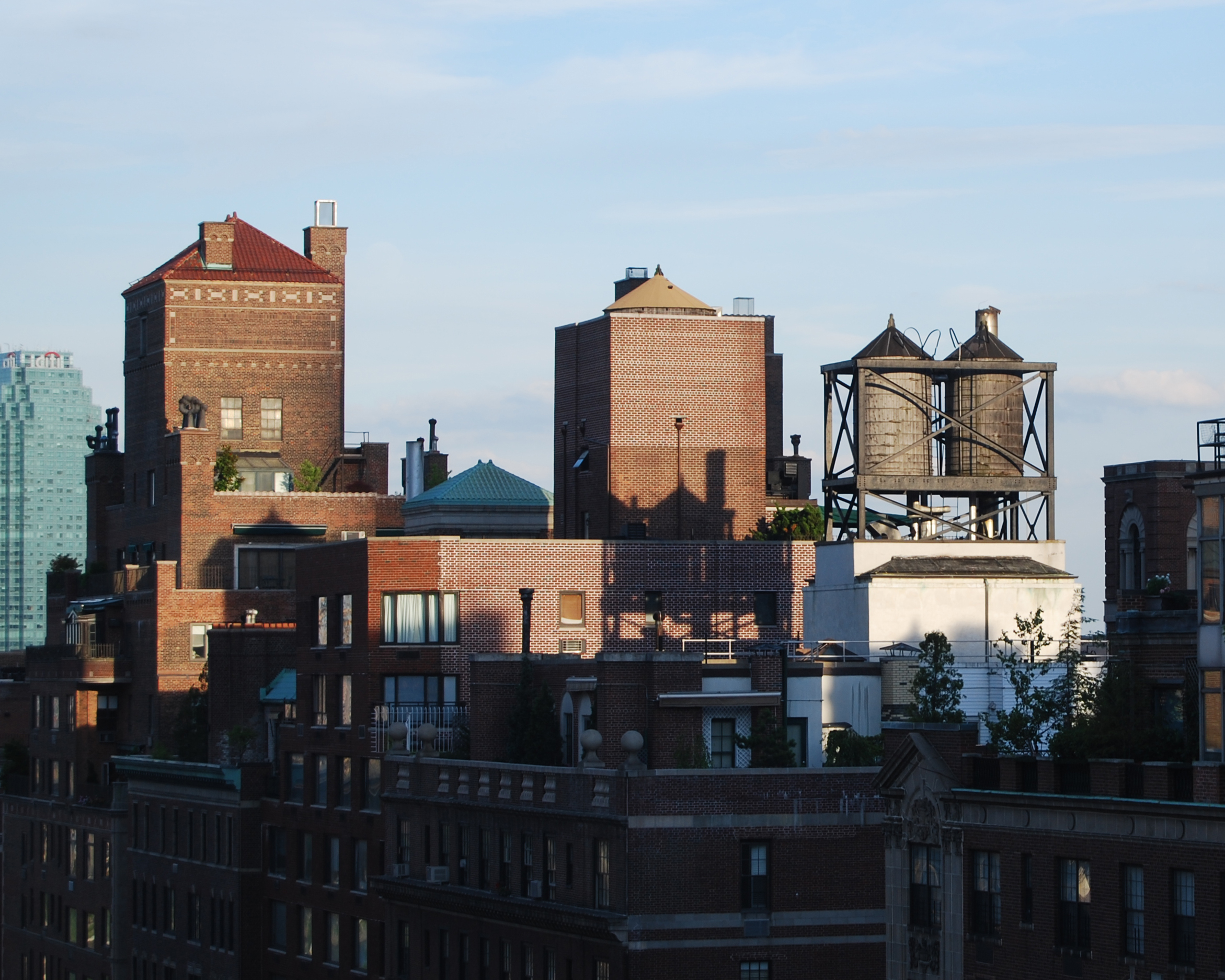
Rooftop water towers on apartment buildings on East 57th Street in New York City

The adjacent image shows three architectural approaches to incorporating these tanks in the design of a building, one on East 57th Street in New York City. From left to right, a fully enclosed and ornately decorated brick structure, a simple unadorned roofless brick structure hiding most of the tank but revealing the top of the tank, and a simple utilitarian structure that makes no effort to hide the tanks or otherwise incorporate them into the design of the building.

The technology dates to at least the 19th century, and for a long time New York City required that all buildings higher than six stories be equipped with a rooftop water tower. Two companies in New York build water towers, both of which are family businesses in operation since the 19th century.

The original water tower builders were barrel makers who expanded their craft to meet a modern need as buildings in the city grew taller in height. Even today, no sealant is used to hold the water in. The wooden walls of the water tower are held together with steel cables or straps, but water leaks through the gaps when first filled. As the water saturates the wood, it swells, the gaps close and become impermeable. The rooftop water towers store 250,000 to 500,000 litres (55,000 to 110,000 imp gal; 66,000 to 132,000 US gal) of water until it is needed in the building below. The upper portion of water is skimmed off the top for everyday use while the water in the bottom of the tower is held in reserve to fight fire. When the water drops below a certain level, a pressure switch, level switch or float valve will activate a pump or open a public water line to refill the water tower.

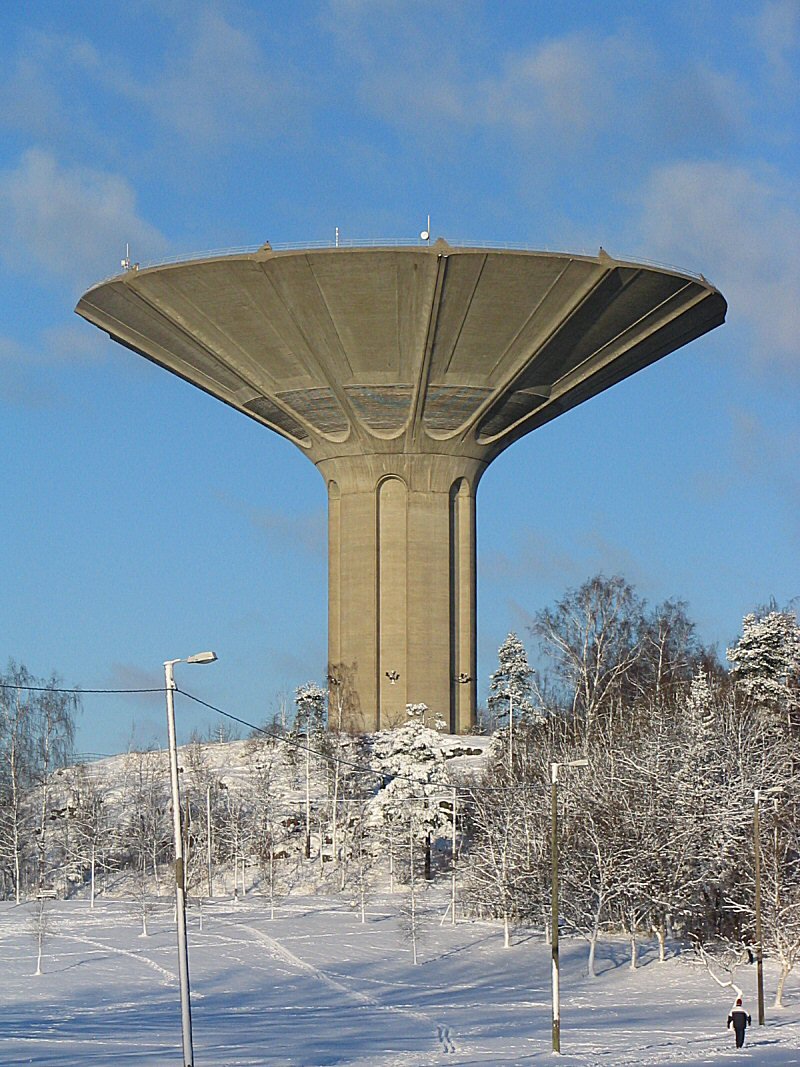
The mushroom-shaped concrete water tower of Roihuvuori in Helsinki, Finland was built in the 1970s. It is 52 metres (171 ft) high and can hold around 12,000 cubic metres (420,000 cu ft) of water.

Architects and builders have taken varied approaches to incorporating water towers into the design of their buildings. On many large commercial buildings, water towers are completely hidden behind an extension of the facade of the building. For cosmetic reasons, apartment buildings often enclose their tanks in rooftop structures, either simple unadorned rooftop boxes, or ornately decorated structures intended to enhance the visual appeal of the building. Many buildings, however, leave their water towers in plain view atop utilitarian framework structures.

If the pumps fail (such as during a power outage), then water pressure will be lost, causing potential public health concerns. Many U.S. states require a "boil-water advisory" to be issued if water pressure drops below 20 pounds per square inch (140 kPa). This advisory presumes that the lower pressure might allow pathogens to enter the system.

Some have been converted to serve modern purposes, as for example, the Wieża Ciśnień (Wrocław water tower) in Wrocław, Poland which is today a restaurant complex. Others have been converted to residential use.

Historically, railroads that used steam locomotives required a means of replenishing the locomotive's tenders. Water towers were common along the railroad. The tenders were usually replenished by water cranes, which were fed by a water tower.

Some water towers are also used as observation towers, and some restaurants, such as the Goldbergturm in Sindelfingen, Germany, or the second of the three Kuwait Towers, in the State of Kuwait. It is also common to use water towers as the location of transmission mechanisms in the UHF range with small power, for instance for closed rural broadcasting service, amateur radio, or cellular telephone service.

In hilly regions, local topography can be substituted for structures to elevate the tanks. These tanks are often nothing more than concrete cisterns terraced into the sides of local hills or mountains, but function identically to the traditional water tower. The tops of these tanks can be landscaped or used as park space, if desired.

=== Spheres and spheroids ===
The Chicago Bridge and Iron Company has built many of the water spheres and spheroids found in the United States. The website World's Tallest Water Sphere describes the distinction between a water sphere and water spheroid thus:

A water sphere is a type of water tower that has a large sphere at the top of its post. The sphere looks like a golf ball sitting on a tee or a round lollipop. A cross section of a sphere in any direction (east-west, north-south, or top-bottom) is a perfect circle. A water spheroid looks like a water sphere, but the top is wider than it is tall. A spheroid looks like a round pillow that is somewhat flattened. A cross section of a spheroid in two directions (east-west or north-south) is an ellipse, but in only one direction (top-bottom) is it a perfect circle. Both spheres and spheroids are special-case ellipsoids: spheres have symmetry in 3 directions, spheroids have symmetry in 2 directions. Scalene ellipsoids have 3 unequal length axes and three unequal cross sections.

The Union Watersphere is a water tower topped with a sphere-shaped water tank in Union, New Jersey, and characterized as the World's Tallest Water Sphere.

A Star Ledger article suggested a water tower in Erwin, North Carolina completed in early 2012, 219.75 ft (66.98 m) tall and holding 500,000 US gallons (1,900 m^{3}), had become the World's Tallest Water Sphere. However, photographs of the Erwin water tower revealed the new tower to be a water spheroid.

The water tower in Braman, Oklahoma, built by the Kaw Nation and completed in 2010, is 220.6 ft (67.2 m) tall and can hold 350,000 US gallons (1,300 m^{3}). Slightly taller than the Union Watersphere, it is also a spheroid.

Another tower in Oklahoma, built in 1986 and billed as the "largest water tower in the country", is 218 ft (66 m) tall, can hold 500,000 US gallons (1,900 m^{3}), and is located in Edmond.

The Earthoid, a perfectly spherical tank located in Germantown, Maryland, U.S., is 100 ft (30 m) tall and holds 2,000,000 US gallons (7,600 m^{3}) of water. The name is taken from it being painted to resemble a globe of the world.

The golf ball-shaped tank of the water tower at Gonzales, California is supported by three tubular legs and reaches about 125 ft (38 m) high.

The Watertoren (or Water Towers) in Eindhoven, Netherlands contain three spherical tanks, each 10 m (33 ft) in diameter and capable of holding 500 cubic metres (130,000 US gal) of water, on three 43.45 m (142.6 ft) spires were completed in 1970.

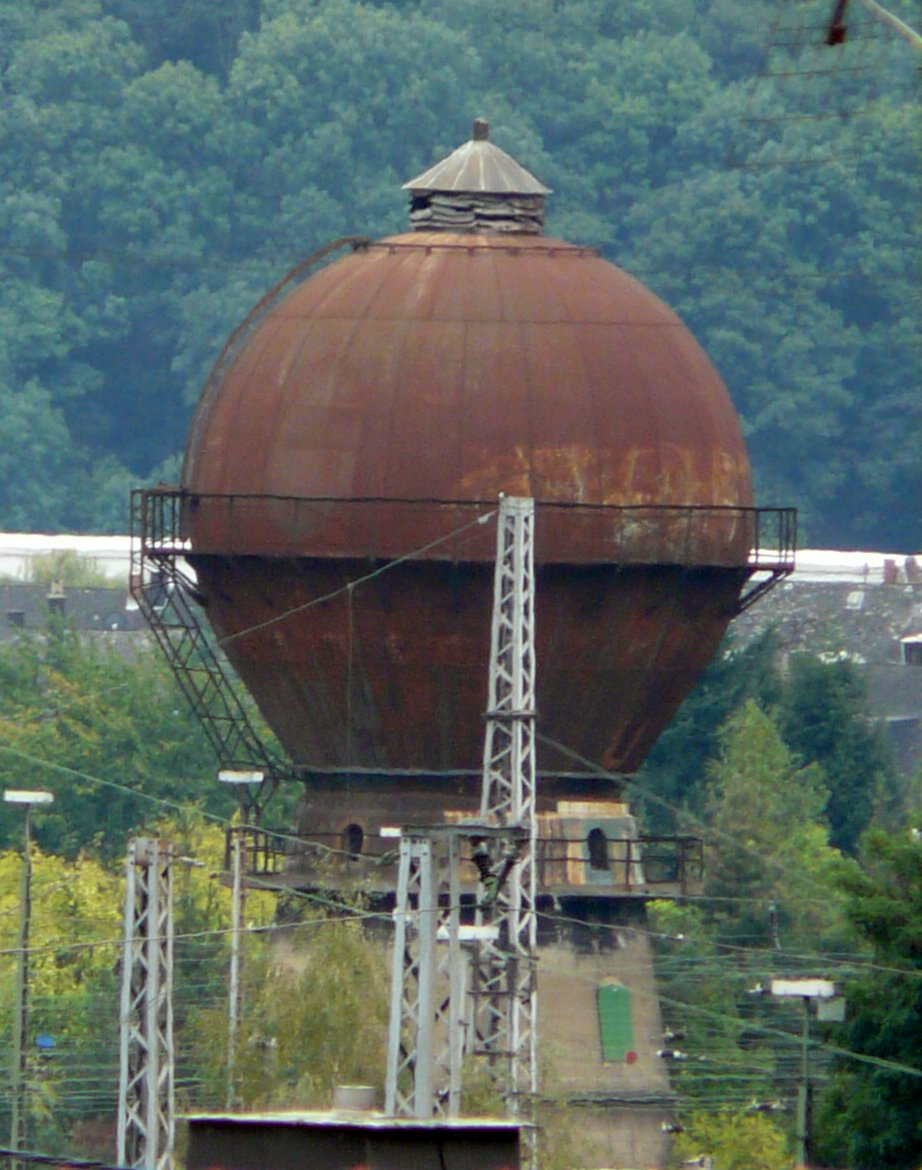
Disused sphere-shaped railway water tower in Trier, Germany

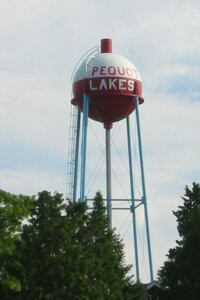
Paul Bunyan's Bobber Water Tower in Pequot Lakes, Minnesota, U.S.

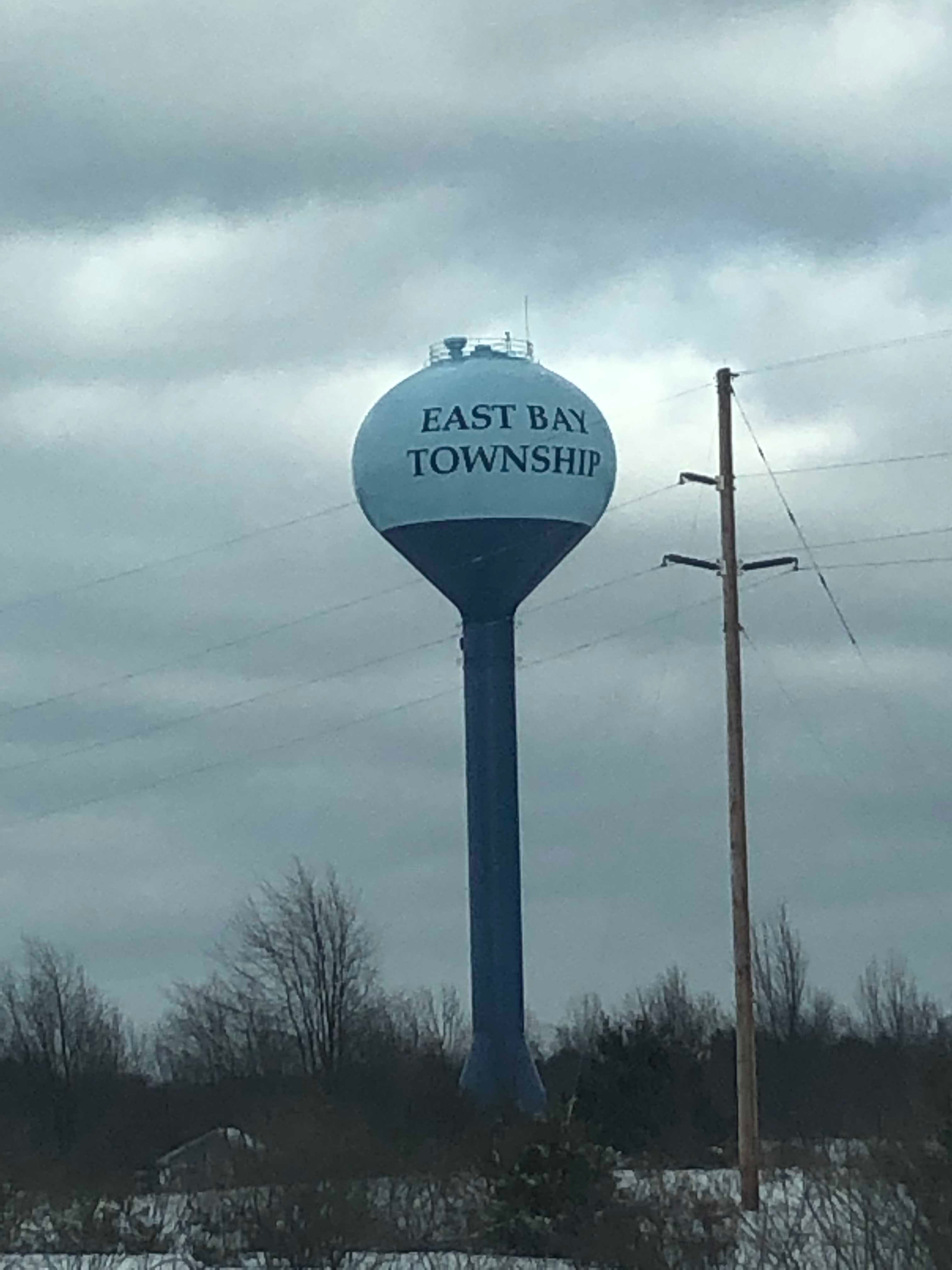
East Bay Township Water Tower near Traverse City, Michigan, U.S.

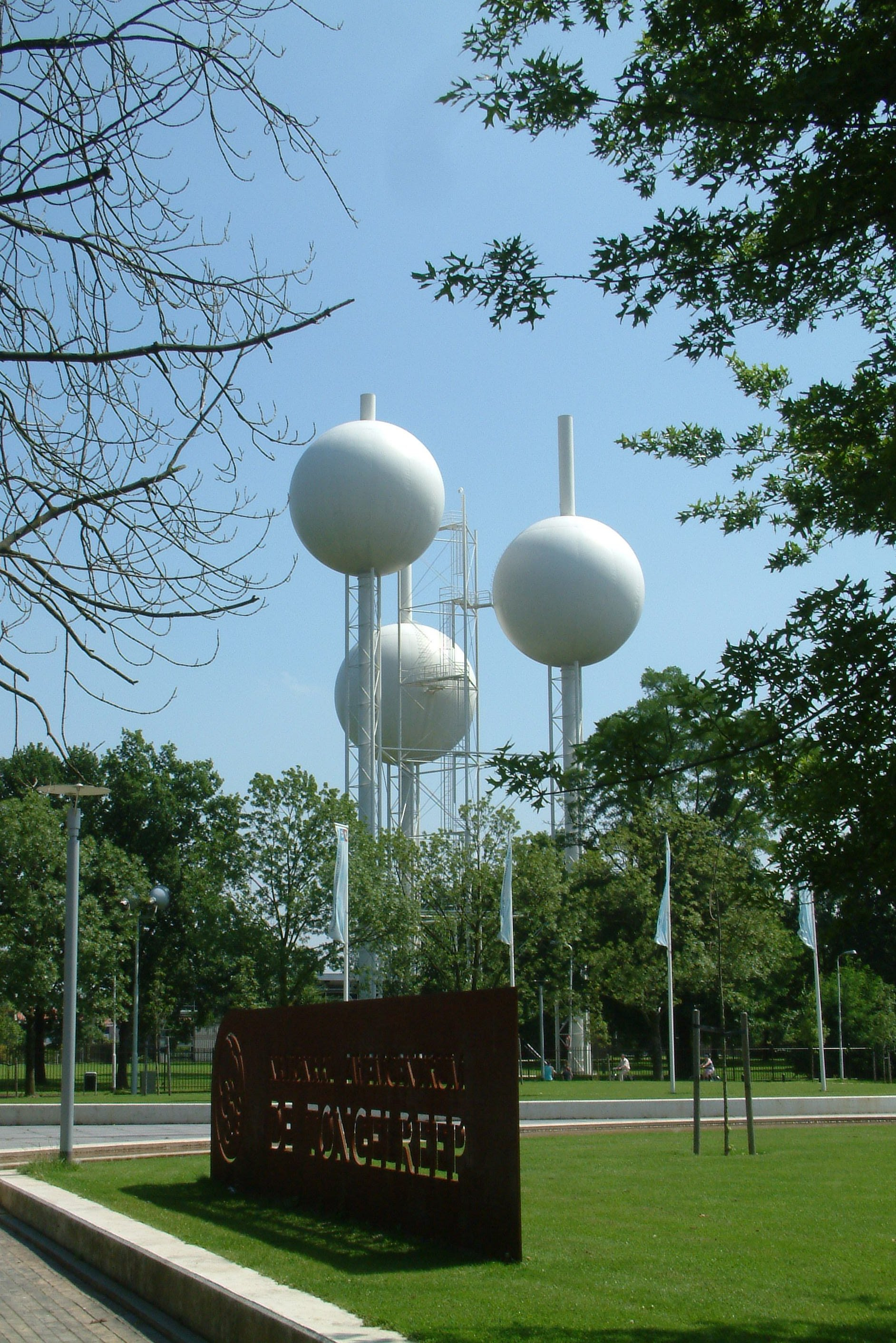
Eindhoven Water Towers, Netherlands

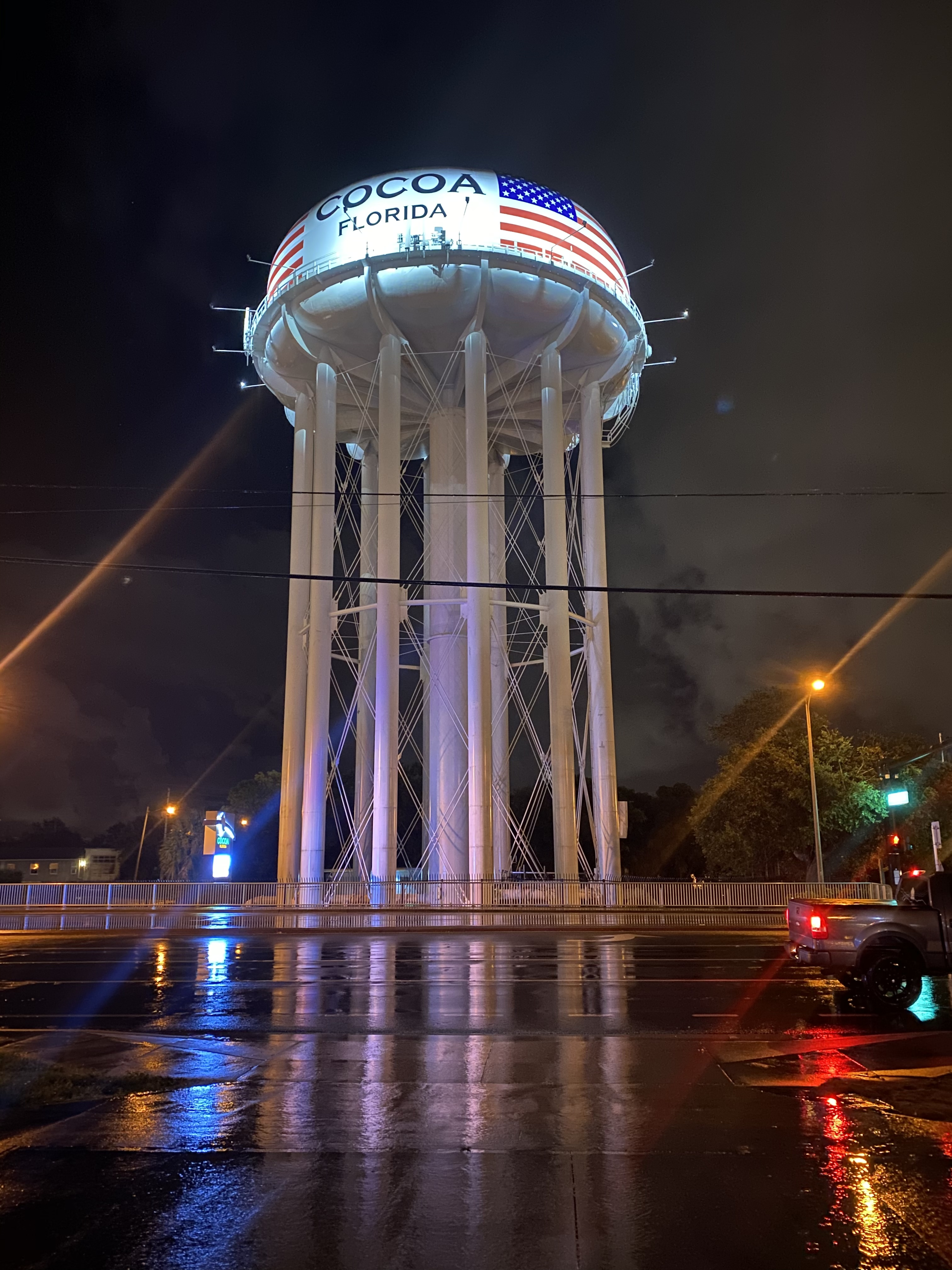
Oblate spheroid water tower in Cocoa, Florida, U.S.

== Decoration and Traditions ==
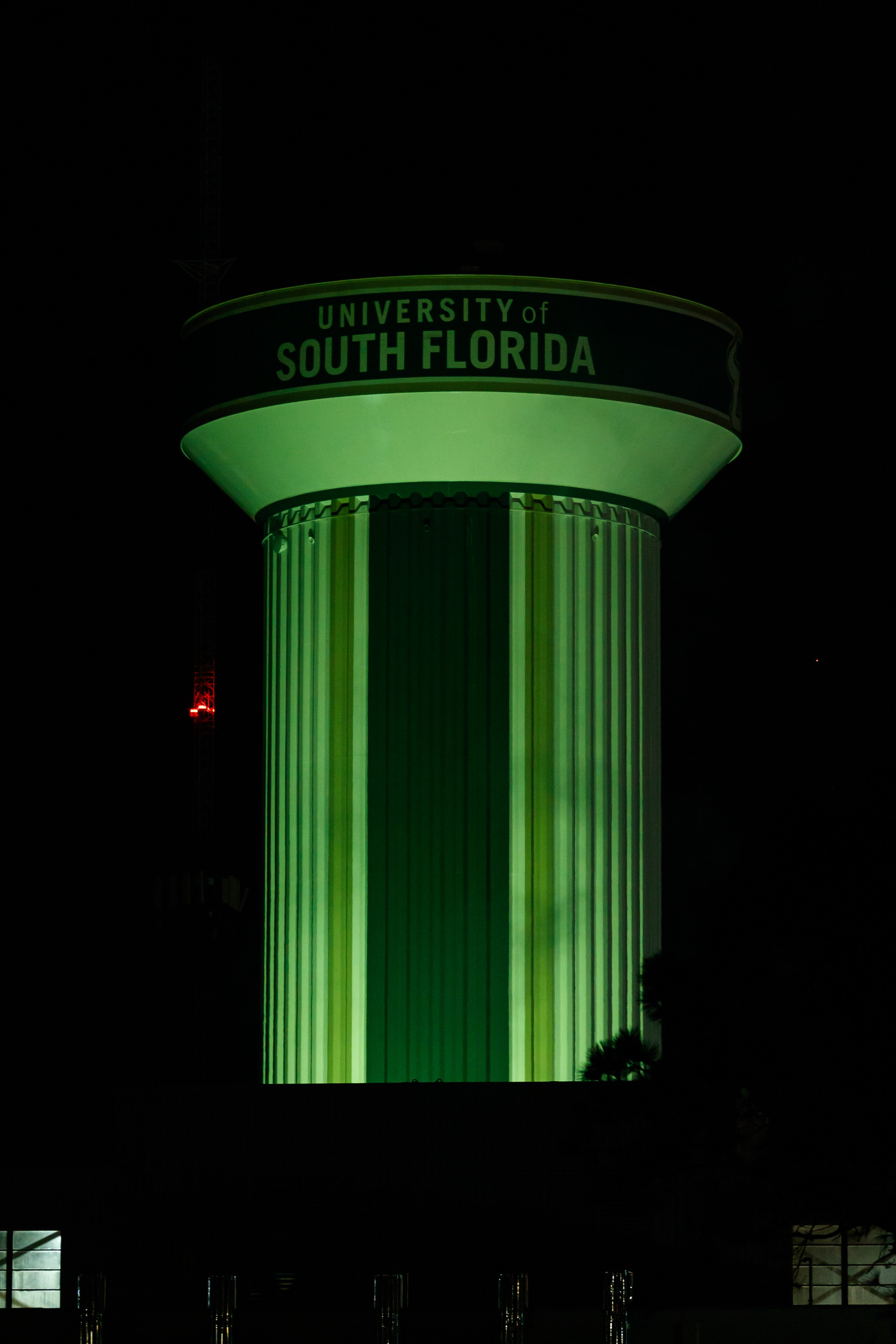
A water tower at the University of South Florida. It is university tradition to light the white canvas of the tower in green lights after winning athletic events.

Water towers can be surrounded by ornate coverings including fancy brickwork, a large ivy-covered trellis or they can be simply painted. Some city water towers have the name of the city painted in large letters on the roof, as a navigational aid to aviators and motorists. Sometimes the decoration can be humorous. An example of this are water towers built side by side, labeled HOT and COLD. Cities in the United States possessing side-by-side water towers labeled HOT and COLD include Granger, Iowa; Canton, Kansas; Pratt, Kansas, and St. Clair, Missouri. Eveleth, Minnesota at one time had two such towers, but no longer does.

Many small towns in the United States use their water towers to advertise local tourism, their local high school sports teams, or other locally notable facts. A "mushroom" water tower was built in Örebro, Sweden and holds almost two million gallons of water.

== Tallest ==
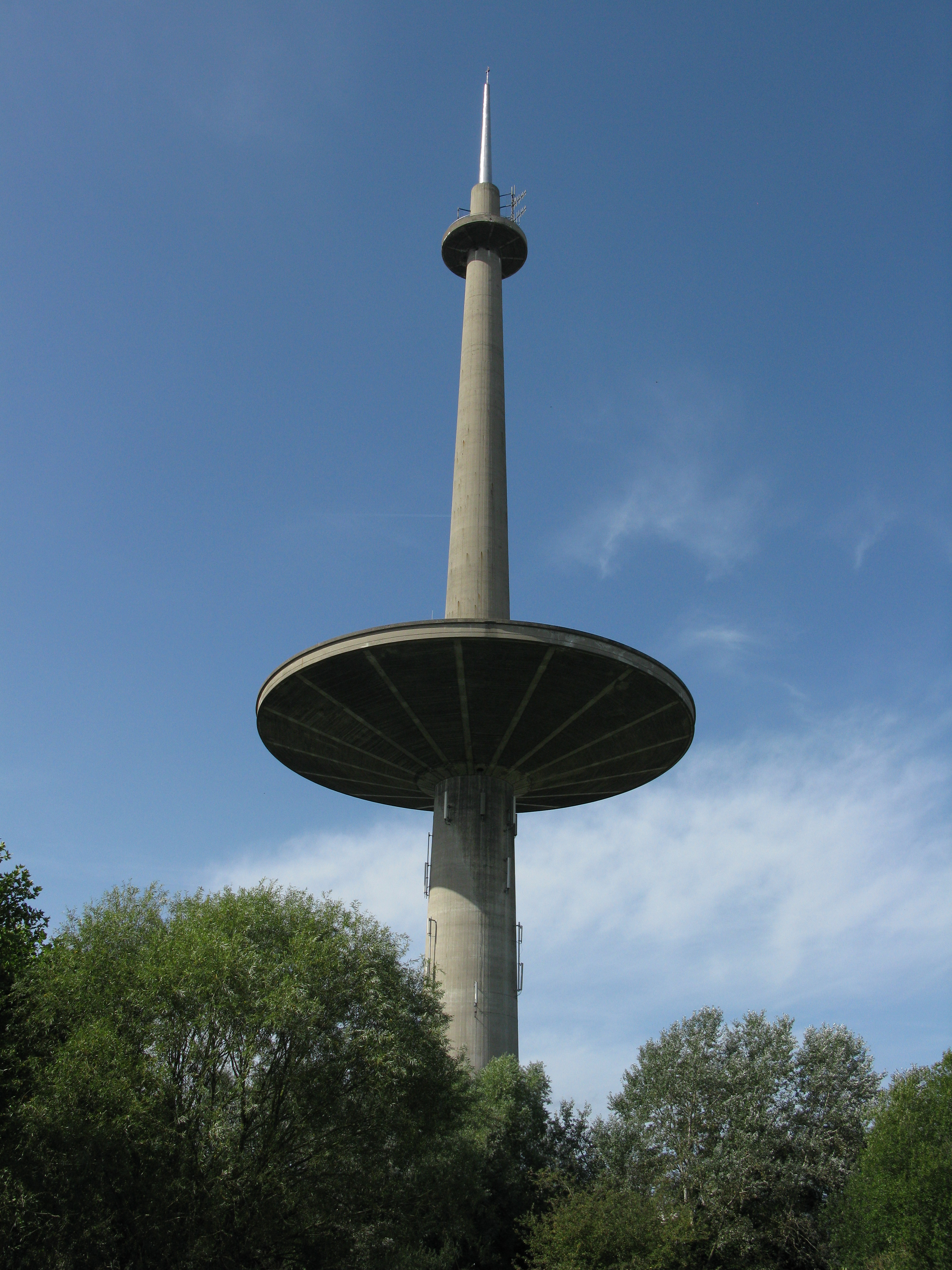
Mechelen-Zuid water tower in Belgium, one of the tallest in the world

Tower	Year	Country	Town	Pinnacle height	Remarks
Swisscom-Sendeturm St. Chrischona	1984	Switzerland	St. Chrischona	250 m (820 ft)	
Naturstromspeicher Gaildorf, Wind Turbine 3,4 and 5	2017	Germany	Gaildorf	246.5 m (809 ft)	Three GE 3.4-137 wind turbines equipped with a water tank in the basement, which is used as upper reservoir by a pumped-storage hydroelectric power plant
Kuwait Towers, Tower A	1979	Kuwait	Kuwait City	187 m (613 ft)	
Eastern Chimney of Saar Central Coke Plant		Germany	Dillingen	150 m (492 ft)	Chimney with water tank
Kuwait Towers, Tower B	1979	Kuwait	Kuwait City	146 m (479 ft)	
Waldenburg TV Tower	1959	Germany	Waldenburg	145 m (475 ft)	Partially guyed tower consisting of water tower and antenna mast guyed to the ground as pinnacle. Antenna mast was dismantled in 2008.
Mechelen-Zuid water tower	1978	Belgium	Mechelen	143 m (469 ft)	Combined water and telecommunications tower
Chimney of Randers Cogeneration Plant	1982	Denmark	Randers	132.9 m (436 ft)	Chimney with water tank
Chimney of ELFE-Fertilizer factory		Greece	Keratsini	132 m (433 ft)	Chimney with water tank
Ginosa Water Tower	1915	Italy	Ginosa	130 m (426.5 ft)	
Large Chimney of Finkenheerd Power Plant		Germany	Brieskow-Finkenheerd	125 m (410 ft)	Chimney with water tank, demolished
Centro idrico Eur	1990	Italy	Rome	120 m (394 ft)	
Chimney of Piesteritz SKW-Nitrogen Factory		Germany	Wittenberg	120 m (394 ft)	Chimney, which was equipped with a water tank
K-1206-F_Watertower	1958	United States	Oak Ridge	116.43 m (382 ft)	Demolished on August 3, 2013, by explosives
Water Tank Chimney of sinter plant of Dillingen Steel Mill		Germany	Dillingen	115 m (377 ft)	Chimney with water tank
Chimney of Brandenburg steel works		Germany	Brandenburg	110,2 m (362 ft)	Chimney with water tank
Small Chimney of Finkenheerd Power Plant		Germany	Brieskow-Finkenheerd	110 m (361 ft)	Chimney with water tank, demolished
Water Tower of Launch Complex 36		United States	Cape Canaveral	107 m (351 ft)	
Chimney 1 of Muldenstein power station		Germany	Muldenstein	103 m (338 ft)	Chimney with water tank, demolished on April 10, 2011
Chimney of Frankfurt-Fechenheim Cassella works		Germany	Frankfurt	102 m (335 ft)	Chimney, which was equipped until 2011 with a water tank
Chimney of Nachterstedt Novelis works		Germany	Nachterstedt	100 m (328 ft)	Chimney with water tank
Chimney of Lahnberge district heating plant	1972	Germany	Marburg	100 m (328 ft)	Chimney with water tank
Chimney of Scholven Refinery Power Plant		Germany	Gelsenkirchen	100 m (328 ft)	Chimney with water tank
Eastern Chimney of Hennigsdorf Steel Works		Germany	Hennigsdorf	100 m (328 ft)	Chimney with water tank
Chimney of Vysocany Incinerator	1932	Czech	Prague	100 m (328 ft)	Chimney with water tank, demolished in 2003

== Alternatives ==
Alternatives to water towers are simple pumps mounted on top of the water pipes to increase the water pressure. This new approach is more straightforward, but also more subject to potential public health risks; if the pumps fail, then loss of water pressure may result in entry of contaminants into the water system. Most large water utilities do not use this approach, given the potential risks.

== Examples ==
=== Australia ===
Bankstown Reservoir was built on reinforced concrete piers, which is one of the oldest of this type in the Sydney region.

- Bankstown Reservoir, Sydney

=== Austria ===
- Wasserturm Amstetten
- Wolfersberg Water Tower (Water tower with transmission antenna)

=== Belgium ===
- Mechelen-Zuid Watertoren

=== Brazil ===
- Nave Espacial de Varginha in Varginha

=== Canada ===
- Guaranteed Pure Milk bottle in Montreal, Quebec

=== Croatia ===
- Vukovar water tower in Vukovar.

=== Denmark ===
- Svaneke water tower

=== Finland ===
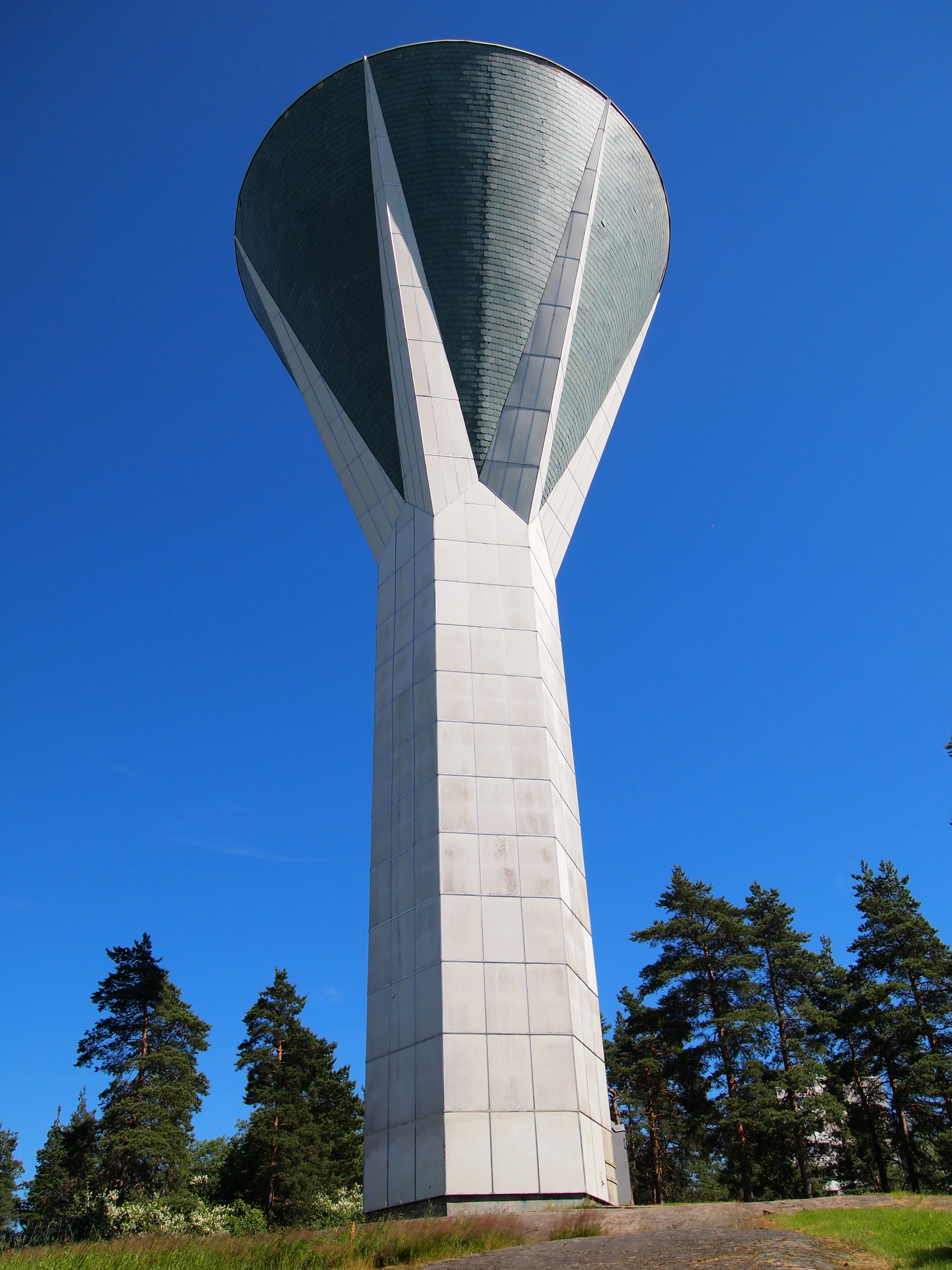
Mustankallio water tower, Lahti, Finland

- Mustankallio water tower in Lahti

=== Germany ===
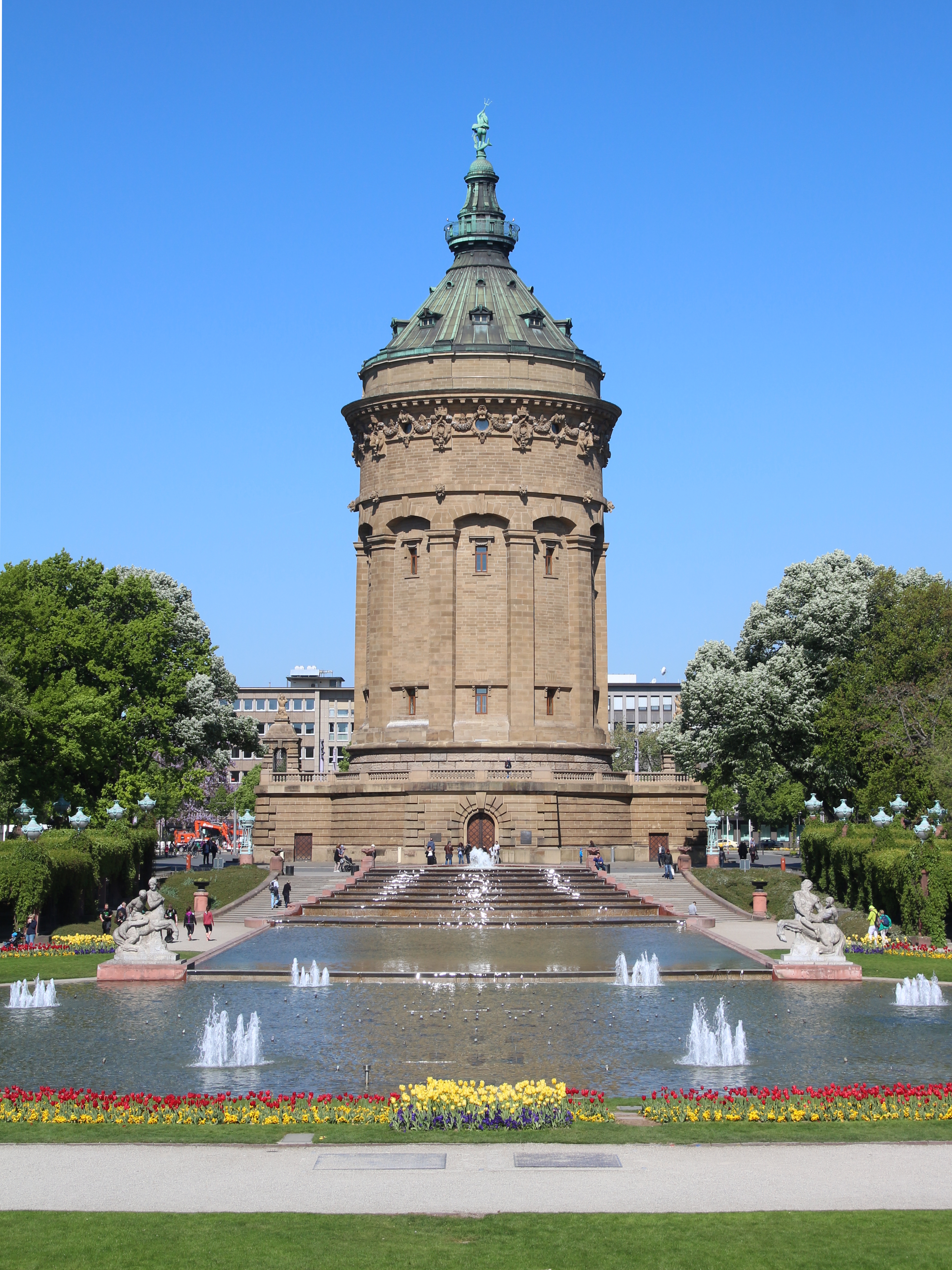
Friedrichsplatz's Water Tower, Mannheim

- Lüneburg Water Tower
- Heidelberg TV Tower (TV tower with water reservoir)
- Mannheim Water Tower (built 1886–1889)

=== India ===
- Tala tank in Kolkata

=== Indonesia ===
- Tirtanadi Water Tower in Medan

=== Italy ===
- Ginosa Water Tower, 122 metres (400 ft) tall

=== Kuwait ===
Kuwait Towers, which include two water reservoirs, and Kuwait Water Towers (Mushroom towers in Kuwait City.

=== Netherlands ===
- Amsterdamsestraatweg Water Tower in Utrecht
- Eindhoven Water Towers in Eindhoven
- Poldertoren in Emmeloord
- Water Tower Simpelveld in Simpelveld
- Water Tower Hellevoetsluis in Hellevoetsluis

=== Poland ===
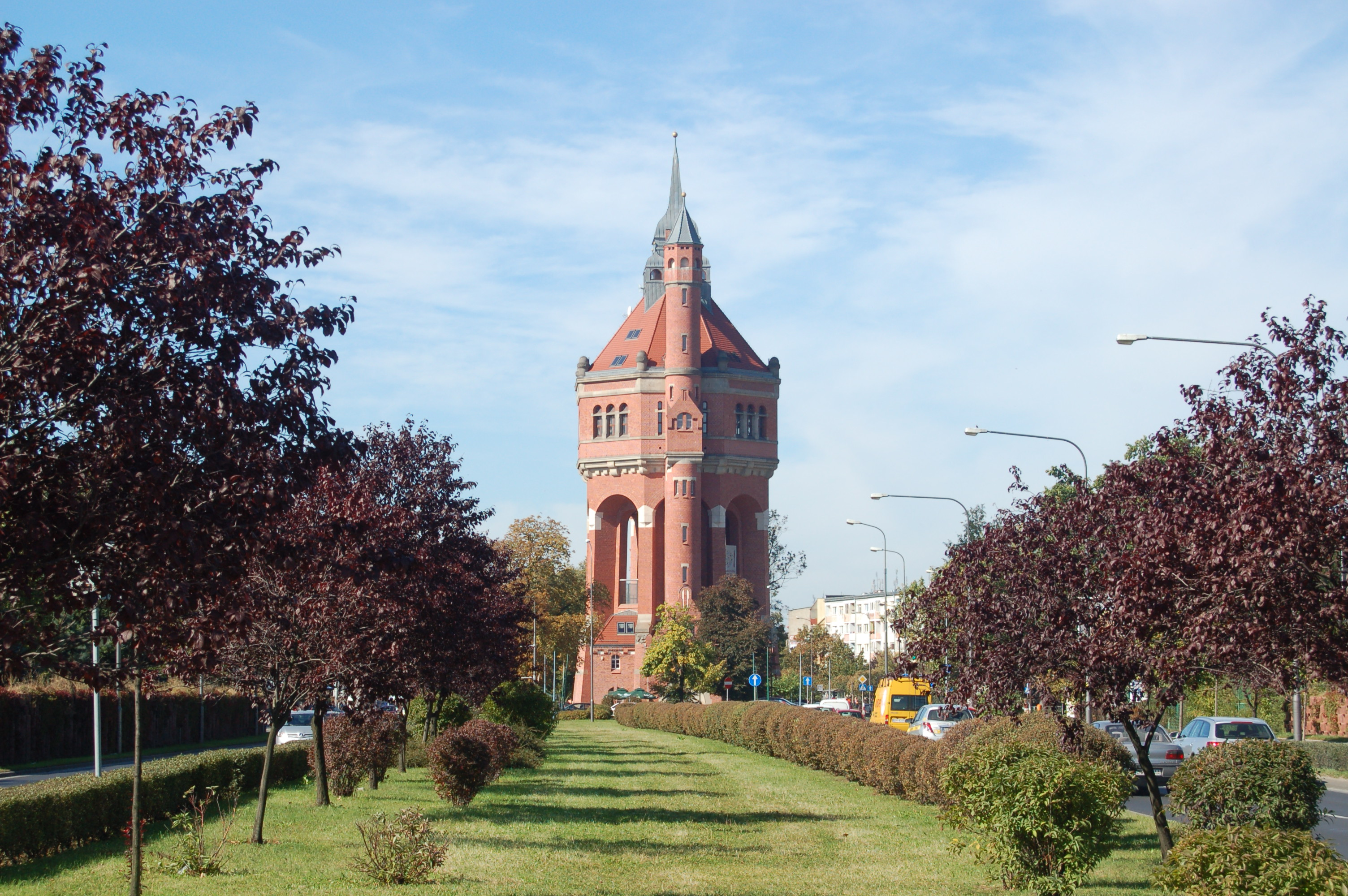
Water Tower, Wrocław, Poland

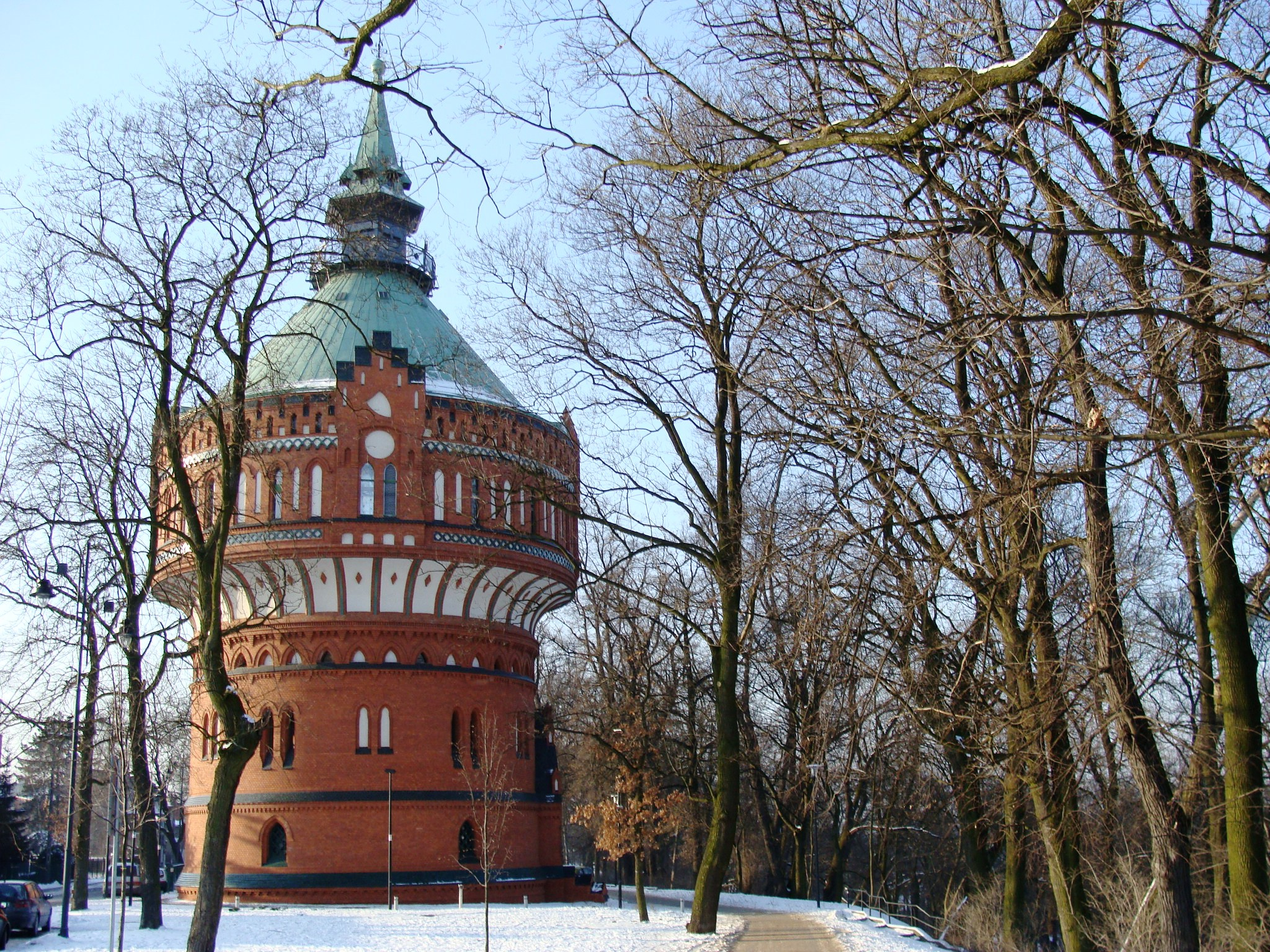
Old Water Tower, Bydgoszcz, Poland

- Wrocław Water Tower
- Old Water Tower, Bydgoszcz

=== Romania ===
- Fabric Water Tower
- Iosefin Water Tower
- Oltenița Water Tower
- Turnu Măgurele Water Tower

=== Saudi Arabia ===
- Riyadh Water Tower

=== Slovakia ===
- Water Tower in Komárno
- Water Tower in Trnava

=== Slovenia ===
- Brežice Water Tower in Brežice

=== Sweden ===
- Vanadislundens water reservoir (Stockholm)

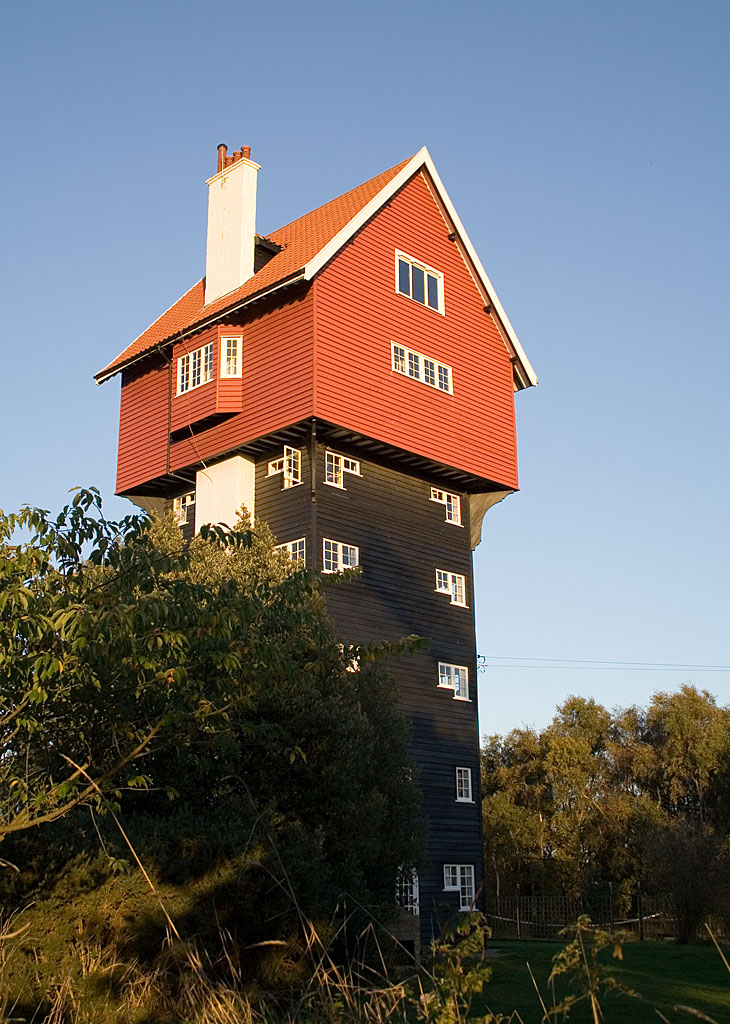
The House in the Clouds in Thorpeness functioned as the town's water tower from 1923 until 1977.

=== United Kingdom ===
- Cardiff Central Station Water Tower
- Cranhill, Garthamlock and Drumchapel in Glasgow, and Tannochside just outside the city
- Dock Tower in Grimsby
- Everton Water Tower, Liverpool
- House in the Clouds in Thorpeness, Suffolk
- Jumbo in Colchester, Essex
- Norton Water Tower in Norton, Cheshire
- Tilehurst Water Tower in Reading
- Tower Park in Poole, Dorset
- Wallasey Water Tower, in Wallasey, Wirral
- Finedon Water Tower, in Finedon, Northamptonshire

=== United States ===
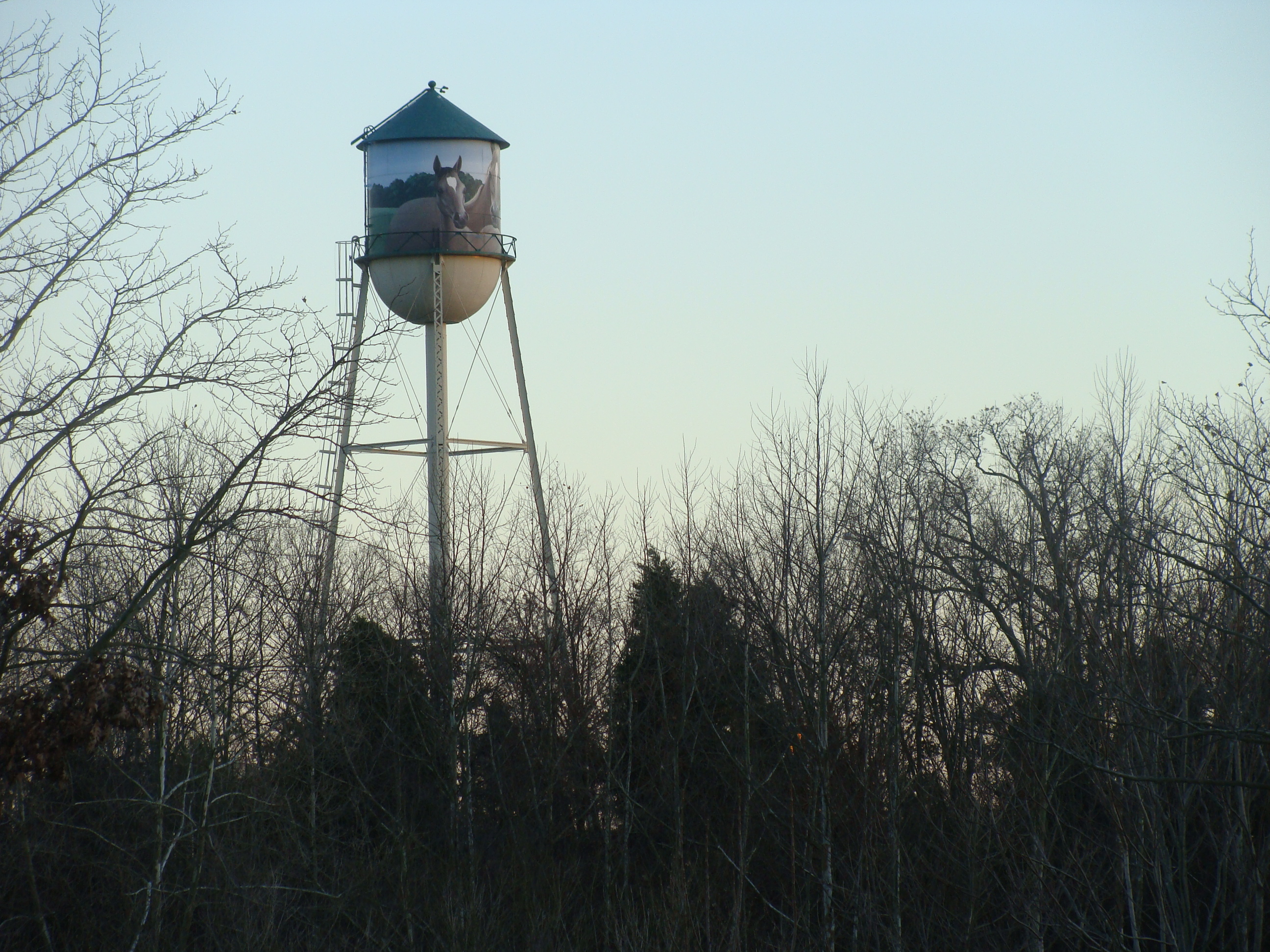
The Show Place Arena water tower in Upper Marlboro, Maryland, U.S.

- Brooks Catsup Bottle Water Tower near Collinsville, Illinois
- Chicago Water Tower in Chicago, Illinois
- Florence Y'all Water Tower in Florence, Kentucky
- Lawson Tower in Scituate, Massachusetts
- Leaning Water Tower in Groom, Texas
- North Point Water Tower in Milwaukee, Wisconsin
- Peachoid next to I-85 on the edge of Gaffney, South Carolina
- Show Place Arena water tower in Upper Marlboro, Maryland
- Union Watersphere in Union Township, New Jersey
- Volunteer Park Water Tower in Capitol Hill, Seattle, Washington
- Warner Bros. Water Tower in Burbank, California (In the animated TV series Animaniacs, it was used to incarcerate the characters Yakko, Wakko, and Dot, as well as to serve as their home.)
- Weehawken Water Tower in Weehawken, New Jersey
- Ypsilanti Water Tower in Ypsilanti, Michigan (Winner of the Most Phallic Building contest in 2003)

== Standpipe ==
A standpipe is a water tower which is cylindrical (or nearly cylindrical) throughout its whole height, rather than an elevated tank on supports with a narrower pipe leading to and from the ground.

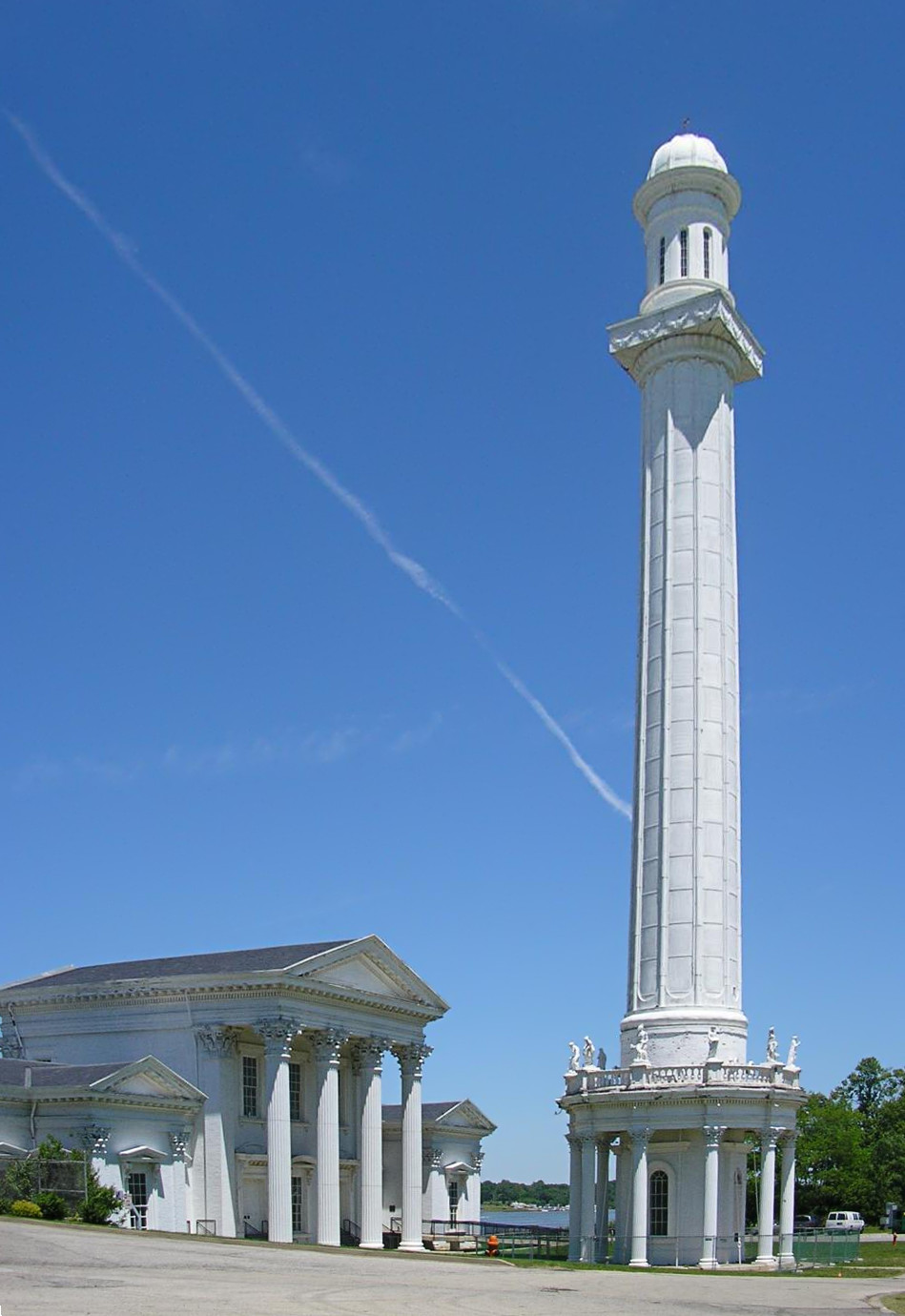
Louisville Water Tower, one of the few remaining standpipe water towers in the United States. It was completed in 1860.

There were originally over 400 standpipe water towers in the United States, but very few remain today, including:

- Belton Standpipe in Belton, South Carolina (also in Allendale and Walterboro)
- Belton Standpipe in Belton, Texas
- Bellevue Standpipe (actually a water tank, not a tower), in Boston, Massachusetts
- Chicago Water Tower, in Chicago, Illinois
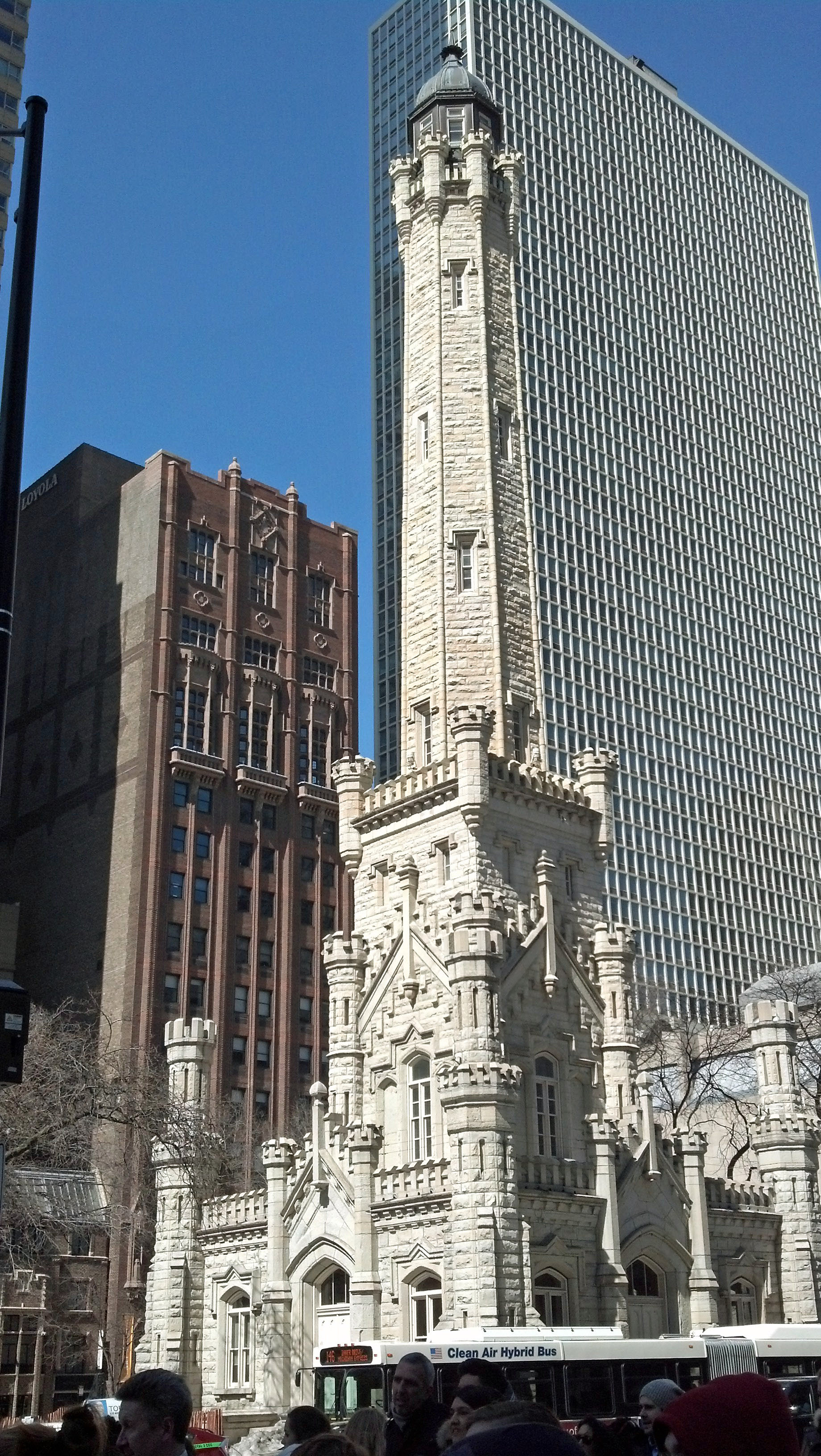
  The Chicago Water Tower
- Cochituate standpipe, in Boston, Massachusetts
- Craig, Nebraska standpipe
- Eden Park Stand Pipe, in Cincinnati
- Evansville Standpipe (a steel tower), in Evansville, Wisconsin
- Fall River Waterworks, in Fall River, Massachusetts
- Forbes Hill Standpipe, in Quincy, Massachusetts
- Louisville Water Tower, in Louisville, Kentucky
- North Point Water Tower, in Milwaukee, Wisconsin
- Park Circle Water Tower, in Arlington, Massachusetts
- Reading Standpipe (demolished in 1999 and replaced by a modern steel tower), in Reading, Massachusetts
- Roxbury High Fort contains the Cochituate Standpipe
- St. Louis, Missouri has three standpipe water towers which are on the National Register of Historic Places.
  - Bissell Tower (also known as the Red Tower)
  - Compton Hill Tower
  - Grand Avenue Water Tower
- Thomas Hill Standpipe, in Bangor, Maine
- Ypsilanti Water Tower, in Ypsilanti, Michigan
- Bremen Water Tower, in Bremen, Indiana

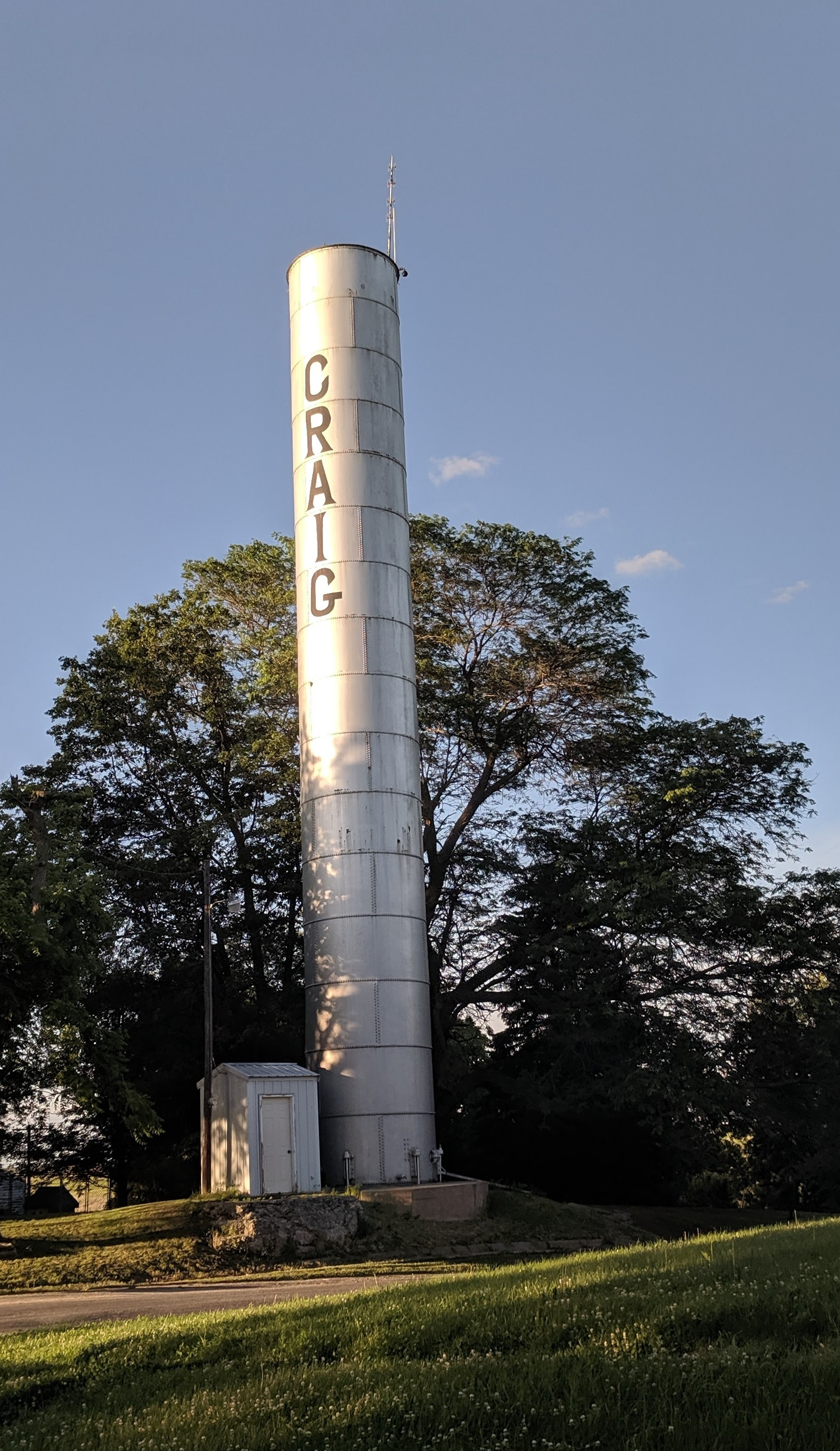
Riveted iron standpipe in Craig, Nebraska, U.S.

== Gallery ==
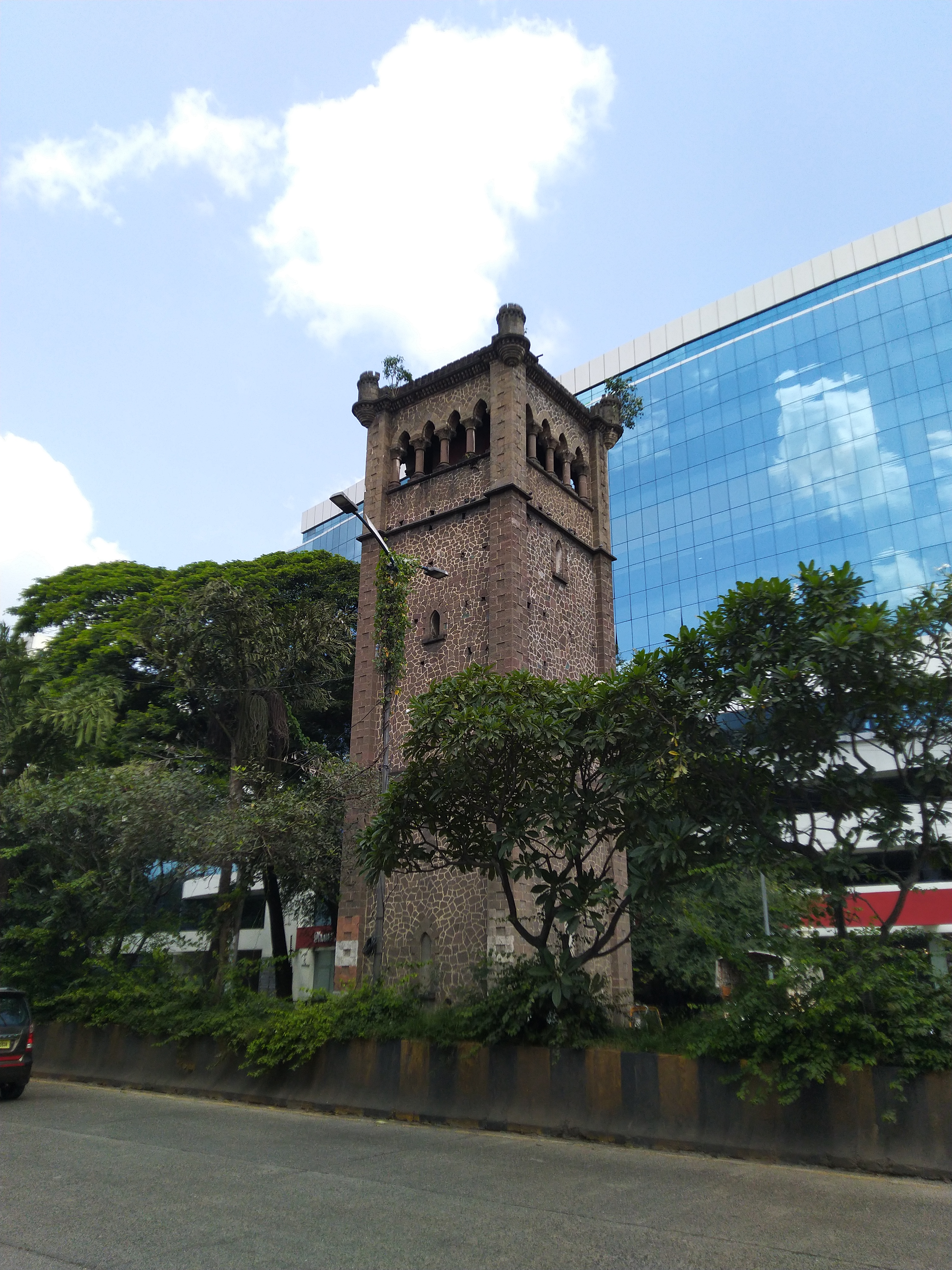
Water tower in Pune, India

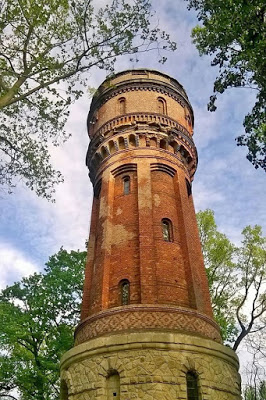
Water tower in Rybnik, Poland

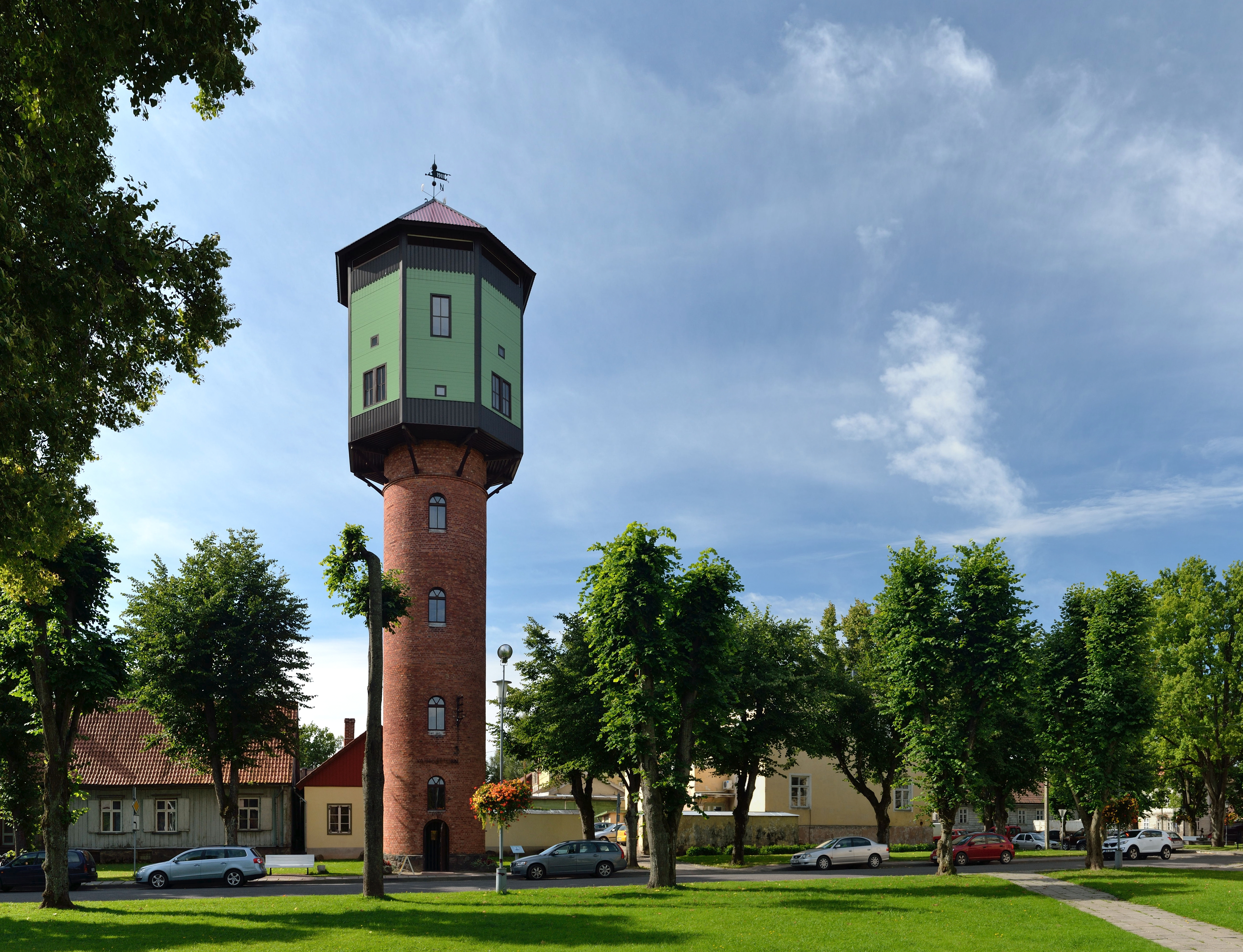
Water tower in Viljandi, Estonia

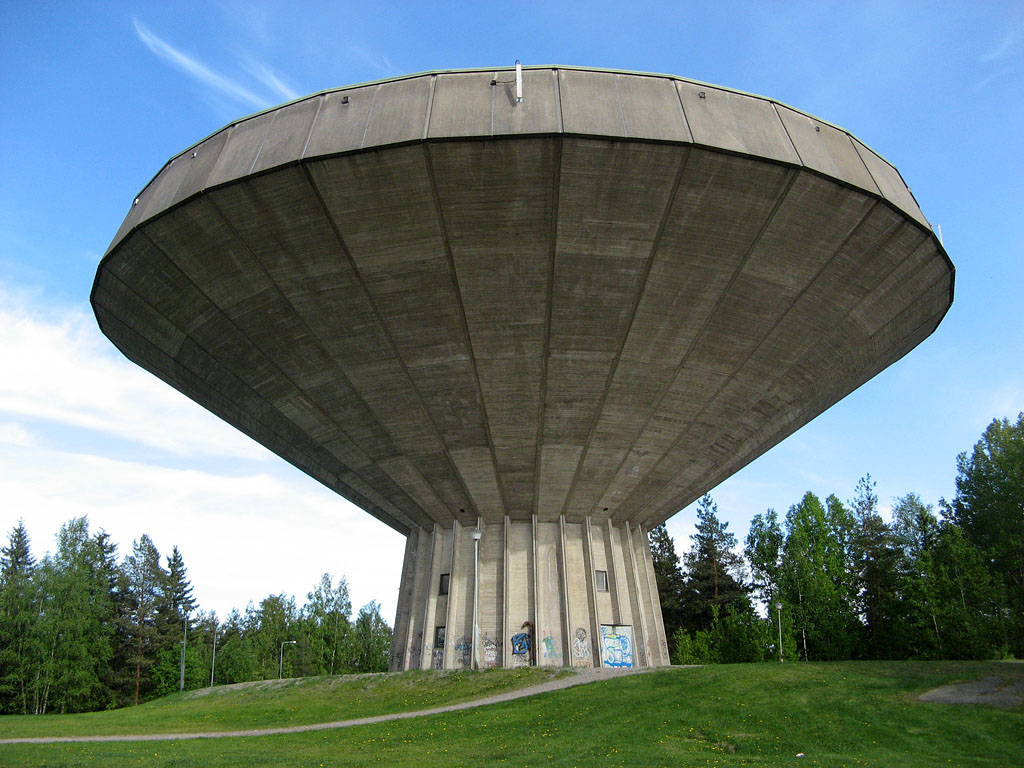
Water tower in Tesoma, Tampere, Finland

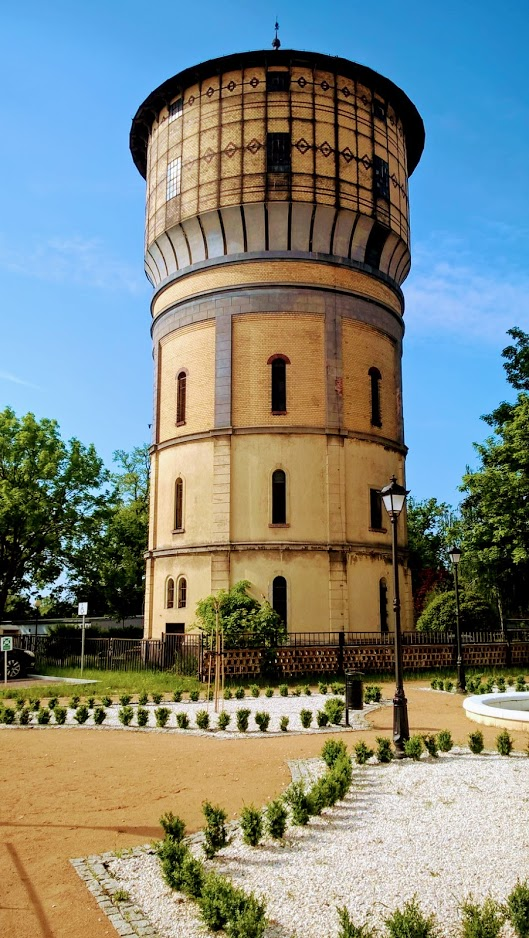
Water tower in Szprotawa, built 1867 by a company J&A Aird from Berlin

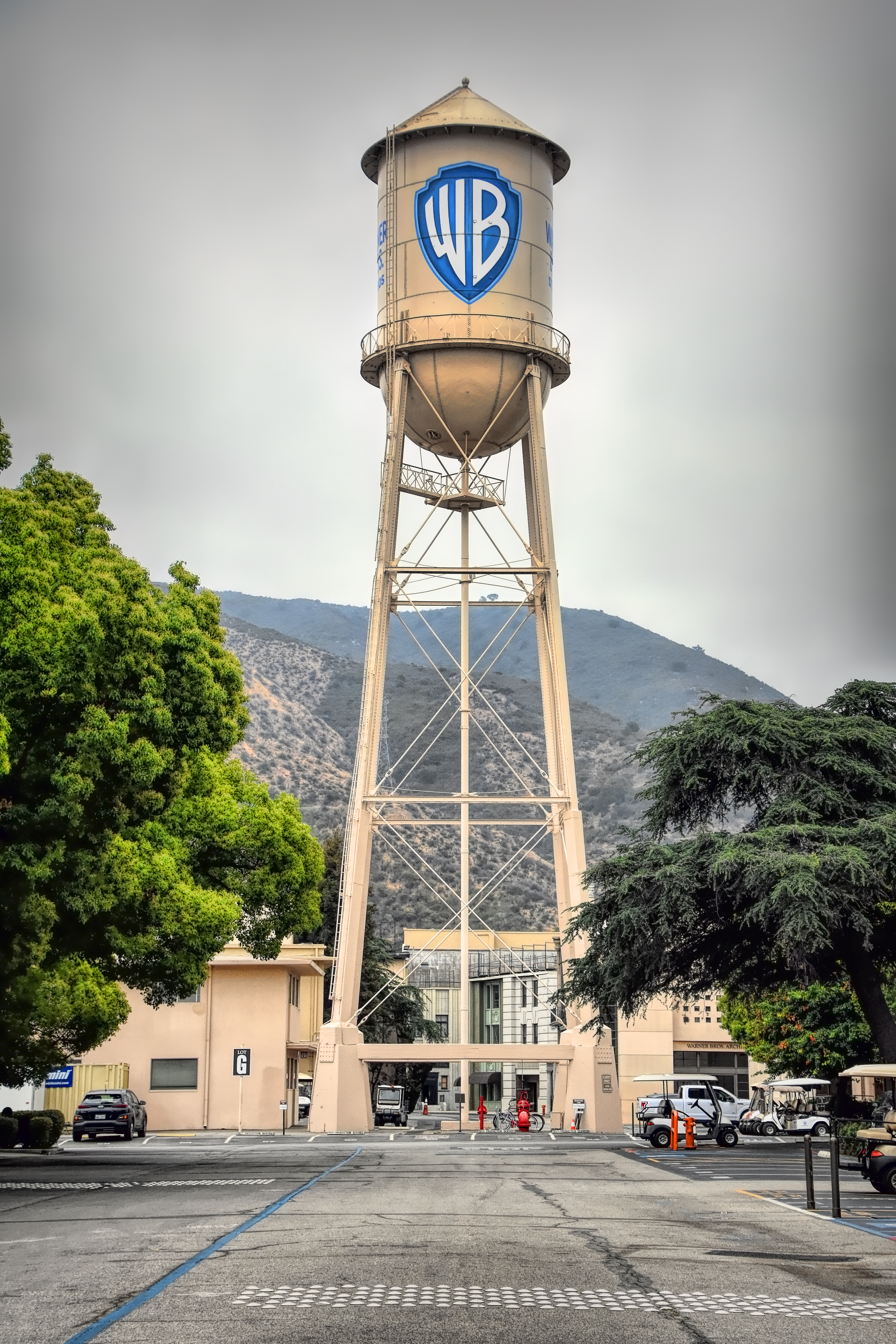
The Warner Bros. Water Tower in Burbank, California, U.S.

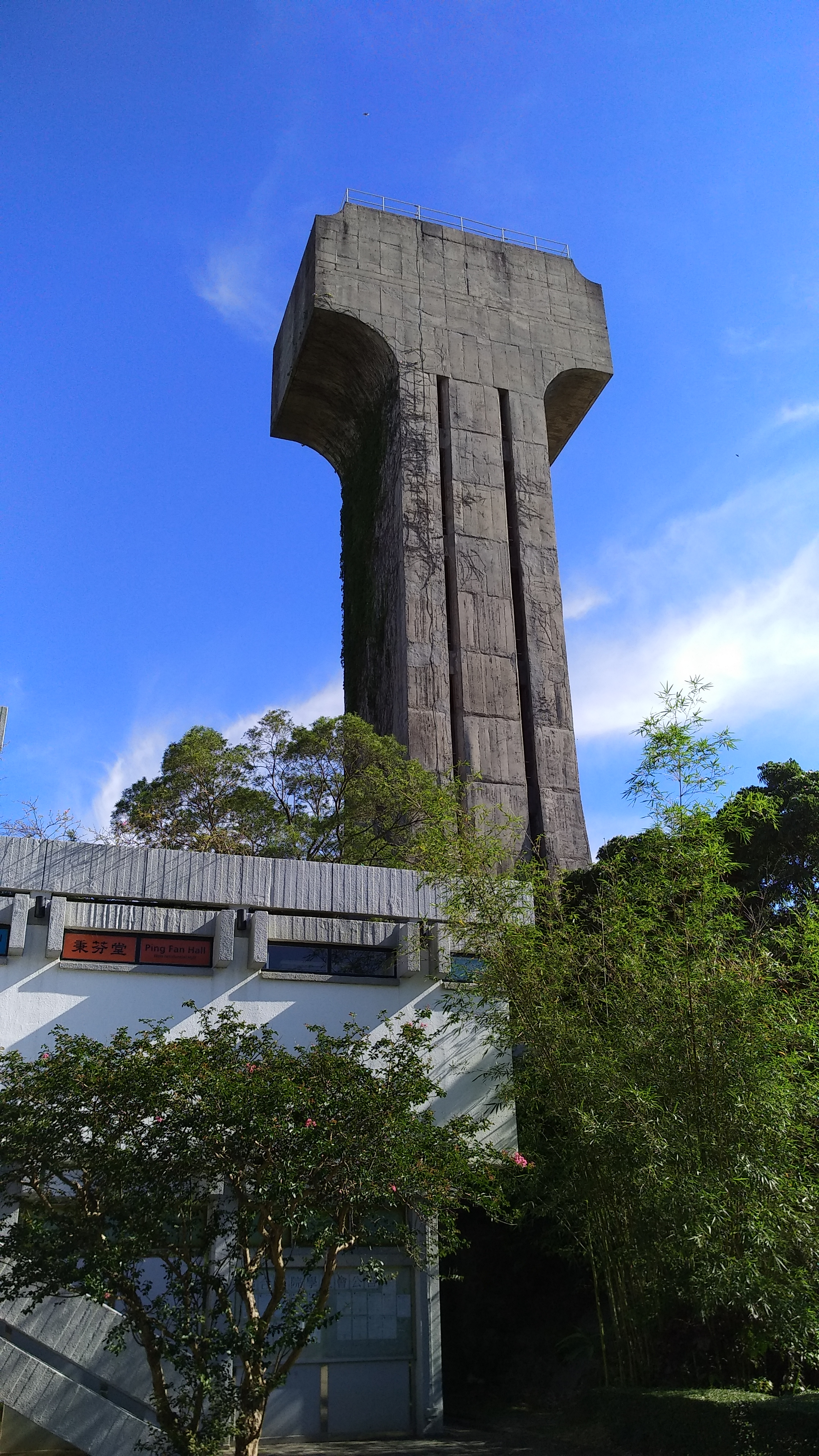
Water tower in United College, The Chinese University of Hong Kong

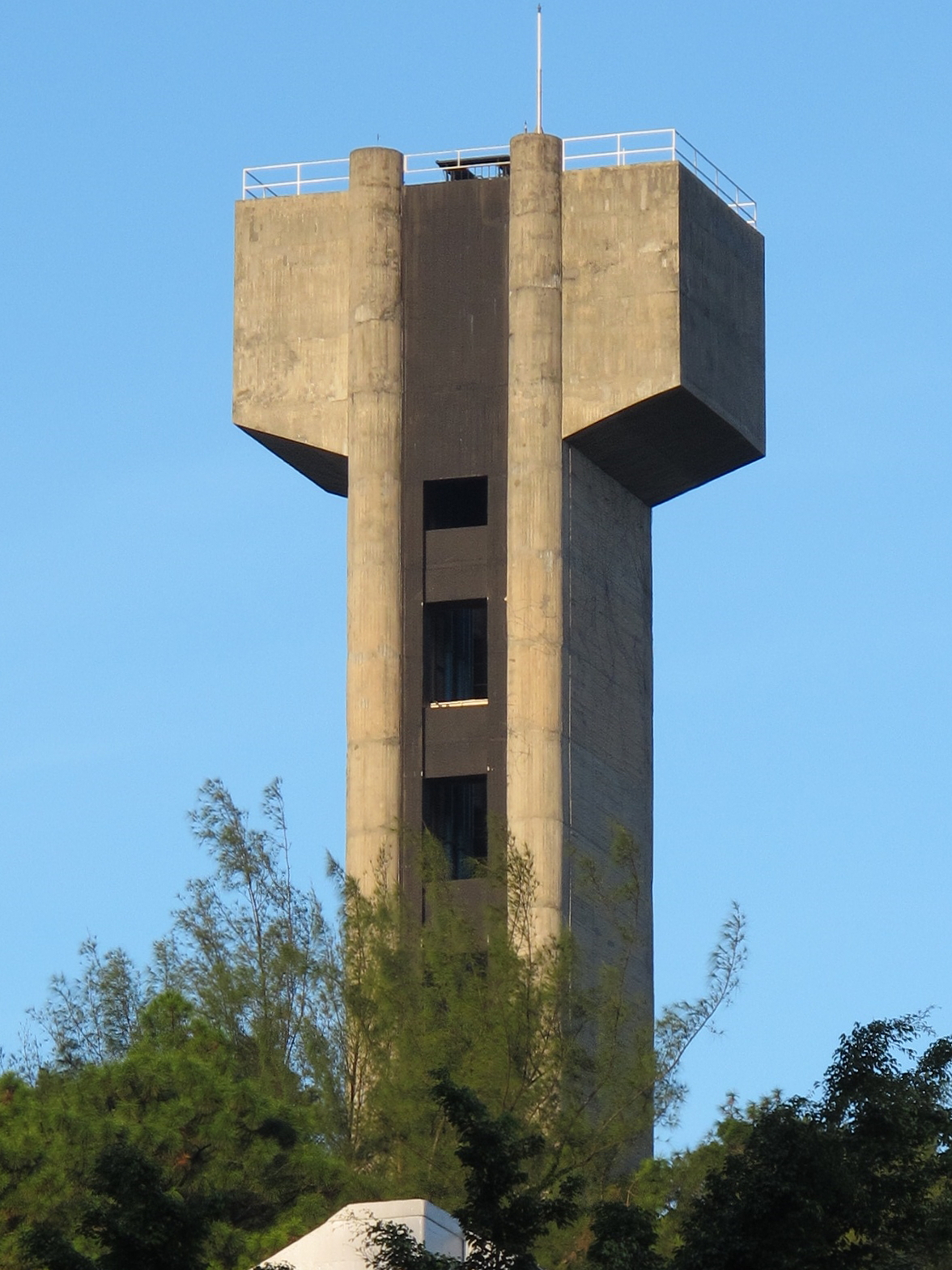
Water tower in New Asia College, The Chinese University of Hong Kong

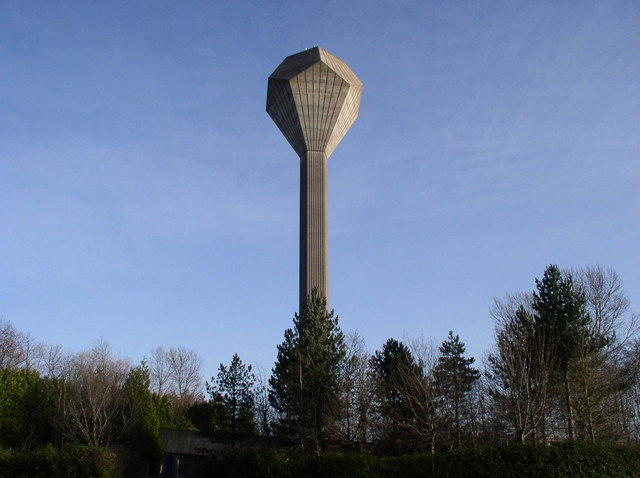
University College Dublin water tower

== See also ==
- Architectural structure
- List of nonbuilding structure types
- American and Canadian Water Landmark
- Caldwell Tanks
- Gas holder, a similar utility storage structure
- Hyperboloid structure
- Pittsburgh-Des Moines Steel Co.
- Pumped-storage hydroelectricity
- Water tank
- Category:Standpipe water towers
