= Mechelen-Zuid water tower =

Water tower, Telecommunications tower in Mechelen, Belgium

- Watertoren Mechelen-Zuid
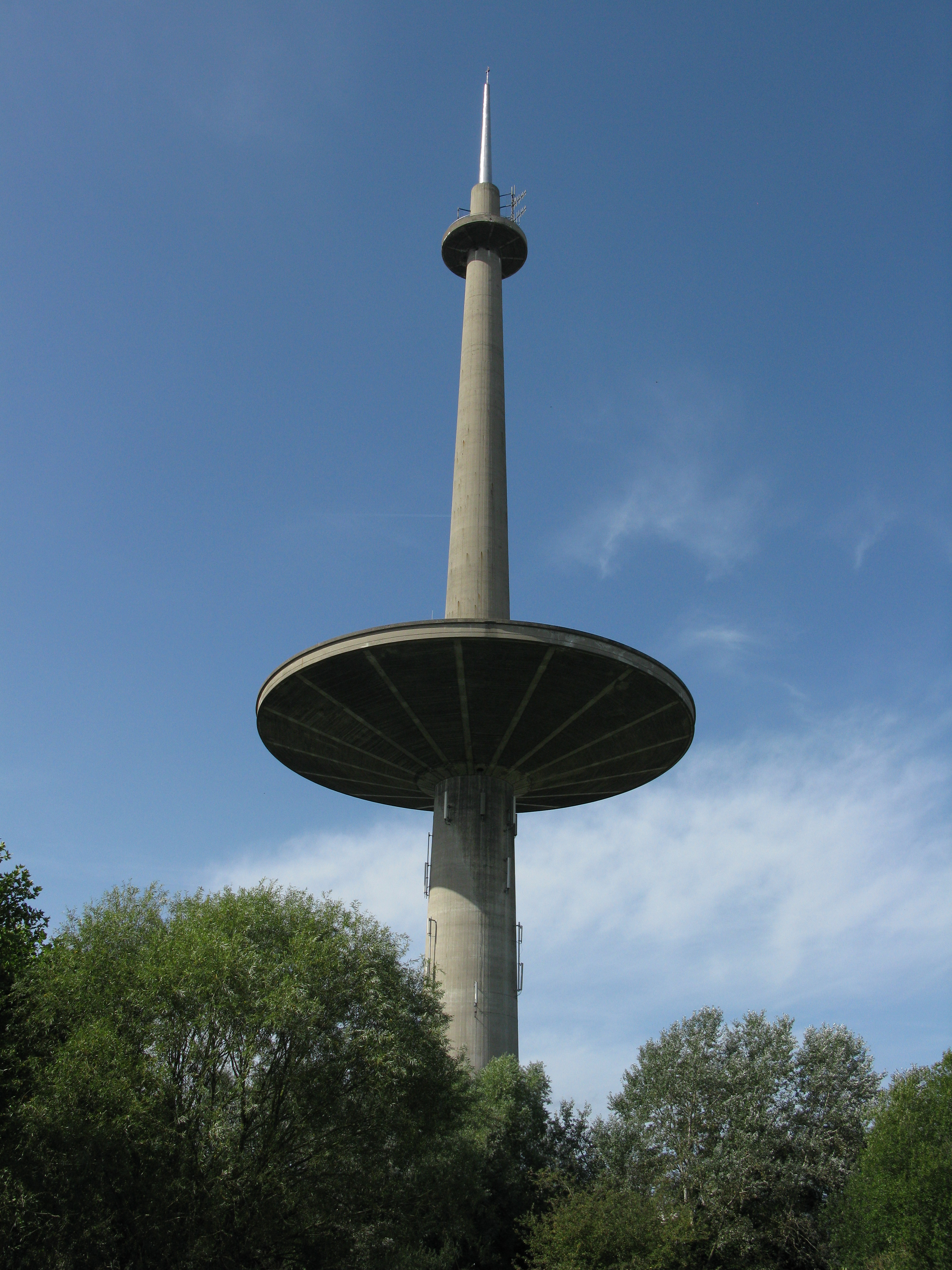
- The tower in 2010

- Location within Belgium

General information
- Type: Water tower Telecommuncatins tower
- Location: Mechelen, Belgium
- Coordinates: 51°00′40″N 4°27′47″E
- Construction started: 1978

Height
- Tip: 143 m (469 ft)

The Mechelen-Zuid water tower is a 143-metre-high (469 ft), combined water and telecommunications tower constructed in 1978. Since 1979, it has supplied the water to the city of Mechelen, Belgium, while also hosting television and telecommunications aerials. The concrete spire passes through a wide disc holding water fifty metres above the ground. Higher up, a smaller disc supports telecommunications equipment. Topped by a decorative stainless steel tube, it is claimed to be the highest water tower in the world.

== Planning, design, and construction ==
This water tower was built to supply an increased demand for water due to the growth of the Mechelen population, and of industry around the city. In March 1977, the City commissioned a design for a water tower with telecom purposes from local engineering firm ITH, who contacted Professor Fernand Mortelmans (University of Leuven), who had been involved with the water tower at Mechelen's northern industrial estate. (Note: 51.059509°N 4.457521°E Mechelen-Zuid Watertoren in Mechelen Noord industrial park. Concrete 55m high.) The tower was constructed at an estimated cost of 85 million Belgian francs in 1978.

The circular foundation is formed by 127 piles supporting a 19.6-metre-diameter (64 ft) concrete foundation slab up to 3 m thick at the centre which is 3.2 m below ground level. It supports a tall conical hollow shaft of reinforced concrete which rises 120 m above ground level. The base is 9.2 m wide with a constant 0.65 m wall thickness to 44 m above ground, at which point the shaft funnels outward to a thickness of 1.84 m over a 7.8 m distance; above this is a 1-metre-high (3.3 ft) and 10.64-metre-wide (34.9 ft) ring beam which supports the water tank, a shallow bi-conical structure 40 m in diameter of 2,500 m^{3} capacity. Above this container the towers's wall thickness is 0.50 m thick, diminishing to 0.20 m; it reaches the smallest diameter of 3.40 m at 120 m. The top of the tower is capped by a 20 m decorative stainless steel structure which narrows from 170 cm to 65 cm at the top, which supports a red warning beacon, a 3 m pole of 15 cm diameter, and a lightning rod.

The main body of the supporting shaft was built up by slip forming. Around it, the water tank was constructed in prestressed concrete at ground level: Stiffness is provided by 0.35-metre-thick (1.1 ft) walls, which subdivide it into sixteen sectors. The 0.30-metre-thick (0.98 ft) tank bottom is angled at 17° to the horizontal, the top surface is shallower. The container was raised into its final position by cables: once in position the lifting cables were used to support the tank body from the ring beam on the shaft, being tensioned within concrete columns. Finally the base of the tank was concreted to the tower shaft.

== Other equipment ==
A 10-metre-diameter (33 ft) platform at about 100 m supports the radio transmission equipment, other telecommunications equipment (parabolic antennas) were positioned above the water tank.

== See also ==
- Radio masts and towers
- List of tallest structures in Belgium
