= Oltenița Water Tower =

Water tower in Oltenița, Romania

Coordinates: 44.0930°N 26.6388°E

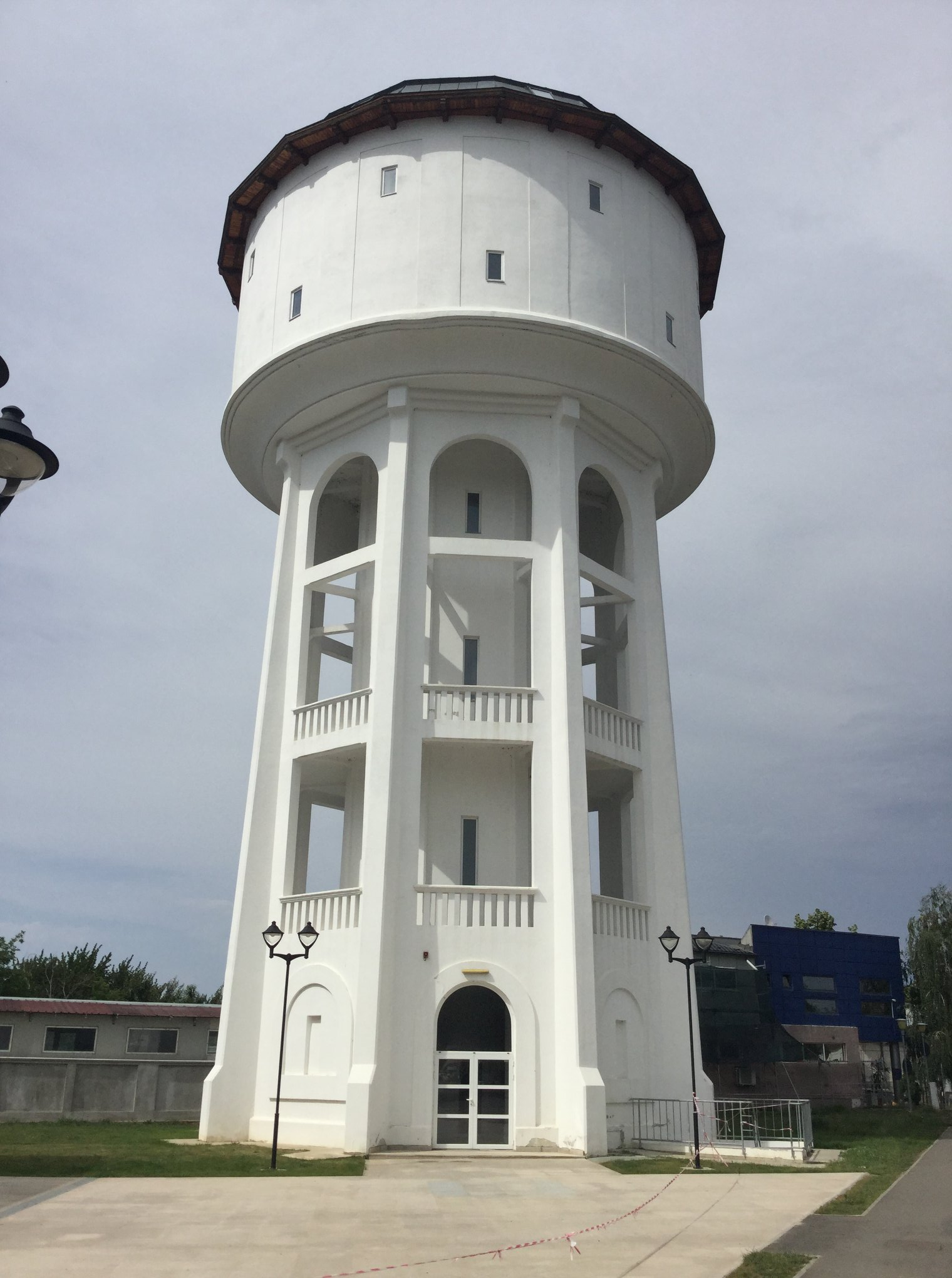
Oltenița Water Tower

The Oltenița Water Tower is a water tower located at 2B Argeșului Street in Oltenița, Romania.

The 34.5-meter high octagonal tower was the town’s first structure made of reinforced concrete. Bidding for the building contract took place in 1913, and it was completed in 1916. Shortly thereafter, it was bombed by the Central Powers in World War I. It was placed in service in 1922 and retired in 1977. It then served as a bar and later was used by homeless people. It was listed as a historic monument by Romania's Ministry of Culture and Religious Affairs in 1992. The tower was later used to host temporary art exhibitions, and as an art museum. The tower later served as a venue for temporary art exhibitions and as an art museum. It was subsequently utilized as a bus station for the "Perbost" school transport line.
