= Turnu Măgurele Water Tower =

Water tower in Turnu Măgurele, Romania

Coordinates: 43°44′41″N 24°51′55″E

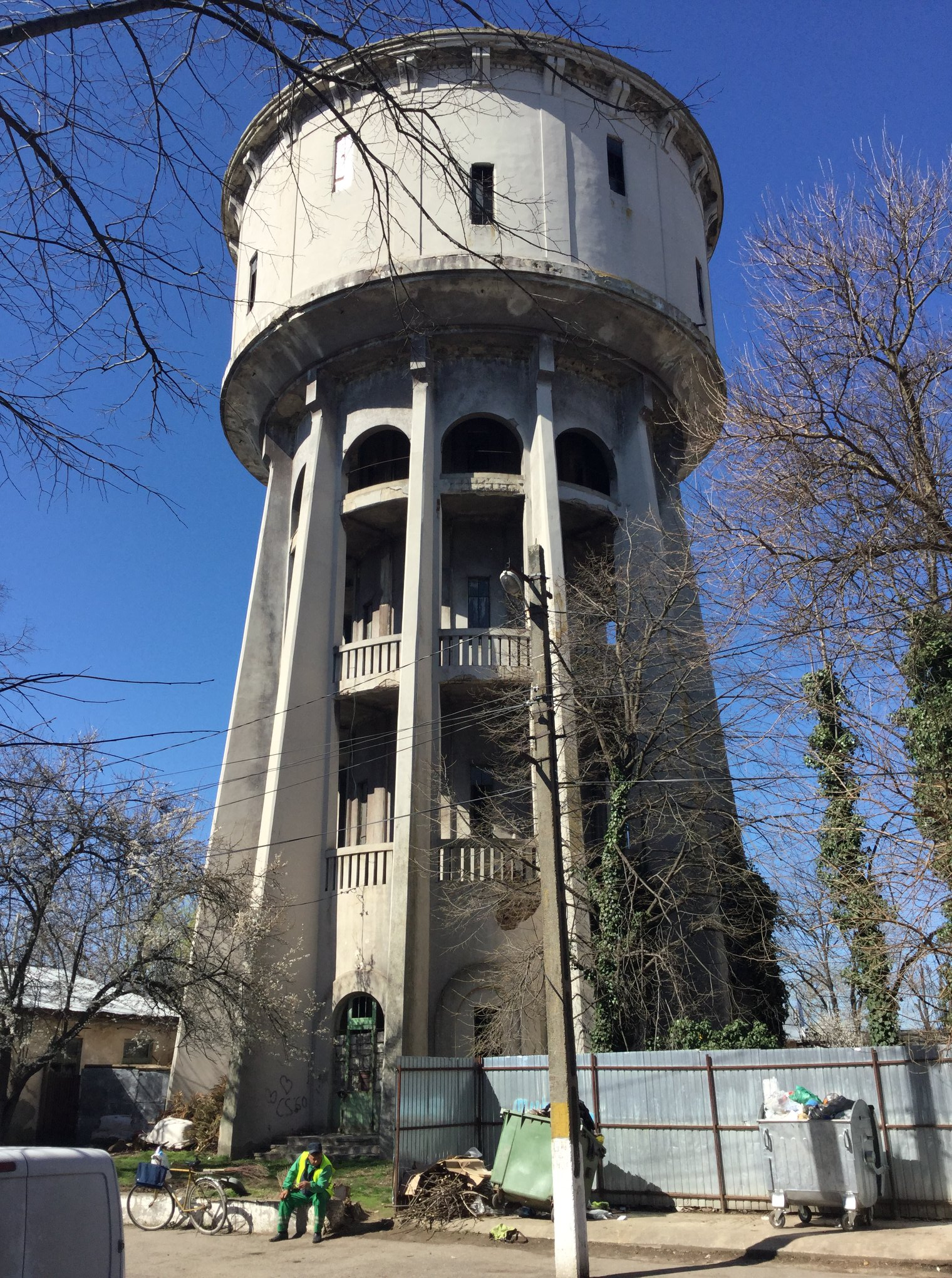
Turnu Măgurele Water Tower

The Turnu Măgurele Water Tower is a water tower located at 1 Decembrie Street, nr. 8, in Turnu Măgurele, Romania.

The structure, which was also used as a fire lookout tower, dates to 1915.

The tower is listed as a historic monument by Romania's Ministry of Culture and Religious Affairs.
