= Water Tower Simpelveld =

Water tower in Simpelveld, Netherlands

- Watertoren in Simpelveld
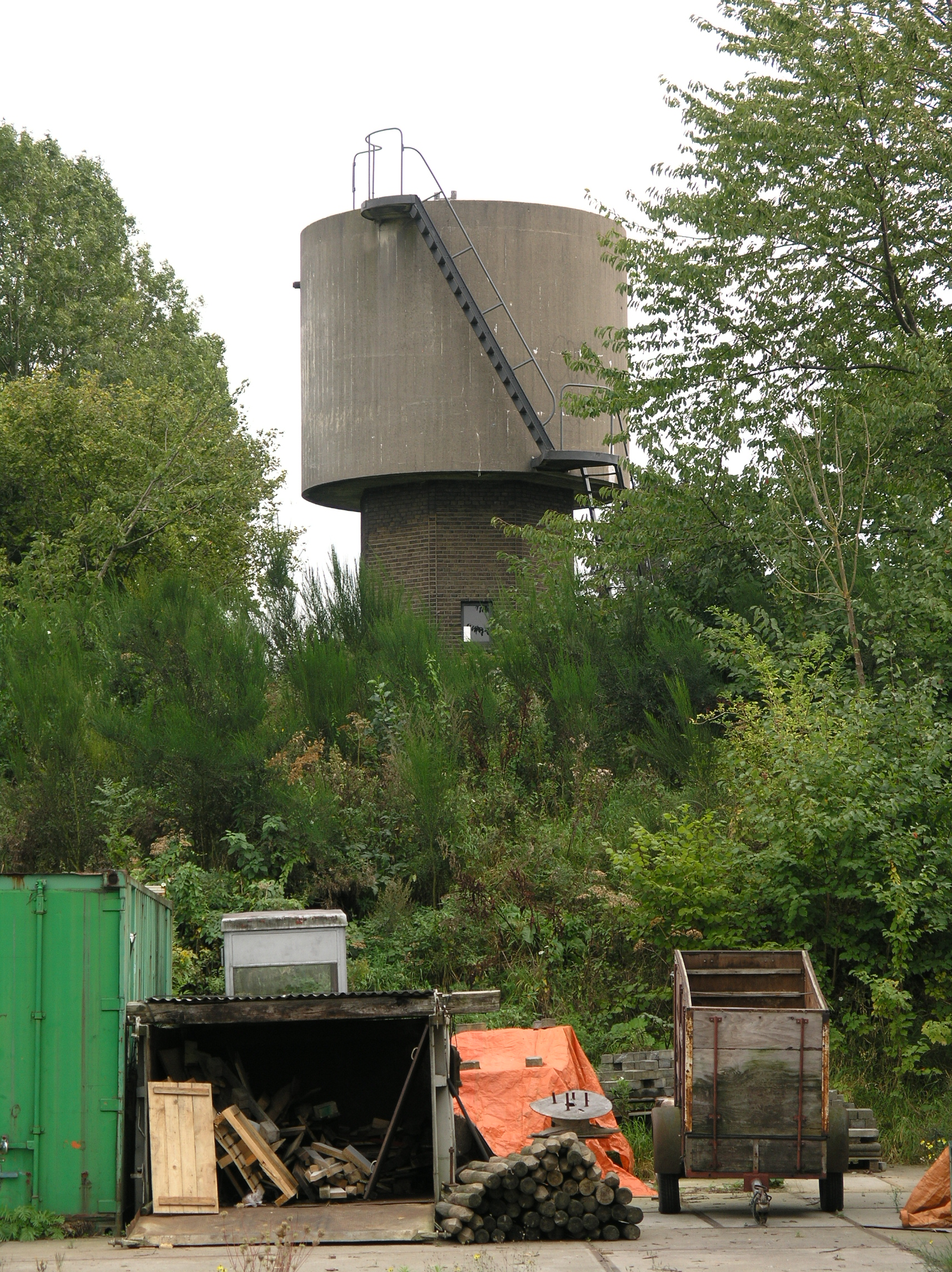
- Water Tower Simpelveld in 2007

General information
- Status: Rijksmonument (518643)
- Type: Watermill
- Address: Vroenkuilerweg 1
- Town or city: Simpelveld
- Country: Netherlands
- Coordinates: 50.830938°N 5.986446°E
- Completed: 1930
- Designations: Water tower

The Water Tower in Simpelveld was built in 1929–1930 by the contractor Meijer from Voerendaal for the nearby miljoenenlijn railway. It has been a heritage site since 2001 (nr 518643) together with the railway turntable which is only a few meters removed.

The water tower is 8.85 metres (29.0 ft) high, built on raised terrain. The round water storage has a diameter of 5.1 metres (17 ft). A dividing wall splits it into two halves of 25 cubic metres (880 cu ft) each. A heating system ensures that the tower does not freeze during the winter.

The water tower was in function till 1954. Since then it has been in use for industrial purposes. In 2002 it received a large maintenance.
