= Eindhoven Water Towers =

Coordinates: 51°24′59″N 5°28′46″E

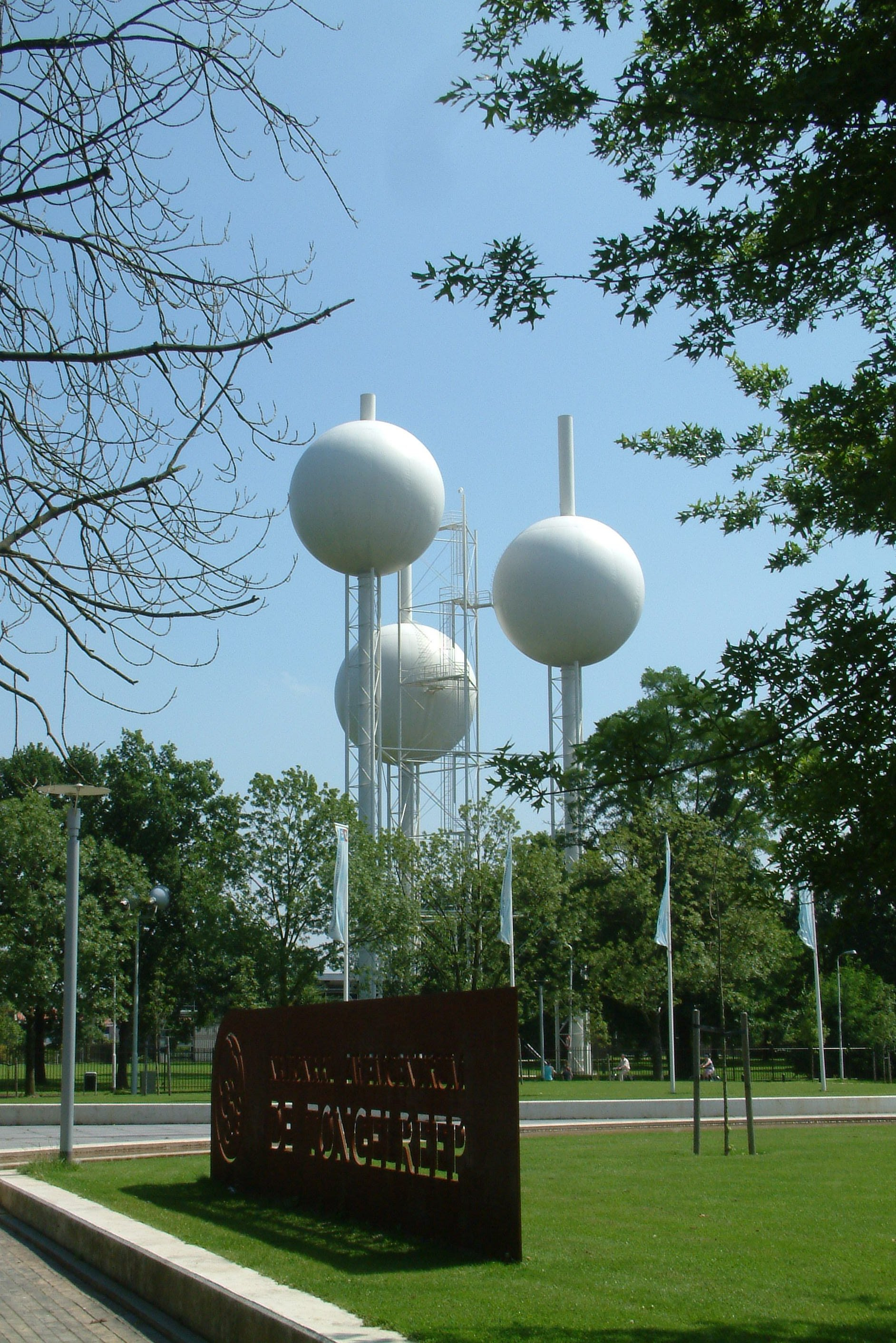
Eindhoven Water Towers (Antoon Coolenlaan)

The Eindhoven Water Towers in Eindhoven, Netherlands, were designed by W.G. Quist (Chief Government Architect of the Netherlands, 1974–1979) and built in 1970.

In the late sixties the older water tower on Willem Elsschotlaan proved to be inadequate. Due to its lack of capacity and general deterioration, the tower could no longer meet the growing demand. Thus it was decided that a new one should be constructed at the Anthony Coolenlaan, around the corner from the existing tower and the water company headquarters.

The structure consists of three spherical tanks, each standing on its own 43.45 m (142.6 ft) spire. Each tank is 10 m (33 ft) in diameter, capable of holding 500 cubic meters of water (132.086 US gallons). The innovative design of three tank-towers together created the largest water tower complex in the Netherlands.

== See also ==
- Union Watersphere
