= National Register of Historic Places listings in Crawford County, Iowa =

Location of Crawford County in Iowa

This is a list of the National Register of Historic Places listings in Crawford County, Iowa.

This is intended to be a complete list of the properties and districts on the National Register of Historic Places in Crawford County, Iowa, United States. Latitude and longitude coordinates are provided for many National Register properties and districts; these locations may be seen together in a map.

There are 13 properties listed on the National Register in the county.

This National Park Service list is complete through NPS recent listings posted April 24, 2026.

	Name on the Register	Image	Date listed	Location	City or town	Description
1	Buck Grove Bridge		June 25, 1998 (#98000797)	Buck Creek Ave. over Buck Creek; 41°54′50″N 95°22′49″W	Buck Grove	
2	John T. and Marietta (Greek) Carey House	John T. and Marietta (Greek) Carey House	April 11, 2005 (#05000276)	1502 1st Ave., N. 42°01′03″N 95°21′06″W	Denison	Designed by architect George Franklin Barber
3	Clarence D. Chamberlin House	Clarence D. Chamberlin House	April 28, 1977 (#77000505)	1434 2nd Ave., S. 42°00′53″N 95°21′07″W	Denison	
4	Crawford County Courthouse	Crawford County Courthouse	July 2, 1981 (#81000232)	Broadway between Ave. B and Ave. C 42°01′01″N 95°21′24″W	Denison	
5	Denison Opera House		February 13, 2023 (#100008627)	1303 Broadway (1301–1305 Broadway); 42°01′00″N 95°21′18″W	Denison	Movie Theaters of Iowa MPS
6	Dow House	Dow House	June 14, 1972 (#72000471)	Prince St. at the southern city limit 41°55′30″N 95°29′50″W	Dow City	
7	Z.T. Dunham Pioneer Stock Farm		August 2, 1993 (#93000652)	Iowa Highway 37, 1 mile northwest of Dunlap; 41°52′03″N 95°37′09″W	Dunlap	
8	Klondike Hotel		October 3, 1996 (#96001060)	332 3rd St. 41°53′26″N 95°14′03″W	Manilla	
9	William A. McHenry House	William A. McHenry House	November 7, 1976 (#76000755)	1428 1st Ave., N. 42°01′05″N 95°21′07″W	Denison	
10	Nishnabotna River Bridge	Nishnabotna River Bridge	March 12, 1999 (#99000309)	310th St. between X and Y Aves. 41°52′00″N 95°16′00″W	Manilla	
11	Nishnabotna River Bridge	Nishnabotna River Bridge	June 25, 1998 (#98000801)	T Ave. over the Nishnabotna River; 41°56′08″N 95°13′08″W	Manilla	
12	Park Motel	Park Motel	June 2, 2000 (#00000565)	803 4th Ave. S. 42°00′43″N 95°21′45″W	Denison	
13	Yellow Smoke Park Bridge		June 25, 1998 (#98000800)	Pedestrian path over an unnamed stream 42°01′36″N 95°19′05″W	Denison	

== Former listings ==
	Name on the Register	Image	Date listed	Date removed	Location	Description
1	Beaver Creek Bridge		June 25, 1998 (#98000799)	July 31, 2020	180th St. between B and C Aves. over Beaver Creek; 42°11′42″N 95°31′02″W	
2	East Soldier River Bridge		June 25, 1998 (#98000798)	July 31, 2020	120th St. over the East Soldier River; 42°03′28″N 95°38′01″W	

== See also ==
- List of National Historic Landmarks in Iowa
- National Register of Historic Places listings in Iowa
- Listings in neighboring counties: Audubon, Carroll, Harrison, Ida, Monona, Sac, Shelby
