= Pittsburgh-Des Moines Steel Co. =

American steel fabrication company

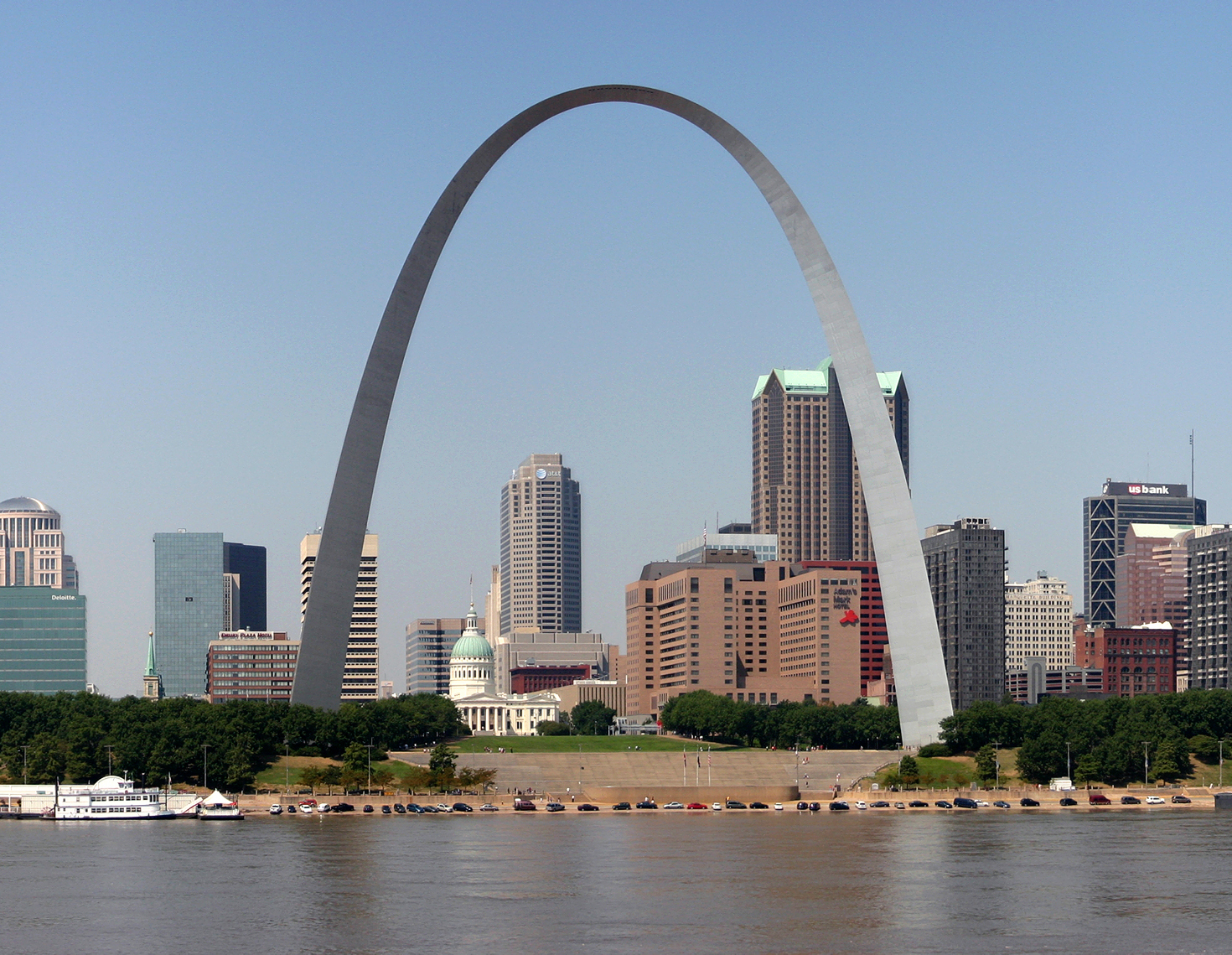
The Gateway Arch in St. Louis. One of many notable structures built by the Pittsburgh-Des Moines Steel Co.

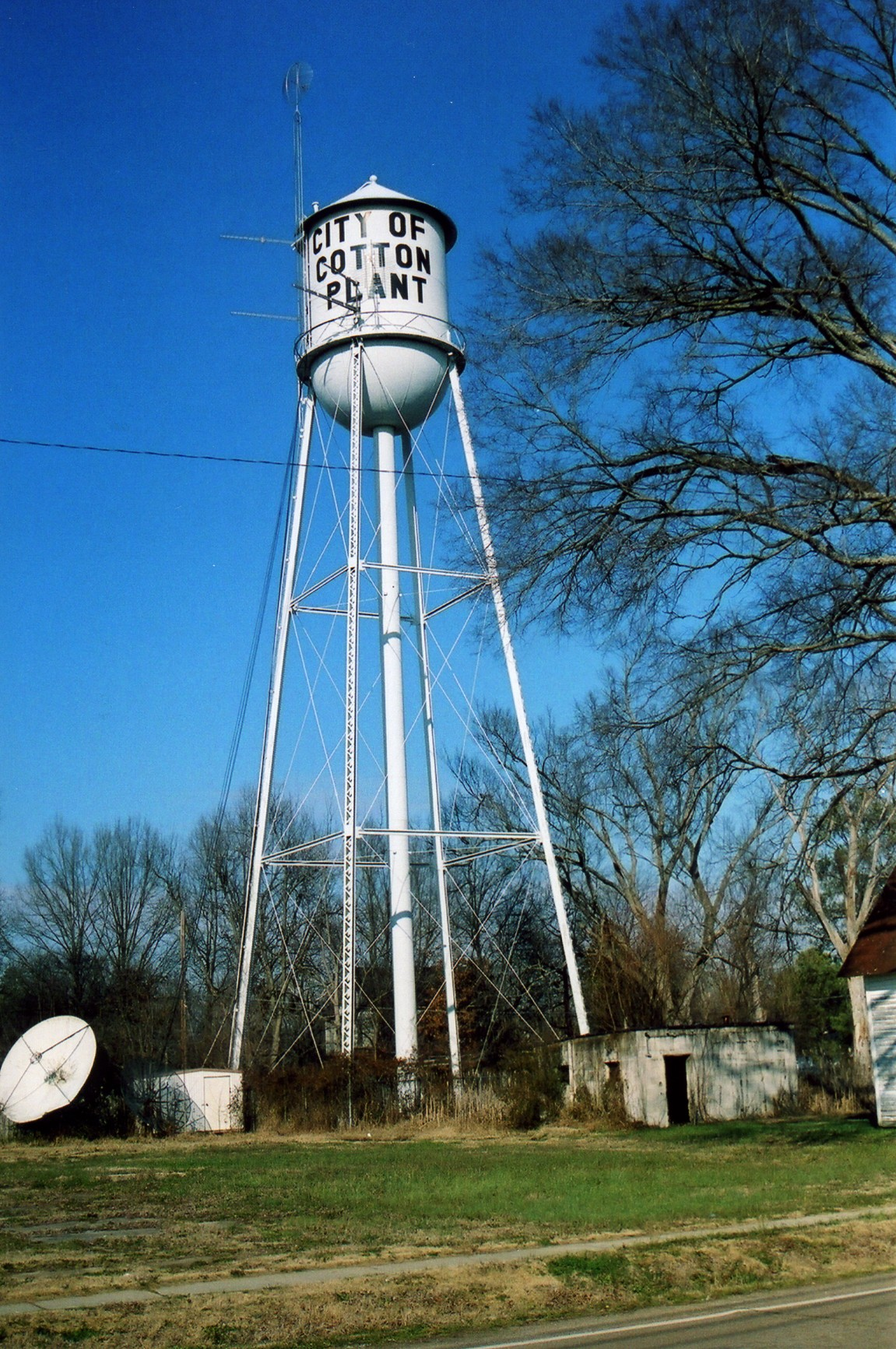
Cotton Plant Water Tower in Arkansas, built 1935 by the Pittsburgh-Des Moines Steel Co.

The Pittsburgh-Des Moines Steel Company (originally the Des Moines Bridge and Iron Company), and often referred to as Pitt-Des Moines Steel or PDM was an American steel fabrication company. It operated from 1892 until approximately 2002 when its assets were sold to other companies, including CB&I (formerly Chicago Bridge & Iron Company). The company began as a builder of steel water tanks and bridges. It also later fabricated the "forked" columns for the World Trade Center in the 1960s, and was the steel fabricator and erector for the Gateway Arch in St. Louis. A number of its works are listed on the National Register of Historic Places.

== History ==
The company was founded in 1892 by two graduates of Iowa State College, William H. Jackson and Berkeley M. Moss. The partners initially contracted to have their steel tanks fabricated by Keystone Bridge Company of Pittsburgh, but soon took on a third partner, Edward W. Crellin, who was operating a small fabricating shop in Des Moines, Iowa. It was at this point that the Des Moines Bridge and Iron Company was formed. The company would ship steel stock from Pittsburgh for the manufacture of a range of engineered products including water towers, bridges, water works and electric plants. Moss left the company around 1905, after a new fabricating plant had been opened in Warren, Pennsylvania, in 1900.

In 1916, the name of the company was changed to Pittsburgh-Des Moines Steel Company, and a new headquarters was opened in Pittsburgh. The partnership remained until 1956, when the company was incorporated. It later became Pittsburgh-Des Moines Corporation in 1980, which was later shortened to Pitt-Des Moines, Inc. in 1985. It had also had registered "PDM" as a trademark as early as 1930.

In July 1993, the original site and fabrication works in Des Moines, Iowa (by then called the Des Moines Heavy Bridge Division) was damaged beyond salvage due to flooding from the Raccoon River, causing the site to be permanently closed, and later sold.

In 2001, the company was acquired by the Chicago Bridge & Iron Company. The Warren plant was closed in early 2009 by CB&I. Also in 2001, the company's steel distribution unit was acquired by Reliance Steel & Aluminum Co.

In 2013, the company sold its steel plants in Eau Claire and Wausau, Wisconsin, and Palatka, Florida, to Veritas Steel LLC.

In 2016, PDM relocated its headquarters to the city of Elk Grove, California, where it remains today.

== Works ==
Works include (with variations in attribution so noted):

- Beaver Creek Bridge, 180th St. between B and C Aves. over Beaver Cr., Schleswig, Iowa (Des Moines Steel Co.), NRHP-listed
- Black River Bridge (Carrizo), Indian Rt. 9 over Black River, Carrizo, Arizona (Pittsburg-Des Moines Steel Co.), NRHP-listed
- Black River Bridge (Pocahontas), US 67, over the Black River, Pocahontas, Arkansas (Pittsburgh-Des Moines Steel Co.), NRHP-listed
- Buck Grove Bridge, Buck Creek Ave. over Buck Cr., Buck Grove, Iowa (Des Moines Steel Co.), NRHP-listed
- Burden Water Tower, US Hwy. 160 W of Maple St., Burden, Kansas (Des Moines Bridge & Iron Co.), 1911.
- Cotter Water Tower, NE of jct. of NE US 62B and State St., Cotter, Arkansas (Pittsburgh Des Moines Steel Co.), NRHP-listed
- Cotton Plant Water Tower, jct. of N. Main & N. Vine Sts., Cotton Plant, Arkansas (Pittsburgh Des Moines Steel Co.), NRHP-listed
- De Valls Bluff Waterworks, jct. of Hazel and Rumbaugh Sts., De Valls Bluff, Arkansas (Pittsburgh Des Moines Steel Co.), NRHP-listed
- East Soldier River Bridge, 120th St. over East Soldier R., Charter Oak, Iowa (Des Moines Steel Co.), NRHP-listed
- Elevated Metal Water Tank, Crosby, West side First Ave. E., bet. First and Second Sts. N., Crosby, Minnesota (Des Moines Bridge & Iron Co.), NRHP-listed
- Elevated Metal Water Tank, Deerwood, 211 Maple St., Deerwood, Minnesota (Des Moines Bridge & Iron Co.), NRHP-listed
- Forsyth Water Pumping Station, 3rd Ave. at the Yellowstone River, Forsyth, Montana (Des Moines Bridge Building Co.), NRHP-listed
- Gateway Arch (1963-1965), St. Louis, Missouri (Pittsburgh-Des Moines was the steel fabricator and erector), designated as a National Historic Landmark
- Hampton Waterworks, Hunt St., W of Lee St., Hampton, Arkansas (Pittsburg-Des Moines Steel Co.), NRHP-listed
- Jefferson Street Viaduct, Jefferson St. over the Des Moines River, Ottumwa, Iowa, NRHP-listed (design plans for a steel viaduct)
- Francis Scott Key Bridge (originally Outer Harbor Crossing) over Patapsco River, Baltimore, Maryland collapsed in March 2024 MV Dali ship crash
- Mineral Springs Waterworks, S. of W. Runnels and S. Hall intersection, Mineral Springs, Arkansas (Pittsburgh Des Moines Steel Company), NRHP-listed
- Missisquoi River Bridge, VT 105-A over the Missisquoi R., Richford, Vermont (Pittsburgh—Des Moines Steel Co.), NRHP-listed
- Monroe Water Tower, 16th Ave. and 20th St., Monroe, Wisconsin (Des Moines Bridge and Iron Co.), NRHP-listed
- Neillsville Standpipe, 325 E. 4th St., Neillsville, Wisconsin (Pittsburgh-Des Moines Steel Co.), NRHP-listed
- Nishnabotna River Bridge, T Ave. over Nishnabotna R., Manilla, Iowa (Des Moines Steel Co.), NRHP-listed
- Sampson Air Force Base water tower, State Rt. 96A, Romulus NY erected in 1962
- State Highway 29 Bridge at the Colorado River, TX 29 at the Llano Cnty. line, Buchanan Dam, Texas (Pittsburgh-Des Moines Steel Co.), NRHP-listed
- State Highway 9 Bridge at the Llano River, US 87, 10 mi. S of TX 29, Mason, Texas (Pittsburgh-Des Moines Steel Co.), NRHP-listed
- US 83 Bridge at the Salt Fork of the Red River, US 83, near Wellington, Texas (Pittsburgh-DesMoines Steel Co.; Texas Highway Department), NRHP-listed
- Waldo Water Tower, E. Main St. W of the N. Skimmer and E. Main intersection, Waldo, Arkansas (Pittsburgh Des Moines Steel Company), NRHP-listed
- Yellow Smoke Park Bridge, pedestrian path over unnamed stream, Denison, Iowa (Des Moines Steel Co.), NRHP-listed
