= H. Gene McKeown & Assoc. =

H. Gene McKeown & Assoc. is an architecture, engineering and construction services firm in Iowa, United States.

A number of its works are listed on the U.S. National Register of Historic Places.

Its works include:

- Beaver Creek Bridge, 180th St. between B and C Aves. over Beaver Cr. Schleswig, Iowa (McKeown, H. Gene & Assoc.), NRHP-listed
- Buck Grove Bridge, Buck Creek Ave. over Buck Cr. Buck Grove, Iowa (McKeown, H. Gene & Assoc.), NRHP-listed
- East Soldier River Bridge, 120th St. over East Soldier R. Charter Oak, Iowa (McKeown, H. Gene & Assoc.), NRHP-listed
- Nishnabotna River Bridge (T Avenue), T Ave. over Nishnabotna R. Manilla, Iowa (McKeown, H. Gene & Assoc.), NRHP-listed
- Nishnabotna River Bridge (310th Street), 310th St. between X and Y Aves. Manilla, Iowa (McKeown, H. Gene & Assoc.), NRHP-listed
- Yellow Smoke Park Bridge, pedestrian path over unnamed stream Denison, Iowa (McKeown, H. Gene & Assoc.), NRHP-listed
