= Nishnabotna =

Nishnabotna may refer to:

- Nishnabotna River, a stream in northwest Missouri and southwest Iowa
  - West Nishnabotna River
  - East Nishnabotna River
- Nishnabotna, Missouri, an extinct hamlet formerly along the river
- Nishnabotna Township, Atchison County, Missouri
- Nishnabotny Township, Crawford County, Iowa
- Nishnabotna Conservation Area, protected area near mouth of Nishnabotna River
- Botna, Iowa, a tiny hamlet along the West Nishnabotna River

== Structures ==
- Nishnabotna River Bridge (disambiguation)
- Nishnabotna Ferry House, a historic house along the East Nishnabotna River
- Nishnabotna High School, a defunct High School of the now defunct Farragut Community School District in Iowa
- Nishnabotna Elementary School, former name for Marnie Simons Elementary School in Hamburg, Iowa
