= Nishnabotna River Bridge =

Nishnabotna River Bridge may refer to:

- Nishnabotna River Bridge (Henderson, Iowa), listed on the National Register of Historic Places in Mills County, Iowa
- Nishnabotna River Bridge (310th Street), listed on the National Register of Historic Places in Crawford County, Iowa
- Nishnabotna River Bridge (T Avenue), listed on the National Register of Historic Places in Crawford County, Iowa
