= Iowa State Capitol Fire of 1904 =

Contemporary view of the Iowa Statehouse Fire

The Iowa State Capitol Fire of 1904 was a conflagration on January 4, 1904, which inflicted significant damage upon the Iowa Statehouse in Des Moines, Iowa, United States. The building, constructed in stages between 1870 and 1886, underwent a major remodeling starting in 1903 that was to substantially change the heating, ventilation, and lighting systems, in addition to adding elevators and making various external improvements to the facility. The fire occurred in connection with this construction work.

The fire was caused by a defective gas-lit chandelier. Six people were injured fighting the flames, with the facility and its associated movable property sustaining damaged estimated at between $300,000 and $500,000 ($11.3 to $18.8 million in 2026). The "consulting engineer" (general contractor) of the project, C.L. Linley of Boston, fell to his death the following day while inspecting fire damage in the building's attic.

== History ==
=== Background ===
Construction of a new state capitol building in Des Moines was a 16-year process, beginning in 1870 and running through 1886. A major renovation of the three-story building was planned to start in the second half of 1903, with scheduled upgrades to include new windows, installation of a new copper roof, a reguilding of the main dome, and conversion of the building's lighting from archaic gas to modern electricity. Decorative artwork was also planned as part of this project, which was to be funded by a $250,000 appropriation initiated in March 1902.

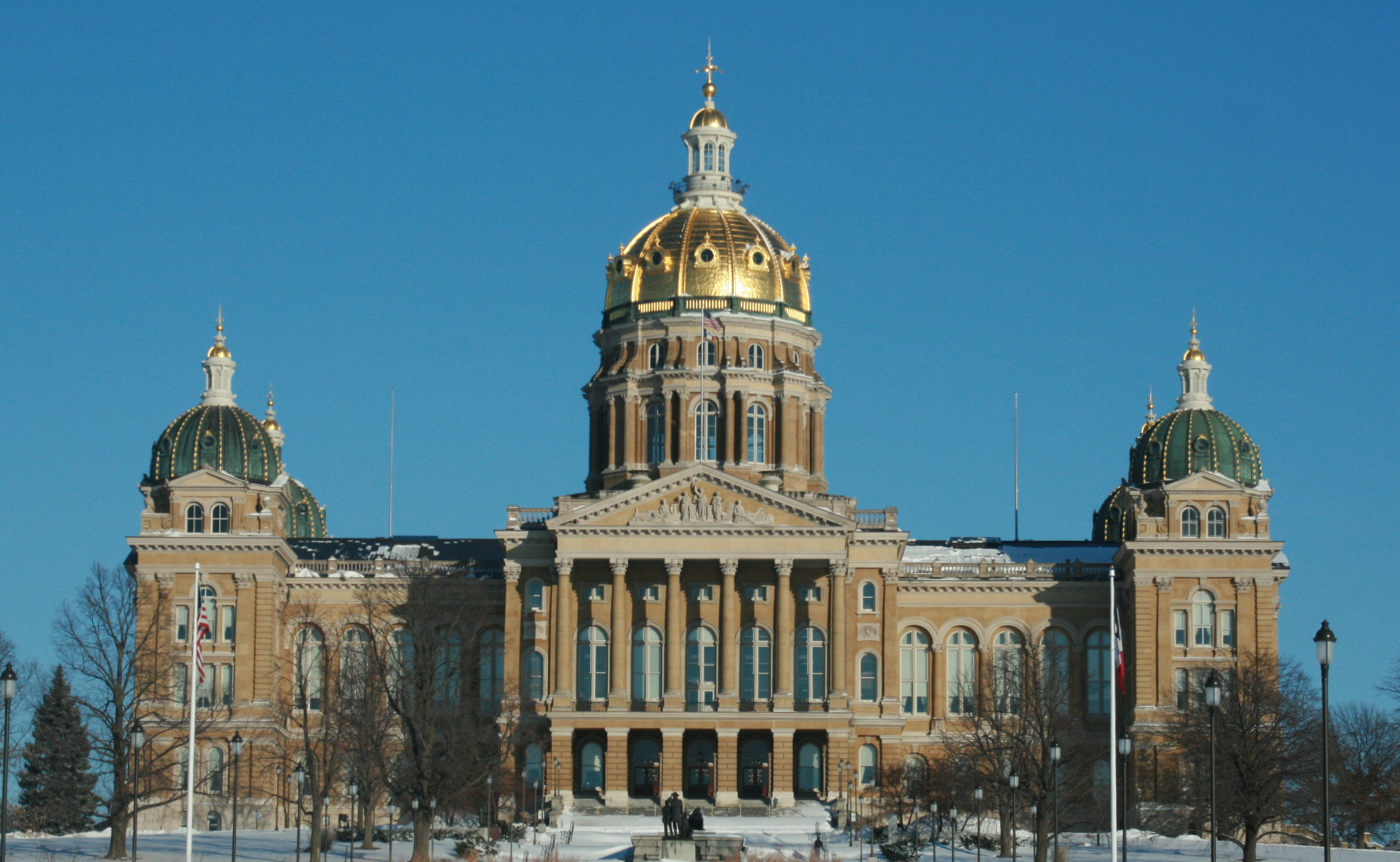
Iowa Statehouse in Des Moines

Throughout the 1902–03 Iowa legislative session, a capitol improvement commission met to finalize planning for the major renovation of the statehouse. Crampton L. Linley of the B.F. Sturtevant Company of Boston and Chicago was hired as consulting engineer and assigned the task of laying out formal plans and specifications for physical improvements, which were to include heating and ventilation, plumbing, elevators, steam boilers, and electrical generators. Linley was to be provided an office in the statehouse to centralize operations on site, with completion of planning in association with "a small force of draftsmen" anticipated to be completed by the end of April 1903, with a view to beginning the bidding process on May 1.

Linley's plans came in on schedule on April 30, 1903, calling for an "almost complete transformation in the capitol in respect to lighting, heating, and ventilation," according to a news report in the Des Moines Register. Exhaust steam from existing boilers was to be converted into electricity in order to "illuminate the building in a brilliant manner, although not expensively," with chandeliers to be removed from the hallways in favor of electric ceiling lights" and stairways and artwork to be illuminated with concealed lights, according to the report. Moreover, "it is calculated the fire risk will be far less than now, as all the wiring is to be laid within steel conduits and in the most careful manner," the report added.

Estimated cost of these internal alterations was pegged at between $75,000 and $80,000 ($2.8 to $3.0 million in 2026), with formal bidding for the work to take place during the month of May, with bids opened on June 1.

By the middle of July contracts had been awarded and installation of electric wiring was well underway, with architect Linley expressing satisfaction with the progress so far made during the initial phase of rewiring legislative offices. Linley stated that it would take the greater part of the summer before the electric wiring process was completed for the entire capitol building.

=== Eruption of the fire ===
At about 10 o'clock in the morning of Monday, January 4, 1904, the first fire alarm was received by the Des Moines fire department — with less than one week until the start of the new session of the Iowa state assembly, the newly remodeled state house was in flames. Half a dozen men had been injured fighting the flames, the Des Moines Register reported, with initial estimates of the loss suffered ranging from $300,000 to $500,000, with the Iowa state architect opining that the latter figure was probably more nearly correct.

Damage to Iowa House of Representatives chamber after the fire

Crampton Linley, the engineer in charge of the remodeling project, was on the scene during the time of the fire and he immediately took action racing throughout the building shutting doors, helping to isolate the fire to the north wing and preventing its spread to other parts of the building.

The fire spread quickly because the majority of the building support structures, including those of the metal-covered dome, were made of wood. Furthermore, there were no water mains on the scene, forcing firefighters to use long rubber hoses of up to 1,500 feet in length. The walls and gallery of the House of Representatives were particularly hard-hit and there was significant damage to a number of committee rooms. The fire was tamed that same day at about 6 pm.

In addition to the injuries and financial loss incurred, with Iowa's largest newspaper noting further inestimable cultural damage to the state the fire had wrought:

The chamber of the House of Representatives, which the capitol commission had labored so hard to put in shape and render fair to look upon, is a mass of charred and smouldering ruins. The galleries, precipitated to the floor below, the false ceiling above, and the expensive chandeliers, are all huddled in one inextricable mass, over which water played all last night, and which bear mute testimony to the evidence fo the element of destruction which so nearly swept Iowa's $3,000,000 capitol away.

While damage had fortunately been contained to the building's north wing, thanks in no small part to the heroism of Linley, offices and hanging artwork were nevertheless severely damaged by the stream of water poured onto the fire throughout the day.

=== Death of architect C.L. Linley ===
Architect Crampton L. Linley, who fell to his death investigating the Iowa Statehouse fire.

The day after the fire, January 5, the tragedy of the event increased exponentially when architect Crampton Linley fell to his death while investigating the origin of the fire in the attic above the gutted legislative chamber.

Immediately after the disaster, the 33-year-old Linley had been placed in charge of the massive reconstruction project which had resulted from the January 4 blaze. During the fire, the center of the roof above the legislative chamber, approximately 50 feet square, had fallen to the floor below, leaving small portions of the existing gallery floor around the perimeter. Linley had been examining evidence in an attic over top of one of these outcroppings when something gave way, causing him to fall 47 feet amidst a cascade of brick and mortar, striking his head on the way down before bounding to the main floor of the house chamber. His skull was fractured with brain matter oozing from the wound when observers on the scene hurried to his aid.

Doctor G.N. Ryan was immediately rushed to the scene, but the fall had proven fatal, with the medic telling a reporter:

"Brains were oozing from the wound and the young man of 30 years presented a pitiable sight. I was unable to do anything for him as he was dying as I arrived. Linley fell from the ceiling of the house chamber where he was working and struck upon a pile of brick. The concussion was sufficient to kill any man and I wonder that he did not die instantly."

Linley died approximately 10 minutes after falling.

=== Cause of the fire ===
Despite Linley's death the investigation into the fire's origin continued. It was ultimately determined that an electrician, working in an airshaft on the second floor of a legislative committee room to install electrical lines and using a candle for illumination, was the cause of the file. From this point of origin, the fire spread up to the attic, it was concluded, with a potential spread to other wings of the building squelched by Crampton Linley's presence and quick thinking, rushing to the attic and closing doors, which effectively held the fire to the north end of the Capitol until fire crews could arrive.

=== Aftermath and legacy ===
Following Linley's death, the capitol commission, headed by State Senator A.B. Funk, placed State Architect Henry Frantz Liebbe in charge of damage repair and renovation, assisted by B.N. Moss of the Des Moines Bridge and Iron Works, an expert in steel construction.

The 30th General Assembly of the Iowa Legislature convened for the first time on schedule the Monday after the fire, January 11, with the House of Representatives, their own chamber ruined, meeting in the undamaged chambers of the State Senate, while the Senate moved to occupy the facilities in the same building used by the Iowa Supreme Court.
