= Anolis carpenteri =

Carpenter's anole

Conservation status
- Least Concern (IUCN 3.1)

Scientific classification
- Kingdom: Animalia
- Phylum: Chordata
- Class: Reptilia
- Order: Squamata
- Suborder: Iguania
- Family: Dactyloidae
- Genus: Anolis
- Species: A. carpenteri

Binomial name
- Anolis carpenteri A.A. Echelle, A.F. Echelle & Fitch, 1971

Synonyms
- Anolis carpenteri A.A. Echelle, A.F. Echelle & Fitch, 1971; Norops carpenteri — Guyer & J.M. Savage, 1986

Species of lizard

Anolis carpenteri, also known commonly as Carpenter's anole or the carpenter anole is a species of lizard in the family Dactyloidae. The species is endemic to Central America.

== Etymology ==
The specific name, carpenteri, is in honor of American herpetologist Charles Congden Carpenter.

== Description ==
A. carpenteri is a small, green lizard with an orange dewlap and smooth ventral scales.

== Habitat ==
Carpenter's anole prefers relatively open habitat in the lowland interface between land and watercourses, and is adapted for climbing on lichen-covered rocks, tree trunks, and shrubs.

== Geographic range ==
A. carpenteri is found in Costa Rica, Nicaragua, and Panama. In Costa Rica it is found in Amistad Caribe, Huetar Norte, Cordillera Volcanica Central, Guanacaste, Tortuguero.

The type locality is Río Reventazón, Turrialba, Cartago Province, Costa Rica.

== Diet ==
A. carpenteri feeds on arthropods, primarily insects.

== Reproduction ==
A. carpenteri is oviparous.
