= Forsyth Water Pumping Station =

- U.S. National Register of Historic Places
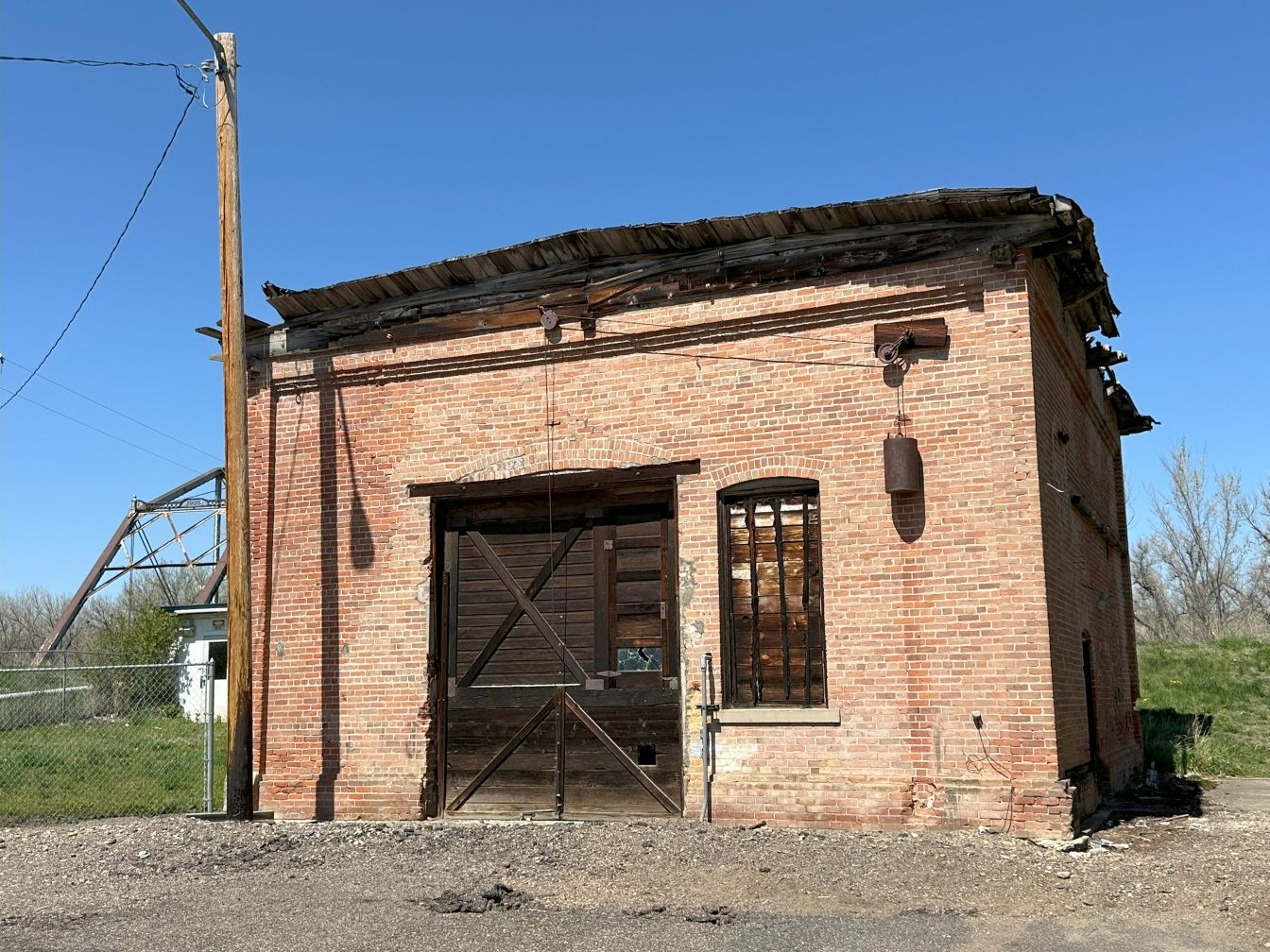
- The buildings in 2025

- Location within Montana
- Location: 3rd Ave. at the Yellowstone River, Forsyth, Montana
- Coordinates: 46°15′58″N 106°41′23″W
- Area: less than one acre
- Built: 1907-08
- Built by: Des Moines Bridge Building Co.
- Architectural style: Vernacular industrial
- MPS: Forsyth MPS
- NRHP reference No.: 90000087
- Added to NRHP: February 12, 1990

The Forsyth Water Pumping Station, on 3rd Ave. at the Yellowstone River in Forsyth, Montana, was built in 1907–1908. It was listed on the National Register of Historic Places in 1990.

It was built by the Des Moines Bridge Building Company as part of the first waterworks and sewer system in Forsyth, funded by a 1906 bond of $50,000. The pumphouse brought water up from the Yellowstone River to seepage areas where sediment settled out of the water. The water served the town until 1931 when a more sophisticated waterworks system was opened.

It was deemed "significant as the last surviving remnant of Forsyth's earliest publicly-financed public works project. In turn, the early water system of which this was a part was an important reason behind the incorporation of the community of Forsyth. Its presence served as both a reflection of evolving technology and community standards, and a strengthened community faith in the town's stability and future. The building's design, simple and solid, is a good example of largely unadorned early twentieth-century industrial architecture. Its brick construction, locally unusual, is an indication of the substantive nature of Forsyth's first waterworks project."
