= Klondike Hotel =

- U.S. National Register of Historic Places
- Location within Iowa Location within the United States
- Location: 332 3rd St. Manilla, Iowa
- Coordinates: 41°53′26″N 95°14′04″W
- Built: 1897
- Built by: H.J. Kopak
- Architectural style: Italianate
- NRHP reference No.: 96001060
- Added to NRHP: October 3, 1996

The Klondike Hotel, also known as the Park Hotel, is a historic building located in Manilla, Iowa, United States. The economic fortunes of Manilla rose and fell with the Chicago, Milwaukee, St. Paul and Pacific Railroad. The two-story, frame, Italianate style hotel was built by H.J. Kopak in 1897. F.M. Offineer was its first owner. The building features a hipped roof, bracketed eaves, and a full-length front porch. It was built a block away from the Milwaukee depot. It served both passengers and crews from trains that had an overnight layover in Manilla. In the early 20th-century Manilla became the junction on the Milwaukee's mainline across Iowa where trains continued on to Omaha or on to the Pacific extension through South Dakota and across the American West. The hotel's name was changed to the Park Hotel in 1903, and an addition was built onto the rear of the hotel in 1905. It went through a succession of owners, and its financial success was dependent on the business brought to it by the railroad. The hotel was listed on the National Register of Historic Places in 1996.
