= Charles Congden Carpenter =

American herpetologist and academic (1921–2016)

Charles Congden Carpenter (June 2, 1921 – January 10, 2016) was an eminent naturalist and herpetologist who has won numerous awards for excellence as an educator, researcher, and communicator.

== Education ==
Carpenter received a Bachelor of Arts degree in 1943 from Northern Michigan College of Education, now Northern Michigan University, in Marquette, Michigan. He took a U.S. Army Specialized Training Program at Tarleton State University in Stephenville, Texas, 1943-1944; at Stanford University in Palo Alto, California in 1944; and at Wayne University College of Medicine in Detroit, Michigan in 1945. He earned his Master of Science degree in zoology in 1947 and his Doctor of Philosophy degree in zoology in 1951 at the University of Michigan.

== Career ==
After receiving his Ph.D., Dr. Carpenter remained at Michigan in 1951-52 as an instructor in zoology. In 1953 he joined the faculty of the University of Oklahoma as assistant professor of zoology. In 1959 he was promoted to associate professor and he became a full professor in 1966. His title was Professor of Zoology at the University of Oklahoma and the Oklahoma Biological Station, and Curator of reptiles and amphibians at the Stovall Museum of Science and History. In 1987 he retired and became Professor Emeritus and Curator Emeritus.

At the University of Oklahoma, Dr. Carpenter taught, performed research in his areas of expertise, and directed the graduate work of 26 Doctor of Philosophy, 21 Master of Science, and 3 Master of Natural Science students. He has published 136 papers on subjects as diverse as: copulation in the fox snake, the common garter snake, time-motion studies of a lizard, turkey vulture migration in Veracruz, a combat ritual between two male speckled king snakes, and courtship, male combat and dominance in the western diamondback rattlesnake. He has given 214 special lectures and seminars, and made 32 appearances on radio and television. His field work has included teaching for 35 summers at the University of Oklahoma Biological Station on Lake Texoma, and 16 field expeditions.

== Honors ==
Dr. Carpenter has been an active member and an officer of a large number of organizations, including: American Institute of Biological Sciences, American Ornithologists Union, American Society of Ichthyologists and Herpetologists, American Society of Mammalogists, American Society of Zoologists (division secretary), Animal Behavior Society (secretary), Animal Research Council of the Oklahoma City Zoo (secretary and executive committee), Blue Cord Society (secretary and president), British Ecological Society, Charles Darwin Foundation for the Galapagos Islands, Ecological Society of America (section secretary), Grassland Research Foundation (secretary, treasurer, and board of directors), Herpetologist's League (president and executive council) Nature Conservancy, Oklahoma Academy of Science, Oklahoma Herpetological Society, Oklahoma Zoological Society, Oklahoma Wildlife Federation, Phi Kappa Phi, Phi Sigma, Societas Europaea Herpetologica, Society for the Study of Amphibians and Reptiles (editorial board), Southwestern Association of Naturalists (board of governors, secretary, and president), Society of Sigma Xi (OU chapter president), Wilderness Society, Wildlife Society; and Wilson Ornithological Society. The Charles C. Carpenter Library of Herpetology of the Sam Noble Oklahoma Museum of Natural History in Norman, Oklahoma and the Carpenter Classroom at the University of Oklahoma Biological Station are named in his honor.

Anolis carpenteri, a species of lizard, is named in his honor.

== Personal ==
Carpenter was born in Denison, Iowa on June 2, 1921. He is married to Mary Frances (née Pitynski) Carpenter, a member of the Oklahoma Medical Research Foundation and an adjunct professor of biochemistry at the University of Oklahoma Health Science Center in Oklahoma City. She is a member of the American Society of Biochemistry and Molecular Biology and the American Institute of Nutrition. Her research interests include: lipids, antioxidants, prostaglandin metabolism during differentiation, fatty acid metabolism, and microsomal hydroxylation.
