= Black River Bridge (Pocahontas, Arkansas) =

- Formerly listed on the U.S. National Register of Historic Places
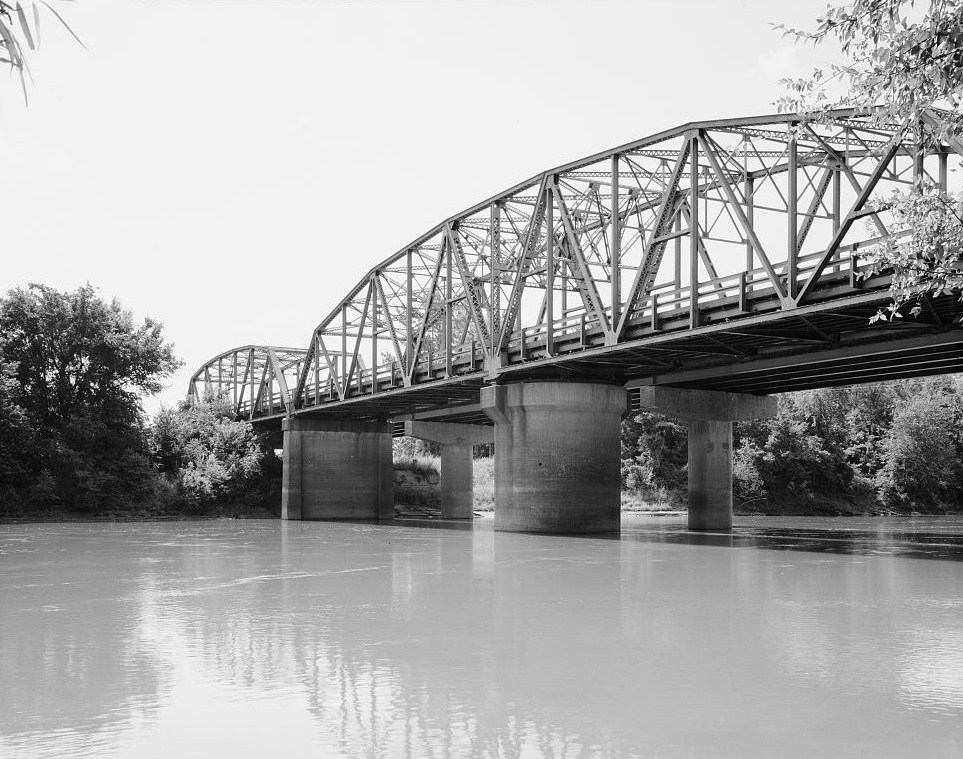
- HAER photo of the old bridge, 1988

- Location within Arkansas Location within the United States
- Location: Future I-57 / US 67 over the Black River, Pocahontas, Arkansas
- Coordinates: 36°15′16″N 90°58′15″W
- Area: less than one acre
- Built: 1934
- Built by: Pittsburgh-Des Moines Steel Co.; Arkansas Highway & Transportation
- Architectural style: Warren swing through-truss
- MPS: Historic Bridges of Arkansas MPS
- NRHP reference No.: 90000522

Significant dates
- Added to NRHP: April 9, 1990
- Removed from NRHP: January 26, 2018

The Black River Bridge carries U.S. Route 67 (US 67) (Future Interstate 57 (I-57)) across the Black River in Pocahontas, Arkansas. The bridge is a twin span, each carrying two lanes of traffic. The northern bridge was a historic structure, built in 1934 by the Pittsburgh-Des Moines Steel Co., and was listed on the National Register of Historic Places. In 2016 demolition began on the northern bridge, and it was delisted in 2018. This bridge consisted of two Parker trusses, one on either side of a Warren swing span, and trestled approaches, giving it a total length of 1,255 feet (383 m). It was one of three surviving swing bridges in the state. The southern bridge is a modern steel girder structure, built in 1986, whose construction rendered the swing section inoperative.

== See also ==
- List of bridges documented by the Historic American Engineering Record in Arkansas
- List of bridges on the National Register of Historic Places in Arkansas
- National Register of Historic Places listings in Randolph County, Arkansas
