= Neillsville Standpipe =

- U.S. National Register of Historic Places
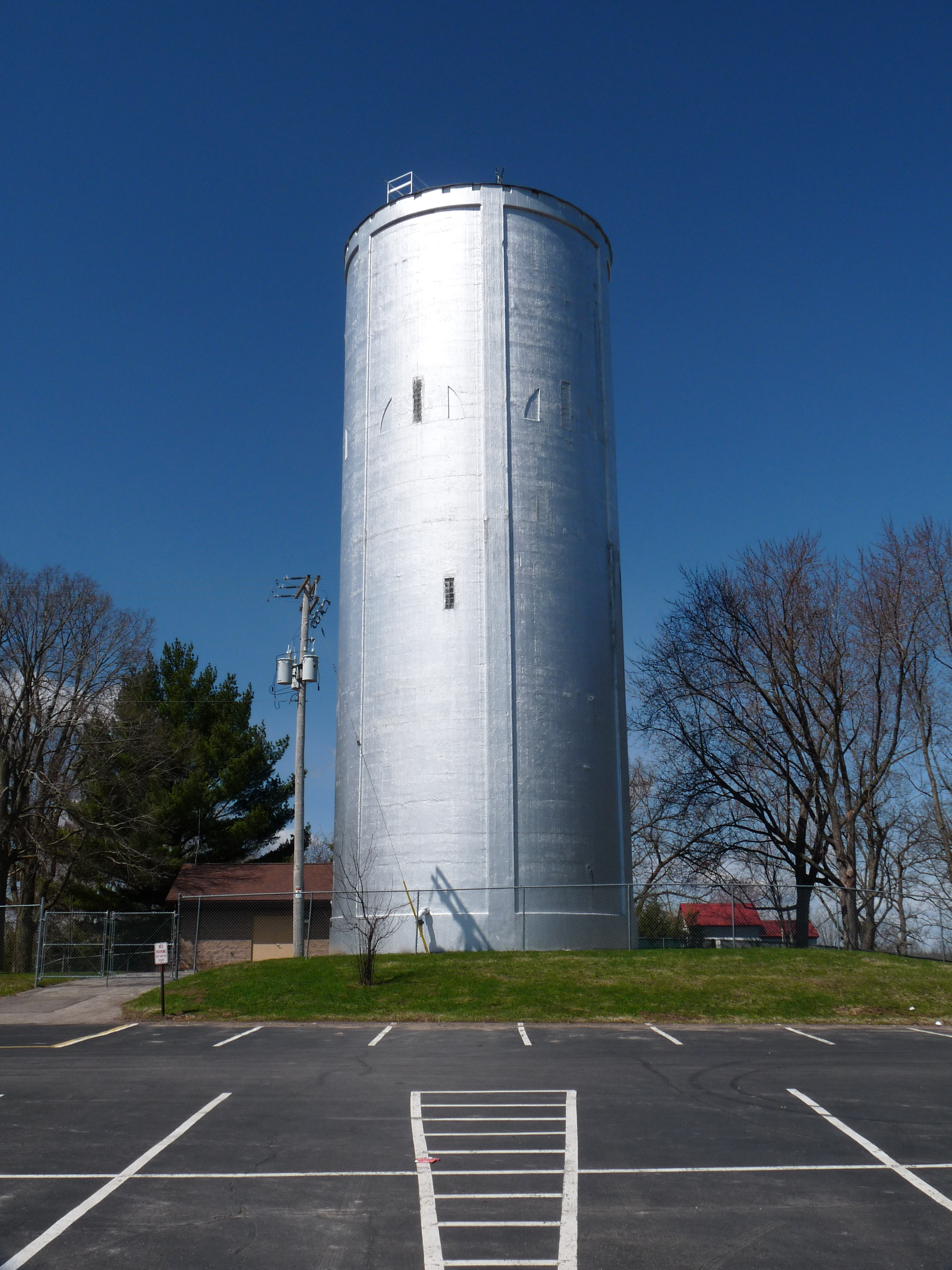
- Neillsville Standpipe
- Location: 325 E. 4th St. Neillsville, Wisconsin
- Coordinates: 44.55921°N 90.59112°W
- Built: 1926
- Architect: Tierweiller Brothers/Pittsburgh-Des Moines Steel Co.
- NRHP reference No.: 13000711
- Added to NRHP: September 9, 2013

The Neillsville Standpipe is located in Neillsville, Wisconsin.

== History ==
The standpipe is located at the highest point in Neillsville and consists of a steel water tank made by the Pittsburgh-Des Moines Steel Co. encased in a 95-foot (29 m) slip-form concrete tower built by Tierweiler Bros. of Marshfield. It was added to the State Register of Historic Places in 2012 and to the National Register of Historic Places the following year.
