= De Valls Bluff Waterworks =

- U.S. National Register of Historic Places
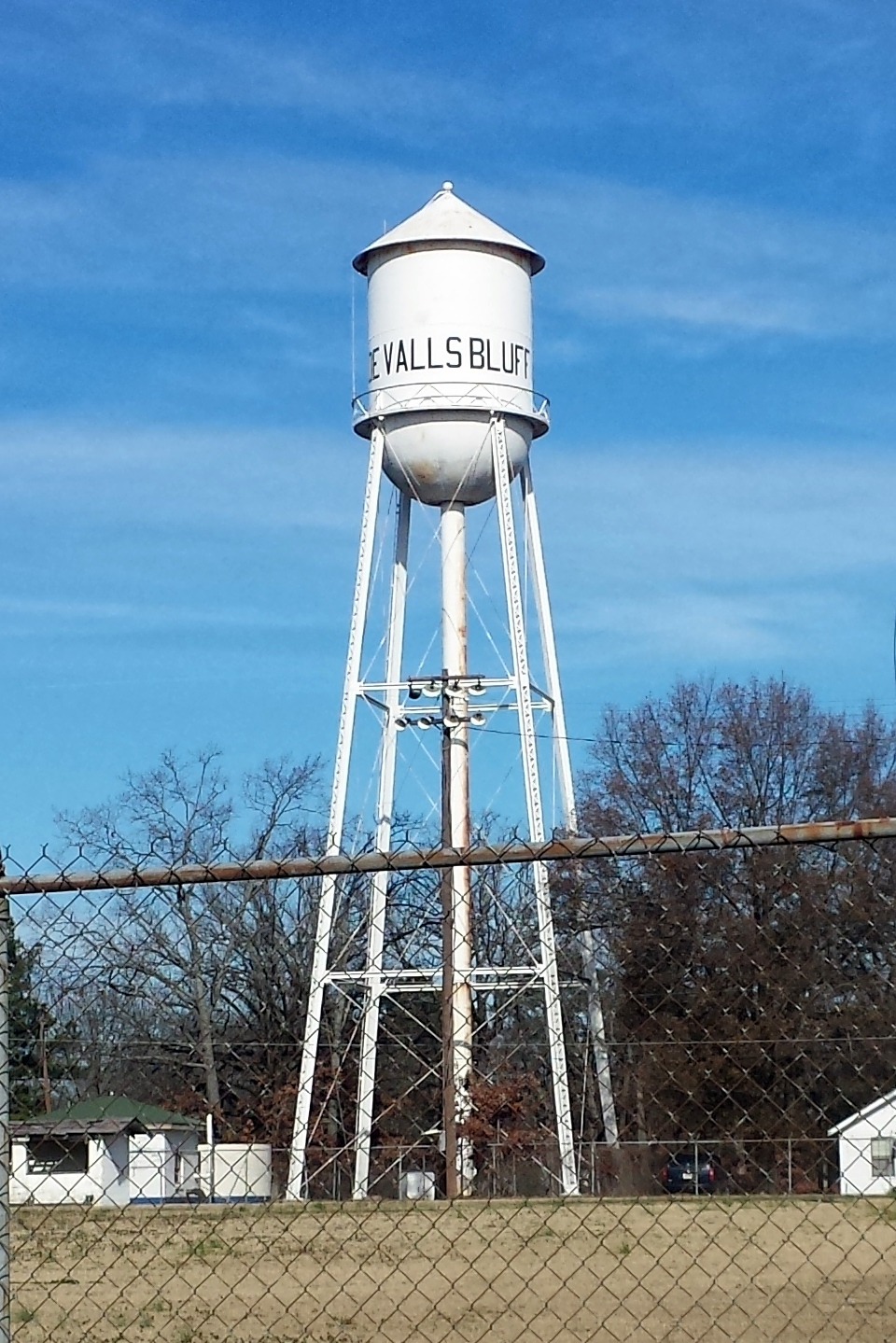

- Location within Arkansas Location within the United States
- Location: Jct. of Hazel and Rumbaugh Streets, De Valls Bluff, Arkansas
- Coordinates: 34°46′58″N 91°27′47″W
- Area: less than one acre
- Built: 1936
- Built by: Pittsburgh-Des Moines Steel Company and Public Works Administration
- Architectural style: Plain/Traditional
- MPS: New Deal Recovery Efforts in Arkansas MPS
- NRHP reference No.: 07000969
- Added to NRHP: September 20, 2007

The De Valls Bluff Waterworks is a historic public water supply facility at Rumbaugh and Hazel Streets in De Valls Bluff, Arkansas. It contains a 1930s-era elevated steel water tower, which was built in 1936 by the Pittsburgh-Des Moines Steel Company in conjunction with the Public Works Administration as part of a project to improve the local water supply. It was added to the National Register of Historic Places in 2007, as part of a multiple-property listing that included numerous other New Deal-era projects throughout Arkansas. The property also contains several non-contributing buildings, including a shed, aeration chamber, and water tank.

== See also ==
- Cotter water tower
- Cotton Plant water tower
- Hampton Waterworks
- Hartford Water Tower
- McCrory Waterworks
- Mineral Springs Waterworks
- National Register of Historic Places listings in Prairie County, Arkansas
