= Arthur C. Greene =

American politician (1881–1958)

Member of the Iowa House of Representatives from the Crawford County district
- In office January 9, 1939 – January 7, 1945

Personal details
- Born: January 22, 1881 Denison, Iowa
- Died: June 10, 1958 (aged 77)
- Party: Republican

Arthur C. Greene (January 22, 1881 – June 10, 1958) was an American politician and businessman. He served three consecutive terms in the Iowa House of Representatives.

== Early life ==
Greene was born in Denison, Iowa on January 22, 1958. He was educated in Denison schools and graduated from Denison Normal and Business College.

== Career ==
Greene went to work in his father's brickyard business, and was later a partner. He served six years as an alderman in Denison. He then served as Night Marshall (policeman) for six years. He was elected County Sheriff in 1919, serving in the office for eighteen years through January 1, 1939.

He was elected to the Iowa House of Representatives from Crawford County as a Republican, where he served three consecutive terms. Greene was Chair of the Fish and Game Committee, and a member of the Judiciary Committee, Agricultural Committee, Social Security Committee, Conservation Committee, Mines and Mining Committee, and National Defense Committee.

In retirement, Greene served with the Iowa State Patrol in Dennison.

== Personal life ==
Greene married in Zella M. Hover on November 18, 1903, in Denison. The couple had five children: Marion, Lois, Leonard, Clarion, and Pershing. Greene was a member of the Iowa Knights of Pythias, the Iowa Improved Order of Red Men, and a member of the Methodist church.

Greene died on June 10, 1958 at the age of 77.
