= McCrory Waterworks =

- U.S. National Register of Historic Places
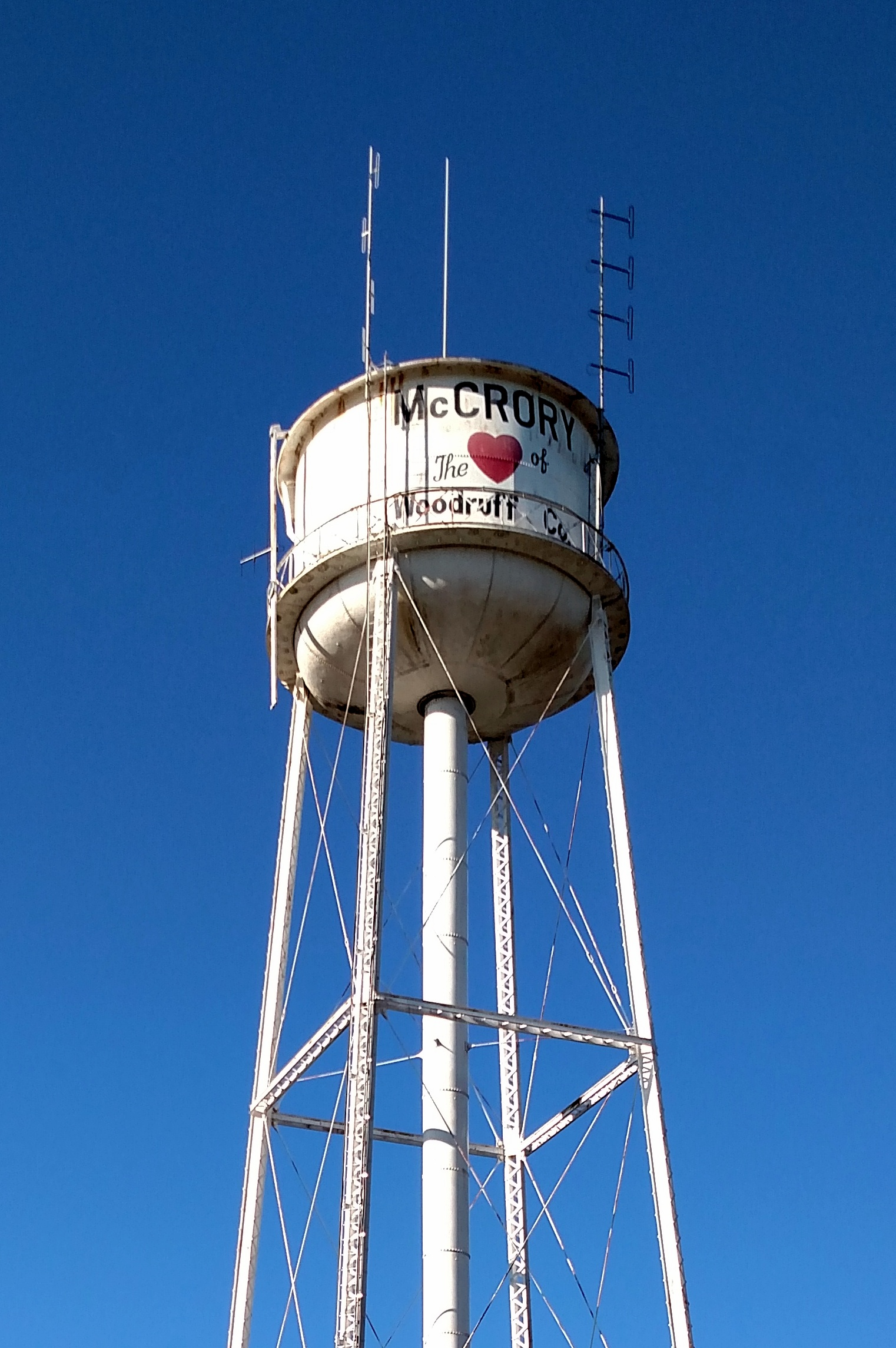

- Location within Arkansas Location within the United States
- Location: Jct. of N. Fakes and W. Third, McCrory, Arkansas
- Coordinates: 35°15′28″N 91°12′2″W
- Area: less than one acre
- Built: 1935
- Built by: Chicago Bridge & Iron Works
- Architectural style: Plain/Traditional
- MPS: New Deal Recovery Efforts in Arkansas MPS
- NRHP reference No.: 07000968
- Added to NRHP: September 20, 2007

The McCrory Waterworks is a historic site located in McCrory, Arkansas. It contains an elevated steel water tower, built in 1936 by the Chicago Bridge & Iron Company in conjunction with the Public Works Administration, which provided $39,497 in aid for the construction of the waterworks, which included the water tower, tank, and water shed. The site was added to the National Register of Historic Places in 2007, as part of a multiple-property listing that included numerous other New Deal-era projects throughout Arkansas.

== See also ==
- Cotter Water Tower
- Cotton Plant Water Tower
- Hampton Waterworks
- Hartford Water Tower
- De Valls Bluff Waterworks
- National Register of Historic Places listings in Woodruff County, Arkansas
