= Z.T. Dunham Pioneer Stock Farm =

- U.S. National Register of Historic Places
- Location within Iowa Location within the United States
- Location: Iowa Highway 37, 1 mile northwest of Dunlap
- Coordinates: 41°52′03″N 95°37′09″W
- Area: less than one acre
- Built: 1870
- NRHP reference No.: 93000652
- Added to NRHP: August 2, 1993

The Z.T. Dunham Pioneer Stock Farm, also known as the Dunham Horse Barn, is a historic barn located northwest of Dunlap, Iowa, United States. The 40-by-44-foot (12 by 13 m) brick structure with a gable roof was built by Z.T. Dunham and his brother Sam. The brothers were partners in a farming operation left to them in their father's estate. Their father, Cornelius Dunham, had been one of the original settlers in Crawford County, Iowa in 1849. At the same time the barn was built a house for their mother was also constructed. A country road now separates the house and the barn. The two brothers went their own way in the mid 1870s, and Z.T. Dunham continued to operate the farm where he specialized in raising Shorthorn cattle and Poland China hogs. The barn represents the period of large scale beef production, and its importance to the local economy. The barn was listed on the National Register of Historic Places in 1993. The farm remains in the Dunham family.
