= Nishnabotna River Bridge (310th Street) =

- U.S. National Register of Historic Places
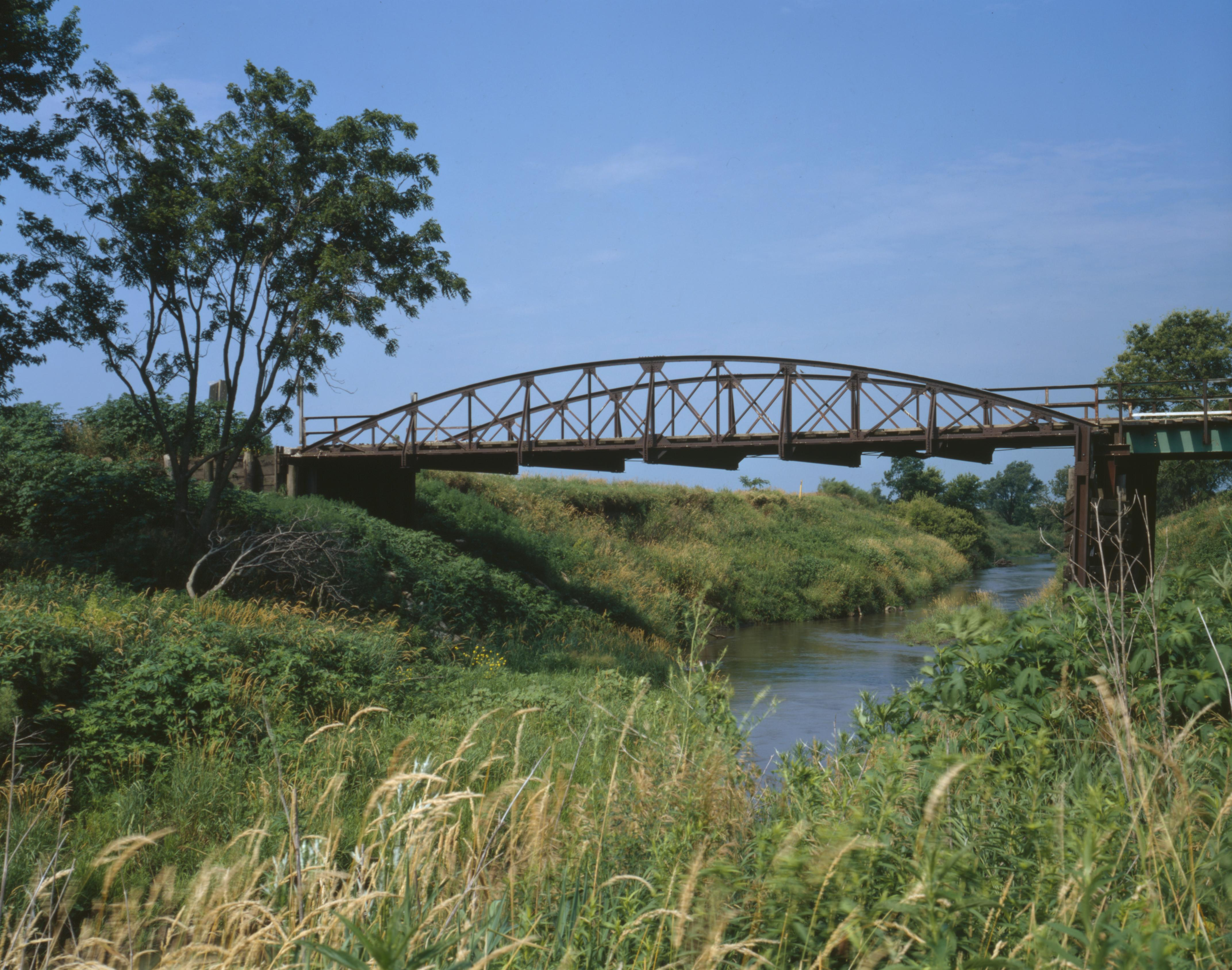

- Location within Iowa Location within the United States
- Location: 310th Street over the Nishnabotna River
- Nearest city: Manilla, Iowa
- Coordinates: 41°52′0″N 95°16′0″W
- Area: less than one acre
- Built: 1945
- Architect: H. Gene McKeown & Assoc.
- Architectural style: Bowstring truss
- MPS: Highway Bridges of Iowa MPS
- NRHP reference No.: 99000309
- Added to NRHP: March 12, 1999

The Nishnabotna River Bridge is located southwest of Manilla, Iowa, United States. It carries traffic on 310th Street over the Nishnabotna River. Steel was in short supply during World War II as a part of the war effort. Many bridges built across the state were built in this era with timber, especially small-scale bridges. Heavy flooding washed out 27 bridges and culverts in Crawford County in May 1945. The county board of supervisors used emergency funds to build new bridges. They bought several steel superstructures from the Des Moines Steel Company to replace the wash-out spans. The bowstring arch-truss structures appear to have been designed by H. Gene McKeown, a civil engineer from Council Bluffs. This bridge is one several similar structures built in the county, and one of five that still remain. The bridge was listed on the National Register of Historic Places in 1999.

== See also ==
- List of bridges documented by the Historic American Engineering Record in Iowa
