= Park Motel =

- U.S. National Register of Historic Places
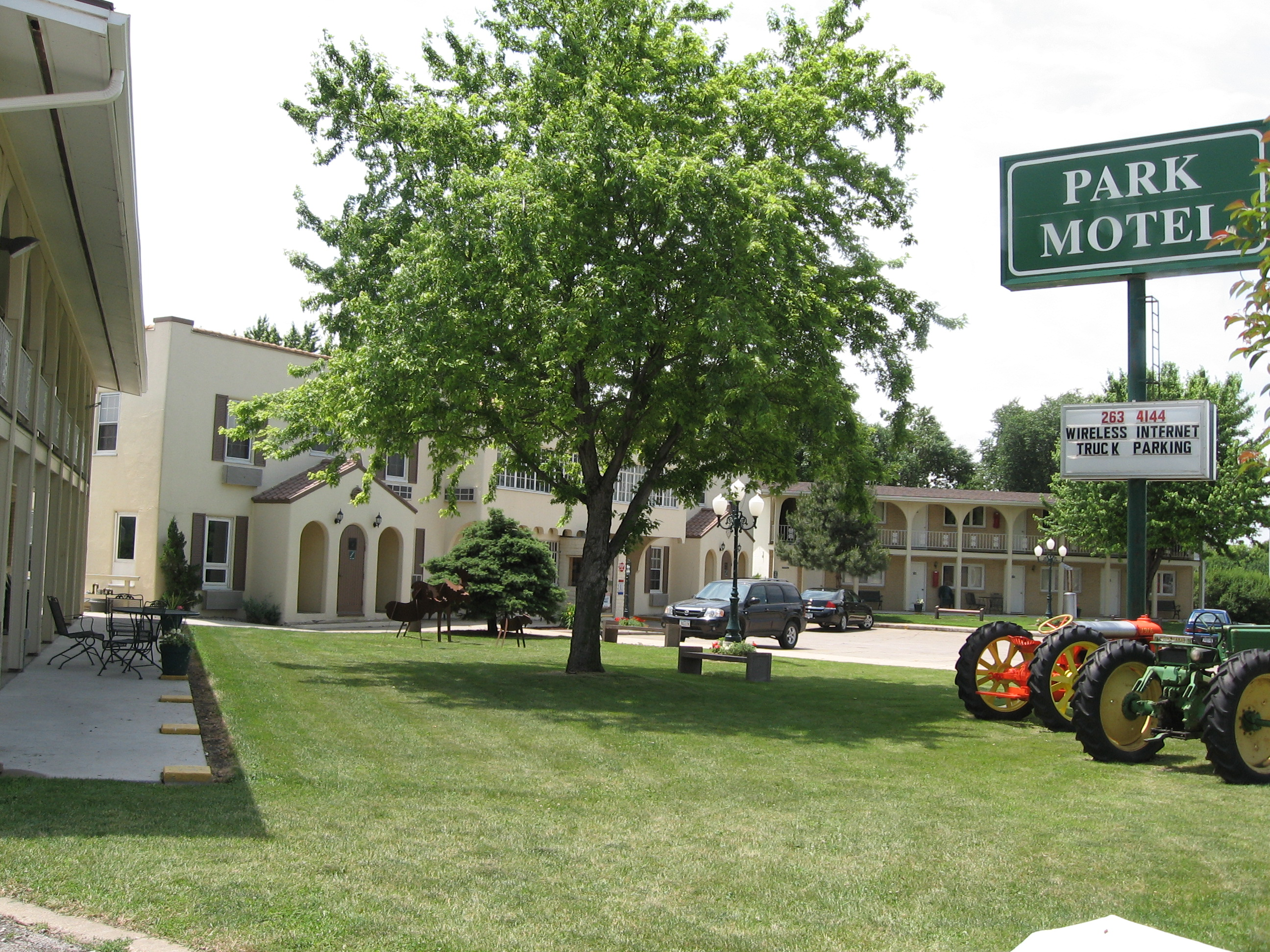

- Location within Iowa Location within the United States
- Location: 803 4th Ave. S. Denison, Iowa
- Coordinates: 42°0′43″N 95°21′45″W
- Built: 1940
- Architect: Charles Chrestensen
- Architectural style: Spanish Colonial Revival
- NRHP reference No.: 00000565
- Added to NRHP: June 2, 2000

The Park Motel is a historic building located in Denison, Iowa, United States. It is an example of a well-preserved highway motel during the early age of motoring. It appears this is also an early example of a motel in Iowa and may be one of the earliest in the Midwest.

The motel was built by Ted Port in 1940, and it included 24 units on two floors. Two of the units had a kitchenette, and there were living quarters for the motel clerk behind the lobby. The idea for the Spanish Colonial Revival design came from the Pan-American Courts in San Antonio, Texas, an establishment that Port had visited. Charles Chrestensen, a local contractor, drew up plans for the motel based on an illustration of the Texas motel. While it is not an exact copy, it follows the design quite closely. The Park Motel was built across U.S. Highway 30 from a cafe and a service station. While not the traditional one-stop facility owned by a single owner on the same property, the cafe and the motel were marketed together. Port built all three buildings, but he no longer owned the service station or the cafe when the motel was built.

Port sold the property in 1945, but it has remained in operation as a motel. Two wings flank the original structure at an angle, and were built in 1965. The motel was listed on the National Register of Historic Places in 2000, although the 1965 wings are not part of the historic designation.

Notable guests include Denison-native Donna Reed, Elizabeth Dole, Ethel Kennedy, and Iowa governor Terry Branstad.

== See also ==
- List of motels
