= Clarence D. Chamberlin House =

Historic house in Iowa, United States

- U.S. National Register of Historic Places
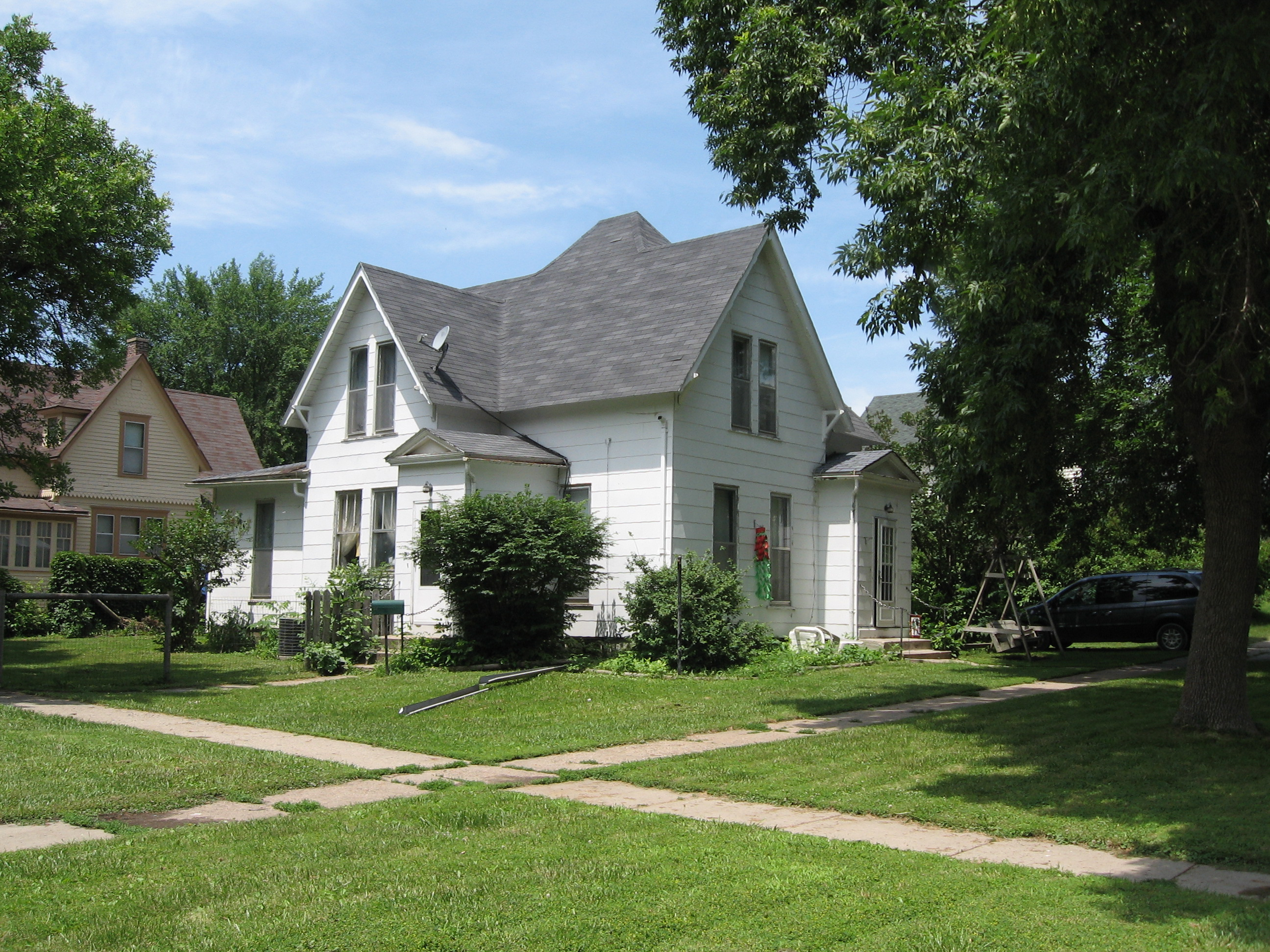

- Location within Iowa Location within the United States
- Location: 1434 2nd Ave., S. Denison, Iowa
- Coordinates: 42°0′53″N 95°21′7″W
- Area: 0.13 acres (0.053 ha)
- Built: c. 1897
- NRHP reference No.: 77000505
- Added to NRHP: April 28, 1977

The Clarence D. Chamberlin House is a historic house located at 1434 Second Avenue South in Denison, Iowa.

== Description and history ==
It is most significant as the boyhood home of Clarence D. Chamberlin, the pilot of the first trans-Atlantic passenger flight, June 4, 1927. The two-story frame house was built in the late 1890s. Chamberlin lived here until 1914, when he left Denison to attend Iowa State College.

The house was listed on the National Register of Historic Places on April 28, 1977.
