= Carey House (Denison, Iowa) =

Historic house in Iowa, United States

- John T. and Marietta (Greek) Carey House
- U.S. National Register of Historic Places
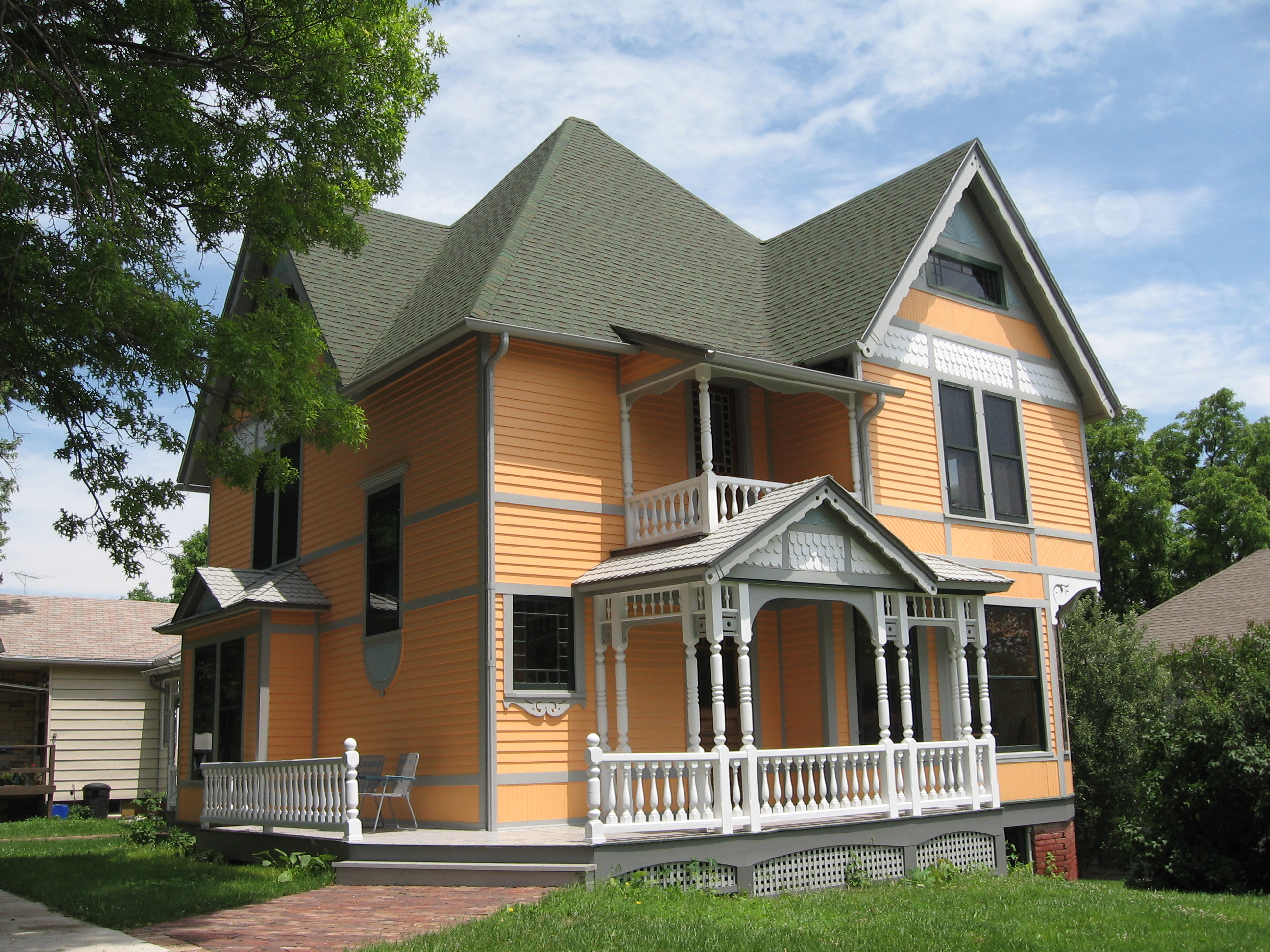

- Location within Iowa Location within the United States
- Location: 1502 1st Ave. N Denison, Iowa
- Coordinates: 42°1′3″N 95°21′6″W
- Built: 1893
- Architect: George F. Barber & Co.
- Architectural style: Queen-Anne
- NRHP reference No.: 05000276
- Added to NRHP: April 11, 2005

The John T. and Marietta Carey House is a historic residence located in Denison, Iowa, United States. The house is associated with John Carey, who served for six years as Denison's mayor. During that time the city's sewer system was put in, street signs were put up, preparations were made for mail delivery, the Carnegie Library and the courthouse were built, a telephone exchange was installed and the city more than doubled in size. President Theodore Roosevelt and Treasury Secretary L. M. Shaw, a former Iowa governor, visited Denison when Carey was mayor. He also served in county government. Marietta (Greek) Carey was the daughter of early pioneers to the county, and she was one of the first people born in the county. The two-story, frame, Queen-Anne style house was built in 1893. It is a mail-order house from the George F. Barber & Co. in Knoxville, Tennessee. The house was listed on the National Register of Historic Places in 2000.
