= East Soldier River Bridge =

- Formerly listed on the U.S. National Register of Historic Places
- Location within Iowa Location within the United States
- Location: 120th St. over the East Soldier River
- Nearest city: Charter Oak, Iowa
- Coordinates: 42°03′28″N 95°38′01″W
- Area: less than one acre
- Built: 1945
- Architect: H. Gene McKeown & Assoc.
- Architectural style: Bowstring truss
- MPS: Highway Bridges of Iowa MPS
- NRHP reference No.: 98000798

Significant dates
- Added to NRHP: June 25, 1998
- Removed from NRHP: July 31, 2020

The East Soldier River Bridge was located southwest of Charter Oak, Iowa, United States. It carried traffic on 120th Street over the East Soldier River. Steel was in short supply during World War II as a part of the war effort. Many bridges built across the state were built in this era with timber, especially small-scale bridges. Heavy flooding washed out 27 bridges and culverts in Crawford County in May 1945. The county board of supervisors used emergency funds to build new bridges. They bought several steel superstructures from the Des Moines Steel Company to replace the wash-out spans. The bowstring arch-truss structures appear to have been designed by H. Gene McKeown, a civil engineer from Council Bluffs. This bridge is one of several similar structures built in the county. The bridge was listed on the National Register of Historic Places in 1998, and it was delisted in 2020.
