= William A. McHenry House =

Historic house in Iowa, United States

- U.S. National Register of Historic Places
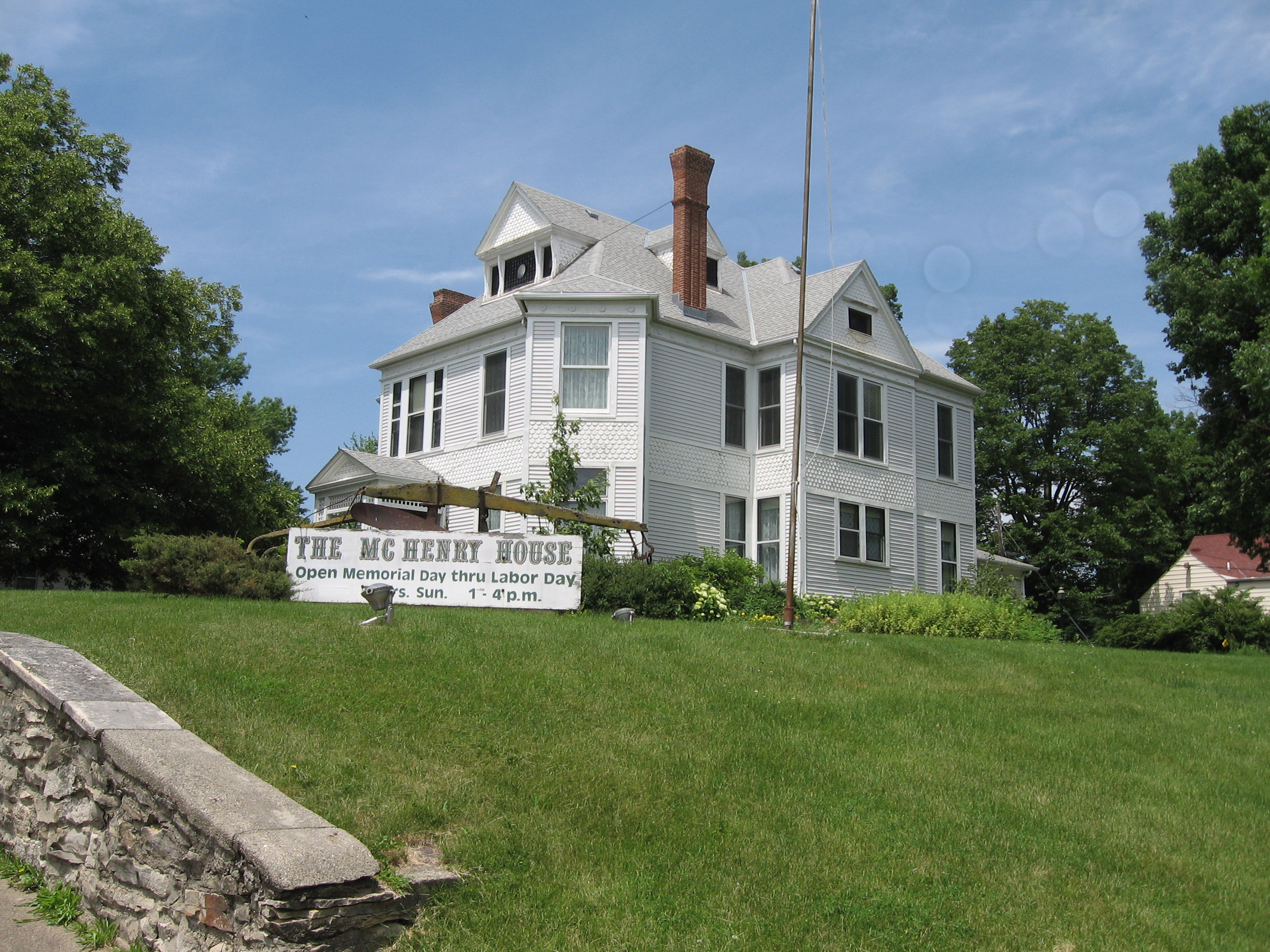

- Location within Iowa Location within the United States
- Location: 1428 1st Ave., N. Denison, Iowa
- Coordinates: 42°1′5″N 95°21′7″W
- Built: 1886
- Architect: McHenry, William A.; Sewell, L.P.
- Architectural style: Late Victorian, Shingle Style
- NRHP reference No.: 76000755
- Added to NRHP: November 07, 1976

The William A. McHenry House, Denison, Iowa, is on the National Register of Historic Places. It is maintained as a museum by the Crawford County Historical Society and is open for tours.

The Oscar of Donna Reed who was from Denison, and won the Academy Award for Best Supporting Actress in 1953 is on display at William A. McHenry House.
