= Buck Grove Bridge =

- U.S. National Register of Historic Places
- Location within Iowa Location within the United States
- Location: Buck Creek Ave. over Buck Creek
- Nearest city: Buck Grove, Iowa
- Coordinates: 41°54′50″N 95°22′49″W
- Area: less than one acre
- Built: 1945
- Architect: H. Gene McKeown & Assoc.
- Architectural style: Bowstring truss
- MPS: Highway Bridges of Iowa MPS
- NRHP reference No.: 98000797
- Added to NRHP: June 25, 1998

The Buck Grove Bridge is located southeast of Buck Grove, Iowa, United States. It spans Buck Creek for 70 feet (21 m). Steel was in short supply during World War II as a part of the war effort. Many bridges built across the state were built in this era with timber, especially small-scale bridges. Heavy flooding washed out 27 bridges and culverts in Crawford County in May 1945. The county board of supervisors used emergency funds to build new bridges. They bought several steel superstructures from the Des Moines Steel Company to replace the wash-out spans. The bowstring arch-truss structures appear to have been designed by H. Gene McKeown, a civil engineer from Council Bluffs. This bridge is one of several similar structures built in the county, and one of five that still remain. The bridge was listed on the National Register of Historic Places in 1998.
