= Beaver Creek Bridge (Schleswig, Iowa) =

- Formerly listed on the U.S. National Register of Historic Places
- Location within Iowa Location within the United States
- Location: 180th St. between B and C Aves. over Beaver Creek
- Nearest city: Schleswig, Iowa
- Coordinates: 42°11′42″N 95°31′02″W
- Area: less than one acre
- Built: 1946
- Architect: H. Gene McKeown & Assoc.
- Architectural style: Bowstring truss
- MPS: Highway Bridges of Iowa MPS
- NRHP reference No.: 98000799

Significant dates
- Added to NRHP: June 25, 1998
- Removed from NRHP: July 31, 2020

The Beaver Creek Bridge was located northwest of Schleswig, Iowa, United States. It spanned Beaver Creek for 134 feet (41 m). Steel was in short supply during World War II as a part of the war effort. Many bridges built across the state were built in this era with timber, especially small-scale bridges. Heavy flooding washed out 27 bridges and culverts in Crawford County in May 1945. The county board of supervisors used emergency funds to build new bridges. They bought several steel superstructures from the Des Moines Steel Company to replace the wash-out spans. The bowstring arch-truss structures appear to have been designed by H. Gene McKeown, a civil engineer from Council Bluffs. This bridge was one of several similar structures built in the county. The bridge was listed on the National Register of Historic Places in 1998, and it was delisted in 2020.
