= Denison, Iowa =

- City
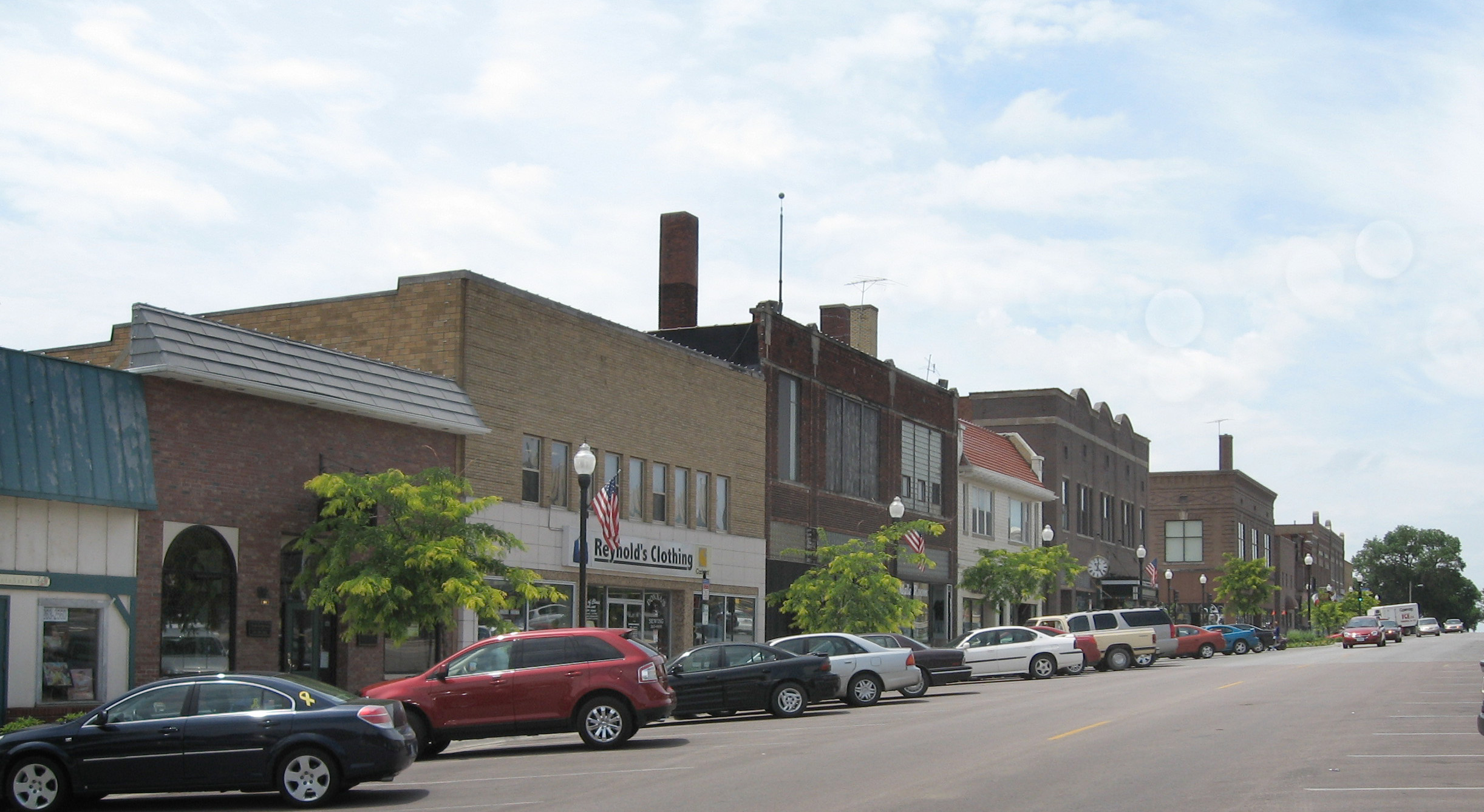
- Downtown Denison

- Location of Denison, Iowa
- Coordinates: 42°00′58″N 95°21′10″W
- Country: United States
- State: Iowa
- County: Crawford

Government
  - Mayor: Pam Soseman

Area
  - Total: 6.58 sq mi (17.03 km^{2})
  - Land: 6.55 sq mi (16.96 km^{2})
  - Water: 0.027 sq mi (0.07 km^{2})
- Elevation: 1,257 ft (383 m)

Population (2020)
  - Total: 8,373
  - Density: 1,279/sq mi (493.8/km^{2})
- Time zone: UTC-6 (Central (CST))
  - Summer (DST): UTC-5 (CDT)
- ZIP code: 51442
- Area code: 712
- FIPS code: 19-19945
- GNIS feature ID: 2394514
- Website: www.denisonia.com

Denison is a city in Crawford County, Iowa, United States, along the Boyer River, and located in both Denison Township and East Boyer Township. The population was 8,373 at the time of the 2020 census. It is the county seat of Crawford County.

== History ==
Denison was laid out in 1856; the town was incorporated in 1875. Denison was named for its founder, J. W. Denison.

== Geography ==
According to the United States Census Bureau, the city has a total area of 6.57 square miles (17.02 km^{2}), of which, 6.54 square miles (16.94 km^{2}) is land and 0.03 square miles (0.08 km^{2}) is water.

=== Climate ===
According to the Köppen Climate Classification system, Denison has a hot-summer humid continental climate, abbreviated "Dfa" on climate maps.

Climate data for Denison, Iowa, 1991–2020 normals, extremes 1893–present
| Month | Jan | Feb | Mar | Apr | May | Jun | Jul | Aug | Sep | Oct | Nov | Dec | Year |
|---|---|---|---|---|---|---|---|---|---|---|---|---|---|
| Record high °F (°C) | 68 (20) | 70 (21) | 88 (31) | 93 (34) | 105 (41) | 109 (43) | 112 (44) | 111 (44) | 103 (39) | 92 (33) | 80 (27) | 70 (21) | 112 (44) |
| Mean maximum °F (°C) | 50.4 (10.2) | 56.4 (13.6) | 72.4 (22.4) | 83.1 (28.4) | 88.5 (31.4) | 91.9 (33.3) | 93.4 (34.1) | 92.4 (33.6) | 89.3 (31.8) | 82.9 (28.3) | 68.1 (20.1) | 53.6 (12.0) | 95.4 (35.2) |
| Mean daily maximum °F (°C) | 27.4 (−2.6) | 32.1 (0.1) | 45.3 (7.4) | 58.4 (14.7) | 69.5 (20.8) | 79.7 (26.5) | 83.1 (28.4) | 81.0 (27.2) | 74.8 (23.8) | 61.5 (16.4) | 45.5 (7.5) | 32.4 (0.2) | 57.6 (14.2) |
| Daily mean °F (°C) | 18.6 (−7.4) | 22.9 (−5.1) | 35.1 (1.7) | 47.0 (8.3) | 59.0 (15.0) | 69.4 (20.8) | 73.1 (22.8) | 70.8 (21.6) | 63.2 (17.3) | 50.4 (10.2) | 35.8 (2.1) | 24.1 (−4.4) | 47.4 (8.6) |
| Mean daily minimum °F (°C) | 9.8 (−12.3) | 13.7 (−10.2) | 24.8 (−4.0) | 35.6 (2.0) | 48.5 (9.2) | 59.2 (15.1) | 63.0 (17.2) | 60.6 (15.9) | 51.7 (10.9) | 39.3 (4.1) | 26.1 (−3.3) | 15.9 (−8.9) | 37.4 (3.0) |
| Mean minimum °F (°C) | −11.5 (−24.2) | −6.3 (−21.3) | 4.8 (−15.1) | 21.1 (−6.1) | 35.2 (1.8) | 47.6 (8.7) | 52.7 (11.5) | 51.0 (10.6) | 36.9 (2.7) | 23.8 (−4.6) | 9.9 (−12.3) | −4.7 (−20.4) | −14.6 (−25.9) |
| Record low °F (°C) | −40 (−40) | −37 (−38) | −23 (−31) | 5 (−15) | 17 (−8) | 31 (−1) | 39 (4) | 24 (−4) | 18 (−8) | −1 (−18) | −16 (−27) | −26 (−32) | −40 (−40) |
| Average precipitation inches (mm) | 0.74 (19) | 0.98 (25) | 1.88 (48) | 3.38 (86) | 4.62 (117) | 4.92 (125) | 4.13 (105) | 4.43 (113) | 3.27 (83) | 2.64 (67) | 1.45 (37) | 1.20 (30) | 33.64 (855) |
| Average snowfall inches (cm) | 8.1 (21) | 9.2 (23) | 4.7 (12) | 1.6 (4.1) | 0.1 (0.25) | 0.0 (0.0) | 0.0 (0.0) | 0.0 (0.0) | 0.0 (0.0) | 0.5 (1.3) | 2.4 (6.1) | 7.9 (20) | 34.5 (87.75) |
| Average precipitation days (≥ 0.01 in) | 5.9 | 6.6 | 7.8 | 10.3 | 12.7 | 11.4 | 9.9 | 9.9 | 8.3 | 8.2 | 5.7 | 6.2 | 102.9 |
| Average snowy days (≥ 0.1 in) | 4.1 | 4.8 | 2.4 | 1.0 | 0.1 | 0.0 | 0.0 | 0.0 | 0.0 | 0.4 | 1.8 | 3.9 | 18.5 |
Source 1: NOAA
Source 2: National Weather Service

== Demographics ==
Historical population
| Year | Pop. | ±% |
|---|---|---|
| 1870 | 326 | — |
| 1880 | 1,441 | +342.0% |
| 1890 | 1,782 | +23.7% |
| 1900 | 2,771 | +55.5% |
| 1910 | 3,133 | +13.1% |
| 1920 | 3,581 | +14.3% |
| 1930 | 3,905 | +9.0% |
| 1940 | 4,361 | +11.7% |
| 1950 | 4,554 | +4.4% |
| 1960 | 4,930 | +8.3% |
| 1970 | 6,218 | +26.1% |
| 1980 | 6,675 | +7.3% |
| 1990 | 6,604 | −1.1% |
| 2000 | 7,339 | +11.1% |
| 2010 | 8,298 | +13.1% |
| 2020 | 8,373 | +0.9% |
Source: "U.S. Census website". United States Census Bureau. Source: U.S. Decennial Census

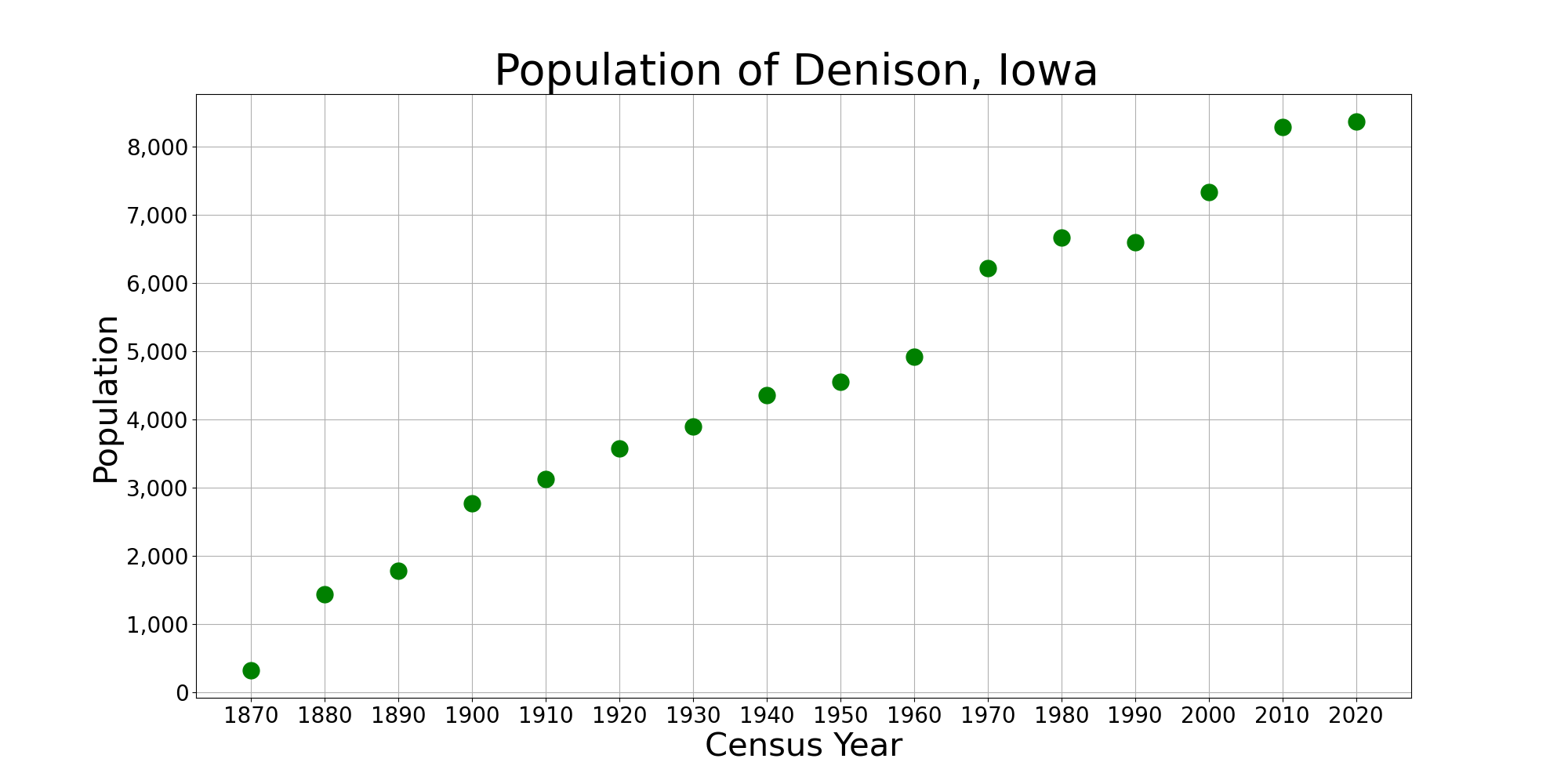
The population of Denison, Iowa from US census data

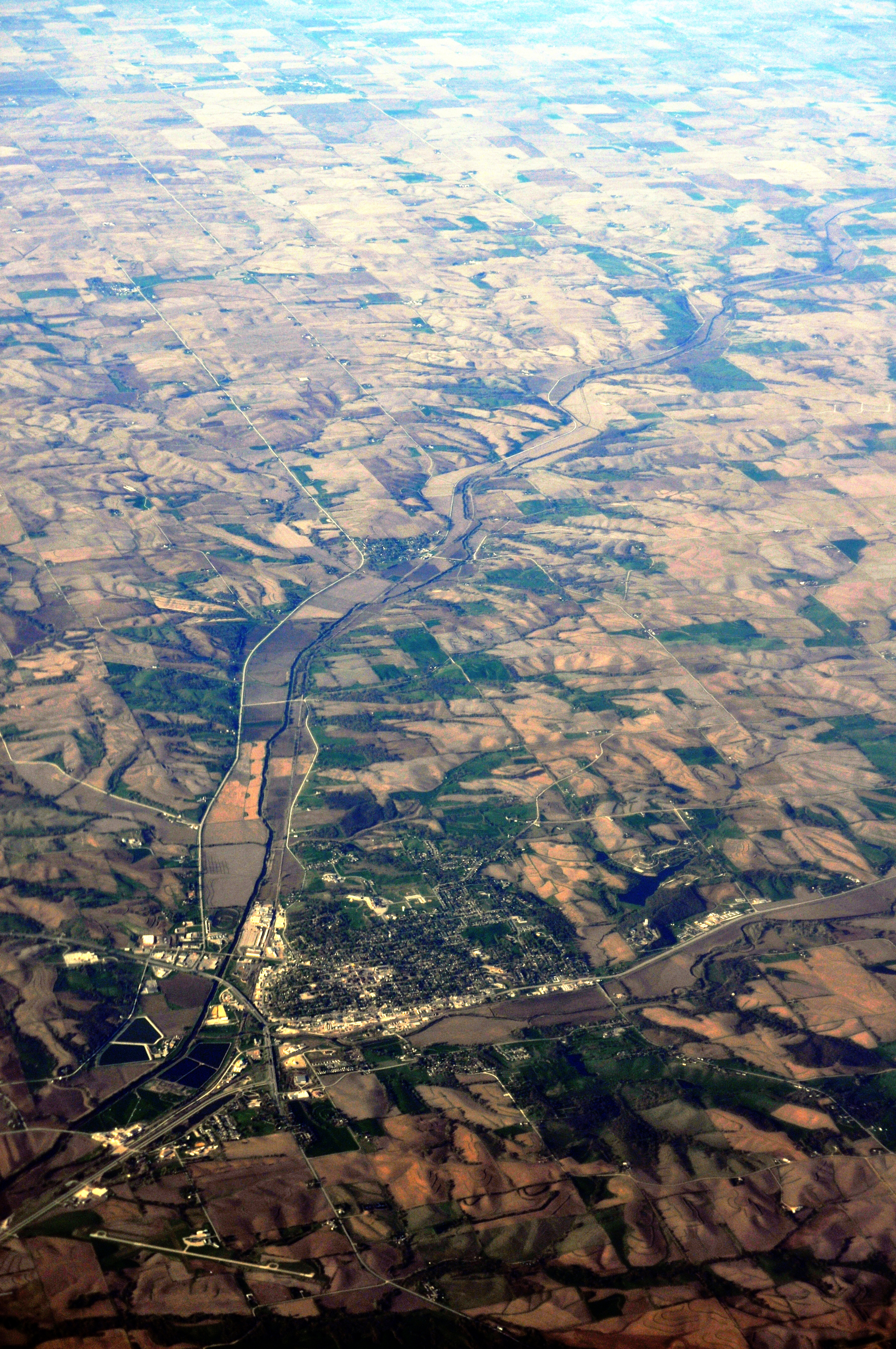
Aerial view of Denison from the southwest, 2012

=== 2020 census ===
As of the 2020 census, there were 8,373 people, 2,853 households, and 1,882 families residing in the city. The population density was 1,278.9 inhabitants per square mile (493.8/km^{2}). There were 3,089 housing units at an average density of 471.8 per square mile (182.2/km^{2}), of which 7.6% were vacant. The homeowner vacancy rate was 1.4% and the rental vacancy rate was 8.8%.

Of the 2,853 households, 39.2% had children under the age of 18 living with them, 46.0% were married-couple households, 6.8% were cohabitating couples, 27.3% had a female householder with no spouse or partner present, and 19.9% had a male householder with no spouse or partner present. Non-family households made up 34.0% of all households. Individuals made up 29.7% of all households, and 16.2% had someone living alone who was 65 years of age or older.

The median age was 32.1 years. 30.2% of residents were under the age of 18 and 14.6% were 65 years of age or older. By broader age cohorts, 34.2% of residents were under the age of 20, 7.1% were between the ages of 20 and 24, 23.0% were from 25 to 44, and 21.1% were from 45 to 64. The gender makeup of the city was 49.7% male and 50.3% female. For every 100 females, there were 98.6 males, and for every 100 females age 18 and over, there were 99.2 males age 18 and over.

96.9% of residents lived in urban areas, while 3.1% lived in rural areas.

Racial composition as of the 2020 census
| Race | Number | Percent |
|---|---|---|
| White | 3,988 | 47.6% |
| Black or African American | 348 | 4.2% |
| American Indian and Alaska Native | 142 | 1.7% |
| Asian | 272 | 3.2% |
| Native Hawaiian and Other Pacific Islander | 0 | 0.0% |
| Some other race | 2,248 | 26.8% |
| Two or more races | 1,375 | 16.4% |
| Hispanic or Latino (of any race) | 4,153 | 49.6% |

=== 2010 census ===
At the 2010 census there were 8,298 people, 2,816 households, and 1,866 families living in the city. The population density was 1,268.8 inhabitants per square mile (489.9/km^{2}). There were 2,968 housing units at an average density of 453.8 per square mile (175.2/km^{2}). The racial makeup of the city was 70.6% White, 2.3% African American, 0.6% Native American, 1.0% Asian, 0.2% Pacific Islander, 23.0% from other races, and 2.3% from two or more races. Hispanic or Latino of any race were 42.1%.

Of the 2,816 households 38.0% had children under the age of 18 living with them, 48.8% were married couples living together, 11.1% had a female householder with no husband present, 6.4% had a male householder with no wife present, and 33.7% were non-families. 28.1% of households were one person and 13.7% were one person aged 65 or older. The average household size was 2.75 and the average family size was 3.36.

The median age was 32.6 years. 29% of residents were under the age of 18; 11.3% were between the ages of 18 and 24; 24.5% were from 25 to 44; 21.3% were from 45 to 64; and 13.9% were 65 or older. The gender makeup of the city was 50.7% male and 49.3% female.

=== 2000 census ===
As of the census of 2000, there were 7,339 people, 2,674 households, and 1,756 families living in the city. The population density was 1,185.5 inhabitants per square mile (457.7/km^{2}). There were 2,837 housing units at an average density of 458.3 per square mile (177.0/km^{2}). The racial makeup as reported by the Census was 86.92% White, 1.59% African American, 0.45% Native American, 0.82% Asian, 0.01% Pacific Islander, 9.02% from other races, and 1.19% from two or more races. Hispanic or Latino of any race were 17.36% of the population.

Racial diversity in Dension has been increasing since the mid-1980s. According to a New York Times article, 20% of Denison's high-school age children were nonwhite in 2005, compared to approximately 50% of kindergarteners.

Of the 2,674 households 31.7% had children under the age of 18 living with them, 51.9% were married couples living together, 9.1% had a female householder with no husband present, and 34.3% were non-families. 28.9% of households were one person and 15.0% were one person aged 65 or older. The average household size was 2.53 and the average family size was 3.08.

The age distribution was26.0% under the age of 18, 11.2% from 18 to 24, 26.3% from 25 to 44, 19.3% from 45 to 64, and 17.2% 65 or older. The median age was 35 years. For every 100 females, there were 95.3 males. For every 100 females age 18 and over, there were 92.3 males.

The median household income was $33,187 and the median family income was $41,362. Males had a median income of $30,145 versus $20,538 for females. The per capita income for the city was $15,391. About 6.1% of families and 12.1% of the population were below the poverty line, including 9.7% of those under age 18 and 4.2% of those age 65 or over.

== Arts and culture ==
Sites in Denison listed on the National Register of Historic Places include:

- Carey House
- Clarence D. Chamberlin House
- Crawford County Courthouse
- Park Motel
- William A. McHenry House
- Yellow Smoke Park Bridge

== Government ==
Denison is governed by a mayor and a five-member city council

The Denison Mayor is the chief executive officer of the city and presiding officer of the city council. The Denison Mayor serves a 2-year term. The current mayor of Denison is Pam Soseman. (Elected: November 2019 | Term: December 31, 2021)

Denison City Council members serve overlapping four-year terms. The council consists of one representative from each of the city's three wards, plus two at-large representatives.

Denison's City Manager is Ned Ahart.

The City of Denison is organized into the following departments: Administration, Public Works, Library, Aquatic Center, Fire Department, Police Department, and Conference Center.

== Education ==
The Denison Community School District operates area public schools.

== Notable people ==
- Kyle Borland, NFL player
- Charles Congden Carpenter, naturalist and herpetologist
- Clarence Duncan Chamberlin, aviation pioneer
- James Perry Conner (1851–1924) five-term U.S. representative from 1900 to 1909
- Chuck Darling, member of 1956 Summer Olympics basketball gold medalists, First team All-American at University of Iowa
- Jim Garrison, New Orleans District Attorney who investigated Kennedy assassination conspiracy theories
- Arthur C. Greene (1881–1958), member of the Iowa House of Representatives
- James E. Hansen, head of NASA's Goddard Institute for Space Studies
- Donna Reed, Academy Award-winning actress; Donna Reed Foundation's headquarters are in Denison
- Brandon Scherff, offensive guard for the NFL's Washington Commanders and Jacksonville Jaguars
- L.M. Shaw (1848–1932) 17th governor of Iowa and United States Secretary of the Treasury
