= Charter Oak, Iowa =

- City
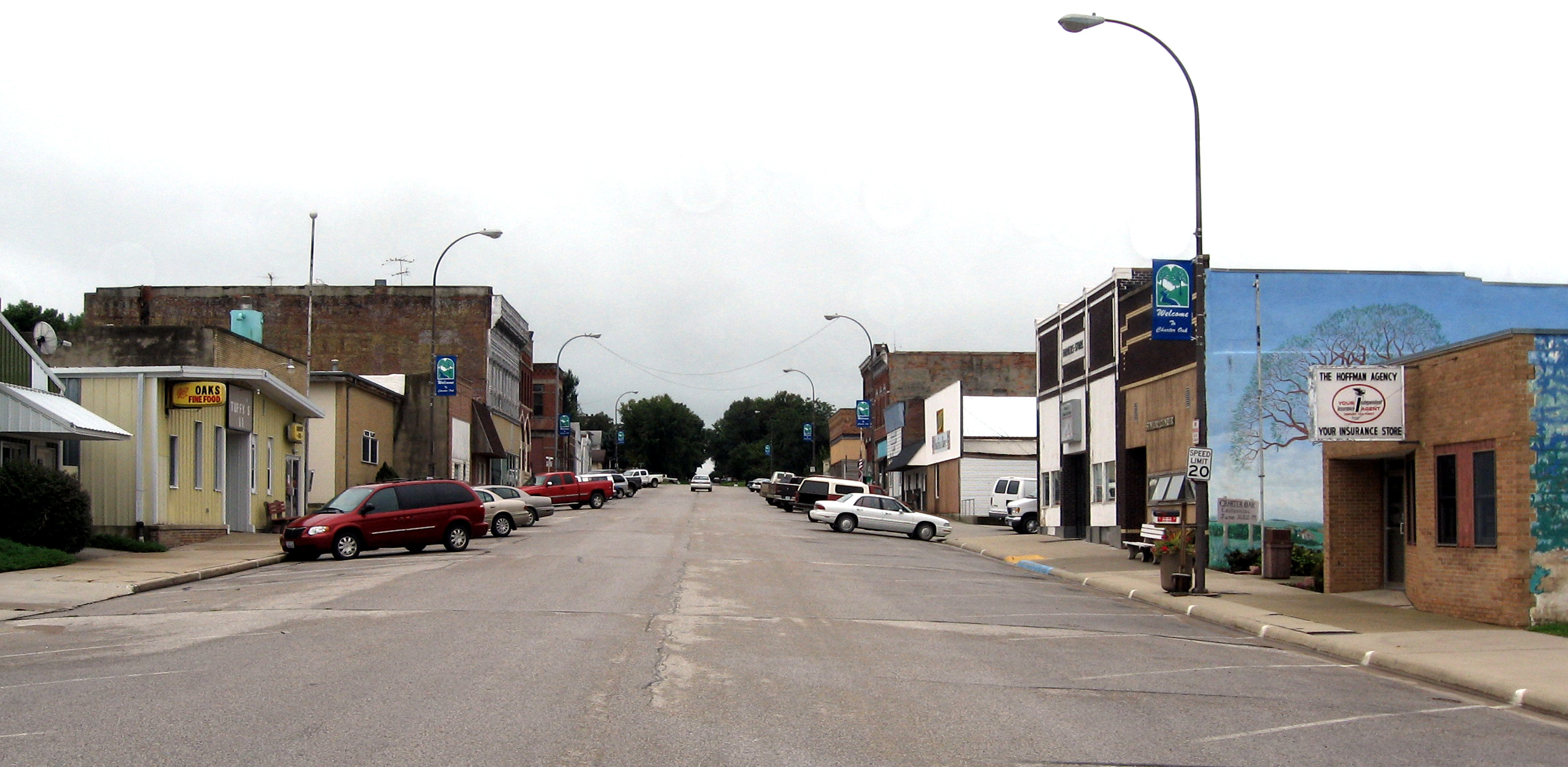
- Downtown Charter Oak, Iowa

- Location of Charter Oak, Iowa
- Coordinates: 42°04′06″N 95°35′23″W
- Country: United States
- State: Iowa
- County: Crawford

Area
  - Total: 0.52 sq mi (1.35 km^{2})
  - Land: 0.51 sq mi (1.33 km^{2})
  - Water: 0.0077 sq mi (0.02 km^{2})
- Elevation: 1,276 ft (389 m)

Population (2020)
  - Total: 535
  - Density: 1,042.1/sq mi (402.36/km^{2})
- Time zone: UTC-6 (Central (CST))
  - Summer (DST): UTC-5 (CDT)
- ZIP code: 51439
- Area code: 712
- FIPS code: 19-12900
- GNIS feature ID: 2393807
- Website: http://www.charteroakia.com/

Charter Oak is a city in Crawford County, Iowa, United States, along the East Soldier River. The population was 535 at the 2020 census.

== History ==
Charter Oak was first mentioned in newspapers August 13, 1869. The town Post Office was established May 4, 1876. The Chicago, Milwaukee & St. Paul Railway was completed in February 1887, bringing the train through town twice daily as it hauled postage and freight from Manilla to Sioux City. Articles of Incorporation were filed for the town of Charter Oak February 14, 1891.

Charter Oak was a busy community with many businesses to employ community members. The first school was built in 1889, as the community grew the school became too small. The current school building was built in 1916. In 1929 the first street was paved.

In 1980 the freight service on the Chicago, Milwaukee, & St. Paul Railroad ended, the rail line was removed, and the station was sold.

== Geography ==
According to the United States Census Bureau, the city has a total area of 0.48 square miles (1.24 km^{2}), all land.

=== Major Highway ===
Iowa Highway 141

== Demographics ==
Historical populations
Year	Pop.	±%
1890	567	—
1900	772	+36.2%
1910	734	−4.9%
1920	750	+2.2%
1930	688	−8.3%
1940	776	+12.8%
1950	710	−8.5%
1960	665	−6.3%
1970	715	+7.5%
1980	615	−14.0%
1990	497	−19.2%
2000	530	+6.6%
2010	502	−5.3%
2020	535	+6.6%
Source:"U.S. Census website". United States Census Bureau. and Iowa Data Center; Source: U.S. Decennial Census

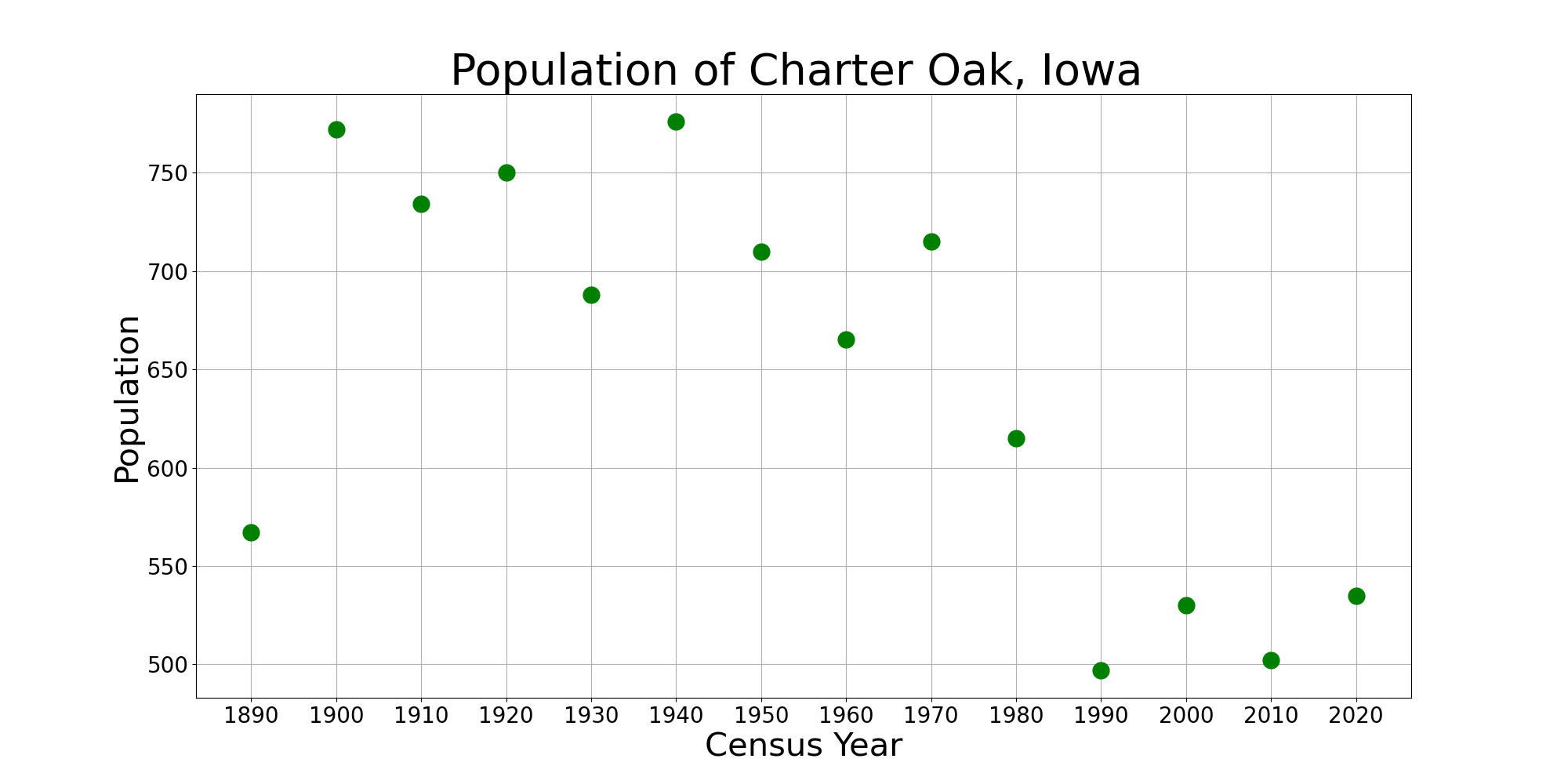
The population of Charter Oak, Iowa from US census data

=== 2020 census ===
As of the census of 2020, there were 535 people, 234 households, and 126 families residing in the city. The population density was 1,042.1 inhabitants per square mile (402.4/km^{2}). There were 252 housing units at an average density of 490.9 per square mile (189.5/km^{2}). The racial makeup of the city was 90.7% White, 0.6% Black or African American, 0.0% Native American, 0.0% Asian, 0.4% Pacific Islander, 4.3% from other races and 4.1% from two or more races. Hispanic or Latino persons of any race comprised 7.7% of the population.

Of the 234 households, 29.5% of which had children under the age of 18 living with them, 38.9% were married couples living together, 9.8% were cohabitating couples, 23.1% had a female householder with no spouse or partner present and 28.2% had a male householder with no spouse or partner present. 46.2% of all households were non-families. 36.8% of all households were made up of individuals, 12.0% had someone living alone who was 65 years old or older.

The median age in the city was 36.2 years. 28.8% of the residents were under the age of 20; 6.2% were between the ages of 20 and 24; 24.7% were from 25 and 44; 23.4% were from 45 and 64; and 17.0% were 65 years of age or older. The gender makeup of the city was 50.8% male and 49.2% female.

=== 2010 census ===
As of the census of 2010, there were 502 people, 229 households, and 125 families living in the city. The population density was 1,045.8 inhabitants per square mile (403.8/km^{2}). There were 268 housing units at an average density of 558.3 per square mile (215.6/km^{2}). The racial makeup of the city was 95.6% White, 0.6% African American, 1.4% Asian, 1.0% from other races, and 1.4% from two or more races. Hispanic or Latino of any race were 7.2% of the population.

There were 229 households, of which 26.6% had children under the age of 18 living with them, 42.4% were married couples living together, 7.4% had a female householder with no husband present, 4.8% had a male householder with no wife present, and 45.4% were non-families. 41.5% of all households were made up of individuals, and 18.3% had someone living alone who was 65 years of age or older. The average household size was 2.19 and the average family size was 2.94.

The median age in the city was 42.5 years. 25.1% of residents were under the age of 18; 7.7% were between the ages of 18 and 24; 18.8% were from 25 to 44; 30.8% were from 45 to 64; and 17.9% were 65 years of age or older. The gender makeup of the city was 47.4% male and 52.6% female.

=== 2000 census ===
As of the census of 2000, there were 530 people, 245 households, and 149 families living in the city. The population density was 1,084.4 inhabitants per square mile (418.7/km^{2}). There were 275 housing units at an average density of 562.6 per square mile (217.2/km^{2}). The racial makeup of the city was 99.62% White and 0.38% Asian. Hispanic or Latino of any race were 0.19% of the population.

There were 245 households, out of which 24.9% had children under the age of 18 living with them, 53.9% were married couples living together, 4.9% had a female householder with no husband present, and 38.8% were non-families. 37.6% of all households were made up of individuals, and 23.3% had someone living alone who was 65 years of age or older. The average household size was 2.16 and the average family size was 2.83.

In the city, the population was spread out, with 23.0% under the age of 18, 5.7% from 18 to 24, 24.7% from 25 to 44, 22.6% from 45 to 64, and 24.0% who were 65 years of age or older. The median age was 42 years. For every 100 females, there were 95.6 males. For every 100 females age 18 and over, there were 91.5 males.

The median income for a household in the city was $33,482, and the median income for a family was $40,781. Males had a median income of $26,838 versus $19,712 for females. The per capita income for the city was $16,583. About 3.1% of families and 5.5% of the population were below the poverty line, including none of those under age 18 and 14.4% of those age 65 or over.

== Education ==
Charter Oak–Ute Community School District; consisting of Charter Oak, Soldier, and Ute; operates a K-8 public school.

Charter Oak-Ute CSD is in a Whole Grade Sharing partnership with Maple Valley Anthon-Oto CSD for grades 9-12.

Open Enrollment allows students to enroll in other districts, neighboring districts that students also enroll in are Denison Community School District and Boyer Valley Community School District, following the terms and conditions of Iowa Code 282.18 and Iowa Administrative Code 281-17.
