= Manilla, Iowa =

- City
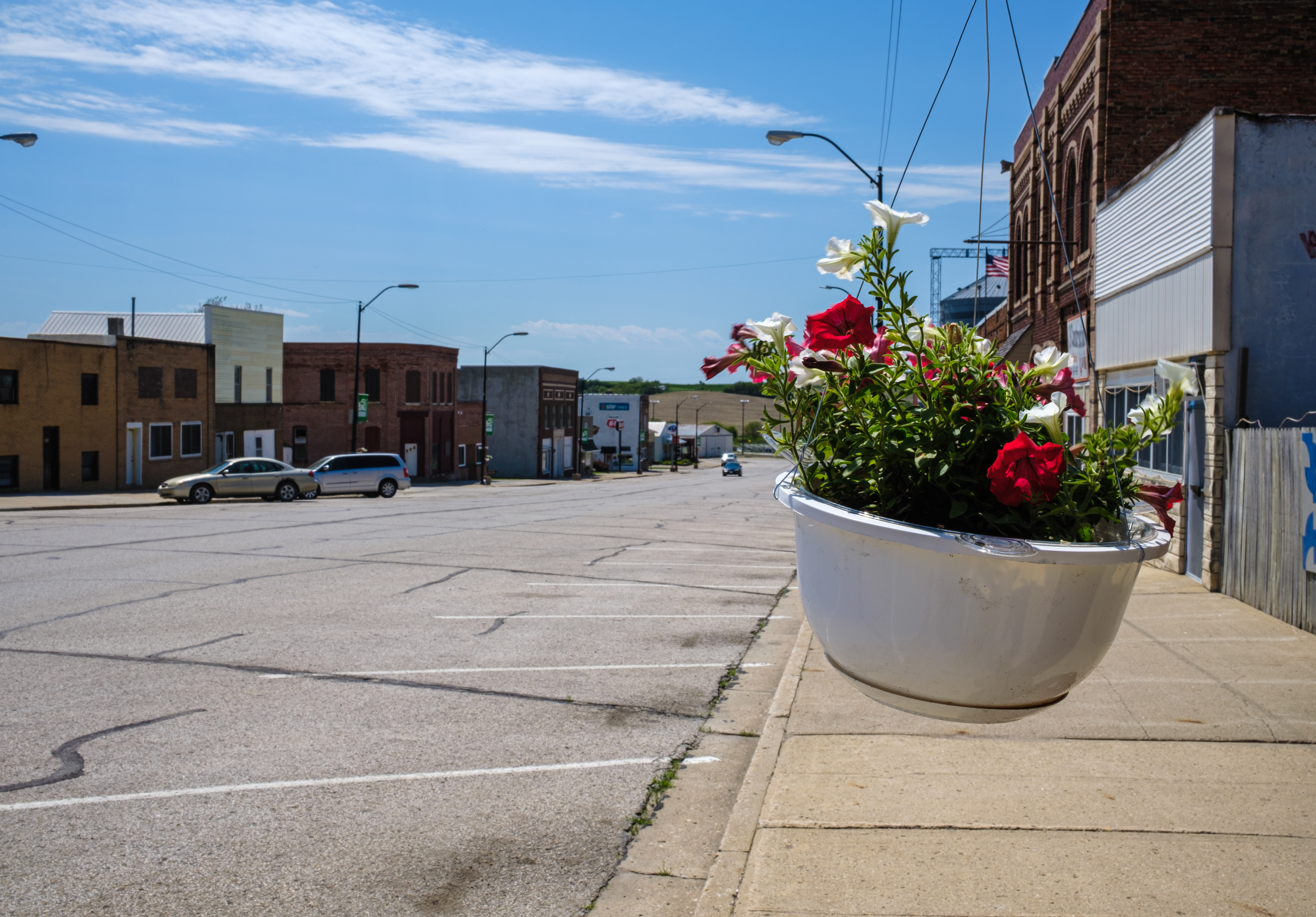
- Main Street

- Location of Manilla, Iowa
- Coordinates: 41°53′33″N 95°14′04″W
- Country: United States
- State: Iowa
- County: Crawford

Area
  - Total: 1.06 sq mi (2.75 km^{2})
  - Land: 1.06 sq mi (2.75 km^{2})
  - Water: 0 sq mi (0.00 km^{2})
- Elevation: 1,319 ft (402 m)

Population (2020)
  - Total: 775
  - Density: 729/sq mi (281.4/km^{2})
- Time zone: UTC-6 (Central (CST))
  - Summer (DST): UTC-5 (CDT)
- ZIP code: 51454
- Area code: 712
- FIPS code: 19-48855
- GNIS feature ID: 2395830
- Website: www.manillaia.com

Manilla is a city in Crawford County, Iowa, United States, along the West Branch of the West Nishnabotna River. The population was 775 at the time of the 2020 United States census.

== History ==
Manilla is working to bolster its declining population by providing free land and property tax abatements to attract new residents.

== Geography ==
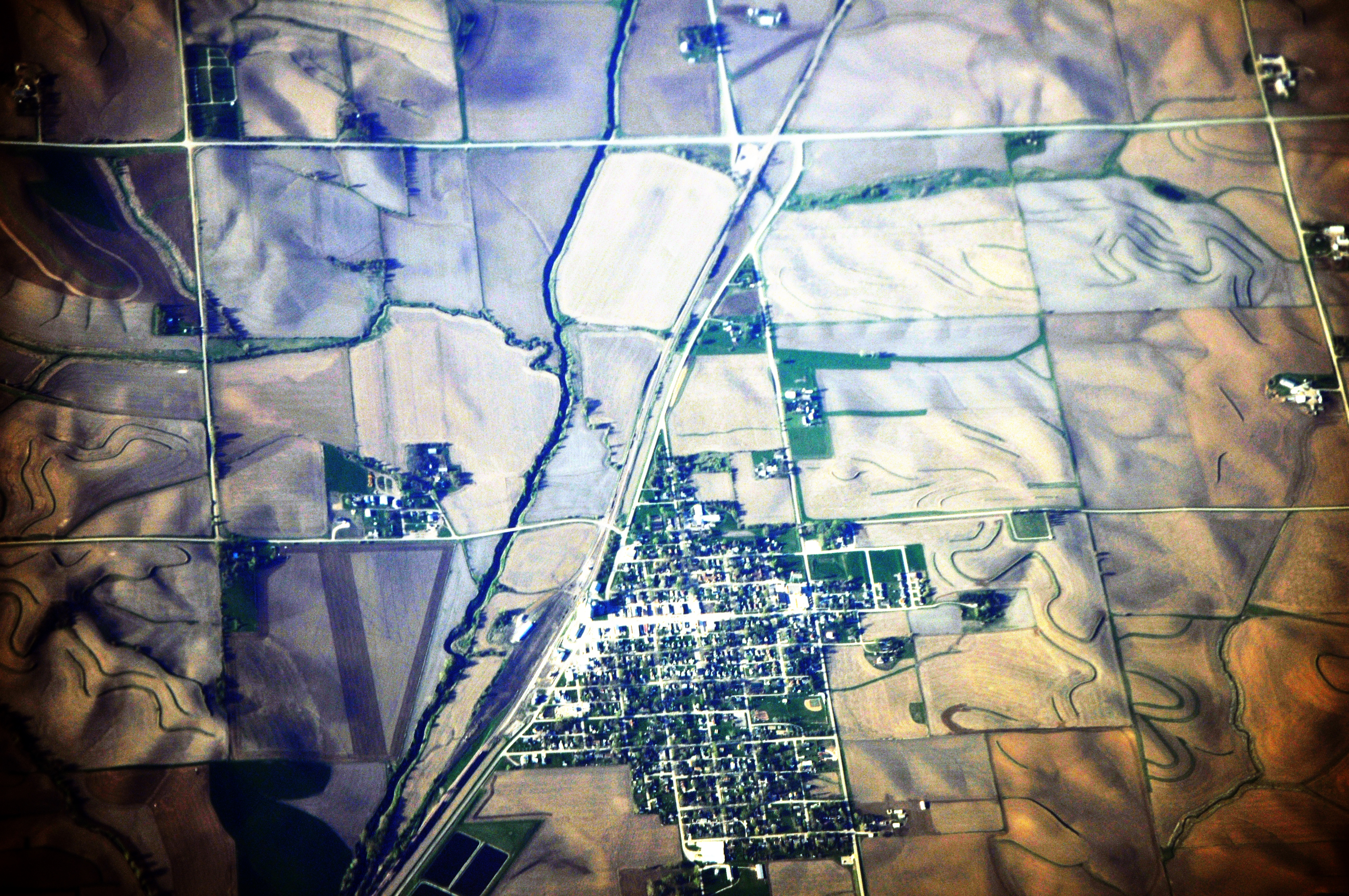
Aerial photo of Manilla, Iowa

According to the United States Census Bureau, the city has a total area of 1.03 square miles (2.67 km^{2}), all land.

== Demographics ==
Historical populations
Year	Pop.	±%
1890	526	—
1900	773	+47.0%
1910	875	+13.2%
1920	1,142	+30.5%
1930	1,032	−9.6%
1940	1,040	+0.8%
1950	1,035	−0.5%
1960	939	−9.3%
1970	943	+0.4%
1980	1,020	+8.2%
1990	898	−12.0%
2000	839	−6.6%
2010	776	−7.5%
2020	775	−0.1%
Source:"U.S. Census website". United States Census Bureau. and Iowa Data Center; Source: U.S. Decennial Census

=== 2020 census ===
As of the census of 2020, there were 775 people, 328 households, and 204 families residing in the city. The population density was 728.8 inhabitants per square mile (281.4/km^{2}). There were 368 housing units at an average density of 346.1 per square mile (133.6/km^{2}). The racial makeup of the city was 88.9% White, 0.1% Black or African American, 0.0% Native American, 0.4% Asian, 0.1% Pacific Islander, 4.9% from other races and 5.5% from two or more races. Hispanic or Latino persons of any race comprised 8.0% of the population.

Of the 328 households, 25.0% of which had children under the age of 18 living with them, 50.6% were married couples living together, 6.7% were cohabitating couples, 24.4% had a female householder with no spouse or partner present and 18.3% had a male householder with no spouse or partner present. 37.8% of all households were non-families. 31.7% of all households were made up of individuals, 14.9% had someone living alone who was 65 years old or older.

The median age in the city was 46.1 years. 24.0% of the residents were under the age of 20; 5.3% were between the ages of 20 and 24; 20.4% were from 25 and 44; 26.8% were from 45 and 64; and 23.5% were 65 years of age or older. The gender makeup of the city was 50.2% male and 49.8% female.

=== 2010 census ===
As of the census of 2010, there were 776 people, 337 households, and 214 families living in the city. The population density was 753.4 inhabitants per square mile (290.9/km^{2}). There were 369 housing units at an average density of 358.3 per square mile (138.3/km^{2}). The racial makeup of the city was 97.9% White, 0.1% Asian, 1.2% from other races, and 0.8% from two or more races. Hispanic or Latino of any race were 2.6% of the population.

There were 337 households, of which 27.0% had children under the age of 18 living with them, 49.9% were married couples living together, 8.9% had a female householder with no husband present, 4.7% had a male householder with no wife present, and 36.5% were non-families. 33.5% of all households were made up of individuals, and 18.1% had someone living alone who was 65 years of age or older. The average household size was 2.18 and the average family size was 2.74.

The median age in the city was 47.7 years. 20.9% of residents were under the age of 18; 5.4% were between the ages of 18 and 24; 19.5% were from 25 to 44; 27.4% were from 45 to 64; and 26.7% were 65 years of age or older. The gender makeup of the city was 47.6% male and 52.4% female.

=== 2000 census ===
As of the census of 2000, there were 839 people, 337 households, and 222 families living in the city. The population density was 1,059.2 inhabitants per square mile (409.0/km^{2}). There were 369 housing units at an average density of 465.8 per square mile (179.8/km^{2}). The racial makeup of the city was 97.74% White, 0.24% African American, 0.36% from other races, and 1.67% from two or more races. Hispanic or Latino of any race were 0.48% of the population.

There were 337 households, out of which 27.3% had children under the age of 18 living with them, 56.7% were married couples living together, 7.1% had a female householder with no husband present, and 34.1% were non-families. 30.3% of all households were made up of individuals, and 17.5% had someone living alone who was 65 years of age or older. The average household size was 2.31 and the average family size was 2.89.

In the city, the population was spread out, with 22.8% under the age of 18, 6.8% from 18 to 24, 21.8% from 25 to 44, 21.1% from 45 to 64, and 27.5% who were 65 years of age or older. The median age was 44 years. For every 100 females, there were 90.2 males. For every 100 females age 18 and over, there were 86.2 males.

The median income for a household was $31,146, and the median income for a family was $37,625. Males had a median income of $27,292 versus $16,875 for females. The per capita income for the city was $14,011. About 10.5% of families and 12.1% of the population were below the poverty line, including 17.2% of those under age 18 and 7.0% of those age 65 or over.

== Education ==
Manilla is served by the IKM–Manning Community School District. The district previously operated a middle school in Manilla but it closed in 2014; at the time the district continued to have its headquarters there.

The Manilla Community School District was formed as a consolidation of various area school districts in 1889, and a four classroom building served as the first school in the city. In 1904 the first class graduated. A new school building funded by a $45,000 bond opened in 1915. In 1956 the school was renamed the Manilla Community School. On July 1, 1992, the Manilla district merged into the IKM Community School District. That in turn, on July 1, 2011, merged into IKM–Manning.
