= National Register of Historic Places listings in Carroll County, Iowa =

Location of Carroll County in Iowa

This is a list of the National Register of Historic Places listings in Carroll County, Iowa.

This is intended to be a complete list of the properties and districts on the National Register of Historic Places in Carroll County, Iowa, United States. Latitude and longitude coordinates are provided for many National Register properties and districts; these locations may be seen together in a map.

There are 19 properties and districts listed on the National Register in the county.

This National Park Service list is complete through NPS recent listings posted March 21, 2025.

	Name on the Register	Image	Date listed	Location	City or town	Description
1	American Express Building-Carroll	American Express Building-Carroll	September 6, 1990 (#90001299)	Junction of N. West and W. 5th Sts. 42°03′55″N 94°52′18″W	Carroll	
2	Armour Creameries Poultry House		November 18, 2011 (#11000815)	218 5th Ave. S. 41°52′10″N 94°40′39″W	Coon Rapids	
3	Carnegie Library Building		November 13, 1976 (#76000739)	125 E. 6th St. 42°03′58″N 94°51′58″W	Carroll	
4	Carroll City-Mount Olivet Cemetery		February 10, 2022 (#100007432)	South Grant Rd. 42°03′21″N 94°51′38″W	Carroll	
5	Chicago & Northwestern Passenger Depot and Baggage Room-Carroll	Chicago & Northwestern Passenger Depot and Baggage Room-Carroll	September 6, 1990 (#90001302)	Junction of N. West and W. 5th Sts. 42°03′56″N 94°52′21″W	Carroll	
6	Fobes Octagon Barn		June 30, 1986 (#86001420)	Iowa Highway 286; 42°08′14″N 94°42′30″W	Lanesboro	
7	Graham Park Historic District		May 23, 2024 (#100010399)	North Grant Road; 42°04′03″N 94°51′35″W	Carroll	
8	Holy Guardian Angels Church and Cemetery Historic District		May 9, 2019 (#04001424)	Jade Ave. and 245th St. 42°00′01″N 94°55′02″W	Roselle	
9	Kittyhawk Avenue Bridge		June 25, 1998 (#98000749)	Kittyhawk Ave. over an unnamed stream 42°01′47″N 94°53′52″W	Carroll	
10	William A. Leet and Frederick Hassler Farmstead District		May 5, 1999 (#99000526)	12196 311th St. 41°54′19″N 95°02′58″W	Manning	
11	Manning Commercial Historic District	Manning Commercial Historic District	October 23, 2015 (#15000745)	217-411, 413-507, 302-326 Main, 717-723 3rd, 303 Center & 825 5th Sts. 41°54′32″N 95°03′54″W	Manning	
12	Manning Milwaukee Railroad Trestle		August 21, 2020 (#100005487)	Crosses Railroad/Center St., 682 ft. north of Julia St. 41°54′50″N 95°03′48″W	Manning	
13	Manning Water Tower		May 31, 2016 (#16000296)	620 3rd Street; 41°54′32″N 95°03′47″W	Manning	
14	Olympic Avenue Bridge		June 25, 1998 (#98000747)	Olympic Avenue over an unnamed stream 42°06′53″N 94°48′45″W	Carroll	
15	Quail Avenue Bridge		June 25, 1998 (#98000750)	Quail Ave. over an unnamed stream 42°01′50″N 94°47′00″W	Carroll	
16	Robin Avenue Bridge		June 25, 1998 (#98000748)	Robin Ave. over an unnamed stream 42°05′51″N 94°45′51″W	Carroll	Replaced in 2013.
17	Storm Creek Bridge		June 25, 1998 (#98000744)	Phoenix Ave. over Storm Creek; 42°06′07″N 94°48′11″W	Carroll	
18	Storm Creek Bridge 2		June 25, 1998 (#98000746)	190th St. over Storm Creek; 42°04′42″N 94°46′49″W	Carroll	

== Former listings ==
	Name on the Register	Image	Date listed	Date removed	Location	City or town	Description
1	Coon Rapids Bridge		June 25, 1998 (#98000745)	October 15, 2014	Sumpter Ave. over the Middle Raccoon River; 41°51′54″N 94°40′38″W	Coon Rapids	

== See also ==
- List of National Historic Landmarks in Iowa
- National Register of Historic Places listings in Iowa
- Listings in neighboring counties: Audubon, Calhoun, Crawford, Greene, Guthrie, Sac
