= Standard Bridge Company =

Standard Bridge Company was an American bridge company that was "one of the most important bridge building firms in Nebraska history."

It was founded by Robert Z. Drake in 1900, and incorporated a former bridge company of John Means in 1902.

The firm obtained annual contracts with Cuming, Wayne, Thurston, Stanton, Dodge and Burt counties and built hundreds of half-hip truss bridges during 1900–1920; the oldest documented example is the Rattlesnake Creek Bridge built in 1903.

A number of its works are listed on the U.S. National Register of Historic Places.

Works include:

- Rattlesnake Creek Bridge (1903), county road over Rattlesnake Cr., 2.8 mi. NW of Bancroft, NE (Standard Bridge Co.), NRHP-listed
- Kittyhawk Avenue Bridge (1913), Kittyhawk Ave. over an unnamed stream, 3.1 mi. SW of Carroll, IA (Standard Bridge Co.), NRHP-listed
- Nine Bridges Bridge (1913), private road over Middle Channel of the Platte River, 3.9 mi. N of Doniphan, NE Standard Bridge Co., NRHP-listed
- Olympic Avenue Bridge (1913), Olympic Ave. over an unnamed stream, 4.2 mi. NE of Carroll, IA (Standard Bridge Co.), NRHP-listed
- North Omaha Creek Bridge, township road over N. Omaha Cr., 3 mi. SW of Winnebago, NE (Standard Bridge Co.), NRHP-listed
- Old Redwater Bridge, local road over the Redwater River, Spearfish, SD (Standard Bridge Company), NRHP-listed
- Quail Avenue Bridge, built 1913, Quail Ave. over an unnamed stream, 4.5 mi. SE of Carroll, IA (Standard Bridge Co.), NRHP-listed
- Robin Avenue Bridge, built 1913, Robin Ave. over an unnamed stream, 5.5 mi. SE of Carroll, IA (Standard Bridge Co.), NRHP-listed
- Sargent Bridge, Dawson St. over the Middle Loup River, 1 mi. S of Sargent, NE (Standard Bridge Co.), NRHP-listed
- South Dakota Department of Transportation Bridge No. 51-051-000, local rd. over Big Sioux River, Lake Campbell Resort, SD (Standard Bridge Company), NRHP-listed
- South Dakota Dept. of Transportation Bridge No. 44-212-090, local rd. over the E. fork of the Vermillion River, Montrose, SD (Standard Bridge Company), NRHP-listed
- South Dakota Dept. of Transportation Bridge No. 62-220-512, local rd. over the Keya Paha River, Wewela, SD (Standard Bridge Co.), NRHP-listed
- Storm Creek Bridge, built 1913, Phoenix Ave. over Storm Creek, 4.0 mi. NE of Carroll, IA (Standard Bridge Co.), NRHP-listed
- Storm Creek Bridge 2, built 1913, 190th St. over Storm Creek, 4.3 mi. E of Carroll, IA (Standard Bridge Co.), NRHP-listed
- Sweetwater Mill Bridge, county road over Mud Creek, Sweetwater, NE (Standard Bridge Co.), NRHP-listed

== See also ==
- Western Bridge and Construction Company, another Nebraska bridge building company
