= Girder =

Support beam used in construction

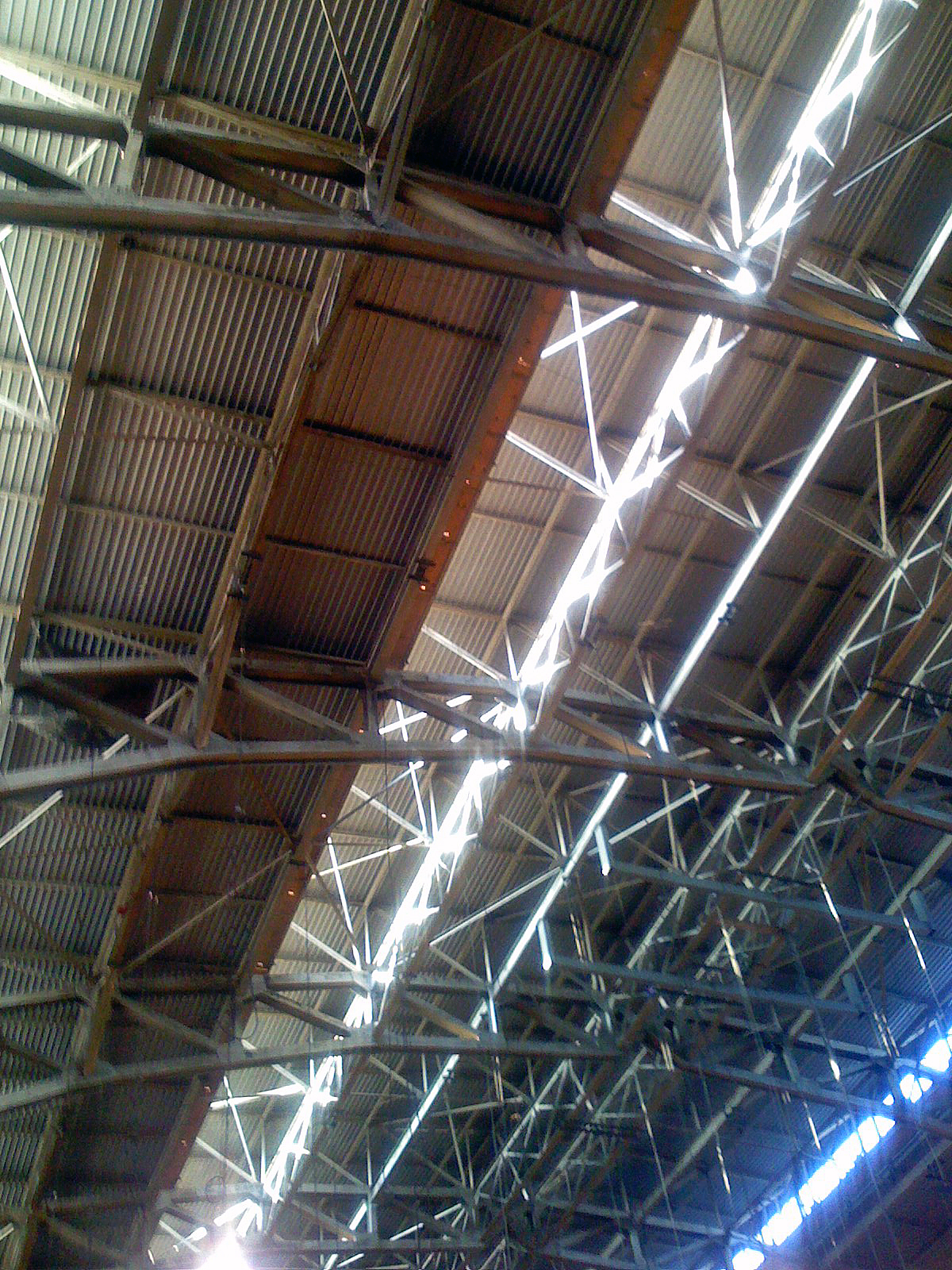
Ceiling of Hinkle Fieldhouse in Indianapolis, Indiana, is constructed of large trusses built of riveted girders

A girder (/ˈɡɜːrdər/) is a beam used in construction. It is the main horizontal support of a structure which supports smaller beams. Girders often have an I-beam cross section composed of two load-bearing flanges separated by a stabilizing web, but may also have a box shape, Z shape, or other forms. Girders are commonly used to build bridges.

A girt is a vertically aligned girder placed to resist shear loads.

Small steel girders are rolled into shape. Larger girders (1 m/3 feet deep or more) are made as plate girders, welded or bolted together from separate pieces of steel plate.

The Warren type girder replaces the solid web with an open latticework truss between the flanges. This arrangement combines strength with economy of materials, minimizing weight and thereby reducing loads and expense. Patented in 1848 by its designers James Warren and Willoughby Theobald Monzani, its structure consists of longitudinal members joined only by angled cross-members, forming alternately inverted equilateral triangle-shaped spaces along its length, ensuring that no individual strut, beam, or tie is subject to bending or torsional straining forces, but only to tension or compression. It is an improvement over the Neville truss, which uses a spacing configuration of isosceles triangles.

== Gallery ==
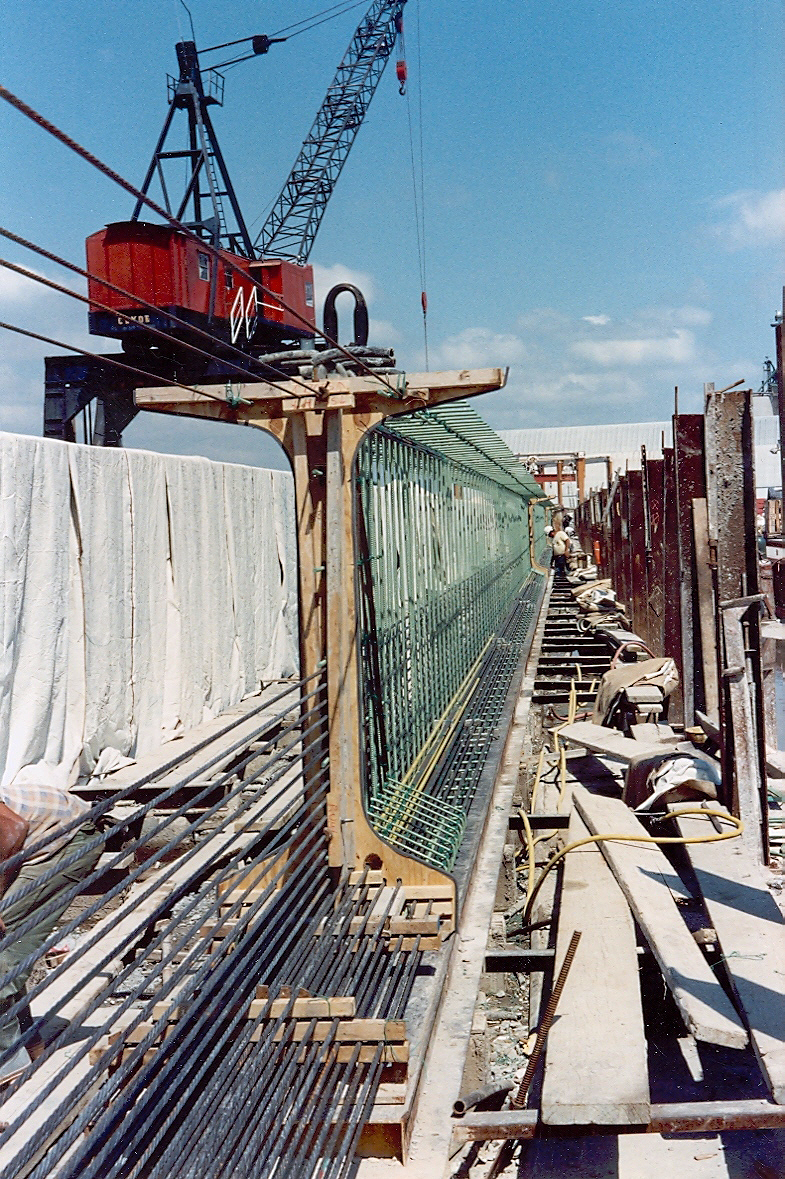
Rebar being placed before casting a prestressed concrete girder

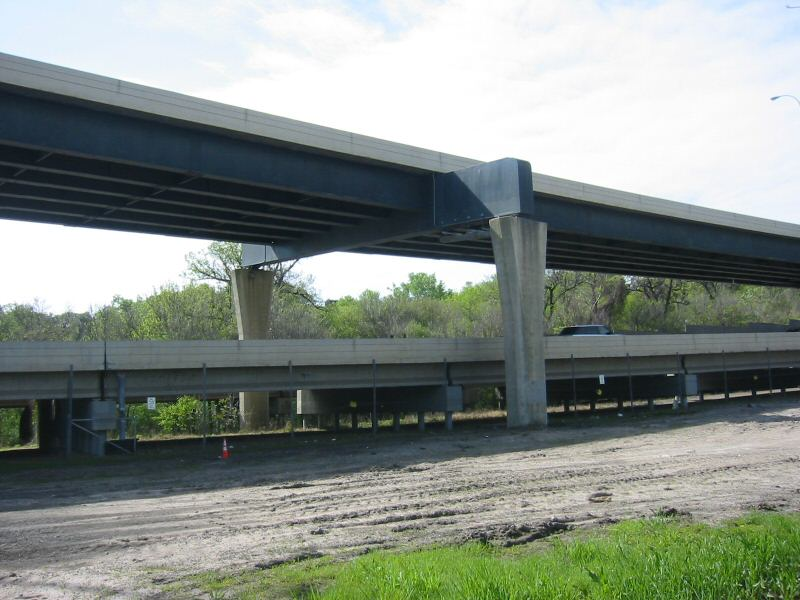
Bridge built using multiple I-girders

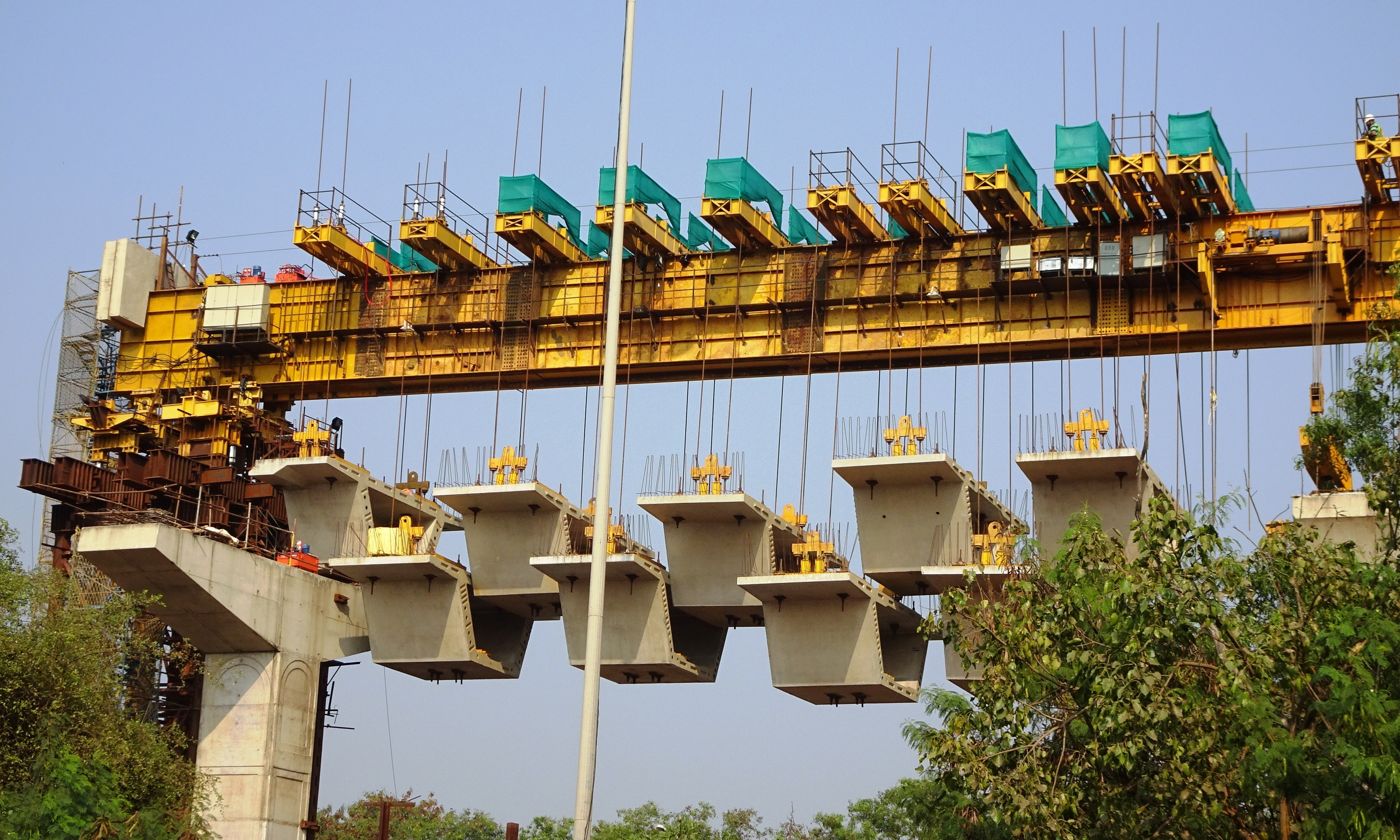
Box girder bridge being built by joining prefabricated segments

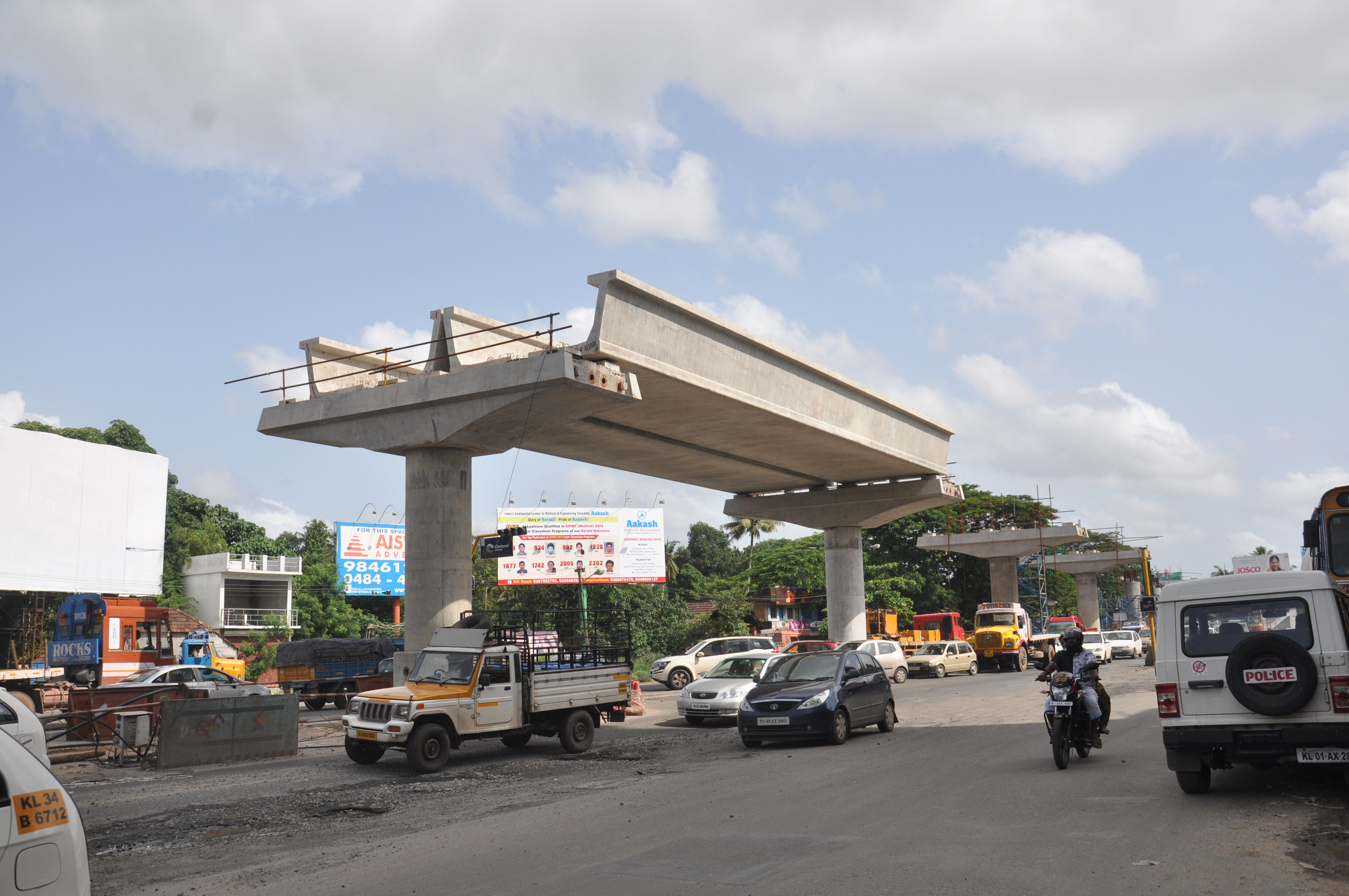
A viaduct being built using U-girders

== See also ==
- Box girder
- Joist
- Plate girder
- Structural steel
- Truss
- Universal beam
- Wide Flange Steel Materials and Rolling Processes (U.S.)
