= Quail Avenue Bridge =

- U.S. National Register of Historic Places
- Location within Iowa Location within the United States
- Location: Quail Ave. over an unnamed stream
- Nearest city: Carroll, Iowa
- Coordinates: 42°01′50″N 94°47′01″W
- Area: less than one acre
- Built: 1913
- Built by: Standard Bridge Company
- Architect: Iowa State Highway Commission
- Architectural style: Warren pony truss
- MPS: Highway Bridges of Iowa MPS
- NRHP reference No.: 98000750
- Added to NRHP: June 25, 1998

The Quail Avenue Bridge is located southeast of Carroll, Iowa, United States. The 37-foot (11 m) span carries traffic on Quail Avenue over an unnamed stream. This bridge was one of 15 similar spans that Carroll County had built in 1913. The county board of supervisors contracted with the Standard Bridge Company of Omaha to build the Warren pony truss structures that were designed by the Iowa State Highway Commission (ISHC). They were supported by a timber substructure. The bridges became the prototype of what would become the ISHC's standard design. Standard Bridge was paid $29,174 to build all the bridges, which included the costs for this bridge at $1,247. It was listed on the National Register of Historic Places in 1998.
