= American Express Building-Carroll =

Historic building in Iowa, United States

- U.S. National Register of Historic Places
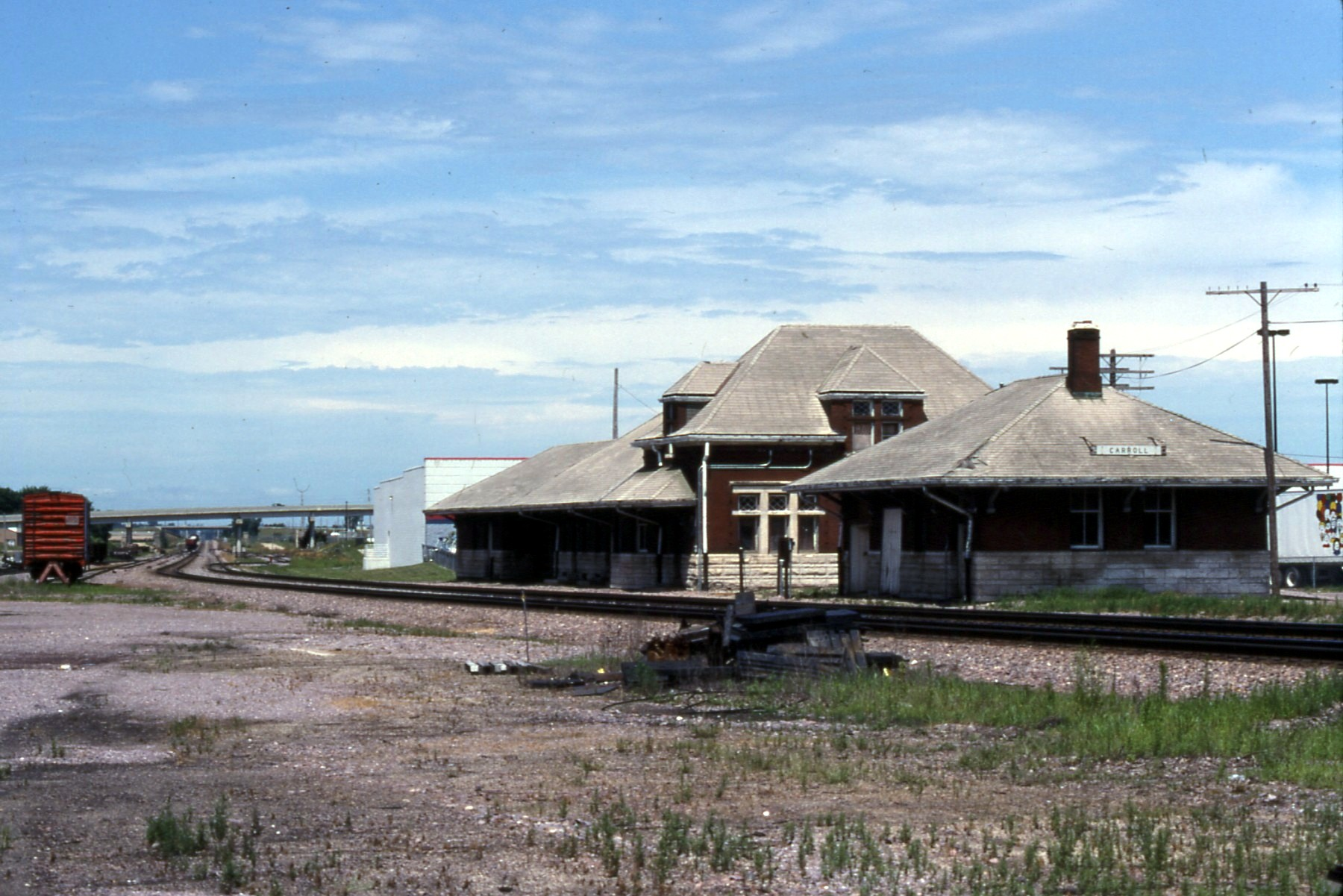
- The depot (left) and American Express building (right) in 1995

- Location within Iowa Location within the United States
- Location: Junction of N. West and W. 5th Sts., Carroll, Iowa
- Coordinates: 42°03′55″N 94°52′19″W
- Area: less than one acre
- Built: 1896
- Architect: Charles Sumner Frost
- Architectural style: Late 19th and Early 20th Century Revivals
- MPS: Advent & Development of Railroads in Iowa MPS
- NRHP reference No.: 90001299
- Added to NRHP: September 6, 1990

The American Express Building-Carroll, also known as the Carroll Express Building, is a historic structure located in Carroll, Iowa, United States. Like the Chicago & Northwestern Passenger Depot across the street, the express building is an example of a replacement station built during the Golden Age of Steam Railroading. It replaced a frame, structure that was built sometime between 1888 and 1893. The Chicago and North Western Railway (CNW) had built two branch lines from Carroll in 1877 and 1880, which increased business and necessitated the building of the original express building between 1883 and 1888. Chicago architect Charles Sumner Frost designed this building, and the depot. They are similar in design, and were both completed in 1896. The building was listed on the National Register of Historic Places in 1990.

American Express was one of several independent express companies that leased facilities from the railroads. The railroads also carried and serviced their cars for another fee. In general, this was a service to the railroads as these companies generally handled small shipments, which were not as cost-effective as the larger shipments they handled themselves.
