= Rattlesnake Creek Bridge =

- U.S. National Register of Historic Places
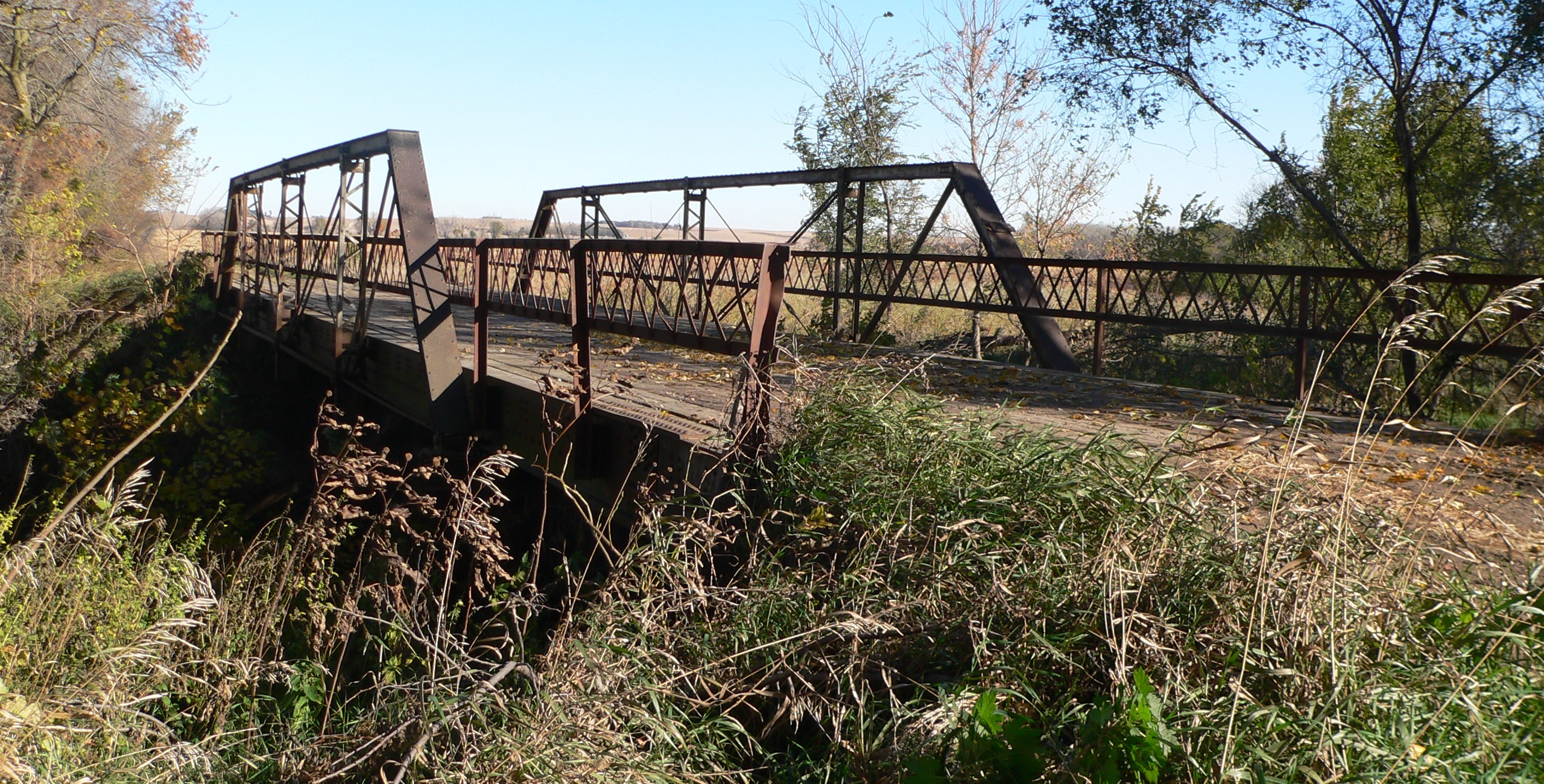

- Location within Nebraska Location within the United States
- Nearest city: West Point, Nebraska
- Coordinates: 42.044272°N 96.613588°W
- Area: less than one acre
- Built: 1903
- Built by: Standard Bridge Co.; Carnegie Steel Co.
- Architectural style: Pratt half-hip pony truss
- MPS: Highway Bridges in Nebraska MPS
- NRHP reference No.: 92000743
- Added to NRHP: June 29, 1992

The Rattlesnake Creek Bridge brings a Cuming County, Nebraska county road over Rattlesnake Creek, 2.8 miles northwest of Bancroft. It was built in 1903 and was listed on the National Register of Historic Places in 1992.

The road was gravel-surfaced in 1992.

It is a steel Pratt half-hip pony truss bridge, and the oldest known example of this type designed by the Standard Bridge Company of Omaha and built throughout eastern Nebraska. The bridge is 92 feet (28 m) long in total, with a single span of 60 feet (18 m) and a roadway width of 15.7 feet (4.8 m).

It was one of 60 new or rebuilt bridges in a bridge-building program started in 1903 by Cuming County. The Standard Bridge Company had an annual contract with Cuming, Wayne, Thurston, Stanton, Dodge and Burt counties and built hundreds of half-hip truss bridges during 1900–1920; this one is the oldest documented example.

In 2019, the bridge was relocated to a hiking trail housed in a West Point, Nebraska nature park, where it remains in use today by foot and bike traffic. Previously, the intact bridge was placed in a field in rural Cuming County unused.

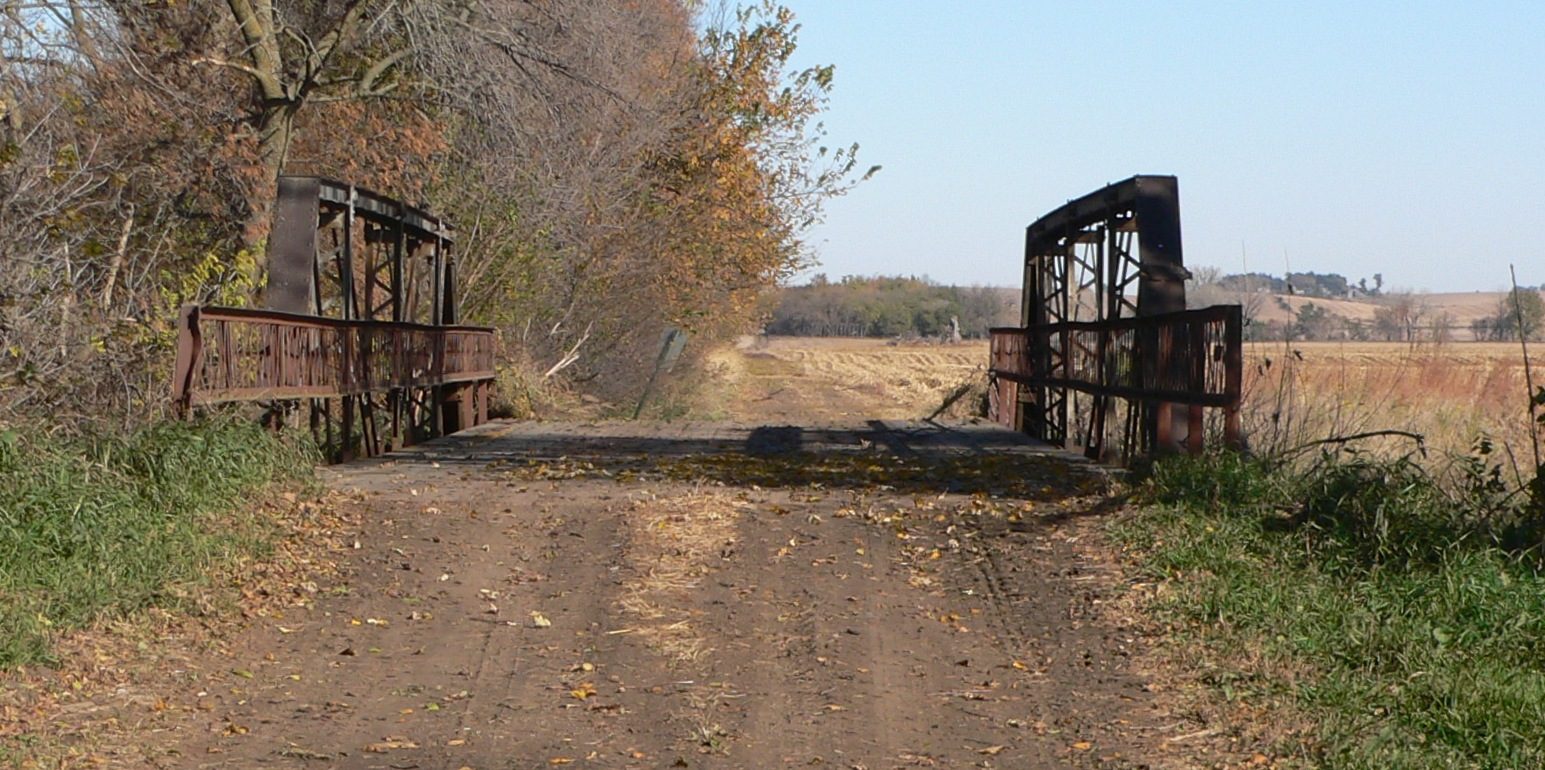
2010 photo

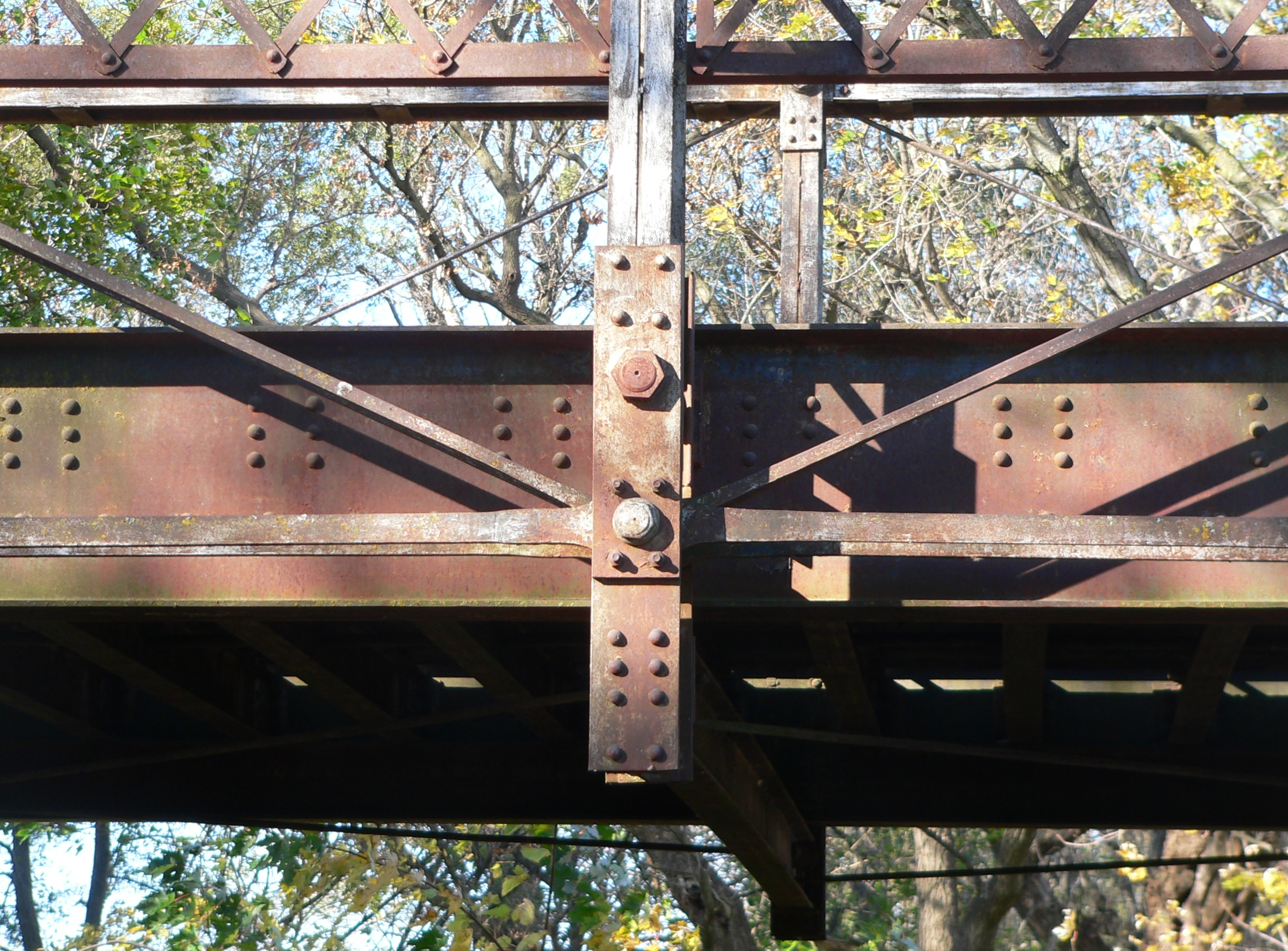
lower connection example
