= Nine Bridges Bridge =

- U.S. National Register of Historic Places
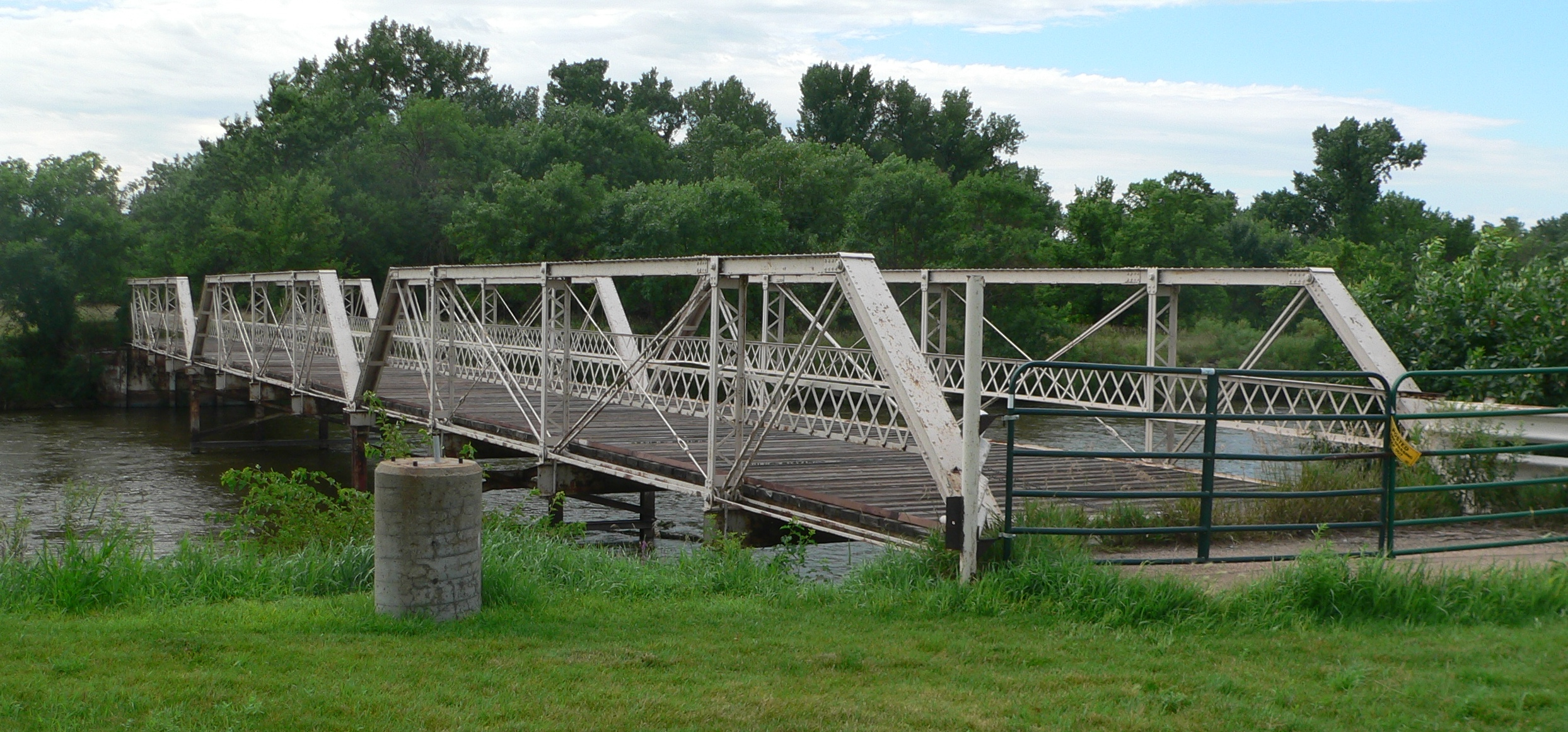
- Nine Bridges bridge, seen from the north bank.

- Location within Nebraska Location within the United States
- Nearest city: Doniphan, Nebraska
- Coordinates: 40°49′40″N 98°22′47″W
- Area: less than one acre
- Built: 1913
- Built by: Standard Bridge Co.; Jones & Laughlin Steel Co.
- Architectural style: Pratt half-hip pony truss
- MPS: Highway Bridges in Nebraska MPS
- NRHP reference No.: 92000716
- Added to NRHP: June 29, 1992

The Nine Bridges Bridge near Doniphan, Nebraska was built in 1913. It was built by the Standard Bridge Co. using Jones & Laughlin Steel Co.-rolled components. It brought Nine Bridges Road across the Middle Channel of the Platte River and now carries a private road.

It was listed on the U.S. National Register of Historic Places in 1992.
