= Manning Commercial Historic District (Manning, Iowa) =

Historic district in Iowa, United States

- U.S. National Register of Historic Places
- U.S. Historic district
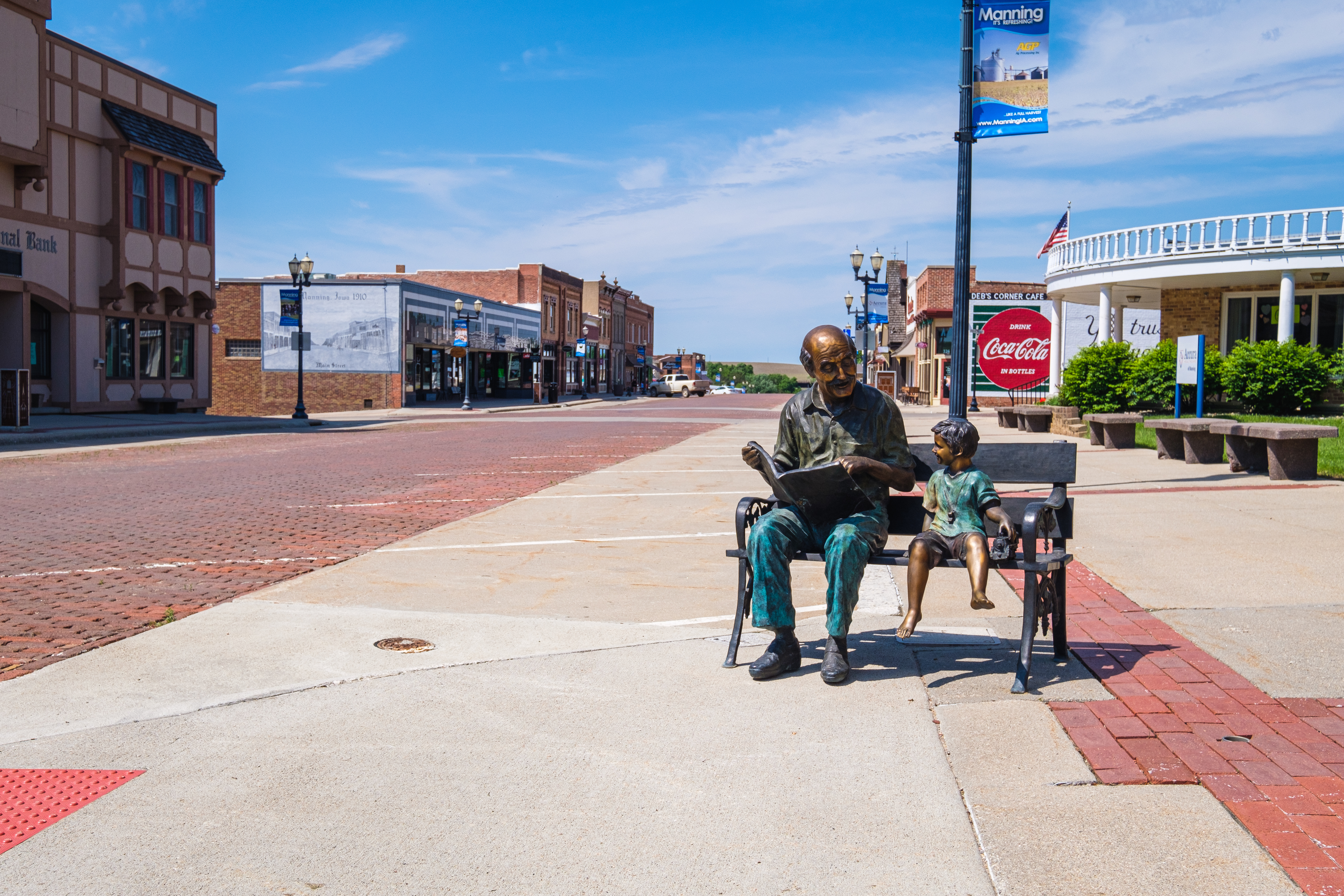

- Location within Iowa Location within the United States
- Location: 217-411, 413-507, 302-326 Main, 717-723 3rd, 303 Center & 825 5th Sts., Manning, Iowa
- Coordinates: 41°54′32″N 95°03′54″W
- Area: 9 acres (3.6 ha)
- Architectural style: Italianate; Romanesque Revival; Late 19th & early 20th century Revivals; Moderne
- MPS: Iowa's Main Street Commercial Architecture MPS
- NRHP reference No.: 15000745
- Added to NRHP: October 23, 2015

The Manning Commercial Historic District is a nationally recognized historic district located in Manning, Iowa, United States. It was listed on the National Register of Historic Places in 2015. At the time of its nomination it contained 37 resources, which included 26 contributing buildings, four contributing structures, and seven non-contributing buildings.

The historic district contains a mix of commercial buildings, which include specialty stores, financial institutions, healthcare, and professional offices. Civic buildings include city hall and the public library. The buildings were largely constructed of brick by local contractors. There were two commercial buildings designed by architects Samuel P. Hart of Carroll, Iowa and Charles W. Steinbaugh of Omaha. The period of significance is from 1885 to 1965, and the buildings were constructed during that time frame. Two destructive fires in 1891 and 1895 had a significant impact in shaping Manning's commercial district. Italianate, Romanesque Revival, and Moderne styles are dominant. The four structures are the brick-paved streets, which were originally paved in 1915 by C.L. Mosher of Sioux City, Iowa.

The city council enacted an ordinance in 1977 that required all new buildings and any remodeled facades to use a Bavarian theme to honor Manning's German heritage. Even though most of the German immigrants who settled here were not from Bavaria, it was thought to most people this was the most identifiable German architectural style. The ordinance was revoked in 2008 as part of the growing historic preservation movement in Manning.
