= Old Redwater Bridge =

- Redwater Bridge, Old
- U.S. National Register of Historic Places
- Location within South Dakota Location within the United States
- Nearest city: Spearfish, South Dakota
- Coordinates: 44°35′24″N 103°51′22″W
- Area: less than one acre
- Built: 1910
- Built by: Standard Bridge Company
- Architectural style: Pratt Truss
- MPS: Historic Bridges in South Dakota MPS
- NRHP reference No.: 93001300
- Added to NRHP: December 9, 1993

The Old Redwater Bridge near Spearfish, South Dakota was built in 1910. It was built by the Standard Bridge Company. It was listed on the National Register of Historic Places in 1993. It spans the Redwater River, south of Belle Fourche. The 70-foot-long (21 m) bridge was built in 1910 and has been listed on the National Register of Historic Places since 1993.
