= Tony Bernard Mosman =

American artist and writer

Anton Bernard Mosman
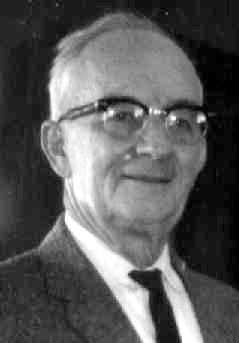
- Anton B. Mosman, in about 1980
- Born: September 11, 1886; Carroll, Iowa, U.S.
- Died: August 16, 1985 (aged 98); Carroll, Iowa, U.S.
- Resting place: Mount Olivet Cemetery; Carroll, Iowa, U.S.
- Spouses: Barbara Mary Wille (1886–1954) and Margaret Nees (1896–1989)
- Children: Freda Barbara (Stevens) Mosman (1914–1993); Grace Josephine (Darveaux) Mosman (1920–1975); Louis Paul Mosman (1923–2017); Harriet Mosman (1927–1928)

Tony Bernard Mosman (born Anton Bernard Mosman) (1886–1985) was an American artist from Carroll, Iowa, United States. He produced landscape, still-life, and portrait paintings in oil, watercolor, pastel and acrylic. He was a published poet in the Atlantic Monthly and has also written a novel and a series of short stories.

== Background ==
Mosman was born in 1886 in Carroll, Iowa, to Antonius Albertus Mosman (1856–1928) and Helena “Lena” Pittmann (or Puttmann)(1863–1956). He was one of eight children. He married Barbara Mary Wille (1886–1954) on June 3, 1913. He married a second time, on June 14, 1958, to Margaret Nees (1896–1989). He served as a Private of the National Guard in Carroll for 1 1/2 years. Mosman and Barbara had four children: Freda Barbara (Mosman) Stevens (1914–1993), Grace Josephine (Mosman) Darveaux (1920–1975), Louis Paul Mosman (1923–2017) and Harriet Mosman (1927–1928).

Mosman owned and operated the Carroll Paint Shop for thirty years, but he considered that being an artist was his true profession. As a "widely recognized Western Iowa artist" he twice exhibited his paintings in Omaha, Nebraska at the Jocelyn Memorial Art Museum. He also exhibited art at the Iowa State Fair in Des Moines, and at art centers of: Sioux City, Iowa; Des Moines, Iowa; Denver, Iowa; Ames, Iowa; and Fort Dodge, Iowa.

In 1938, after submitting works to a national contest judged by Eleanor Roosevelt, he was asked to donate the paintings to a traveling exhibition that would go all over the country. He was appointed the Carroll committeeman for an art exhibit at Cornell College. In 1965, he exhibited 41 paintings in the Carroll County State Bank. and in the Carroll Public Library in 1980. It was reported in 1965 that he had "over 1,000 paintings to his credit and some have brought as much as $150 at exhibitions." He sold about 30 of his paintings in 1979 in Sarasota and Tampa, Florida; Tucson, Arizona; San Francisco, California; and New York, New York.

He died of a stroke on August 16, 1985, at Carroll, Iowa, and is buried at Mount Olivet Cemetery, Carroll, Iowa.
