= James Warren (engineer) =

British engineer

James Warren (1806–1908) was a British engineer who, around 1848 to 1907 (along with Willoughby Monzoni), patented the Warren-style truss bridge and girder design. This bridge design is mainly constructed by equilateral triangles which can carry both tension and compression. The first suspension bridge to utilise a Warren truss in its design was the Manhattan Bridge in New York City.

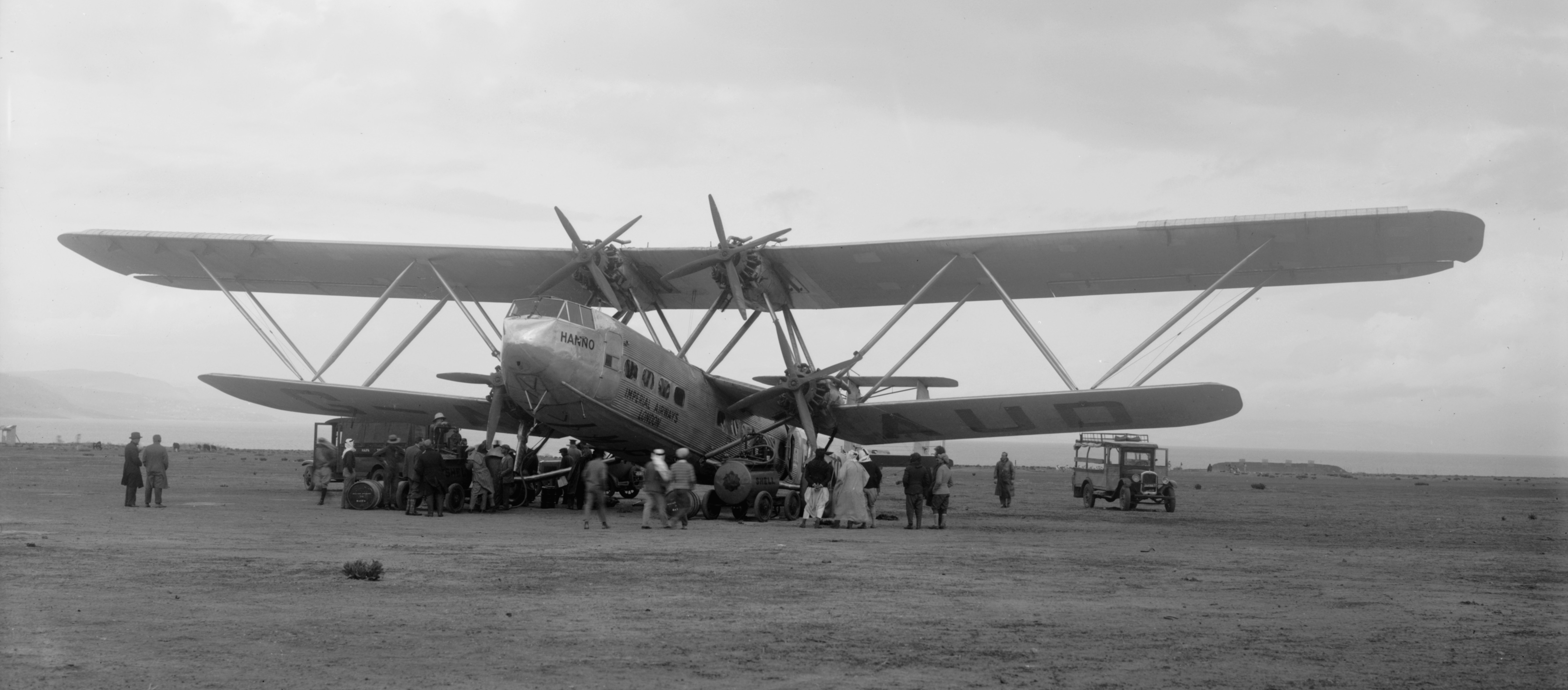
A Handley Page H.P.42 showing the Warren Truss diagonal interplane struts

The Warren truss design was used in early aviation when biplanes were dominant, the alternating diagonal truss being used for the interplane struts in aircraft such as the Handley Page H.P.42 airliner and the Fiat CR.42 fighter. The Warren truss is one of the most widely used and known bridge styles worldwide.
