= Sargent Bridge =

- Formerly listed on the U.S. National Register of Historic Places
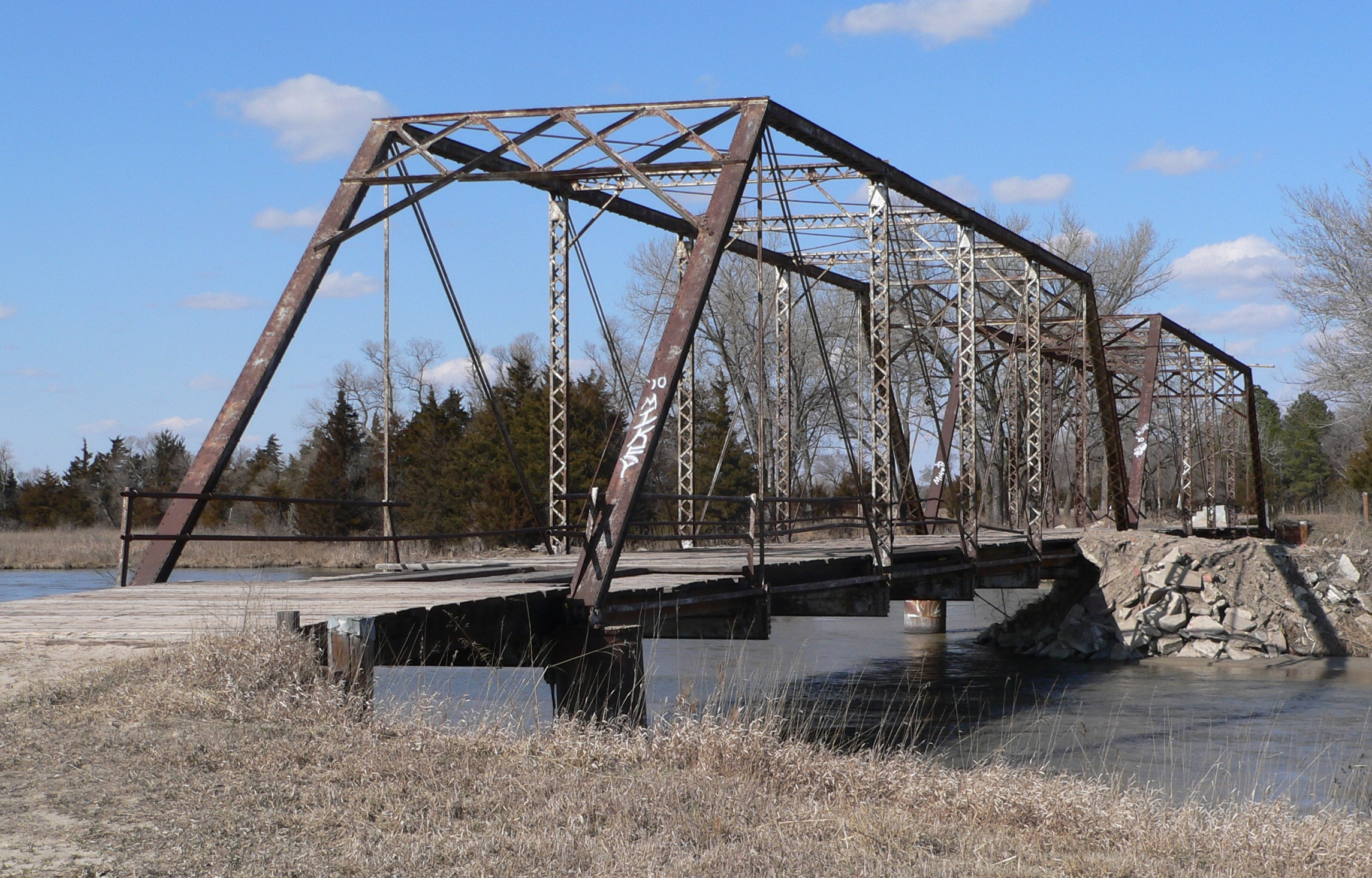
- Sargent Bridge across the Middle Loup River south of Sargent, Nebraska

- Location within Nebraska Location within the United States
- Location: Dawson St. over the Middle Loup River, 1 mile south of Sargent
- Coordinates: 41°37′38″N 99°22′18.0″W
- Built: 1909
- Built by: Standard Bridge Company
- Architectural style: Pratt through truss
- Demolished: 2019
- MPS: Highway Bridges in Nebraska MPS
- NRHP reference No.: 92000740

Significant dates
- Added to NRHP: June 29, 1992
- Removed from NRHP: March 13, 2020

Sargent Bridge was a Pratt through truss steel bridge that spanned the Middle Loup River near Sargent, Nebraska. In 1992, it was listed in the National Register of Historic Places, as one of the few remaining steel truss bridges constructed in Nebraska during the early 20th century. It was destroyed by flooding in 2019, and was delisted in 2020.

== Description ==
The bridge was a six-panel, Pratt through truss steel bridge, with two 120-foot (37 m) spans. When completed in 1909, it was reported to be 242 feet (74 m) long; but on the National Register of Historic Places Registration Form, the reported total length was 136 feet (41 m). The bridge width was 18 feet (5.5 m).

== History and significance ==
On March 19, 1908, the Custer County, Nebraska supervisors unanimously approved the construction of the Sargent Bridge. At that time, there was a wooden bridge over the river that was expensive to maintain. Building a steel bridge was viewed as more expensive by the board of supervisors, but in the long run they believed that it would save money on maintenance.

Work began on the bridge on November 19, 1908. However, construction on the bridge had been delayed and the starting date was approximately one month after its planned finish. The Standard Bridge Company was commissioned to build the bridge and they were under bond to build the bridge by October 13, 1908, but according to the bond they were only liable for damages and additional expenses if the bridge was not built on time. The bridge was finally completed during the first week of January, 1909, and it was inspected and approved by the county bridge committee.

This was the first steel bridge built in Custer County. Nebraska state engineers had estimated the cost at $10,000 ($358,333 today) and the original cost of the bridge by the county supervisors was $5,500 ($197,083 today). However, because of the quicksand in the river bed, bridge supports were sunk 10 feet (3.0 m) deeper at an additional cost of $1,500 ($53,750 today), which brought the total cost of the bridge to about $7,000 ($250,833 today).

In 1920, the Custer County board of supervisors asked the Nebraska state highway authorities to rebuild the Sargent Bridge to meet state and federal specifications. Funds were never appropriated to rebuild the bridge, but it was subsequently incorporated into US Highway 183. In 1960, the route of the highway was moved a short distance to the east, and the 1909 bridge was closed to public traffic. It was subsequently acquired by the Middle Loup Irrigation District.

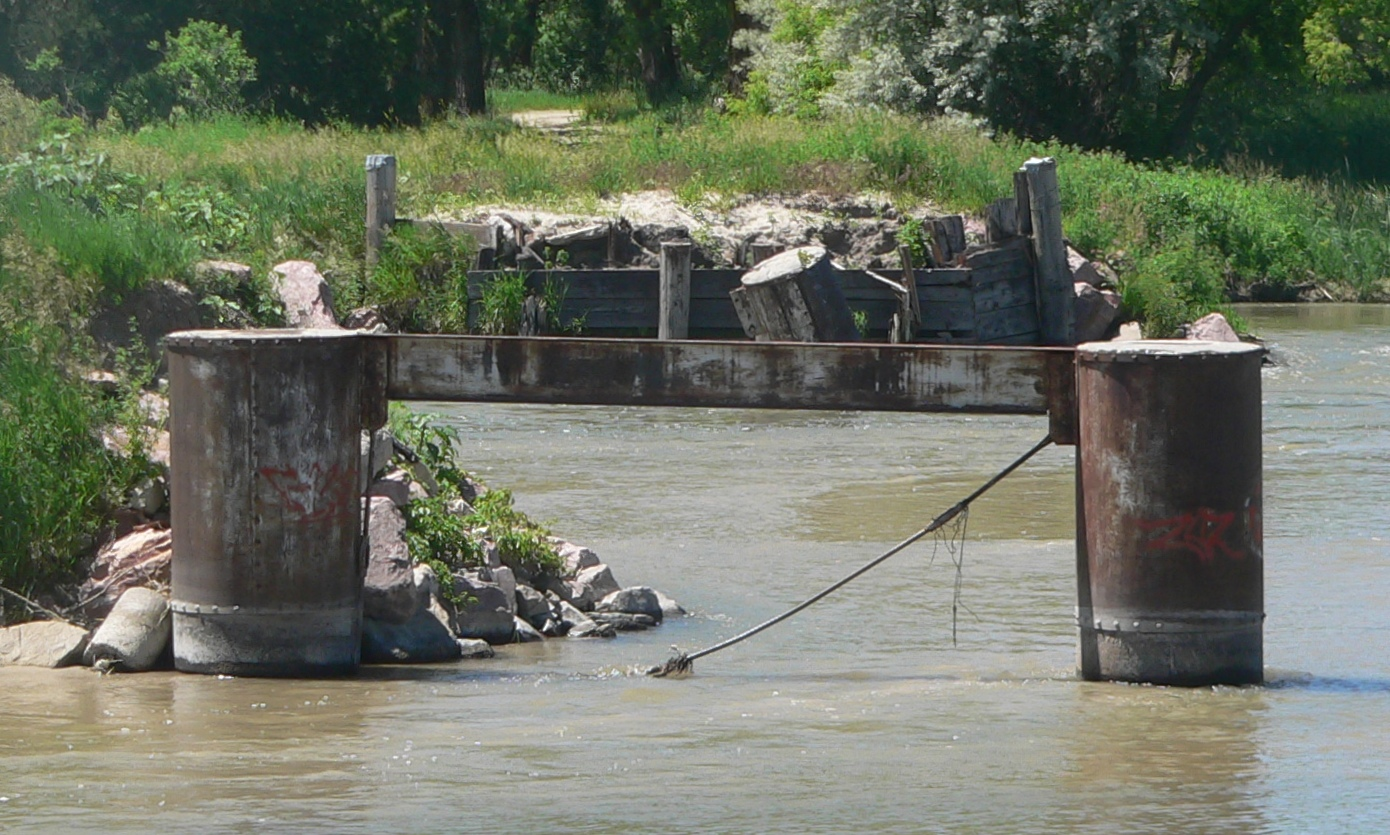
Remains of bridge in 2019: central piling, with south abutment in background

In 1992, the bridge was listed in the National Register of Historic Places, as one of only a few multiple-span steel truss bridges constructed in the early 20th century that were still extant in Nebraska. At that time, the east web of the north truss had broken, but the bridge was still structurally sound, and providing non-public access to a diversion dam.

In March 2019, ice chunks carried by heavy flooding in the river destroyed the bridge. The north span was carried about 80 yards downstream, where it caught on the diversion dam; one end of the south span was pushed off a piling, and the span was twisted some 45 degrees. It was deemed necessary to remove the remains of the bridge from the river, lest future flooding carry them downstream to damage the current Highway 183 bridge.
