= Carl O. Wegner =

American lawyer

Carl O. Wegner (December 27, 1897 – June 13, 1986) was an American politician and lawyer.

Wegner was born in Carroll, Iowa and received his bachelor's degree from Morningside College in Sioux City, Iowa. He served in the United States Army during World War I. Wegner received his law degree from the University of Minnesota Law School in 1927 and was admitted to the Minnesota bar. He lived in Minneapolis, Minnesota with his wife and family and practiced law in Minneapolis. Wegner served in the Minnesota House of Representatives from 1943 to 1952 and in 1955 and 1956. Wegner died from complications involving diabetes at his home in Minneapolis, Minnesota.
