= 1960 Minneapolis Lakers cornfield landing =

Aircraft incident in the US

Accident
- Date: January 18, 1960
- Summary: Forced landing
- Site: Carroll, Iowa, U.S.; 42.0843°N 94.8570°W

Aircraft
- Aircraft type: Douglas DC-3
- Flight origin: St. Louis, Missouri, U.S.
- Destination: Minneapolis, Minnesota, U.S.
- Occupants: 23
- Passengers: 20
- Crew: 3
- Fatalities: 0
- Injuries: 0

The 1960 Minneapolis Lakers cornfield landing was an aircraft incident where a Douglas DC-3 carrying 23 people, including the coach and players of the Minneapolis Lakers, made an emergency landing in an Iowa cornfield during a snowstorm after having gotten lost due to an electrical malfunction and poor weather. The incident has been described as the closest the United States has ever come to losing a professional sports team.

Several months after the incident, Lakers owner Bob Short moved the franchise to Los Angeles.

== Incident ==
After a game against the St. Louis Hawks, the aircraft took off from St. Louis at around 8:30pm on January 17, after having been delayed for two hours because of weather. About 10 minutes into the flight, the plane suffered an electrical malfunction which took out the plane's heater, lighting, defroster, radio, fuel gauge, and compass amongst others. Flying blind, the pilots decided it was too dangerous to return to the busy St. Louis airport and headed for Minneapolis. Without the plane's navigational equipment, it soon got lost. Around four hours afterward, and low on fuel, the crew spotted the town of Carroll, Iowa. After circling the town a few times, looking for an airport, the pilots successfully made an emergency landing in a nearby cornfield at around 1:30am on January 18.

== Passengers and crew ==
The plane was crewed by three people. It also carried 20 passengers, including coach Jim Pollard and players Elgin Baylor, Hot Rod Hundley and Bobby Leonard as well as several other players, team personnel, family members and fans.
