= Armour Creameries Poultry House =

- U.S. National Register of Historic Places
- Location within Iowa Location within the United States
- Location: 218 5th Ave. S. Coon Rapids, Iowa
- Coordinates: 41°52′08.5″N 94°40′40″W
- Area: less than one acre
- Built: 1928
- NRHP reference No.: 11000815
- Added to NRHP: November 18, 2011

The Armour Creameries Poultry House, also known as the Armour warehouse and the Garst Company warehouse, is a historic building located in Coon Rapids, Iowa, United States. Jens Jensen sold his regional creamery business to Armour and Company in June 1928. That facility, which is no longer extant, was located on the north side of the central business district. By August, Armour was constructing a new building along the Chicago, Milwaukee, St. Paul and Pacific Railroad tracks on the south side of business district. By doing so Armour connected Coon Rapids with larger markets by upgrading one of its industries, bringing in outside professionals to operate it, bringing new workers to expand the town, and sending its products out to the larger markets. Armour continued operating this facility into the late 1950s. The building was bought by the Garst Seed Company, who used it as a warehouse. The building was listed on the National Register of Historic Places in 2011.
