= Carnegie Library Building (Carroll, Iowa) =

- U.S. National Register of Historic Places
- Location within Iowa Location within the United States
- Location: 125 E. 6th St. Carroll, Iowa
- Coordinates: 42°3′58″N 94°51′58″W
- Area: less than one acre
- Built: 1905
- Architect: Thomas R. Kimball
- Architectural style: Prairie School
- MPS: Public Library Buildings in Iowa TR
- NRHP reference No.: 76000739
- Added to NRHP: November 13, 1976

The Carnegie Library Building in Carroll, Iowa, United States, is a building from 1905. The 60-by-38.5-foot (18.3 by 11.7 m) structure was designed in the Prairie School style by Omaha architect Thomas R. Kimball. The Carnegie Corporation of New York had accepted Carroll's application for a grant for $10,000 on February 12, 1903. It was listed on the National Register of Historic Places in 1976.

The library is now home to the Carroll County Historical Museum, which is operated by the Carroll Historical Society.
