= Carroll station (Chicago & Northwestern Railroad) =

- Chicago & Northwestern Passenger Depot and Baggage Room-Carroll
- U.S. National Register of Historic Places
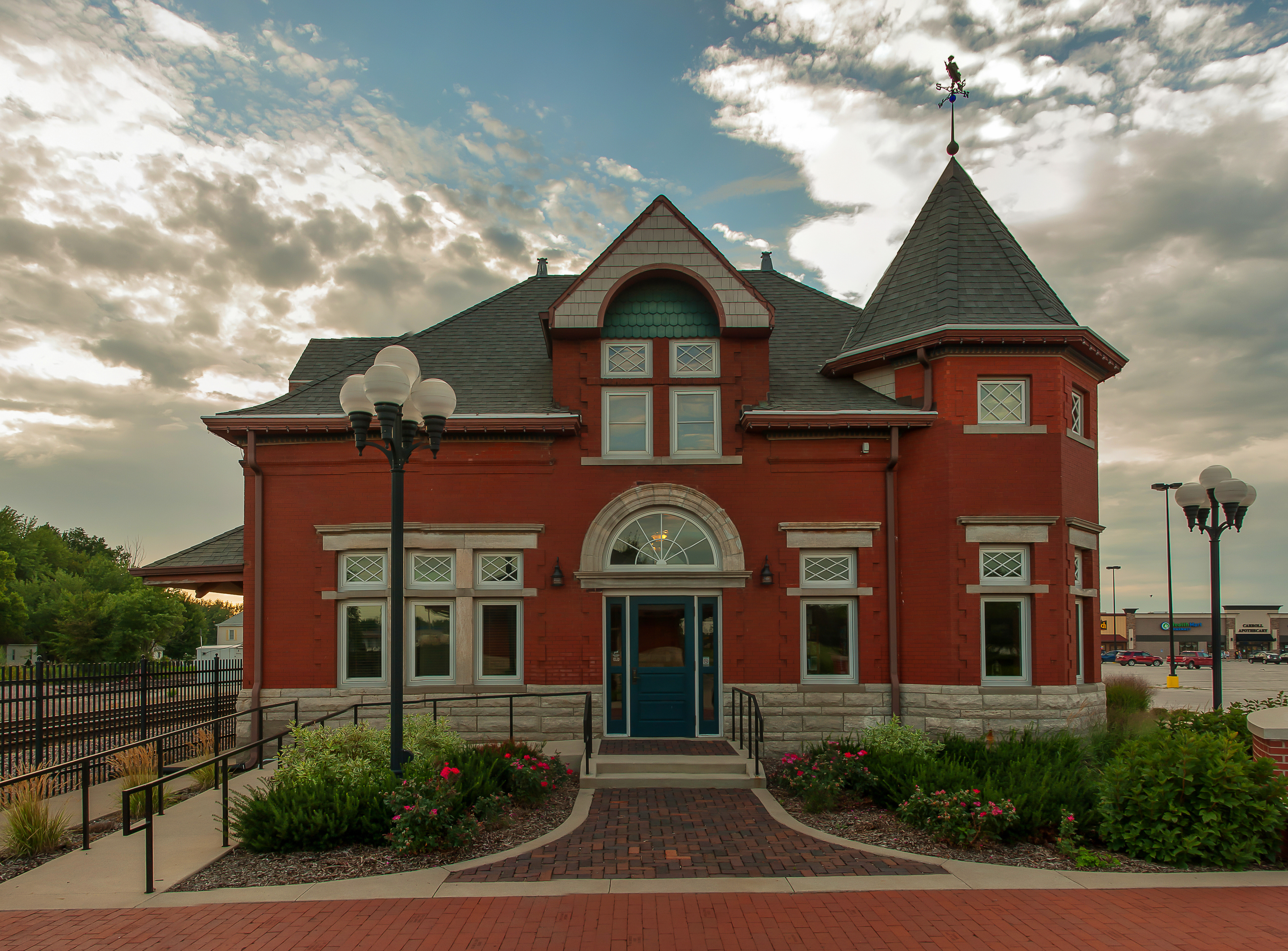

- Location within Iowa Location within the United States
- Location: Junction of N. West and W. 5th Sts., Carroll, Iowa
- Coordinates: 42°03′56″N 94°52′21″W
- Area: less than one acre
- Built: 1896
- Architect: Charles Sumner Frost
- Architectural style: Romanesque Revival
- MPS: Advent & Development of Railroads in Iowa MPS
- NRHP reference No.: 90001302
- Added to NRHP: September 6, 1990

Carroll station is a historic depot building located in Carroll, Iowa, United States. It is an example of a replacement station built along its Iowa mainline by the Chicago and North Western Railway (CNW) in 1896. It replaced a two-story, frame, combination station that was first built in 1867 by its predecessor line, the Cedar Rapids and Missouri River Railroad. That building had experienced two fires. The CNW had built two branch lines from Carroll in 1877 and 1880, which increased business and necessitated a larger depot. The Carroll Express Building was also built across the street for further railroad use. A separate wooden freight house had been built in 1888. Chicago architect Charles Sumner Frost designed this station in the Romanesque Revival style. The baggage room is separated from the depot by a breezeway. Frost designed at least 15 stations for the CNW in Iowa and Nebraska and another 14 in the Chicago area. The building represents the prosperity of the line during the Golden Age of Railroads.

Passenger service ended here in 1959, and the building was used by the railroad for storage for years after that. The building was listed on the National Register of Historic Places in 1990. At that time efforts to restore the building began. Exterior renovations were completed in 2004, followed by the interior. Once the renovations were complete, the building has housed the local chamber of commerce.

Preceding station	Chicago and North Western Railway	Following station
Arcadia toward Omaha	Main Line	Glidden toward Chicago
Halbur toward Audubon	Audubon – Carroll	Terminus
Halbur toward Harlan	Harlan – Carroll	Terminus
Maple River toward Sioux City	Sioux City – Carroll	Terminus
