= Warren truss =

Type of structural truss based upon equilateral triangles

Warren truss – some of the diagonals are under compression and some under tension.

In structural engineering, a Warren truss or equilateral truss is a type of truss employing a weight-saving design based on equilateral triangles. It is named after the British engineer James Warren, who patented it in 1848.

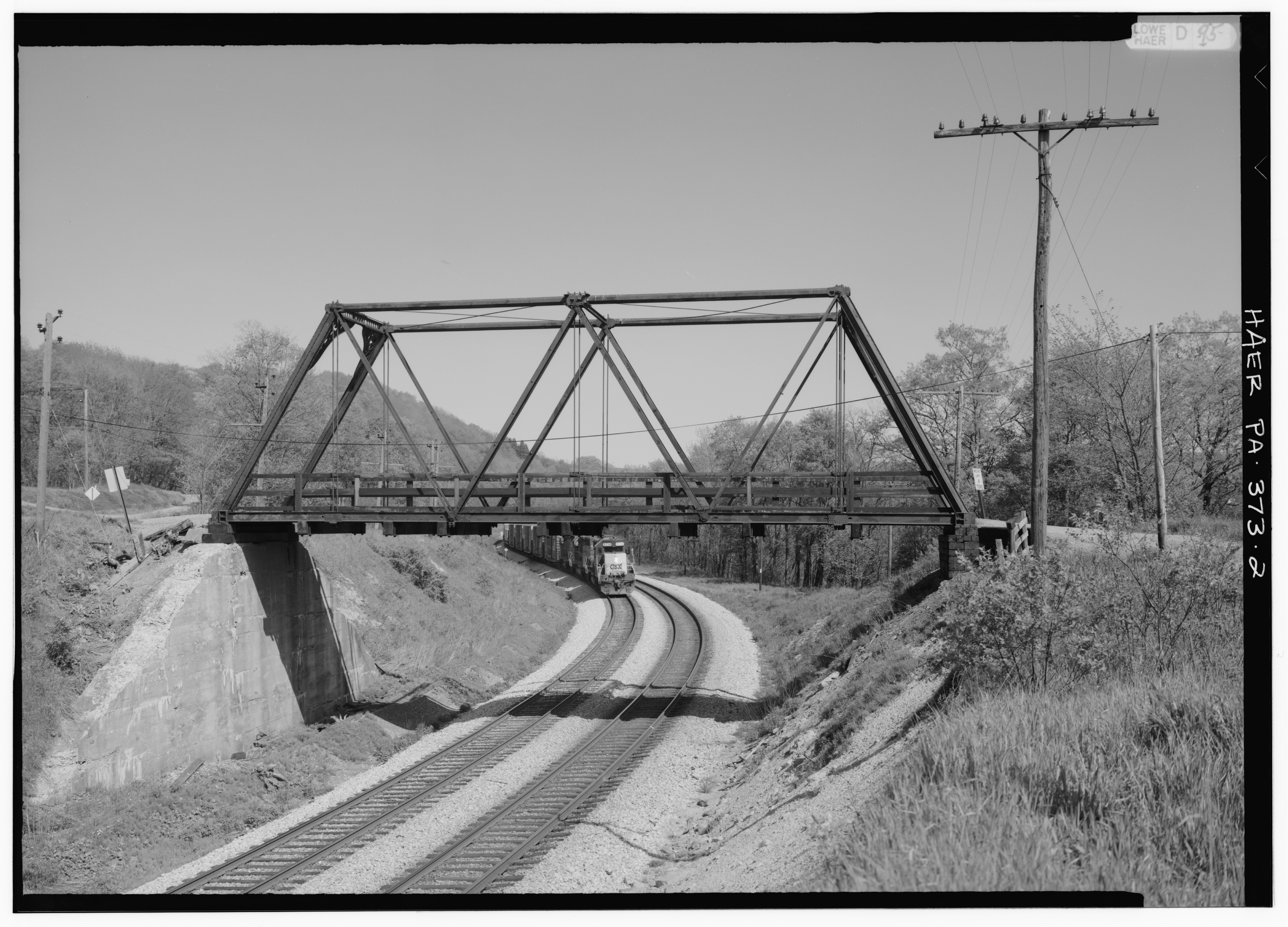
Wills Creek Bollman Bridge, a short Warren truss bridge of 1871

== Origins ==
It was patented in 1848 by its designers, British engineer James Warren and Willoughby Theobald Monzani.

== Truss ==
The Warren truss consists of longitudinal members joined only by angled cross-members, forming alternately inverted equilateral triangle-shaped spaces along its length. This gives a pure truss: each individual strut, beam, or tie is only subject to tension or compression forces, there are no bending or torsional forces on them.

Loads on the diagonals alternate between compression and tension (approaching the centre), with no vertical elements, while elements near the centre must support both tension and compression in response to live loads. This configuration combines strength with economy of materials and can therefore be relatively light. The girders being of equal length, it is ideal for use in prefabricated modular bridges.

It is an improvement over the Neville truss in which the elements form isosceles triangles.

A variant of the Warren truss has additional vertical members within the triangles. These are used when the lengths of the upper horizontal members would otherwise become so long as to present a risk of buckling (Note: Column theory shows that the risk of buckling increases with length, not merely compressive load.) These verticals do not carry a large proportion of the truss loads; they act mostly to stabilise the horizontal members against breaking down.

== Bridges ==
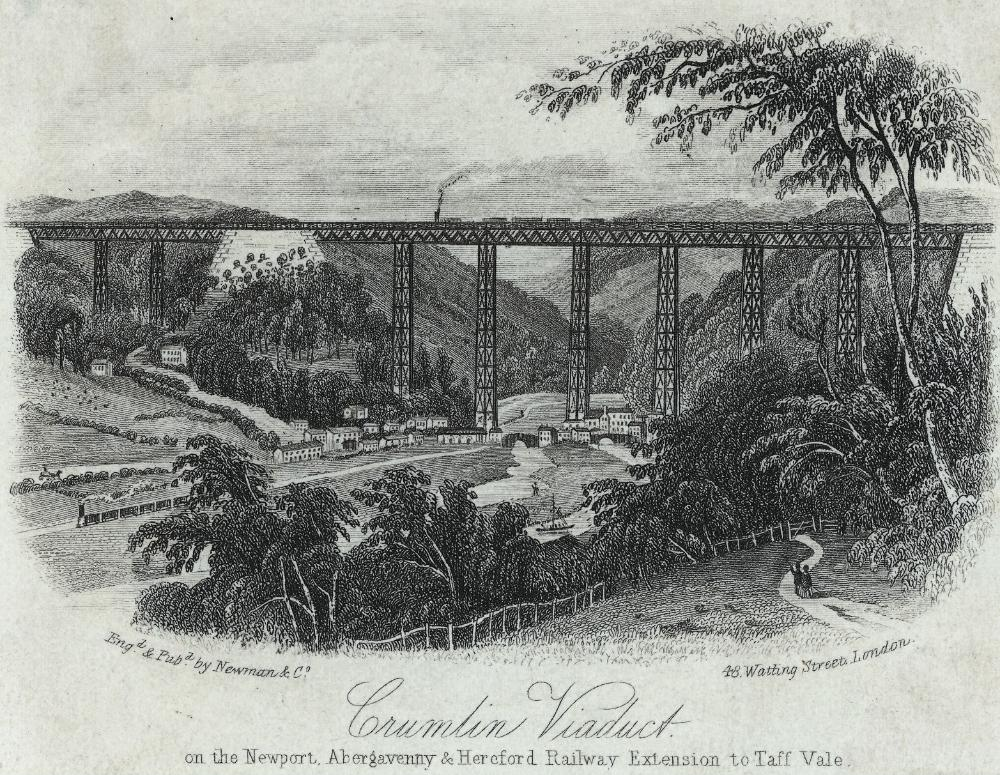
Crumlin Viaduct, 1857, an important early use of the Warren truss

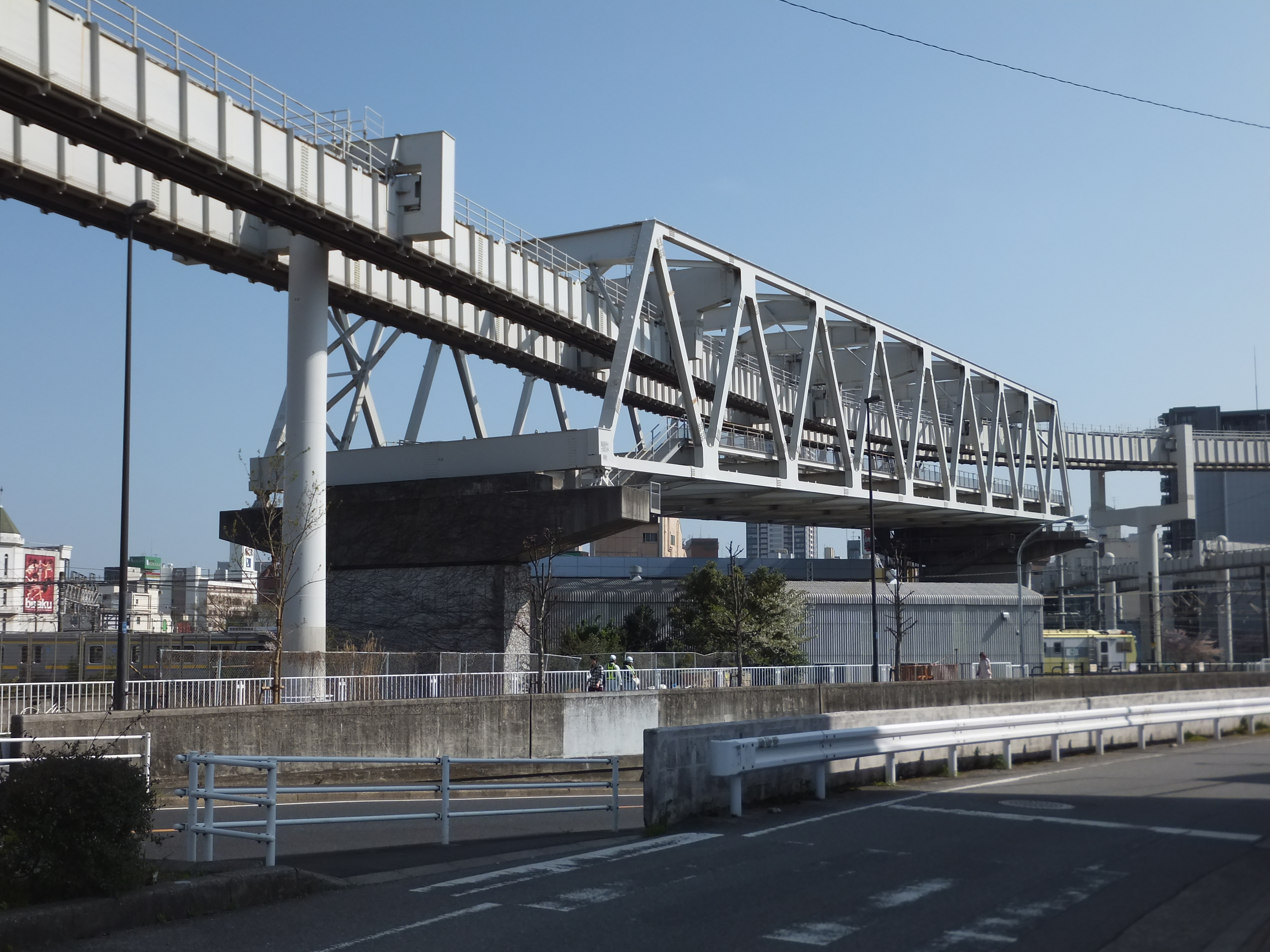
Chiba Urban Monorail, Japan

== Architecture ==
The Warren truss is a prominent structural feature in hundreds of hastily constructed aircraft hangars in WW2. In the early parts of the war, the British and Canadian government formed an agreement known as the British Commonwealth Air Training Plan which used newly constructed airbases in Canada to train aircrew needed to sustain emerging air forces. Hundreds of airfields, aprons, taxiways and ground installations were constructed all across Canada. Two characteristic features were a triangle runway layout and hangars built from virgin British Columbia timbers with Warren truss configuration roofs. Many still remain in service.

== Aircraft ==
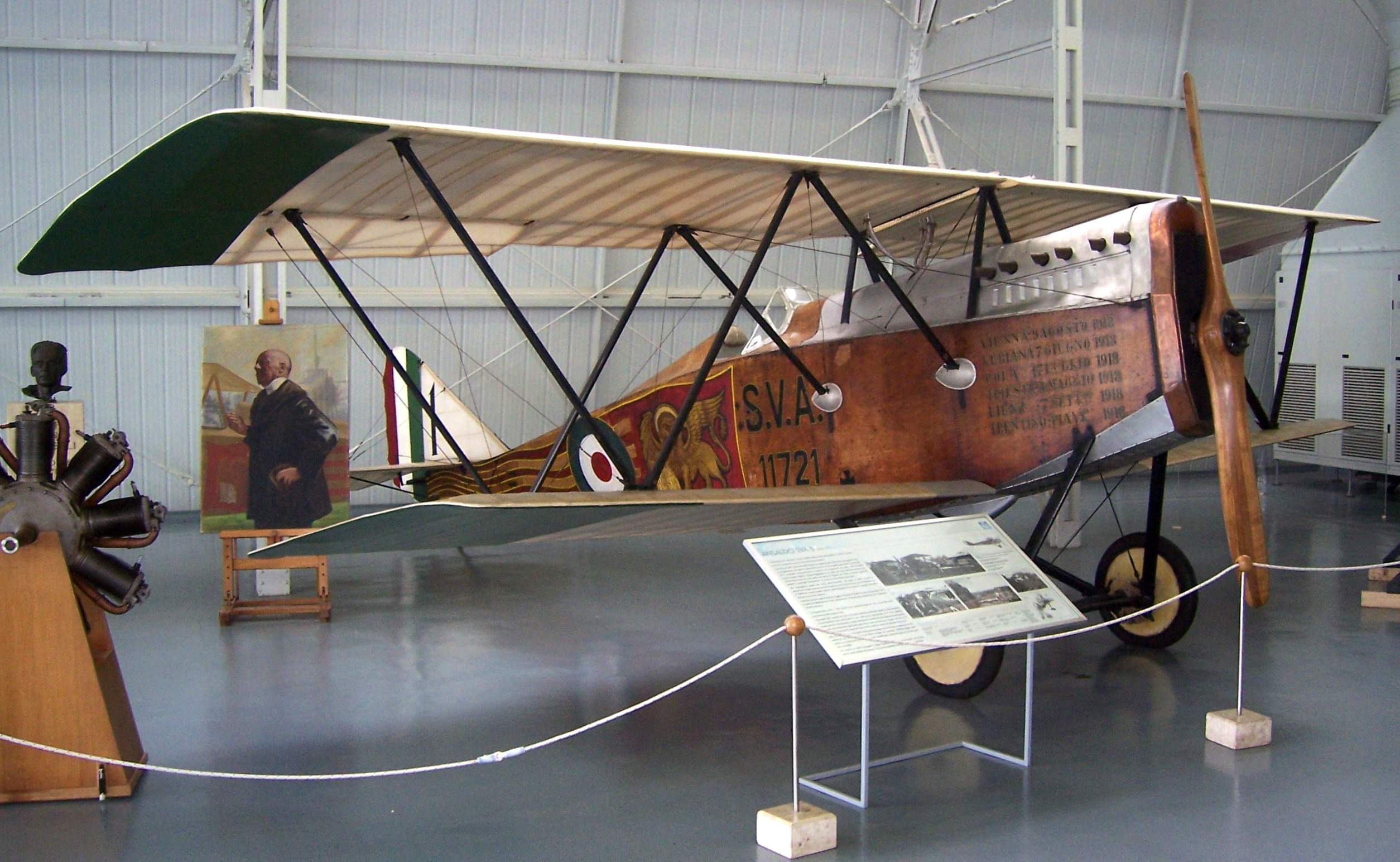
A preserved Ansaldo SVA, with Warren truss bracing between its wings

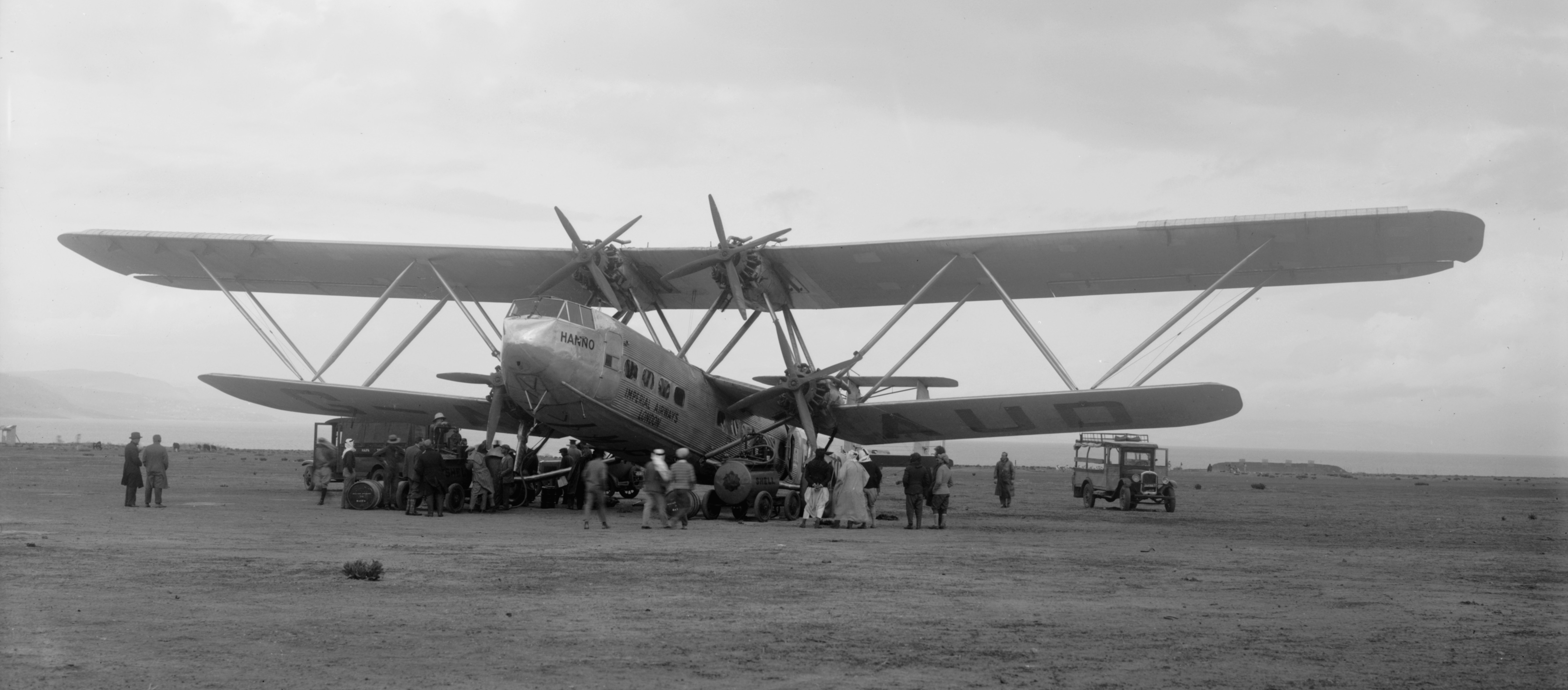
A Handley Page H.P.42 shows off its interplane trusses.

Warren truss construction has also been used in airframe design and construction, for substantial numbers of aircraft designs.

An early use was for the interplane wing struts on some biplanes. The Italian World War I Ansaldo SVA series of fast reconnaissance biplanes were among the fastest aircraft of their era, while the Handley Page H.P.42 was a successful airliner of the late 1920s and the Fiat CR.42 Falco Falco fighter remained in service until World War II.

The Warren truss is also sometimes used for fuselage frames, such as in the Piper J-3 Cub and Hawker Hurricane.
