= Carroll, Iowa =

- City
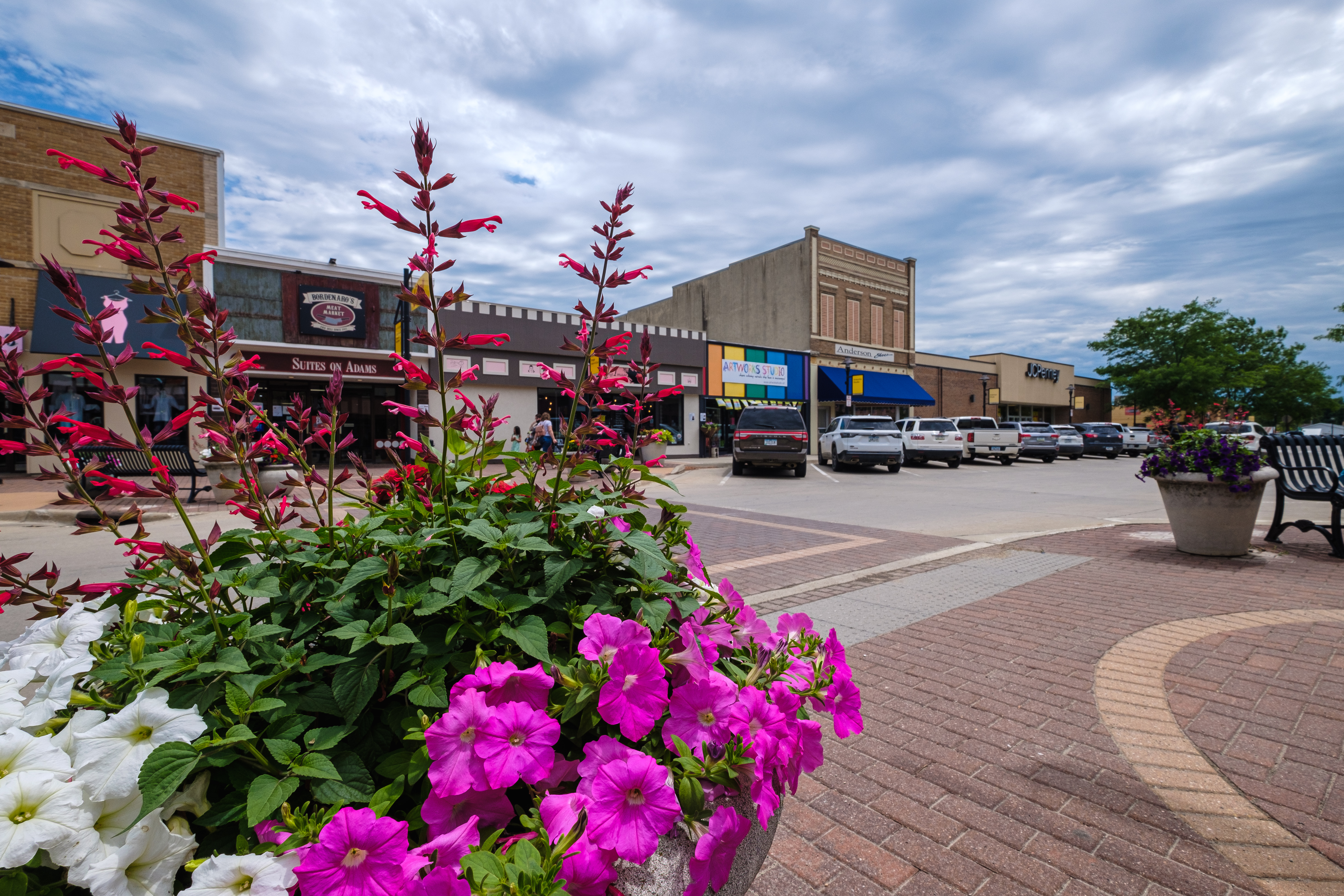
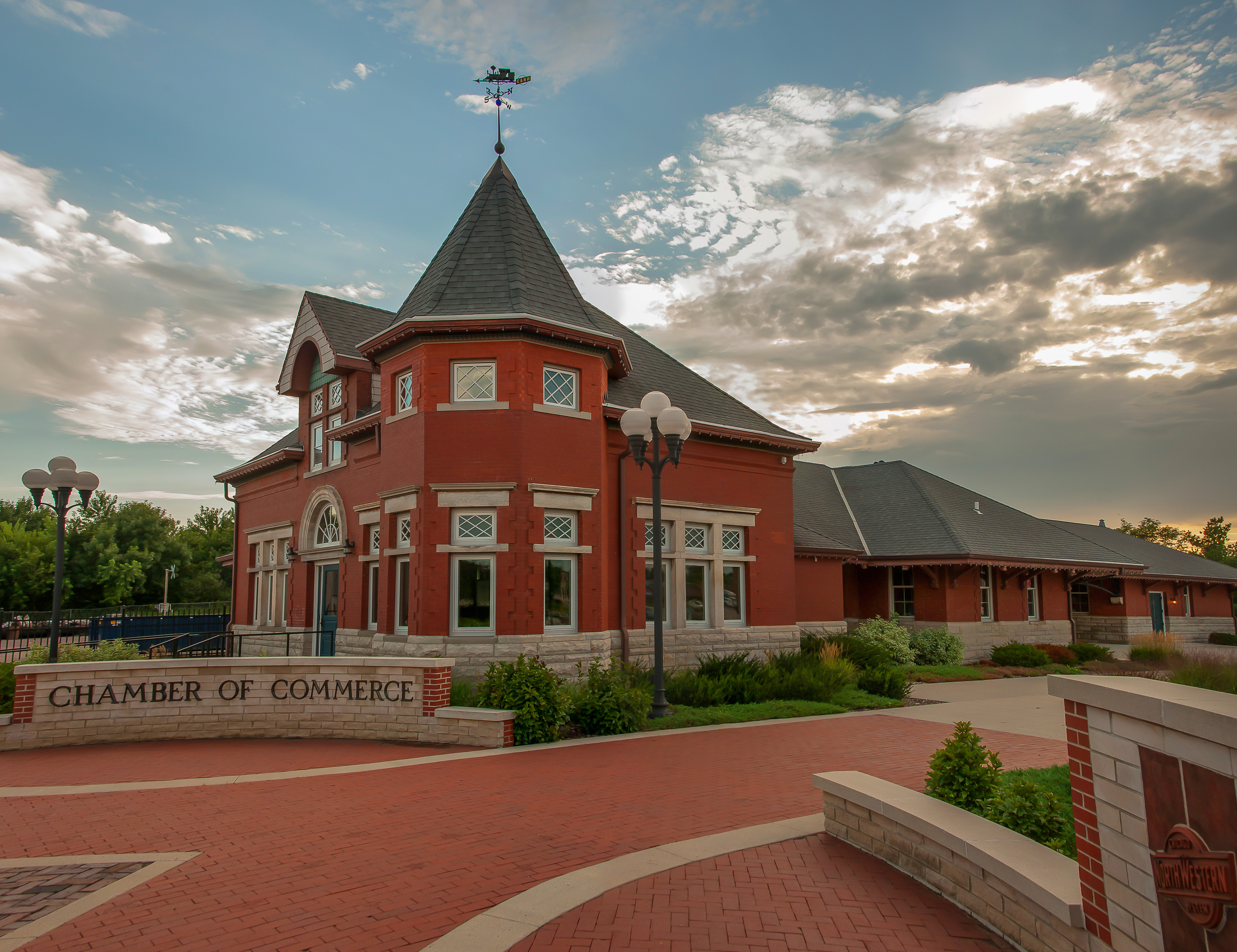
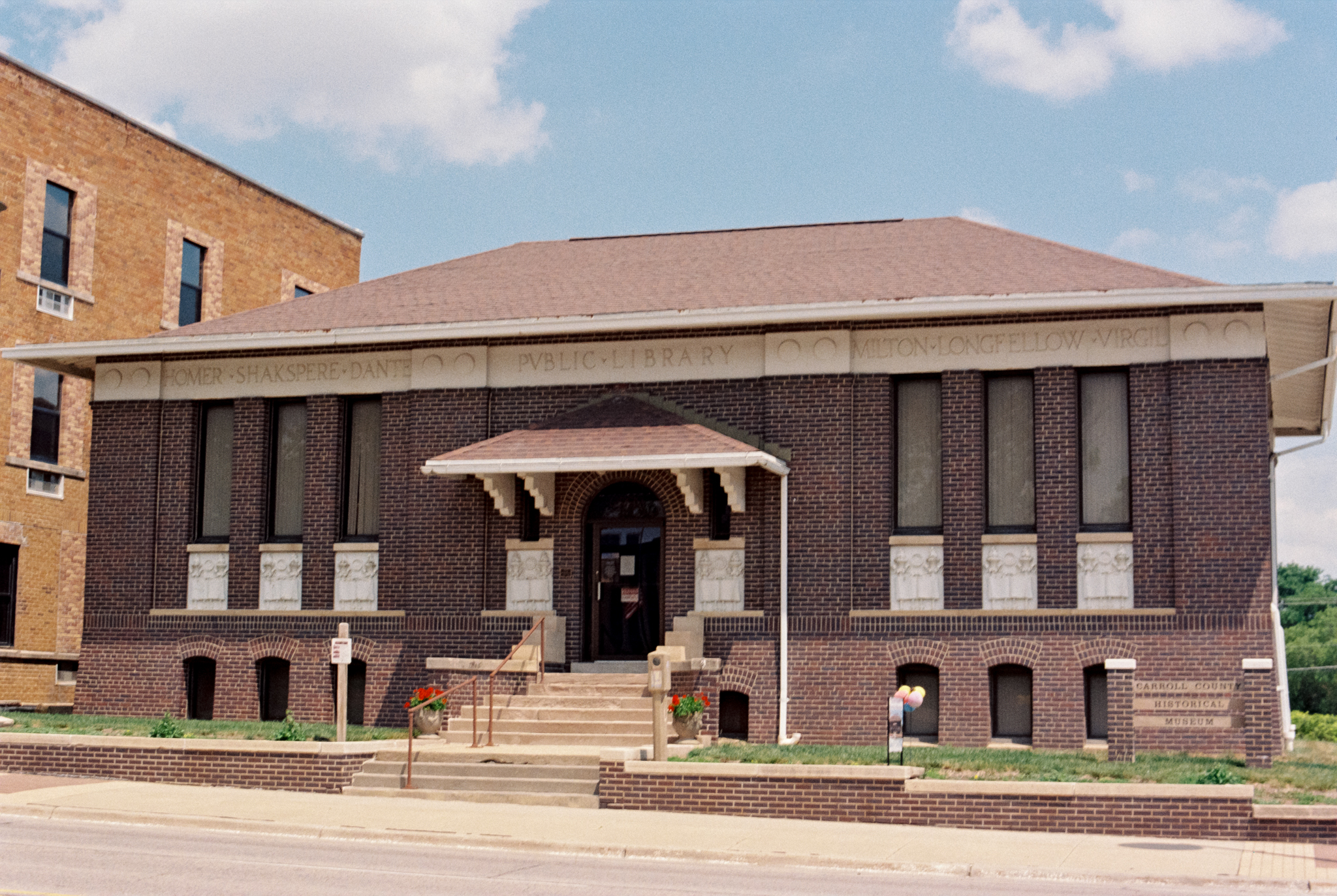
- Downtown Carroll Carroll Chamber of Commerce Carroll County Historical Society
- Motto: "Get Involved. Get Results."
- Location of Carroll, Iowa
- Coordinates: 42°04′23″N 94°52′29″W
- Country: United States
- State: Iowa
- County: Carroll
- Named for: Charles Carroll of Carrollton

Area
  - Total: 5.74 sq mi (14.86 km^{2})
  - Land: 5.74 sq mi (14.86 km^{2})
  - Water: 0 sq mi (0.00 km^{2})
- Elevation: 1,276 ft (389 m)

Population (2020)
  - Total: 10,321
  - Density: 1,798.3/sq mi (694.34/km^{2})
- Time zone: UTC−6 (Central (CST))
  - Summer (DST): UTC−5 (CDT)
- ZIP code: 51401
- Area code: 712
- FIPS code: 19-11080
- GNIS feature ID: 467532
- Website: www.cityofcarroll.com

Carroll is a city in, and the county seat of, Carroll County, Iowa, United States, along the Middle Raccoon River. The population was 10,321 in the 2020 census.

== History ==
Carroll was laid out in 1867. It took its name from Carroll County, which was named in honor of Charles Carroll of Carrollton, Maryland. He was the only Roman Catholic to sign the Declaration of Independence.

In 1869, the centrally located railroad town of Carroll City was selected as the county seat, replacing, with some protest, Carrollton. Later a $4,000 courthouse was constructed on the town square. This building was used until it burned to the ground in 1886. The vaults and records were undamaged, however, and moved to temporary housing in the Joyce Building and Drees' Music Hall.

The following winter a $40,000 bond issue was approved toward the construction of a new, permanent courthouse. The stone-and-brick building was built on the northwest corner of the square (the parking lot of the current courthouse). The courthouse, complete with a clock-tower, was used for more than three-quarters of a century, then replaced by a modern-looking building in 1965.

A $750,000 bond issue was used to construct and equip the new courthouse. This building was officially dedicated on September 24, 1966. The highlight of the dedication ceremony was the opening of the boxes sealed in the cornerstone of the old courthouse. The bell from the previous courthouse clock tower sits on the courthouse grounds.

The town was the site of the 1960 Minneapolis Lakers cornfield landing. A Douglas DC-3 carrying the coach and players of the Minneapolis Lakers, made an emergency landing in a cornfield during a snowstorm after having got lost due to an electrical malfunction and poor weather.

== Geography ==
According to the United States Census Bureau, the city has a total area of 5.69 square miles (14.74 km^{2}), all land.

=== Climate ===
According to the Köppen Climate Classification system, Carroll has a hot-summer humid continental climate, abbreviated "Dfa" on climate maps.

Climate data for Carroll, Iowa (1991–2020 normals, extremes 1893–present)
Month	Jan	Feb	Mar	Apr	May	Jun	Jul	Aug	Sep	Oct	Nov	Dec	Year
Record high °F (°C)	68 (20)	72 (22)	88 (31)	94 (34)	107 (42)	105 (41)	112 (44)	112 (44)	103 (39)	94 (34)	79 (26)	71 (22)	112 (44)
Mean maximum °F (°C)	50.3 (10.2)	56.5 (13.6)	72.1 (22.3)	83.4 (28.6)	89.5 (31.9)	93.3 (34.1)	94.2 (34.6)	92.8 (33.8)	90.3 (32.4)	84.1 (28.9)	68.5 (20.3)	54.6 (12.6)	96.1 (35.6)
Mean daily maximum °F (°C)	27.9 (−2.3)	32.8 (0.4)	46.2 (7.9)	59.9 (15.5)	71.1 (21.7)	81.3 (27.4)	84.3 (29.1)	82.2 (27.9)	76.3 (24.6)	62.9 (17.2)	46.4 (8.0)	33.1 (0.6)	58.7 (14.8)
Daily mean °F (°C)	19.1 (−7.2)	23.5 (−4.7)	35.7 (2.1)	48.0 (8.9)	60.1 (15.6)	70.7 (21.5)	74.1 (23.4)	71.7 (22.1)	64.0 (17.8)	51.2 (10.7)	36.6 (2.6)	24.6 (−4.1)	48.3 (9.1)
Mean daily minimum °F (°C)	10.3 (−12.1)	14.2 (−9.9)	25.3 (−3.7)	36.1 (2.3)	49.2 (9.6)	60.0 (15.6)	63.9 (17.7)	61.2 (16.2)	51.8 (11.0)	39.5 (4.2)	26.7 (−2.9)	16.1 (−8.8)	37.9 (3.3)
Mean minimum °F (°C)	−11.7 (−24.3)	−6.7 (−21.5)	4.5 (−15.3)	20.5 (−6.4)	33.7 (0.9)	46.5 (8.1)	51.9 (11.1)	50.1 (10.1)	35.6 (2.0)	22.3 (−5.4)	9.3 (−12.6)	−4.4 (−20.2)	−14.5 (−25.8)
Record low °F (°C)	−40 (−40)	−33 (−36)	−28 (−33)	3 (−16)	18 (−8)	33 (1)	39 (4)	34 (1)	19 (−7)	1 (−17)	−12 (−24)	−26 (−32)	−40 (−40)
Average precipitation inches (mm)	0.90 (23)	1.11 (28)	1.87 (47)	3.35 (85)	4.49 (114)	5.12 (130)	4.36 (111)	4.06 (103)	2.95 (75)	2.68 (68)	1.44 (37)	1.38 (35)	33.71 (856)
Average snowfall inches (cm)	5.7 (14)	6.8 (17)	5.5 (14)	2.1 (5.3)	0.0 (0.0)	0.0 (0.0)	0.0 (0.0)	0.0 (0.0)	0.0 (0.0)	0.3 (0.76)	2.6 (6.6)	6.2 (16)	29.2 (74)
Average precipitation days (≥ 0.01 in)	6.5	6.6	7.9	10.6	12.6	12.1	10.0	9.5	8.5	8.5	5.8	6.9	105.5
Average snowy days (≥ 0.1 in)	3.9	3.6	2.4	1.0	0.0	0.0	0.0	0.0	0.0	0.1	1.5	4.4	16.9
Source 1: NOAA (snow 1981–2010)
Source 2: National Weather Service

== Demographics ==
Historical population
Census	Pop.	Note	%±
1870	384		—
1880	1,385		260.7%
1890	2,448		76.8%
1900	2,882		17.7%
1910	3,546		23.0%
1920	4,254		20.0%
1930	4,691		10.3%
1940	5,389		14.9%
1950	6,231		15.6%
1960	7,682		23.3%
1970	8,716		13.5%
1980	9,705		11.3%
1990	9,579		−1.3%
2000	10,106		5.5%
2010	10,103		0.0%
2020	10,321		2.2%
U.S. Decennial Census

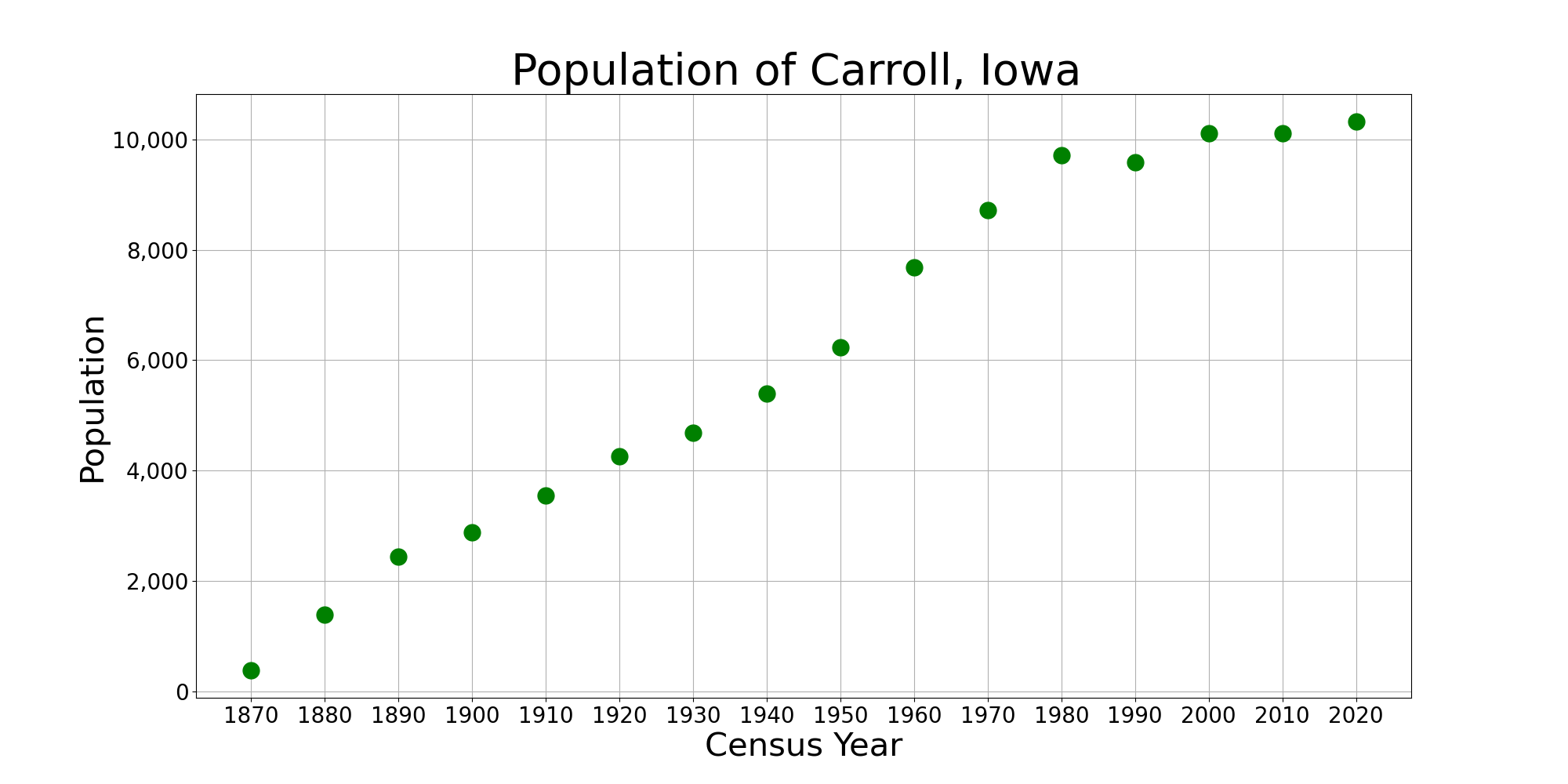
The population of Carroll, Iowa from US census data

=== 2020 census ===
As of the 2020 census, Carroll had a population of 10,321 people, with 4,468 households and 2,596 families residing in the city. The population density was 1,798.3 inhabitants per square mile (694.3/km^{2}). There were 4,825 housing units at an average density of 840.7 per square mile (324.6/km^{2}).

The median age was 42.5 years. 23.4% of residents were under the age of 18 and 22.3% were 65 years of age or older. 25.7% of residents were under the age of 20; 4.4% were from 20 to 24; 22.8% were from 25 to 44; and 24.8% were from 45 to 64. The gender makeup of the city was 48.0% male and 52.0% female. For every 100 females there were 92.3 males, and for every 100 females age 18 and over there were 87.1 males age 18 and over.

98.3% of residents lived in urban areas, while 1.7% lived in rural areas.

Of the 4,468 households, 26.2% had children under the age of 18 living in them. 44.9% were married-couple households, 5.5% were cohabiting-couple households, 30.8% had a female householder with no spouse or partner present, and 18.8% had a male householder with no spouse or partner present. 41.9% of households were non-families. 37.6% of all households were made up of individuals, and 18.2% had someone living alone who was 65 years of age or older.

There were 4,825 housing units, of which 7.4% were vacant. The homeowner vacancy rate was 1.8% and the rental vacancy rate was 9.8%.

Racial composition as of the 2020 census
Race	Number	Percent
White	9,432	91.4%
Black or African American	251	2.4%
American Indian and Alaska Native	14	0.1%
Asian	50	0.5%
Native Hawaiian and Other Pacific Islander	0	0.0%
Some other race	191	1.9%
Two or more races	383	3.7%
Hispanic or Latino (of any race)	441	4.3%

=== 2010 census ===
At the 2010 census there were 10,103 people, 4,357 households, and 2,605 families living in the city. The population density was 1,775.6 inhabitants per square mile (685.6/km^{2}). There were 4,698 housing units at an average density of 825.7 per square mile (318.8/km^{2}). The racial makeup of the city was 96.0% White, 0.5% African American, 0.1% Native American, 0.7% Asian, 1.5% from other races, and 1.3% from two or more races. Hispanic or Latino of any race were 2.4%.

Of the 4,357 households 28.6% had children under the age of 18 living with them, 47.7% were married couples living together, 9.0% had a female householder with no husband present, 3.1% had a male householder with no wife present, and 40.2% were non-families. 35.5% of households were one person and 16.7% were one person aged 65 or older. The average household size was 2.25 and the average family size was 2.91.

The median age was 42 years. 23.9% of residents were under the age of 18; 6.9% were between the ages of 18 and 24; 22.7% were from 25 to 44; 26.7% were from 45 to 64; and 19.7% were 65 or older. The gender makeup of the city was 47.1% male and 52.9% female.

=== 2000 census ===
At the 2000 census there were 10,106 people, 4,173 households, and 2,649 families living in the city. The population density was 1,823.2 inhabitants per square mile (703.9/km^{2}). There were 4,431 housing units at an average density of 799.4 per square mile (308.7/km^{2}). The racial makeup of the city was 98.57% White, 0.18% African American, 0.10% Native American, 0.51% Asian, 0.28% from other races, and 0.37% from two or more races. Hispanic or Latino of any race were 0.57%.

Of the 4,173 households 31.8% had children under the age of 18 living with them, 51.7% were married couples living together, 8.9% had a female householder with no husband present, and 36.5% were non-families. 31.9% of households were one person and 16.2% were one person aged 65 or older. The average household size was 2.36 and the average family size was 2.99.

Population spread: 25.9% under the age of 18, 8.0% from 18 to 24, 26.0% from 25 to 44, 20.4% from 45 to 64, and 19.7% 65 or older. The median age was 39 years. For every 100 females, there were 89.5 males. For every 100 females age 18 and over, there were 85.1 males.

The median household income was $39,854 and the median family income was $51,020. Males had a median income of $31,124 versus $22,215 for females. The per capita income for the city was $20,442. About 3.4% of families and 5.2% of the population were below the poverty line, including 3.8% of those under age 18 and 7.4% of those age 65 or over.

== Education ==
The public school district is the Carroll Community School District.

The area Catholic private school is the Kuemper Catholic School System, which includes Kuemper Catholic High School.

== Notable people ==
- Mary Arnold, singer with the rock group Kenny Rogers and The First Edition, wife of Roger Miller
- Joel Bolger, former Chief Justice of the Alaska Supreme Court
- Lance Cade, professional wrestler
- Adam Haluska, professional basketball player
- Ken Henderson (born 1946) Major League Baseball player from 1965 to 1980
- Mary Lundby (1948–2009) Former Iowa State Senator District 18
- Matthew McDermott, Associate Justice of the Iowa Supreme Court
- Tony Bernard Mosman (1886–1985), artist, poet and writer
- Arthur Neu, Lieutenant Governor of Iowa, 1973 - 1979
- Nick Nurse, head basketball coach for the Philadelphia 76ers
- Doug Riesenberg (born 1965), former football tackle (1987-1996)
- Everett Rogers communication scholar
- Carl O. Wegner, Minnesota state legislator and lawyer
- Joe Slade White, Democratic media consultant
