= List of North American football nicknames =

This is a list of nicknames in the sports of American football and Canadian football.

== Players ==
- "A-Train" – Mike Alstott, running back
- "All Day" – Adrian Peterson, running back
- “Action Jackson”— Lamar Jackson, Quarterback
- "The Assassin" - Jack Tatum, Oakland Raiders, safety
- "Avatar" – Jimmy Graham, tight end
- "Bad Moon" - Andre Rison, many teams, wide receiver
- "Baggadonuts" - Frank Winters, Green Bay Packers, center
- "The Bearded Pony" - Andrew Luck, Indianapolis Colts, named for his amazing beard and the fact that he plays for the Colts.
- "Beast Mode" – Marshawn Lynch, Seattle Seahawks, named for his violent running style and unusual ability to break tackles
- "Big Dick Nick" - Nick Foles, Philadelphia Eagles quarterback
- "Big Phil" - Phil Loadholt, Minnesota Vikings offensive tackle
- "Blood" - John McNally, Green Bay Packers, running back
- "Boob" - Bernard Darling, Green Bay Packers, center
- "Boomer"- Bob Brown, tackle
- "Broadway Joe" - Joe Namath, New York Jets, quarterback
- "Buckets" - Charles Goldenberg, Green Bay Packers, guard/running back
- "The Bus" - Jerome Bettis, Pittsburgh Steelers, running back
- “Butt Kicker” - Harrison Butker, Kansas City Chiefs, placekicker
- "Captain Comeback" - Roger Staubach, Dallas Cowboys, quarterback
- "The Claymaker" – Clay Matthews III
- "Cool Brees" – Drew Brees
- "The Cowboy" – Justin Smith
- "Crazy Legs" – Elroy Hirsch, running back/wide receiver
- "Curly" - Earl Louis Lambeau, Green Bay Packers, founder, halfback and coach
- "Danimal" – Dan Hampton
- "Danny Dimes" - Daniel Jones, New York Giants, quarterback
- "Deacon" - David Jones, Los Angeles Rams, defensive end
- “Dicker the Kicker” - Cameron Dicker, Los Angeles Chargers, placekicker
- "The Diesel" - John Riggins, Washington Redskins, running back
- "Dirty Dozen" = 1975 Dallas Cowboys team
- "The Dodger" – Roger Staubach, quarterback
- "The Dome Patrol" – the New Orleans Saints football team's linebacker corps of the late 1980s and the early 1990s. The Dome Patrol was rated by NFL Network as the #1 linebacker corps of all-time.
- "Easy E" – Eli Manning, quarterback, named for his relaxed demeanor even in pressure situations
- "Edge" - Edgerrin James, running back
- "Famous Jameis" - Jameis Winston, Tampa Bay Buccaneers, quarterback
- “Fat Randy” - Randy Bullock, Cincinnati Bengals, placekicker
- "Fatso"- Art Donovan, defensive tackle
- "The Freak" - Jevon Kearse, Tennessee Titans, defensive end
- "The Fridge" – William Perry (American football), defensive tackle
- "The Ghost" - Dave Casper, Tight End who participated in two famous Oakland Raiders Plays: "Ghost to the Post" & "Holy Roller (American football)"
- "Golden Boy" - Paul Hornung, Green Bay Packers, half back/kicker
- "The Gray Ghost of Gonzaga" - Tony Canadeo, halfback
- "Greasy"- Earle Neale, coach
- "The Gunslinger" – Brett Favre, quarterback
- "The Hangman"- Chris Hanburger- linebacker
- "Highway 63" - Gene Upshaw, Hall of Fame Guard who won two Super Bowls with the Oakland Raiders
- "The Hogs" – 1980s/1990s Washington Redskins offensive line
- "The Intellectual Assassin" - Ron Mix, offensive tackle
- "Joe Cool" - Joe Montana, quarterback
- "Johnny Football" - Johnny Manziel, quarterback
- "The Juice" – O. J. Simpson, running back
- "JJ "Swatt" – J. J. Watt, Houston Texans, named for his ability to bat down passes at the line of scrimmage
- "Jug" - Francis Louis Earp, Green Bay Packers, center
- "K-Gun" - the name given to the Buffalo Bills offense of the mid 1990s that was based on a similar offense called “run and shoot”, known for its no-huddle shotgun formations
- "The Kraken" - Greg Hardy, defensive end
- "Law Firm" - BenJarvus Green-Ellis, Running Back, because of his segmented name
- "Legatron" – Greg Zuerlein, Los Angeles Rams, placekicker
- "Legion of Boom™" – defensive backfield of the Seattle Seahawks (Richard Sherman, Kam Chancellor, Earl Thomas), named for their hard-hitting and physical style of play
- "The Lion"- Leo Nomellini, defensive tackle
- "Machine Gun Kelly" - Jim Kelly, quarterback, Buffalo Bills
- "The Manster" – Randy White, defensive tackle
- "Mean Joe" - Joe Greene, Pittsburgh Steelers, defensive end
- "Megatron" – Calvin Johnson, wide receiver
- "The Minister of Defense" - Reggie White, Philadelphia Eagles, Green Bay Packers, defensive end
- "The Missile" - Qadry Ismail, wide receiver
- "Minitron" - Julian Edelman, wide receiver
- "MJD" - Maurice Jones-Drew, running back
- “Money Badger” - Michael Badgley, Detroit Lions, placekicker
- “Money Mac” - Evan McPherson, Cincinnati Bengals, placekicker
- "The Muscle Hamster" – Doug Martin, running back
- "The New York Sack Exchange" - the New York Jets defensive line during the early 1980s
- "Night Train" – Dick Lane, a reference to his fear of flying and resultant travel to road games on night trains.
- "The No Fly Zone" – defensive backfield of the Denver Broncos
- "Orange Crush" – the 3–4 defense of the Denver Broncos during the late 1970s and early 1980s
- "Optimus Grimes" - Brent Grimes Cornerback
- "The Pocket Hercules" – Maurice Jones-Drew, running back
- "Pot Roast" – Terrance Knighton, defensive tackle
- "Primetime" – Deion Sanders, cornerback
- "Purple Jesus" - Adrian Petersen, Minnesota Vikings, running back
- "The Purple People Eaters" - the Minnesota Vikings defensive line during the 1970s
- "The Refrigerator" - William Perry, Chicago Bears, nose tackle
- "Robo-QB" - Todd Marinovich - quarterback
- "Robo-sack" - Rob Johnson, quarterback known for a reputation of being sacked frequently
- "Robokicker" - Dave Ridgway - place kicker for the Saskatchewan Roughriders, one of the most accurate placekickers in CFL history
- "Rocket" - Raghib Ismail - wide receiver
- "Shady" – LeSean McCoy, running back
- "The Sheriff" – Peyton Manning, quarterback a reference to Manning's pre-snap routine, which is one of the most recognizable in the NFL.
- “Shooter” - Evan McPherson, Cincinnati Bengals, placekicker
- "Showtime" - Patrick Mahomes, quarterback
- "The Silver Rush" - the Detroit Lions defensive line during the early 1980s
- "Smoking" – Jay Cutler, quarterback
- "Snacks" – Damon Harrison, Defensive Tackle.
- "The Snake" - Kenny Stabler, Hall of Fame quarterback who won Super Bowl XI with the Oakland Raiders
- "Steel Curtain" – the Pittsburgh Steelers defensive line during the 1970s
- "The Stork" - Ted Hendricks, Hall of Fame Linebacker who won Super Bowls with the Baltimore Colts and Oakland Raiders
- "Swede" - Chester Johnston, Green Bay Packers, running back
- "Sweetness" – Walter Payton, running back
- "Tiny" - Paul Engebretsen, Green Bay Packers, guard
- "Too Tall" - Edward Lee Jones, Dallas Cowboys, defensive end
- "The Toolbox" - Ed West, Green Bay Packers, tight end
- "The Tyler Rose" – Earl Campbell, an allusion to his hometown Tyler, Texas
- "White Shoes" – Billy Johnson, wide receiver
- "World" - Jerry Rice, San Francisco 49ers, wide receiver

== Teams ==
This is a list of nicknames of professional and college football teams. Many are merely abbreviations or diminutives of the team's name; otherwise, the origin of the nickname (if known) is noted. An asterisk (*) after a nickname indicates that the name is pejorative, insulting, or has at least a negative intent, and is often used by opponents or detractors (including fans when the team is performing poorly). Note on abbreviations: CFL – Canadian Football League; NFL – National Football League; NCAA – National Collegiate Athletic Association

=== American football ===
By nickname

- "Ain'ts*" – New Orleans Saints, NFL; rhyming play on the non-standard English negative ain't, first used during the 1980 season when the team went 1-15
- "America's Team" – Dallas Cowboys, by sports media
- "B.I.L.L.S.*" – Buffalo Bills, by detractors, acronyms for "Boy I Love Losing Super Bowls", in reference to the team's failure to win the Super Bowl in four straight tries during the early 1990s
- "Big Blue (Wrecking Crew)" – New York Giants, NFL; from the color of their jerseys, influenced by the nickname of IBM
- "The Black and Gold" – Pittsburgh Steelers, NFL; from their uniform colors
- "Black and Blue Division" – NFC North, NFL; from the division's rugged style of play in the 20th century (also "Frostbite Division")
- "The Blue Giants" – Used for New York Giants because of the team color
- "Bolts" – Los Angeles Chargers, NFL; from the lightning bolt design on their helmets
- "Bucs/Buckies" – Tampa Bay Buccaneers, NFL; abbreviation of team name
- "The Bungles" – Cincinnati Bengals, NFL; mainly used by detractors
- The Cardiac Cats – Carolina Panthers, coined in 2003 due to their frequent 4th-quarter comebacks and/or losses
- "Cheeseheads" – Nickname used for residents of Wisconsin in reference to the state's large dairy industry. Sometimes employed derogatorily by neighboring states, the moniker was embraced by residents, particularly Green Bay Packers fans, and has become synonymous with Wisconsin's football culture. (While the state is presently known for cheese production, the Packers team itself was originally named for the Indian meat packing company in Green Bay, WI.)
- "Cheatriots" -New England Patriots, NFL; Used by detractors as a reference to the Patriots cheating allegations during Bill Belichick and Tom Brady era
- "The Chefs" – Kansas City Chiefs, NFL; origin Snickers candy bar commercial; however, the NFL has licensed official "Kansas City Chief Head Chef Cookie Jars"
- "The Chesapeake Watershed Region Indigenous Persons" – Washington Redskins, NFL; translation of team name into politically correct terms It was later changed to "Potomac Drainage Basin Indigenous Persons" (see below) since the Baltimore Ravens also share the Chesapeake Bay region.
- "Clowns" - Cleveland Browns, NFL; used by detractors.
- The Cowgirls - Dallas Cowboys, by detractors.
- "Da Raidahs" – Las Vegas Raiders, NFL; The way Chris Berman of ESPN says, "The Raiders", a spoof of Raiders team owner Al Davis' accent.
- "Dawgs" – Cleveland Browns, NFL; according to Hanford Dixon, then a cornerback with the original Art Modell-owned Browns, he gave his defensive teammates this nickname to inspire them before the 1985 season
- "DeadSkins" – Washington Redskins, NFL; rhyming play on team name; used by detractors or disgruntled fans.
- "Detroit Lie-downs" – Detroit Lions, NFL; so called because they just lie down and let other teams run over them.
- "The Dirty Birds" – Atlanta Falcons, NFL; team dubbed themselves by this name during their race to Super Bowl XXXIII
- "The Dolts" – Indianapolis Colts, NFL; rhyming play on name with a term for "idiot"; by detractors
- "The Donks" – Denver Broncos, used by detractors.
- "The Empire" - Used by detractors to refer to either the Dallas Cowboys, due to their reputation of having a large fanbase, plentiful funds, and several Super Bowl rings, and the New England Patriots, due to their own reputation of also being one of the most hated teams in the NFL and being the de facto villain for the league, and because of their recent Super Bowl dynasty. The "role" of the Emperor is usually filled by Jerry Jones or Bill Belichick.
- "The Flaming Thumbtacks" – Tennessee Titans, NFL; a humorous interpretation of their team logo, actually a flaming stylized letter "T"
- "The Fins" – Miami Dolphins, NFL; play on abbreviation of name with the appendages of a dolphin
- "The Fish" – Miami Dolphins, NFL; while the mascot and team logo of bottlenose dolphins are not fish, but mammals. The rhyme detractors used when they played in the Orange Bowl was, "squish the fish in the Orange Dish." Now rarely used due to the Florida Marlins, who are also called "The Fish".
- "The Forty-Whiners/The Whiners" – San Francisco 49ers, used by detractors.
- "G-Men" – New York Giants, NFL; initial of team name, possibly a play on the term for a government (e.g., FBI) agent
- "Goats" – Los Angeles Rams, NFL; when playing poorly
- "Greatest Show on Turf" - St. Louis Rams, known for their league-leading offense from 1999 to 2001
- "Honolulu Blue Wrecking Crew" – Detroit Lions, NFL; from a primary color of the uniform
- "The Houston No-Wins" – Houston Texans, NFL; rhyming play on name when team is performing poorly
- "Iggles" – Philadelphia Eagles, NFL; reference to how some Philadelphians pronounce "Eagles"
- "Jags" – Jacksonville Jaguars, NFL; abbreviation of team name
- "Gang Green" – New York Jets, NFL; used by supporters (reference to medical condition that is difficult to overcome)(Green Bay Packers), NFL; used by supporters since the mid-1970s; also the name of the unofficial team mascot who is given home field credentials.
- "Jest" – New York Jets, NFL; humorous misspelling of team name; used when team is performing poorly
- "Jints" – New York Giants, NFL; used occasionally by local media, as eye dialect for the team's name. Also used for the baseball team while it was in New York.
- "Jokeland (Faders/Traitors)"* – Las Vegas Raiders, by detractors
- "Lambs" – Los Angeles Rams, NFL; a lamb being a soft, cuddly, meek baby sheep (as opposed to a ram, being an aggressive full-grown male sheep); rhyming nickname used by detractors when team performs poorly
- "Monsters of the Midway" – Chicago Bears, NFL; originally applied to the University of Chicago "Maroons", a strong (former) college football team; "Midway" refers to the Midway Plaisance, a long, green swath of boulevard space bordering the southern end of the campus. The University discontinued its football program in 1939, and the Bears adopted the nickname.
- "'Niners" – San Francisco 49ers, NFL; abbreviation of team name
- "The Oilers" – Tennessee Titans, NFL; a reference of the team's name before it moved to Tennessee, the Houston Oilers
- "The Tennessee Titanics"* – NFL, reference given to the team after their 0–6 start in 2009 including a 59–0 loss to the Patriots, this after going 13–3 in 2008
- "The Pack" – Green Bay Packers, NFL; abbreviation of name, and a play on the collective term for a group of animals such as dogs or wolves
- "Pats" – New England Patriots, NFL; abbreviation of team name
- "The Patsies" – New England Patriots, NFL; play on nickname "Pats" (above) and the term patsy , "a person who is easily manipulated or victimized"
- "The Potomac Drainage Basin Indigenous Persons" – Washington Redskins, NFL; translation of team name into politically correct terms, popularized by NFL columnist and Washington, D.C. resident Gregg Easterbrook in his weekly column Tuesday Morning Quarterback.
- "Seagulls" – Seattle Seahawks, term often said by detractors when Seahawks are playing poorly.
- "The Silver and Black" – Las Vegas Raiders, NFL; from the colors of the uniforms
- "Sinners" – New Orleans Saints, NFL; "sinner" is often a paired opposite of "saint"; used by detractors, but also as a result of New Orleans Saints Bounty Scandal
- "'Skins" – Washington Redskins, NFL; abbreviation of team name
- "'Stillers" – Pittsburgh Steelers, NFL; how native Pittsburghers (Picksbergers) pronounce the name of their team
- "Tennessee Traitors " * – Tennessee Titans, NFL; derisive nickname of the former Houston Oilers, usually aimed at owner Bud Adams by former Oilers fans
- “That Team Up North” or “TTUN” – Michigan Wolverines, NCAA; used by Ohio State Buckeyes and their fans in relation to the Michigan–Ohio State football rivalry.
- "Vikes" – Minnesota Vikings, NFL; abbreviation of team name

=== Canadian football ===
- "Als" – Montreal Alouettes, CFL; abbreviation of name
- "Argos" – Toronto Argonauts, CFL; abbreviation of name
- "The Blue and Gold" – Winnipeg Blue Bombers, CFL; after the team colours
- "The Boatmen" – Toronto Argonauts, CFL; in reference to the team's foundation by the Argonaut Rowing Club of Toronto, which in turn was derived from Jason and the Argonauts, mythical heroes and boatmen who are the namesake of both the rowing club and the CFL team
- "Bombers" – Winnipeg Blue Bombers, CFL; abbreviation of team name
- "The Double Blue" – Toronto Argonauts, CFL; in reference to the team colours, Oxford blue and Cambridge blue
- "Esks" or "Eskies" – Edmonton Eskimos, CFL; abbreviation of team name
- "'Gades" – Ottawa Renegades, CFL; abbreviation of team name
- "Jolly Green Giants" – Saskatchewan Roughriders for the colour of the team's uniforms and size of the players
- "Leos" – BC Lions, CFL; "Leo" is a common nickname for "lion" (from Latin, leo)
- "Roughies or Green Riders" – Saskatchewan Roughriders, CFL; Green Riders to differentiate team from the now defunct Ottawa team of the same name. Roughies - abbreviation of team name
- "Stamps" – Calgary Stampeders, CFL; abbreviation of team name
- "Tabbies" - Hamilton Tiger-Cats Tabby is a type of domestic cat with stripes
- "Ti-cats" – Hamilton Tiger-Cats, CFL; telescoping of team name

== See also ==
- Nickname
- List of NFL nicknames
- List of nicknamed NFL games and plays
- List of baseball nicknames
- List of basketball nicknames
- List of hockey nicknames
- List of athletes by nickname
- Lists of nicknames – nickname list articles on Wikipedia
- American football
- Canadian football
