= Agoro (surname) =

Agoro is a surname. Notable people with the surname include:

- Afeez Agoro (1975–2023), Nigerian model, actor, and reality television personality
- Mo Agoro (born 1993), English-born rugby league player
- Zaina Agoro, Nigerian American singer-songwriter
