= List of ice hockey nicknames =

This is a list of nicknames in the sport of ice hockey. Most are related to professional ice hockey such as the National Hockey League. A few notable nicknames from the Canadian major junior hockey leagues, the U.S. colleges, and national teams are excluded.

== Players ==
The following are hockey players listed by their last name along with nicknames. Players listed in bold are still active as of the 2025–2026 season.

Player	Nat	Nickname	Note
**Noel Acciari**	(United States)	Cookie	
David Aebischer	(Switzerland)	Abby, Bisher	
**Sebastian Aho**	(Finland)	Sepe, Seabass, Fishy, C-Bass, Sebby	
**Jake Allen**	(Canada)	Snake, Jake the Snake	
Dave Andreychuk	(Canada)	Wood	
Al Arbour	(Canada)	Radar	
Colby Armstrong	(Canada)	Army, Armdog	
George Armstrong	(Canada)	Chief	
Norm Armstrong	(Canada)	Red	
**Zach Aston-Reese**	(United States)	ZAR, Reeser	
**Cam Atkinson**	(United States)	Camsanity	
Jean-Sébastien Aubin	(Canada)	Seabass	
Larry Aurie	(Canada)	Little Dempsey	
P. J. Axelsson	(Sweden)	Pebben	
David Backes	(United States)	Captain America	
Nicklas Bäckström	(Sweden)	Dad, Nikkie	
Garnet Bailey	(Canada)	Ace	
Irving Bailey	(Canada)	Ace	
**Ivan Barbashev**	(Russia)	Barbie, Barbs	
Bill Barilko	(Canada)	Bashin' Bill	
Tom Barrasso	(United States)	Tomcat, Tommy B	
Tyson Barrie	(Canada)	Brutes, Four, T-Beauty	
**Mathew Barzal**	(Canada)	Gary, Barzy	
**Nathan Bastian**	(Canada)	Bas, Nasty, Big Nate	
Aldege Bastien	(Canada)	Baz	
Jonathan Battaglia	(United States)	Bates	
Ken Baumgartner	(Canada)	Bomber	
Don Beaupré	(Canada)	Bobo, Donnie Bo	
**Connor Bedard**	(Canada)	Bedsy	
Wade Belak	(Canada)	The Intimidator	
Ed Belfour	(Canada)	The Eagle, Eddie the Eagle, Crazy Eddie, Eddie the Billionaire	
Jean Béliveau	(Canada)	Le Gros Bil	
**Pierre-Édouard Bellemare**	(France)	Pebbles	
Emil Bemström	(Sweden)	Bemmer	
**Jamie Benn**	(Canada)	Chubbs	
Jordie Benn	(Canada)	Yukon Cornelius, Darth	
Beau Bennett	(United States)	Sunshine	
Max Bentley	(Canada)	Dipsy-Doodle-Dandy	
Gordon Berenson	(Canada)	Red, The Red Baron	
Andrew Berenzweig	(United States)	Bubba, Backdoor Bubba, Andy	
Aki Berg	(Finland)	Birdie, The King	
Patrice Bergeron	(Canada)	Bergy, St. Patrice, Prince Patrice	
**Jonatan Berggren**	(Sweden)	Jonny Burgers, Bergy	
Patrik Berglund	(Sweden)	Bergy, Bergdog	
Todd Bertuzzi	(Canada)	Big Bert	
Craig Berube	(Canada)	Chief	
Alex Biega	(Canada)	Bulldog	
Kevin Bieksa	(Canada)	Juice, The Sheriff, Boom Boom	
**Jordan Binnington**	(Canada)	Binner, Winnington, Sin Binner	
Martin Biron	(Canada)	Baby Dominator	
Ben Bishop	(United States)	Bish, Big Ben	
Paul Bissonnette	(Canada)	BizNasty, Biz	
**Anders Bjork**	(United States)	Bjorkie	
**Oliver Bjorkstrand**	(Denmark)	The Maestro, Bjorky, Bjork n' Beans	
**Nick Bjugstad**	(United States)	Rotisserie Chicken, Bjugy, Big Nick, Jughead, Bjugs	
Hector Blake	(Canada)	Toe	
**Sergei Bobrovsky**	(Russia)	Bob, Officer Bobrovsky, BOBROVSKY, Cop, Number One Cop On The Force	
Mikkel Bødker	(Denmark)	Hot Boed	
**Brock Boeser**	(United States)	The Flow, Brockstar, Boes, Mr. Sensitive	
Dave Bolland	(Canada)	The Rat, Greyhound, Bolly, Mimico	
Brandon Bollig	(United States)	B52	
Peter Bondra	(Slovakia)	Bonzai, The Special Agent	
Nick Bonino	(United States)	Bones	
Derek Boogaard	(Canada)	The Boogie Man, Boog	
Robert Bortuzzo	(Canada)	Bortz, Bobo, Tuzzy	
Émile Bouchard	(Canada)	Butch	
Brian Boucher	(United States)	Boosh	
Georges Boucher	(Canada)	Buck	
Francis Bouillon	(United States)	The Cube, Frank the Tank	
Jay Bouwmeester	(Canada)	JBouw, JBo, Bo, IT Jay, Tech Support Jay	
Johnny Bower	(Canada)	The China Wall	
Johnny Boychuk	(Canada)	Johnny Rocket, Manchuk	
Dan Boyle	(Canada)	Boiler, Danny Boy	
Tyler Bozak	(Canada)	Bozie, Flowzak, Phil Kessel's Chauffeur, Boze, Bozses, Tylie Bozman	
Donald Brashear	(United States)	Huggy Bear, The Don, Brash, Big Rig	
Andy Brickley	(United States)	Brick	
Daniel Brière	(Canada)	Mr. Playoffs, Cookie Monster, Danny Boy	
Frank Brimsek	(United States)	Mr. Zero	
Rod Brind'Amour	(Canada)	Rod the Bod, RBA	
Harold Broadbent	(Canada)	Punch	
**Philip Broberg**	(Sweden)	Brobee	
Walter Broda	(Canada)	Turk	
Martin Brodeur	(Canada)	Marty, Satan's Wallpaper, Uncle Daddy	
Richard Brodeur	(Canada)	King Richard, Kermit	
**Laurent Brossoit**	(Canada)	LB	
Adam Brown	(Scotland)	The Flying Scotsman	
Ilya Bryzgalov	(Russia)	Bryz, Mr. Universe, Universe, Breeze, Bryzaster, Siv, So Ginormous Big	
**Pavel Buchnevich**	(Russia)	Buch, Buchy, Big Giraffe 89	
Johnny Bucyk	(Canada)	Chief	
Peter Budaj	(Slovakia)	Ned Flanders, Buds, Budha, Buddy	
**André Burakovsky**	(Sweden)	Burracuda, Burky	
Pavel Bure	(Russia)	The Russian Rocket	
Valeri Bure	(Russia)	Russian Pocket Rocket, Val	
Adam Burish	(United States)	Bur, Casanova, Patient Zero	
Sean Burke	(Canada)	Big Bird, Burkie, The Burke Wall	
**Brent Burns**	(Canada)	Burnzie, The Wookie, Chewbacca	
Alex Burrows	(Canada)	Burr, The Dragon Slayer	
Steve Buzinski	(Canada)	The Puck Goes Inski	
Dustin Byfuglien	(United States)	Big Buff	
Dan Bylsma	(United States)	Disco Dan	
Kyle Calder	(Canada)	Grease	
Brian Campbell	(Canada)	Soupy, Rusty	
Gregory Campbell	(Canada)	Soupy, G Camp	
Daniel Carcillo	(Canada)	Carbomb, Gorilla Salad, Luigi	
**Brandon Carlo**	(United States)	Brando, Bambi, Barlo	
Jim Carey	(United States)	Net Detective, The Mask, Ace	
**Cole Caufield**	(United States)	Bilbo, Goal Caufield, Mr. Saturday Night	
Roman Čechmánek	(Czech Republic)	The Roman Empire, Roman Candle, Checko, The Bipolar Goaler	
**Peter Cehlárik**	(Slovakia)	Celery	
**Macklin Celebrini**	(Canada)	Mack, Celly	
Erwin Chamberlain	(Canada)	Murph, Old Hardrock	
Zdeno Chára	(Slovakia)	Big Z, Zaddy, The Big Man	
Gerry Cheevers	(Canada)	Cheesie	
Chris Chelios	(United States)	Chelly, Honey Nut, Soft Hands Chelios, The Godfather of USA Hockey	
Don Cherry	(Canada)	Grapes	
Jason Chimera	(Canada)	Chim Dawg, Chimmer, Ice Cheetah	
Erik Christensen	(Canada)	Crusher	
Francis Clancy	(Canada)	King	
Victor Clapper	(Canada)	Dit	
Wendel Clark	(Canada)	Wendy, Captain Crunch	
David Clarkson	(Canada)	Wendel Clarkson, Daveyyyyyyyy Clarkman, The Caged Warrior, Bottle Police, Grit Grinder	
James Cleghorn	(Canada)	Odie	
Sprague Cleghorn	(Canada)	Peg	
**Blake Coleman**	(United States)	Pickles	
**J. T. Compher**	(United States)	Comphy, Jimothy Timothy, Jompher Compher, 877-GOALS-NOW	
Mike Comrie	(Canada)	The Edmonton Kid, The Brick	
Charlie Conacher	(Canada)	The Big Bomber	
**Kyle Connor**	(United States)	KFC	
**Charlie Coyle**	(United States)	Baby Gronk, Sir Charles, Mayor of Weymouth	
Lionel Conacher	(Canada)	The Big Train	
Frederick Cook	(Canada)	Bun	
Matt Cooke	(Canada)	Cookie, Cookie Monster, POS	
Carson Cooper	(Canada)	Shovel-Shot	
Harold Cotton	(Canada)	Baldy	
Yvan Cournoyer	(Canada)	The Roadrunner	
Logan Couture	(Canada)	Cooch, LoCo, Juicy, Clutch	
**Sean Couturier**	(United States)	Coots, Cootsy, Cootsybear, Curt, Curtis, Lizard, The Answer, Rocket, Gerald	
**Dylan Cozens**	(Canada)	The Workhorse from Whitehorse	
Corey Crawford	(Canada)	Crow, Crawf	
**Sidney Crosby**	(Canada)	Sid the Kid, Sid, The Next One, Golden Boy, Captain Canada, Squidney, Creature, Darryl	
Matt Cullen	(United States)	Cully, Dad, Ageless Wonder	
Mariusz Czerkawski	(Poland)	The Polish Prince	
**Evgenii Dadonov**	(Russia)	Daddy, Dad, Big Daddy, Dads, Papi, Papa, Geno	
Ken Daneyko	(Canada)	Mr. Devil, Dano	
Pavel Datsyuk	(Russia)	The Magic Man, Pasha, Houdini	
Clarence Day	(Canada)	Hap, Happy	
**Alex DeBrincat**	(United States)	Cat, Brinksy, Kitty	
**Jake DeBrusk**	(Canada)	Jake the Snake, Snek, Bruskie, Jake from State Farm, Chef DeBrusk, JD	
Aaron Dell	(Canada)	Dellicious, Deller, World's Okayest Goalie	
**Ty Dellandrea**	(Canada)	Delly, Taco	
Alex Delvecchio	(Canada)	Fats	
Michael Del Zotto	(Canada)	DZ, Delly, Del-Z, MDZ, DJ MDZ	
Jason Demers	(Canada)	Dems	
Nathan Dempsey	(Canada)	Demmer	
Éric Desjardins	(Canada)	Rico	
Marcel Dionne	(Canada)	Little Beaver	
Rick DiPietro	(United States)	DiPi, Ricky D., Ricky Deep, Rico, Rickety	
**Max Domi**	(Canada)	Dom, Domes, Mad Max, Shootsy	
Tie Domi	(Canada)	The Albanian Assassin	
Joonas Donskoi	(Finland)	Donkey, Donks, Donny, The Donfather, Donscore	
Ed Dorohoy	(Canada)	The Great Gabbo	
Ken Dryden	(Canada)	The Thinker, Thieving Giraffe, Octopus	
Brandon Dubinsky	(United States)	Dubi	
**Pierre-Luc Dubois**	(Canada)	PLD	
**Matt Duchene**	(Canada)	Dutch, Dutchy, Dutch Oven, Chummer	
**Anthony Duclair**	(Canada)	The Duke	
Woodrow Dumart	(Canada)	Woody, Porky	
**Vince Dunn**	(Canada)	Dunndertaker	
André Dupont	(Canada)	Moose	
Pascal Dupuis	(Canada)	Duper, Super Duper	
Mervyn Dutton	(Canada)	Red	
Radek Dvořák	(Czech Republic)	The Keyboard	
Cecil Dye	(Canada)	Babe	
**Jordan Eberle**	(Canada)	Ebs, Mr. Clutch, Gary	
**Nikolaj Ehlers**	(Denmark)	Fly, Danish Dash, Great Dane, Little Buddy Nik	
**Lars Eller**	(Denmark)	Larry, The Great Dane, L'Harceleur, Tiger	
Leighton Emms	(Canada)	Hap	
Phil Esposito	(Canada)	Espie, Espo	
Tony Esposito	(Canada)	Tony O	
Bob Essensa	(Canada)	Goalie Bob, Sense, Enzo, Backup Bob	
**Radek Faksa**	(Czech Republic)	Fee-koos, Fee-koo-seena	
Todd Fedoruk	(Canada)	The Fridge	
Ray Ferraro	(Canada)	Chicken Parm, Pee Wee, Seagull, The Big Ball of Hate, Ferraro Rocher	
Frank Finnigan	(Canada)	The Shawville Express	
Tomáš Fleischmann	(Czech Republic)	The Flash	
Bill Flett	(Canada)	Cowboy	
Marc-André Fleury	(Canada)	Flower, MAF, The Dude	
Ron Flockhart	(Canada)	Flockey Hockey	
**Warren Foegele**	(Canada)	Foegs, McLovin, Warr En Fuego	
**Marcus Foligno**	(United States)	Moose	
**Nick Foligno**	(United States)	Fliggy, The Captain, Uncle Nick	
Lou Fontinato	(Canada)	Leaping Louie	
Peter Forsberg	(Sweden)	Foppa, Peter the Great	
Jimmy Fowler	(Canada)	The Blonde Bouncer	
Ron Francis	(Canada)	Ronnie Franchise	
Johan Franzén	(Sweden)	Mule	
Grant Fuhr	(Canada)	Coco	
Link Gaetz	(Canada)	The Missing Link	
Norman Gainor	(Canada)	Dutch	
Alexander Galchenyuk	(Belarus)	Belarusian Bonbon	
**Alex Galchenyuk**	(United States)	Chucky, A.Gally	
**Brendan Gallagher**	(Canada)	Gally, B.Gally	
Jake Gardiner	(United States)	Gards, Silver Stick	
Johnny Gaudreau	(United States)	Johnny Hockey, Johnny Ham and Cheese	
Paul Gaustad	(United States)	Goose	
**Éric Gélinas**	(Canada)	The Truth (only his shot)	
Martin Gélinas	(Canada)	The Eliminator	
Bernie Geoffrion	(Canada)	Boom-Boom	
Blake Geoffrion	(Canada)	Bam-Bam	
Jean-Sébastien Giguère	(Canada)	Jiggy	
Hal Gill	(United States)	Skillsie, USS Gill, Gilly	
Clark Gillies	(Canada)	Jethro	
Doug Gilmour	(Canada)	Killer, Dougie	
**Claude Giroux**	(Canada)	G, Ginger, G-zus	
Alex Goligoski	(United States)	Go-Go, Goose	
**Nikolay Goldobin**	(Russia)	Goldy	
Sergei Gonchar	(Russia)	Gonch, Benjamin Button	
Larry Goodenough	(Canada)	Izzy	
**Shayne Gostisbehere**	(United States)	Ghost, Ghost-Bear, The Holy Ghost, God	
Mikhail Grabovski	(Belarus)	Grabo, Crosbovski, Garbageovski	
**Mikael Granlund**	(Finland)	Granny, Granny Smith	
Gilles Gratton	(Canada)	Gratoony the Loony	
**Ryan Graves**	(Canada)	Gravy, The Gravy Train	
Josh Green	(Canada)	Anchorman	
Mike Green	(Canada)	Game Over	
Wayne Gretzky	(Canada)	The Great One, The Great Gretzky, Gretz, Douglas, Doug	
Stu Grimson	(Canada)	The Grim Reaper	
**Philipp Grubauer**	(Germany)	Grubi/Gruby/Grubie, The German Gentleman, Schnitzel	
Armand Guidolin	(Canada)	Bep	
Carl Gunnarsson	(Sweden)	Gunner, Boom Boom	
**Nikita Gusev**	(Russia)	Goose	
Jonas Gustavsson	(Sweden)	The Monster, Gus, Gus Bus	
Carl Hagelin	(Sweden)	Hags, Haggy, Everything Hagel, Old Hag	
**Jani Hakanpää**	(Finland)	Hak, Hakan Dazs	
Jaroslav Halák	(Slovakia)	Crackhalakin', Crackhalak, Jarooooooo, The Brick Wall	
Glenn Hall	(Canada)	Mr. Goalie	
Andrew Hammond	(Canada)	The Hamburglar, Hammy	
Michal Handzuš	(Slovakia)	Zeus	
Dominik Hašek	(Czech Republic)	Dominator, Hašan, Hashtag	
**Kevin Hayes**	(United States)	Hayesy, Big Cat	
Johan Hedberg	(Sweden)	Moose, Yo-Yo	
Ron Hextall	(Canada)	Hexy, Hex, Voodoo	
Mel Hill	(Canada)	Sudden Death	
Flash Hollett	(Canada)	Flash	
Niklas Hjalmarsson	(Sweden)	Hammer, Swedish Missile Defense System, Toftbo	
Tomas Holmström	(Sweden)	Homer, Demolition Man, Holm Sweet Holm	
Braden Holtby	(Canada)	Holtbeast, The Great Wall of Chinatown, Holtbae, The Beast, Holts, Mr. Beast	
George Horner	(Canada)	Red	
Patric Hörnqvist	(Sweden)	Horny, Bengan	
Réjean Houle	(Canada)	Peanut	
Gordie Howe	(Canada)	Mr. Hockey, Number 9, Mr. Everything, Mr. All-Star, The Most, Great Gordie, Mr. Elbows	
Jiří Hudler	(Czech Republic)	Happy	
Cristobal Huet	(France)	The Man From France, CristoWall, Le Cousin, Hip-hip-hu-et	
**Jack Hughes**	(United States)	Genius	
**Luke Hughes**	(United States)	Rusty, Genius Junior	
**Quinn Hughes**	(United States)	Huggy Bear	
Bobby Hull	(Canada)	The Golden Jet	
Brett Hull	(Canada)	The Golden Brett	
Matt Hunwick	(United States)	Munch, Hunny	
Al Iafrate	(United States)	Wild Thing, The Hammer, The Skullet	
Jarome Iginla	(Canada)	Iggy	
George Imlach	(Canada)	Punch, Fruit Punch, Punchy	
**Jaromír Jágr**	(Czech Republic)	Mario Jr., Jags (pronounced "yags"), Jarda, The Ageless Wonder, Jagr Bomb	
Harvey Jackson	(Canada)	Busher	
**Marcus Johansson**	(Sweden)	Mojo, Jojo, Mojo-jojo	
Erik Johnson	(United States)	The Condor, Edge, EJ	
**Wyatt Johnston**	(Canada)	Johnny, Henry, Dub	
Ivan Wilfred Johnson	(Canada)	Ching, Cha-Ching, The Money Man	
Ryan Johnson	(Canada)	Duce, RJ	
**Andreas Johnsson**	(Sweden)	Mango	
**Jyrki Jokipakka**	(Finland)	Kevin	
Aurèle Joliat	(Canada)	Little Giant	
Martin Jones	(Canada)	Joner, Jonesey, Game of Jones, Marty, MJ	
Curtis Joseph	(Canada)	Cujo	
Ed Jovanovski	(Canada)	Jovocop, Edge	
Bill Juzda	(Canada)	The Honest Brakeman	
**Nazem Kadri**	(Canada)	Nifty Mittens, Big Naz, Nazeem the Dream, Naz, The Dream, Nazty, Nasty Naz	
Rudolph Kampman	(Canada)	Bingo	
**Patrick Kane**	(United States)	Kaner, The Doctor, Peekaboo, 20-Cent, Kandy Kane, Buzz, Doc, Lil' Peekaboo, Peeks, Dr. Kane, Showtime, Pattycakes, He Came, He Saw, He Kanequered, Jonny's Boy,	
**Kirill Kaprizov**	(Russia)	Kirill The Thrill, Dollar Bill Kirill	
**Erik Karlsson**	(Sweden)	King Karl, EK65, The Swedish Bobby Orr, Karlito	
**William Karlsson**	(Sweden)	Wild Bill	
Matt Kassian	(Canada)	Kassassination	
Duncan Keith	(Canada)	Duncs, Jigsaw, Dunkaroo	
Clayton Keller	(United States)	Kells, Captain America	
Leonard Kelly	(Canada)	Red, Pep	
**Adrian Kempe**	(Sweden)	Juice	
Ted Kennedy	(Canada)	Teeder	
Tyler Kennedy	(Canada)	TK	
Ryan Kesler	(United States)	Kes, Guzzler, Beast Mode, Kesbian	
Phil Kessel	(United States)	Phil the Thrill, The Phil, Philly Cheese, The Philash, Hotdog Boy, A Stanley Cup Champion, The Iron Man, Kess, The Legend	
Nikolai Khabibulin	(Russia)	The 'Bulin Wall	
Anton Khudobin	(Russia)	Dobby	
Hec Kilrea	(Canada)	Hurricane Hec	
Miikka Kiprusoff	(Finland)	Kipper, Finnisher	
**John Klingberg**	(Sweden)	Burger, Klinger, The Ghost of Gothenburg, Klingbae	
Joe Klukay	(Canada)	The Duke of Padocah	
Chuck Kobasew	(Canada)	Chuckie	
**Pyotr Kochetkov**	(Russia)	Koochie, Pyotr the Great, Pyotr Pan, PK	
Saku Koivu	(Finland)	Captain K	
Olaf Kölzig	(Germany)	Ollie the Goalie, Zilla, Godzilla, Kolzilla, The Snowman, The O-liminator	
**Leo Komarov**	(Finland)	Corporal Komarov, Leo, Uncle Leo, The Russian Finn from Estonia	
Vladimir Konstantinov	(Soviet Union)	Vladdy, The Vladinator, Vlad the Impaler, The Red Shark	
Anže Kopitar	(Slovenia)	Kopi, Raccoon Jesus, Flowpitar, Tarzan	
**Joonas Korpisalo**	(Finland)	Korpi, Magikorp	
**Jesperi Kotkaniemi**	(Finland)	KK, Moomin	
Alexei Kovalev	(Russia)	AK27, Kovi, l'Artiste, Loafalev	
David Krejčí	(Czech Republic)	French Fries, Krech, Playoff Krejci	
**Nikita Kucherov**	(Russia)	Kuuuch, The Russian Rifle, NK-86	
**Darcy Kuemper**	(Canada)	Kuemperture Rising, Pride and Prejudice, The Kuemperor, Kuemps (Kemps), The Milkman	
Chris Kunitz	(Canada)	Kuni, Kunikaze, The Koon, Kuny	
Leonard Labine	(Canada)	Leo the Lion	
Blaine Lacher	(Canada)	Locks, Lacher Monster, The Lach Net Monster	
Andrew Ladd	(Canada)	Gary, Ladder, Ladds, Wee Lad	
Guy Lafleur	(Canada)	The Flower, Le Démon Blond, That Guy	
Edouard Lalonde	(Canada)	Newsy	
**Gabriel Landeskog**	(Sweden)	Landy, Gabe the Babe, Lando, Mandeskog	
Dave Langevin	(United States)	Bammer	
Rod Langway	(United States)	The Secretary of Defense	
Ian Laperrière	(Canada)	Mumbles, Lappy, The Sparkplug	
Georges Laraque	(Canada)	Douli, Big, The Vegan	
Igor Larionov	(Russia)	The Professor	
**Dylan Larkin**	(United States)	D-Boss, Larks, The Larkness Monster, The Lark Night, Dylan Dylan Dylan, The Bird Man	
**Adam Larsson**	(Sweden)	Big Cat, Lars	
Michael Latta	(Canada)	Latts, Latvia, Steamboat	
Reggie Leach	(Canada)	The Riverton Rifle	
John LeClair	(United States)	Johnny Vermont	
**Nick Leddy**	(United States)	Ledpipe, Ledds, Mumbles, Sled Dog, Ledd Dog	
Manny Legace	(Canada)	Legs, The God, The Ferret, Jimmy Buffett	
Robin Lehner	(Sweden)	Panda	
Jere Lehtinen	(Finland)	King of Little Things	
Claude Lemieux	(Canada)	Pepe	
Mario Lemieux	(Canada)	The Magnificent One, Le Magnifique, Super Mario, Ace, Jagr Sr	
**Kris Letang**	(Canada)	Tanger, Bang Bang, Legend, Tango	
Mark Letestu	(Canada)	The Test Tube	
Nicklas Lidström	(Sweden)	Lids, The Perfect Human, Lidas	
Oskar Lindblom	(Sweden)	Lindy, Piano Man	
Trevor Linden	(Canada)	Captain Canuck, Captain Clutch	
Ted Lindsay	(Canada)	Terrible Ted	
Ken Linseman	(Canada)	The Rat	
**Milan Lucic**	(Canada)	Looch, Lurch, Loooooooch, Mean Milan	
Harry Lumley	(Canada)	Apple Cheeks	
Henrik Lundqvist	(Sweden)	King Henrik, Hank, The King, Henke	
Roberto Luongo	(Canada)	Lou, Bobby-Lu, Bingo Bango Bongo Luongo, Strombone	
**Nathan MacKinnon**	(Canada)	Dogg, NateDogg, The Dog, Mack Daddy, Nate the Great	
John Madden	(Canada)	Mad Dog, Coach	
Frank Mahovlich	(Canada)	The Big M	
Peter Mahovlich	(Canada)	The Little M	
**Evgeni Malkin**	(Russia)	Geno, Geno Machine-o, The Bully, Russian Bear	
Greg Malone	(Canada)	Bugsy	
Ryan Malone	(United States)	Bugsy	
**Cale Makar**	(Canada)	All Hail Cale	
Harold March	(Canada)	Mush	
**Brad Marchand**	(Canada)	Marchy, The Rat, Nose Face Killah, Little Ball of Hate, Squirrel, Ratatouille	
**Mason Marchment**	(Canada)	Mush	
**Mitch Marner**	(Canada)	Magic Mitch, Mitchy, Micky Mouse, The Magician, Marns, Mitchy Marner, Bruno Marns	
Patrick Maroon	(United States)	Big Rig, Fat Pat, Fatty Patty, Hometown Hero	
Paul Martin	(United States)	Paulie, Paul-Martin-American-Hero, Marty, Pistol	
**Auston Matthews**	(United States)	A-Matts, Papi, AM34, Matty, Tone	
Brad May	(Canada)	May Day	
Jamal Mayers	(Canada)	Jammer	
**Charlie McAvoy**	(United States)	Mac, Chuck, Chucky Bright lights	
**Connor McDavid**	(Canada)	Davo, McJesus	
Wilfred McDonald	(Canada)	Bucko	
Curtis McElhinney	(Canada)	McBackup, Tabasco	
Frank McGee	(Canada)	One-Eyed	
**Ryan McLeod**	(Canada)	Clouder	
Kirk McLean	(Canada)	Captain Kirk, Mack, McGoalie, The Iceman, The Scot	
Jamie McLennan	(Canada)	Noodles	
Mark Messier	(Canada)	Moose, The Messiah, The Captain, Satan, MoFo, "Messy, eh?"	
Stan Mikita	(Slovakia) (Canada)	Stosh, Stan The Man	
**Colin Miller**	(Canada)	Chiller	
Willie Mitchell	(Canada)	Bill Pickle	
Alexander Mogilny	(Russia)	AlMo, Alexander the Great	
Al Montoya	(United States)	The Big Cuban, Monty	
Andy Moog	(Canada)	Papa Moog, Peaches, Moger, Squeaky, Dennis The Menace	
Howie Morenz	(Canada)	The Stratford Streak, The Mitchell Meteor	
Ken Morrow	(United States)	Wolfman	
Kirk Muller	(Canada)	Captain Kirk	
Douglas Murray	(Sweden)	Crankshaft, Cranky	
**Matt Murray**	(Canada)	Murr, Murrdawg, Muzz	
**Tyler Myers**	(Canada)	The Big Easy, Big Tex, Chaos Giraffe, Mysie	
Evgeni Nabokov	(Russia) (Kazakhstan)	Nabby, John	
Lou Nanne	(Canada)	Sweet Lou from the Soo	
James Neal	(Canada)	Lazy, Nealer, Real Deal	
**Martin Nečas**	(Czech Republic)	Junior, Marty Junior, Nachos, Sugar Boo	
Cam Neely	(Canada)	Bam-Bam Cam	
**Jake Neighbours**	(Canada)	Jakey Boy	
Scott Nichol	(Canada)	Scooter	
Bernie Nicholls	(Canada)	The Pumper Nicholl Kid	
**Valeri Nichushkin**	(Russia)	Choo-Choo Train, Nuke, Big Val	
Antti Niemi	(Finland)	Nemo, The Finnish Fortress	
Joe Nieuwendyk	(Canada)	Nieuwy, Nieuws, Nieuwsy	
Frank Nighbor	(Canada)	The Pembroke Peach	
Chris Nilan	(United States)	Knuckles	
Matt Niskanen	(United States)	Nisky, Tuna, Steadzo Glensky	
**Ryan Nugent-Hopkins**	(Canada)	Nuge, RNH, Nugget	
**William Nylander**	(Sweden)	Willy Styles, Breakaway Man	
Shane O'Brien	(Canada)	SOB	
Herbert O'Connor	(Canada)	Buddy	
**Logan O'Connor**	(Canada) (United States)	LOC	
**Jake Oettinger**	(United States)	Otter	
John O'Flaherty	(Canada)	Peanuts	
**Jamie Oleksiak**	(Canada)	Big Rig	
Steve Oleksy	(United States)	Binky	
**Ryan O'Reilly**	(Canada)	Factor, The O'Reilly Factor, Rhino, ROR, Snook	
Brooks Orpik	(United States)	Free Candy, Brooksie, Batya, Orpy	
Chris Osgood	(Canada)	The Wizard of Oz, Ozzie, The Wiz	
**Alexander Ovechkin**	(Russia)	Ovi, Alexander the Great, The Great 8, Ov8chkin, Ovie, O, Mama Bear, OV-ho	
Max Pacioretty	(United States)	Patches, Wolverine	
**Jean-Gabriel Pageau**	(Canada)	Pager, J-G, JGP, Honey Badger	
Žigmund Pálffy	(Slovakia)	Ziggy	
**Kyle Palmieri**	(United States)	Palms, Palm Tree, Palm Reader. Palm-Bomb	
Nick Palmieri	(United States)	Napalm	
**Artemi Panarin**	(Russia)	Breadman, Bread	
Mark Parrish	(United States)	Grumpy	
**David Pastrňák**	(Czech Republic)	Pasta, Pastrnasty, Krejci 2.0, Alfredo, Noodles	
Joe Pavelski	(United States)	The Big Pavelski, Pavs, Little Joe, The Weasel, Joe Money, Captain America, Cap	
Michael Peca	(Canada)	Captain Crunch	
Dustin Penner	(Canada)	Pancakes	
**David Perron**	(Canada)	DP57, French Toast, Frenchie	
Rich Peverley	(Canada)	Raptor Jesus, Pevs	
Dion Phaneuf	(Canada)	D, Neuf, Neufy, Double Dion, Pylon	
Chris Phillips	(Canada)	Big Rig	
Alf Pike	(Canada)	The Embalmer	
Félix Potvin	(Canada)	The Cat	
**Marie-Philip Poulin**	(Canada)	MPP, Pou, Captain Clutch	
Walter Pratt	(Canada)	Babe	
Carey Price	(Canada)	Pricey, Pricer, Jesus Price, The Price is Right/Wrong, Carey the Cup, Gary	
Brandon Prust	(Canada)	Prusty	
Cliff Purpur	(Canada)	Fido	
André Racicot	(Canada)	Red Light	
**Mikko Rantanen**	(Finland)	Big Moose, The Fantastic Finn, Hot Wheels, Mikko Sauvé	
Andrew Raycroft	(Canada)	Razor, Rake	
**Lucas Raymond**	(Sweden)	Razor	
Mark Recchi	(Canada)	The Wrecking Ball, Rex	
Earl Reibel	(Canada)	Dutch	
**James Reimer**	(Canada)	Optimus Reim, Busta Reim, The Statue, The Reim Minister of Defence, Magic Angel Robot from Winnipeg	
Glenn Resch	(Canada)	Chico	
Mike Ribeiro	(Canada)	Mickey Ribs	
Henri Richard	(Canada)	The Pocket Rocket	
Maurice Richard	(Canada)	The Rocket	
**David Rittich**	(Czech Republic)	Big Save Dave, Rittich Astley, RittichRolled	
**Jason Robertson**	(United States)	Robo	
Larry Robinson	(Canada)	Big Bird	
Luc Robitaille	(Canada)	Lucky	
Jeremy Roenick	(United States)	J. R., Styles	
Dwayne Roloson	(Canada)	Roli the Goalie, Rolo, Roli	
Patrick Roy	(Canada)	Casseau, Saint Patrick, The Wall	
Michal Rozsíval	(Czech Republic)	Rosey	
**German Rubtsov**	(Russia)	The Germ	
**Bryan Rust**	(United States)	Big Game Bryan Rust, Rusty, Rusty Razor, Mr. Elimination, Rustache	
**Brandon Saad**	(United States)	The ManChild, The Saadfather, Saader	
Joe Sakic	(Canada)	Burnaby Joe, Super Joe, Mr Clutch	
Ruslan Salei	(Belarus)	Rusty	
Sami Salo	(Finland)	The Finnish MacInnis	
Derek Sanderson	(Canada)	Turk	
Curtis Sanford	(Canada)	The Sandman	
Glen Sather	(Canada)	Slats	
**Brayden Schenn**	(Canada)	Schenner, Big Ten	
Rob Schremp	(United States)	The Cocktail Schremp, Bob The Builder	
David Schriner	(Canada)	Sweeney	
Dave Schultz	(Canada)	The Hammer	
Ben Scrivens	(Canada)	The Professor, Scrivy, Scrivezina, Scrivin' Eagle	
Rob Scuderi	(United States)	The Piece, Scuds, Scudsy	
Brent Seabrook	(Canada)	Biscuit, Seabs, Seabsy	
**Tyler Seguin**	(Canada)	The Kid, Segs, Seggy, Seggo, Too Segsy For His Shirt, Wifey	
Teemu Selänne	(Finland)	The Finnish Flash, Teukka Salama	
Eddie Shack	(Canada)	The Entertainer	
Andrew Shaw	(Canada)	Shawzy, The Mutt, Scraps	
Patrick Sharp	(Canada)	Sharpy, Shooter	
Fred Shero	(Canada)	The Fog	
Eddie Shore	(Canada)	Old Blood and Guts, Mr. Hockey, The Edmonton Express	
Albert Siebert	(Canada)	Babe	
**Artūrs Šilovs**	(Latvia)	Baltic Brick Wall, Arty Party	
Harold Simpson	(Canada)	Bullet Joe	
Jack Skille	(United States)	Crash, Skills, JackJack, Skittles	
**Jeff Skinner**	(Canada)	Skinny, Skins, Justin Bieber of Hockey	
Kārlis Skrastiņš	(Latvia)	Ironman	
Jim Slater	(United States)	Jimmy Slats	
Billy Smith	(Canada)	Billy the Kid, Battlin' Billy, Hatchet Man	
Jason Smith	(Canada)	Gator	
Reginald Smith	(Canada)	Hooley	
**Will Smith**	(United States)	Kibble, Puppy, Smitty, The Fresh Prince of San Jose	
Ryan Smyth	(Canada)	Captain Canada, Smytty	
**Jordan Staal**	(Canada)	Jordo, Staalsie, Gronk, Shorty Jordy, Staal Bunyan, Steeler	
Wally Stanowski	(Canada)	The Whirling Dervish	
Tim Stapleton	(United States)	Stapler, Tiger, Buster, Stapes	
**Sam Steel**	(Canada)	Steeler, Sammy Sousa, Soss, Steel Sandwich	
Scott Stevens	(Canada)	Captain Crunch, Artie, Dad	
Jack Stewart	(Canada)	Black Jack	
Marco Sturm	(Germany)	German	
**Tim Stützle**	(Germany)	Jimmy, Jimmy Stü	
P. K. Subban	(Canada)	Subby, Subs, Subbanator, The Turtle, Denzel	
George Sullivan	(Canada)	Red	
Mats Sundin	(Sweden)	Sudden, The Big Weed, Weed	
**Oskar Sundqvist**	(Sweden)	Sunny, Sunshine	
Brandon Sutter	(United States) (Canada)	Suttsy, Sutty, Flat Stanley, Goose, A-Rog	
Brent Sutter	(Canada)	Pup	
Duane Sutter	(Canada)	Dog	
**Nick Suzuki**	(Canada)	Slick Nick, Suzuki Swift	
**Jeremy Swayman**	(United States)	Sway, Bulldog	
Maxime Talbot	(Canada)	Mad Max, Superstar, Rocky	
**Brandon Tanev**	(Canada)	Rusty, Turbo, Tans, Tanny	
**Tomáš Tatar**	(Slovakia)	Souse, Tatar Sauce, Hot Sauce, Trtko, Tuna	
**Teuvo Teräväinen**	(Finland)	Turbo, Turbo Time, Finnish Cold, Teukka, Tiny, Dragon, Dragon Boy	
Chris Therien	(Canada)	Bundy	
**Robert Thomas**	(Canada)	RobTom, Matchbox, Smooth, Tommer, Thurmy	
Steve Thomas	(United Kingdom) (Canada)	Stumpy	
Tim Thomas	(United States)	The Tank, Tim Tom, Tiny Tim, Boston cab, The Stash	
**Tage Thompson**	(United States)	TNT	
Chris Thorburn	(Canada)	Thorbs, Thor	
Joe Thornton	(Canada)	Jumbo Joe, Big Joe, Big Bird, The Beard	
**Chris Tierney**	(Canada)	The Cobra	
**Brady Tkachuk**	(United States)	Chucky	
Keith Tkachuk	(United States)	Big Walt	
**Matthew Tkachuk**	(United States)	The Rat King, Chucky	
**Devon Toews**	(Canada)	Tazer	
**Jonathan Toews**	(Canada)	Tazer, Captain Serious, To-es, Jonathan Toes, Jonny, Captain Veggie, Captain Planet	
**Tyler Toffoli**	(Canada)	Toff	
**Alexey Toropchenko**	(Russia)	Alex, Torpo	
Ron Tugnutt	(Canada)	Tugger, The Accountant, Nuts	
Marty Turco	(Canada)	Turks, Turkey	
Garry Unger	(Canada)	Iron Man	
Steve Valiquette	(Canada)	The Big Valley, Big Bird, Big Valvoski, The Great Valvoski	
John Vanbiesbrouck	(United States)	Beezer, JVB	
Elmer Vasko	(Canada)	Moose	
Pat Verbeek	(Canada)	Little Ball of Hate	
Kris Versteeg	(Canada)	Steegs, Steeger, Beauty, Verbeauty	
Georges Vézina	(Canada)	The Chicoutimi Cucumber	
Marc-Édouard Vlasic	(Canada)	Pickles, Pickle Jar, Eddie	
Jakub Voráček	(Czech Republic)	Jake, Snake, Scoracek, Voras	
Niclas Wallin	(Sweden)	The Gorilla, The Secret Weapon, Hamburgers	
**Jesper Wallstedt**	(Sweden)	The Wall of St. Paul	
Mike Walton	(Canada)	Shakey	
Cam Ward	(Canada)	Wardo, The Warden, Net Warden	
**Scott Wedgewood**	(Canada)	Wedgie, Wedgewall	
Kevin Weekes	(Canada)	Cheesy, Weekesy, Shady 80	
Ralph Weiland	(Canada)	Cooney	
Marvin Wentworth	(Canada)	Cyclone	
**Zach Werenski**	(United States)	Z, Big Z	
Blake Wheeler	(United States)	Wheels, Big Wheels, Captain Wrench, Captain Handsome	
Ray Whitney	(Canada)	The Wizard	
Ryan Whitney	(United States)	Whit, Whitdog	
David Williams	(Canada)	Tiger	
Justin Williams	(Canada)	Mr. Game 7, Stick, J-Dubs	
**Tom Wilson**	(Canada)	Whip, Willy, Willy Baby, Ten Train	
James Wisniewski	(United States)	Wiz	
Lorne Worsley	(Canada)	Gump, The Gumper	
**Arber Xhekaj**	(Canada)	The Sheriff, Wi-Fi, Big X, Hamilton Hammer	
**Kailer Yamamoto**	(United States)	Honey Badger, Yamo	
Doug Young	(Canada)	The Gleichen Cowboy	
Steve Yzerman	(Canada)	Stevie Wonder, Stevie-Y, The Captain	
**Nikita Zadorov**	(Russia)	Z, The Russian Hitman	
Jeff Zatkoff	(United States)	Tishy, Mr. Game One	
Henrik Zetterberg	(Sweden)	Ice Berg, Zata, Hank, Z	
Alexei Zhamnov	(Soviet Union) (Russia)	Archie	
Sergei Zubov	(Russia)	Zubie	

== See also ==
- Nickname
- List of ice hockey linemates
- List of athletes by nickname
- List of monarchs by nickname
- Lists of nicknames – nickname list articles on Wikipedia
