= List of nicknames in basketball =

This is a list of nicknames in the sport of basketball. Most are related to professional basketball, although a few notable nicknames from the U.S. college game are included.

== Players ==
=== A ===
- Kareem Abdul-Jabbar – "The Captain", "Captain Hook",
- Bam Adebayo – "Bam", "The Onomatopoeia"
- Abiodun Adegoke – "Big Naija"
- Ray Allen – "Ray Ray", "Sugar Ray", "Jesus Shuttlesworth" (after his character in the movie He Got Game)
- Rafer Alston – "Skip To My Lou"
- Jose Alvarado – "Grand Theft Alvarado"
- Chris Andersen – "Birdman"
- Anthony Anderson – "Double A"
- Greg Anderson – "Cadillac"
- Giannis Antetokounmpo – "Greek Freak", "The Alphabet"
- Carmelo Anthony – "Melo", "Captain America", "The Patriot", "Hoodie Melo"
- Ogugua Anunoby Jr. – "OG"
- Nate Archibald – "Tiny"
- Gilbert Arenas – "Agent Zero", "The Hibachi", "Black President", "Nacho", "Gil", "High-Noon", "The Gambler"
- Trevor Ariza – "Cobra", "Switchblade", "Athreeza"
- Paul Arizin – "Pitchin' Paul"
- Stacey Augmon – "Plastic Man"

=== B ===
- Ken Bannister – "The Manimal" (Childhood nickname)
- Andrea Bargnani – "Il Mago" (The Magician) (In Italy)
- Charles Barkley – "Chuck", "The Round Mound of Rebound", "Sir Charles", "Prince Charles", "Leaning Tower of Pizza", "Pillsbury Dough Boy", "The Human Refrigerator", "The Flying Coke Machine", "The Crisco Kid", "Boy Gorge"
- Harrison Barnes – "The Black Falcon",
- Jim Barnes – "Bad News"
- Marvin Barnes – "Bad News" (originally because of his basketball skills but later because of his frequent off-court issues)
- Scottie Barnes – ”Scottier Barney”
- Dick Barnett – "Fall Back Baby"
- Rowan Alexander Barrett Jr. – "RJ"
- Brent Barry – "Bones"
- Jerry Baskerville – "Hound"
- Bradley Beal – "Big Panda"
- Alfred Beard – "Butch"
- Michael Beasley – "B-Easy" "Big Mike", "Super Cool Beas"
- Marco Belinelli – "Beli"
- Walt Bellamy – "Bells"
- Gursimrana Singh Bhullar – "Sim"
- Chauncey Billups – "Mr. Big Shot"
- Larry Bird – "The Great White Hope" "The Hick from French Lick", "Larry Legend", "Uncle Larry"
- Bismack Biyombo – "Bizzy Bo", "The Acrobatic from the Democratic (Republic of the Congo)" "BB-8", "Biznation", "Big Bizness"
- Daron Blaylock – "Mookie"
- Eric Bledsoe – "The Bledshow"
- Tyrone Bogues – "Muggsy"
- Devin Booker – "Book", "D-Book"
- Chris Bosh – "CB4", "The Boshtrich",
- Chris Boucher – "Slimm Duck"
- Bill Bradley – "Dollar Bill", "The Secretary of State", "Mr. President"
- Shawn Bradley – "The Enormous Mormon"
- Ignas Brazdeikis – "Iggy"
- Mikal Bridges – "The Warden" "Brooklyn Bridges"
- Jon Brockman – "The Brockness Monster" (because he was rarely seen in games)
- Fred Brown – "Downtown Freddie" (for his proficiency in the 3-point basket, "from downtown")
- Jalen Brunson – "Captain Clutch", "King of New York"
- Joe Bryant – "Jellybean"
- Kobe Bryant – "Black Mamba", "KB-24", "Vino"
- Jimmy Butler – "Jimmy Buckets", "Jimmy Jordan" (due to multiple historic playoff runs, his resemblance to Michael Jordan, and conspiracy theories that he is actually Jordan's son)
- D. J. Burns- The "Buuuuurn", "Big Boy", "Beast Boy"

=== C ===
- Joe Caldwell – "Pogo", "Jumping Joe"
- Kentavious Caldwell-Pope – "KCP"
- Brian Cardinal – "The Custodian"
- Antoine Carr – "Big Dawg"
- Joe Barry Carroll –"Joe Barely Cares", "Just Barely Carroll"
- Vince Carter – "Vinsanity", "Old Man Vince", "Air Canada", "Half Man Half Amazing", "VC"
- Michael Carter-Williams – MCW
- Alex Caruso – "The Bald Mamba", "Carushow"
- Sam Cassell – "Sam I Am", "The Space-man"
- Wilt Chamberlain – "Wilt the Stilt", "The Big Dipper" (because as a child he had to '"dip" his head after hitting it on a door frame)
- Derrick Chievous – "Band-Aid" (who wore one for good luck)
- Nathaniel Clifton – "Sweetwater"
- Craig Claxton – "Speedy"
- Vernal Coles – "Bimbo"
- Mike Conley - "Bite Bite"
- DeMarcus Cousins – "Boogie"
- Bob Cousy – "The Houdini of the Hardwood", "Cooz"
- Forrest Cox – "Frosty"
- John Arthur Cox III – "Chubby"
- Jamal Crawford – "J Crossover", "Crawssover Crawford" "L.A.'s Dance Instructor", "Mr And-One"
- Billy Cunningham – "Kangaroo Kid"
- Stephen Curry – "Splash Brothers" (Curry and Klay Thompson), "Baby-Faced Assassin", "Chef Curry", "Steph", "The Golden Boy"

=== D ===
- Bob Dandridge – "Bobby D"
- Dyson Daniels - "The Great Barrier Thief"
- Anthony Davis - "Brow", "AD", "Glass", "Day-to-day Davis" (for his propensity for injuries)
- Mel Davis – "Killer"
- Glen Davis – "Big Baby", "Uno-Uno"
- Ricky Davis – "Ricky Buckets", "Get Buckets", Grits 'N Gravy, Wrong Rim Ricky
- Walter Davis – "The Greyhound", "The Candyman", "Sweet D" and "The Man with the Velvet Touch"
- Darryl Dawkins – "Chocolate Thunder"
- Dewayne Dedmon – "The Mechanic"
- Matthew Dellavedova – "Delly" "The Curry Stopper"
- DeMar DeRozan – "Deebo"
- Dimitris Diamantidis – "3D"
- Boris Diaw – "Tea Time"
- Josh Dix – "John Chips", "JD", "Jelly"
- Luka Dončić – "Luka Magic", "The Don",
- Luguentz Dort – "Dorture Chamber", "Dortress"
- Clyde Drexler – "Clyde the Glide"
- Goran Dragic – "The Dragon", "Gold Dragon"
- Andre Drummond – "Big Penguin"
- Tim Duncan – "The Big Fundamental" (for his fundamentally sound game), "Slam Duncan", "Old Man Riverwalk", "Twin Towers" (with David Robinson)
- Kevin Durant – "KD", "Durantula", "The Servant", "Slim Reaper", "Easy Money Sniper", "Snake"

=== E ===
- Anthony Edwards – "Ant-Man", "Ant"
- Theodore Edwards – "Blue" (from an older sister, for the color of his face when he was choking as a baby)
- Pervis Ellison – "Never Nervous Pervis" (during his college days), "Out of Service Pervis" (for his frequent injuries in the NBA)
- Joel Embiid – "The Process", a self-adopted nickname from a rebuilding process of the 76ers pushed by Sam Hinkie
- Julius Erving – "Dr. J", The Doctor
- Patrick Ewing – "The Beast of the East"

=== F ===
- Kahlil Ameer Felder Jr. – "Kay"
- Derek Fisher – "D-Fish"
- Eric Floyd – "Sleepy"
- De'Aaron Fox – "Swipa"
- Clarence Francis – "Bevo"
- Steve Francis – "Stevie Franchise"
- Walt Frazier – "Clyde" (after the film Bonnie and Clyde, due to his flamboyant clothes)
- James Taft Fredette – "Jimmer", "The Lonely Master", "Jimo Dashen", "The Lonely God"
- Lloyd Bernard Free – "World", "World B. Free", "The Prince of Midair"
- Markelle Fultz – "Quick Wash"

=== G ===
- Aaron Gordon – "Air Gordon",
- Dan Gadzuric – "The Flying Dutchman",
- Harry Gallatin – "The Horse"
- Danilo Gallinari – "Il Gallo", "The Rooster"
- Kevin Garnett – "Big Ticket", "KG", "The Kid"
- Marc Gasol – "Big Spain", "The Big Burrito"
- Paul George – "PG-13", "Young Trece", "Playoff P", "Podcast P", "Pandemic P" (After performing poorly in the 2020 NBA playoffs)
- George Gervin – "The Iceman", "Iceberg Slim", just "Ice"
- Daniel Gibson – "Boobie"
- Shai Gilgeous-Alexander – "SGA" "Mr. Buy 2 Get 1 Free"
- Armen Gilliam – "The Hammer"
- Artis Gilmore – "A Train"
- Manu Ginóbili – "The Magician", "Gino", "El Contusione", "Manudona"
- George Glamack – "The Blind Bomber" (his eyesight was so poor that he had to look at the court lines to determine how hard to shoot).
- Rudy Gobert – "The Stifle Tower", "The French Rejection"
- Ben Gordon – "Madison Square Gordon"
- Marcin Gortat – "The Polish Hammer"
- Travis Grant – "Machine Gun"
- Draymond Green "Day-Day", "The Dancing Bear", "Dray"
- Jeff Green – "Iron Man", "Uncle Jeff",
- Darrell Griffith – "Dr. Dunkenstein"
- Robert Gruenig – "Ace"
- Tom Gugliotta – "Googs",

=== H ===
- Harold Hairston – "Happy"
- Harvey Wade Halbrook – "Swede"
- Tyrese Haliburton - "The Haliban"
- Richard Hamilton – "Rip"
- Tom Hammonds – "The Terminator"
- Anfernee Hardaway – "Penny" (from his grandmother's Southern accent calling him "pretty")
- Tyler Hansbrough – "Psycho T"
- James Harden – "The Beard", "El Chapo"
- Tobias Harris – "Tobi & Bobi" (with Boban Marjanović after they remained teammates in three separate organizations due to being packaged together in trade agreements)
- Isaiah Hartenstein – "Hartenstein's Monster"
- Connie Hawkins – "The Hawk"
- Udonis Haslem – "U.D."
- John Havlicek – "Hondo" (from Mel Nowell, because of Havlicek's interest in Western novels and looking like John Wayne in the film)
- Elvin Hayes – "The Big E", "E", "The Big Enigma"
- Tommy Heinsohn – "Ack Ack" (from the sound of a machine gun, since Heinsohn "never met a shot he didn't like or wouldn't take"), "Tommy Gun", "Heinie",
- Juan Hernangómez – "Juancho", "Bo Cruz", "Cruz Missile"
- Tyler Herro – "Baby Goat", "Boy Wonder"
- Mario Hezonja – "Super Mario"
- Buddy Hield – "Buddy Love"
- Grant Hill – "G", "G-money"
- Darnell Hillman – "Dr. Dunk"
- Charlie Hoefer – "Dutch"
- Fred Hoiberg – "The Mayor"; given to him by his Iowa State teammates because of his extraordinary popularity in the school's home city of Ames, Iowa, where he was raised
- Lionel Hollins – "(The) L-Train"
- Chet Holmgren – "Big Oxtail", "Abraham Lincoln"
- William Holzman – "Red"
- Robert Horry – "Big Shot Rob" or "Big Shot Bob"
- Dwight Howard – "Superman", "Foul on You", (for the large number of fouls called on Howard during the 2010 NBA Playoffs), "D12"
- Kevin Huerter – "Red Velvet"
- Rodney Hundley – "Hot Rod"
- Nah'Shon Hyland "Bones"

=== I ===
- Serge Ibaka – "I-block-a", "Serge Protector", "Air Congo"
- Andre Iguodala – "Iggy"
- Zydrunas Ilgauskas – "Big Z"
- Ersan İlyasova – "Turkish Thunder", "Ghostface Ilya"
- Brandon Ingram – "B.I.", "Sleepy Reaper" (for his similar physical build to Kevin "Slim Reaper" Durant plus his naturally heavy-lidded countenance)
- Kyrie Irving – "Uncle Drew", "Kyriediculous", "The Ankletaker"
- Jonathan Isaac – "The Minister of Defense"
- Allen Iverson – "A.I.", "The Answer", "Bubba Chuck", "Steven John Ray the Third"

=== J ===
- LeBron James – "King James", "The King", "The Chosen One", "(The) L-Train", "LBJ" "The Akron Hammer", "LeBronto", Bron Bron", "Unc"
- Richard Lee Jemison III – "Trey"
- Keith Jennings – "Mister"
- Earvin Johnson – "Magic", "Buck", "E.J."
- Gus Johnson – "Honeycomb"
- Joe Johnson – "Iso Joe"
- Larry Johnson – "Grandmama" (from his role in a series of Converse commercials in which he portrayed his own grandmother) "LJ"
- Vinnie Johnson – "The Microwave" ("gets hot instantly")
- Nikola Jokić – "Joker"
- Isaiah Joe – "Strokin’ Joe", "Zai"
- Damon Jones – "The World's Greatest Shooter"
- Ronald Jones – "Popeye"
- Sam Jones – "Sad Sam", "Mr. Clutch", "The Shooter"
- Michael Jordan – "Air Jordan", "His Airness", "MJ", "The G.O.A.T", "The Black Cat"

=== K ===
- Greg Kelser – "Special K"
- Shawn Kemp – "The Reignman" "The Family Man"
- John Graham Kerr – "Red"
- Jason Kidd – "J-Kidd"
- Andrei Kirilenko – "AK47"
- Louis Herman Klotz – "Red"
- Dalton Knecht – "Kneckt 4"
- Kon Knueppel – "The Konman"
- Furkan Korkmaz – "Furk the Turk"
- Toni Kukoc – "Croatian Sensation", "The Waiter", "Euro-Magic"
- Michael Kidd-Gilchrist – "MKG"
- Jonathan Kuminga – "The Kum Bucket"

=== L ===
- Trajan Langdon – "The Alaskan Assassin"
- Meadow George Lemon – "Meadowlark"
- Lafayette Lever – "Fat"
- Kawhi Leonard – "The Claw", "Sugar K"
- Meyers Leonard – "Meyers Legend"
- Nancy Lieberman – "Lady Magic"
- Damian Lillard – "Dame Dolla", "Sub Zero", "Logo Lillard", "Dame Time"
- Jeremy Lin – "Linsanity"
- Shaun Livingston – "Mid-Range Assassin"
- Jim Loscutoff – "Jungle Jim",
- Brook Lopez – "Splash Mountain"
- Robin Lopez – "RoLo"
- Bob Love – "Butterbean"

=== M ===
- Ed Macauley – "Easy", "Easy Ed"
- Mark Madsen – "Mad Dog"
- Dan Majerle – "Thunder Dan"
- Karl Malone – "The Mailman", "The Nasty Man", "Mr. 13"
- Moses Malone – "Chairman of the Boards"
- Earl Manigault – "The Goat"
- Pete Maravich – "Pistol Pete"
- Stephon Marbury – "Starbury"
- Boban Marjanović – "Bobi & Tobi" (with Tobias Harris after they remained teammates in three separate organizations due to being packaged together in trade agreements)
- Kenyon Martin – "K-Mart"
- Kenyon Martin Jr. – "KJ"
- Patrick Donald Martin – "Dino"
- Shawn Marion – "The Matrix"
- Wesley Matthews – "Iron Man"
- Cedric Maxwell – "Cornbread" (after the title character in the film Cornbread, Earl and Me)
- Luc Mbah a Moute "The Prince", "Moute Kicks Boute"
- Miles McBride – "Deuce"
- Xavier McDaniel – "The X-Man"; (play on the initial of his first name with the X-Men, a group of superheroes)
- Antonio McDyess – "Dice"
- Jon McGlocklin – "Jonny Mac"
- Tracy McGrady – "T-Mac"
- Dick McGuire – "Tricky Dick",
- Kevin McHale – "Herman Munster", "The Black Hole" (because of his interest in shooting, once balls were passed to him, they never came back)
- Dean Meminger – "The Dream"
- Sam Merrill- "Money Merrill" "Sammy Buckets"
- Jordan Mickey – J-Mick
- Darko Miličić – "The Human Victory Cigar", because his court appearances were at the end of routs. The first to have this nickname was Stojko Vranković.
- Reggie Miller – "The Knick Killer"
- Malik Milton – "Shake"
- George Mikan – "Mr. Basketball", "The Big Number"
- Harold Miner – "Baby Jordan"
- Josh Minott – "Lawn Mower"
- Bill Mlkvy – "The Owl without a Vowel"
- Donovan Mitchell – "Spida"
- Sidney Moncrief – "Sid the Squid", "Sir Sid", "El Sid"
- Earl Monroe – "Black Magic", "Earl the Pearl", "Black Jesus"
- Greg Monroe – "Moose"
- E'Twaun Moore – "Uncle E"
- Mario Morales - "Quijote"
- Ja Morant - "G12", "Ja Warrant" "Ja Wick" "Ja Dropper"
- Marcus Morris – "Mook"
- Alonzo Mourning – "Zo"
- Charles Murphy – "Stretch"
- Jamal Murray – "The Blue Arrow"
- Gheorghe Mureșan – "The Giant"
- Dikembe Mutombo – "Mt. Mutombo"

=== N ===
- Steve Nash – "Hair Canada"
- Fred Neal – "Curly"
- Jameer Nelson – "Mighty Mouse", "Crib Midget"
- Georges Niang – "The Minivan", "G Wagon"
- Dirk Nowitzki – "Tall Baller From The G", "Dirty", "The German Racecar", "Bavarian Bomber", "Dirk Diggler", "The Berlin Tall", "German Wunderkind", "Dirk Savage", "The Germinator", "The Big German"
- Jusuf Nurkić – "The Bosnian Beast"
- Frank Ntilikina – "The French Prince"

=== O ===
- Jahlil Okafor – "Jah", "Big J", "Little Sully"
- Lamar Odom – "The Candy Man", L.O
- Mehmet Okur – "Memo", "The Moneyman"
- Ralph O'Brien – "Buckshot"
- Shaquille O'Neal – "Shaq", "Shaq Daddy", "Diesel", "The Big Aristotle", "Superman", "MDE" (Most Dominant Ever), "The Big Maravich", "The Big Fella", "The Big Shaqtus", "Shaq Attack" "The Shnaq"
- Jermaine O'Neal – "J.O"
- Hakeem Olajuwon – "The Dream"
- Michael Olowokandi – "Kandi Man"
- Jose Ortiz - "Piculin"
- Kelly Oubre Jr. – "Wave Papi"

=== P ===
- Smush Parker – "Scrub"
- Robert Parish – "The Chief" (after the mute, expressionless character in One Flew Over the Cuckoo's Nest)
- Ruben Patterson – "The Kobe Stopper"
- Chris Paul – "CP3", "The Point God"
- Billy Paultz – "The Whopper"
- Gary Payton – "GP", "The Glove"
- Gary Payton II – "The Mitten"
- Sam Perkins – "Big Smooth", "Sleepy Sam"
- Elliot Perry – "Socks" (because he always wore his socks to his knees)
- Chuck Person – "The Rifleman" (whose full name is Chuck Connors Person, because his mom was a fan of The Rifleman).
- Paul Pierce – "The Truth"
- Ricky Pierce – "Big Paper Daddy"
- Mason Plumlee – "Plumdog Millionaire"
- Jim Pollard – "Kangaroo Kid"
- Kevin Porter – "Little Drummer Boy"
- Kristaps Porziņģis – "KP", "Unicorn", "Tingus Pingus" (due to Michael Rapaport, a diehard New York Knicks fan, calling him "Tingus Pingus" in the 2015 NBA Draft)
- Vitaly Potapenko – "Ukraine Train"
- Joel Przybilla – "Vanilla Gorilla"

=== R ===
- Julius Randle – "The Black Panther", "Beyblade"
- Zach Randolph – "Z-Bo"
- Austin Reaves – "Hillbilly Kobe", "AR-15"
- Paul Reed – "BBall Paul"
- Bryant Reeves – "Big Country"
- Jerome Richardson – "Pooh"
- Mitch Richmond – "The Rock"
- Mike Riordan – "Rags"
- Rajon Rondo – "Johnny", "Swag", "Fedex", "Chris Paul" (coming from a viral video of a fan mistaking Rondo for Paul)
- Glenn Rivers – "Doc"
- David Robinson – "The Admiral" (for his stint in the U.S. Navy)
- Glenn Robinson – "Big Dog"
- Len Robinson – "Truck"
- Nate Robinson – "KryptoNate"
- Oscar Robertson – "The Big O" (coming from the James Thurber story, "The Disappearing O")
- Dennis Rodman – "The Worm" (for his wriggling when he played pinball)
- Sergio Rodríguez -"El Chacho"
- Wayne Rollins – "Tree"
- Derrick Rose – "D-Rose", "Windy City Assassin"
- Brandon Roy – "The Natural"
- Terry Rozier – "Scary Terry"
- D'Angelo Russell – "DLo"
- Bill Russell – "Russ"

=== S ===
- Arvydas Sabonis – "Sabas"
- Domantas Sabonis – "Sabas Jr.", "Domas"
- John Salley – "Spider"
- Tom Sanders – "Satch" or "Satch Sanders"
- Brian Scalabrine – "The White Mamba"
- Oscar Schmidt – "Mão Santa" (Portuguese for "Holy Hand")
- Sofoklis Schortsanitis – "Baby Shaq", "Big Sofo"
- Luis Scola – "Ice Cream Man"
- Jon Scheyer – "The Jewish Jordan"
- Detlef Schrempf – Det The Threat"
- Dennis Scott – "3D"
- Collin Sexton – "Young Bull"
- Iman Shumpert – "Shump"
- Pascal Siakam – "Spicy P"
- Ralph Siewert – "Sky", and later "Timber"
- James Silas – "Captain Late" (because he was at his best near the end of games), "The Snake", "The Late Mr. Silas"
- Jonathon Simmons – "Juice"
- Henry Sims – "Lickface"
- Ben Simmons – "Fresh Prince", "Big Ben", "Ben 10"
- Marcus Smart – "The Cobra"
- Bobby Smith – "Bingo"
- Craig Smith – "Rhino"
- Josh Smith – "J-Smoove"
- Kenny Smith – "The Jet"
- J. R. Smith – "JR Swish"
- Larry Smith – "Mr. Mean"
- Rik Smits – "The Flying Dutchman" or "The Dunkin' Dutchman"
- Vassilis Spanoulis – "Kill Bill", "V-Span"
- Marreese Speights – "Mo' Buckets"
- Latrell Sprewell – "Spree"
- Jerry Stackhouse – "Stack", "House"
- Dave Stallworth – "The Rave"
- Nik Stauskas – "Sauce Castillo"
- Lance Stephenson – "Born Ready"
- Isaiah Stewart – "Beef Stew"
- Maurice Stokes – "Big Mo"
- Amar'e Stoudemire – "STAT" (Standing Tall and Talented)
- Predrag Stojakovic – "Peja"
- Paul Sturgess – "Tiny"

=== T ===
- Yuta Tabuse – "Michael Jordan Of Japan"
- Jayson Tatum – "The Anomaly"ˆ
- Reece Tatum – "Goose"
- Walter Samuel Tavares da Veiga – "Edy"
- Dalen Terry – "Sevens"
- Jason Terry – "JET" (his initials)
- Isaiah Thomas – "IT"
- Isiah Thomas (born 1961) – "Zeke", "Cuts" (for the cuts he would suffer while driving the lane), "The Baby-Faced Assassin" (for his young appearance contrasted with his shooting skill)
- Kurt Thomas – "Mid Life", "Dirty Kurt", "Big Sexy"
- David Thompson – "The Skywalker"
- Klay Thompson – "Splash Brothers" (Thompson and Stephen Curry), "Game 6 Klay"
- Nate Thurmond – "Nate The Great"
- Sedale Threatt – "The Thief"
- Andrew Toney – "The Boston Strangler" (because he kept "killing" the Boston Celtics in big games)
- Obadiah Richard Toppin Jr. – "Obi"
- Karl-Anthony Towns – "KAT", "Special-K", "The Big Meow", "The Big Bodega"
- Robert Traylor – "Tractor Traylor"
- Anthony Leon Tucker Jr. – "PJ"
- Melvin Turpin – "Golden Arches"

=== V ===
- Jonas Valančiūnas – "JV", "Lithuanian Lightning"
- Denzel Valentine – "Zel"
- Nick Van Exel – "Nasty Nick", "Nick Van Excellent", "Nick the Quick"
- Anderson Varejão – "Wild Thing"
- Stojko Vranković – "Human Victory Cigar", because he played at the end of blowout games where Red Auerbach would light his cigar.
- Dick Van Arsdale – "The Original Sun"
- Nikola Vučević – "Vooch"
- Aleksandar Vujacic – "Sasha"

=== W ===
- Dwyane Wade – "D-Wade", "Flash"
- Kemba Walker – "Cardiac Kemba"
- Ben Wallace – "Big Ben"lou
- Gerald Wallace – "Crash", "G-Force"
- Rasheed Wallace – "Sheed"
- Anthony Jerome Webb – "Spud"
- Chris Webber – "C-Webb"
- Victor Wembanyama - "Wemby", "Alien"
- Jerry West – "Mr. Clutch", "The Logo" (because he was incorporated into the NBA Logo)
- Russell Westbrook – "Russ", "Brodie", "Beastbrook"
- Derrick White – "The Buffalo", "D-White"
- Aaron Wiggins – "Wiggs", "The Man Who Saved Basketball"
- Andrew Wiggins – "Maple Jordan"
- Dominique Wilkins – "The Human Highlight Film"
- Jamaal Wilkes – "Silk"
- Deron Williams – "D-Will"
- Jalen Williams – "J-Dub"
- Jason Williams – "White Chocolate"
- Jaylin Williams – "Jay Will", "Boom"
- John Williams – "Hot Rod"
- Jerome Williams – "Junkyard Dog"
- John Sam Williams – "Hot Plate"
- Kenrich Williams – "Kenny Hustle"
- Lou Williams – "Sweet Lou"
- Robert Williams – "Time Lord"
- Corliss Williamson – "Big Nasty"
- James Worthy – "Big Game James", "Clever"

=== Y ===
- Guerschon Yabusele – "The Dancing Bear"
- Yao Ming – "Ming Dynasty", "Chairman Yao", "Shaquie Chan", "The Great Wall of China"
- Nick Young – "Swaggy P" , "Uncle P", "Bean Burrito"
- Trae Young – "Ice Trae"

=== Z ===
- Max Zaslofsky – "Slats"

== Coaches ==
- Arnold Auerbach – "Red"
- Mike Budenholzer - "Coach Bud"
- Forrest Cox – "Frosty", "Forrest Grump"
- Chuck Daly – "Daddy Rich"
- Clarence Gaines – "Big House"
- Fred Hoiberg – "The Mayor"
- William Holzman – "Red"
- Dan Issel – "The Horse"
- Phil Jackson – "Zen Master"
- Alvin Julian – "Doggie"
- Mike Krzyzewski – "Coach K"
- Ward Lambert – "Piggy" (because he wore his hair in pigtails as a youngster)
- Joe Mazzulla - "Psycho Joe"
- Don Nelson – "Nellie"
- Gregg Popovich – "Pop"
- Pat Riley – "Riles"
- Glenn Rivers – "Doc"
- Erik Spoelstra – "Spo"
- Tom Thibodeau - "Thibs"
- John Wooden – "The Wizard of Westwood" (as a coach)
- Rick Carlisle – "Flipper"

== Teams ==
=== College ===
- Saint Joseph's Hawks men's basketball, 1934–38 – "Mighty Mites"
- Utah Utes men's basketball team, 1943–44 – "Blitz Kids" (freshmen Arnie Ferrin, Herb Wilkinson, Wat Misaka, Bob Lewis, Dick Smuin, Bill Kastlic and sophomore Fred Sheffield)
- Kentucky Wildcats men's basketball in the late 1940s – "Fabulous Five" (Alex Groza, Ralph Beard, Wallace Jones, Cliff Barker and Ken Rollins).
- University of Houston men's basketball from 1982 to 1984 – "Phi Slama Jama" (led by Hakeem Olajuwon and Clyde Drexler)
- Michigan Wolverines men's basketball team, 1992–93 – "Fab Five" (Chris Webber, Jalen Rose, Juwan Howard, Jimmy King, Ray Jackson)
- Kentucky Wildcats men's basketball team, 1995–96 – "The Untouchables" (Tony Delk, Antoine Walker)
- University of Illinois men's basketball from 1988 to 1989 – "Flyin' Illini" (led by Kenny Battle, Nick Anderson, Kendall Gill, and Stephen Bardo)

=== Professional ===
- Boston Celtics
  - "The Big Three" (Larry Bird, Kevin McHale and Robert Parish)
  - "The Boston Three Party" (Ray Allen, Kevin Garnett and Paul Pierce, a.k.a. "The Big Three")
- Chicago Bulls
  - "The Greatest Team of All Time" (Finished the 1995–1996 NBA Season with 72 wins and 10 losses) 1995–96 Chicago Bulls season (Scottie Pippen, Ron Harper, Dennis Rodman, Luc Longley, Michael Jordan)
- Dallas Mavericks
  - "The Big Three" (Steve Nash, Dirk Nowitzki and Michael Finley)
  - "Triple J" (Jamal Mashburn, Jason Kidd and Jimmy Jackson)
- Detroit Pistons – The "Bad Boys" (The Bad Boys employs extreme physical style of play and psychological warfare against enemy teams. Arguably the Bad Boys are famous for having the greatest defense in the NBA and holds the record for most brawl fights in the NBA during 1986 up to 1991)
  - "The Bad Boys" (the Original from 1986 to 1991) – Isiah Thomas (Zeke / The Captain), Bill Laimbeer (The Black Hat / The Darth Vader of the NBA), Joe Dumars (Mister Louisiana), Rick Mahorn (The Baddest Bad Boy of Them All / The Master of Being Bad), Vinnie Johnson (The Microwave), John Salley (The Spider), Dennis Rodman (The Worm / The Rebound King), James Edwards (Buddha), Mark Aguirre (The Outlaw from Dallas), John Long (The Prolific Piston Scorer), Micheal Williams (Mister Free Throws), Fennis Dembo (The Cowboy)
- Golden State Warriors
  - "The Dubs" (short for double-u, as in "The Ws")
  - "Splash Brothers" (Stephen Curry & Klay Thompson starting in 2012)
  - "Death Lineup" (Stephen Curry, Klay Thompson, Draymond Green, Andre Iguodala, and Harrison Barnes, who was later replaced by Kevin Durant. The version with Durant is also known as the "Hampton's Five")
  - "Run TMC" (after the hip-hop group Run–D.M.C., for Tim Hardaway, Mitch Richmond and Chris Mullin during the 1990s)
- Houston Rockets
  - "Twin Towers" (Hakeem Olajuwon and Ralph Sampson)
- Los Angeles Clippers
  - "Lob City" (2012–2017, Blake Griffin, Chris Paul, DeAndre Jordan)
- Los Angeles Lakers,
  - During the 1980s – "Showtime"
- Memphis Grizzlies
  - "Grit & Grind" (2010–2017, Zach Randolph "Z-Bo", Tony Allen "The Grindfather", Marc Gasol, Mike Conley)
- Miami Heat
  - "The Heatles" (LeBron James, Dwyane Wade, Chris Bosh)
  - "7-Eleven" (Dion Waiters and Goran Dragic)
- New York Knicks
  - "The Villanova Knicks" (2024-2024, Jalen Brunson, Josh Hart, Mikal Bridges and Donte DiVencenzo)
- Oklahoma City Thunder
  - "'Stache Brothers" (Steven Adams and Enes Kanter, because of their moustache)
- Philadelphia 76ers
  - "The Process" (2013–2025)
- Portland Trail Blazers
  - "Jail Blazers" (for their players’ off-the-court troubles in the early to mid 2000s), "Rip City" (the city of Portland)
- San Antonio Spurs
  - "The Twin Towers" (1998–2003, Tim Duncan and David Robinson)
  - "The Big Three" (Tim Duncan, Manu Ginóbili and Tony Parker)

=== International ===
- United States men's national basketball team, 1992 – "The Dream Team"
- United States men's national basketball team, 2008 – "The Redeem Team"
- Canada men's national basketball team – "The Road Warriors"
- Spain national basketball team – La ÑBA
- Turkey national basketball team – Oniki Dev Adam ("12 Giant Men")
- Australia men's national basketball team – "The Boomers"
- Australia women's national basketball team – "The Opals"
- New Zealand men's national basketball team — "The Tall Blacks"

== Locations ==
- Air Canada Centre – "The Hangar", "Jurassic Park"
- American Airlines Center – "The Hangar"
- American Airlines Arena – "Triple-A"
- Gainbridge Fieldhouse – "The Fieldhouse"
- Charlotte Coliseum – "The Hive"
- Chase Center – "The Gatehouse" (Name of the front entrance to the stadium) (Warriors moving from Oracle Arena as of 2019/2020 season)
- Chesapeake Energy Arena – "Loud City"
- Chicago Stadium – "The Madhouse on Madison (Street)"
- Crypto.com Arena – "The Crypt"
- FedExForum – "The Grindhouse"
- Alico Arena – Dunk City
- Human Performance Center – "Chamber of Horrors"
- Izod Center – "The Meadowlands", "The Swamp"
- Key Arena – "The Key"
- Madison Square Garden – "MSG", "The Mecca", "The Garden"
- Quicken Loans Arena – "The Q"
- Pepsi Center – "The Can"
- Philips Arena – "The Highlight Factory"
- TD Garden, Boston Garden – "The Garden"
- Time Warner Cable Arena – "The Cable Box"
- United Center – "The UC", "Madhouse on Madison", "The House that Jordan Built"
- US Airways Center – "The Purple Palace"
- Verizon Center – "The Phone Booth"

== See also ==
- List of athletes by nickname
- Lists of nicknames – nickname list articles on Wikipedia
- List of NFL nicknames
- List of baseball nicknames
