= Knowlton, Iowa =

- Extinct Hamlet
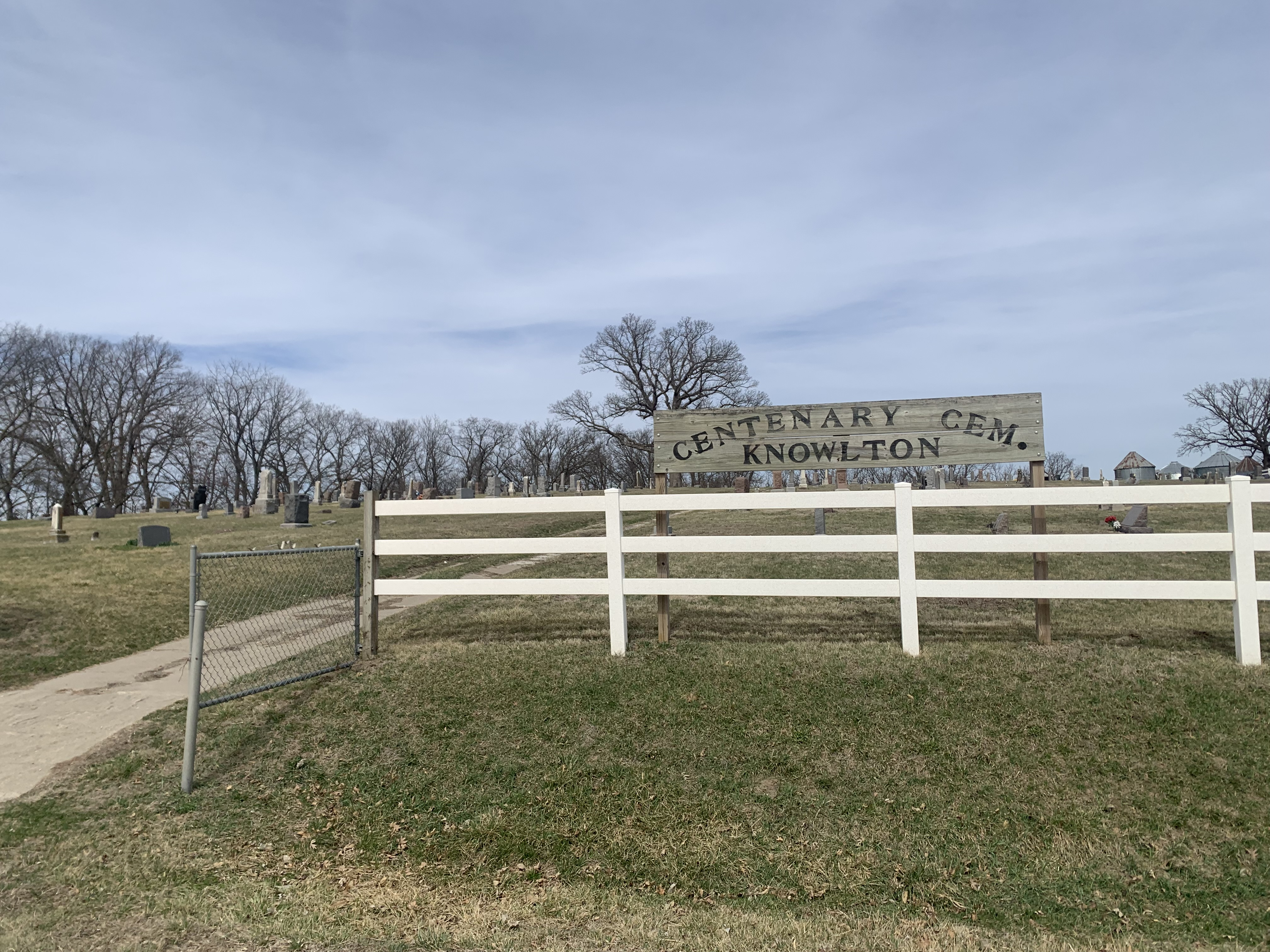
- Centenary Cemetery at Knowlton, Iowa

- Location within Iowa
- Coordinates: 40°49′35″N 94°19′56″W
- Country: United States
- State: Iowa
- County: Ringgold
- Elevation: 1,142 ft (348 m)
- Time zone: UTC-6 (Central (CST))
  - Summer (DST): UTC-5 (CDT)
- Area code: 641
- GNIS feature ID: 464605

Knowlton is an extinct hamlet and former city in Ringgold County, Iowa, United States. Knowlton is located at the intersection of county highways J23 and P33, 1.3 miles (2.1 km) north of Diagonal.

== History ==
At one point Knowlton was named "Indianville" because it was close to a Native American village. When the Great Western Railroad expanded its line in 1887, the town Knowlton was established. Knowlton was re-named after the president of the railroad, Dexter Asa Knowlton. The post office opened in 1888. By 1898, there were two churches, hotels, a new school, stores, a mill, and a foundry. The census showed a population of 273 in 1905.

On July 6, 1895, a fire broke out between the houses of two townspeople. Investigation into the origins of the fire found the source of the fires to be undetermined. An article appeared in the newspaper on August 25, 1895 announcing that it was likely arson committed by a resident of Diagonal, as the towns had a rivalry.

The population of Knowlton declined after a new rail line came through Diagonal, and many people moved to the rival town. Eventually when the Great Western Railroad withdrew its support, Knowlton became a ghost town. Knowlton's post office was closed in 1921 and the town became unincorporated in 1926.

== Notable person ==
- Yam Yaryan, Major League Baseball catcher, was born in Knowlton.
