= Afeez =

Afeez is a given name. Notable people with the name include:

- Afeez Agoro (1975–2023), Nigerian model, actor, and reality television personality
- Afeez Aremu (born 1999), Nigerian footballer
- Afeez Awakan (born 1993), Nigerian footballer
- Afeez Oyetoro (born 1963), Nigerian comic actor
