= Diagonal, Iowa =

- City
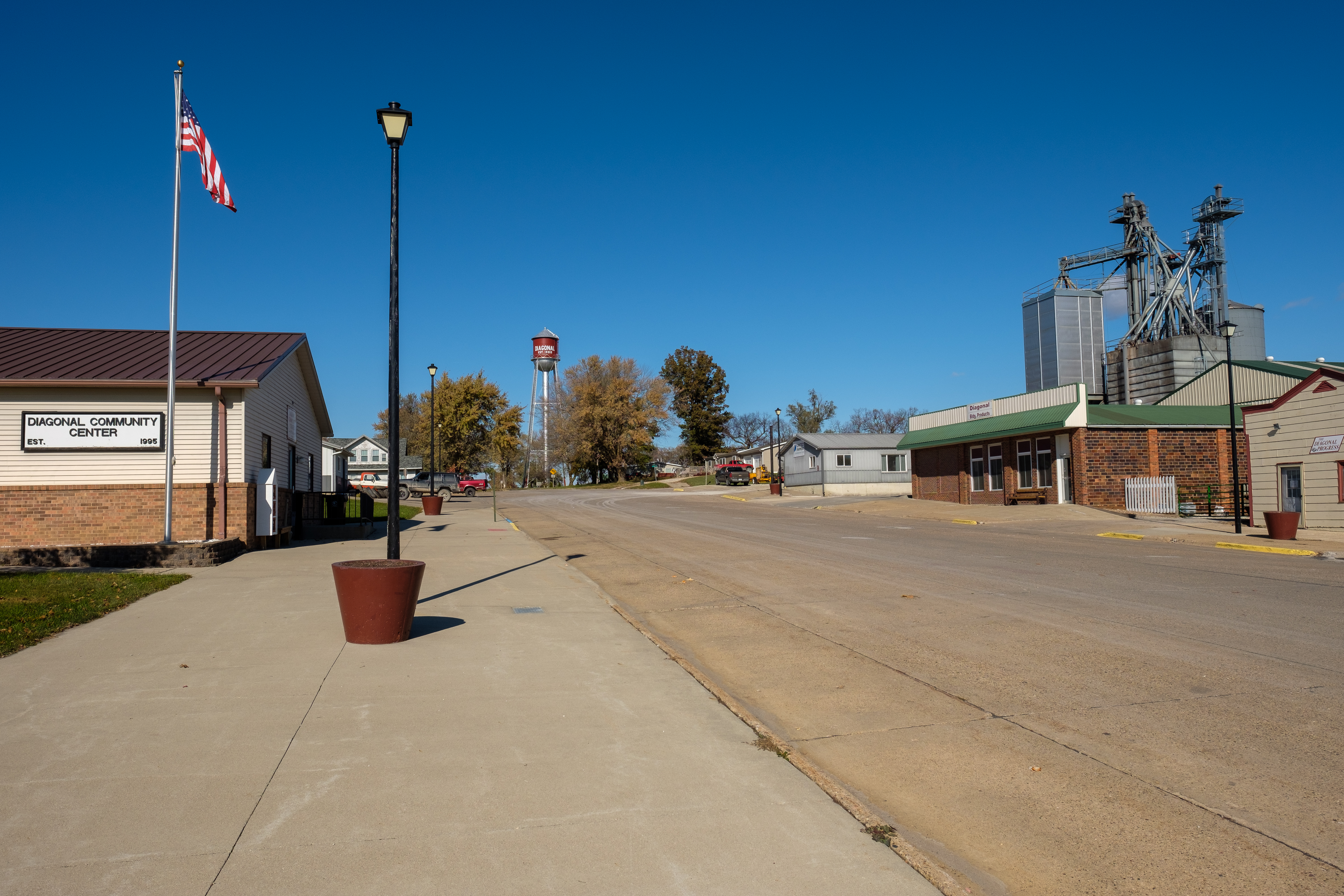
- Broadway Street

- Location of Diagonal, Iowa
- Coordinates: 40°48′38″N 94°20′31″W
- Country: USA
- State: Iowa
- County: Ringgold

Area
  - Total: 0.92 sq mi (2.37 km^{2})
  - Land: 0.91 sq mi (2.36 km^{2})
  - Water: 0 sq mi (0.00 km^{2})
- Elevation: 1,168 ft (356 m)

Population (2020)
  - Total: 344
  - Density: 376.8/sq mi (145.47/km^{2})
- Time zone: UTC-6 (Central (CST))
  - Summer (DST): UTC-5 (CDT)
- ZIP code: 50845
- Area code: 641
- FIPS code: 19-21270
- GNIS feature ID: 2394532

Diagonal is a city in northwest Ringgold County, Iowa, the United States. The population was 344 at the time of the 2020 census.

The community was named for the fact that two railroads intersected diagonally near the town site.

== Geography ==
Diagonal is located 5 miles west of US Route 169 and approximately eight miles northwest of Mount Ayr. The Grand River flows past the east side of the town.

According to the United States Census Bureau, the city has a total area of 0.90 square miles (2.33 km^{2}), all land.

== Demographics ==
Historical populations
Year	Pop.	±%
1900	383	—
1910	509	+32.9%
1920	569	+11.8%
1930	577	+1.4%
1940	603	+4.5%
1950	472	−21.7%
1960	443	−6.1%
1970	327	−26.2%
1980	362	+10.7%
1990	298	−17.7%
2000	312	+4.7%
2010	330	+5.8%
2020	344	+4.2%
Source:"U.S. Census website". United States Census Bureau. and Iowa Data Center; Source: U.S. Decennial Census

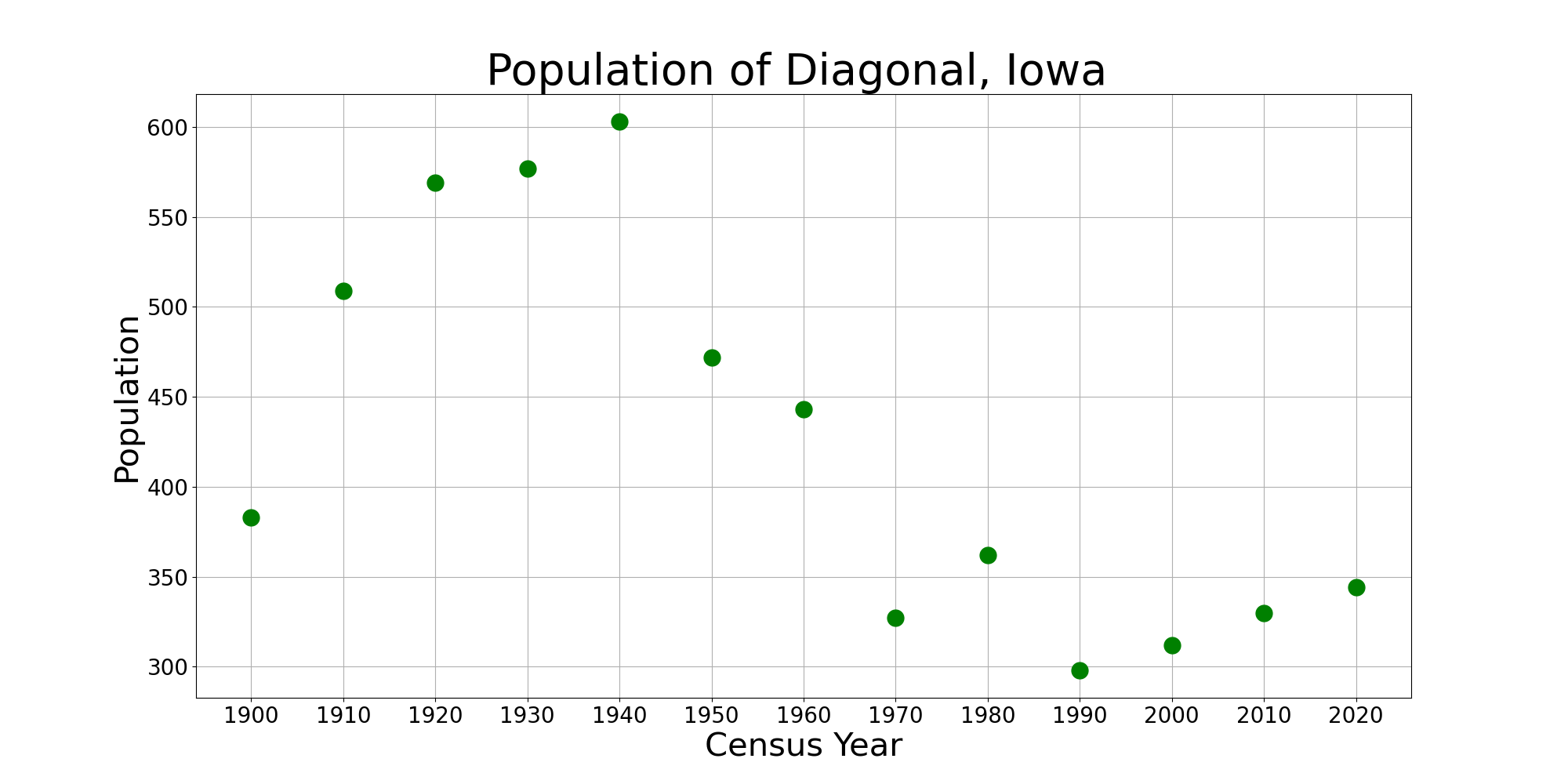
The population of Diagonal, Iowa from US census data

=== 2020 census ===
As of the census of 2020, there were 344 people, 115 households, and 73 families residing in the city. The population density was 376.8 inhabitants per square mile (145.5/km^{2}). There were 136 housing units at an average density of 149.0 per square mile (57.5/km^{2}). The racial makeup of the city was 93.0% White, 0.0% Black or African American, 0.6% Native American, 0.3% Asian, 0.0% Pacific Islander, 0.9% from other races and 5.2% from two or more races. Hispanic or Latino persons of any race comprised 0.9% of the population.

Of the 115 households, 36.5% of which had children under the age of 18 living with them, 42.6% were married couples living together, 7.0% were cohabitating couples, 24.3% had a female householder with no spouse or partner present and 26.1% had a male householder with no spouse or partner present. 36.5% of all households were non-families. 32.2% of all households were made up of individuals, 13.9% had someone living alone who was 65 years old or older.

The median age in the city was 41.7 years. 24.4% of the residents were under the age of 20; 5.2% were between the ages of 20 and 24; 22.1% were from 25 and 44; 16.6% were from 45 and 64; and 31.7% were 65 years of age or older. The gender makeup of the city was 49.7% male and 50.3% female.

=== 2010 census ===
As of the census of 2010, there were 330 people, 119 households, and 71 families living in the city. The population density was 366.7 inhabitants per square mile (141.6/km^{2}). There were 145 housing units at an average density of 161.1 per square mile (62.2/km^{2}). The racial makeup of the city was 97.9% White, 0.3% African American, and 1.8% Native American.

There were 119 households, of which 24.4% had children under the age of 18 living with them, 51.3% were married couples living together, 6.7% had a female householder with no husband present, 1.7% had a male householder with no wife present, and 40.3% were non-families. 37.0% of all households were made up of individuals, and 17.6% had someone living alone who was 65 years of age or older. The average household size was 2.13 and the average family size was 2.79.

The median age in the city was 52.8 years. 15.8% of residents were under the age of 18; 6.3% were between the ages of 18 and 24; 16.9% were from 25 to 44; 24.9% were from 45 to 64; and 36.1% were 65 years of age or older. The gender makeup of the city was 45.2% male and 54.8% female.

=== 2000 census ===
As of the census of 2000, there were 312 people, 139 households, and 87 families living in the city. The population density was 343.5 inhabitants per square mile (132.6/km^{2}). There were 154 housing units at an average density of 169.6 per square mile (65.5/km^{2}). The racial makeup of the city was 100.00% White.

There were 139 households, out of which 23.0% had children under the age of 18 living with them, 54.0% were married couples living together, 5.8% had a female householder with no husband present, and 36.7% were non-families. 31.7% of all households were made up of individuals, and 16.5% had someone living alone who was 65 years of age or older. The average household size was 2.24 and the average family size was 2.85.

21.2% were under the age of 18, 10.9% from 18 to 24, 25.3% from 25 to 44, 24.4% from 45 to 64, and 18.3% were 65 years of age or older. The median age was 40 years. For every 100 females, there were 92.6 males. For every 100 females age 18 and over, there were 87.8 males.

The median income for a household in the city was $24,063, and the median income for a family was $28,393. Males had a median income of $22,083 versus $18,958 for females. The per capita income for the city was $16,601. About 16.5% of families and 15.8% of the population were below the poverty line, including 23.7% of those under age 18 and 13.3% of those age 65 or over.

== Education ==
The school district is Diagonal Community School District.

== Notable people ==
- Dick Ives, University of Iowa Three Time All American basketball player
- Yam Yaryan, Chicago White Sox MLB baseball player, grew up near Diagonal

== See also ==
- W.J. Buck Polygonal Barn, listed on the National Register of Historic Places
