= W.J. Buck Polygonal Barn =

- Formerly listed on the U.S. National Register of Historic Places
- Location within Iowa Location within the United States
- Location: Off U.S. Route 169
- Nearest city: Diagonal, Iowa
- Coordinates: 40°46′57″N 94°15′25″W
- Built: 1907
- MPS: Iowa Round Barns: The Sixty Year Experiment TR
- NRHP reference No.: 86001471

Significant dates
- Added to NRHP: June 30, 1986
- Removed from NRHP: September 8, 2022

The W.J. Buck Polygonal Barn was a historical structure located near Diagonal in rural Ringgold County, Iowa, United States. It was built in 1907 and was listed on the National Register of Historic Places (NRHP) in 1986. The building measured 65 feet (20 m) around. The structure of the barn was basically a central octagon with a sectioned roof. Double pitch sheds surrounded the barn characterizing it as an encircling wing type. The central section was six-sided and the wing was nine-sided. The plan appears to be the same as the one for the Lloyd Z. Jones stock barn published in Wallaces' Farmer on January 16, 1903, and again on October 25, 1907, and June 17, 1910. It has subsequently been torn down. It was removed from the NRHP in 2022.
