= Tripp (nickname) =

Tripp is a nickname, commonly used for males who are third-generation namesakes. Notable people with the name include:

- Tripp Cromer (born 1967), American Baseball Player
- Tripp Gibson (born 1981), American Major League Baseball Umpire
- Tripp Isenhour (born 1968), American Golfer
- Tripp Merritt (born 1968), American College Football Coach
- Tripp Phillips (born 1977), American Tennis Player
- Adrian Piperi (born 1999), American Shot Putter
- Tripp Schwenk (born 1971), American Swimmer
- Tripp Self (born 1968), United States District Judge
- Tripp Sigman (1899–1971), American Major League Baseball player
- Tripp Tracy (born 1973), American Ice Hockey Goaltender
- Derrick Tribbett (born 1984), American Musician
- Tripp Welborne (born 1968), American National Football League Player
- Tripp York (Fred York), American Religious Studies Scholar
