= Afeez Agoro =

Nigerian record holder, country's tallest person (1975–2023)

- Born: 13 December 1975; Sabo, Yaba, Lagos, Nigeria
- Died: 14 June 2023 (aged 47); Lagos, Nigeria
- Education: University of Lagos
- Years active: 2003–2023
- Known for: Tallest person in Nigeria
- Height: 2.25 m (7 ft 4.58 in)

Afeez Agoro Oladimeji (13 December 1975 – 14 June 2023) was a Nigerian citizen who was previously recognised as the tallest man in Nigeria. At 2.25 metres (7 ft 5 in), he stood 6 inches shorter than his 2.41 metres (7 ft 11 in) compatriot, Abiodun Adegoke, who is likely the tallest man in Nigeria.

== Early life ==
Afeez Agoro was born in the city of Yaba, Lagos State on 13 December 1975 as the last child of three children for his mother who was the second wife of his late father. Agoro moved with his family to Akoka, Yaba where he grew up and also had his education, he attended St. Finbarr's College, Yaba. He obtained a National Diploma certificate from the University of Lagos a Higher National Diploma certificate from Lagos State Polytechnic.

Agoro had normal growth until he developed an ailment at the age of nineteen and when taken to a hospital, was diagnosed with acromegaly. Agoro unsuccessfully tried to combat the ailment and ultimately reached a height of 7'5", making him one of the tallest people in Africa.

== Career ==
In 2003, upon graduating from the Lagos State Polytechnic, Agoro went for his compulsory one-year National Youth Service Corps (NYSC) scheme in Kolokuma Local Government Area of Bayelsa State, Nigeria.

Agoro had the opportunity to feature in movies and in August 2018, I Am Agoro a Reality TV Show centred around his life and what it feels like living as the tallest man in Nigeria started airing exclusively on Linda Ikeji TV (LITV).

== Death ==
Agoro died in Lagos on 14 June 2023, at the age of 47.

== See also ==
- List of tallest people
