= Nickname =

Informal name of a person, place, or thing

A nickname, in some circumstances also known as a sobriquet, or informally a "moniker", is an informal substitute for the proper name of a person, place, or thing. It is distinct from a pseudonym, pen name, stage name, or title, although the concepts can overlap. A nickname may be a descriptive and based on characteristics, or it be a variant form of a proper name. Nicknames may be used for convenience by shortening a name, or they may be used to express affection, playfulness, contempt, or to reflect a particular character trait.

== Etymology ==
The compound word ekename, meaning "additional name", was attested as early as 1303. This word was derived from the Old English word eac, meaning "also", related to eacian, meaning "to increase". By the 15th century, rebracketing of the phrase "an ekename" led to its rephrasing as "a nekename". Though the spelling has changed, the meaning of the word has remained relatively stable ever since.

== People ==
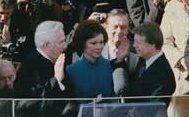
"I, Jimmy Carter...": James Earl Carter is sworn in as President of the United States using his nickname "Jimmy" in January 1977.

The term "nickname" is often used as an umbrella term to describe any deviation from a person's legal or official name; a nickname may be used exclusively, instead the person's original name, or it may be used in addition to it, with the person being referred to them interchangeably. Nicknames can be classified into several types, based on their origin or purpose. Nicknames may be based on names, physical characteristics, personality traits, geographical origins, or terms of endearment. Some types of nicknames, like diminutives, or shortened names, may be chosen by their bearers; for example, a woman named "Elizabeth" may choose to go by "Liz" because she finds it faster to write and say. Other types of nicknames tend to be bestowed on people by others. These might still be based on the bearer's legal name, or they might be unrelated. Some of these nicknames are affectionate in nature, like pet names or hypocorism, while others are derogatory and used as a form of name calling. Often, nicknames that are bestowed by other people are based on some type of distinctive characteristic, like "Lefty" for a left-handed person. Nicknames may also be ironic like "Skinny" for a corpulent person.

=== Language conventions ===
English nicknames are generally represented in quotes between the bearer's first and last names (e.g., Dwight David "Ike" Eisenhower and Daniel Lamont "Bubba" Franks). It is also common for the nickname to be identified after a comma following the full real name or later in the body of the text, such as in an obituary (e.g., Frankie Frisch, "The Fordham Flash"). Like English, German uses (German-style) quotation marks between the first and last names (e.g., Andreas Nikolaus „Niki“ Lauda). Other languages may use other conventions; for example, Italian writes the nickname after the full name followed by detto "called" (e.g., Salvatore Schillaci detto Totò), in Spanish the nickname is written in formal contexts at the end in quotes following alias (e.g. Alfonso Tostado, alias «el Abulense»), in Portuguese the nickname is written after the full name followed by vulgo or between parenthesis (e.g. Edson Arantes do Nascimento, vulgo Pelé / Edson Arantes do Nascimento (Pelé)) and Slovenian represents nicknames after a dash or hyphen (e.g., Franc Rozman – Stane). The latter may confuse because it resembles an English convention sometimes used for married and maiden names.

=== Societal uses ===
In Viking societies, many people had heiti, viðrnefni, or kenningarnöfn (Old Norse terms for nicknames) which were used in addition to, or instead of, the first name. In some circumstances, the giving of a nickname had a special status in Viking society in that it created a relationship between the name maker and the recipient of the nickname, to the extent that the creation of a nickname also often entailed a formal ceremony and an exchange of gifts known in Old Norse as nafnfestr ('fastening a name'). Nicknames are widely attested in Anglo-Saxon England, and similar social models have been applied to these names.

In Bengali society, for example, people will often have two names: a daknam (pet name) which is the name used by family and friends and a bhalonam which is their formal name.

In the United Kingdom, some surnames have nicknames traditionally attached. A man with the surname 'Clark' will be nicknamed 'Nobby'; the surname 'Miller' will have the nickname 'Dusty' (alluding to the flour dust of a miller at work); the surname 'Adams' has the nickname 'Nabby'. Several other nicknames are linked traditionally with surnames, including Chalky White, Bunny Warren, Tug Wilson, and Spud Baker. Other British nicknames allude to a person's origins. A Scotsman may be nicknamed 'Jock'; an Irishman 'Paddy' (alluding to Saint Patrick, the patron saint of Ireland) or 'Mick'; and a Welshman may be nicknamed 'Taffy' (from Welsh Dafydd, David). Some nicknames referred ironically to a person's physical characteristics, such as 'Lofty' for a short person, 'Curly' for a bald man, or 'Bluey' for a redhead.

Nicknames in Chinese culture are frequently used within a community among relatives, friends, and neighbors. One typical southern Chinese nickname often begins with a "阿" followed by another character, usually the last character of the person's given name. The Taiwanese politician Chen Shui-bian (陳水扁) is sometimes referred to as "阿扁" (A-Bian), for example.

Additionally, Southeastern Chinese communities and many Southeast Asian communities with cultural ties to China use nicknames to connote one's occupation or status. The landlord might be known simply as Towkay (simplified Chinese: 头家; traditional Chinese: 頭家; Pe̍h-ōe-jī: thâu-ke), Hokkien for "boss") to his tenants or workers, while a bread seller would be called "Mianbao Shu" 面包叔 (literally, Uncle Bread).

=== Nicknames derived from proper names ===
A nickname can be a shortened or a modified variation on a person's real name. These are sometimes called diminutives. People may decide to use these nicknames on their own, or may accept them after being called them by others. These nicknames take different forms:

- Contractions of longer names: Margaret to Greta.
- Initials: using the first letters of a person's first, middle and/or last name, e.g. "DJ" for Daniel James.
- Dropping letters: with many nicknames, one or more letters, often R, are dropped: Fanny from Frances, Harry from Henry, Meg from Margaret.
- Phonetic spelling: sometimes a nickname includes phonetic spelling: Len from Leonard.
- Letter swapping: during the Middle Ages, the letter R would often be swapped for either L or D: Hal from Harry; Molly from Mary; Sadie and Sally from Sarah. A final /k/ occurs in Frank from Francis, Chuck from Charles, and Rick from Richard. Other letter changes include Hob, Dob, Bob, and Nob from Rob; Dick and Hick from Rick; Bill from Will; Peg from Meg; and Polly from Molly.

A nickname may be formed by a portion of a name:

- Front of a name. Sometimes a nickname can come from the beginning of a given name: Al from Alan/Allan/Albert/Alfonse/Alfred/Alden/Alexander, Art from Arthur, Chris from Christopher/Christina, Ed from Edward, Edmond, Edgar or Edwin, Joe or Jo from Joseph, Josephine, or Joann, Niko from Nikola, or Miyu from Miyuki.
- End of name: Drew from Andrew; Xander from Alexander; Enzo or Renzo from Lorenzo; Beth from Elizabeth; Bel, Bell, Bella or Belle from Isabelle/Isabella, Liam from William, or Yumi from Mayumi.
- Middle of name: Liz from Elizabeth; Tori from Victoria; Del or Della from Adelaide.
- Addition of diminutives: before the 17th century, most nicknames in English had the diminutive ending -in or -kin, where the ending was attached to the first syllable: thus Walter → Wat → Watkin, Robert → Rob → Hob → Hobkin, Thomas → Tom → Tomkin. While most of these have died away, a few remain, such as Robert → Rob → Robin and Nicolas → Coll → Colin.
- Many nicknames drop the final one or two letters and add either ie/ee/y as a diminutive ending: Penny from Penelope, Edie from Edith, Eddie from Edward, Davy from David, Charlie from Charles, Mikey from Michael, Jimmy from James, and Marty from Martin.
- Initialization, which forms a nickname from a person's initials: A. E. Housman from Alfred Edward Housman, or Dubya for George W. Bush, a Texan pronunciation of the name of the letter 'W', President Bush's middle initial. Brazilian striker Ronaldo was given the nickname R9 (initial and shirt number).
- Nicknames are sometimes based on a person's last name ("Tommo" for Bill Thompson, "Campo" for David Campese) or a combination of first and last name such as "A-Rod" for Alex Rodriguez).
- Loose ties to a person's name with an attached suffix: Gazza for English footballer Paul Gascoigne (though used more widely in Australia for Gary) and similar "zza" forms (Hezza, Prezza, etc.) for other prominent personalities whose activities are frequently reported in the British press (see also Oxford "-er" for a similar but wider phenomenon).
- Use of the second name.
- Use of the generational suffix, like "Junior", or nicknames associated with a particular generational suffix, like Trey or Tripp for III.
- Combination of the first and middle name, or variations of a person's first and middle name. For example, a person may have the name Mary Elizabeth but has the nickname "Maz" or "Miz" by combining Mary and Liz.
- Doubling of part of a first name. For example, forming "NatNat" from Nathan/Natasha or "JamJam" from James.

=== Nicknames based on characteristics ===
Other nicknames are not based on proper names, but rather describe some characteristic about a person. These may be complimentary terms, like "Flash" for a fast runner, or they might be derogatory, like "Stinky" for someone with body odor. They may also be based on things like geographical origin, like "Tex" for someone from Texas. Ernesto Guevara was known as "Che" due to the propensity of Argentinian Spanish to use this particle, which made him stand out in Cuba.

=== Nicknames based on relationship ===
A nickname may refer to the relationship with the person. This is a term of endearment.

- In Japanese culture, Japanese honorifics are designed so that a term of endearment conveys the exact status of the relationship between two people. Recipients are allowed to restrict use to a certain person.
- In addition to using the title of "grandmother" or "grandfather," or the proper names of their grandparents, children may use terms like "MeMaw" or "PopPop," with the grandparents often claiming which nickname they want to be referred to early in a child's life.

== Geography ==
=== Placenames ===
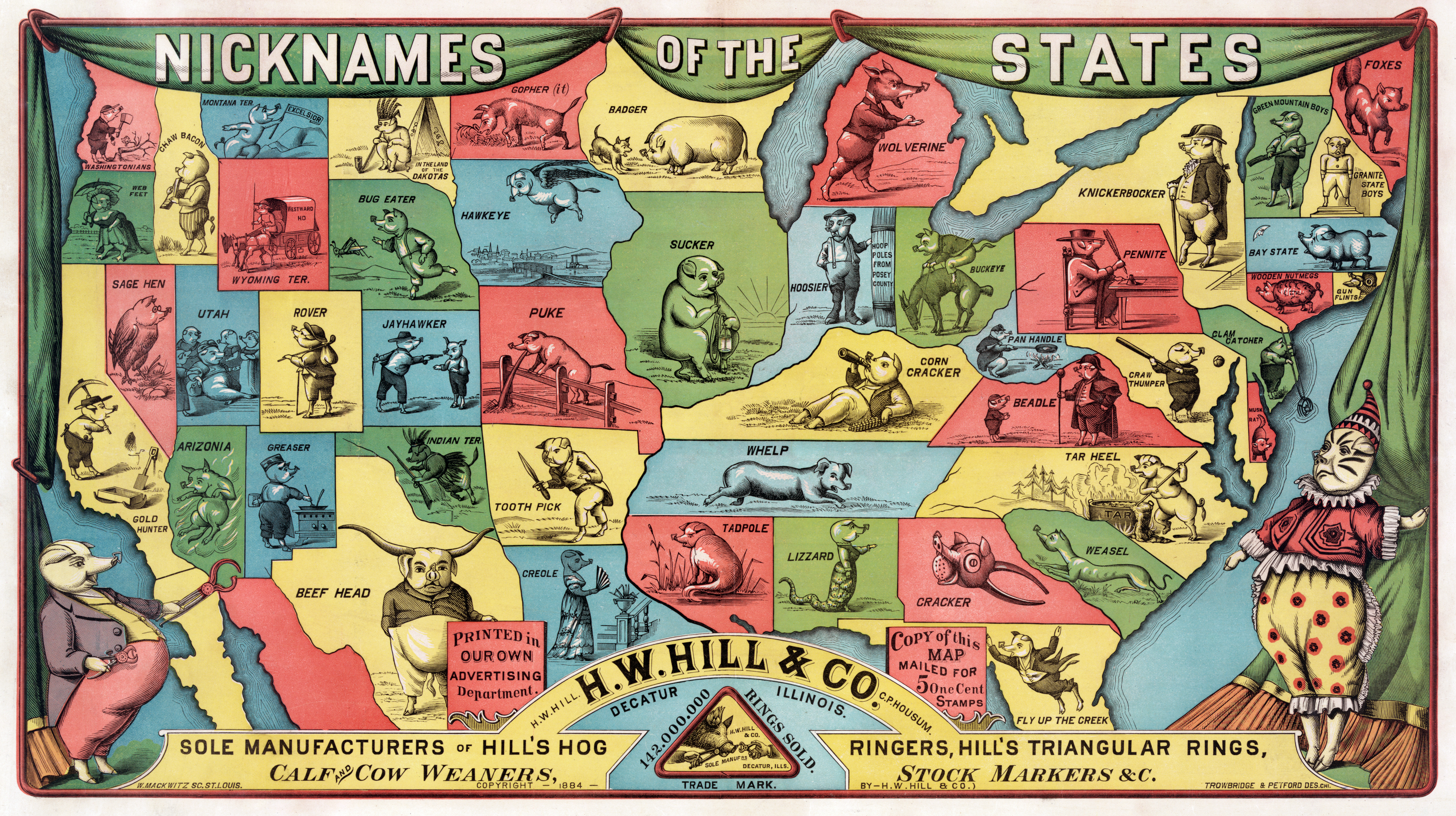
Nicknames of U.S. states, 1884

Many geographical places have titles, or alternative names, which have positive implications. Paris, for example, is the "City of Light", Rome is the "Eternal City", Venice is "La Serenissima", and New Jersey is the "Garden State". These alternative names are often used to boost the status of such places, contrary to the usual role of a nickname. Many places or communities, particularly in the US, adopt titles because they can help in establishing a civic identity, help outsiders recognize a community or attract people to a community, promote civic pride, and build community unity. Titles and slogans that successfully create a new community "ideology or myth" are also believed to have economic value. Their economic value is difficult to measure, but there are anecdotal reports of cities that have achieved substantial economic benefits by "branding" themselves by adopting new slogans.

By contrast, older city nicknames may be critical: London is still occasionally referred to as "The Smoke" in memory of its notorious "pea-souper" smogs (smoke-filled fogs) of the 19th and early 20th centuries, and Edinburgh was "Auld Reekie" for the same reason, as countless coal fires polluted its atmosphere.

=== Residents ===
Besides or replacing the demonym, some places have collective nicknames for their inhabitants. Many examples of this practice are found in Wallonia and in Belgium in general, where such a nickname is referred to in French as "blason populaire".

== Computing ==
In the context of information technology, nickname is a common synonym for the screen name or handle of a user. In computer networks it has become a common practice for every person to also have one or more nicknames for pseudonymity, to avoid ambiguity, or simply because the natural name or technical address would be too long to type or take too much space on the screen.

In the IRC (Internet Relay Chat) text-based messaging system first developed in the late 1980s, a nickname (or "nick") was required for every client that connected to an IRC server.

== See also ==
- Antonomasia
- Athletic nickname, for teams
- Australian national sports team nicknames
- Code name
- Epithet
- Honorific nicknames in popular music
- Legal name
- List of baseball nicknames
- List of basketball nicknames
- List of nicknames used in cricket
- List of monarchs by nickname
- List of nicknames of jazz musicians
- List of nicknames of United States presidents
- List of North American football nicknames
- List of sportspeople by nickname
- Lists of nicknames
- Metonymy
- Pet name
- Pseudonym
- Regimental nicknames of the Canadian Forces
- Sobriquet
- Stage name
- Synecdoche
- Terms of endearment
- Victory titles
- Call sign
- Military call sign
