= Yam Yaryan =

American baseball player (1892–1964)

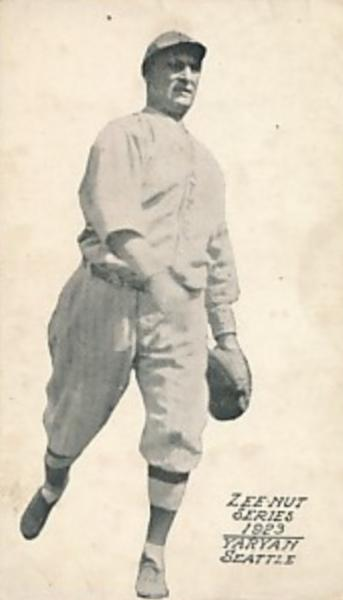
- Catcher
- Born: November 5, 1892; Knowlton, Iowa, U.S.
- Died: November 16, 1964 (aged 72); Birmingham, Alabama, U.S.
- Batted: Right Threw: Right

MLB debut
- April 23, 1921, for the Chicago White Sox

Last MLB appearance
- September 24, 1922, for the Chicago White Sox

MLB statistics
- Batting average: .260
- Home runs: 2
- Runs batted in: 24
- Stats at Baseball Reference

Teams
- Chicago White Sox (1921–1922)

Clarence Everett "Yam" Yaryan (November 5, 1892 – November 16, 1964) was an American professional baseball player. Yaryan played two seasons in Major League Baseball for the Chicago White Sox in 1921 and 1922, primarily as a catcher. He batted and threw right-handed.

Yaryan was born in Knowlton, Ringgold County, Iowa and died in Birmingham, Alabama.
