= Zaina Agoro =

Nigerian-American singer and songwriter

Zaina
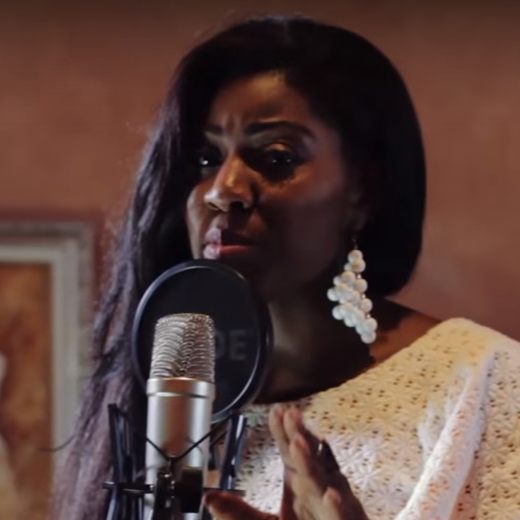

Background information
- Birth name: Zaina Agoro
- Born: Chicago, Illinois, US
- Genres: Pop, R&B
- Occupation(s): Singer, songwriter, lawyer
- Labels: Soul Muzik

Zaina Agoro (born in Chicago, Illinois, on June 7), better known by the mononym Zaina, is a Nigerian-American singer and songwriter.

== Early life ==
Zaina Agoro was born to Nigerian parents in Chicago, Illinois, where she spent her early years.

== Career ==
Agoro began a career in singing after securing a law degree. During this period, she returned to Nigeria to bring her experience home to her roots. She has gained recognition in the United States among the Nigerian community for her pop and R&B music, receiving two nominations from the NEA Awards in 2008 and 2011.

Zaina has worked with artists Eldee, Banky W, Styl-Plus, Lynxxx, Sauce Kid and Sasha. She has also shared the same stage with D'banj and 2face Idibia. She performed at the 2011 NEA Awards in New York.

Zaina was signed to Soul Muzik in July 2012 and has released two singles and one video.
