= Abiodun Adegoke =

Nigerian amateur basketball player

Personal information
- Born: c. 1999 (age 26–27)
- Listed height: 2.36 m (7 ft 9 in)

Career information
- College: Uncle N’guntu International College; Sports Academy in Wasinmi, Nigeria

Abiodun Adegoke (born c. 1999) is a Nigerian amateur basketball player who is notable for being one of the tallest amateur basketball players. Referred to as "Big Naija", a news report stated his age as 17 and 2.18 meters tall in the year 2016. At that time his feet were size 53 but the biggest shoes that he could find after much searching were size 50.

For a while, he attended the Segun Odegbami International College and Sports Academy in Wasinmi, Nigeria. Adegoke currently plays in the MPAC Elite Youth League in Dubai.

A video from Shaquille O'Neal garnered him NBA interest in March 2021, but he was not drafted.
