= List of sportspeople with nicknames =

This is a list of sportspeople with nicknames.

== Aviation sport ==
- "Mungo" = Mike Mangold, (United States)
- "The Quick Corsican" = Nicolas Ivanoff, (France)
- "Witt" = Steve Wittman, (United States)

== Biathlon ==
- "The Cannibal" = Ole Einar Bjørndalen (Norway)
- "The Flying Frenchman" = Raphaël Poirée (France)
- "The King of Biathlon" = Ole Einar Bjørndalen (Norway)
- "Lucky Luke" = Simon Eder (Austria)
- "Rotkäppchen" (German: "Little Red Riding Hood") = Kati Wilhelm (Germany)
- "Oksen fra Geilo" (Norwegian: "The Ox from Geilo") = Vetle Sjåstad Christiansen (Norway)
- "Super-Svendsen" = Emil Hegle Svendsen (Norway)
- "Turbo-Disl" = Uschi Disl (Germany)
- "Willi the Kid" = Wilfried Pallhuber (Italy)

== Boxing ==
- "The Greatest" = Muhammad Ali (United States)
- "The Atomic Bull" = Endre Weibye (Norway)
- "The Ballet Dancer" = Salamo Arouch (Greece) (Israel)
- "Baby Jake" = Jacob Matlala (South Africa)
- "Big Bad John" = John McDermott (England)
- "Big George" = George Foreman (United States)
- "The Boxing Doctor" = Harold Reitman (United States)
- "The Bronx Beauty" = Al Singer (United States)
- "The Bionic Hand" = Gerrie Coetzee (South Africa)
- "Chrysanthemum Joe" = Joe Choynski (United States)
- "Dangerous" = Dana Rosenblatt (United States)
- "Fraudley" = Audley Harrison (England) (intended to be an insult by Frank Warren)
- "Iron Mike" = Mike Tyson (United States)
- "The Ghetto Midget" = Isadore "Corporal Izzy" Schwartz (United States)
- "The Ghetto Wizard" = Benny Leonard (United States)
- "Ghost of the Ghetto" = Sid Terris (United States)
- "The Human Hairpin" = Harry Harris (United States)
- "The Knob Hill Terror" = Monte Attell (United States)
- "The Lion" = Lennox Lewis (England)
- "The Lion from Zion" = Roman Greenberg (Israel)
- "Little Fish" = Benny Bass (United States)
- "The Little Hebrew" = Abe Attell (United States)
- "Marvelous" = Marvin Hagler (United States)
- "The Newsboy" = Abraham Jacob Hollandersky (United States)
- "Old Chocolate" = George Godfrey (Canada)
- "La Petite Terreur" = Alphonse Halimi (France)
- "Ruby the Jewel of the Ghetto" = Ruby Goldstein (United States)
- "Slapsie" = Maxie Rosenbloom (United States)
- "Star of David" = Dmitry Salita
- "The Baddest Man on the Planet" = Mike Tyson (United States)
- "The Turk" = Carolina Duer (Argentina)
- "Wild Man" = Pavlo Ishchenko (Ukraine) (Israel)

== Bullfighting ==
- "José Falcón" = José Carlos Frita Falcao (Portugal)
- "El Niño del Sol Naciente" = Atsuhiro Shimoyama (Japan)

== Cycling ==
- "The Animal" = Ellen van Dijk, (Netherlands) road racing and track cycling rider
- "Afro-Bob" = Robert de Wilde, (Netherlands) BMX racing rider
- "Amtrak" = Charles Townsend, (United States) BMX racing rider
- "Big Chuck" = Charles Townsend, (United States) BMX racing rider
- "Black Magic" = Charles Townsend, (United States) BMX racing rider (which he had stenciled on the back of his racing pants in 1985)
- "Breakaway killer" = Ji Cheng, (China) road cyclist
- "Bubba" = Burlin Harris III, (United States) BMX racing rider
- "The Cannibal" = Eddy Merckx, (Belgium) road racing
- "Chasemainian Devil" = Charles Townsend, (United States) BMX racing rider
- "Choo-Choo Charlie" = Charles Townsend, (United States) BMX racing rider
- "Crazy Eric" = Eric Steele, (United Kingdom) freestyle BMX rider
- "Dirt" = Brian Foster, (United States) BMX racing rider
- "The Earthquake" = Eric Carter, (United States) BMX and downhill racing rider
- "Farmer John" = John Tomac, (United States) BMX, Cross-country and road racing rider
- "The Fleein' Korean" = Charles Townsend, (United States) BMX racing rider
- "The Flying Dutchman" = Robert de Wilde, (Netherlands) BMX racing rider
- "The Golden Child" = Eric Carter, (United States) BMX and downhill racing rider
- "The Green Hornet" = David Zabriskie, (United States) road racing rider
- "Jack" = John Prince, (United Kingdom) cyclist (and board track racing pioneer)
- "Jake the Snake" = Jacob Heilbron, (Canada) Cyclo-cross rider
- "Johnny T" = John Tomac, (United States) BMX, Cross-country and road racing rider
- "King of Skateparks" = Eddie Fiola, (United States) freestyle BMX rider
- "Leopard Head" = Sam Pilgrim, (United Kingdom) Freerider
- "Mellow Johnny" = Lance Armstrong, (United States) road racing rider (from Maillot Jaune, French for Yellow jersey)
- "No Way Rey" = Hans Rey, (Germany) bike trials rider
- "The Real McHoy" = Chris Hoy, (United Kingdom) (Scotland) track cycling
- "Scrawny" = Donald Robinson, (United States) BMX racing
- "Sheffield Steel" = Steve Peat, (United Kingdom) downhill racing rider
- "The Snake" = Mike King, (United States) BMX racing
- "Speeding Locomotive Charlie" = Charles Townsend, (United States) BMX racing
- "Steam Engine Charlie" = Charles Townsend, (United States) BMX racing
- "Stumpdog" = Randy Stumpfhauser, (United States) BMX racing
- "Stumpy" = Randy Stumpfhauser, (United States) BMX racing
- "T.I." = Takashi Ito, (Japan) freestyle BMX
- "Tomac Attack" = John Tomac, (United States) BMX racing, Cross-country and road racing
- "The Tome" = John Tomac, (United States) BMX, Cross-country and road racing rider
- "Torchy" = William Peden, (Canada) racing cyclist

== Darts ==
- "Wolfie" = Martin Adams (England)
- "The Flying Scotsman" = Gary Anderson (Scotland)
- "The Machine" = James Wade (England)
- "Barney" = Raymond van Barneveld (Netherlands)
- "The Crafty Cockney" = Eric Bristow (England)
- "The Viking" = Andy Fordham (England)
- "Mighty Mike" = Michael van Gerwen (Netherlands)
- "Jackpot" = Adrian Lewis (England)
- "Old Stone Face" = John Lowe (England)
- "Darth Maple" = John Part (Canada)
- "The Power" = Phil Taylor (England)
- "Snakebite" = Peter Wright (Scotland)

== Football ==
=== Association football ===
- "Ace" = Patrick Ntsoelengoe South Africa
- "L'Artiste" ("The Artist") = Michael Olise France
- "The Black Tulip" = Ruud Gullit Netherlands
- "El Pibe de Oro" ("The Golden Boy") = Diego Maradona Argentina
- "Hulk" = Givanildo Vieira De Souza Brazil
- "Kaká" =
  - Ricardo Izecson dos Santos Leite Brazil
  - Claudiano Bezerra da Silva Brazil
  - Ferreira Guimarães Brazil
  - Carlos Eduardo Ferreira Batista Portugal
- "La Pulga" (The Flea) = Lionel Messi Argentina
- "Pelé" = Edson Arantes do Nascimento Brazil
- "Mary Queen of Stops" = Mary Earps England
- "R9" / “O Fenômeno” (The Phenomenon)= Ronaldo Luís Nazário de Lima Brazil
- "Shoe" = John Moshoeu South Africa
- "Slow Poison" = Lesley Manyathela South Africa
- "El Tigre" = Radamel Falcao Colombia
- "Trigger" = Jason McAteer Republic of Ireland
- "The Wardrobe" = Papa Bouba Diop Senegal
- "White Knight" = Matthew Booth South Africa

=== Canadian football ===
All players are Canadian unless indicated otherwise.

- "Indian Jack" = Jack Jacobs, American quarterback and punter of Creek heritage
- "The Little Assassin" = Ron Lancaster, American quarterback, coach, and executive
- "The Little General" = Ron Lancaster, American quarterback, coach, and executive

== Golf ==
- "Big Three" =
  - Gary Player (South Africa)
  - Arnold Palmer (United States)
  - Jack Nicklaus (United States)
- "Big Phil" = Phil Mickelson (United States)
- "Magnificent Seven" =
  - Nancy Lopez (United States)
  - Pat Bradley (United States)
  - Amy Alcott (United States)
  - Patty Sheehan (United States)
  - Betsy King (United States)
  - Beth Daniel (United States)
  - Juli Inkster (United States)
- "Mrs. Doubtfire" = Colin Montgomerie (Scotland)
- "Prince Bashful" (ハニカミ王子, Hanikami Ōji) = Ryo Ishikawa (Japan)
- "The Small Unit" = Chez Reavie (United States)
- "The Goose" = Retief Goosen (South Africa)
- "The Black Knight" = Gary Player (South Africa)

== Motor sports ==
=== Formula One ===
- "The Rain Master" = Ayrton Senna (Brazil)
- "The Professor" = Alain Prost (France)
- "The Shunt" = James Hunt (United Kingdom)
- "The Rat" = Niki Lauda (Austria)
- "The Flying Finn" = Mika Häkkinen (Finland)
- "The Red Baron" = Michael Schumacher (Germany)
- "El Nano" = Fernando Alonso (Spain)
- "The Iceman" = Kimi Räikkönen (Finland)
- "The Mexican Minister of Defence" = Sergio Pérez (Mexico)
- "Honey Badger" = Daniel Ricciardo (Australia)
- "Smooth Operator" = Carlos Sainz Jr (Spain)
- "Sir Lewis" - Lewis Hamilton (United Kingdom)
- "Albono" - Alex Albon (Thailand)
- "Inspector Seb" - Sebastian Vettel (Germany)
- "The History Boy" - Kimi Antonelli (Italy)

== Horse racing ==
=== Jockeys/Trainers ===
- "Bo-rail" = Calvin Borel (United States) flat (from his penchant for steering his mounts close to the rail)
- "C-Team" = Felix Coetzee (South Africa) flat and Tony Cruz, trainer and former jockey (Hong Kong) (with Cheng Keung-fai, owner)
- "The Long Fellow" = Lester Piggott (United Kingdom) flat

== Hockey ==
=== Field hockey ===
- "La Maga" (The Magician) = Luciana Aymar (Argentina)
- "Saini Sisters" = four sisters from Punjab (India)
- "The Wizard" = Dhyan Chand (India)

== Martial arts ==
=== Judo ===
- "Rusty" = Rena Kanokogi (United States)

=== Karate ===
- "Master Ishii" = Kazuyoshi Ishii (Japan)

=== Mixed martial arts ===
- "The Bear" = Mark Smith (United States)

== Rugby ==
=== Union ===
- "Billy Whizz" = Jason Robinson, fullback and wing (England)
- "Robbo" = Jason Robinson, fullback and wing (England)
- "The Fun Bus" = Jason Leonard, Prop (England)
- "Shaggy" = Will Greenwood, Centre (England)
- "Pitbull" = Brian Moore, Hooker (England)
- "Pine Tree" = Colin Meads, Lock (New Zealand)
- "The Beaver" = Stephen Donald, Fly Half / Centre (New Zealand)
- "The Judge" = Paul Rendall, Prop (England)
- "Squeaky" = Rob Andrew, Fly Half (England)
- "Alfie" = Gareth Thomas, Centre/Wing (Wales)
- "The Iron Duke" = Bobby Windsor, Hooker (Wales)
- "Uncle Fester" = Keith Wood, Hooker (Republic of Ireland)
- "Judith" = Craig Chalmers, Fly Half (Scotland)
- "The Great White Shark" or "JJ" = John Jeffrey, Flanker (Scotland)
- "Malmesbury Missile" = Pieter-Steph du Toit, Lock/Flanker (South Africa)
- "Nobody" = John Eales, 2nd Row (Australia)
- "The Chiropractor" = Brian Lima, Centre (Samoa)
- "Ox" = Ox Nché, Prop (South Africa)
- "Os" (Afrikaans nickname, which means Ox) = Os du Randt, Prop (South Africa)
- "Kwagga" = Kwagga Smith, flanker (South Africa)
- "The Enforcer" = Bakkies Botha, lock (South Africa)
- "The Beast" = Tendai Mtawarira, Prop (South Africa)
- "l'Homme des Cavernes" (The Caveman) = Sébastien Chabal, number eight (France)
- "Pocket Rocket" = Brent Russell, Utility players (South Africa)
- "Pocket Dynamo" = Gio Aplon, Fullback / Wing (South Africa)
- "Slaptjips" (Afrikaans for potato chips or french fries) = Pieter Rossouw, Wing (South Africa)
- "The Viking" = RG Snyman, Lock (South Africa)
- "Spiere" (Afrikaans nickname for Muscles) = Piet du Toit (b 1935 – d. 1996), Prop (South Africa)

=== League ===
- "Chariots" = Martin Offiah, (United Kingdom) British international Wing

== Skateboarding ==
- "Bam" = Brandon Margera (United States)
- "Bucky" = Charles Lasek (United States)
- "Little Fairy" = Rayssa Leal (Brazil)
- "P-Rod" = Paul Rodriguez Jr. (United States)

== Snooker ==
- "The Rocket" = Ronnie O'Sullivan
- "Jester from Leicester" = Mark Selby
- "The Magician" = Shaun Murphy
- "The Pistol" = Mark Allen
- "The Hurricane" = Alex Higgins

== Track and field (athletics) ==
- "Emperor" = Haile Gebrselassie, long distances (Ethiopia)
- "The fastest man on no legs" = Oscar Pistorius, paralympic sprinter (South Africa)
- "Little Emperor" = Haile Gebrselassie, long distances (Ethiopia)
- "Oz" = Oscar Pistorius, paralympic sprinter (South Africa)
- "Lightning Bolt" = Usain Bolt, Olympic sprinter (Jamaica)
- "Pocket Rocket" = Shelly-Ann Fraser-Pryce, Olympic sprinter (Jamaica)
- "Stella the Fella" = Stella Walsh, sprinter (Poland)
- "Wonder Boy" = So Wa Wai, paralympic sprinter (Hong Kong)
- "Baby Faced Destroyer" = Tirunesh Dibaba, Olympic long-distance runner (Ethiopia)
- "King Ches" = Edward Cheserek, middle- and long-distance runner (Kenya)
- "Malmo" = George Malley, steeplechase runner (United States)
- "Chairman of the Boards" = Eamonn Coghlan, middle- and long-distance runner (Republic of Ireland)
- "Yifter the Shifter" = Miruts Yifter, long-distance runner (Ethiopia)
- "Flying Finn" = Hannes Kolehmainen and multiple other long-distance runners, see Flying Finn#Running (Finland)
- "Baby Jet" = Alice Annum, middle- and long-distance runner (Ghana)

== Triathlon ==
- "The Chrissinator" = Chrissie Wellington (United Kingdom)
- "Muppet" = Chrissie Wellington (United Kingdom)
- "The Grip" = Mark Allen (United States)
- "The Man" = Dave Scott (United States)

== Volleyball ==
- "Iron Hammer" = "Jenny" Lang Ping (China) indoor
- "Six Feet of Sunshine" = Kerri Walsh (United States) beach

== Watersport ==
=== Diving ===
- "The Princess of Diving" = Guo Jingjing, (China)

=== Sailing ===
- "Bertie" = Stanley Reed, (South Africa)
- "Tahiti Bill" = Bill Howell, (Australia)

=== Surfing ===
- "The Black Night" = Mickey Dora, (United States)
- "Da Cat" = Mickey Dora, (United States)
- "Eppo" = Michael Eppelstun, (Australia)
- "The father of surfing" = Duke Kahanamoku, (Hawaii)
- "Mickey" = Miklos Dora, (United States)
- "Midget"" = Bernard Farrelly, (Australia)
- "Miki" = Mickey Dora, (United States)
- "Mr. Malibu" = Mickey Dora, (United States)
- "Mr. Pipeline" =
  - Butch Van Artsdalen, (United States)
  - Gerry Lopez, (United States)
- "The Wounded Seagull" = Mark Richards, (Australia)

=== Swimming ===
- "The Albatross" = Michael Gross, (Germany)
- "The Baltimore Bullet" =Michael Phelps, (United States)
- "The Lochtenator" =Ryan Lochte, (United States)
- "Lucy" = Liu Zige, (China) (given by her coach Ken Wood as he cannot pronounce her name properly)

== Other ==
- "Checo" = Sergio Pérez, (Mexico) Formula One driver
- "Cliff" = Griff Sanders, (United Kingdom) lawn bowler (alternative name, used by friends)
- "DeG" = Patrick de Gayardon, (France) skydiver and wingsuit flying pioneer
- "Honey Badger" = Daniel Ricciardo, (Australia) former Formula One driver
- "Iceman" = Kimi Räikkönen, (Finland) former Formula One driver
- "Iron Lady" = Wendy Chai, (Malaysia) ten-pin bowler
- "Magic" = Joel Johnson, (United States) radio-controlled car racer
- "Master Masami" (正美先生, Masami sensei) = Masami Hirosaka, (Japan) radio-controlled car racer
- "Miss Ping" = Leah Neuberger, (United States) table tennis player
- "Mr. Monaco" = Graham Hill, (United Kingdom) former Formula One driver
- "Re-Pete" = Pete Fusco Jr., (United States) radio-controlled car racer
- "Schumi" = Michael Schumacher, (Germany) former Formula One driver
- "Super Dan" = Lin Dan, (China) badminton player
- "Tim" = Joseph Boggan, (United States) table tennis player
- "White Warrior(s)" = Fung Ying Ki, Yu Chui Yee, Fan Pui Shan, Kwong Wai Ip, Chan Kam Loi, Hui Charn Hung, Yan Yun Tai and Chan Wing Kin, Chan Yui Chong, Wong Kit Mui; (Hong Kong) wheelchair fencers
- "German Black Tri-Stars"(given by Koji Kato of NHK) =
  - Johannes Rydzek
  - Fabian Rießle
  - Eric Frenzel
- "The Flying Sikh"
  - Joginder Singh, (Kenya) , rally driver
  - Karamjit Singh, (Malaysia) , rally driver

== See also ==
- Nickname
- Lists of nicknames – nickname list articles on Wikipedia
