= Iowa Highway 2 =

State highway in Iowa, United States

Iowa Highway 2
- Iowa 2 highlighted in red

Route information
- Maintained by Iowa DOT
- Length: 251.376 mi (404.550 km)

Major junctions
- West end: N-2 at Nebraska City, NE
- I-29 near Percival; US 275 near Sidney; US 59 at Shenandoah; US 71 at Clarinda; US 169 at Mount Ayr; I-35 near Decatur City; US 69 at Leon; US 65 near Humeston; US 63 at Bloomfield; US 218 / Iowa 27 at Donnellson
- East end: US 61 at Fort Madison

Location
- Country: United States
- State: Iowa
- Counties: Fremont; Page; Taylor; Ringgold; Decatur; Wayne; Appanoose; Davis; Van Buren; Lee

Highway system
- Iowa Primary Highway System; Interstate; US; State; Secondary; Scenic
← Iowa 1	→ Iowa 3

Iowa Highway 2 (Iowa 2) is a 251-mile-long (404 km) state highway which runs across the southernmost tier of counties in the U.S. state of Iowa. At no point along its route is Iowa 2 more than 15 miles (24 km) from the Missouri state line, except for a small section near its eastern terminus. Iowa 2 stretches across the entire state; from the Missouri River near Nebraska City, Nebraska, to U.S. Highway 61 (US 61) at Fort Madison. Prior to becoming a primary highway, the route was known as the Waubonsie Trail.

== Route description ==
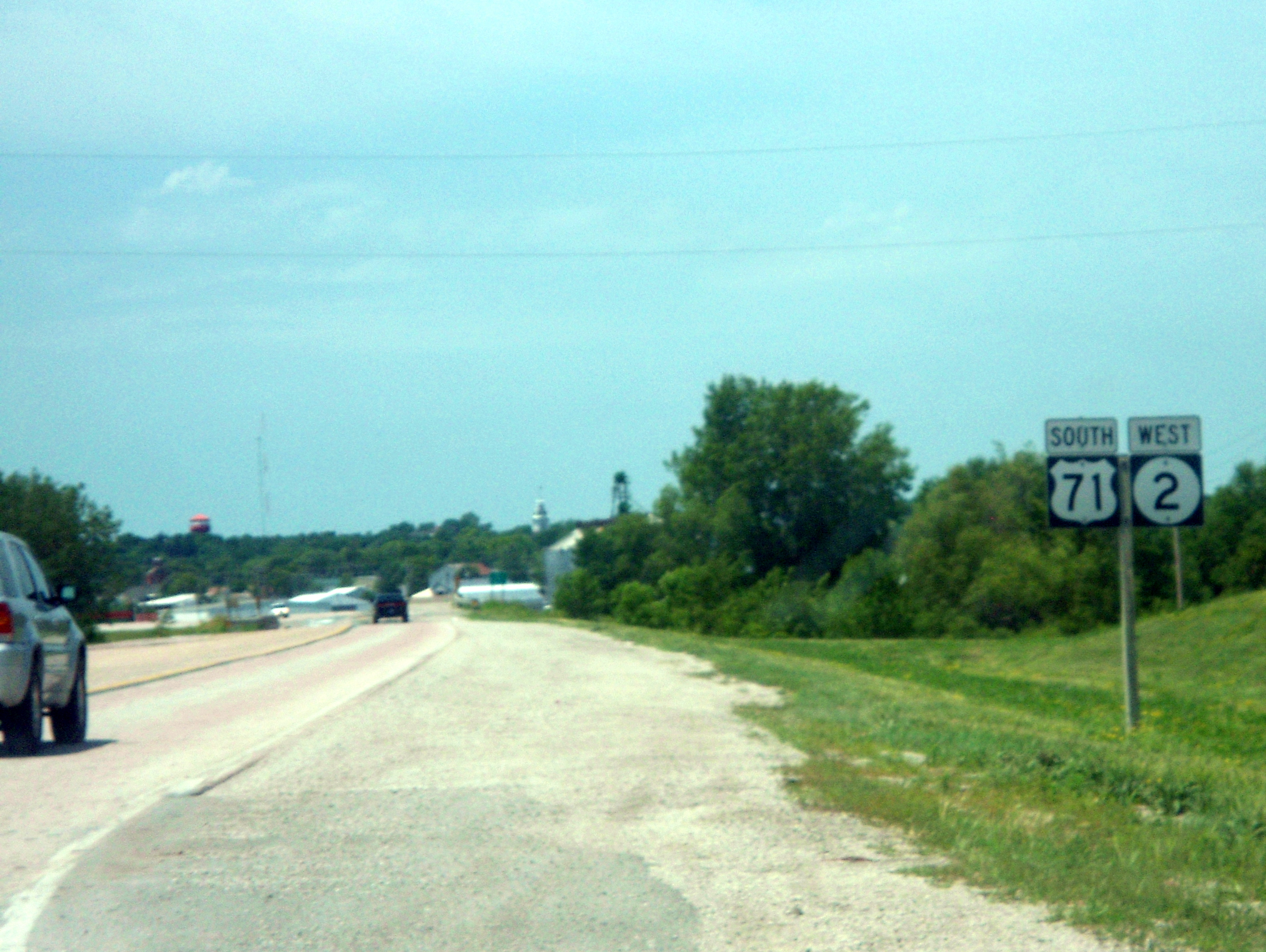
US 71 has a concurrency with Iowa 2 near Clarinda.

Iowa Highway 2 begins at the Nebraska City Bridge just east of Nebraska City, Nebraska. It goes northeast and then east as an expressway until meeting Interstate 29. It then continues east as a two-lane highway until meeting U.S. Highway 275 and turning north. It continues north, bypassing Sidney with U.S. 275, and turning east of Sidney. It goes east and meets U.S. 59 at Shenandoah and then U.S. 71 at Clarinda, which is served with Business Route 2. It continues east through New Market and meets Iowa Highway 148 at Bedford. After intersecting Iowa Highway 25 east of Bedford, it passes through Benton before beginning an overlap with U.S. Highway 169 through Mount Ayr. After passing through Kellerton, Iowa 2 intersects Interstate 35 at Decatur City.

Iowa Highway 2 continues east through Decatur City and meets U.S. Highway 69 in Leon. It continues east and intersects U.S. Highway 65 before entering Corydon, where it intersects Iowa Highway 14. After passing through Promise City, it goes through Centerville, where it intersects Iowa Highway 5. It later intersects Iowa Highway 202 near Moulton and then begins a concurrency with U.S. Highway 63 which ends in Bloomfield.

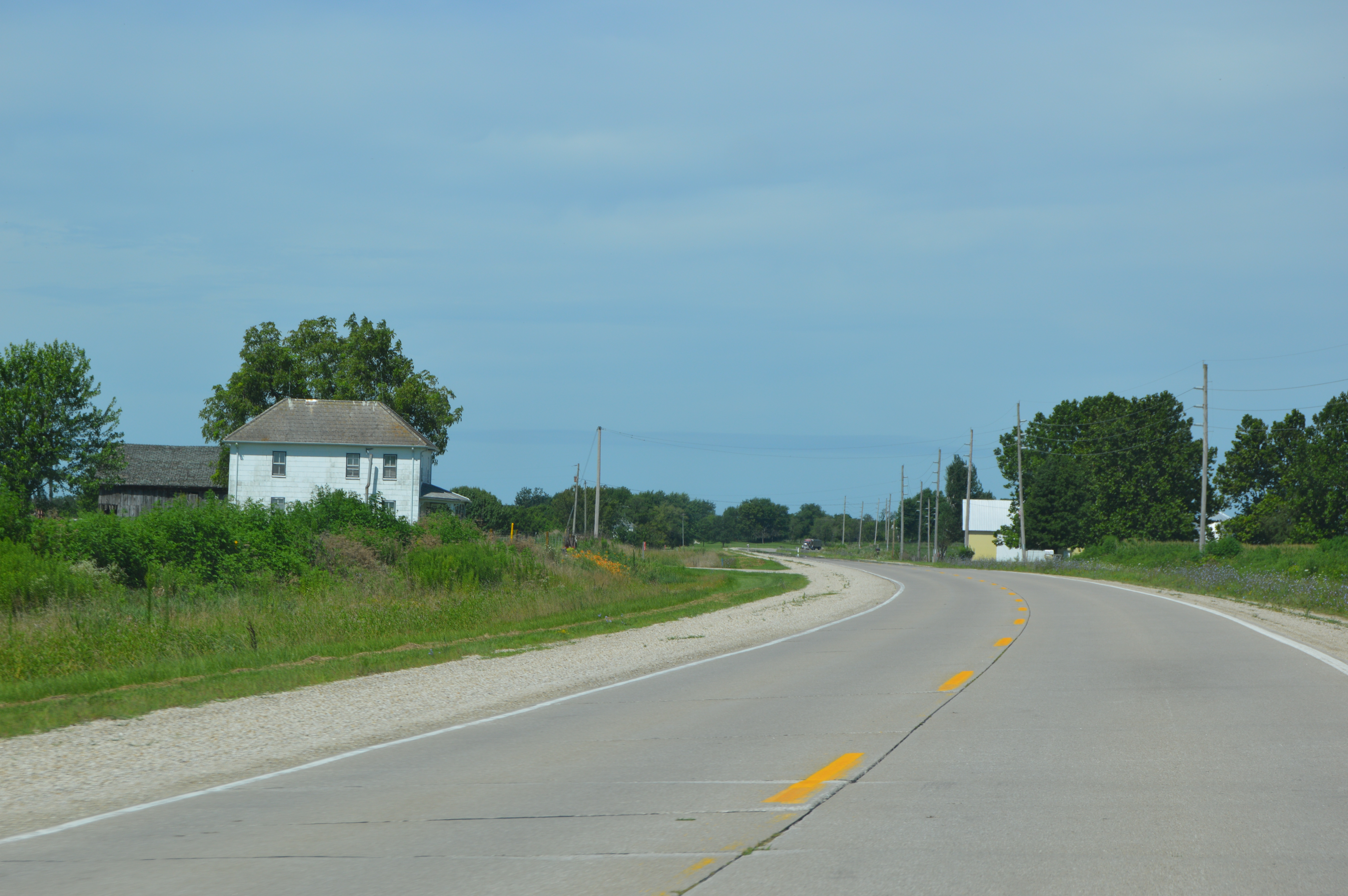
Iowa 2 in Lee County

After Bloomfield, Iowa Highway 2 turns southeasterly to pass through Pulaski, Milton, and Cantril, then turns briefly northeast. It turns east, intersects Iowa Highway 1 south of Keosauqua, then turns southeast towards Farmington. At Farmington, Iowa 2 meets Iowa Highway 81 and crosses the Des Moines River. It continues east and meets U.S. Highway 218 and Iowa Highway 27 at Donnellson. From there, it then meets U.S. Highway 61 and ends on the west side of Fort Madison.

=== Clarinda business loop ===
Iowa Highway 2 Business
- Location: Clarinda

Iowa Highway 2 Business begins at the western edge of Clarinda on an old alignment of Iowa 2. It follows State Street east into Clarinda. At 16th Street (Glenn Miller Avenue), IA 2 Bus. heads south until its junction with US 71 Business. Both routes follow Washington Street east towards US 71. Iowa 2 Business follows US 71 south to IA 2 to complete the business loop.

== History ==
The current Iowa Highway 2 was designated in 1920 as Primary Road No. 3 (PR No. 3). The 285-mile-long (459 km) route connected Nebraska City, Nebraska, to Burlington. PR No. 3 was overlaid upon the Waubonsie Trail from the Missouri River to Fort Madison. From Fort Madison, it overlapped the Mississippi Valley Scenic Highway, a precursor to the Great River Road. In 1941, the route had been renumbered Iowa 2 and the section between Fort Madison and Burlington was no longer part of the route.

The segment west of Interstate 29 was constructed as an expressway in 1986 with the plan of connecting Lincoln, Nebraska with Interstate 29 using a divided highway.

In late 2013, the Fort Madison city council accepted the jurisdiction of Iowa 2 within the city limits, which eliminated the last 5.8 miles (9.3 km) from the route.

== Major intersections ==
County	Location	mi	km	Destinations	Notes
Missouri River		0.000	0.000	N-2 west – Nebraska City, Lincoln	Continuation into Nebraska
Missouri River		0.000	0.000	Nebraska City Bridge	
Fremont	Benton Township	3.131	5.039	I-29 (Exit 10) – Council Bluffs, Kansas City, MO	
Fremont	Washington Township	8.591	13.826	CR L48 – Waubonsie State Park	Former Iowa 239
Fremont	Washington–Sidney township line	10.501	16.900	US 275 south / CR J46 – Hamburg, Riverton	Western end of US 275 overlap; former Iowa 42
Fremont	Sidney Township	15.222	24.497	US 275 north (Illinois Street) – Sidney, Tabor	Eastern end of US 275 overlap
Fremont–Page county line	Shenandoah	27.997	45.057	US 59 – Shenandoah, Tarkio, MO	
Page	Clarinda	45.013	72.441	Iowa 2 Business east (State Street)	
Page	Clarinda	46.809	75.332	US 71 south (Glenn Miller Avenue) / US 71 Bus. – Maryville, MO	Western end of US 71 overlap
Page	Nodaway Township	48.543	78.122	US 71 north / Iowa 2 Business west – Villisca	Eastern end of US 71 overlap
Taylor	Bedford	65.650	105.653	Iowa 148 north – Corning	Western end of Iowa 148 overlap
Taylor	Bedford	65.873	106.012	Iowa 148 south (Madison Avenue)	Eastern end of Iowa 148 overlap
Taylor	Bedford Township	66.658	107.276	CR N44 – Sharpsburg	Former Iowa 49
Taylor–Ringgold county line	Gay–Benton township line	79.265	127.565	CR P14 – Blockton	Former Iowa 25
Taylor–Ringgold county line	Gay–Benton township line	81.759	131.578	Iowa 25 north – Clearfield	
Ringgold	Waubonsie Township	89.239	143.616	CR P33 – Diagonal	Former Iowa 66
Ringgold	Rice Township	92.315	148.567	US 169 south – Grant City, MO	Western end of US 169 overlap
Ringgold	Mount Ayr	94.753	152.490	US 169 north (Cleveland Street) – Winterset	Eastern end of US 169 overlap
Decatur	Grand River Township	109.123	175.616	CR R15 – Grand River	Former Iowa 294
Decatur	Decatur Township	115.118	185.264	I-35 – Des Moines, Kansas City, MO	exit 12
Decatur	Leon	119.578	192.442	US 69 south (Lorraine Street) – Lamoni	Western end of US 69 overlap
Decatur	Leon	120.263	193.545	US 69 north (Church Street) / Mormon Pioneer National Historic Trail – Osceola	Eastern end of US 69 overlap
Decatur	High Point Township	128.635	207.018	CR R69 – Garden Grove	Former Iowa 204
Wayne	Clay Township	133.626	215.050	US 65 – Humeston, Princeton, MO	
Wayne	Benton Township	140.221	225.664	Liberty Road	Former Iowa 2
Wayne	Benton Township	140.705	226.443	CR S26 – Allerton	Former Iowa 40
Wayne	Corydon	143.218	230.487	Iowa 14 north – Chariton	
Wayne	Corydon Township	147.907	238.033	Liberty Road	Former Iowa 2
Wayne	South Fork Township	153.421	246.907	CR S60 – Seymour	Former Iowa 55
Appanoose	Centerville	167.215	269.106	Iowa 5 (18th Street) – Cincinnati, Albia	
Appanoose	Washington Township	176.411	283.906	CR T61 – Unionville	Former Iowa 369
Appanoose	Washington Township	177.787	286.120	Iowa 202 south – Moulton	
Davis	West Grove Township	186.787	300.605	US 63 south – Lancaster, MO	Western end of US 63 overlap
Davis	Bloomfield	191.818	308.701	US 63 north (Washington Street) – Ottumwa	Eastern end of US 63 overlap
Van Buren	Milton	207.088	333.276	CR V56 – Memphis, MO	Former Iowa 15
Van Buren	Des Moines–Vernon township line	219.134	352.662	Iowa 1 north – Keosauqua	
Van Buren	Bonaparte Township	226.581– 226.807	364.647– 365.010	CR W40 – Bonaparte	Former Iowa 79
Van Buren	Farmington Township	231.208	372.093	Iowa 81 south – Kahoka, MO	
Lee	Donnellson	242.289	389.926	Main Street	Former US 218
Lee	Donnellson	242.728	390.633	US 218 / Iowa 27 – Keokuk, Mount Pleasant	
Lee	Fort Madison	251.322– 251.633	404.464– 404.964	US 61 / US 61 Bus. begins (Avenue O) / Mormon Pioneer National Historic Trail – Keokuk, Burlington	Road continues as US 61 Business
1.000 mi = 1.609 km; 1.000 km = 0.621 mi: Concurrency terminus
