= Mount Ayr, Iowa =

- City
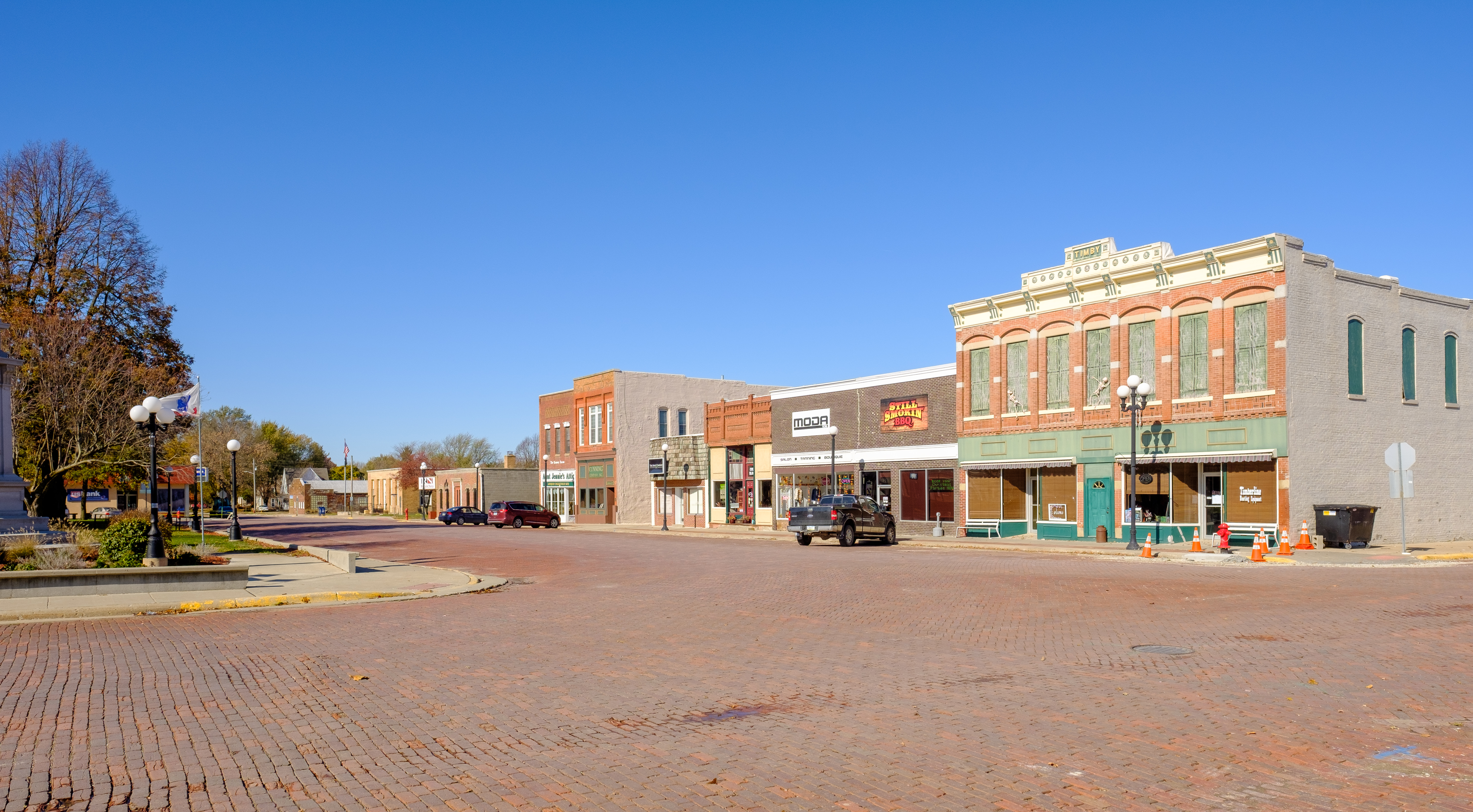
- Downtown

- Location of Mount Ayr, Iowa
- Coordinates: 40°42′48″N 94°14′45″W
- Country: United States
- State: Iowa
- County: Ringgold

Area
  - Total: 2.72 sq mi (7.05 km^{2})
  - Land: 2.70 sq mi (6.99 km^{2})
  - Water: 0.019 sq mi (0.05 km^{2})
- Elevation: 1,234 ft (376 m)

Population (2020)
  - Total: 1,623
  - Density: 601/sq mi (232.1/km^{2})
- Time zone: UTC-6 (Central (CST))
  - Summer (DST): UTC-5 (CDT)
- ZIP code: 50854
- Area code: 641
- FIPS code: 19-54480
- GNIS feature ID: 468415

Mount Ayr is a city in and the county seat of Ringgold County, Iowa, United States. The population was 1,623 at the time of the 2020 census. Mount Ayr is a rural community in southwestern Iowa, 22 miles west of Interstate 35 on State Highway 2. Mount Ayr was founded in 1875 and the community was named in honor of poet Robert Burns’ birthplace in Ayr, Scotland. The “mount” was added to indicate its location on the highest point of land in the area.

== Geography ==
Mount Ayr is at the intersection of US Route 169 and Iowa Highway 2. Kellerton is approximately nine miles to the east and Diagonal is about eight miles to the northwest.

According to the United States Census Bureau, the city has a total area of 2.69 square miles (6.97 km^{2}), of which 2.67 square miles (6.92 km^{2}) is land and 0.02 square miles (0.05 km^{2}) is water.

=== Climate ===
According to the Köppen Climate Classification system, Mount Ayr has a hot-summer humid continental climate, abbreviated "Dfa" on climate maps.

Climate data for Mount Ayr, Iowa, 1991–2020 normals, extremes 1893–present
Month	Jan	Feb	Mar	Apr	May	Jun	Jul	Aug	Sep	Oct	Nov	Dec	Year
Record high °F (°C)	67 (19)	80 (27)	90 (32)	92 (33)	103 (39)	105 (41)	112 (44)	111 (44)	105 (41)	93 (34)	82 (28)	70 (21)	112 (44)
Mean maximum °F (°C)	54.2 (12.3)	59.3 (15.2)	73.2 (22.9)	81.2 (27.3)	86.1 (30.1)	90.4 (32.4)	94.6 (34.8)	93.3 (34.1)	89.4 (31.9)	82.6 (28.1)	69.4 (20.8)	58.6 (14.8)	95.5 (35.3)
Mean daily maximum °F (°C)	31.9 (−0.1)	36.8 (2.7)	49.4 (9.7)	61.4 (16.3)	70.8 (21.6)	80.3 (26.8)	84.6 (29.2)	83.3 (28.5)	76.4 (24.7)	64.1 (17.8)	49.0 (9.4)	36.8 (2.7)	60.4 (15.8)
Daily mean °F (°C)	21.8 (−5.7)	26.5 (−3.1)	38.5 (3.6)	49.7 (9.8)	60.2 (15.7)	70.0 (21.1)	74.2 (23.4)	72.5 (22.5)	64.5 (18.1)	52.1 (11.2)	38.4 (3.6)	27.2 (−2.7)	49.6 (9.8)
Mean daily minimum °F (°C)	11.7 (−11.3)	16.1 (−8.8)	27.5 (−2.5)	38. (3)	49.7 (9.8)	59.6 (15.3)	63.9 (17.7)	61.8 (16.6)	52.7 (11.5)	40.2 (4.6)	27.9 (−2.3)	17.7 (−7.9)	38.9 (3.8)
Mean minimum °F (°C)	−10.1 (−23.4)	−3.4 (−19.7)	7.1 (−13.8)	21.8 (−5.7)	35.2 (1.8)	47.3 (8.5)	53.7 (12.1)	51.0 (10.6)	37.2 (2.9)	24.0 (−4.4)	10.7 (−11.8)	−3.4 (−19.7)	−14.2 (−25.7)
Record low °F (°C)	−30 (−34)	−29 (−34)	−20 (−29)	5 (−15)	22 (−6)	36 (2)	41 (5)	37 (3)	24 (−4)	0 (−18)	−15 (−26)	−28 (−33)	−30 (−34)
Average precipitation inches (mm)	0.73 (19)	1.25 (32)	2.16 (55)	3.37 (86)	5.35 (136)	5.39 (137)	4.40 (112)	3.98 (101)	3.71 (94)	2.88 (73)	2.11 (54)	1.63 (41)	36.96 (940)
Average snowfall inches (cm)	5.8 (15)	5.9 (15)	2.6 (6.6)	0.7 (1.8)	0.0 (0.0)	0.0 (0.0)	0.0 (0.0)	0.0 (0.0)	0.0 (0.0)	0.3 (0.76)	1.2 (3.0)	4.0 (10)	20.5 (52.16)
Average precipitation days (≥ 0.01 in)	4.0	4.6	6.2	8.5	11.0	9.2	8.2	7.9	6.5	7.1	5.0	4.7	82.9
Average snowy days (≥ 0.1 in)	2.9	3.4	1.1	0.3	0.0	0.0	0.0	0.0	0.0	0.1	0.7	2.5	11
Source 1: NOAA
Source 2: National Weather Service

== Demographics ==
Historical populations
Year	Pop.	±%
1870	422	—
1880	1,275	+202.1%
1890	1,265	−0.8%
1900	1,729	+36.7%
1910	1,646	−4.8%
1920	1,738	+5.6%
1930	1,704	−2.0%
1940	1,930	+13.3%
1950	1,793	−7.1%
1960	1,738	−3.1%
1970	1,762	+1.4%
1980	1,938	+10.0%
1990	1,796	−7.3%
2000	1,822	+1.4%
2010	1,691	−7.2%
2020	1,623	−4.0%
Source:"U.S. Census website". United States Census Bureau. and Iowa Data Center; Source: U.S. Decennial Census

=== 2020 census ===
As of the 2020 census, there were 1,623 people, 739 households, and 437 families residing in the city. The population density was 601.1 inhabitants per square mile (232.1/km^{2}). There were 811 housing units at an average density of 300.4 per square mile (116.0/km^{2}). Of the housing units, 8.9% were vacant; the homeowner vacancy rate was 1.7% and the rental vacancy rate was 10.6%.

Of the 739 households, 26.0% had children under the age of 18 living with them, 44.8% were married-couple households, 4.6% were cohabitating couples, 17.9% were households with a male householder and no spouse or partner present, and 32.7% were households with a female householder and no spouse or partner present. About 40.9% of households were non-families, 35.8% were made up of individuals, and 18.0% had someone living alone who was 65 years of age or older.

The median age in the city was 45.5 years. 21.9% of residents were under the age of 18 and 27.0% were 65 years of age or older. 24.2% of residents were under the age of 20; 4.3% were between the ages of 20 and 24; 21.2% were from 25 to 44; and 23.3% were from 45 to 64. The gender makeup of the city was 46.0% male and 54.0% female. For every 100 females there were 85.1 males, and for every 100 females age 18 and over there were 81.4 males.

0.0% of residents lived in urban areas, while 100.0% lived in rural areas.

Racial composition as of the 2020 census
Race	Number	Percent
White	1,548	95.4%
Black or African American	1	0.1%
American Indian and Alaska Native	3	0.2%
Asian	5	0.3%
Native Hawaiian and Other Pacific Islander	0	0.0%
Some other race	9	0.6%
Two or more races	57	3.5%
Hispanic or Latino (of any race)	32	2.0%

=== 2010 census ===
As of the census of 2010, there were 1,691 people, 746 households, and 437 families residing in the city. The population density was 633.3 inhabitants per square mile (244.5/km^{2}). There were 822 housing units at an average density of 307.9 per square mile (118.9/km^{2}). The racial makeup of the city was 98.1% White, 0.1% African American, 0.1% Native American, 0.7% Asian, 0.8% from other races, and 0.4% from two or more races. Hispanic or Latino of any race were 1.6% of the population.

There were 746 households, of which 24.1% had children under the age of 18 living with them, 47.9% were married couples living together, 7.4% had a female householder with no husband present, 3.4% had a male householder with no wife present, and 41.4% were non-families. 37.3% of all households were made up of individuals, and 24.8% had someone living alone who was 65 years of age or older. The average household size was 2.14 and the average family size was 2.80.

The median age in the city was 49.5 years. 19.9% of residents were under the age of 18; 6.3% were between the ages of 18 and 24; 17.5% were from 25 to 44; 26.6% were from 45 to 64; and 29.7% were 65 years of age or older. The gender makeup of the city was 44.5% male and 55.5% female.

=== 2000 census ===
As of the census of 2000, there were 1,822 people, 780 households, and 492 families residing in the city. The population density was 720.2 inhabitants per square mile (278.1/km^{2}). There were 856 housing units at an average density of 338.4 per square mile (130.7/km^{2}). The racial makeup of the city was 98.96% White, 0.27% Native American, 0.27% Asian, 0.05% from other races, and 0.44% from two or more races. Hispanic or Latino of any race were 0.44% of the population.

There were 780 households, out of which 26.4% had children under the age of 18 living with them, 53.6% were married couples living together, 6.9% had a female householder with no husband present, and 36.9% were non-families. 34.7% of all households were made up of individuals, and 23.5% had someone living alone who was 65 years of age or older. The average household size was 2.21 and the average family size was 2.82.

Age spread: 22.1% under the age of 18, 6.8% from 18 to 24, 20.6% from 25 to 44, 19.7% from 45 to 64, and 30.8% who were 65 years of age or older. The median age was 46 years. For every 100 females, there were 80.4 males. For every 100 females age 18 and over, there were 75.2 males.

The median income for a household in the city was $26,893, and the median income for a family was $37,188. Males had a median income of $27,333 versus $20,184 for females. The per capita income for the city was $14,444. About 8.3% of families and 13.1% of the population were below the poverty line, including 16.1% of those under age 18 and 14.5% of those age 65 or over.

== Arts and culture ==
=== Library ===
The Mount Ayr Public Library is a Carnegie Library and has a microfiche film collection dating back to 1838 and a specialized genealogy room.

== Parks and recreation ==
Local places for recreation include:

- Judge Lewis Recreational Park, the city park
- Poe Hollow Park & Ringgold Trailway
- Sun Valley Lake and Resort, including a golf course and boating facilities
- Fife's Grove and Loch Ayr, including a park and lake

== Education ==
Mount Ayr is the home of the Mount Ayr Community School District, which serves Mount Ayr, Beaconsfield, Benton, Delphos, Ellston, Kellerton, Maloy, Redding, Tingley, and portions of Clearfield.

Mount Ayr has one high school (grades 7-12) and one elementary school (grades K-6), as well as a preschool and alternative high school. Enrollment averages around 50 students in each class. The drama department of Mount Ayr Community High School (MACHS) has produced several students who have played at district and state competitions.

=== Education statistics ===
For population 25 years and over in Mount Ayr:

- High school or higher: 81.4%
- Bachelor's degree or higher: 16.6%
- Graduate or professional degree: 5.2%

== Airport ==
Judge Lewis Field, located two miles southeast of Mount Ayr 40°42′23″N 94°13′13″W and FAA Identified as 1Y3, is a small airport serving single-engine aircraft, operated by the city of Mount Ayr. The airport has a single gravel runway that is 2,600 feet (790 m) long by 40 feet (12 m) wide.

== Notable people ==
- Heidi Johanningmeier (born 1982) actress.
- Duane Miller (born 1947) professional football player and Drake football record-holder.

- Chad Elliott (born 1974) American Folk singer.

== Gallery ==
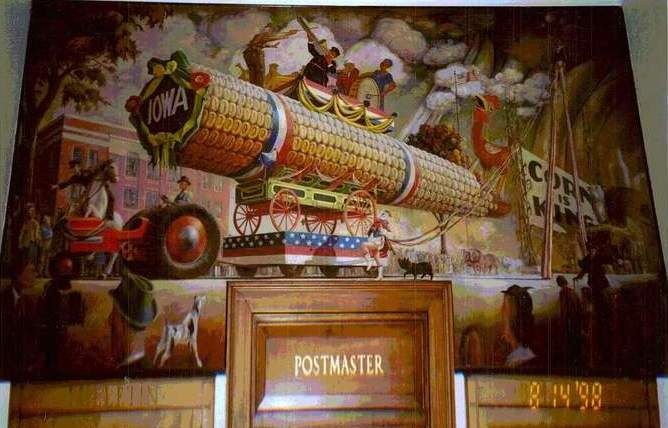
Orr C. Fischer, The Corn Parade, 1941, oil on canvas, mural on wall of post office.

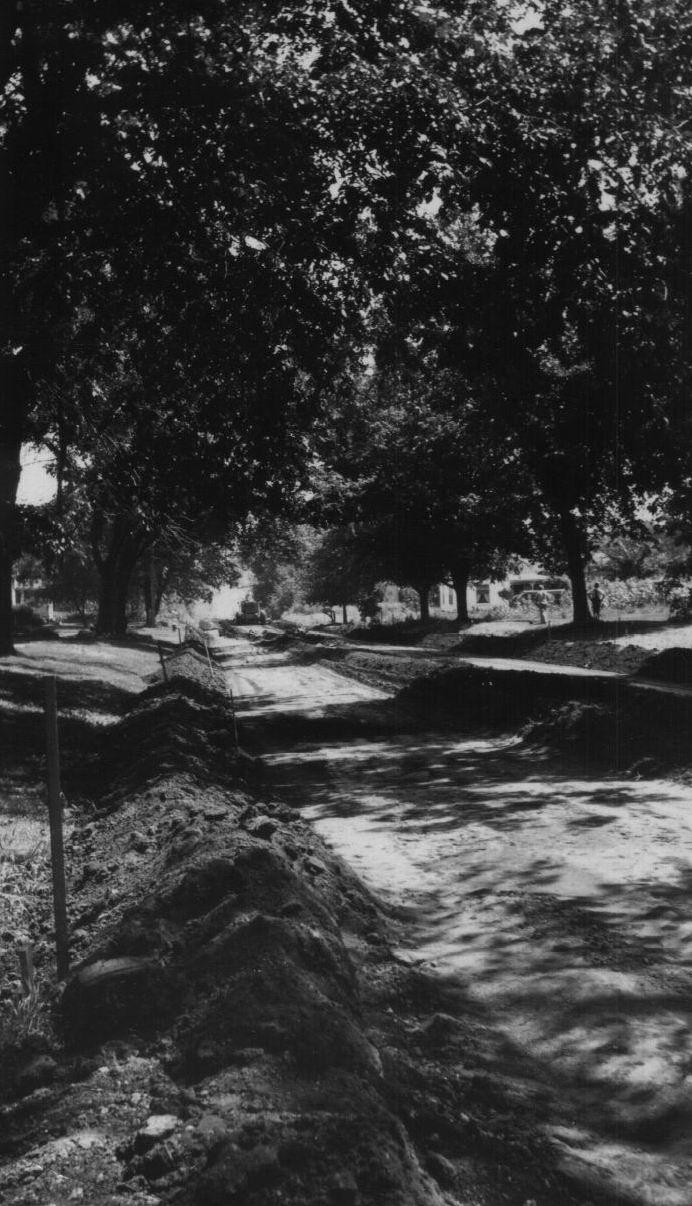
Paving Lincoln St.,
about 1935
