= Bloomington Township, Decatur County, Iowa =

Bloomington Township
- Township
- Location in Decatur County
- Coordinates: 40°41′11″N 93°57′47″W
- Country: United States
- State: Iowa
- County: Decatur

Area
  - Total: 35.68 sq mi (92.42 km^{2})
  - Land: 35.61 sq mi (92.22 km^{2})
  - Water: 0.073 sq mi (0.19 km^{2}) 0.21%
- Elevation: 1,076 ft (328 m)

Population (2000)
  - Total: 195
  - Density: 5.4/sq mi (2.1/km^{2})
- GNIS feature ID: 0467466

Bloomington Township is a township in Decatur County, Iowa, United States. At the 2000 census, its population was 195.

== History ==
Bloomington Township was named after Bloomington, Illinois, the former home of an early settler.

== Geography ==
Bloomington Township covers an area of 35.68 square miles (92.42 square kilometers); of this, 0.08 square miles (0.19 square kilometers) or 0.21 percent is water. The stream of Pot Hole Creek runs through this township.

=== Unincorporated towns ===
- Tuskeego

(This list is based on USGS data and may include former settlements.)

=== Adjacent townships ===
- Grand River Township (north)
- Decatur Township (northeast)
- Burrell Township (east)
- New Buda Township (southeast)
- Fayette Township (south)
- Riley Township, Ringgold County (southwest)
- Athens Township, Ringgold County (west)
- Monroe Township, Ringgold County (northwest)

=== Cemeteries ===
The township contains two cemeteries: Elk and Lillie.
