= Jefferson Township, Iowa =

Jefferson Township is the name of 23 townships in the U.S. state of Iowa:

- Jefferson Township, Adair County, Iowa
- Jefferson Township, Allamakee County, Iowa
- Jefferson Township, Bremer County, Iowa
- Jefferson Township, Buchanan County, Iowa
- Jefferson Township, Butler County, Iowa
- Jefferson Township, Clayton County, Iowa
- Jefferson Township, Dubuque County, Iowa
- Jefferson Township, Fayette County, Iowa
- Jefferson Township, Harrison County, Iowa
- Jefferson Township, Henry County, Iowa
- Jefferson Township, Johnson County, Iowa
- Jefferson Township, Lee County, Iowa
- Jefferson Township, Louisa County, Iowa
- Jefferson Township, Madison County, Iowa
- Jefferson Township, Mahaska County, Iowa
- Jefferson Township, Marshall County, Iowa
- Jefferson Township, Polk County, Iowa
- Jefferson Township, Poweshiek County, Iowa
- Jefferson Township, Ringgold County, Iowa
- Jefferson Township, Shelby County, Iowa
- Jefferson Township, Taylor County, Iowa
- Jefferson Township, Warren County, Iowa
- Jefferson Township, Wayne County, Iowa

== See also ==
- Jefferson Township (disambiguation)
