= Grand River Township, Decatur County, Iowa =

Grand River Township
- Township
- Location in Decatur County
- Coordinates: 40°46′08″N 93°57′59″W
- Country: United States
- State: Iowa
- County: Decatur

Area
  - Total: 35.76 sq mi (92.61 km^{2})
  - Land: 35.69 sq mi (92.43 km^{2})
  - Water: 0.069 sq mi (0.18 km^{2}) 0.19%
- Elevation: 1,037 ft (316 m)

Population (2000)
  - Total: 112
  - Density: 3.1/sq mi (1.2/km^{2})
- GNIS feature ID: 0467924

Grand River Township is a township in Decatur County, Iowa, United States. As of the 2000 census, its population was 112. The African American entrepreneur and publisher of the Iowa Bystander John Lay Thompson was born on his family's farm in the township in 1869.

== Geography ==
Grand River Township covers an area of 35.76 square miles (92.61 square kilometers); of this, 0.07 square miles (0.18 square kilometers) or 0.19 percent is water. The streams of South Elk Creek and West Elk Creek run through this township.

=== Adjacent townships ===
- Richland Township (north)
- Long Creek Township (northeast)
- Decatur Township (east)
- Burrell Township (southeast)
- Bloomington Township (south)
- Athens Township, Ringgold County (southwest)
- Monroe Township, Ringgold County (west)
- Union Township, Ringgold County (northwest)

=== Cemeteries ===
The township contains three cemeteries: Millsap, Oak Hill and Old Funk.
