= Richland Township, Decatur County, Iowa =

Richland Township
- Township
- Location in Decatur County
- Coordinates: 40°51′20″N 93°57′14″W
- Country: United States
- State: Iowa
- County: Decatur

Area
  - Total: 35.78 sq mi (92.67 km^{2})
  - Land: 35.74 sq mi (92.56 km^{2})
  - Water: 0.039 sq mi (0.1 km^{2}) 0.11%
- Elevation: 981 ft (299 m)

Population (2000)
  - Total: 394
  - Density: 11/sq mi (4.3/km^{2})
- GNIS feature ID: 0468601

Richland Township is a township in Decatur County, Iowa, United States. As of the 2000 census, its population was 394.

== Geography ==
Richland Township covers an area of 35.78 square miles (92.67 square kilometers); of this, 0.04 square miles (0.1 square kilometers) or 0.11 percent is water. The stream of Sand Creek runs through this township.

=== Cities and towns ===
- Grand River

=== Adjacent townships ===
- Doyle Township, Clarke County (north)
- Knox Township, Clarke County (northeast)
- Long Creek Township (east)
- Decatur Township (southeast)
- Grand River Township (south)
- Monroe Township, Ringgold County (southwest)
- Union Township, Ringgold County (west)
- Pleasant Township, Union County (northwest)

=== Cemeteries ===
The township contains six cemeteries: Grand River, O'Grady, Tennessee, Warrick, Westervelt and Young.
