= Fayette Township, Decatur County, Iowa =

Fayette Township
- Township
- Location in Decatur County
- Coordinates: 40°36′30″N 93°57′35″W
- Country: United States
- State: Iowa
- County: Decatur

Area
  - Total: 23.16 sq mi (59.99 km^{2})
  - Land: 22.96 sq mi (59.46 km^{2})
  - Water: 0.20 sq mi (0.53 km^{2}) 0.88%
- Elevation: 1,125 ft (343 m)

Population (2000)
  - Total: 185
  - Density: 8.0/sq mi (3.1/km^{2})
- GNIS feature ID: 0467826

Fayette Township is a township in Decatur County, Iowa, United States. As of the 2000 census, its population was 185.

== Geography ==
Fayette Township covers an area of 23.16 square miles (59.99 square kilometers); of this, 0.21 square miles (0.53 square kilometers) or 0.88 percent is water. The stream of Sevenmile Creek runs through this township.

=== Adjacent townships ===
- Bloomington Township (north)
- Burrell Township (northeast)
- Lamoni Township (northeast)
- New Buda Township (east)
- Riley Township, Ringgold County (west)
- Athens Township, Ringgold County (northwest)

=== Cemeteries ===
The township contains two cemeteries: Hollen and Sweet Home.

=== Major highways ===
- Interstate 35
- U.S. Route 69

=== Airports and landing strips ===
- Lamoni Municipal Airport
