= Sun Valley Lake, Iowa =

- Census-designated place
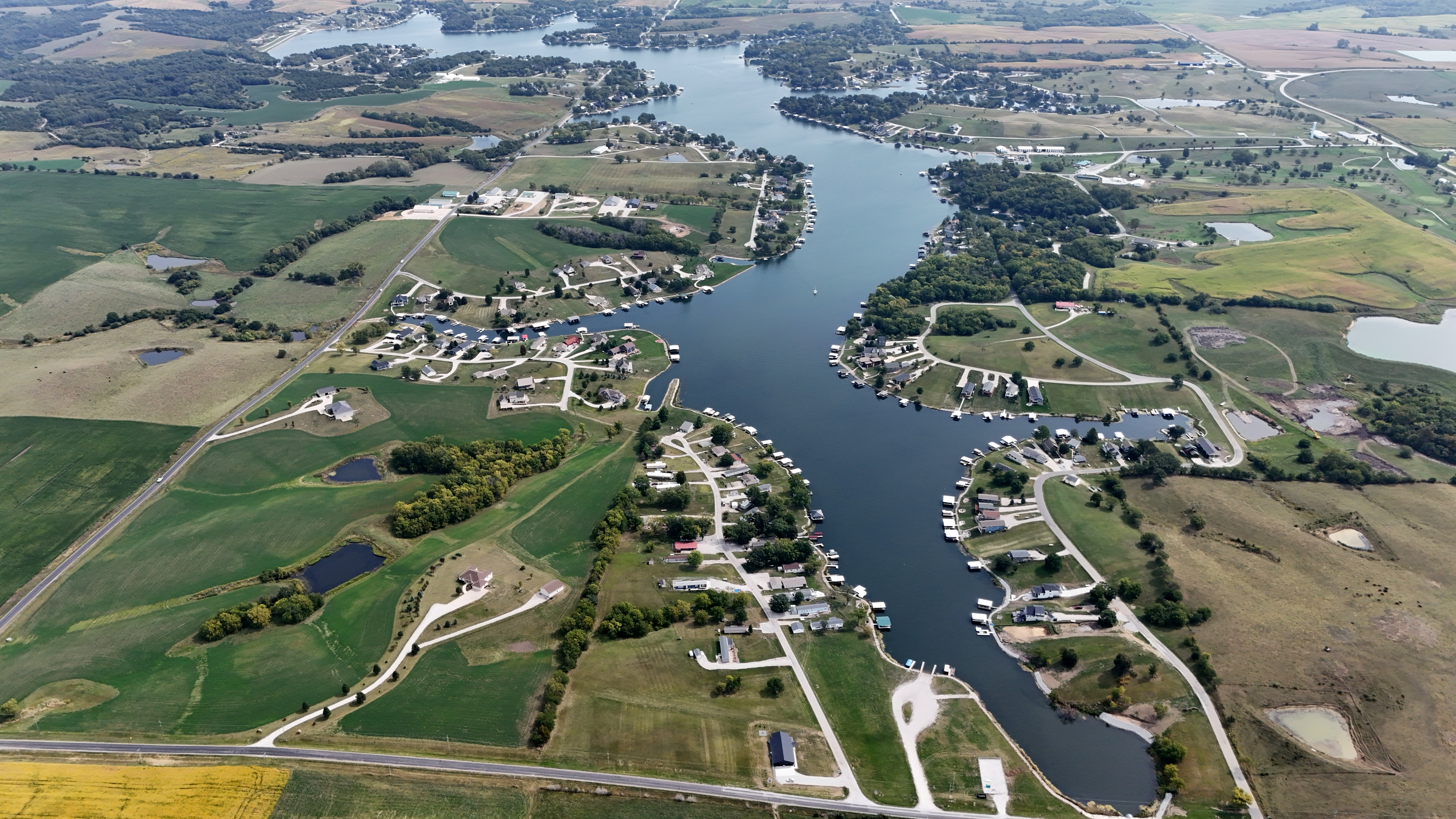
- Sun Valley Lake on September 12, 2024

- Location within Iowa
- Coordinates: 40°51′00″N 94°04′06″W
- Country: United States
- State: Iowa
- County: Ringgold

Area
  - Total: 2.71 sq mi (7.01 km^{2})
  - Land: 2.05 sq mi (5.31 km^{2})
  - Water: 0.66 sq mi (1.70 km^{2})
- Elevation: 1,139 ft (347 m)

Population (2020)
  - Total: 187
  - Density: 91.1/sq mi (35.19/km^{2})
- Time zone: UTC-6 (Central (CST))
  - Summer (DST): UTC-5 (CDT)
- ZIP code: 50074
- Area code: 641
- GNIS feature ID: 2585488

Sun Valley Lake is an unincorporated community and census-designated place (CDP) in Ringgold County, Iowa, United States. Its population was 187 as of the 2020 census. The community is located in northeastern Ringgold County on the shores of its namesake lake.

== Geography ==
According to the U.S. Census Bureau, the community has an area of 3.073 square miles (7.96 km^{2}), of which 2.419 square miles (6.27 km^{2}) is land and 0.654 square miles (1.69 km^{2}) is water.

== Demographics ==
Historical population
Census	Pop.	Note	%±
2010	161		—
2020	187		16.1%
U.S. Decennial Census

=== 2020 census ===
As of the census of 2020, there were 187 people, 98 households, and 71 families residing in the community. The population density was 91.1 inhabitants per square mile (35.2/km^{2}). There were 512 housing units at an average density of 249.6 per square mile (96.4/km^{2}). The racial makeup of the community was 96.3% White, 0.5% Black or African American, 0.0% Native American, 0.0% Asian, 0.0% Pacific Islander, 0.5% from other races and 2.7% from two or more races. Hispanic or Latino persons of any race comprised 0.5% of the population.

Of the 98 households, 12.2% of which had children under the age of 18 living with them, 69.4% were married couples living together, 4.1% were cohabitating couples, 16.3% had a female householder with no spouse or partner present and 10.2% had a male householder with no spouse or partner present. 27.6% of all households were non-families. 25.5% of all households were made up of individuals, 15.3% had someone living alone who was 65 years old or older.

The median age in the community was 66.1 years. 7.0% of the residents were under the age of 20; 3.2% were between the ages of 20 and 24; 12.3% were from 25 and 44; 27.3% were from 45 and 64; and 50.3% were 65 years of age or older. The gender makeup of the community was 51.9% male and 48.1% female.

== Education ==
It is in the Mount Ayr Community School District.
