= Duane Miller =

American football player (born 1947)

Duane Miller (born 1947) is a former college and professional football player. He holds nine Drake University football records, many which have withstood the test of time. Miller's career at Drake (1966–1970) included record-breaking performances on offense, defense, punt returns and kickoff returns. He was selected for the Drake Football All-Century Team.

Miller was chosen by the New York Giants in the 1970 NFL Draft. He played in all four preseason games and earned a spot on the 40-man regular season roster. In 1970, the NFL had a 40 man active roster with 7 additional players on an inactive roster. He suffered a knee injury at the start of the season that ended his football career.

== Early life ==
Duane Miller was born on December 12, 1947, the son of Delmar and Eleanor Miller. He grew up on a farm in Kellerton, Iowa and attended Mount Ayr, Iowa schools. While attending Mount Ayr High School, Miller participated in a number of sports, receiving a total of 15 letters in football, track and field, baseball and basketball.

In his senior year (1966), he was named to the Iowa All-State Football Team and set the Drake Relays High School Division record in long jump.

== College career ==
For Miller's first 3 football seasons at Drake (1966–1968), he played defensive back and ran back punts and kickoffs.

During his time at defensive back, he set the school record for interceptions and another record for interception return yardage—an average of 26 yards per interception return.

In his senior season (1969), Miller switched from defensive back to wide receiver. He still holds the season record for receiving yards in a season - 1,393. Miller holds Drake records for the most punt return yards in a season (481 yards in 1969), and the most kickoff return yardage in a season (679 yards in 1969).

Miller also holds the Drake record for the 2 longest punt returns, both in 1969: 91 yards against North Texas State and 86 yards against Western Illinois.

In 1969, Drake's home game against Northern Iowa was designated as 'Duane Miller Day' and included a ceremony at halftime. In December 1969, Drake met Arkansas State in the Pecan Bowl. Although Drake lost 29- 21, Miller played an outstanding game, with 9 receptions for a total of 192 yards. That same year, he was selected as a college division All-American.

== Professional career ==
Miller was selected in the sixth round with the 142nd overall pick in the New York Giants in the 1970 NFL draft. The team was coached by Alex Webster and quarterbacked by Fran Tarkenton. Miller played in all four preseason games and earned a spot on the regular season 53-man squad. As the season was about to begin Miller sustained a knee injury that ended his career.

== Post-football career ==
Duane Miller graduated from Drake University with a degree in Business Administration in 1970.

In 1972, he married his college sweetheart Donna (Hostetler) Miller. They have a son (Bret) and a daughter (Kyle). He also has three grandkids named Braylen, Olivia, and Dylan.

Miller owns an insurance agency in Des Moines, Iowa.
