= Lincoln Township, Ringgold County, Iowa =

Township in Iowa, USA

Coordinates: 40°51′N 94°25′W

Lincoln Township is a township in Ringgold County, Iowa, United States.
