= Liberty Township, Ringgold County, Iowa =

Township in Ringgold County, Iowa, United States

Coordinates: 40°46′N 94°11′W

Liberty Township is a township in Ringgold County, Iowa, United States.
