= Dragoon Trace =

The Dragoon Trace or Dragoon Trail is a historic trail that runs north and south through central Iowa and Missouri, including Ringgold County. It was originally made by the migration of animals, such as buffalo and deer. Because the Native Americans knew the animals had searched out the best place to cross the creeks and rivers, they too traveled this narrow path. Later used by the pioneers, this was the road to change Iowa's civilization.

In 1843, Fort Des Moines, the second post by that name, was built at the confluence of the Raccoon and Des Moines River for the protection of the Sauk and Meskwaki peoples from the enemy Sioux and white encroachment until cession of the Three-Year Tract. For the next two years, the natives lived harmoniously in three separate groups not far from the fort. After receiving their annuity payment in the fall of 1845, the Native Americans mournfully made ready to vacate their beloved Iowa.

Keokuk led the Sauk people single file out of Iowa on September 10, 1845, down the Dragoon Trace to Fort Leavenworth. The braves, women, and children were reported to be half wrapped in blankets, some riding ponies, some ponies only carrying bundles of belongings, others walking silently, single file with sadly bowed heads.

Wishecomaque (Hardfish) led a small band of Sauk that kept to themselves because they were the remnants of Black Hawk's tribe and bitter from having lost so many loved ones during the Black Hawk War. Eventually, they too followed Keokuk's footsteps down the Trace a few days later.

In one last effort to delay the move, Poweshiek asked that his Meskwakis too weak and poor to travel be allowed to remain in Iowa from the winter, but only about 100 of the sick were granted this request. Then Poweshiek, likewise, on October 8, 1845, reluctantly led the Meskwaki down the Dragoon Trace. When he reached the Missouri border around October 11, he met a white settler, perhaps Charles Schooler, whom he knew would not have been allowed to inhabit the Iowa Territory under the treaty agreement. Thinking he had reached the state of Missouri and had gone far enough, Poweshiek turned west to camp where the Grand River met the Missouri border. This was the territory of the Pottawattomies, friends of the Meskwaki, and they invited them to stay. Poweshiek established his village of about forty lodges on the Grand River, not far from the white settlement. Culturally different and fearful, the settlers reported the Native Americans to Fort Des Moines. Rather than sending soldiers which could have inflamed bloodshed, three civilians acquainted with Poweshiek went to talk to the old chief: Dr Campbell, J.B. Scott (hauler of supplies), and Hamilton Thrift (a tailor). Within the year, the Meskwaki were removed to the reservation in Kansas.

On March 10, 1846, Lieutenant Grier, with the balance of Company I and about 300 Native American stragglers, marched over Van's Hill below 'Coon River and down the Dragoon Trace, ending Fort Des Moines' use as a military post and ownership of these native tribes. Although Iowa became a state on December 28, 1846, it was another ten years before settlers of any great number came to Ringgold County.

The trail has been marked with Native picture writing so that the removal of these tribes out of Iowa is not forgotten.
