= Clinton Township, Ringgold County, Iowa =

Township in Iowa, USA

Coordinates: 40°36′N 94°25′W

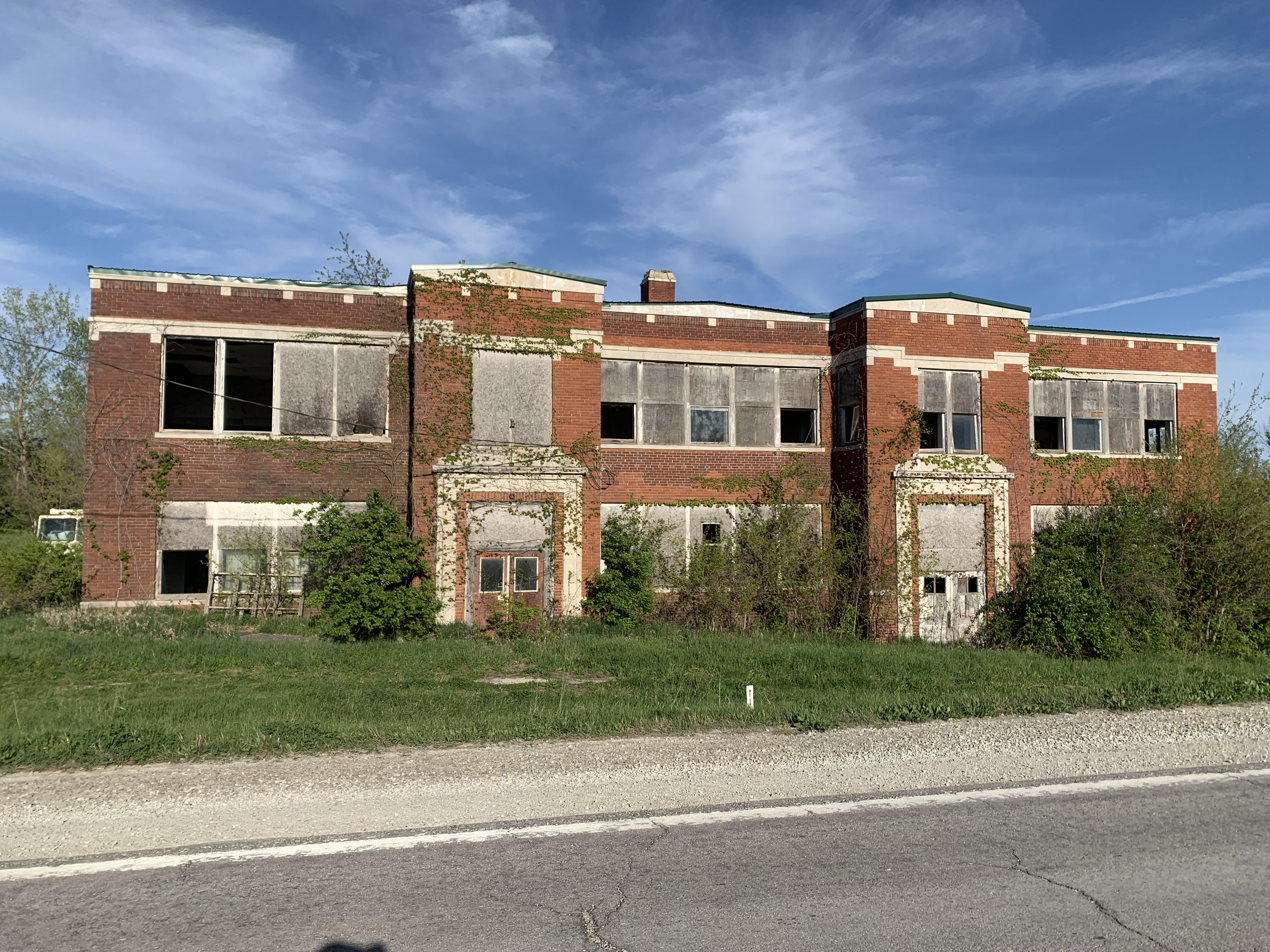
former Redding School in 2025

Clinton Township is a township in Ringgold County, Iowa, USA.
