= Tingley Township, Ringgold County, Iowa =

Township in Ringgold County, Iowa, U.S.

Coordinates: 40°51′N 94°11′W

Tingley Township is a township in Ringgold County, Iowa, USA.
