= Mount Ayr Community School District =

Public school district in Mount Ayr, Iowa, United States

Coordinates: 40.718024°N 94.226087°W

Location
- Mount Ayr, Iowa Ringgold, Decatur, and Taylor counties United States
- Coordinates: 40.718024, -94.226087

District information
- Type: Local school district
- Grades: K-12
- Superintendent: Jason Shaffer
- Schools: 2
- Budget: $12,122,000 (2020-21)
- NCES District ID: 1919860

Students and staff
- Students: 633 (2022-23)
- Teachers: 48.21 FTE
- Staff: 61.74 FTE
- Student–teacher ratio: 13.13
- Athletic conference: Pride of Iowa
- District mascot: Raiders
- Colors: Black, Red, and White

Other information
- Website: www.mtayrschools.org

Mount Ayr Community School District, or Mount Ayr Community Schools, is a rural public school district headquartered in Mount Ayr, Iowa. It has elementary and secondary (middle and high school) divisions.

The district is mostly in Ringgold County, while there are portions in Decatur and Taylor counties. Communities in its service area, in addition to Mount Ayr, include Beaconsfield, Benton, Ellston, Kellerton, Maloy, Redding, Tingley, and portions of Clearfield. It also includes the Delphos (formerly a municipality) and Sun Valley Lake census-designated places.

As of 2018, high school students from the Diagonal Community School District take their elective classes at Mount Ayr High School since the Diagonal district does not have the funds to operate elective classes.

The district mascot is the Raiders, and their colors are black, red and white.

== History ==
When the Clearfield Community School District closed in 2014, the Mount Ayr district absorbed a portion of it.

== Schools ==
The district operates two schools, both located in Mount Ayr:

- Mount Ayr Elementary School
- Mount Ayr High School

=== Mount Ayr High School ===
==== Athletics ====
The Raiders compete in the Pride of Iowa Conference in the following sports:

- Football
- Volleyball
- Cross Country
- Basketball
- Wrestling
- Bowling
- Golf
- Track and Field
  - Girls' 1988 Class 1A State Champions
  - Boys' 2014 Class 1A State Champions
- Baseball
- Softball

== See also ==
- List of school districts in Iowa
- List of high schools in Iowa
