= Ellston, Iowa =

- City
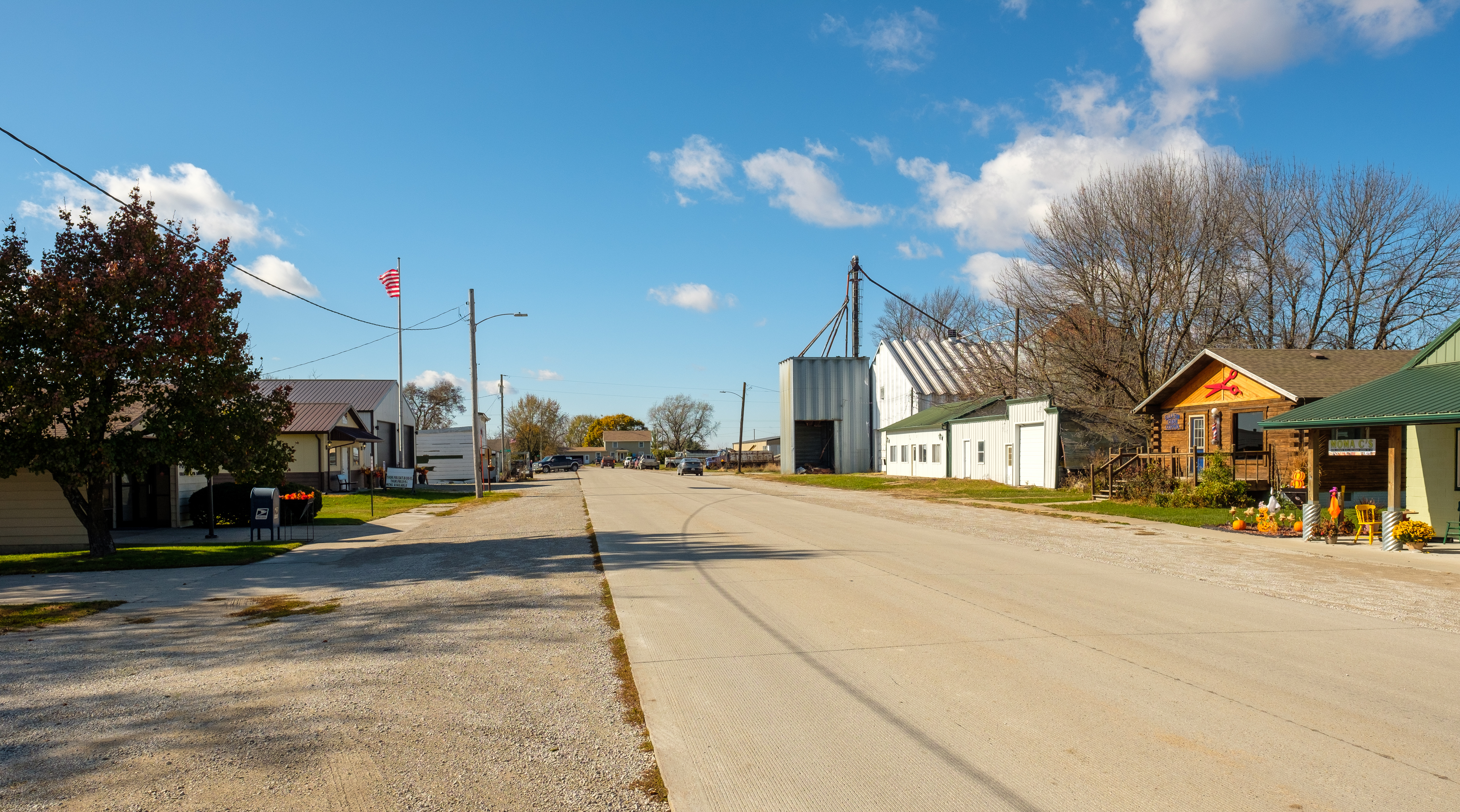
- Main Street

- Location of Ellston, Iowa
- Coordinates: 40°50′24″N 94°06′30″W
- Country: USA
- State: Iowa
- County: Ringgold

Area
  - Total: 0.25 sq mi (0.64 km^{2})
  - Land: 0.25 sq mi (0.64 km^{2})
  - Water: 0 sq mi (0.00 km^{2})
- Elevation: 1,230 ft (370 m)

Population (2020)
  - Total: 19
  - Density: 76.4/sq mi (29.51/km^{2})
- Time zone: UTC-6 (Central (CST))
  - Summer (DST): UTC-5 (CDT)
- ZIP code: 50074
- Area code: 641
- FIPS code: 19-25005
- GNIS feature ID: 2394666

Ellston is a city in Ringgold County, Iowa, United States. The population was 19 at the time of the 2020 census.

== History ==
In 1881, anticipating the railroad, Cochran & Le Fever built a general store, giving birth to the village of Wirt. The business failed and was sold six months later, but in March 1882 the Humeston & Shenandoah Railroad established a station here. In 1895 the town's name of Wirt was changed to Ellston so mail would be correctly received, rather than confused with the nearby northeasterly town of Van Wert.

The westerly border of Ellston is county road P-64. This road was originally part of the Dragoon Trace.

== Geography ==
According to the United States Census Bureau, the city has a total area of 0.2 square miles (0.52 km^{2}), all land.

== Demographics ==
Historical population
Census	Pop.	Note	%±
1900	242		—
1910	205		−15.3%
1920	212		3.4%
1930	212		0.0%
1940	195		−8.0%
1950	158		−19.0%
1960	115		−27.2%
1970	76		−33.9%
1980	60		−21.1%
1990	44		−26.7%
2000	57		29.5%
2010	43		−24.6%
2020	19		−55.8%
U.S. Decennial Census

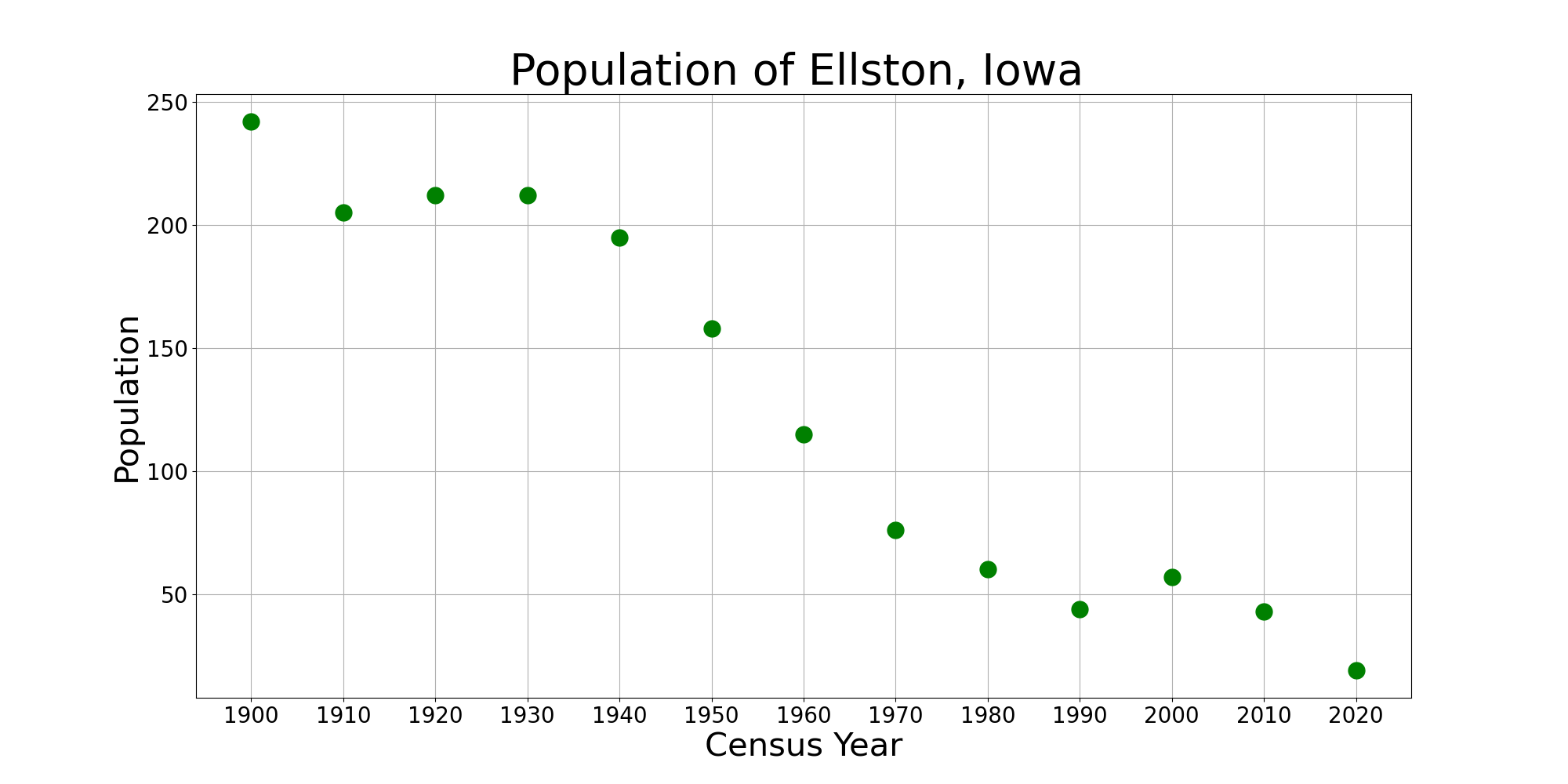
The population of Ellston, Iowa from US census data

=== 2020 census ===
As of the census of 2020, there were 19 people, 9 households, and 5 families residing in the city. The population density was 76.4 inhabitants per square mile (29.5/km^{2}). There were 13 housing units at an average density of 52.3 per square mile (20.2/km^{2}). The racial makeup of the city was 100.0% White, 0.0% Black or African American, 0.0% Native American, 0.0% Asian, 0.0% Pacific Islander, 0.0% from other races and 0.0% from two or more races. Hispanic or Latino persons of any race comprised 0.0% of the population.

Of the 9 households, 22.2% of which had children under the age of 18 living with them, 33.3% were married couples living together, 0.0% were cohabitating couples, 66.7% had a female householder with no spouse or partner present and 0.0% had a male householder with no spouse or partner present. 44.4% of all households were non-families. 44.4% of all households were made up of individuals, 22.2% had someone living alone who was 65 years old or older.

The median age in the city was 61.5 years. 5.3% of the residents were under the age of 20; 0.0% were between the ages of 20 and 24; 15.8% were from 25 and 44; 42.1% were from 45 and 64; and 36.8% were 65 years of age or older. The gender makeup of the city was 42.1% male and 57.9% female.

=== 2000 census ===
As of the census of 2000, there were 57 people, 23 households, and 16 families residing in the city. The population density was 255.5 inhabitants per square mile (98.6/km^{2}). There were 24 housing units at an average density of 107.6 per square mile (41.5/km^{2}). The racial makeup of the city was 100.00% White.

There were 23 households, out of which 39.1% had children under the age of 18 living with them, 47.8% were married couples living together, 17.4% had a female householder with no husband present, and 30.4% were non-families. 30.4% of all households were made up of individuals, and 17.4% had someone living alone who was 65 years of age or older. The average household size was 2.48 and the average family size was 3.13.

In the city, the population was spread out, with 24.6% under the age of 18, 12.3% from 18 to 24, 26.3% from 25 to 44, 29.8% from 45 to 64, and 7.0% who were 65 years of age or older. The median age was 39 years. For every 100 females, there were 111.1 males. For every 100 females age 18 and over, there were 115.0 males.

The median income for a household in the city was $35,625, and the median income for a family was $45,000. Males had a median income of $14,583 versus $23,571 for females. The per capita income for the city was $10,345. There were 10.0% of families and 17.5% of the population living below the poverty line, including 28.6% of under eighteens and none of those over 64.

== Education ==
Mount Ayr Community School District operates public schools serving the community.

== Notable person ==
- Harley A. Wilhelm, Manhattan Project chemist was born on a farm near Ellston.
