= Long Creek Township, Decatur County, Iowa =

Long Creek Township
- Township
- Location in Decatur County
- Coordinates: 40°51′25″N 93°50′18″W
- Country: United States
- State: Iowa
- County: Decatur

Area
  - Total: 35.70 sq mi (92.47 km^{2})
  - Land: 35.66 sq mi (92.36 km^{2})
  - Water: 0.042 sq mi (0.11 km^{2}) 0.12%
- Elevation: 1,040 ft (317 m)

Population (2000)
  - Total: 414
  - Density: 12/sq mi (4.5/km^{2})
- GNIS feature ID: 0468303

Long Creek Township is a township in Decatur County, Iowa, United States. As of the 2000 census, its population was 414.

== Geography ==
Long Creek Township covers an area of 35.7 square miles (92.47 square kilometers); of this, 0.04 square miles (0.11 square kilometers) or 0.12 percent is water. The streams of Bee Creek, Redmans Branch, Sand Creek, Short Creek and Wolf Creek run through this township.

=== Cities and towns ===
- Van Wert

=== Unincorporated towns ===
- Kingston

(This list is based on USGS data and may include former settlements.)

=== Adjacent townships ===
- Knox Township, Clarke County (north)
- Green Bay Township, Clarke County (northeast)
- Franklin Township (east)
- Center Township (southeast)
- Decatur Township (south)
- Grand River Township (southwest)
- Richland Township (west)
- Doyle Township, Clarke County (northwest)

=== Cemeteries ===
The township contains five cemeteries: Clinton, McKee, Munyon, Van Wert and West.

=== Major highways ===
- Interstate 35
