= Grant Township, Ringgold County, Iowa =

Township in Iowa, USA

Coordinates: 40°46′N 94°25′W

Grant Township is a township in Ringgold County, Iowa, USA.
