= Kellerton, Iowa =

- City
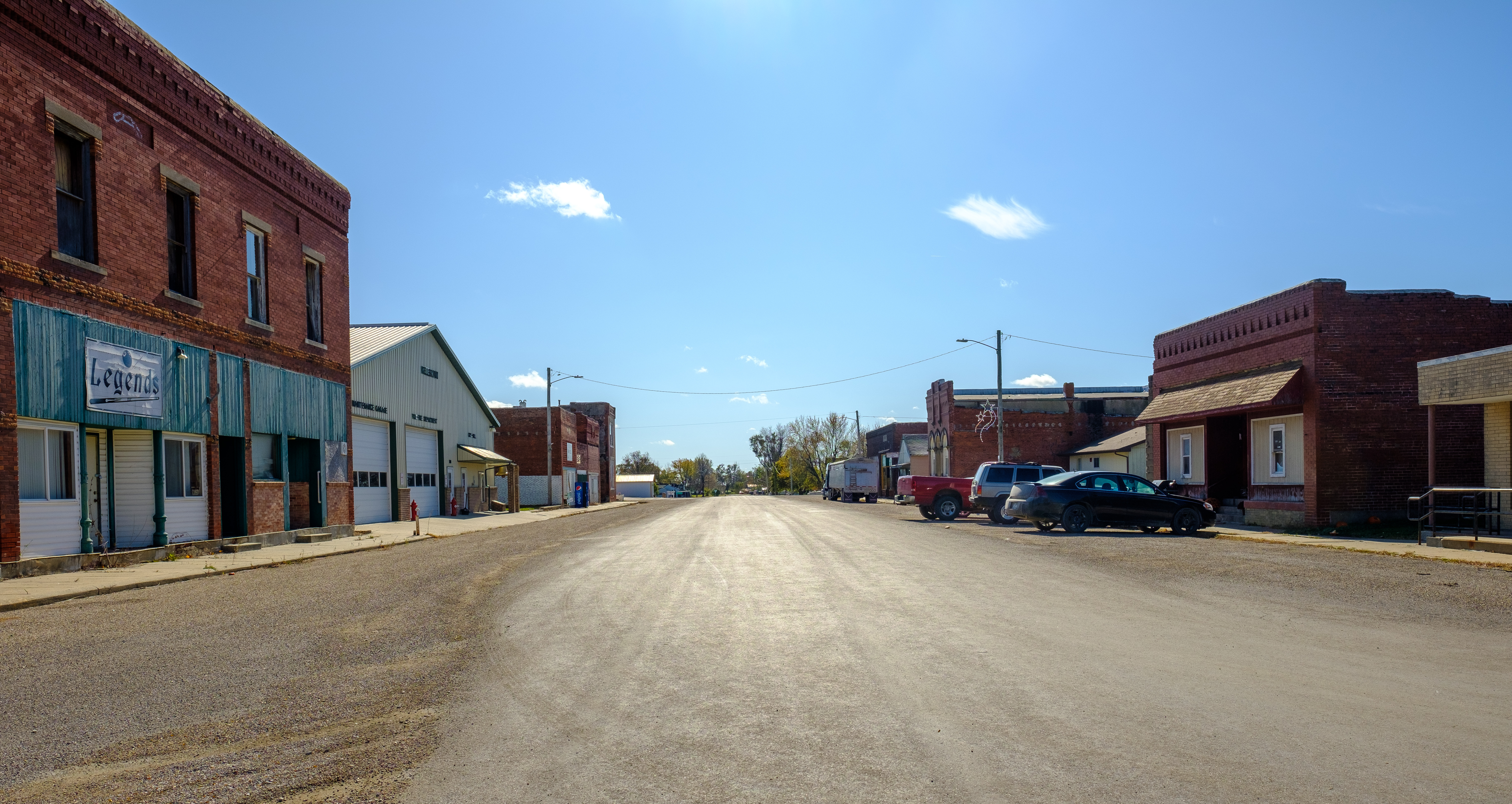
- South Decatur Street

- Location of Kellerton, Iowa
- Coordinates: 40°42′37″N 94°03′00″W
- Country: USA
- State: Iowa
- County: Ringgold

Area
  - Total: 0.65 sq mi (1.69 km^{2})
  - Land: 0.64 sq mi (1.67 km^{2})
  - Water: 0.0077 sq mi (0.02 km^{2})
- Elevation: 1,204 ft (367 m)

Population (2020)
  - Total: 243
  - Density: 376.4/sq mi (145.33/km^{2})
- Time zone: UTC-6 (Central (CST))
  - Summer (DST): UTC-5 (CDT)
- ZIP code: 50133
- Area code: 641
- FIPS code: 19-40350
- GNIS feature ID: 2395500

Kellerton is a city in eastern Ringgold County, Iowa, United States. The population was 243 at the time of the 2020 census.

== Geography ==
Kellerton is located on Iowa Highway 2 approximately nine miles east of Mount Ayr and two miles west of the Ringgold-Decatur county line.

According to the United States Census Bureau, the city has a total area of 0.67 square miles (1.74 km^{2}), of which 0.66 square miles (1.71 km^{2}) is land and 0.01 square miles (0.03 km^{2}) is water.

== Demographics ==
Historical populations
Year	Pop.	±%
1880	169	—
1890	277	+63.9%
1900	458	+65.3%
1910	503	+9.8%
1920	693	+37.8%
1930	540	−22.1%
1940	563	+4.3%
1950	483	−14.2%
1960	341	−29.4%
1970	299	−12.3%
1980	278	−7.0%
1990	314	+12.9%
2000	372	+18.5%
2010	315	−15.3%
2020	243	−22.9%
Source:"U.S. Census website". United States Census Bureau. and Iowa Data Center; Source: U.S. Decennial Census

=== 2020 census ===
As of the census of 2020, there were 243 people, 100 households, and 65 families residing in the city. The population density was 376.4 inhabitants per square mile (145.3/km^{2}). There were 134 housing units at an average density of 207.6 per square mile (80.1/km^{2}). The racial makeup of the city was 91.8% White, 0.4% Black or African American, 0.0% Native American, 0.4% Asian, 0.0% Pacific Islander, 0.8% from other races and 6.6% from two or more races. Hispanic or Latino persons of any race comprised 2.9% of the population.

Of the 100 households, 31.0% of which had children under the age of 18 living with them, 42.0% were married couples living together, 9.0% were cohabitating couples, 24.0% had a female householder with no spouse or partner present and 25.0% had a male householder with no spouse or partner present. 35.0% of all households were non-families. 26.0% of all households were made up of individuals, 7.0% had someone living alone who was 65 years old or older.

The median age in the city was 39.8 years. 28.0% of the residents were under the age of 20; 4.9% were between the ages of 20 and 24; 23.0% were from 25 and 44; 28.0% were from 45 and 64; and 16.0% were 65 years of age or older. The gender makeup of the city was 53.1% male and 46.9% female.

=== 2010 census ===
As of the census of 2010, there were 315 people, 126 households, and 88 families living in the city. The population density was 477.3 inhabitants per square mile (184.3/km^{2}). There were 161 housing units at an average density of 243.9 per square mile (94.2/km^{2}). The racial makeup of the city was 96.2% White, 1.0% Native American, 1.6% from other races, and 1.3% from two or more races. Hispanic or Latino of any race were 2.2% of the population.

There were 126 households, of which 34.9% had children under the age of 18 living with them, 48.4% were married couples living together, 15.1% had a female householder with no husband present, 6.3% had a male householder with no wife present, and 30.2% were non-families. 22.2% of all households were made up of individuals, and 11.9% had someone living alone who was 65 years of age or older. The average household size was 2.50 and the average family size was 2.91.

The median age in the city was 37.3 years. 27.3% of residents were under the age of 18; 7.1% were between the ages of 18 and 24; 25.7% were from 25 to 44; 22.9% were from 45 to 64; and 17.1% were 65 years of age or older. The gender makeup of the city was 52.7% male and 47.3% female.

=== 2000 census ===
As of the census of 2000, there were 372 people, 152 households, and 96 families living in the city. The population density was 559.2 inhabitants per square mile (215.9/km^{2}). There were 169 housing units at an average density of 254.1 per square mile (98.1/km^{2}). The racial makeup of the city was 98.92% White, 0.54% Native American, and 0.54% from two or more races.

There were 152 households, out of which 33.6% had children under the age of 18 living with them, 48.0% were married couples living together, 10.5% had a female householder with no husband present, and 36.2% were non-families. 30.9% of all households were made up of individuals, and 20.4% had someone living alone who was 65 years of age or older. The average household size was 2.45 and the average family size was 3.07.

In the city, the population was spread out, with 30.6% under the age of 18, 8.3% from 18 to 24, 24.7% from 25 to 44, 19.1% from 45 to 64, and 17.2% who were 65 years of age or older. The median age was 36 years. For every 100 females, there were 88.8 males. For every 100 females age 18 and over, there were 87.0 males.

The median income for a household in the city was $29,000, and the median income for a family was $33,173. Males had a median income of $19,844 versus $18,929 for females. The per capita income for the city was $11,442. About 14.9% of families and 20.6% of the population were below the poverty line, including 27.0% of those under age 18 and 29.3% of those age 65 or over.

== Education ==
Mount Ayr Community School District operates public schools serving the community.

== Notable person ==
- Duane Miller (born 1947), professional football player and Drake University football record-holder.
