= Tuskeego, Iowa =

- Unincorporated community
- Location within Iowa
- Coordinates: 40°40′00″N 93°59′03″W
- Country: United States
- State: Iowa
- County: Decatur
- Elevation: 1,171 ft (357 m)
- Time zone: UTC-6 (Central (CST))
  - Summer (DST): UTC-5 (CDT)
- Area code: 641
- GNIS feature ID: 1822791

Tuskeego is an unincorporated community in Bloomington Township, Decatur County, Iowa, United States. Tuskeego is located along County Highway J45, 4 miles (6.4 km) northwest of Lamoni.

== History ==
Tuskeego's population was 31 in 1902, and 32 in 1925. The population was 25 in 1940.
