= Washington Township, Ringgold County, Iowa =

Township in Ringgold County, Iowa, U.S.

Coordinates: 40°46′N 94°18′W

Washington Township is a township in Ringgold County, Iowa, USA.
