= Poe Township, Ringgold County, Iowa =

Coordinates: 40°40′49″N 94°10′44″W

Poe Township
- Township
- (Iowa) Flag
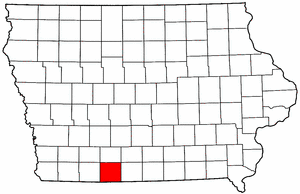
- Country: United States
- State: Iowa
- County: Ringgold County

Population (2010)
  - Total: 169
- GNIS: 468552

Poe Township is a township located in Ringgold County, Iowa. As of the 2010 census, it had a population of 169 inhabitants and a population density of 1.93 people per km^{2}.

== Demography ==
According to the 2010 census, there were 169 people residing in the township of Poe. Of the 169 inhabitants, the municipality of Poe was composed by 98.82% White, and 2.37% Hispanic or Latino.
