= John L. Thompson =

American journalist and businessman

John Lay Thompson (April 3, 1869, Grand River Township, Decatur County, Iowa – 1930) was an Iowa journalist and businessman who played a key role in the early history of the African American newspaper the Iowa Bystander.

Thompson was born to Andy and Catherine Thompson in 1869, while the family lived in Decatur County. He was the first of four children (John, Eldora, Eddie), and had one older half-brother (Benjamin Sheppard). Born into slavery in Kentucky, Andy Thompson was released by his enslaver in 1862 and settled in Decatur County, Iowa. The elder Thompson put all his children through college with his earnings as a farmer on 240 acres (0.97 km^{2}) in Decatur County.

Thompson graduated from Iowa Business College in 1896 and the Drake University Law School in 1898. While still a student at Drake, he took over the newly founded Iowa State Bystander from original publisher William Coalson in 1896. He stayed in Des Moines for the rest of his life, and over the following years, he turned the newspaper into a successful enterprise by organizing aggressive subscription drives and threatened boycotts against businesses that refused to advertise in a black newspaper. During the First World War, Thompson dedicated entire issues of the Bystander to issues surrounding the Buffalo Soldier regiments stationed in Iowa's Camp Dodge. After Armistice, Thompson met many returning black veterans, including James B. Morris. Morris took over the Bystander in 1922.

In addition to his work in journalism, Thompson and his wife, Maud Watkins-Thompson, were active in Iowan society. He served as deputy county treasurer in Polk County, Iowa (dates unknown), as well as deputy clerk of the Iowa Historical building. In July 1912, he was named the Grand Master of the Grand Lodge of Iowa, Prince Hall.
