= Sidney Township, Fremont County, Iowa =

Sidney Township
- Township
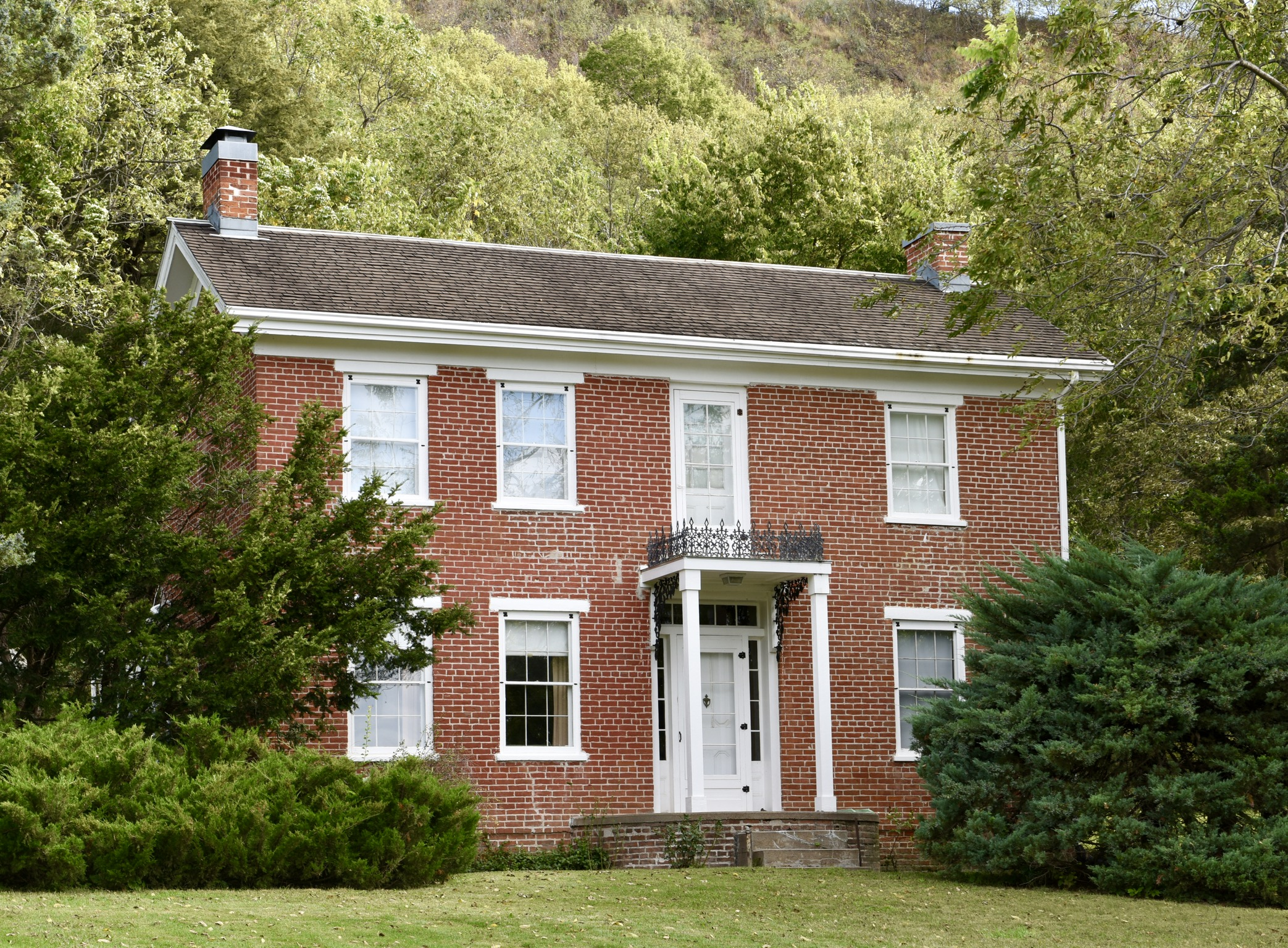
- Baylor Rector House west of Sidney

- Location in Fremont County
- Coordinates: 40°44′52″N 95°40′36″W
- Country: United States
- State: Iowa
- County: Fremont

Area
  - Total: 73.4 sq mi (190.1 km^{2})
  - Land: 73.23 sq mi (189.67 km^{2})
  - Water: 0.17 sq mi (0.43 km^{2}) 0.22%
- Elevation: 1,047 ft (319 m)

Population (2010)
  - Total: 1,741
  - Density: 24/sq mi (9.2/km^{2})
- Time zone: UTC-6 (CST)
  - Summer (DST): UTC-5 (CDT)
- ZIP codes: 51640, 51648, 51652, 51654
- GNIS feature ID: 0468706

Sidney Township is one of thirteen townships in Fremont County, Iowa, United States. As of the 2010 census, its population was 1,741 and it contained 767 housing units.

== Geography ==
As of the 2010 census, Sidney Township covered an area of 73.4 square miles (190 km^{2}); of this, 73.23 square miles (189.7 km^{2}) (99.78 percent) was land and 0.16 square miles (0.41 km^{2}) (0.22 percent) was water.

=== Cities, towns, villages ===
- Anderson
- Sidney

=== Cemeteries ===
The township contains Abshire Cemetery, Acord Cemetery, Benson Cemetery, Fremont County Cemetery, Grandview Cemetery, Hume Cemetery, Knox Cemetery, Lacy Cemetery, Parsley Cemetery, Rector Cemetery, Redd Cemetery and Sidney Cemetery.

=== Transportation ===
- Iowa Highway 2
- U.S. Route 275

== School districts ==
- Sidney Community School District

== Political districts ==
- Iowa's 3rd congressional district
- State House District 23
- State Senate District 12
