= Washington Township, Fremont County, Iowa =

Washington Township
- Township
- Location in Fremont County
- Coordinates: 40°38′29″N 95°41′51″W
- Country: United States
- State: Iowa
- County: Fremont

Area
  - Total: 51.24 sq mi (132.71 km^{2})
  - Land: 50.62 sq mi (131.11 km^{2})
  - Water: 0.62 sq mi (1.6 km^{2}) 1.21%
- Elevation: 915 ft (279 m)

Population (2010)
  - Total: 350
  - Density: 7.0/sq mi (2.7/km^{2})
- Time zone: UTC-6 (CST)
  - Summer (DST): UTC-5 (CDT)
- ZIP codes: 51640, 51648, 51652
- GNIS feature ID: 0468916

Washington Township is one of thirteen townships in Fremont County, Iowa, United States. As of the 2010 census, its population was 350 and it contained 155 housing units.

== Geography ==
As of the 2010 census, Washington Township covered an area of 51.24 square miles (132.7 km^{2}); of this, 50.62 square miles (131.1 km^{2}) (98.79 percent) was land and 0.62 square miles (1.6 km^{2}) (1.21 percent) was water.

Lower Hamburg Island, an island of the Missouri River, is located in the southwesternmost portion of the township but is mostly located in Atchison County, Missouri. It contains the southwesternmost point in Iowa.

=== Cemeteries ===
The township contains Austin Cemetery, Baker Cemetery, Brown Cemetery, Buckham Cemetery, Frost Cemetery, Hamburg Cemetery, Lovelady Cemetery, Means Cemetery, Saint Marys Cemetery and Slusher Cemetery.

=== Transportation ===
- Interstate 29
- Iowa Highway 2
- Iowa Highway 333
- U.S. Route 275

== School districts ==
- Hamburg Community School District
- Sidney Community School District

== Political districts ==
- Iowa's 3rd congressional district
- State House District 23
- State Senate District 12
