= Middle Fork Township, Ringgold County, Iowa =

Township in Ringgold County, Iowa

Coordinates: 40°36′N 94°18′W

Middle Fork Township is a township in Ringgold County, Iowa, USA.
