= Waubonsie Township, Ringgold County, Iowa =

Township in Ringgold County, Iowa, U.S.

Coordinates: 40.7113°N 94.3572°W

Waubonsie Township is a township in Ringgold County, Iowa, USA.
