= Decatur Township, Decatur County, Iowa =

Decatur Township
- Township
- Location in Decatur County
- Coordinates: 40°45′59″N 93°50′13″W
- Country: United States
- State: Iowa
- County: Decatur

Area
  - Total: 35.77 sq mi (92.65 km^{2})
  - Land: 35.6 sq mi (92.3 km^{2})
  - Water: 0.14 sq mi (0.35 km^{2}) 0.38%
- Elevation: 1,102 ft (336 m)

Population (2000)
  - Total: 425
  - Density: 12/sq mi (4.6/km^{2})
- GNIS feature ID: 0467689

Decatur Township is a township in Decatur County, Iowa, United States. As of the 2000 census, its population was 425.

== Geography ==
Decatur Township covers an area of 35.77 square miles (92.65 square kilometers); of this, 0.14 square miles (0.35 square kilometers) or 0.38 percent is water. The streams of Long Creek and Marks Branch run through this township.

=== Cities and towns ===
- Decatur City

=== Adjacent townships ===
- Long Creek Township (north)
- Franklin Township (northeast)
- Center Township (east)
- Eden Township (southeast)
- Burrell Township (south)
- Bloomington Township (southwest)
- Grand River Township (west)
- Richland Township (northwest)

=== Cemeteries ===
The township contains six cemeteries: Cash, Decatur City, Palenstine, Shy, Waller and Woodmansee.

=== Major highways ===
- Interstate 35
