= Rice Township, Ringgold County, Iowa =

Township in Ringgold County, Iowa, U.S.

Coordinates: 40°41′N 94°18′W

Rice Township is a township in Ringgold County, Iowa, USA.
