= Delphos, Iowa =

- Census-designated place
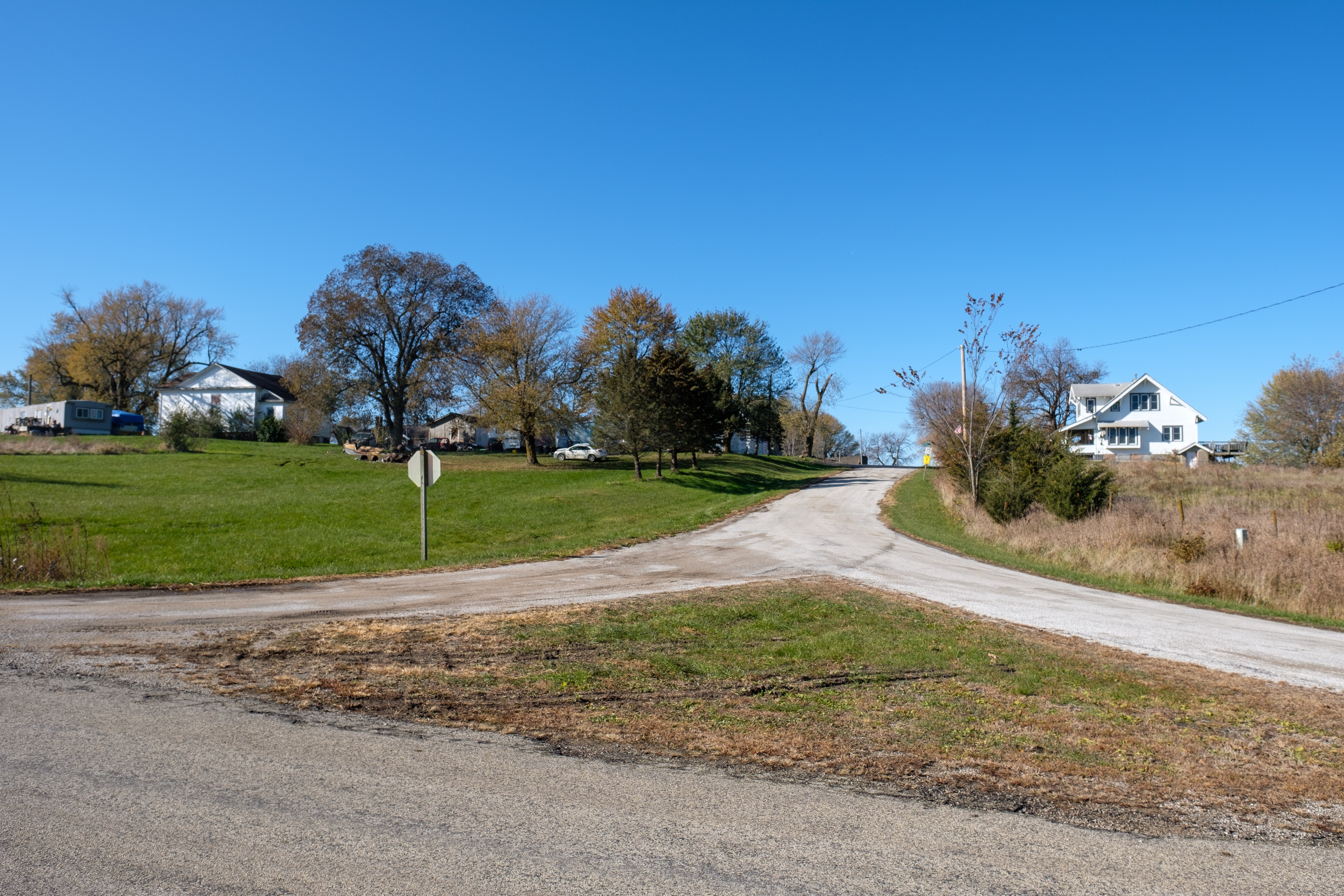
- View of Main Street from Boundary Street

- Location of Delphos, Iowa
- Coordinates: 40°39′47″N 94°20′25″W
- Country: USA
- State: Iowa
- County: Ringgold

Area
  - Total: 0.22 sq mi (0.58 km^{2})
  - Land: 0.22 sq mi (0.58 km^{2})
  - Water: 0 sq mi (0.00 km^{2})
- Elevation: 1,132 ft (345 m)

Population (2020)
  - Total: 26
  - Density: 116.8/sq mi (45.11/km^{2})
- Time zone: UTC-6 (Central (CST))
  - Summer (DST): UTC-5 (CDT)
- ZIP code: 50860
- Area code: 641
- FIPS code: 19-19810
- GNIS feature ID: 2804460

Delphos (Note: /ˈdɛlfəs/) is a former city in Ringgold County, Iowa, United States. Delphos is now a census-designated place (CDP). In 2017 the community of Delphos voted to disincorporate. This was approved by the Ringgold County Board of Supervisors in 2018.

The population was 26 at the 2020 census.

== History ==
Delphos was founded in 1880 as Borneo on the Leon, Mount Ayr and Southwestern Railroad. The community had rail service until 1945 and a post office from its inception until 1993. The community was the only incorporated town in Ringgold County to not have a bank, athough it once had stores, a blacksmith shop, and a hotel. Only a few homes comprise the town, with a few desacralized churches still standing as of 2022.

== Geography ==
According to the United States Census Bureau, the city has a total area of 0.22 square miles (0.57 km^{2}), all land.

== Demographics ==
Historical populations
Year	Pop.	±%
1930	79	—
1940	90	+13.9%
1950	74	−17.8%
1960	48	−35.1%
1970	35	−27.1%
1980	45	+28.6%
1990	23	−48.9%
2000	25	+8.7%
2010	25	+0.0%
2020	26	+4.0%
Source:"U.S. Census website". United States Census Bureau. and Iowa Data Center; Source: U.S. Decennial Census

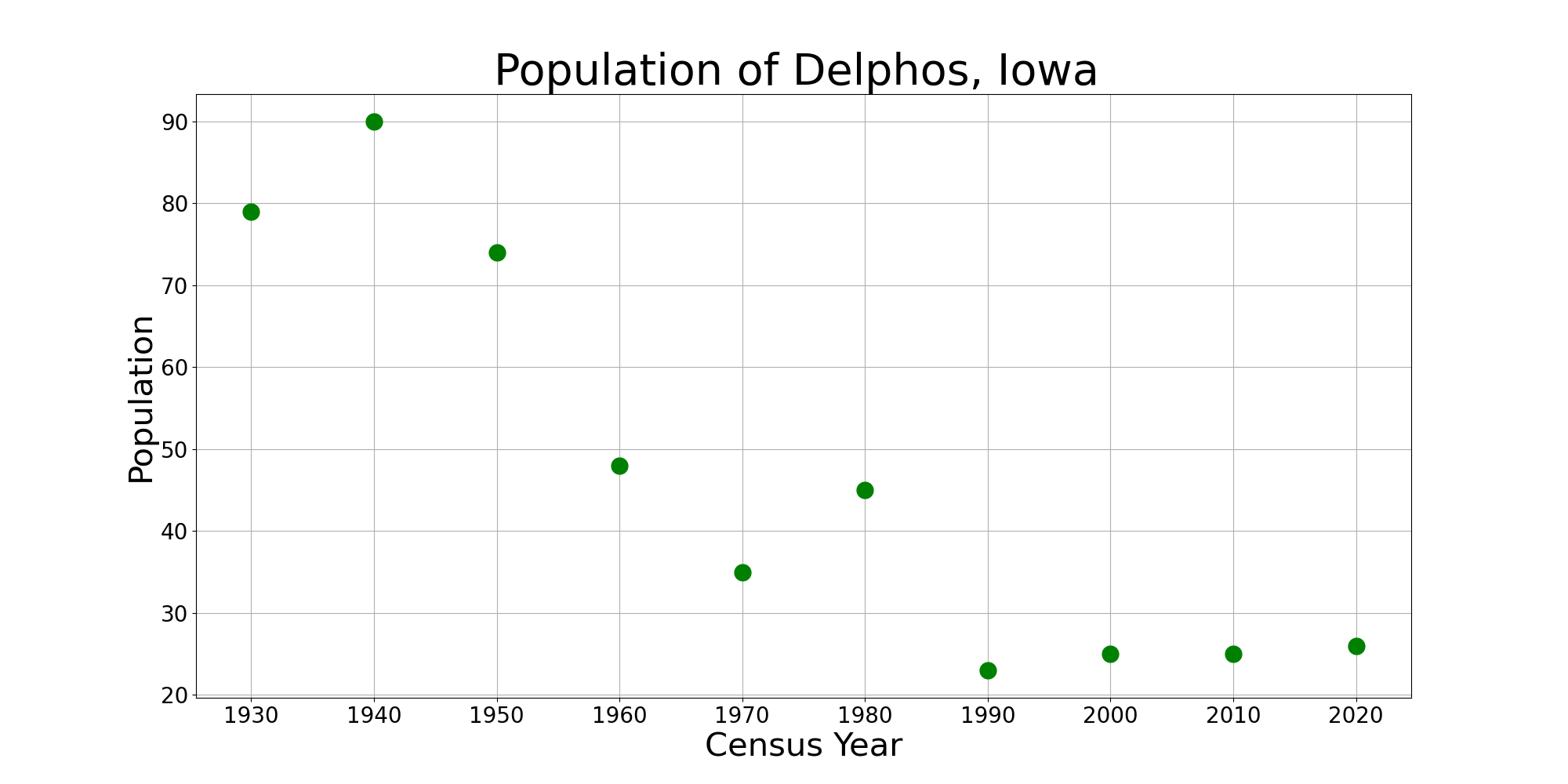
The population of Delphos, Iowa from US census data

=== 2020 census ===
As of the census of 2020, there were 26 people, 13 households, and 9 families residing in the community. The population density was 116.8 inhabitants per square mile (45.1/km^{2}). There were 14 housing units at an average density of 62.9 per square mile (24.3/km^{2}). The racial makeup of the community was 96.2% White, 0.0% Black or African American, 0.0% Native American, 0.0% Asian, 0.0% Pacific Islander, 0.0% from other races and 3.8% from two or more races. Hispanic or Latino persons of any race comprised 0.0% of the population.

Of the 13 households, 23.1% of which had children under the age of 18 living with them, 69.2% were married couples living together, 0.0% were cohabitating couples, 23.1% had a female householder with no spouse or partner present and 7.7% had a male householder with no spouse or partner present. 30.8% of all households were non-families. 30.8% of all households were made up of individuals, 15.4% had someone living alone who was 65 years old or older.

The median age in the community was 56.5 years. 0.0% of the residents were under the age of 20; 0.0% were between the ages of 20 and 24; 26.9% were from 25 and 44; 42.3% were from 45 and 64; and 30.8% were 65 years of age or older. The gender makeup of the community was 69.2% male and 30.8% female.

=== 2010 census ===
As of the census of 2010, there were 25 people, 11 households, and 7 families living in the city. The population density was 113.6 inhabitants per square mile (43.9/km^{2}). There were 15 housing units at an average density of 68.2 per square mile (26.3/km^{2}). The racial makeup of the city was 100.0% White.

There were 11 households, of which 18.2% had children under the age of 18 living with them, 63.6% were married couples living together, and 36.4% were non-families. 36.4% of all households were made up of individuals, and 18.2% had someone living alone who was 65 years of age or older. The average household size was 2.27 and the average family size was 3.00.

The median age in the city was 50.8 years. 24% of residents were under the age of 18; 0.0% were between the ages of 18 and 24; 16% were from 25 to 44; 32% were from 45 to 64; and 28% were 65 years of age or older. The gender makeup of the city was 48.0% male and 52.0% female.

=== 2000 census ===
As of the census of 2000, there were 25 people, 12 households, and 6 families living in the city. The population density was 112.1 inhabitants per square mile (43.3/km^{2}). There were 14 housing units at an average density of 62.8 per square mile (24.2/km^{2}). The racial makeup of the city was 100.00% White.

There were 12 households, out of which 25.0% had children under the age of 18 living with them, 50.0% were married couples living together, and 50.0% were non-families. 41.7% of all households were made up of individuals, and 25.0% had someone living alone who was 65 years of age or older. The average household size was 2.08 and the average family size was 3.00.

In the city, the population was spread out, with 16.0% under the age of 18, 20.0% from 18 to 24, 12.0% from 25 to 44, 32.0% from 45 to 64, and 20.0% who were 65 years of age or older. The median age was 46 years. For every 100 females, there were 108.3 males. For every 100 females age 18 and over, there were 90.9 males.

The median income for a household in the city was $33,125, and the median income for a family was $33,125. Males had a median income of $0 versus $42,917 for females. The per capita income for the city was $13,925. None of the population and none of the families were below the poverty line.

== Education ==
Mount Ayr Community School District operates public schools serving the community.

== See also ==
- List of Discontinued cities in Iowa
