= Jefferson Township, Ringgold County, Iowa =

Township in Iowa, USA

Coordinates: 40°51′N 94°18′W

Jefferson Township is a township in Ringgold County, Iowa, USA.
