= Redding, Iowa =

- City
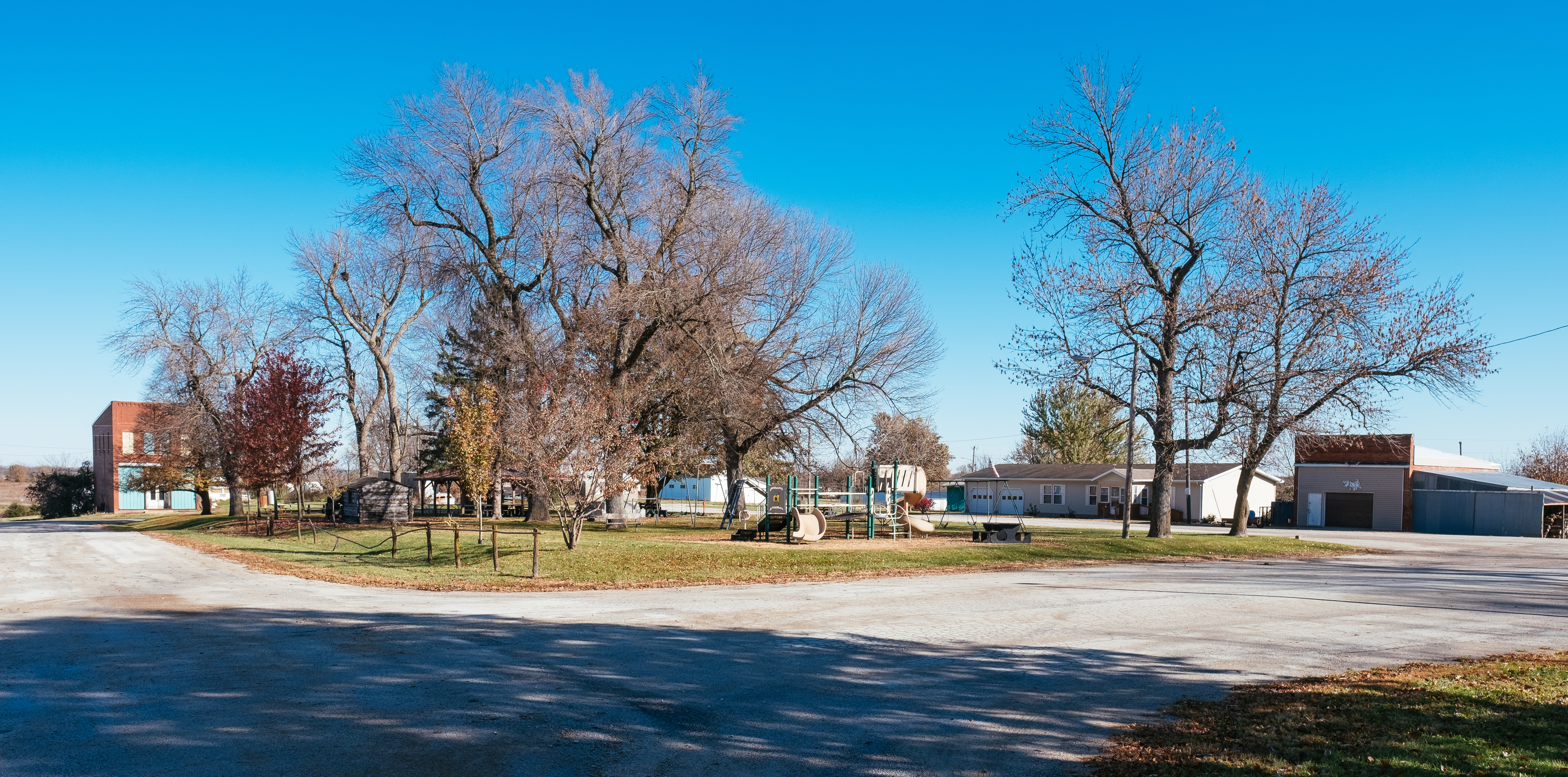
- Redding City Park

- Location of Redding, Iowa
- Coordinates: 40°36′24″N 94°23′11″W
- Country: USA
- State: Iowa
- County: Ringgold

Area
  - Total: 1.00 sq mi (2.59 km^{2})
  - Land: 0.99 sq mi (2.56 km^{2})
  - Water: 0.0077 sq mi (0.02 km^{2})
- Elevation: 1,135 ft (346 m)

Population (2020)
  - Total: 63
  - Density: 63.7/sq mi (24.58/km^{2})
- Time zone: UTC-6 (Central (CST))
  - Summer (DST): UTC-5 (CDT)
- ZIP code: 50860
- Area code: 641
- FIPS code: 19-66000
- GNIS feature ID: 2396339

Redding is a city in southwest Ringgold County, Iowa, United States. It has a total area of 1.01 square miles (2.62 km^{2}), of which 1.00 square mile (2.59 km^{2}) is land and 0.01 square miles (0.03 km^{2}) is water, and the population was 63 at the time of the 2020 census.

== Middlefork Methodist Episcopal Church ==
- Middlefork Methodist Episcopal Church
- U.S. National Register of Historic Places
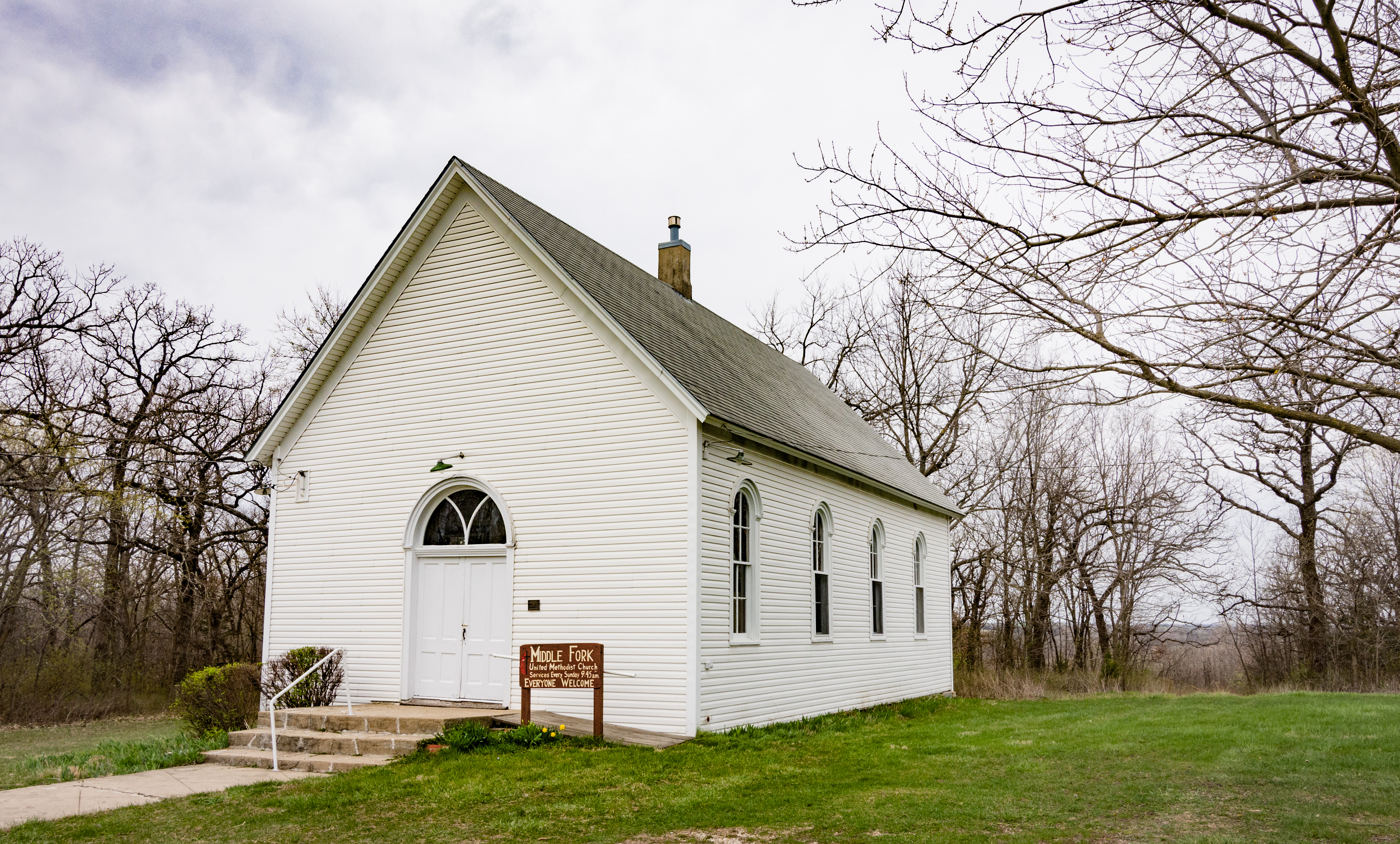
- Location: S of US 169 on E side of Middle Fork, Grand R., Redding, Iowa
- Area: less than one acre
- Built: 1886
- Built by: W.M. Staton, J.H. Savill
- Architectural style: Italianate
- NRHP reference No.: 90001801
- Added to NRHP: November 29, 1990

Middlefork Methodist Episcopal Church, also known as Middlefork United Methodist Church, is a historic church south of US 169 on the east side of Middle Fork, Grand Road. It is a rectangular-plan structure that measures 26 by 44 feet (7.9 by 13.4 m). The exterior is covered with white clapboard siding, and it rests on a limestone foundation. Overall the building is plain. Italianate features include the tall, narrow, round hooded windows along the sides, the double-door entryway on the front, the corner boards with capitals, frieze board trim, round hood molds above the windows and the main entrance, and moldings at the eaves.

Methodist classes were organized at the Center (renamed Rose Hill) and Clipper schoolhouses in the early 1870s. The impetus to establish Middlefork Church was a six-week revival held under the leadership of the Rev. T.G. Aten and conducted by the Rev. Bill McFarland in the Spring of 1886. The schoolhouses were no longer large enough to hold the number of people who attended services. Property adjacent to the centrally located Middle Fork Cemetery was chosen for the new congregation to build a church, and all the funds necessary to build the church were in hand when construction began. Stone for the foundation was quarried on the Riley Motsinger farm a few miles north of Allendale, Missouri. The bricks and lumber came from Bedford, Iowa. Local carpenters W. M. Staton and J. A. Saville oversaw the construction. Construction was begun and completed in 1886. The church building was added to the National Register of Historic Places in 1990.

== Demographics ==
Historical populations
| Year | Pop. | ±% |
|---|---|---|
| 1880 | 85 | — |
| 1890 | 214 | +151.8% |
| 1900 | 311 | +45.3% |
| 1910 | 269 | −13.5% |
| 1920 | 289 | +7.4% |
| 1930 | 272 | −5.9% |
| 1940 | 246 | −9.6% |
| 1950 | 200 | −18.7% |
| 1960 | 129 | −35.5% |
| 1970 | 111 | −14.0% |
| 1980 | 91 | −18.0% |
| 1990 | 119 | +30.8% |
| 2000 | 78 | −34.5% |
| 2010 | 82 | +5.1% |
| 2020 | 63 | −23.2% |
Source:"U.S. Census website". United States Census Bureau. and Iowa Data Center; Source: U.S. Decennial Census

=== 2020 census ===
As of the census of 2020, there were 63 people, 34 households, and 22 families residing in the city. The population density was 63.7 inhabitants per square mile (24.6/km^{2}). There were 36 housing units at an average density of 36.4 per square mile (14.0/km^{2}). The racial makeup of the city was 95.2% White, 0.0% Black or African American, 0.0% Native American, 1.6% Asian, 0.0% Pacific Islander, 0.0% from other races and 3.2% from two or more races. Hispanic or Latino persons of any race comprised 0.0% of the population.

Of the 34 households, 35.3% of which had children under the age of 18 living with them, 44.1% were married couples living together, 11.8% were cohabitating couples, 32.4% had a female householder with no spouse or partner present and 11.8% had a male householder with no spouse or partner present. 35.3% of all households were non-families. 32.4% of all households were made up of individuals, 11.8% had someone living alone who was 65 years old or older.

The median age in the city was 56.5 years. 25.4% of the residents were under the age of 20; 3.2% were between the ages of 20 and 24; 12.7% were from 25 and 44; 28.6% were from 45 and 64; and 30.2% were 65 years of age or older. The gender makeup of the city was 44.4% male and 55.6% female.

=== 2010 census ===
As of the census of 2010, there were 82 people, 37 households, and 21 families living in the city. The population density was 82.0 inhabitants per square mile (31.7/km^{2}). There were 42 housing units at an average density of 42.0 per square mile (16.2/km^{2}). The racial makeup of the city was 100.0% White.

There were 37 households, of which 21.6% had children under the age of 18 living with them, 48.6% were married couples living together, 2.7% had a female householder with no husband present, 5.4% had a male householder with no wife present, and 43.2% were non-families. 35.1% of all households were made up of individuals, and 29.7% had someone living alone who was 65 years of age or older. The average household size was 2.22 and the average family size was 2.95.

The median age in the city was 51.5 years. 24.4% of residents were under the age of 18; 3.7% were between the ages of 18 and 24; 14.7% were from 25 to 44; 36.6% were from 45 to 64; and 20.7% were 65 years of age or older. The gender makeup of the city was 50.0% male and 50.0% female.

=== 2000 census ===
As of the census of 2000, there were 78 people, 35 households, and 24 families living in the city. The population density was 77.6 inhabitants per square mile (30.0/km^{2}). There were 41 housing units at an average density of 40.8 per square mile (15.8/km^{2}). The racial makeup of the city was 100.00% White.

There were 35 households, out of which 20.0% had children under the age of 18 living with them, 60.0% were married couples living together, 2.9% had a female householder with no husband present, and 31.4% were non-families. 25.7% of all households were made up of individuals, and 14.3% had someone living alone who was 65 years of age or older. The average household size was 2.23 and the average family size was 2.71.

In the city, the population was spread out, with 17.9% under the age of 18, 3.8% from 18 to 24, 24.4% from 25 to 44, 34.6% from 45 to 64, and 19.2% who were 65 years of age or older. The median age was 47 years. For every 100 females, there were 110.8 males. For every 100 females age 18 and over, there were 113.3 males.

The median income for a household in the city was $13,750, and the median income for a family was $36,250. Males had a median income of $24,375 versus $23,750 for females. The per capita income for the city was $10,144. There were 22.2% of families and 30.2% of the population living below the poverty line, including 15.8% of under eighteens and 40.0% of those over 64.

== Education ==
Mount Ayr Community School District operates public schools serving the community.
