= Benton, Iowa =

- City
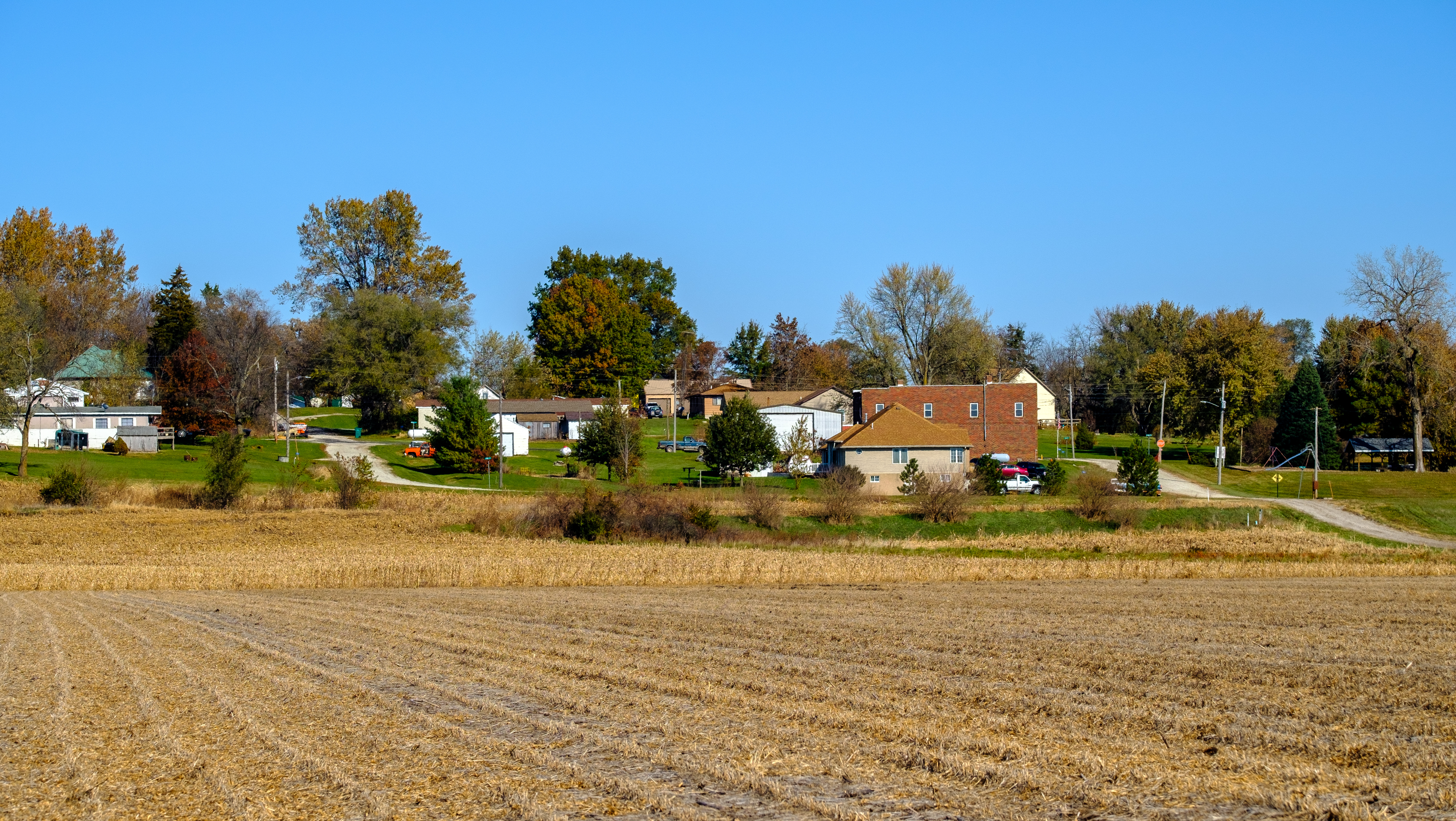
- View from the South

- Location of Benton, Iowa
- Coordinates: 40°42′17″N 94°21′39″W
- Country: USA
- State: Iowa
- County: Ringgold

Area
  - Total: 0.76 sq mi (1.97 km^{2})
  - Land: 0.76 sq mi (1.96 km^{2})
  - Water: 0.0039 sq mi (0.01 km^{2})
- Elevation: 1,060 ft (320 m)

Population (2020)
  - Total: 39
  - Density: 52/sq mi (19.9/km^{2})
- Time zone: UTC-6 (Central (CST))
  - Summer (DST): UTC-5 (CDT)
- ZIP code: 50835
- Area code: 641
- FIPS code: 19-05905
- GNIS feature ID: 2394141

Benton is a city in Ringgold County, Iowa, United States. The population was 39 at the 2020 census.

== Geography ==
According to the United States Census Bureau, the city has a total area of 0.64 square miles (1.66 km^{2}), all land.

== Demographics ==
Historical populations
Year	Pop.	±%
1900	192	—
1910	191	−0.5%
1920	246	+28.8%
1930	173	−29.7%
1940	189	+9.2%
1950	128	−32.3%
1960	84	−34.4%
1970	46	−45.2%
1980	33	−28.3%
1990	39	+18.2%
2000	40	+2.6%
2010	41	+2.5%
2020	39	−4.9%
Source:"U.S. Census website". United States Census Bureau. and Iowa Data Center; Source: U.S. Decennial Census

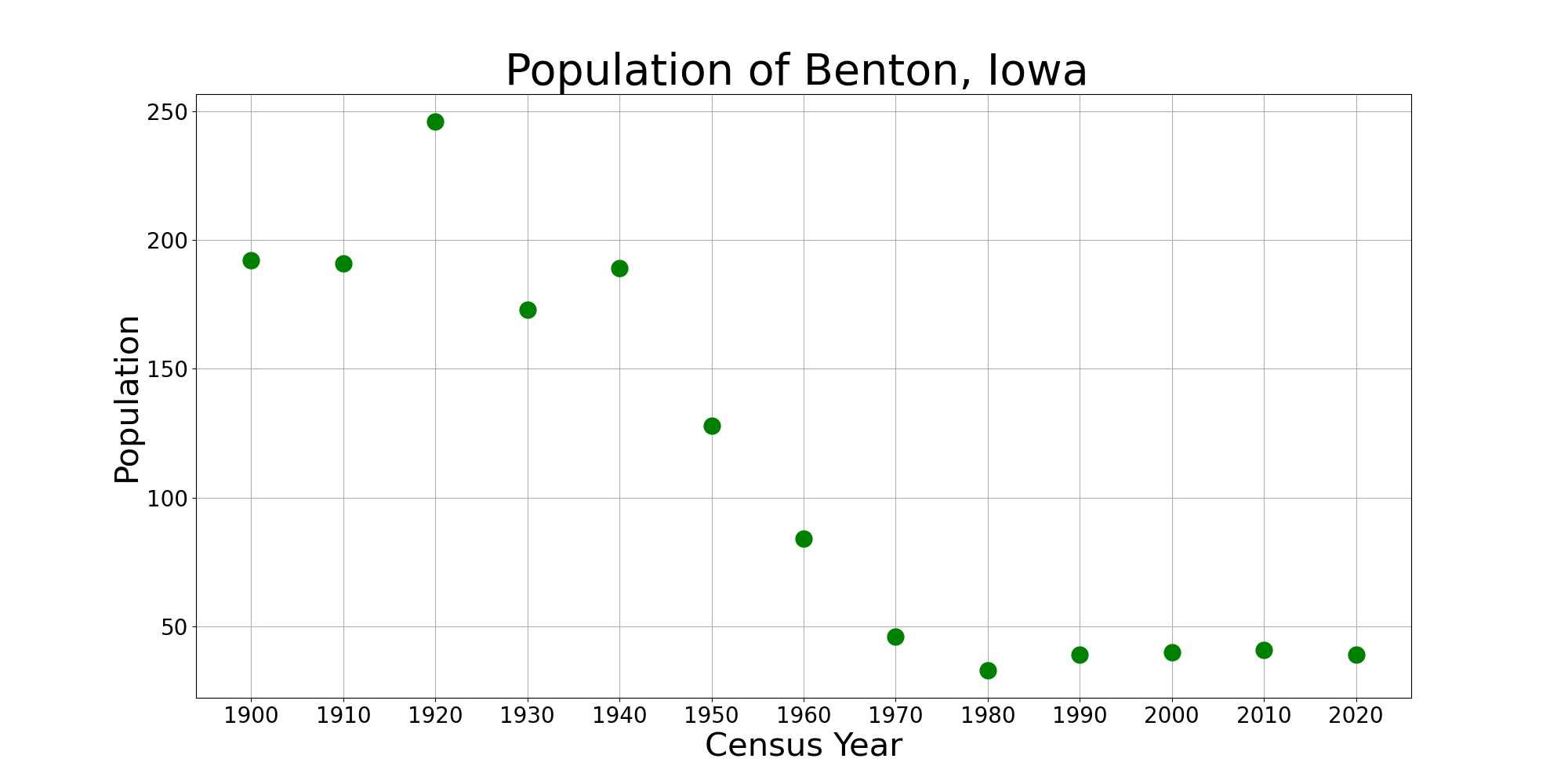
The population of Benton, Iowa from US census data

=== 2020 census ===
As of the census of 2020, there were 39 people, 19 households, and 15 families residing in the city. The population density was 51.5 inhabitants per square mile (19.9/km^{2}). There were 19 housing units at an average density of 25.1 per square mile (9.7/km^{2}). The racial makeup of the city was 100.0% White, 0.0% Black or African American, 0.0% Native American, 0.0% Asian, 0.0% Pacific Islander, 0.0% from other races and 0.0% from two or more races. Hispanic or Latino persons of any race comprised 0.0% of the population.

Of the 19 households, 31.6% of which had children under the age of 18 living with them, 63.2% were married couples living together, 0.0% were cohabitating couples, 15.8% had a female householder with no spouse or partner present and 21.1% had a male householder with no spouse or partner present. 21.1% of all households were non-families. 21.1% of all households were made up of individuals, 5.3% had someone living alone who was 65 years old or older.

The median age in the city was 51.3 years. 25.6% of the residents were under the age of 20; 0.0% were between the ages of 20 and 24; 15.4% were from 25 and 44; 30.8% were from 45 and 64; and 28.2% were 65 years of age or older. The gender makeup of the city was 48.7% male and 51.3% female.

=== 2010 census ===
As of the census of 2010, there were 41 people, 18 households, and 13 families living in the city. The population density was 64.1 inhabitants per square mile (24.7/km^{2}). There were 21 housing units at an average density of 32.8 per square mile (12.7/km^{2}). The racial makeup of the city was 95.1% White, 2.4% from other races, and 2.4% from two or more races. Hispanic or Latino of any race were 4.9% of the population.

There were 18 households, of which 16.7% had children under the age of 18 living with them, 72.2% were married couples living together, and 27.8% were non-families. 16.7% of all households were made up of individuals. The average household size was 2.28 and the average family size was 2.62.

The median age in the city was 53.5 years. 12.2% of residents were under the age of 18; 9.7% were between the ages of 18 and 24; 9.7% were from 25 to 44; 48.9% were from 45 to 64; and 19.5% were 65 years of age or older. The gender makeup of the city was 58.5% male and 41.5% female.

=== 2000 census ===
As of the census of 2000, there were 40 people, 19 households, and 14 families living in the city. The population density was 59.8 inhabitants per square mile (23.1/km^{2}). There were 20 housing units at an average density of 29.9 per square mile (11.5/km^{2}). The racial makeup of the city was 100.00% White. Hispanic or Latino of any race were 2.50% of the population.

There were 19 households, out of which 10.5% had children under the age of 18 living with them, 68.4% were married couples living together, and 26.3% were non-families. 26.3% of all households were made up of individuals, and 10.5% had someone living alone who was 65 years of age or older. The average household size was 2.11 and the average family size was 2.43.

In the city, the population was spread out, with 10.0% under the age of 18, 7.5% from 18 to 24, 22.5% from 25 to 44, 32.5% from 45 to 64, and 27.5% who were 65 years of age or older. The median age was 52 years. For every 100 females, there were 166.7 males. For every 100 females age 18 and over, there were 140.0 males.

The median income for a household in the city was $26,250, and the median income for a family was $29,375. Males had a median income of $16,875 versus $16,250 for females. The per capita income for the city was $15,752. None of the population and none of the families were below the poverty line.

== Education ==
Mount Ayr Community School District operates public schools serving the community.

== Notable people ==
- Lemuel de Bra (1884–1954), a writer of short stories, was born in Benton.
