= Riley Township, Ringgold County, Iowa =

Township in Iowa, United States

Coordinates: 40°36′N 94°04′W

Riley Township is a township in Ringgold County, Iowa, United States.
