= Ringgold County, Iowa =

County in Iowa, United States

- County
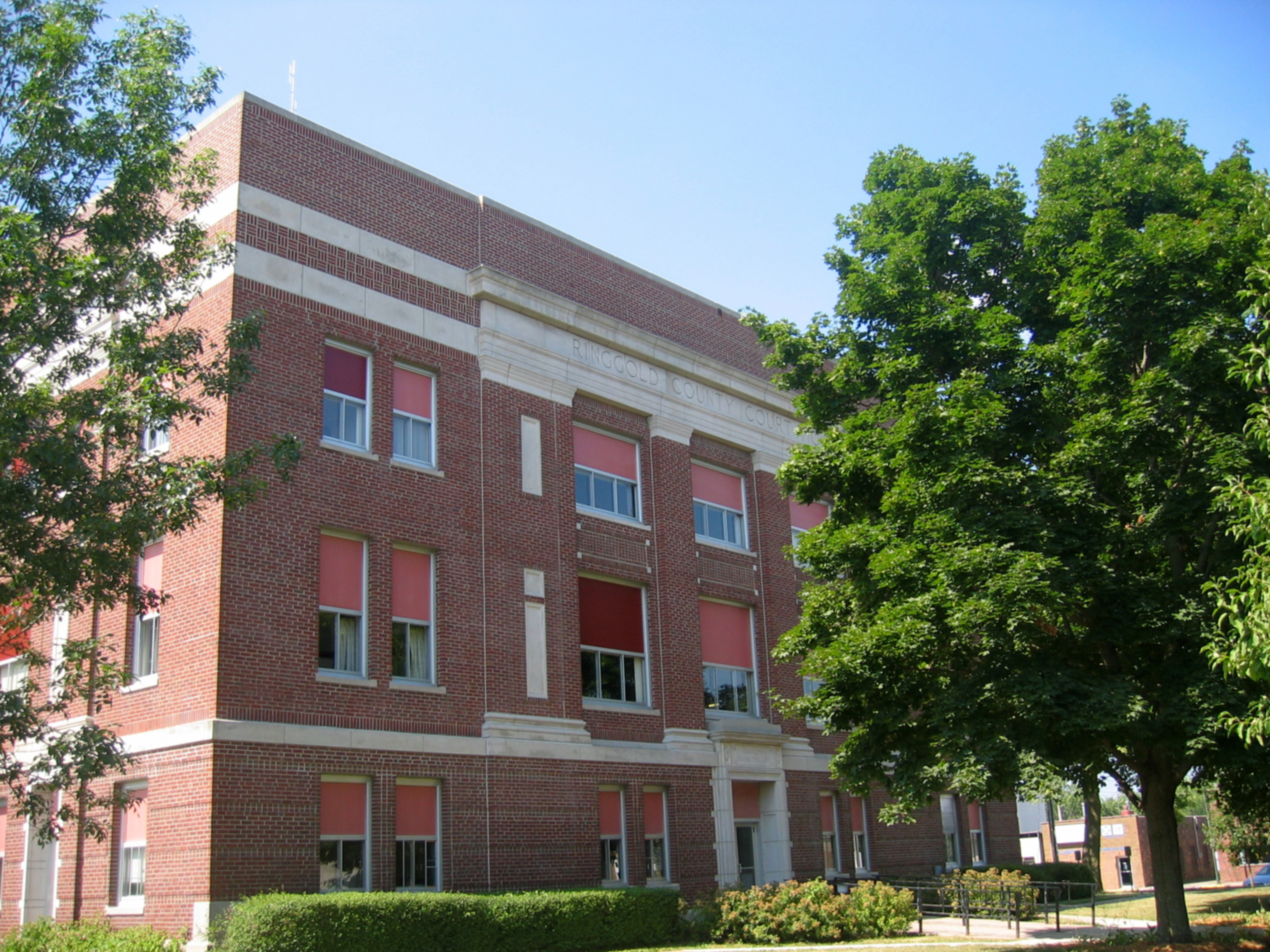
- The Ringgold County Courthouse in Mount Ayr

- Location within the U.S. state of Iowa
- Coordinates: 40°43′56″N 94°14′53″W
- Country: United States
- State: Iowa
- Founded: February 24, 1847
- Named for: Samuel Ringgold
- Seat: Mount Ayr
- Largest city: Mount Ayr

Area
  - Total: 539 sq mi (1,400 km^{2})
  - Land: 535 sq mi (1,390 km^{2})
  - Water: 3.4 sq mi (8.8 km^{2}) 0.6%

Population (2020)
  - Total: 4,663
  - Estimate (2025): 4,642 ▼
  - Density: 8.72/sq mi (3.37/km^{2})
- Time zone: UTC−6 (Central)
  - Summer (DST): UTC−5 (CDT)
- Congressional district: 3rd
- Website: www.ringgoldcounty.iowa.gov
- Iowa county number 80

Ringgold County is a county located in the U.S. state of Iowa. As of the 2020 census, the population was 4,663, and was estimated to be 4,642 in 2025, making it the second-least populous county in Iowa. The county seat and the largest city is Mount Ayr. The county is named after Maj. Samuel Ringgold, a hero of the Battle of Palo Alto fought in May 1846, during the Mexican–American War. It is one of the 26 Iowa counties with a name that is unique across the nation.

== Geography ==
According to the United States Census Bureau, the county has a total area of 539 square miles (1,400 km^{2}), of which 535 square miles (1,390 km^{2}) is land and 3.4 square miles (8.8 km^{2}) (0.6%) is water.

=== Major highways ===
- U.S. Highway 169
- Iowa Highway 2
- Iowa Highway 25

=== Adjacent counties ===
- Union County (north)
- Decatur County (east)
- Harrison County, Missouri (southeast)
- Worth County, Missouri (southwest)
- Taylor County (west)

== Demographics ==
Historical population
Census	Pop.	Note	%±
1860	2,923		—
1870	5,691		94.7%
1880	12,085		112.4%
1890	13,556		12.2%
1900	15,325		13.0%
1910	12,904		−15.8%
1920	12,919		0.1%
1930	11,966		−7.4%
1940	11,137		−6.9%
1950	9,528		−14.4%
1960	7,910		−17.0%
1970	6,373		−19.4%
1980	6,112		−4.1%
1990	5,420		−11.3%
2000	5,469		0.9%
2010	5,131		−6.2%
2020	4,663		−9.1%
2025 (est.)	4,642	▼	−0.5%
U.S. Decennial Census; 1790–1960 1900–1990; 1990–2000 2010–2020

=== 2020 census ===
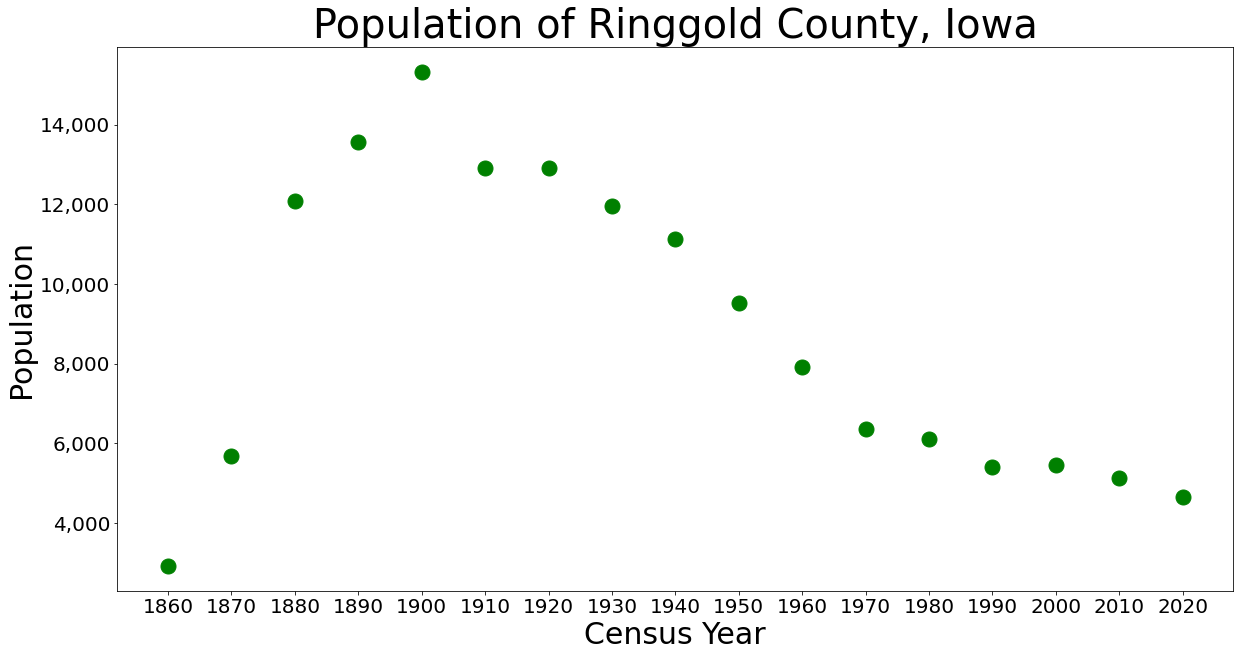
Population of Ringgold County from the U.S. census data

As of the 2020 census, the county had a population of 4,663, which yielded a population density of 8.6/sq mi (3.3/km^{2}). The median age was 46.0 years, with 22.3% of residents under the age of 18 and 26.3% of residents 65 years of age or older. For every 100 females there were 97.1 males, and for every 100 females age 18 and over there were 94.1 males age 18 and over.

96.7% of residents reported being of one race. The racial makeup of the county was 95.8% White, 0.1% Black or African American, 0.2% American Indian and Alaska Native, 0.2% Asian, <0.1% Native Hawaiian and Pacific Islander, 0.4% from some other race, and 3.3% from two or more races. Hispanic or Latino residents of any race comprised 1.5% of the population.

<0.1% of residents lived in urban areas, while 100.0% lived in rural areas.

There were 1,945 households in the county, of which 26.3% had children under the age of 18 living in them. Of all households, 54.4% were married-couple households, 17.5% were households with a male householder and no spouse or partner present, and 23.2% were households with a female householder and no spouse or partner present. About 29.1% of all households were made up of individuals and 14.9% had someone living alone who was 65 years of age or older.

There were 2,672 housing units, of which 27.2% were vacant. Among occupied housing units, 77.2% were owner-occupied and 22.8% were renter-occupied. The homeowner vacancy rate was 1.6% and the rental vacancy rate was 13.9%.

=== 2010 census ===
The 2010 census recorded a population of 5,131 in the county, with a population density of 9.5/sq mi (3.7/km^{2}). There were 2,613 housing units, of which 2,047 were occupied.

=== 2000 census ===
As of the census of 2000, there were 5,469 people, 2,245 households, and 1,537 families in the county. The population density was 10 people per square mile (3.9 people/km^{2}). There were 2,789 housing units at an average density of 5 units per square mile (1.9 units/km^{2}). The racial makeup of the county was 99.07% White, 0.11% Black or African American, 0.22% Native American, 0.16% Asian, 0.02% from other races, and 0.42% from two or more races. 0.24% of the population were Hispanic or Latino of any race.

Of the 2,245 households 27.70% had children under the age of 18 living with them, 59.70% were married couples living together, 5.50% had a female householder with no husband present, and 31.50% were non-families. 28.60% of households were one person and 17.80% were one person aged 65 or older. The average household size was 2.37 and the average family size was 2.90.

The age distribution was 24.00% under the age of 18, 6.90% from 18 to 24, 21.40% from 25 to 44, 23.60% from 45 to 64, and 24.00% 65 or older. The median age was 43 years. For every 100 females there were 94.10 males. For every 100 females age 18 and over, there were 89.40 males.

The median household income was $29,110 and the median family income was $34,472. Males had a median income of $24,583 versus $20,606 for females. The per capita income for the county was $15,023. About 9.40% of families and 14.30% of the population were below the poverty line, including 20.40% of those under age 18 and 16.40% of those age 65 or over.

== Communities ==
=== Cities ===
- Beaconsfield
- Benton
- Clearfield (pt)
- Diagonal
- Ellston
- Kellerton
- Maloy
- Mount Ayr
- Redding
- Shannon City (pt)
- Tingley

=== Census-designated places ===
- Delphos
- Sun Valley Lake

=== Extinct Hamlet ===
- Knowlton

=== Townships ===
- Athens
- Benton
- Clinton
- Grant
- Jefferson
- Liberty
- Lincoln
- Lotts Creek
- Middle Fork
- Monroe
- Poe
- Rice
- Riley
- Tingley
- Union
- Washington
- Waubonsie

=== Population ranking ===
The population ranking of the following table is based on the 2020 census of Ringgold County.

† county seat

Rank	City/Town/etc.	Municipal type	Population (2020 Census)
1	† Mount Ayr	City	1,623
2	Diagonal	City	344
3	Kellerton	City	243
4	Sun Valley Lake	CDP	187
5	Tingley	City	136
6	Redding	City	63
7	Benton	City	39
8	Delphos	CDP	26
9	Maloy	City	22
10	Ellston	City	19
11	Beaconsfield	City	15
12	Clearfield (mostly in Taylor County)	City	6 (278 total)
13	Shannon City (partially in Union County)	City	6 (73 total)

== Politics ==
United States presidential election results for Ringgold County, Iowa
Year	Republican		Democratic		Third party(ies)	
Year	No.	%	No.	%	No.	%
1896	2,209	56.47%	1,651	42.20%	52	1.33%
1900	2,319	62.19%	1,311	35.16%	99	2.65%
1904	2,200	69.38%	835	26.33%	136	4.29%
1908	1,940	61.94%	1,092	34.87%	100	3.19%
1912	916	31.28%	958	32.72%	1,054	36.00%
1916	1,733	55.46%	1,351	43.23%	41	1.31%
1920	3,702	72.66%	1,327	26.05%	66	1.30%
1924	3,147	60.68%	882	17.01%	1,157	22.31%
1928	3,674	69.57%	1,572	29.77%	35	0.66%
1932	2,082	45.04%	2,480	53.64%	61	1.32%
1936	3,316	55.31%	2,615	43.62%	64	1.07%
1940	3,507	59.50%	2,374	40.28%	13	0.22%
1944	2,767	59.35%	1,867	40.05%	28	0.60%
1948	2,487	55.77%	1,922	43.10%	50	1.12%
1952	3,442	70.66%	1,408	28.91%	21	0.43%
1956	2,713	60.42%	1,775	39.53%	2	0.04%
1960	2,538	58.74%	1,781	41.22%	2	0.05%
1964	1,571	40.91%	2,260	58.85%	9	0.23%
1968	1,986	57.05%	1,237	35.54%	258	7.41%
1972	2,264	68.54%	1,003	30.37%	36	1.09%
1976	1,543	46.25%	1,739	52.13%	54	1.62%
1980	1,884	57.95%	1,150	35.37%	217	6.67%
1984	1,512	48.51%	1,593	51.11%	12	0.38%
1988	1,110	40.64%	1,609	58.92%	12	0.44%
1992	967	33.71%	1,341	46.74%	561	19.55%
1996	967	35.29%	1,439	52.52%	334	12.19%
2000	1,369	50.85%	1,246	46.29%	77	2.86%
2004	1,466	52.77%	1,286	46.29%	26	0.94%
2008	1,401	52.10%	1,236	45.97%	52	1.93%
2012	1,368	52.64%	1,186	45.63%	45	1.73%
2016	1,824	67.38%	753	27.82%	130	4.80%
2020	1,968	72.51%	709	26.12%	37	1.36%
2024	2,015	75.02%	638	23.75%	33	1.23%

== Education ==
School districts include:

- Bedford Community School District
- Creston Community School District
- Diagonal Community School District
- East Union Community School District
- Lamoni Community School District
- Lenox Community School District
- Mount Ayr Community School District

Former school districts:

- Clearfield Community School District - Dissolved on July 1, 2014.

== See also ==
- National Register of Historic Places listings in Ringgold County, Iowa
- Ringgold County Courthouse
