= Union Township, Ringgold County, Iowa =

Township in Ringgold County, Iowa, U.S.

Union Township
- Township
- Interactive map of Union Township
- Coordinates: 40°51′N 94°04′W
- Country: United States
- State: Iowa
- County: Ringgold

Union Township is a township in Ringgold County, Iowa, United States.
