= Athens Township, Ringgold County, Iowa =

Township in Ringgold County, Iowa, United States

Coordinates: 40°41′N 94°04′W

Athens Township is a township in Ringgold County, Iowa, United States.
