= Buchanan Creek =

Stream in Iowa, U.S.

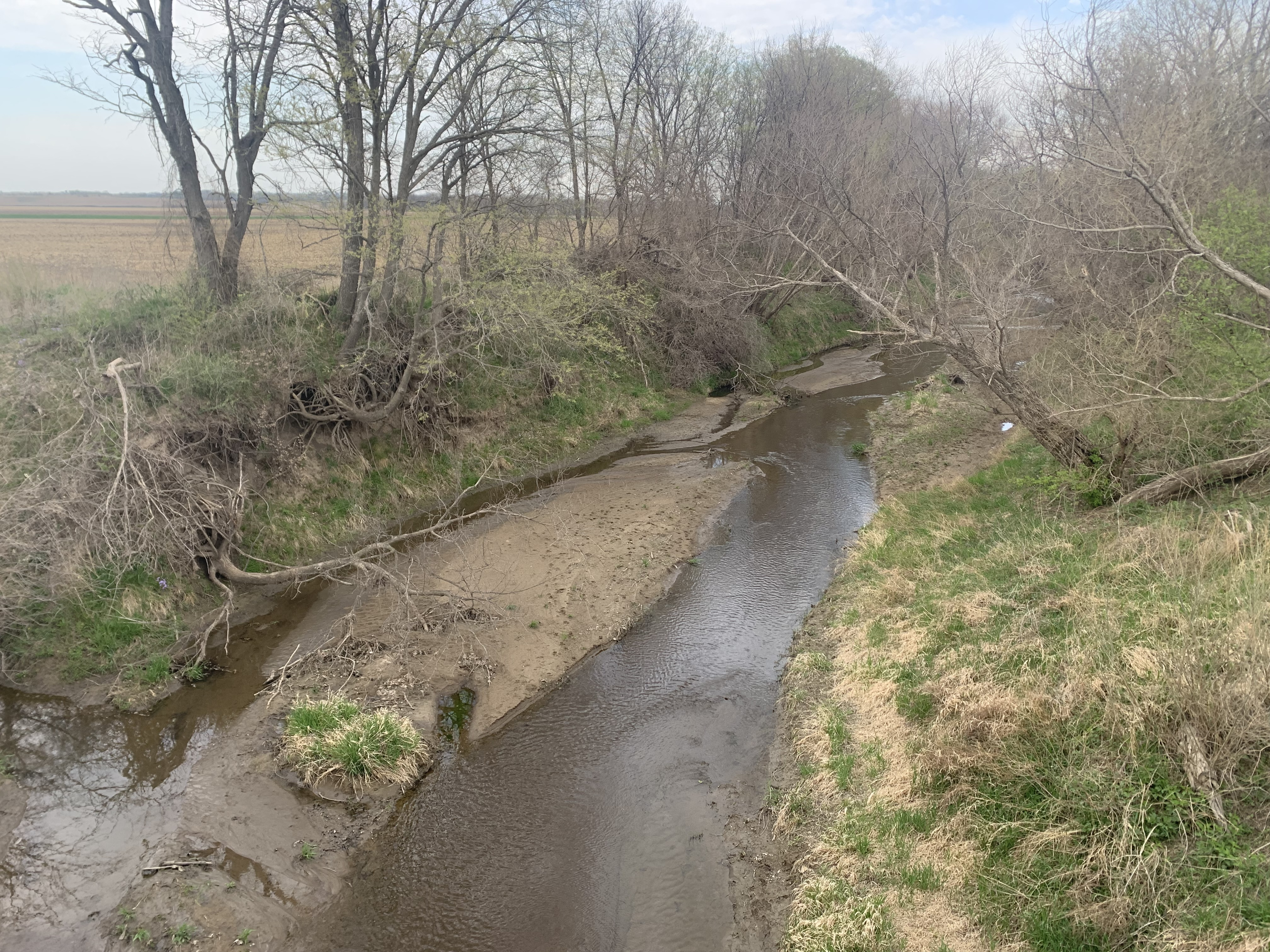
- Buchanan Creek on Teak Avenue bridge northeast of Braddyville

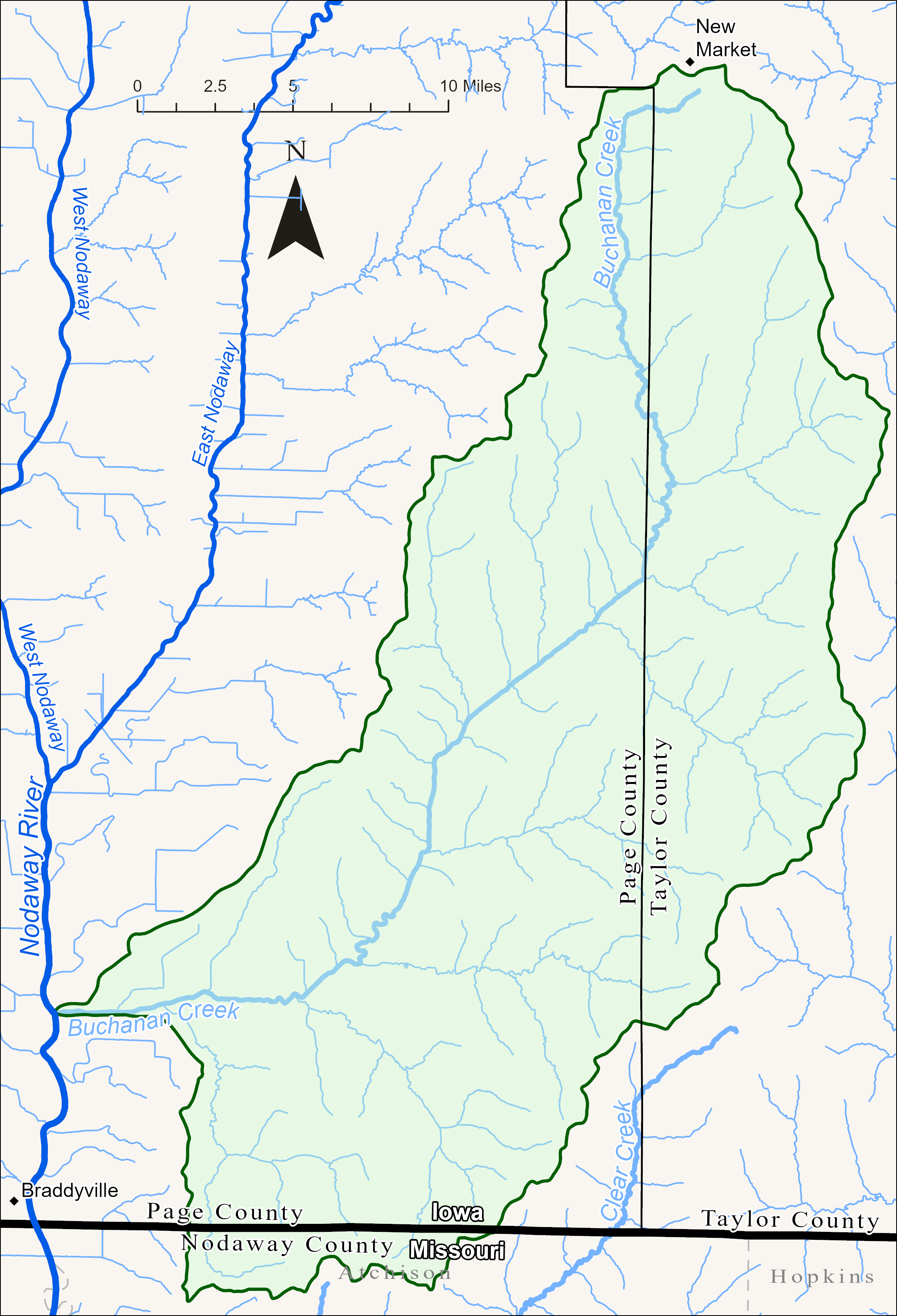
- Watershed map of Buchanan Creek

Location
- Country: United States
- State: Iowa
- County: Page and Taylor

Physical characteristics
- Source
  - location: Mason Township
  - coordinates: 40°43′37″N 94°54′19″W
  - elevation: 1,100 ft (340 m)
- Mouth: Nodaway River
  - location: Buchanan Township
  - coordinates: 40°36′17″N 95°01′05″W
  - elevation: 942 ft (287 m)
- Length: 14.4 mi (23.2 km)
- Basin size: 40.42 sq mi (104.7 km^{2})
- Width
  - average: 25ft

Basin features
- Progression: Buchanan Creek → Nodaway River → Missouri River → Mississippi River → Atlantic Ocean
- Stream gradient 14.4 ft/mi (2.73 m/km)

Buchanan Creek is a stream in southeastern Page County western Taylor County in the U.S. state of Iowa. It is a tributary of the Nodaway River and is 14.4 miles long.

== Etymology ==
Buchanan Creek was ostensibly named in memory of an army officer who, in 1833, drowned in the creek while crossing it.

== Geography ==
Buchanan Creek is a left tributary of the Nodaway River and joins it 2.2 miles after its source at the confluence of the East Nodaway and West Nodaway rivers. It is the first named tributary of the Nodaway River proper and the only such one in Iowa. A small portion of its watershed stretches south in Missouri.

=== Course ===
Buchanan Creek sources just south of New Market near Iowa 2 and travels southerly along the Page-Taylor county boundary for about 4 miles. It then turns into Page County and travels southwesterly for 5 miles, passing Ross Park to the north. Lastly, it turns west and continues for about 2 miles before its confluence with the Nodaway River almost 2 miles north of Braddyville.

=== Crossings ===
One Highway crosses Buchanan Creek, County Road J53 in Page County, Iowa.

== See also ==
- Buchanan Township, Page County, Iowa
- Tributaries of the Nodaway River
- List of rivers of Iowa
