= Nodaway Township =

Nodaway Township may refer to:

- Nodaway Township, Adams County, Iowa
- Nodaway Township, Page County, Iowa
- Nodaway Township, Taylor County, Iowa
- Nodaway Township, Andrew County, Missouri
- Nodaway Township, Holt County, Missouri
- Nodaway Township, Nodaway County, Missouri

All the aforementioned townships lie along the Nodaway River.
