= Siam, Iowa =

Unincorporated community in Iowa, U.S.

- Unincorporated community
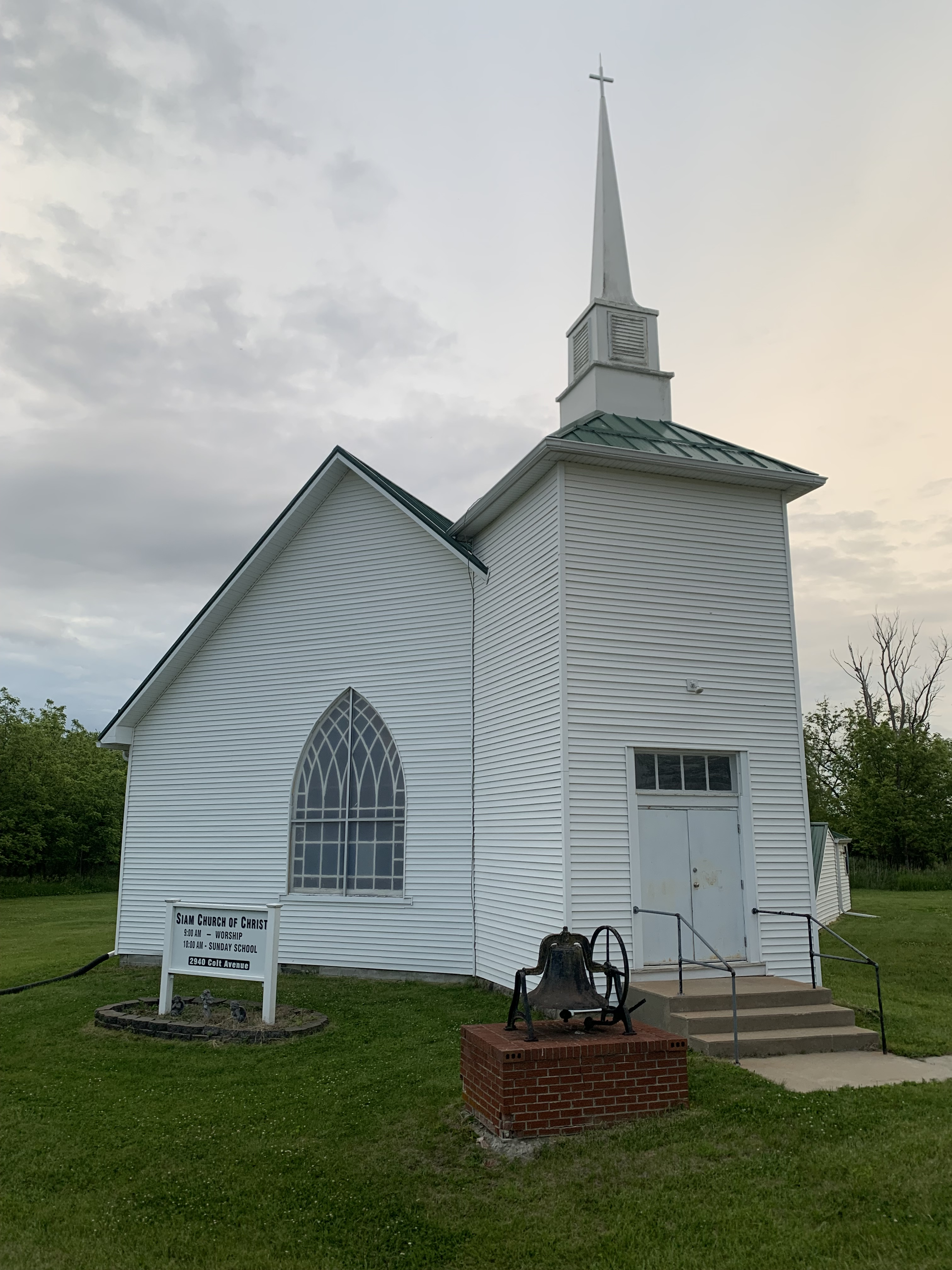
- Siam Church of Christ in Siam, Iowa
- Interactive map of Siam, Iowa
- Coordinates: 40°37′35″N 94°53′07″W
- Country: United States
- State: Iowa
- County: Taylor
- Township: Polk
- Elevation: 1,198 ft (365 m)
- Time zone: UTC-6 (Central (CST))
  - Summer (DST): UTC-5 (CDT)
- ZIP code: 50833
- GNIS feature ID: 461595

Siam is an unincorporated community in Polk Township, Taylor County, Iowa, and was the township's first settlement. It is not known where the name Siam came from.

== History ==
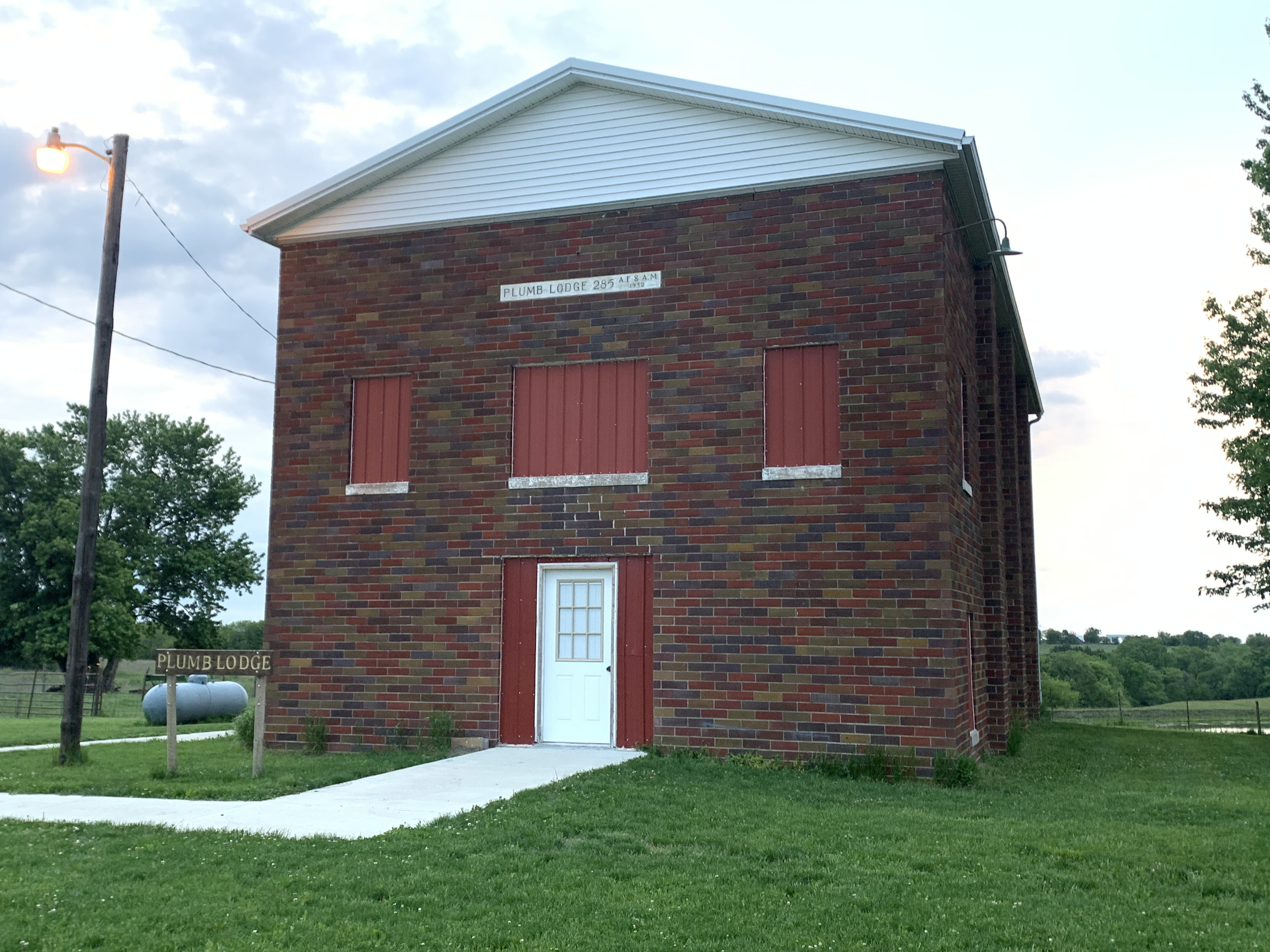
Plumb Lodge in Siam, Iowa

Siam's original name was Buchanan, for President James Buchanan, and was platted in 1856. A post office was established in 1860, but because Buchanan had already taken the name Siam was used, the post office continued until either 1903 or 1906. The town of Siam never received a railroad and did not grow to the size its founders anticipated, yet it thrived in the 1860s and 1870s.

Siam's original school was a log two-story house from 1858 to 1889, with the advanced grades above and the lower grades below. A two-room school was erected in 1889 and was used until 1961, when the New Market Community School District consolidated with the Siam school. Telephone lines were installed in 1903, and electricity arrived in 1948. In 1989, the community still had a community hall, a masonic temple, a couple of businesses, and a church.

The population was 40 in 1940. The population in 1989 was roughly 15. Today, only the church remains and shares a minister with a church in New Market.

=== Murder mystery ===
There is a folktale of a murder and missing treasure around Siam, relating a man traveling through the area circa 1870, carrying $90,000, being murdered, possibly by Frank and Jesse James, and the body and money being buried. Decades later, in 1915, four old men in Bedford, Iowa were arrested for the robbery and murder, however, no evidence of the crime or the treasure has ever been found, though many have searched.

== Geography ==
Siam is located at the intersection of County Highways N26 and J53, about 7 miles south of New Market and 3.5 miles north of the Iowa-Missouri border. Siam is located on the drainage divide between the Nodaway River and One Hundred and Two River. Just southwest of Siam there is a 117-acre natural area named Siam Tract operated by Taylor County. The Siam Cemetery is a large cemetery east of town with over 900 graves.

== Education ==
Siam is part of the Bedford Community School District based out of Bedford, Iowa.

== Miscellaneous ==
Many auctioneers and preachers have their origins in Siam.
