= Lenox, Iowa =

- City
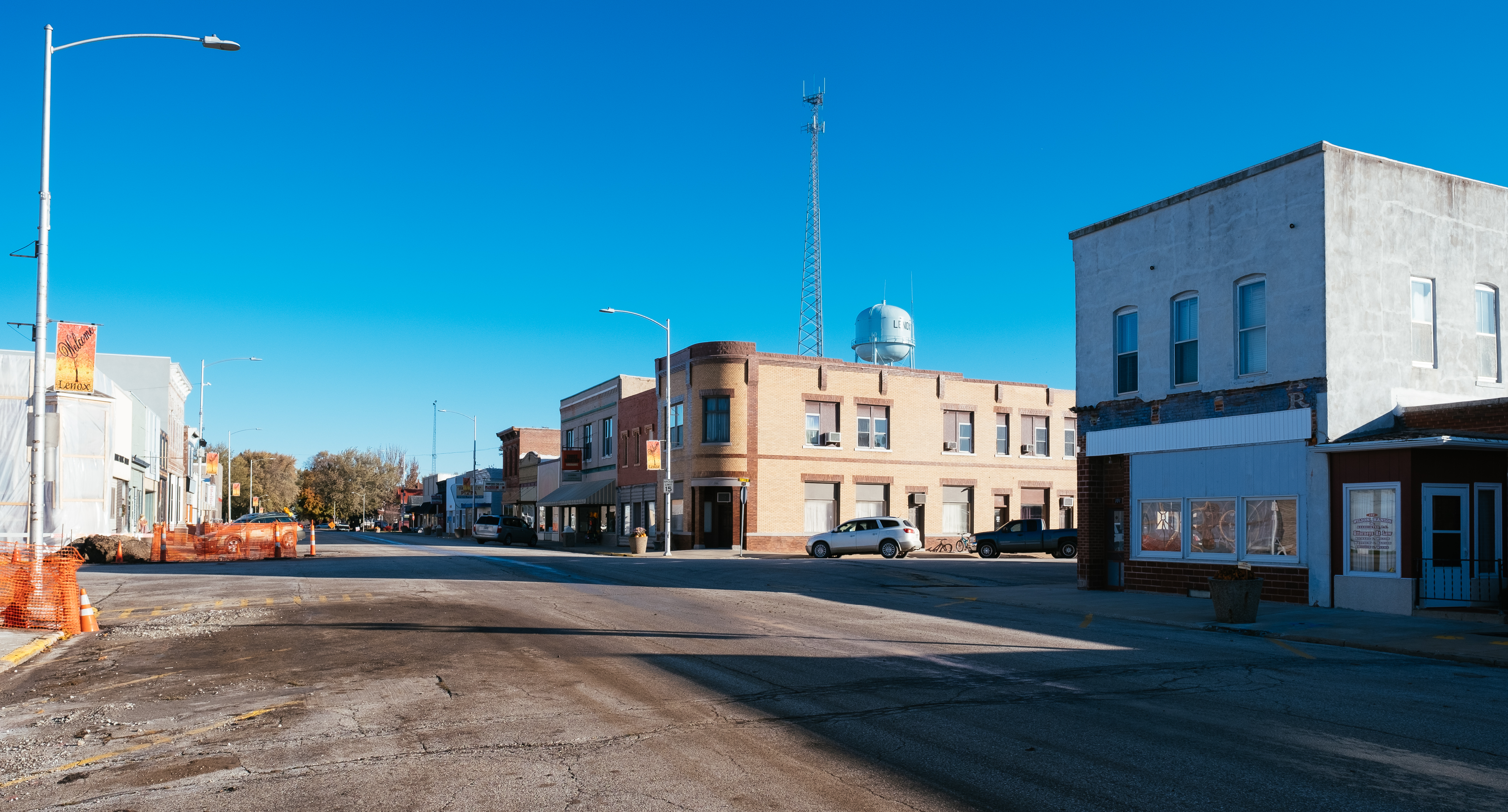
- Main Street

- Logo

- Location of Lenox, Iowa
- Coordinates: 40°52′40″N 94°33′27″W
- Country: United States
- State: Iowa
- Counties: Taylor and Adams
- Townships: Platte (Taylor County), Grant (Adams County)
- Established: 1871
- Incorporated: July 2, 1875

Area
  - Total: 1.98 sq mi (5.13 km^{2})
  - Land: 1.90 sq mi (4.92 km^{2})
  - Water: 0.081 sq mi (0.21 km^{2})
- Elevation: 1,303 ft (397 m)

Population (2020)
  - Total: 1,339
  - Density: 704.7/sq mi (272.08/km^{2})
- Time zone: UTC-6 (Central (CST))
  - Summer (DST): UTC-5 (CDT)
- ZIP code: 50851
- Area code: 641
- FIPS code: 19-44490
- GNIS feature ID: 2395678
- Website: lenoxia.com

Lenox is a city in Taylor and Adams counties in the U.S. state of Iowa. The population was 1,339 at the time of the 2020 census.

== History ==
Lenox was established in 1872, following construction of the Chicago, Burlington and Quincy Railroad through the territory. The settlement was incorporated on July 2, 1875.

According to The Des Moines Register, residents of Lenox and nearby New Market in Taylor County recall sundown town ordinances to restrict the presence of people of color. Helen Janson, Taylor County Historical Society president, stated, "Lenox was violently opposed to blacks. It was well-known."

== Geography ==
According to the United States Census Bureau, the city has a total area of 2.06 square miles (5.34 km^{2}), of which 1.98 square miles (5.13 km^{2}) is land and 0.08 square miles (0.21 km^{2}) is water.

== Demographics ==
Historical populations
Year	Pop.	±%
1880	615	—
1890	706	+14.8%
1900	1,014	+43.6%
1910	1,274	+25.6%
1920	1,197	−6.0%
1930	1,171	−2.2%
1940	1,220	+4.2%
1950	1,171	−4.0%
1960	1,178	+0.6%
1970	1,215	+3.1%
1980	1,338	+10.1%
1990	1,303	−2.6%
2000	1,401	+7.5%
2010	1,407	+0.4%
2020	1,339	−4.8%
Source:"U.S. Census website". United States Census Bureau. and Iowa Data Center; Source: U.S. Decennial Census

=== 2020 census ===
As of the 2020 census, there were 1,339 people, 563 households, and 351 families residing in the city. The population density was 704.7 inhabitants per square mile (272.1/km^{2}). There were 638 housing units at an average density of 335.8 per square mile (129.6/km^{2}).

The median age was 39.3 years. 26.6% of residents were under the age of 18 and 23.9% were 65 years of age or older. 28.7% of residents were under the age of 20; 4.1% were between the ages of 20 and 24; 22.4% were from 25 to 44; and 20.9% were from 45 to 64. For every 100 females there were 97.8 males, and for every 100 females age 18 and over there were 89.4 males age 18 and over. The gender makeup of the city was 49.4% male and 50.6% female.

There were 563 households, of which 31.4% had children under the age of 18 living with them. Of all households, 44.4% were married-couple households, 6.4% were cohabitating couples, 31.6% had a female householder with no spouse or partner present, and 17.6% had a male householder with no spouse or partner present. 37.7% of all households were non-families. 33.6% of all households were made up of individuals, and 21.8% had someone living alone who was 65 years of age or older.

There were 638 housing units, of which 11.8% were vacant. The homeowner vacancy rate was 3.1% and the rental vacancy rate was 10.4%.

0.0% of residents lived in urban areas, while 100.0% lived in rural areas.

Racial composition as of the 2020 census
Race	Number	Percent
White	1,070	79.9%
Black or African American	1	0.1%
American Indian and Alaska Native	1	0.1%
Asian	1	0.1%
Native Hawaiian and Other Pacific Islander	2	0.1%
Some other race	153	11.4%
Two or more races	111	8.3%
Hispanic or Latino (of any race)	341	25.5%

=== 2010 census ===
As of the census of 2010, there were 1,407 people, 609 households, and 344 families living in the city. The population density was 710.6 inhabitants per square mile (274.4/km^{2}). There were 664 housing units at an average density of 335.4 per square mile (129.5/km^{2}). The racial makeup of the city was 91.3% White, 0.4% African American, 0.4% Asian, 7.0% from other races, and 0.9% from two or more races. Hispanic or Latino of any race were 19.8% of the population.

There were 609 households, of which 26.4% had children under the age of 18 living with them, 43.3% were married couples living together, 8.4% had a female householder with no husband present, 4.8% had a male householder with no wife present, and 43.5% were non-families. 36.8% of all households were made up of individuals, and 20.5% had someone living alone who was 65 years of age or older. The average household size was 2.26 and the average family size was 3.01.

The median age in the city was 42 years. 24% of residents were under the age of 18; 7.4% were between the ages of 18 and 24; 20.9% were from 25 to 44; 25.7% were from 45 to 64; and 22% were 65 years of age or older. The gender makeup of the city was 48.8% male and 51.2% female.

=== 2000 census ===
As of the census of 2000, there were 1,402 people, 559 households, and 335 families living in the city. The population density was 709.0 inhabitants per square mile (273.7/km^{2}). There were 623 housing units at an average density of 315.3 per square mile (121.7/km^{2}). The racial makeup of the city was 94.79% White, 0.71% Asian, 3.28% from other races, and 1.21% from two or more races. Hispanic or Latino of any race were 14.28% of the population.

There were 559 households, out of which 24.3% had children under the age of 18 living with them, 51.9% were married couples living together, 4.8% had a female householder with no husband present, and 39.9% were non-families. 34.3% of all households were made up of individuals, and 18.4% had someone living alone who was 65 years of age or older. The average household size was 2.33 and the average family size was 3.02.

Age spread: 22.1% under the age of 18, 8.8% from 18 to 24, 21.8% from 25 to 44, 23.1% from 45 to 64, and 24.1% who were 65 years of age or older. The median age was 43 years. For every 100 females there were 93.2 males. For every 100 females age 18 and over, there were 89.4 males.

The median income for a household in the city was $29,958, and the median income for a family was $37,917. Males had a median income of $26,938 versus $18,125 for females. The per capita income for the city was $14,299. About 5.2% of families and 14.2% of the population were below the poverty line, including 11.4% of those under age 18 and 22.8% of those age 65 or over.

== Education ==
Lenox is a part of the Lenox Community School District.

== Sports ==
Lenox is home to the Lenox Rodeo, held annually by the Lenox Stock and Saddle Club.

== Notable people ==
- Spencer Brown, offensive tackle for the Buffalo Bills
- Rod Cless, jazz musician, born in Lenox
- George R. Lunn, former US Congressman and Lt. Governor of New York

== See also ==
- List of sundown towns in the United States
