= Spencer Brown (offensive tackle) =

American football player (born 1998)

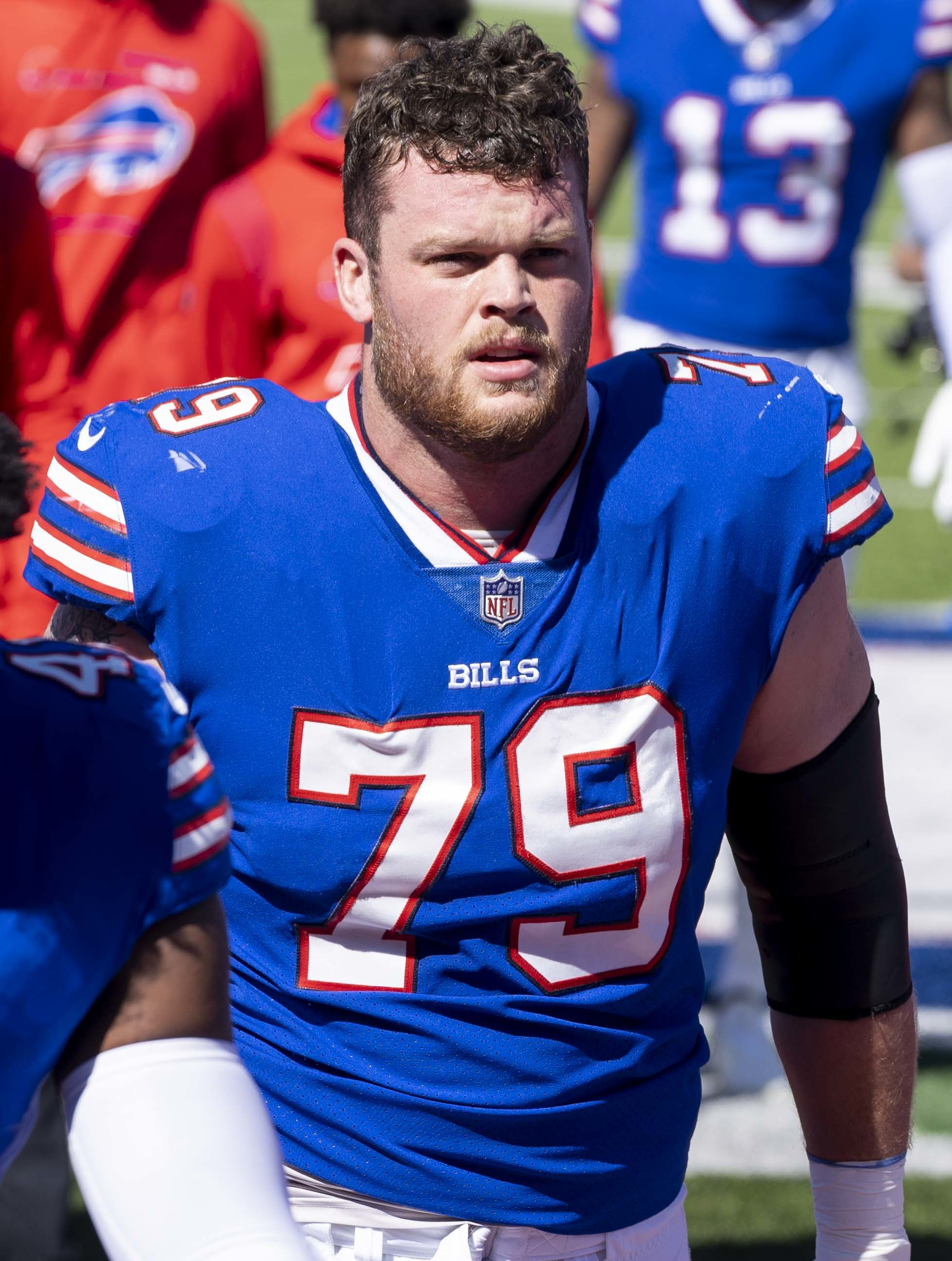
- Brown with the Buffalo Bills in 2021

No. 79 – Buffalo Bills
- Position: Offensive tackle
- Roster status: Active

Personal information
- Born: February 28, 1998 (age 28); Lenox, Iowa, U.S.
- Listed height: 6 ft 8 in (2.03 m)
- Listed weight: 311 lb (141 kg)

Career information
- High school: Lenox (IA)
- College: Northern Iowa (2016–2020)
- NFL draft: 2021: 3rd round, 93rd overall pick

Career history
- Buffalo Bills (2021–present)

Awards and highlights
- Second-team All-MVFC (2019)

Career NFL statistics as of Week 5, 2026
- Games played: 78
- Games started: 74
- Fumble recoveries: 5
- Stats at Pro Football Reference

Spencer Brown (born February 28, 1998) is an American professional football offensive tackle for the Buffalo Bills of the National Football League (NFL). He played college football for the Northern Iowa Panthers.

== Early life ==
Brown grew up in Lenox, Iowa and attended Lenox High School, where he played baseball, basketball, golf and ran track in addition to being a member of the school's eight-man football team as a defensive end and tight end. He was named first team All-State as a senior after recording 24 receptions for 388 yards and seven touchdowns on offense and 67 tackles, a state-leading 17 sacks and four fumble recoveries on defense.

== College career ==
Brown redshirted his true freshman season at the University of Northern Iowa as he moved from tight end to offensive tackle and gained nearly 80 pounds (36 kg). Brown started the first five games of his redshirt freshman season before suffering a season-ending knee injury. As a redshirt junior, Brown started all of the Panthers' games and was named second team All-Missouri Valley Football Conference. Brown was named a preseason first team FCS All-American by Phil Steele before announcing that he would forgo his redshirt senior season, which was to be played in the spring due to COVID-19, and prepare for the 2021 NFL Draft.

== Professional career ==
Pre-draft measurables
Height	Weight	Arm length	Hand span	Wingspan	40-yard dash	10-yard split	20-yard split	20-yard shuttle	Three-cone drill	Vertical jump	Broad jump	Bench press
6 ft 8 1/4 in (2.04 m)	311 lb (141 kg)	34 3/4 in (0.88 m)	10 1/4 in (0.26 m)	6 ft 10 5/8 in (2.10 m)	4.94 s	1.69 s	2.83 s	4.40 s	6.96 s	31.5 in (0.80 m)	9 ft 9 in (2.97 m)	29 reps
All values from Northern Iowa Pro Day

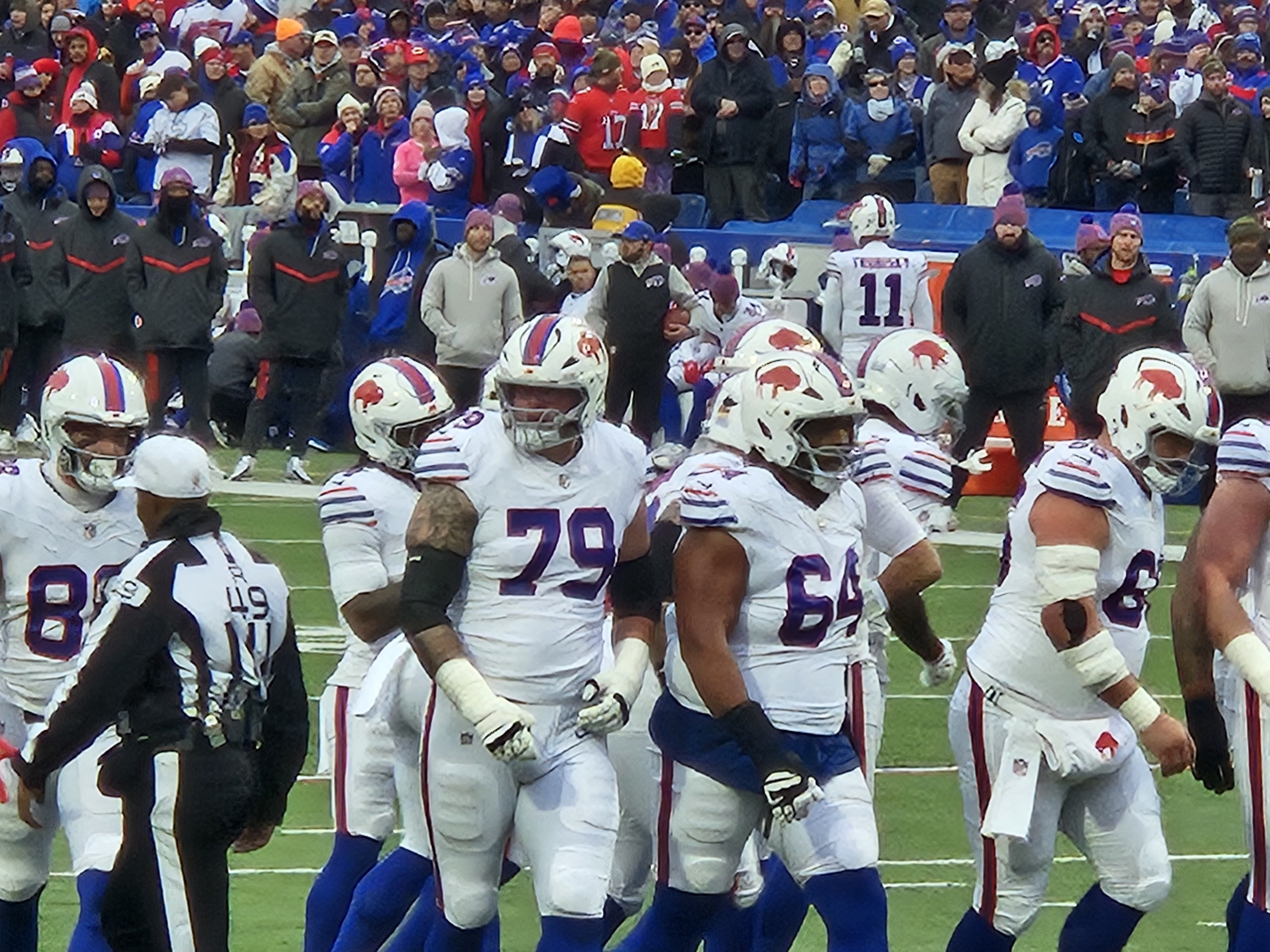
Brown (#79) and the Bills' offensive line against the Tampa Bay Buccaneers in 2025

Brown was selected by the Buffalo Bills in the third round with the 93rd overall pick of the 2021 NFL draft on April 30, 2021. On July 20, Brown signed his four-year rookie contract with Buffalo. On October 3, 2021, Brown was promoted in the lineup to right tackle for his first career start.

Following two inconsistent, injury-prone seasons in which he never started more than 14 games, Brown started in all 17 games in the 2023 season, earning the third highest play-based pay incentive in the league for his improved play.

On September 6, 2024, Brown signed a four-year contract extension with the Bills, keeping him under contract through the 2028 season.
