= Clearfield School District =

Clearfield School District may refer to:

- Clearfield Area School District - Pennsylvania
- Clearfield Community School District - Iowa (defunct)
