= John Alexander Buchanan =

Canadian politician

Canadian Senator from Alberta
- In office January 15, 1959 – October 2, 1965

Personal details
- Born: March 4, 1887 Comber, Ontario, Canada
- Died: May 9, 1976 (aged 89) Edmonton, Alberta, Canada
- Party: Progressive Conservative
- Education: University of Toronto
- Occupation: Politician; engineer

John Alexander Buchanan (March 4, 1887 – May 9, 1976) was a Canadian politician and civil engineer.

== Background ==
Buchanan was appointed to the Senate of Canada on January 15, 1959 on the advice of John Diefenbaker. He retired from the Senate on October 2, 1965.

Bear Creek a tributary flowing into the Peace River was formally renamed Buchanan Creek in his honor.

His stepson, Robert George Mason was the father of Brian Mason, leader of the Alberta New Democratic Party from 2004 to 2014.
