= Clayton Township, Taylor County, Iowa =

Township in Taylor County, Iowa, U.S.

Coordinates: 40.6835°N 94.6367°W

Clayton Township is a township in Taylor County, Iowa, United States.

== History ==
Clayton Township was established in 1858.
