= Washington Township, Taylor County, Iowa =

Township in Taylor County, Iowa, U.S.

Coordinates: 40.770°N 94.757°W

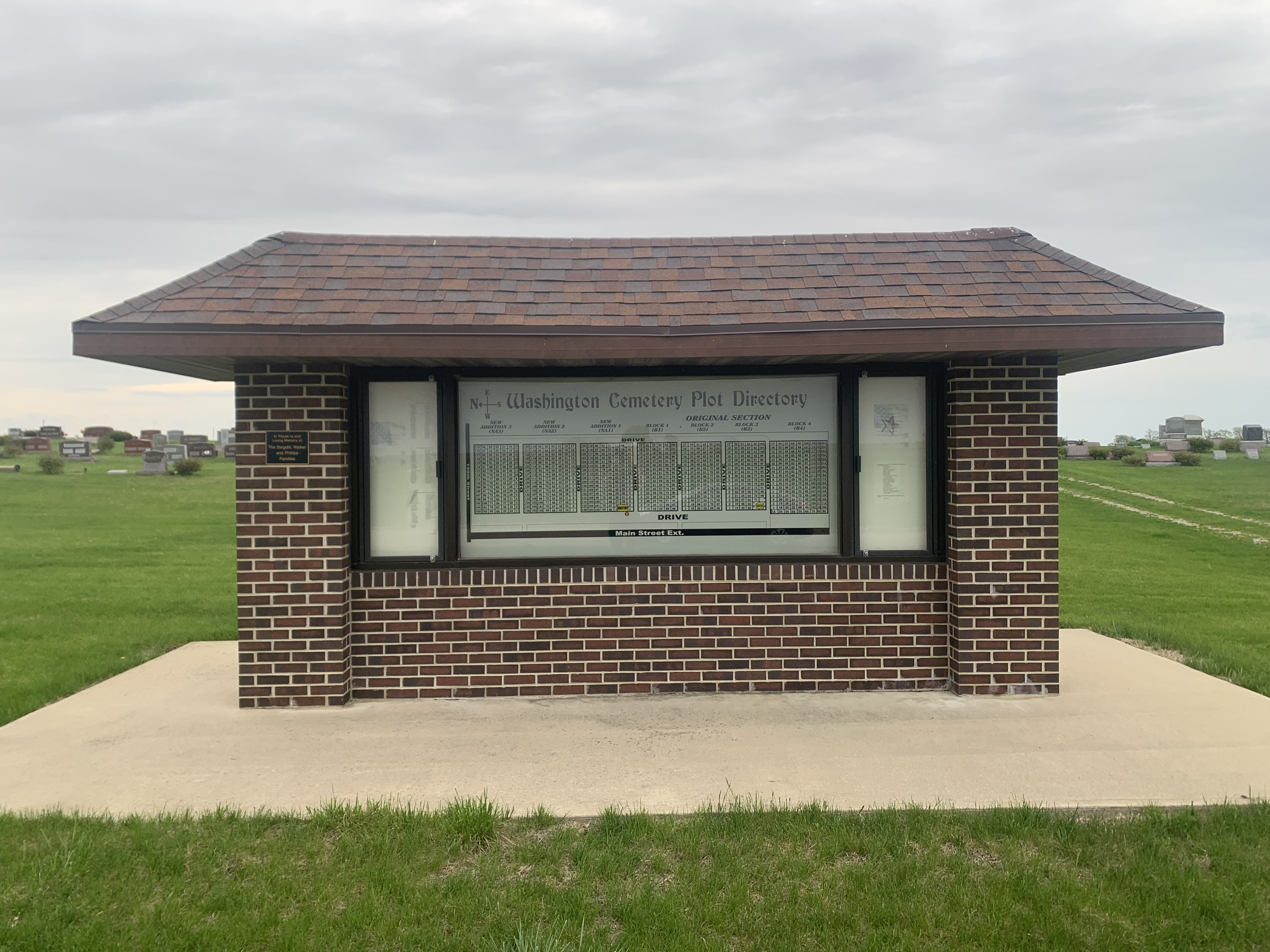
Washington Cemetery north of Gravity, Iowa

Washington Township is a township in Taylor County, Iowa, United States.

== History ==
Washington Township was established in 1855.
