= Dallas Township, Taylor County, Iowa =

Township in Taylor County, Iowa, U.S.

Coordinates: 40.77°N 94.87°W

Dallas Township is a township in Taylor County, Iowa, United States.

== History ==
Dallas Township was established in 1858.
