= Rod Cless =

- Birth name: Rod Cless
- Born: May 20, 1907; Lenox, Iowa, U.S.
- Died: December 8, 1944 (aged 37); New York, U.S.
- Genres: Jazz
- Instrument(s): Saxophone, clarinet
- Formerly of: Art Hodes; Muggsy Spanier

George Roderick Cless (May 20, 1907, in Lenox, Iowa – December 8, 1944, in New York City) was an American jazz clarinetist and saxophonist, perhaps best known for his work on sixteen Muggsy Spanier tunes for Bluebird Records. Additionally, Cless worked with other artists such as Frank Teschemacher, Gene Krupa, Art Hodes, Bobby Hackett, Max Kaminsky and Mezz Mezzrow.

== Death ==
Walking home from the last night of a job at the Pied Piper (where he played alongside his friend Max Kaminsky) in December 1944, Cless fell over the balcony of his apartment building and died four days later at the age of 37.

== Select discography ==
With Art Hodes

- Sittin' In (Blue Note)
- The Funky Piano Of Art Hodes (Blue Note)
- Art Hodes And His Chicagoans, The Best In 2 Beat (Blue Note)
- The Complete Art Hodes Blue Note Sessions (Blue Note)

With Muggsy Spanier

- Relaxin' at the Touro (Bluebird)
- At the Jazz Band Ball:Chicago/New York Dixieland (Bluebird)
- The Great 16!, (originally recorded on Bluebird and reissued by RCA Victor Jazz Classics)

With the Rod Cless Quartet

- "Froggy Moore" b/w "Have You Ever Felt That Way" - Black & White Records 29 A (BW 33)/29 B (BW 36)
