= Holt Township, Taylor County, Iowa =

Township in Taylor County, Iowa, U.S.

Coordinates: 40.857°N 94.758°W

Holt Township is a township in Taylor County, Iowa, United States.

== History ==
Holt Township is believed to be named for its first clerk. A hamlet called Holt existed in this township but nothing remains of it today.
