= Clearfield, Iowa =

City in Iowa, United States

- City
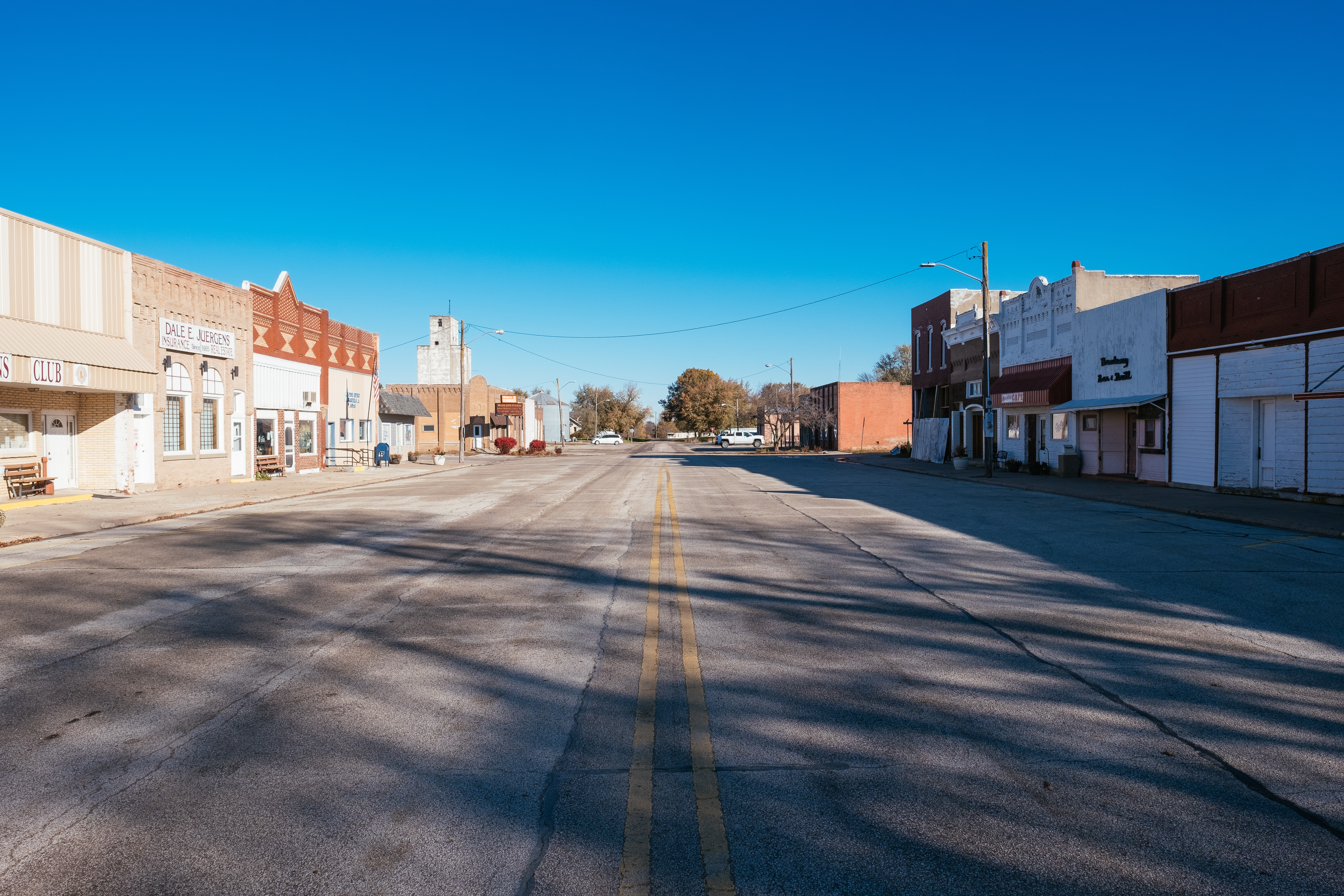
- Broadway Street

- Location of Clearfield, Iowa
- Coordinates: 40°48′0″N 94°29′35″W
- Country: USA
- State: Iowa
- Counties: Taylor, Ringgold

Area
  - Total: 1.19 sq mi (3.08 km^{2})
  - Land: 1.19 sq mi (3.08 km^{2})
  - Water: 0 sq mi (0.00 km^{2})
- Elevation: 1,253 ft (382 m)

Population (2020)
  - Total: 278
  - Density: 233.7/sq mi (90.23/km^{2})
- Time zone: UTC-6 (Central (CST))
  - Summer (DST): UTC-5 (CDT)
- ZIP code: 50840
- Area code: 641
- FIPS code: 19-13980
- GNIS feature ID: 2393552

Clearfield is a city in Taylor and Ringgold counties in the U.S. state of Iowa. The population was 278 at the time of the 2020 census.

== History ==
Clearfield was platted in 1881 when the Humeston and Shenandoah Railroad was being built through that territory. The town was incorporated in 1882.

== Geography ==
According to the United States Census Bureau, the city has a total area of 1.26 square miles (3.26 km^{2}), all land.

== Demographics ==
Historical populations
Year	Pop.	±%
1890	452	—
1900	698	+54.4%
1910	625	−10.5%
1920	665	+6.4%
1930	607	−8.7%
1940	615	+1.3%
1950	547	−11.1%
1960	504	−7.9%
1970	430	−14.7%
1980	433	+0.7%
1990	417	−3.7%
2000	371	−11.0%
2010	363	−2.2%
2020	278	−23.4%
Source:"U.S. Census website". United States Census Bureau. and Iowa Data Center; Source: U.S. Decennial Census

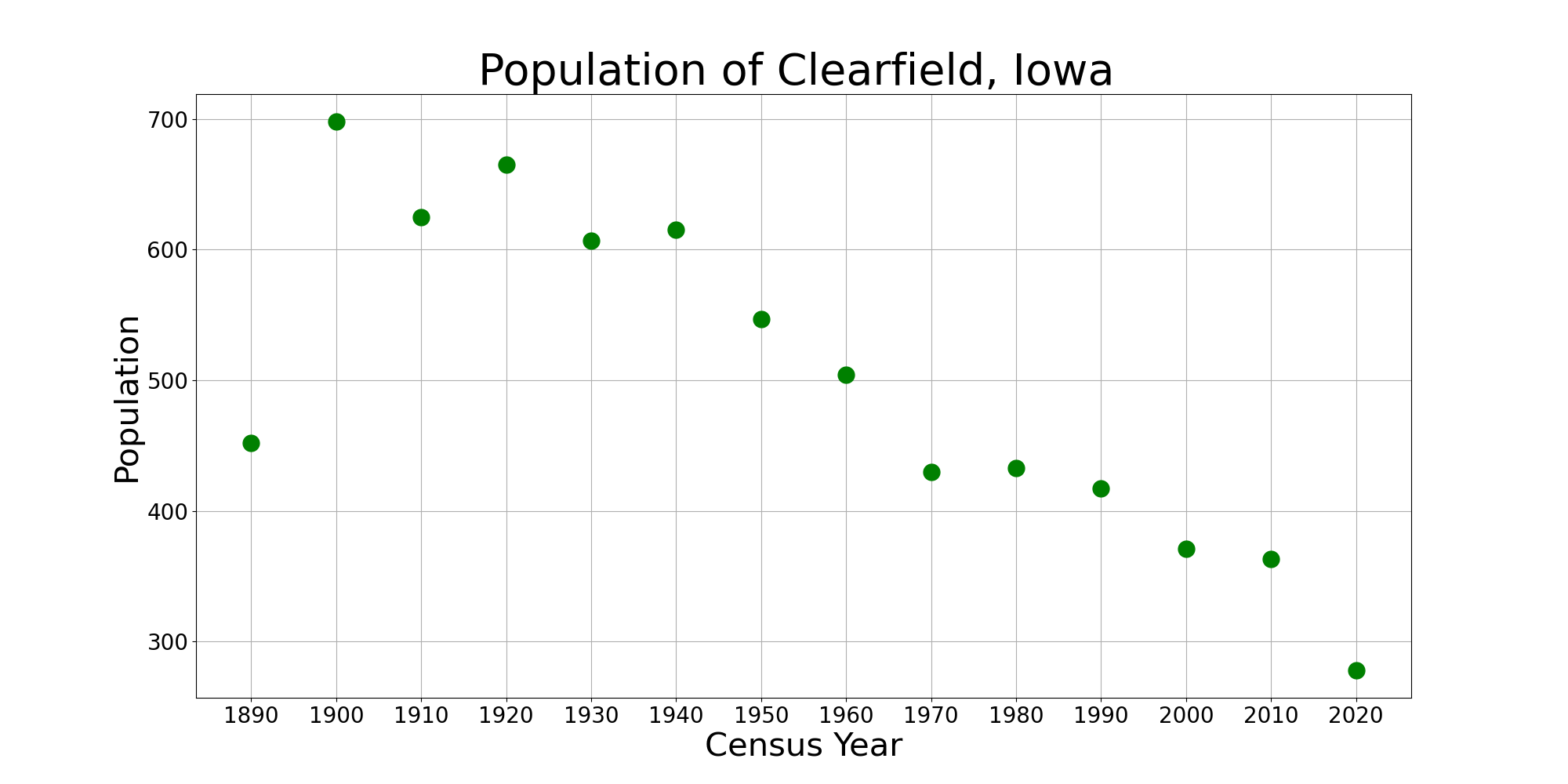
The population of Clearfield, Iowa from US census data

=== 2020 census ===
As of the census of 2020, there were 278 people, 136 households, and 76 families residing in the city. The population density was 233.7 inhabitants per square mile (90.2/km^{2}). There were 167 housing units at an average density of 140.4 per square mile (54.2/km^{2}). The racial makeup of the city was 95.3% White, 0.0% Black or African American, 0.0% Native American, 0.0% Asian, 0.0% Pacific Islander, 1.4% from other races and 3.2% from two or more races. Hispanic or Latino persons of any race comprised 3.6% of the population.

Of the 136 households, 29.4% of which had children under the age of 18 living with them, 36.8% were married couples living together, 12.5% were cohabitating couples, 29.4% had a female householder with no spouse or partner present and 21.3% had a male householder with no spouse or partner present. 44.1% of all households were non-families. 35.3% of all households were made up of individuals, 19.1% had someone living alone who was 65 years old or older.

The median age in the city was 42.0 years. 25.2% of the residents were under the age of 20; 4.0% were between the ages of 20 and 24; 22.3% were from 25 and 44; 20.1% were from 45 and 64; and 28.4% were 65 years of age or older. The gender makeup of the city was 47.8% male and 52.2% female.

=== 2010 census ===
As of the census of 2010, there were 363 people, 153 households, and 87 families living in the city. The population density was 288.1 inhabitants per square mile (111.2/km^{2}). There were 178 housing units at an average density of 141.3 per square mile (54.6/km^{2}). The racial makeup of the city was 97.8% White, 0.6% African American, 0.3% Native American, and 1.4% from two or more races. Hispanic or Latino of any race were 1.7% of the population.

There were 153 households, of which 22.2% had children under the age of 18 living with them, 43.8% were married couples living together, 7.8% had a female householder with no husband present, 5.2% had a male householder with no wife present, and 43.1% were non-families. 35.9% of all households were made up of individuals, and 21.5% had someone living alone who was 65 years of age or older. The average household size was 2.17 and the average family size was 2.78.

The median age in the city was 50.7 years. 22% of residents were under the age of 18; 4% were between the ages of 18 and 24; 18.7% were from 25 to 44; 25.1% were from 45 to 64; and 30.3% were 65 years of age or older. The gender makeup of the city was 46.8% male and 53.2% female.

=== 2000 census ===
As of the census of 2000, there were 371 people, 163 households, and 93 families living in the city. The population density was 459.2 inhabitants per square mile (177.3/km^{2}). There were 184 housing units at an average density of 227.7 per square mile (87.9/km^{2}). The racial makeup of the city was 98.65% White, and 1.35% from two or more races. Hispanic or Latino of any race were 1.62% of the population.

There were 163 households, out of which 20.2% had children under the age of 18 living with them, 49.7% were married couples living together, 5.5% had a female householder with no husband present, and 42.9% were non-families. 39.3% of all households were made up of individuals, and 27.6% had someone living alone who was 65 years of age or older. The average household size was 2.05 and the average family size was 2.75.

In the city, the population was spread out, with 16.4% under the age of 18, 8.1% from 18 to 24, 15.9% from 25 to 44, 25.3% from 45 to 64, and 34.2% who were 65 years of age or older. The median age was 52 years. For every 100 females, there were 75.0 males. For every 100 females age 18 and over, there were 73.2 males.

The median income for a household in the city was $23,203, and the median income for a family was $35,125. Males had a median income of $26,346 versus $17,143 for females. The per capita income for the city was $13,810. About 6.2% of families and 10.7% of the population were below the poverty line, including none of those under age 18 and 16.3% of those age 65 or over.

== Education ==
Much of the city a part of the Lenox Community School District, while a portion is in the Mount Ayr Community School District. Another portion is in the Diagonal Community School District.

It was in the Clearfield Community School District until 2014.
