= Grove Township, Taylor County, Iowa =

Township in Taylor County, Iowa, U.S.

Coordinates: 40.856°N 94.643°W

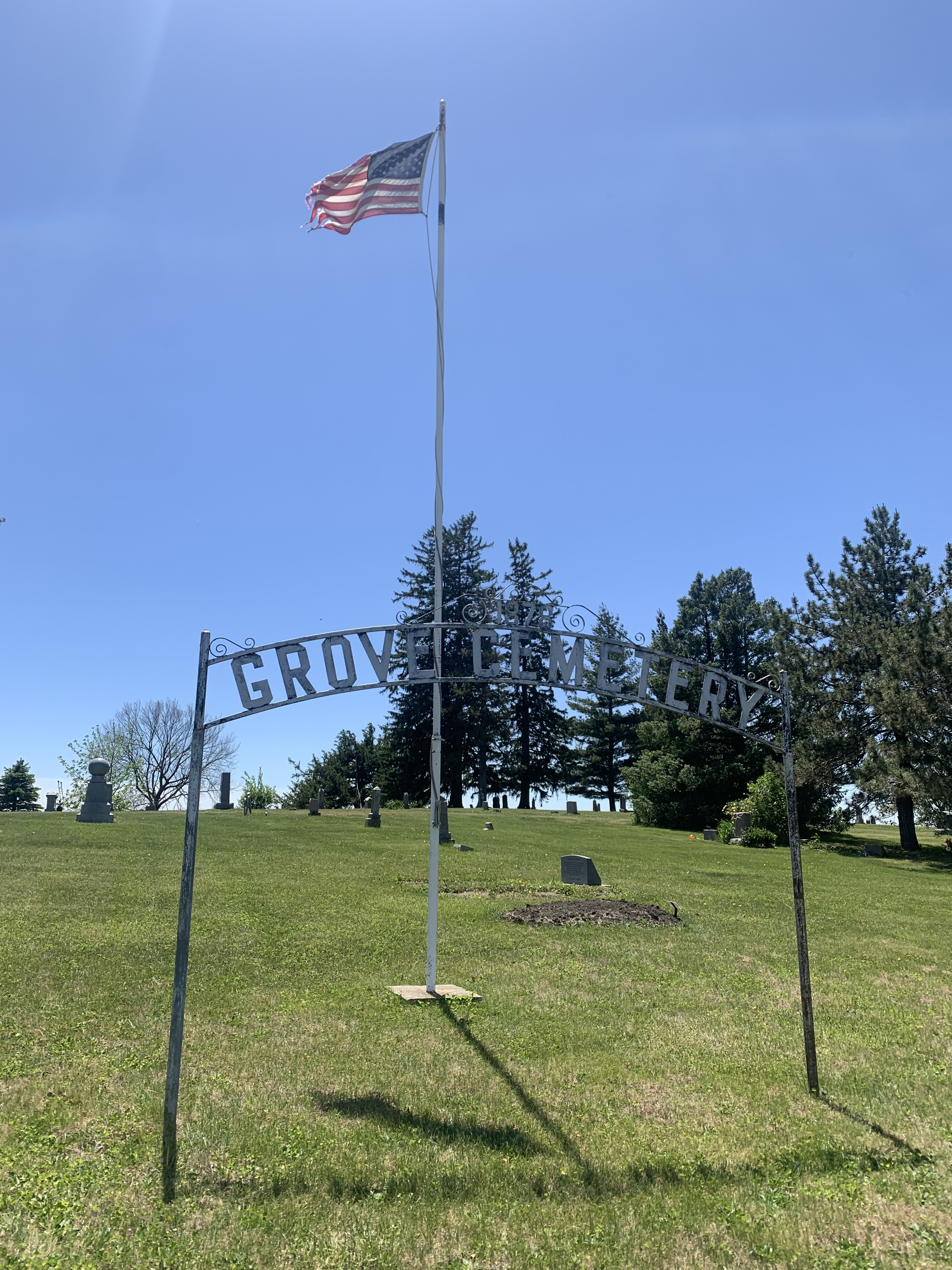
Grove Cemetery in Grove Township, Taylor County, Iowa

Grove Township is a township in Taylor County, Iowa, United States.

== History ==
Grove Township was established in 1870.
