= Diagonal Community School District =

Public school district in Diagonal, Iowa, United States

Coordinates: 40.807892°N 94.344339°W

Location
- Diagonal, Iowa Ringgold County United States
- Coordinates: 40.807892, -94.344339

District information
- Type: Local school district
- Grades: K-12
- Superintendent: Karleen Stephens
- Schools: 2
- Budget: $2,723,000 (2020-21)
- NCES District ID: 1909060

Students and staff
- Students: 130 (2022-23)
- Teachers: 13.49 FTE
- Staff: 22.46 FTE
- Student–teacher ratio: 9.64
- Athletic conference: Bluegrass
- District mascot: Maroons
- Colors: Maroon and gold

Other information
- Website: www.diagonal.k12.ia.us

Diagonal Community School District is a rural public K-12 school district headquartered in Diagonal, Iowa. The district, with the vast majority of its territory in Ringgold County, includes the town of Diagonal. A small portion is in Taylor County, where it covers a section of Clearfield.

All grade levels and the administration share the same building. As of 2018, it had the lowest enrollment of any Iowa school district: 97; the 12th grade class that year had nine students. Due to the difficult financial situation, the district uses cost-cutting measures such as using dry-erase desktops instead of paper and using the same paint color for all rooms. As of 2018 Diagonal CSD does not have enough funds to provide elective courses at the senior high school level, so its high school students take those courses at Mount Ayr High School in Mount Ayr.

== History ==
When the Clearfield Community School District closed on July 1, 2014, the Diagonal district absorbed a portion of it.

The principal, surnamed Clark, resigned in 2024.

The school's mascot is the Maroons. Their colors are maroon and gold.

== Diagonal Junior-Senior High School ==
=== Athletics ===
The Maroons compete in the Bluegrass Conference, including the following sports:

- Volleyball
- Basketball
- Track and field
- Baseball
- Softball

== See also ==
- List of school districts in Iowa
