= Jefferson Township, Taylor County, Iowa =

Township in Taylor County, Iowa, U.S.

Coordinates: 40.6053°N 94.5286°W

Jefferson Township is a township in Taylor County, Iowa, United States.

== History ==
Jefferson Township was established in 1858. It is named for Thomas Jefferson, third President of the United States.
