= Marshall Township, Taylor County, Iowa =

Township in Taylor County, Iowa, U.S.

Coordinates: 40.770°N 94.643°W

Marshall Township is a township in Taylor County, Iowa, United States.

== History ==
Marshall Township was established in 1858.
