= Ross Township, Taylor County, Iowa =

Township in Taylor County, Iowa, U.S.

Coordinates: 40.610°N 94.745°W

Ross Township is a township in Taylor County, Iowa, United States.

== History ==
Ross Township was established in 1858. It was named for James Ross, a pioneer settler.
