= Benton Township, Taylor County, Iowa =

Township in Taylor County, Iowa, U.S.

Coordinates: 40.6936°N 94.7547°W

Benton Township is a township in Taylor County, Iowa, United States.

== History ==
Benton Township was organized in 1851.
