= Grant Township, Taylor County, Iowa =

Township in Taylor County, Iowa, U.S.

Coordinates: 40.7683°N 94.5272°W

Grant Township is a township in Taylor County, Iowa, United States.

== History ==
Grant Township was established in 1869.
