= Gay Township, Taylor County, Iowa =

Township in Taylor County, Iowa, U.S.

Coordinates: 40.683°N 94.529°W

Gay Township is a township in Taylor County, Iowa, United States.

== History ==
Gay Township was established in 1869.
