= Polk Township, Taylor County, Iowa =

Township in Taylor County, Iowa, U.S.

Coordinates: 40.612°N 94.858°W

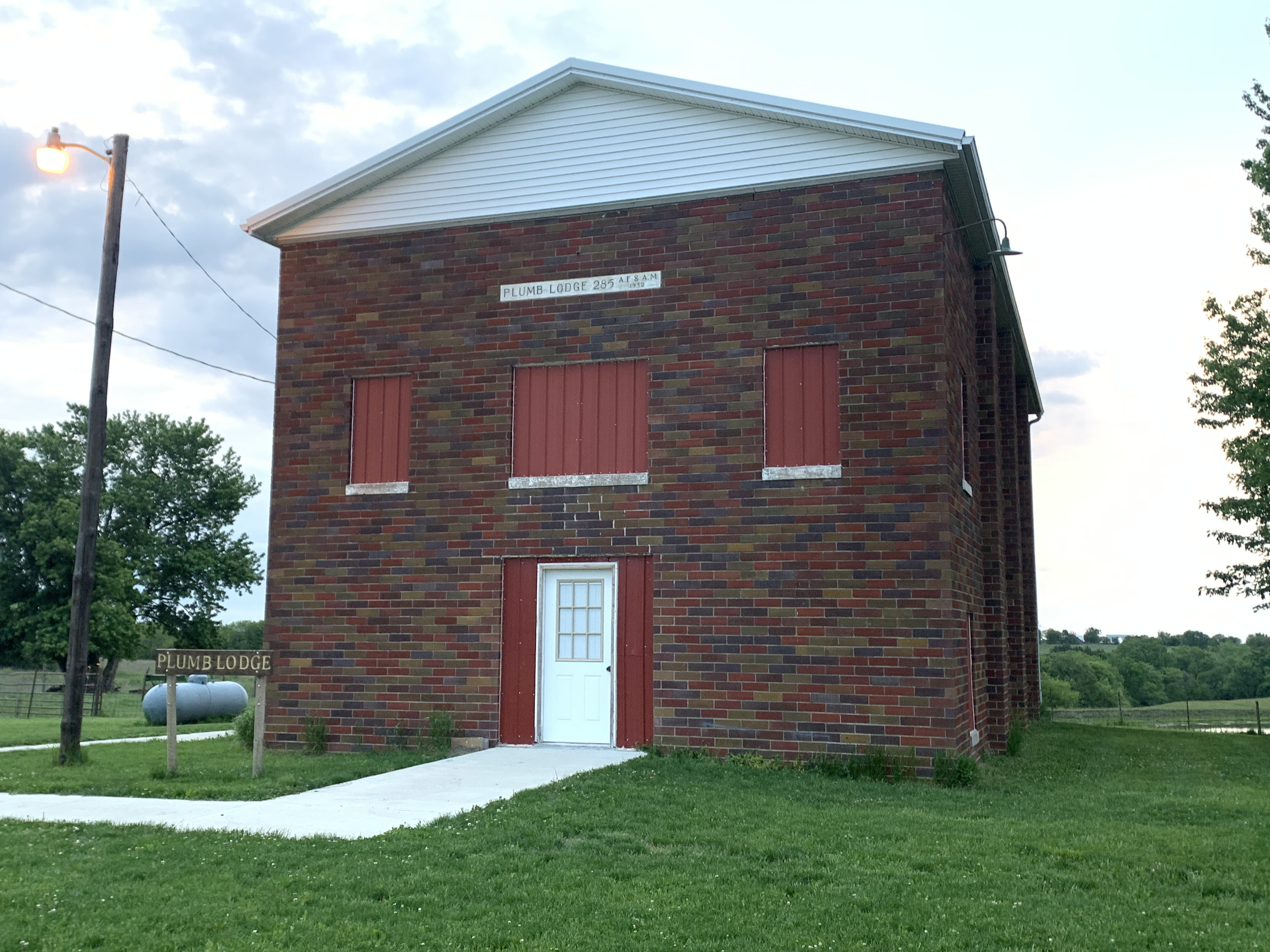
Plum Lodge of Siam, Iowa

Polk Township is a township in Taylor County, Iowa, United States. The community of Siam is located northwest of this township.

== History ==
Polk Township is named for President James K. Polk.
