= Athelstan, Iowa =

- CDP
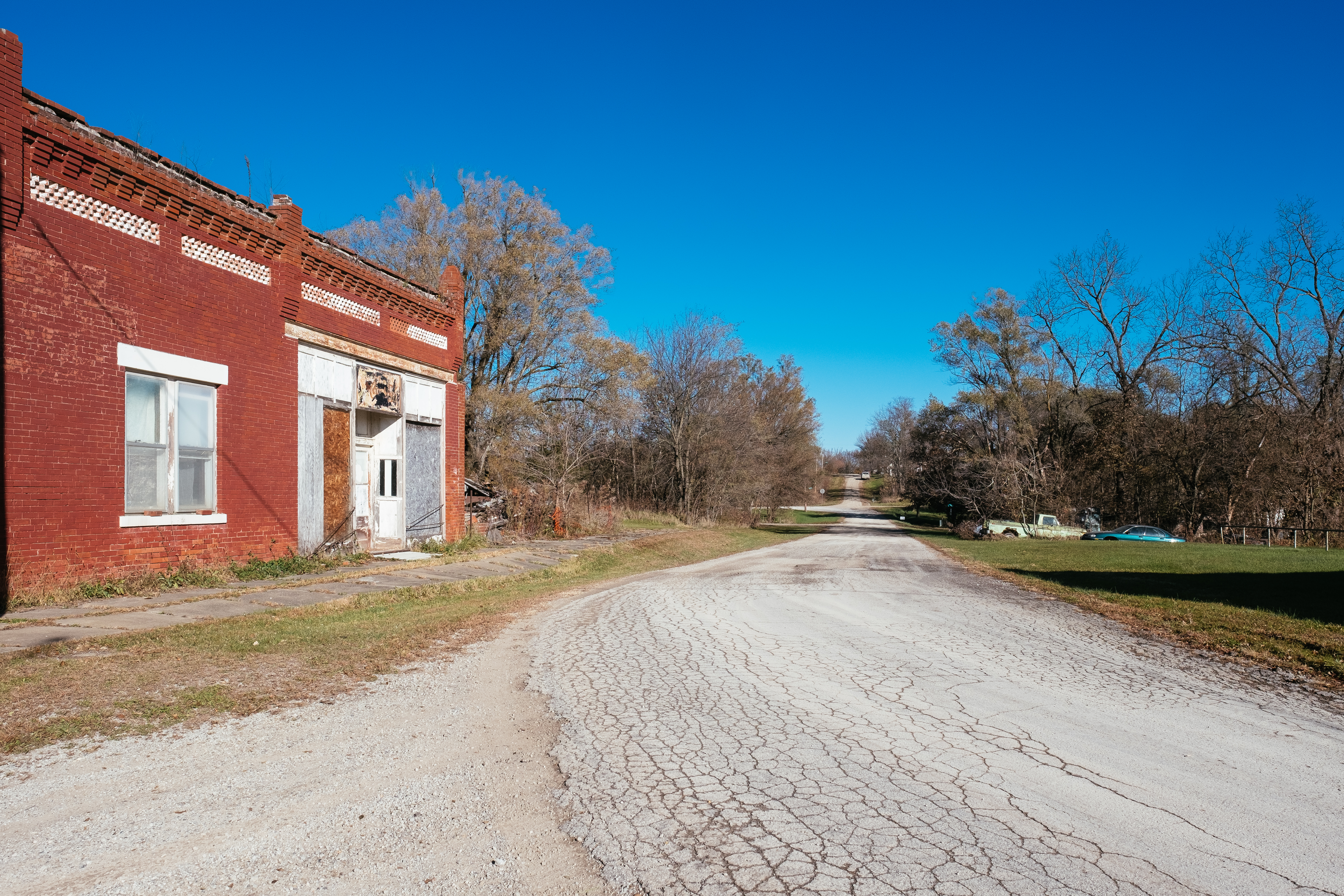
- Looking north on the corner of Main Street

- Location of Athelstan, Iowa
- Coordinates: 40°34′22″N 94°32′33″W
- Country: USA
- State: Iowa
- County: Taylor

Area
  - Total: 0.13 sq mi (0.34 km^{2})
  - Land: 0.13 sq mi (0.34 km^{2})
  - Water: 0 sq mi (0.00 km^{2})
- Elevation: 1,109 ft (338 m)

Population (2020)
  - Total: 6
  - Density: 46/sq mi (17.8/km^{2})
- Time zone: UTC-6 (Central (CST))
  - Summer (DST): UTC-5 (CDT)
- ZIP code: 50836
- Area code: 641
- FIPS code: 19-03430
- GNIS feature ID: 2585466

Athelstan is a census-designated place (CDP) in Taylor County, Iowa, United States, along the Platte River, on the border with Missouri; it is majority owned by the Young family. The population was 6 at the 2020 census.

== History ==
Athelstan got its start following construction of the Chicago Great Western Railroad through the territory. The population was 141 in 1940.

In 2004, after years of rural flight, the depopulated town was disincorporated, ending its existence as a self-governing community.

== Geography ==
Athelstan is adjacent to the Iowa-Missouri border. A small amount of its platted southern portions encroached into Missouri.

According to the 2010 census, the CDP has a total area of 0.13 square miles (0.34 km^{2}), all land.

== Demographics ==
Historical population
| Census | Pop. | Note | %± |
|---|---|---|---|
| 1900 | 255 | | — |
| 1910 | 148 | | −42.0% |
| 1920 | 150 | | 1.4% |
| 1930 | 141 | | −6.0% |
| 1940 | 143 | | 1.4% |
| 1950 | 115 | | −19.6% |
| 1960 | 75 | | −34.8% |
| 1970 | 65 | | −13.3% |
| 1980 | 45 | | −30.8% |
| 1990 | 31 | | −31.1% |
| 2000 | 18 | | −41.9% |
| 2010 | 19 | | 5.6% |
| 2020 | 6 | | −68.4% |
U.S. Decennial Census

=== 2020 census ===
As of the census of 2020, there were 6 people, 0 households, and 0 families residing in the community. The population density was 46.1 inhabitants per square mile (17.8/km^{2}). There were 6 housing units at an average density of 46.1 per square mile (17.8/km^{2}). The racial makeup of the community was 66.7% White, 0.0% Black or African American, 0.0% Native American, 0.0% Asian, 0.0% Pacific Islander, 0.0% from other races and 33.3% from two or more races. Hispanic or Latino persons of any race comprised 0.0% of the population.

The median age in the community was 43.5 years. 0.0% of the residents were under the age of 20; 0.0% were between the ages of 20 and 24; 66.7% were from 25 and 44; 16.7% were from 45 and 64; and 16.7% were 65 years of age or older. The gender makeup of the community was 50.0% male and 50.0% female.

=== 2000 census ===
As of the census of 2000, there were 18 people, 13 households, and 2 families residing in the city. The population density was 138.8 inhabitants per square mile (53.6/km^{2}). There were 16 housing units at an average density of 123.4 per square mile (47.6/km^{2}). The racial makeup of the city was 100.00% White.

There were 13 households, out of which none had children under the age of 18 living with them, 15.4% were married couples living together, and 84.6% were non-families. 61.5% of all households were made up of individuals, and 23.1% had someone living alone who was 65 years of age or older. The average household size was 1.38 and the average family size was 2.00.

In the city the population was spread out, with 5.6% from 18 to 24, 22.2% from 25 to 44, 16.7% from 45 to 64, and 55.6% who were 65 years of age or older. The median age was 68 years. For every 100 females, there were 200.0 males. For every 100 females age 18 and over, there were 200.0 males.

The median income for a household in the city was $23,750, and the median income for a family was $25,625. Males had a median income of $24,688 versus $0 for females. The per capita income for the city was $13,737. There were no families and 31.6% of the population living below the poverty line, including no under eighteens and 50.0% of those over 64.

== Education ==
It is in the Bedford Community School District.

== See also ==
- List of Discontinued cities in Iowa
