= Sharpsburg, Iowa =

- City
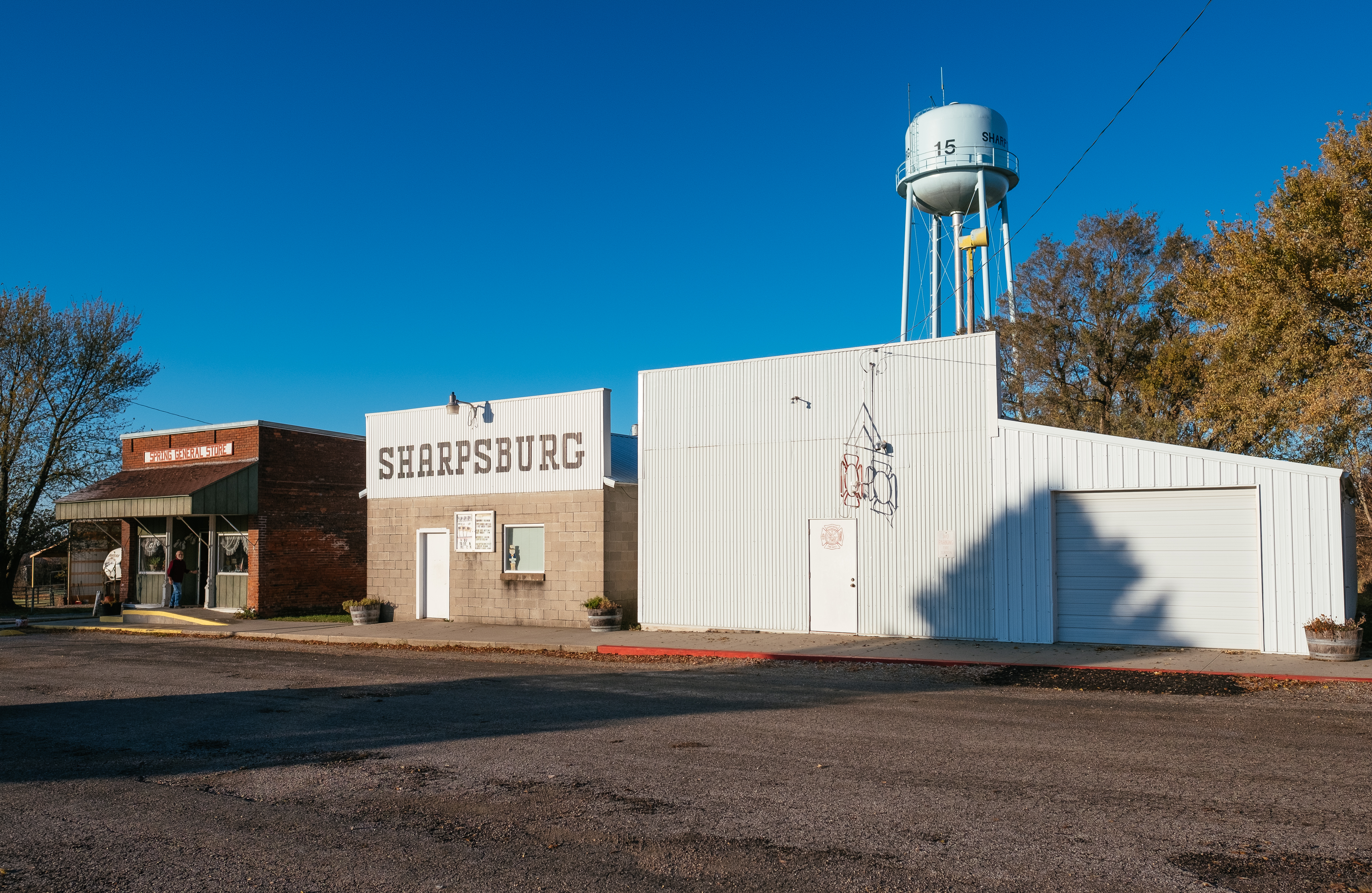
- Store buildings and water tower in Sharpsburg

- Location of Sharpsburg, Iowa
- Coordinates: 40°48′10″N 94°38′26″W
- Country: US
- State: Iowa
- County: Taylor

Area
  - Total: 0.36 sq mi (0.94 km^{2})
  - Land: 0.36 sq mi (0.92 km^{2})
  - Water: 0.0077 sq mi (0.02 km^{2})
- Elevation: 1,286 ft (392 m)

Population (2020)
  - Total: 72
  - Density: 202.1/sq mi (78.04/km^{2})
- Time zone: UTC-6 (Central (CST))
  - Summer (DST): UTC-5 (CDT)
- ZIP code: 50862
- Area code: 641
- FIPS code: 19-72075
- GNIS feature ID: 2395859

Sharpsburg is a city in Taylor County, Iowa, United States. The population was 72 at the time of the 2020 census.

== History ==
Sharpsburg was founded in 1884 as a stop on the Chicago, Burlington and Quincy Railroad. A post office was established in 1886, and the city was incorporated in 1905.

== Geography ==
According to the United States Census Bureau, the city has a total area of 0.37 square miles (0.96 km^{2}), of which 0.36 square miles (0.93 km^{2}) is land and 0.01 square miles (0.03 km^{2}) is water.

== Demographics ==
Historical populations
Year	Pop.	±%
1910	181	—
1920	188	+3.9%
1930	182	−3.2%
1940	173	−4.9%
1950	147	−15.0%
1960	130	−11.6%
1970	106	−18.5%
1980	114	+7.5%
1990	116	+1.8%
2000	98	−15.5%
2010	89	−9.2%
2020	72	−19.1%
Source:"U.S. Census website". United States Census Bureau. and Iowa Data Center; Source: U.S. Decennial Census

=== 2020 census ===
As of the census of 2020, there were 72 people, 24 households, and 17 families residing in the city. The population density was 202.1 inhabitants per square mile (78.0/km^{2}). There were 35 housing units at an average density of 98.3 per square mile (37.9/km^{2}). The racial makeup of the city was 87.5% White, 0.0% Black or African American, 1.4% Native American, 0.0% Asian, 0.0% Pacific Islander, 4.2% from other races and 6.9% from two or more races. Hispanic or Latino persons of any race comprised 12.5% of the population.

Of the 24 households, 20.8% of which had children under the age of 18 living with them, 45.8% were married couples living together, 8.3% were cohabitating couples, 33.3% had a female householder with no spouse or partner present and 12.5% had a male householder with no spouse or partner present. 29.2% of all households were non-families. 25.0% of all households were made up of individuals, 12.5% had someone living alone who was 65 years old or older.

The median age in the city was 40.5 years. 26.4% of the residents were under the age of 20; 1.4% were between the ages of 20 and 24; 23.6% were from 25 and 44; 29.2% were from 45 and 64; and 19.4% were 65 years of age or older. The gender makeup of the city was 54.2% male and 45.8% female.

=== 2010 census ===
As of the census of 2010, there were 89 people, 35 households, and 22 families residing in the city. The population density was 247.2 inhabitants per square mile (95.4/km^{2}). There were 42 housing units at an average density of 116.7 per square mile (45.1/km^{2}). The racial makeup of the city was 98.9% White and 1.1% from two or more races. Hispanic or Latino of any race were 5.6% of the population.

There were 35 households, of which 28.6% had children under the age of 18 living with them, 48.6% were married couples living together, 8.6% had a female householder with no husband present, 5.7% had a male householder with no wife present, and 37.1% were non-families. 34.3% of all households were made up of individuals, and 14.3% had someone living alone who was 65 years of age or older. The average household size was 2.54 and the average family size was 3.23.

The median age in the city was 38.5 years. 25.8% of residents were under the age of 18; 12.4% were between the ages of 18 and 24; 24.6% were from 25 to 44; 16.8% were from 45 to 64; and 20.2% were 65 years of age or older. The gender makeup of the city was 56.2% male and 43.8% female.

=== 2000 census ===
As of the census of 2000, there were 98 people, 39 households, and 26 families residing in the city. The population density was 270.2 inhabitants per square mile (104.3/km^{2}). There were 48 housing units at an average density of 132.4 per square mile (51.1/km^{2}). The racial makeup of the city was 94.90% White, 4.08% Asian, and 1.02% from two or more races.

There were 39 households, out of which 30.8% had children under the age of 18 living with them, 56.4% were married couples living together, 7.7% had a female householder with no husband present, and 33.3% were non-families. 30.8% of all households were made up of individuals, and 17.9% had someone living alone who was 65 years of age or older. The average household size was 2.51 and the average family size was 3.19.

In the city, the population was spread out, with 29.6% under the age of 18, 6.1% from 18 to 24, 20.4% from 25 to 44, 26.5% from 45 to 64, and 17.3% who were 65 years of age or older. The median age was 40 years. For every 100 females, there were 81.5 males. For every 100 females age 18 and over, there were 76.9 males.

The median income for a household in the city was $26,042, and the median income for a family was $28,125. Males had a median income of $20,625 versus $12,083 for females. The per capita income for the city was $8,779. There were 7.4% of families and 14.4% of the population living below the poverty line, including 8.6% of under eighteens and 15.4% of those over 64.

== Education ==
Sharpsburg is a part of the Lenox Community School District.
