= Bedford Township, Taylor County, Iowa =

Township in Taylor County, Iowa, U.S.

Coordinates: 40.6682°N 94.7148°W

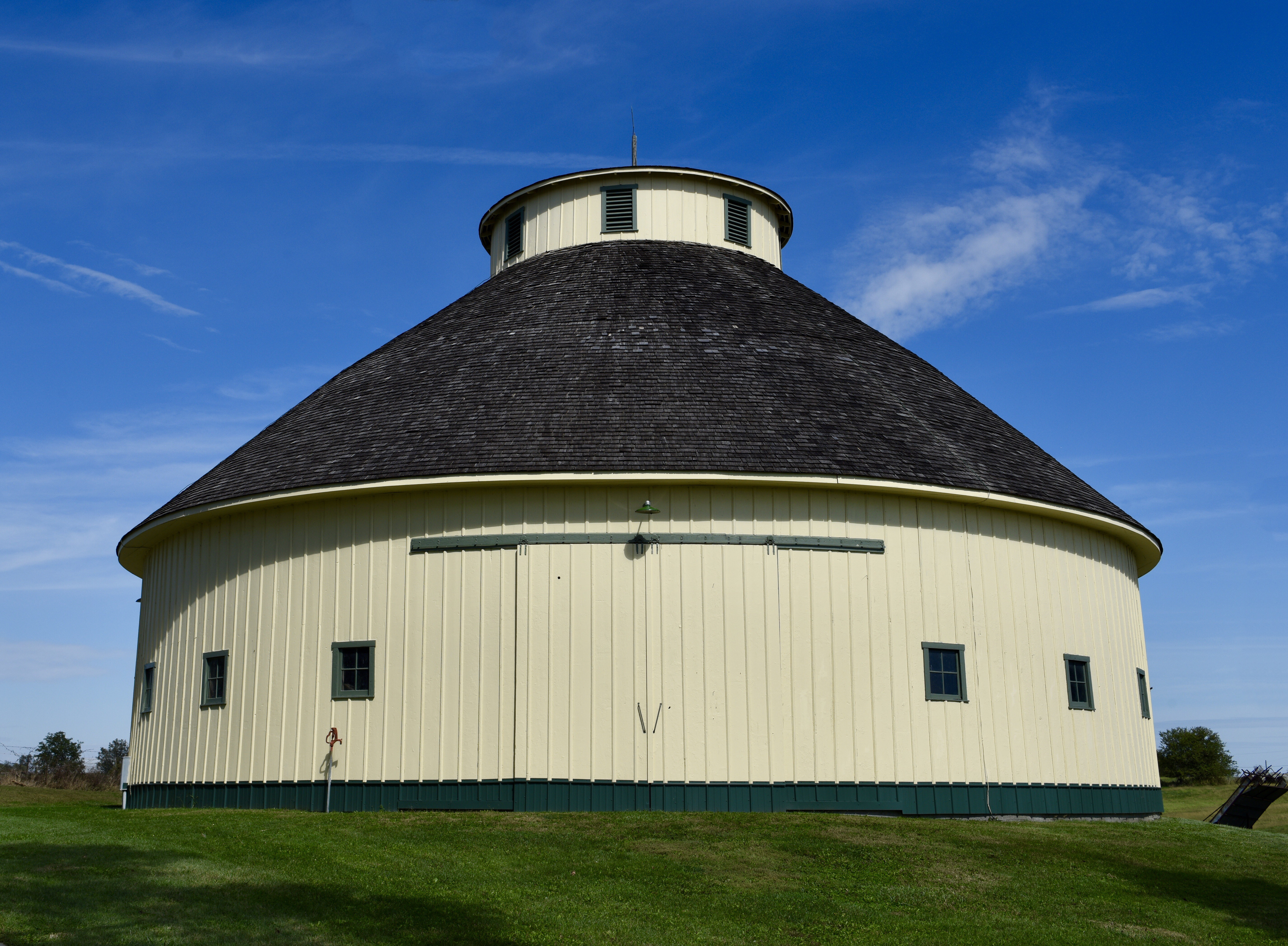
Lenox Round barn at the Taylor County Museum

Bedford Township is a township in Taylor County, Iowa, United States.

== History ==
Bedford Township was established in 1880.
