= Platte Township, Taylor County, Iowa =

Township in Taylor County, Iowa, U.S.

Coordinates: 40.856°N 94.529°W

Platte Township is a township in Taylor County, Iowa, United States.

== History ==
Platte Township was established in 1858.
