= Buchanan Township, Page County, Iowa =

Township in Iowa, USA

Coordinates: 40°36′N 94°58′W

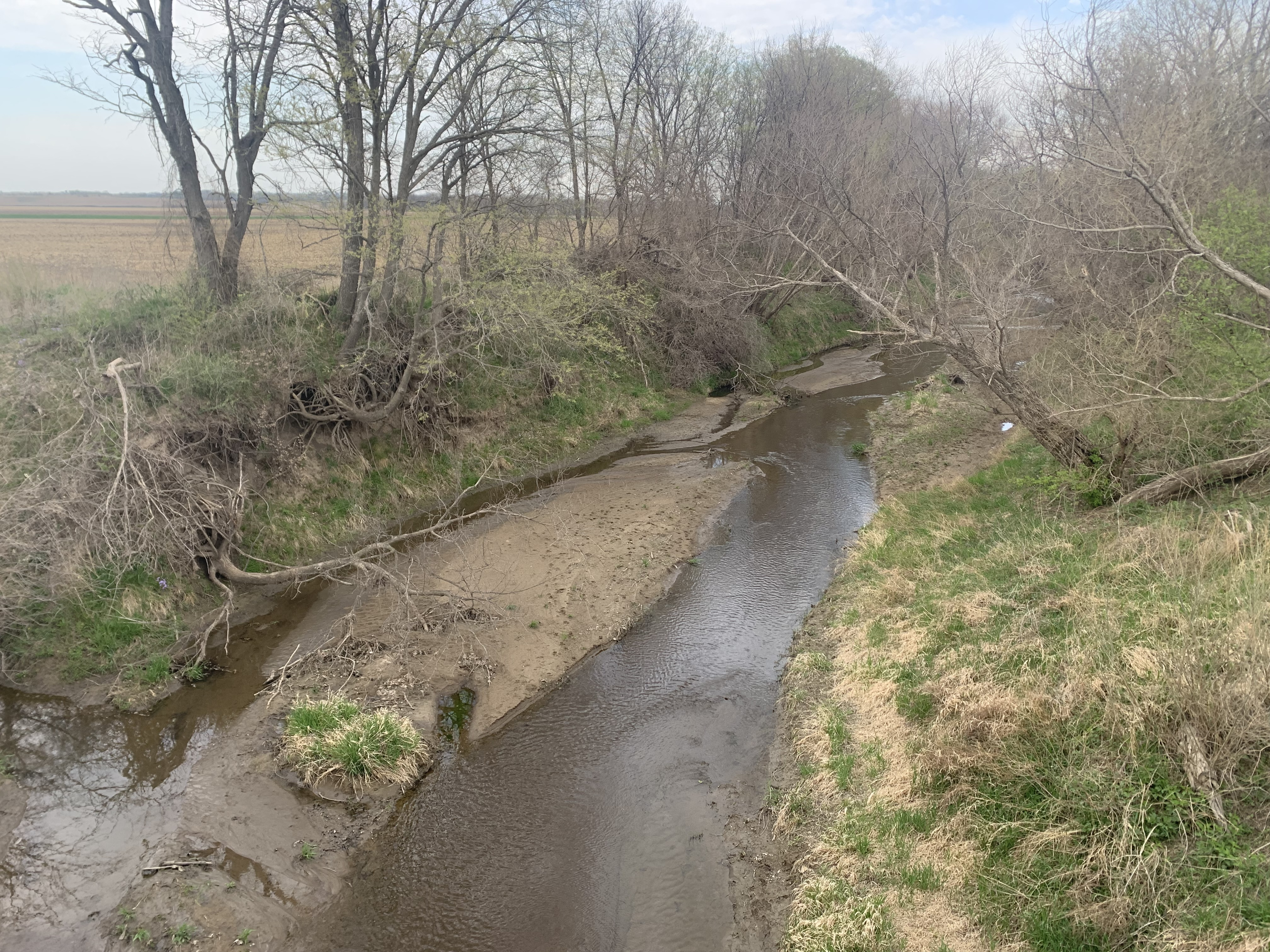
Buchanan Creek on Teak Avenue bridge in western Buchanan Township.

Buchanan Township is a township in Page County, Iowa, United States.

Buchanan Township was named in memory of an army officer who drowned there in 1833 while crossing a creek. It is also the first settled place in Page County by American pioneers when G. W. Farrens built a log cabin in 1840. It was one of the two original townships along with Nodaway Township

Buchanan Township (Township 67, Range 36) was surveyed in January 1846 by Surveyor General of Missouri, Thomas Monroe.

There were three small rural hamlets that existed in the southern and western portions of the township in the late 19th to early 20th centuries, they were the separate towns of Centre, Crooks, and Morseman. Centre was the only of the three settlements to be located along the Burlington, Wabash, St. Louis Railroad.
