= Lenox Community School District =

Public school district in Lenox, Iowa, United States

Coordinates: 40.876175°N 94.556803°W

Location
- Lenox, Iowa Adams, Ringgold, Taylor, and Union counties United States
- Coordinates: 40.876175, -94.556803

District information
- Type: Local school district
- Grades: K-12
- Established: 1878
- Superintendent: David Henrichs
- Schools: 2
- Budget: $7,890,000 (2020-21)
- NCES District ID: 1916620

Students and staff
- Students: 520 (2022-23)
- Teachers: 42.30 FTE
- Staff: 40.60 FTE
- Student–teacher ratio: 12.29
- Athletic conference: Pride of Iowa
- District mascot: Tigers
- Colors: Black and Gold

Other information
- Website: www.lenoxschools.org

Lenox Community School District is a rural public school district headquartered in Lenox, Iowa.

It includes portions of Adams, Ringgold, Taylor, and Union counties. Communities in its area include Lenox, Clearfield, and Sharpsburg.

== History ==
The district began operations in 1878. The district has a single school building at 600 S. Locust St., built in 1968. The elementary school previously had a separate building at 301 W. Michigan Street, but in 2005 moved into 600 S. Locust.

In 1913. Lenox schools published their first school song, "Black and gold"

In 1968, the school was separated from K-12 to an elementary school and high school.

When the Clearfield Community School District closed in 2014, the Lenox district absorbed a portion of it.

== Schools ==
- Lenox Elementary School
- Lenox High School

=== Lenox High School ===
==== Athletics ====
The Tigers compete in the Pride of Iowa Conference in the following sports:

- Football
  - 2008 8-player class State Champions
- Volleyball
- Cross Country
- Basketball
- Wrestling
- Bowling
- Golf
- Track and Field
- Baseball
  - 2006 Class 1A State Champions
- Softball

== See also ==
- List of school districts in Iowa
- List of high schools in Iowa
