= Mason Township, Taylor County, Iowa =

Township in Taylor County, Iowa

Coordinates: 40.688°N 94.857°W

Mason Township is a township in Taylor County, Iowa, United States.

== History ==
Mason Township is named for James Mason, a pioneer settler.
