= Nodaway Township, Page County, Iowa =

Township in Page County, Iowa, U.S.

Coordinates: 40°46′08″N 95°04′05″W

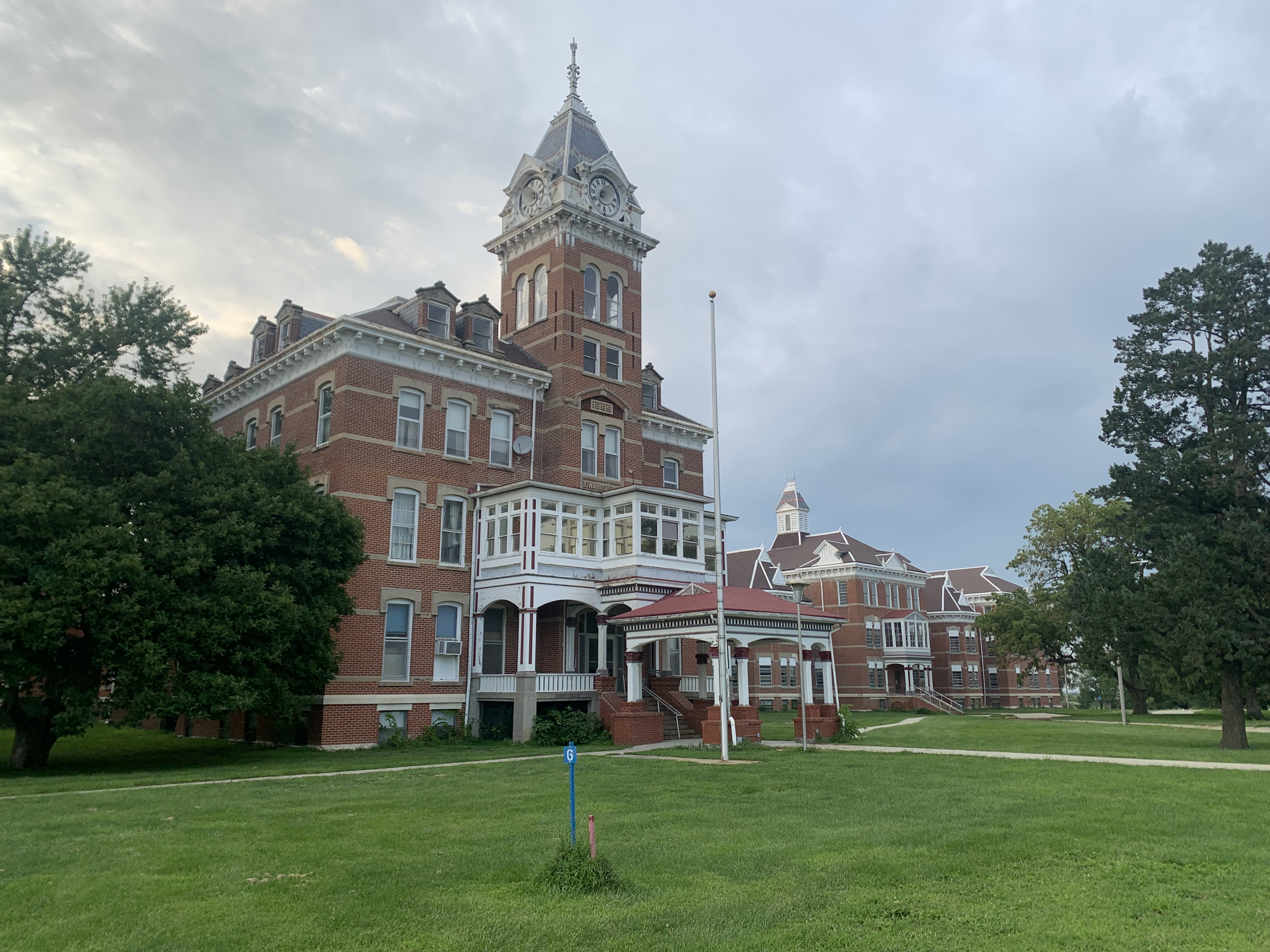
Building in the Clarinda Treatment Complex in southern Nodaway Township

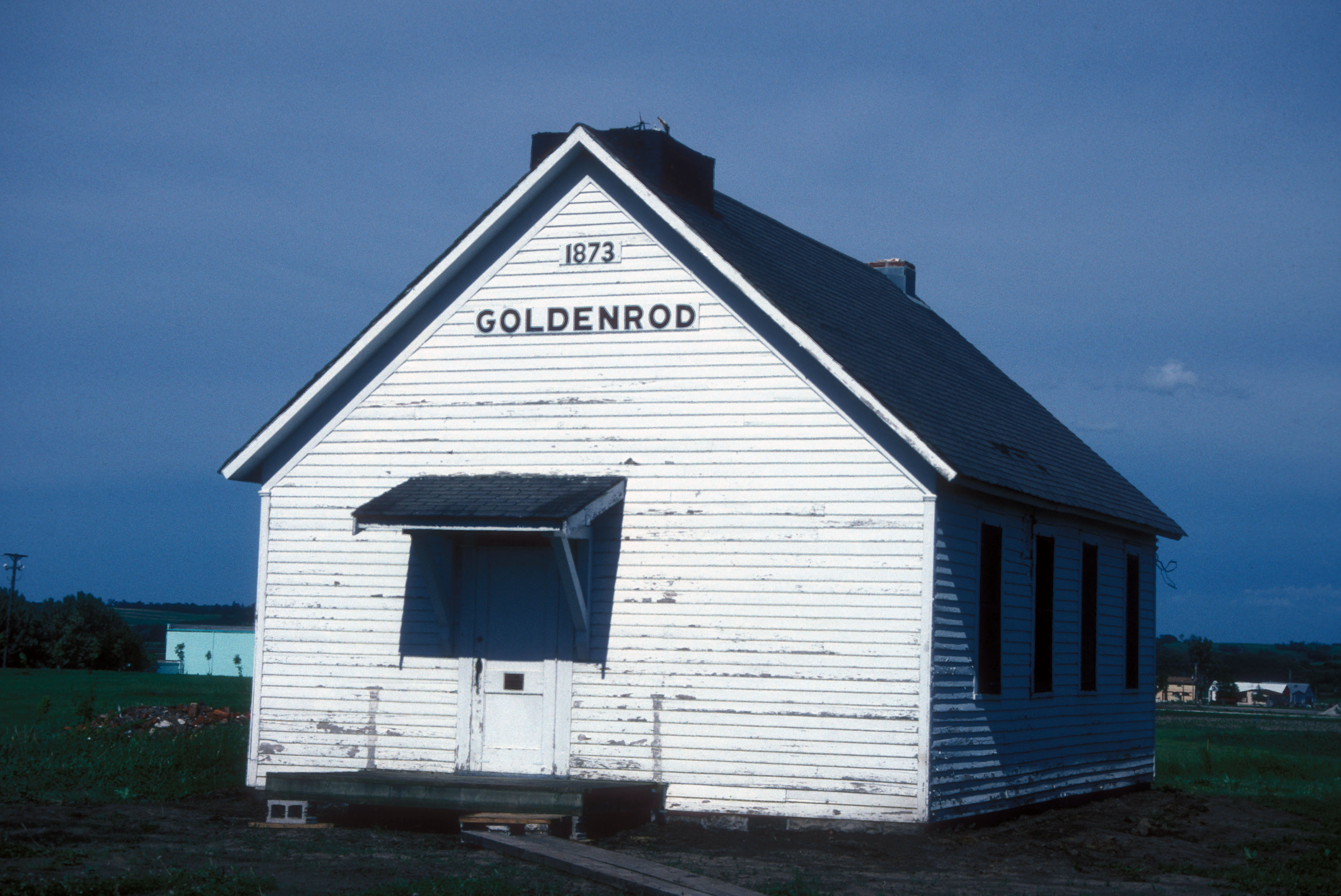
Historic schoolhouse in Clarinda, Iowa

Nodaway Township is a township in Page County, Iowa. Clarinda, the seat of Page County, is located in Nodaway Township.

== History ==
Nodaway Township (Township 69, Range 37) was surveyed in November 1851 by Wm. Dunn and was established in 1858. It was one of the two original townships along with Buchanan Township.
