= Nodaway Township, Taylor County, Iowa =

Township in Taylor County, Iowa, U.S.

Coordinates: 40.857°N 94.872°W

Nodaway Township is a township in Taylor County, Iowa, United States.

It has a population of 181 and an area of 35.9 sq. mi.

== History ==
Nodaway Township was established in 1858.
