= Taylor County, Iowa =

County in Iowa, United States

- County
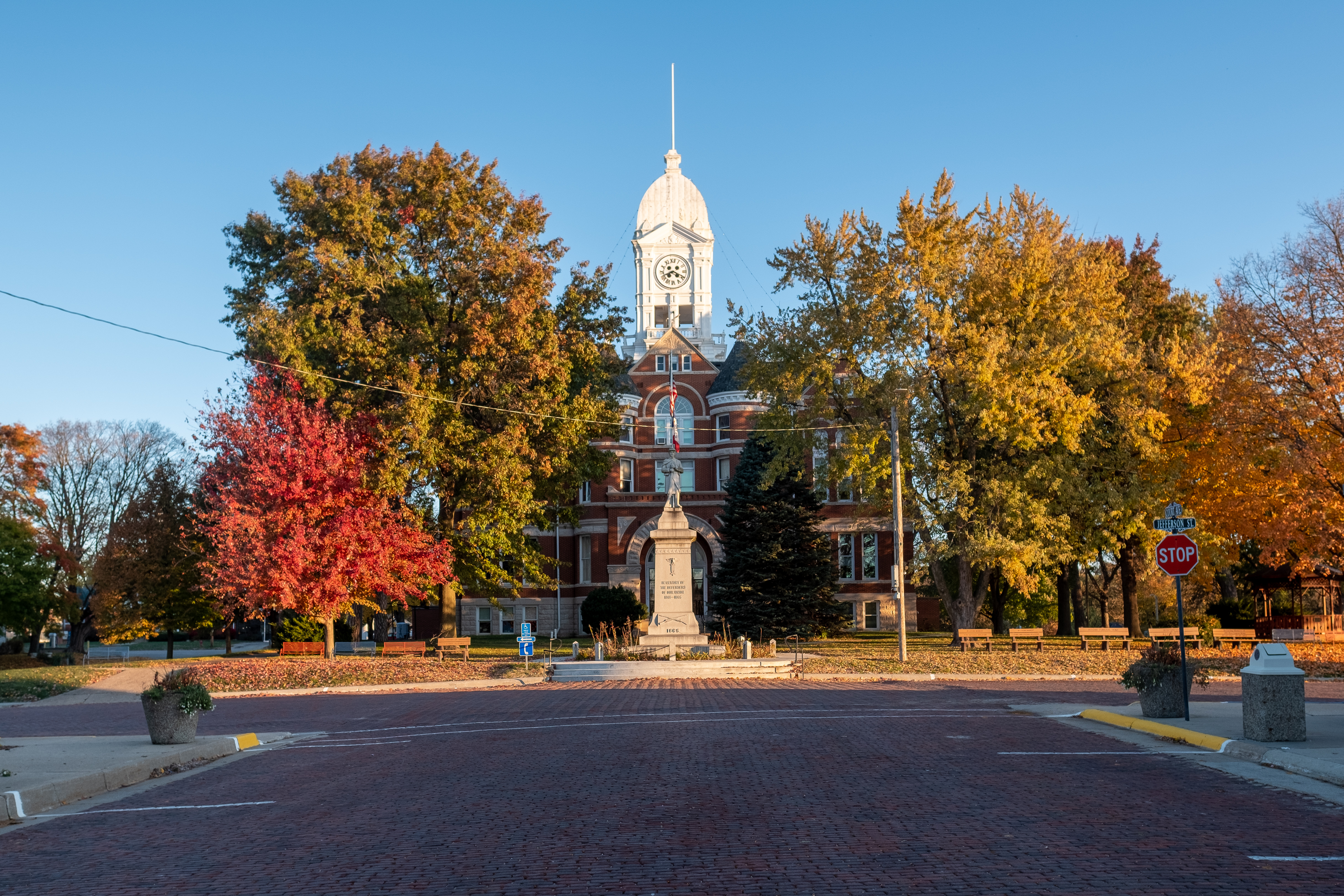
- The Taylor County Courthouse in Bedford

- Location within the U.S. state of Iowa
- Coordinates: 40°44′09″N 94°41′33″W
- Country: United States
- State: Iowa
- Founded: 1847
- Named for: Zachary Taylor
- Seat: Bedford
- Largest city: Bedford

Area
  - Total: 535 sq mi (1,390 km^{2})
  - Land: 532 sq mi (1,380 km^{2})
  - Water: 2.8 sq mi (7.3 km^{2}) 0.5%

Population (2020)
  - Total: 5,896
  - Estimate (2025): 5,835 ▼
  - Density: 11.1/sq mi (4.28/km^{2})
- Time zone: UTC−6 (Central)
  - Summer (DST): UTC−5 (CDT)
- Congressional district: 3rd
- Website: taylorcounty.iowa.gov
- Iowa county number 87

Taylor County is a county located in the U.S. state of Iowa. As of the 2020 census, the population was 5,896, making it the fourth-least populous county in Iowa. The county seat is Bedford. The county was formed in 1847 and named after General and President Zachary Taylor.

== Geography ==
According to the United States Census Bureau, the county has a total area of 535 square miles (1,390 km^{2}), of which 532 square miles (1,380 km^{2}) is land and 2.8 square miles (7.3 km^{2}) (0.5%) is water.

A portion of Taylor County at one time was part of Missouri.

=== Major highways ===
- Iowa Highway 2
- Iowa Highway 25
- Iowa Highway 148

=== Adjacent counties ===
- Adams County (north)
- Ringgold County (east)
- Worth County, Missouri (southeast)
- Nodaway County, Missouri (southwest)
- Page County (west)

== Demographics ==
Historical population
Census	Pop.	Note	%±
1850	204		—
1860	3,590		1,659.8%
1870	6,989		94.7%
1880	15,635		123.7%
1890	16,384		4.8%
1900	18,784		14.6%
1910	16,312		−13.2%
1920	15,514		−4.9%
1930	14,859		−4.2%
1940	14,258		−4.0%
1950	12,420		−12.9%
1960	10,288		−17.2%
1970	8,790		−14.6%
1980	8,353		−5.0%
1990	7,114		−14.8%
2000	6,958		−2.2%
2010	6,317		−9.2%
2020	5,896		−6.7%
2025 (est.)	5,835	▼	−1.0%
U.S. Decennial Census; 1790–1960 1900–1990; 1990–2000 2010–2020

=== 2020 census ===
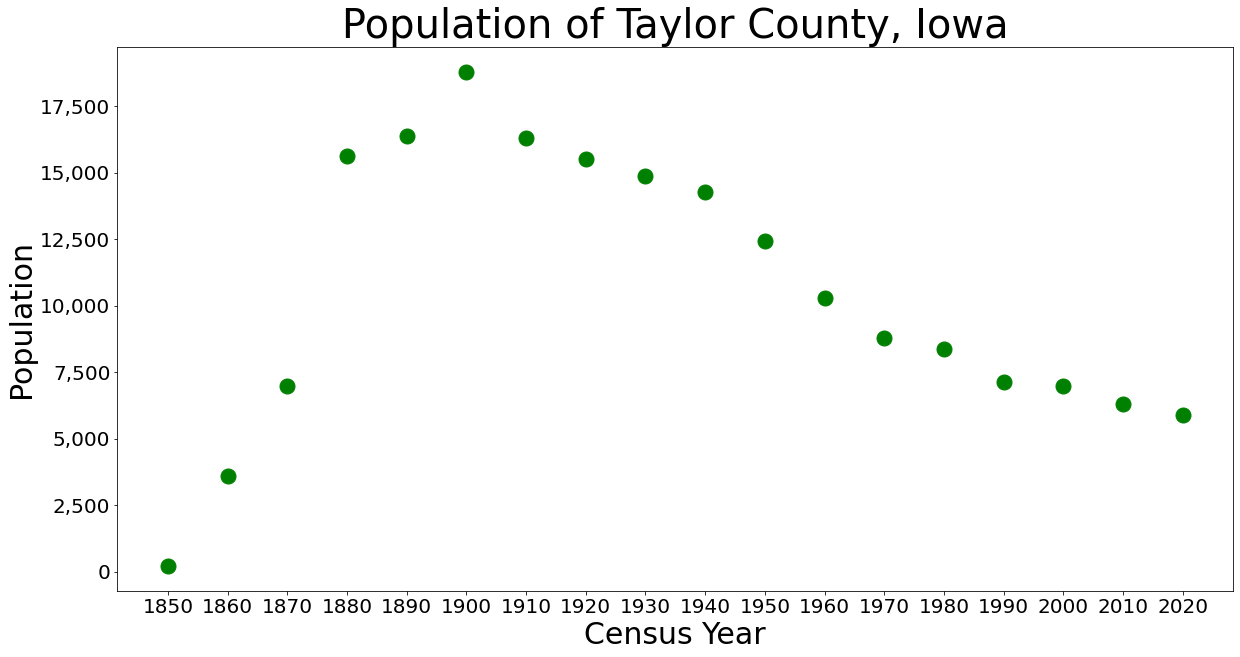
Population of Taylor County from the U.S. census data

As of the 2020 census, the county had a population of 5,896 and a population density of 11.000/sq mi (4.247/km^{2}). 95.76% of the population reported being of one race.

The median age was 43.5 years. 23.4% of residents were under the age of 18 and 24.1% of residents were 65 years of age or older. For every 100 females there were 101.5 males, and for every 100 females age 18 and over there were 96.3 males age 18 and over.

There were 2,506 households in the county, of which 27.3% had children under the age of 18 living in them. Of all households, 51.8% were married-couple households, 18.2% were households with a male householder and no spouse or partner present, and 23.7% were households with a female householder and no spouse or partner present. About 30.9% of all households were made up of individuals and 17.6% had someone living alone who was 65 years of age or older.

There were 2,885 housing units, of which 13.1% were vacant, leaving 2,506 occupied units; among the occupied units, 77.4% were owner-occupied and 22.6% were renter-occupied. The homeowner vacancy rate was 2.2% and the rental vacancy rate was 6.9%.

<0.1% of residents lived in urban areas, while 100.0% lived in rural areas.

The racial makeup of the county was 91.8% White, <0.1% Black or African American, 0.3% American Indian and Alaska Native, 0.3% Asian, 0.1% Native Hawaiian and Pacific Islander, 3.3% from some other race, and 4.2% from two or more races. Hispanic or Latino residents of any race comprised 6.8% of the population.

Taylor County Racial Composition
Race	Number	Percent
White (NH)	5,304	90%
Black or African American (NH)	1	0.02%
Native American (NH)	13	0.22%
Asian (NH)	15	0.25%
Pacific Islander (NH)	1	0.02%
Other/Mixed (NH)	163	2.76%
Hispanic or Latino	399	6.76%

=== 2010 census ===
As of the 2010 census recorded a population of 6,317 in the county, with a population density of 11.8/sq mi (4.6/km^{2}). There were 3,107 housing units, of which 2,679 were occupied.

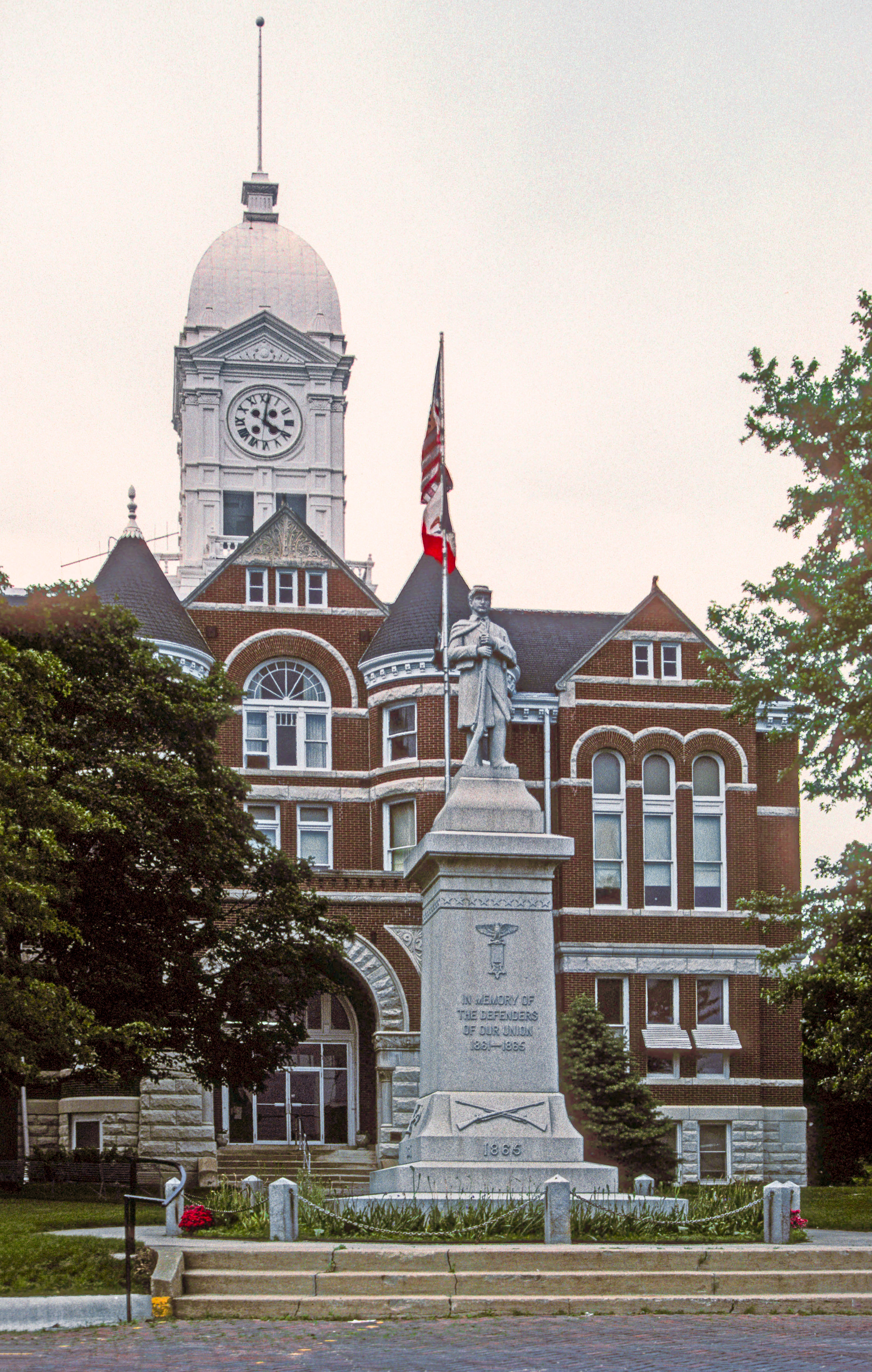
Taylor County courthouse

=== 2000 census ===
As of the 2000 census, there were 6,958 people, 2,824 households, and 1,911 families in the county. The population density was 13 people per square mile (5.0 people/km^{2}). There were 3,199 housing units at an average density of 6 units per square mile (2.3 units/km^{2}). The racial makeup of the county was 97.71% White, 0.03% Black or African American, 0.10% Native American, 0.30% Asian, 0.06% Pacific Islander, 1.14% from other races, and 0.66% from two or more races. 3.81% were Hispanic or Latino of any race.

There were 2,824 households 28.00% had children under the age of 18 living with them, 59.00% were married couples living together, 5.90% had a female householder with no husband present, and 32.30% were non-families. 27.80% of households were one person and 16.10% were one person aged 65 or older. The average household size was 2.40 and the average family size was 2.94.

The age distribution was 23.90% under the age of 18, 7.50% from 18 to 24, 23.40% from 25 to 44, 22.80% from 45 to 64, and 22.40% 65 or older. The median age was 42 years. For every 100 females there were 94.10 males. For every 100 females age 18 and over, there were 92.00 males.

The median household income was $31,297 and the median family income was $37,194. Males had a median income of $26,631 versus $19,162 for females. The per capita income for the county was $15,082. About 8.50% of families and 12.10% of the population were below the poverty line, including 13.10% of those under age 18 and 15.20% of those age 65 or over.

== Communities ==
=== Cities ===
- Bedford
- Blockton
- Clearfield (partially)
- Conway
- Gravity
- Lenox (partially)
- New Market
- Sharpsburg

=== Census-designated place ===
- Athelstan

=== Townships ===
- Bedford
- Benton
- Clayton
- Dallas
- Gay
- Grant
- Grove
- Holt
- Jackson
- Jefferson
- Marshall
- Mason
- Nodaway
- Platte
- Polk
- Ross
- Washington

=== Population ranking ===
The population ranking of the following table is based on the 2020 census of Taylor County.

† county seat

Rank	City/Town/etc.	Municipal type	Population (2020 Census)
1	† Bedford	City	1,508
2	Lenox (partially in Adams County)	City	1,339 (1,339 total)
3	New Market	City	385
4	Clearfield (partially in Ringgold County)	City	272 (278 total)
5	Gravity	City	154
6	Blockton	City	125
7	Sharpsburg	City	72
8	Conway	City	17
9	Athelstan	CDP	6

== Politics ==
United States presidential election results for Taylor County, Iowa
Year	Republican		Democratic		Third party(ies)	
Year	No.	%	No.	%	No.	%
1896	2,468	51.55%	2,293	47.89%	27	0.56%
1900	2,792	57.25%	1,984	40.68%	101	2.07%
1904	2,650	65.90%	1,060	26.36%	311	7.73%
1908	2,460	58.77%	1,585	37.86%	141	3.37%
1912	1,364	35.40%	1,372	35.61%	1,117	28.99%
1916	2,219	54.70%	1,775	43.75%	63	1.55%
1920	4,997	72.41%	1,757	25.46%	147	2.13%
1924	4,254	60.95%	1,138	16.30%	1,588	22.75%
1928	4,700	68.68%	2,074	30.31%	69	1.01%
1932	2,670	45.07%	3,159	53.33%	95	1.60%
1936	4,145	54.94%	3,337	44.23%	63	0.83%
1940	4,420	59.56%	2,976	40.10%	25	0.34%
1944	3,804	61.35%	2,376	38.32%	20	0.32%
1948	3,244	56.93%	2,402	42.16%	52	0.91%
1952	4,608	71.74%	1,784	27.78%	31	0.48%
1956	3,533	59.10%	2,436	40.75%	9	0.15%
1960	3,452	61.85%	2,126	38.09%	3	0.05%
1964	2,162	43.75%	2,780	56.25%	0	0.00%
1968	2,765	59.64%	1,501	32.38%	370	7.98%
1972	3,042	70.16%	1,247	28.76%	47	1.08%
1976	2,059	50.79%	1,947	48.03%	48	1.18%
1980	2,715	64.44%	1,226	29.10%	272	6.46%
1984	2,496	62.06%	1,499	37.27%	27	0.67%
1988	1,647	49.43%	1,671	50.15%	14	0.42%
1992	1,200	33.79%	1,430	40.27%	921	25.94%
1996	1,419	43.32%	1,458	44.51%	399	12.18%
2000	1,770	57.17%	1,247	40.28%	79	2.55%
2004	1,908	59.81%	1,252	39.25%	30	0.94%
2008	1,607	53.11%	1,347	44.51%	72	2.38%
2012	1,683	56.19%	1,262	42.14%	50	1.67%
2016	2,111	69.69%	758	25.02%	160	5.28%
2020	2,463	75.81%	746	22.96%	40	1.23%
2024	2,381	77.28%	666	21.62%	34	1.10%

== Education ==
School districts include:

- Bedford Community School District
- Clarinda Community School District
- Corning Community School District
- Diagonal Community School District
- Lenox Community School District
- Mount Ayr Community School District
- Villisca Community School District

Former school districts:

- Clearfield Community School District - Dissolved on July 1, 2014.
- New Market Community School District - Dissolved on July 1, 2008.

== See also ==
- National Register of Historic Places listings in Taylor County, Iowa
