= Humeston and Shenandoah Railway =

Former railroad in Iowa, U.S.

The Humeston and Shenandoah Railway (earlier Humeston and Shenandoah Railroad until 1896) was part of a collection of railroad lines built as a westward extension to the Missouri, Iowa, and Nebraska Railway across southern Iowa, US, in the last half of the 19th century. These lines were later exclusively operated, during the 20th century, by the Burlington Route. The Humeston and Shenandoah were originally envisioned as part of a strategy to allow Jay Gould and his Wabash Railroad to reach Omaha, Nebraska. The line's construction was contested, however, by the Burlington Route, and eventually Gould compromised and allowed the H&S Railroad to be built as a joint initiative with the Burlington. Upon completion of construction, the H&S line was leased for operation to a company owned jointly by the Wabash and the Burlington on April 1, 1881, and operated for their joint accounts. This arrangement continued until the Wabash bankruptcy of 1899, after which the line was operated by the Burlington Route under lease.

== Overview ==
Organized as an Iowa corporation on February 12, 1881, the railroad was built with 113 miles (182 km) of track. It had 18 locomotives on its roster as it started operations, and by 1898, H&S listed 14 locomotives. Most original H&S locomotives were 4-4-0s built by the Pittsburgh Locomotive Co. The H&S track was built connecting Humeston, Iowa westward to Shenandoah, Iowa. To the east, it handed traffic off to the MI&N and, later, to the Keokuk and Western Railroad, the successor to the MI&N. The H&S had enough business and was doing well enough to be acquired outright by the Burlington Route in 1901. Primary traffic on the line in the early 1900s was bituminous coal mined in southern Iowa, grains, cattle and livestock, less-than-carload merchandise, and timber products. The railroad also had a considerable passenger business up until about 1920.

== Great Depression ==
The H&S fell on hard times as the Great Depression, the advent of the automobile, improved roads, public subsidies for those roads, and trucks came along in the late 1920s. Freight and passenger traffic declined, and the H&S was abandoned in pieces, starting with the line segment from Norwich to Clarinda, Iowa, during the height of the Great Depression (December 1935). Other segments abandoned were the Shenandoah to Norwich segment in April 1938; Clarinda to Merle Jct. in December 1945; and Clearfield to Humeston, also in December 1945. The last and final segment of the H&S to disappear was the trackage between Merle Jct. and Clearfield, Iowa, which was abandoned in 1983.

== Decline ==
The H&S was built across the hilly terrain of southern Iowa, and the line suffered operationally from steep ruling grades, numerous curves, and many trestles that had to be built and maintained. The loss of timber trestles due to fire led to many of the line segments being put up for abandonment. The southern Iowa economy has generally lagged behind much of the remainder of Iowa and the Midwest, and H&S suffered from a lack of industrial development along its line. The line's revenue base relied too much on coal, products of agriculture, and passenger operations for it to remain profitable once autos and trucks came to the area of southern Iowa.

== Remains ==
The abandoned right-of-way of the Humeston and Shenandoah Railway is still visible in places along public roadways or close to Iowa Highway 2, which traverses the state from east to west.

== Sources ==
- Corbin, Bernard G.; Hardy, Joseph C. (1986). Across Iowa On The Keokuk & Western & the Humeston and Shenadoah Railroads. Red Oak, Iowa: Valley Printing Co. LCCN 85-073174.
- Baldwin, William (1929). Chicago, Burlington & Quincy Railroad Co., Documentary History. Vol. 3, Lines West of the Mississippi River. Chicago: R.R. Donnelley & Sons.
