= Clearfield Community School District =

Former school district in Iowa

Clearfield Community School District was a school district headquartered in Clearfield, Iowa. It operated one school: Clearfield Community School.

In 2014 the district had a total of 27 students.

Due to a declining financial situation, the district leadership attempted to find another school district willing to do a consolidation, but it could not find a willing merger partner. The voters approved a proposal to dissolve the district. Four other school districts absorbed pieces of the Clearfield district: Bedford, Diagonal, Lenox, and Mt Ayr. The dissolution was effective July 1, 2014.
