= New Market, Iowa =

- City
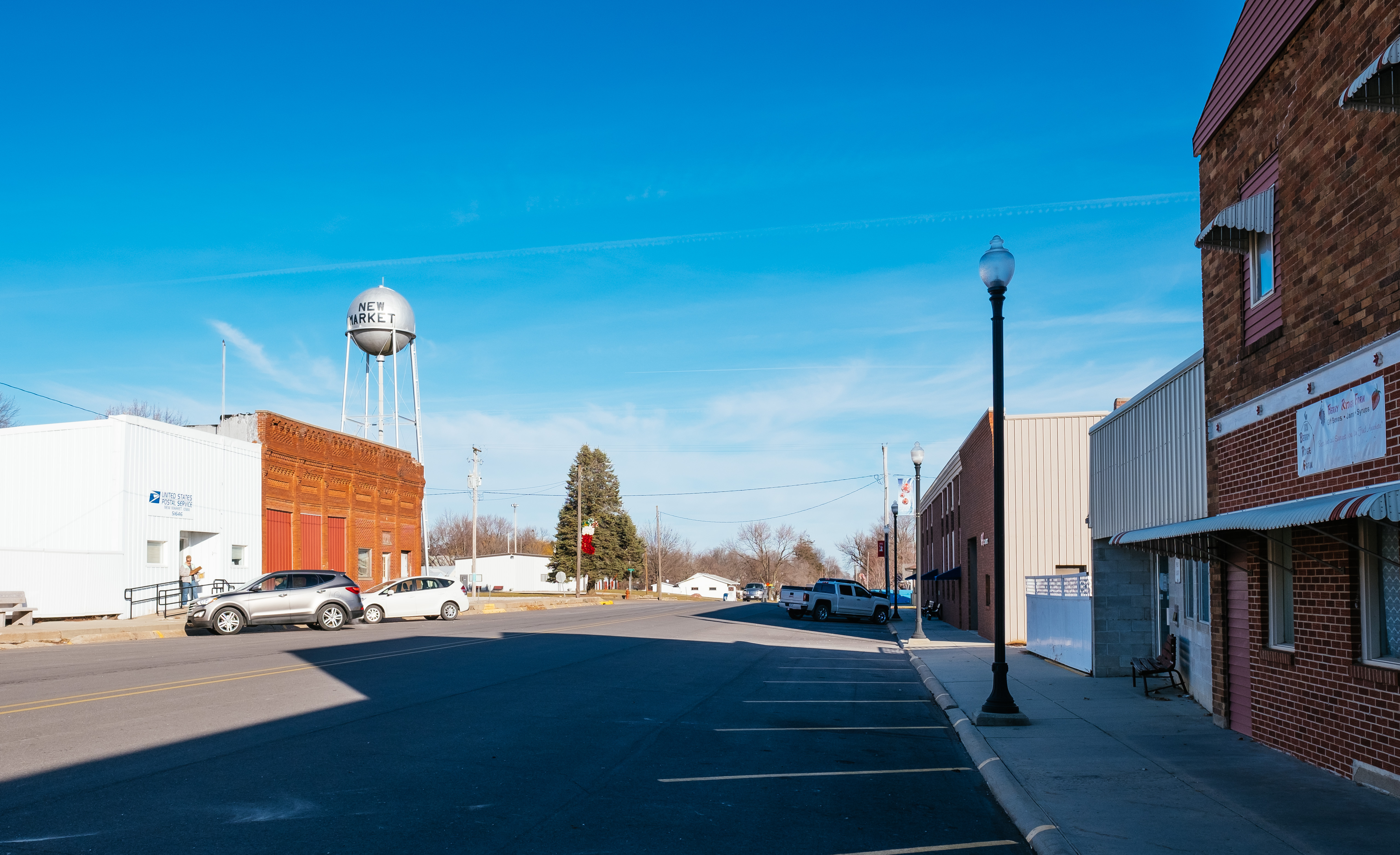
- Downtown New Market

- Location of New Market, Iowa
- Coordinates: 40°43′57″N 94°54′02″W
- Country: United States
- State: Iowa
- County: Taylor

Area
  - Total: 0.43 sq mi (1.12 km^{2})
  - Land: 0.43 sq mi (1.12 km^{2})
  - Water: 0 sq mi (0.00 km^{2})
- Elevation: 1,227 ft (374 m)

Population (2020)
  - Total: 385
  - Density: 889.5/sq mi (343.45/km^{2})
- Time zone: UTC-6 (Central (CST))
  - Summer (DST): UTC-5 (CDT)
- ZIP code: 51646
- Area code: 712
- FIPS code: 19-56370
- GNIS feature ID: 2395207
- Website: https://newmarketia.com/

New Market is a city in Taylor County, Iowa, United States. The population was 385 at the time of the 2020 census.

== History ==
New Market was founded in 1881, following construction of the Humeston and Shenandoah Railroad through the territory.

New Market had a sundown town ordinance into the 1980s.

== Geography ==
According to the United States Census Bureau, the city has a total area of 0.44 square miles (1.14 km^{2}), all land.

== Demographics ==
Historical populations
| Year | Pop. | ±% |
|---|---|---|
| 1890 | 320 | — |
| 1900 | 600 | +87.5% |
| 1910 | 673 | +12.2% |
| 1920 | 745 | +10.7% |
| 1930 | 630 | −15.4% |
| 1940 | 681 | +8.1% |
| 1950 | 573 | −15.9% |
| 1960 | 506 | −11.7% |
| 1970 | 501 | −1.0% |
| 1980 | 554 | +10.6% |
| 1990 | 454 | −18.1% |
| 2000 | 456 | +0.4% |
| 2010 | 415 | −9.0% |
| 2020 | 385 | −7.2% |
Source:"U.S. Census website". United States Census Bureau. and Iowa Data Center; Source: U.S. Decennial Census

=== 2020 census ===
As of the census of 2020, there were 385 people, 192 households, and 119 families residing in the city. The population density was 889.5 inhabitants per square mile (343.4/km^{2}). There were 202 housing units at an average density of 466.7 per square mile (180.2/km^{2}). The racial makeup of the city was 95.8% White, 0.0% Black or African American, 0.0% Native American, 1.3% Asian, 0.0% Pacific Islander, 0.8% from other races and 2.1% from two or more races. Hispanic or Latino persons of any race comprised 0.5% of the population.

Of the 192 households, 24.0% of which had children under the age of 18 living with them, 48.4% were married couples living together, 8.3% were cohabitating couples, 24.0% had a female householder with no spouse or partner present and 19.3% had a male householder with no spouse or partner present. 38.0% of all households were non-families. 34.9% of all households were made up of individuals, 19.8% had someone living alone who was 65 years old or older.

The median age in the city was 52.5 years. 19.5% of the residents were under the age of 20; 6.2% were between the ages of 20 and 24; 18.2% were from 25 and 44; 29.6% were from 45 and 64; and 26.5% were 65 years of age or older. The gender makeup of the city was 48.1% male and 51.9% female.

=== 2010 census ===
As of the census of 2010, there were 415 people, 190 households, and 117 families residing in the city. The population density was 943.2 inhabitants per square mile (364.2/km^{2}). There were 212 housing units at an average density of 481.8 per square mile (186.0/km^{2}). The racial makeup of the city was 98.1% White, 0.2% Native American, 0.2% Asian, and 1.4% from two or more races. Hispanic or Latino of any race were 0.2% of the population.

There were 190 households, of which 29.5% had children under the age of 18 living with them, 45.8% were married couples living together, 9.5% had a female householder with no husband present, 6.3% had a male householder with no wife present, and 38.4% were non-families. 33.2% of all households were made up of individuals, and 14.8% had someone living alone who was 65 years of age or older. The average household size was 2.18 and the average family size was 2.68.

The median age in the city was 41.8 years. 22.9% of residents were under the age of 18; 7.5% were between the ages of 18 and 24; 23.6% were from 25 to 44; 27.2% were from 45 to 64; and 18.8% were 65 years of age or older. The gender makeup of the city was 48.2% male and 51.8% female.

=== 2000 census ===
As of the census of 2000, there were 456 people, 205 households, and 128 families residing in the city. The population density was 1,038.7 inhabitants per square mile (401.0/km^{2}). There were 224 housing units at an average density of 510.2 per square mile (197.0/km^{2}). The racial makeup of the city was 99.34% White, 0.22% Native American and 0.44% Asian. Hispanic or Latino of any race were 0.44% of the population.

There were 205 households, out of which 25.9% had children under the age of 18 living with them, 49.8% were married couples living together, 8.3% had a female householder with no husband present, and 37.1% were non-families. 33.2% of all households were made up of individuals, and 19.0% had someone living alone who was 65 years of age or older. The average household size was 2.22 and the average family size was 2.74.

In the city, the population was spread out, with 24.8% under the age of 18, 7.5% from 18 to 24, 26.3% from 25 to 44, 21.5% from 45 to 64, and 20.0% who were 65 years of age or older. The median age was 38 years. For every 100 females, there were 95.7 males. For every 100 females age 18 and over, there were 88.5 males.

The median income for a household in the city was $31,771, and the median income for a family was $34,896. Males had a median income of $31,250 versus $25,227 for females. The per capita income for the city was $15,381. About 15.7% of families and 14.2% of the population were below the poverty line, including 17.6% of those under age 18 and 12.8% of those age 65 or over.

== Education ==
A portion of New Market is within the Bedford Community School District, while another portion is in the Clarinda Community School District.

It was a part of the New Market Community School District until July 1, 2008, when the district was dissolved and absorbed by four other school districts, including Bedford and Clarinda.

== Notable people ==
- Ora Smith, Illinois politician and farmer, was born in New Market.

== See also ==
- List of sundown towns in the United States
