= Bedford High School (Iowa) =

High School in Iowa, U.S.

Location
- 906 Pennsylvania St., P.O. Box 234; Bedford, Iowa 50833; United States
- 40.6709°N 94.7232°W

Information
- Type: Public High School
- Established: 1880
- School district: Bedford Community Schools
- Superintendent: Jason Shaffer
- NCES School ID: 190456000120
- Principal: Michael Irvin
- Teaching staff: 22.02 (FTE)
- Grades: 6–12
- Enrollment: 245 (2024-2025)
- Student to teacher ratio: 11.13
- Campus type: Rural, remote
- Colors: Navy and White
- Mascot: Bulldogs and Lady Bulldogs
- Yearbook: Torch
- Website: secondary.bedford.k12.ia.us

Bedford High School is a rural public high school located in Bedford, Iowa, United States. It is one of two high schools in Taylor County. A majority of the student population comes from the towns of Bedford, Blockton, Gravity, Conway, and New Market while some students open enroll from neighboring districts in the area. The school's enrollment is approximately 135 students (9–12) and is administered by the Bedford Community School District. Its official mascot is the Bulldog, and its official colors are Navy and White.

== Academics ==
Bedford offers a wide variety of courses for students to choose from. They also allow students to take college courses through Iowa Western Community College in Clarinda, Iowa. Many students choose to further their educations at various colleges in the United States, while some students choose to enter military service, or the workforce following graduation. Currently, 26.66 credits (plus 1 credit of Physical Education) are required for a student to receive their diploma at graduation.

== Sports ==
The Bedford Bulldogs and Lady Bulldogs compete in the Pride of Iowa Conference in Class 1A in most sports. (Class 8-Player in Football and shares wrestling with Lenox High School.

=== State championships ===
The Bulldogs were the 1992 Class A Football State Champions.

Boys' 2023 State Track & Field Wheelchair Champions

== Activities ==
Bedford students have a variety of extracurricular activities and organizations they can also participate in. Some of the activities a student may participate in include. (Not a complete list) FFA- (Future Farmers of America), FCCLA- (Future Community and Career Leaders of America), SADOBS- (Speech and Drama of Bedford Schools), BPA- (Business Professionals of America), Art Club, Band, Chorus, Cheerleading, Student Government, Academic Bowl, and other various organizations and clubs.

== See also ==
- List of high schools in Iowa
