= Bedford Commercial Historic District =

Historic district in Iowa, United States

- U.S. National Register of Historic Places
- U.S. Historic district
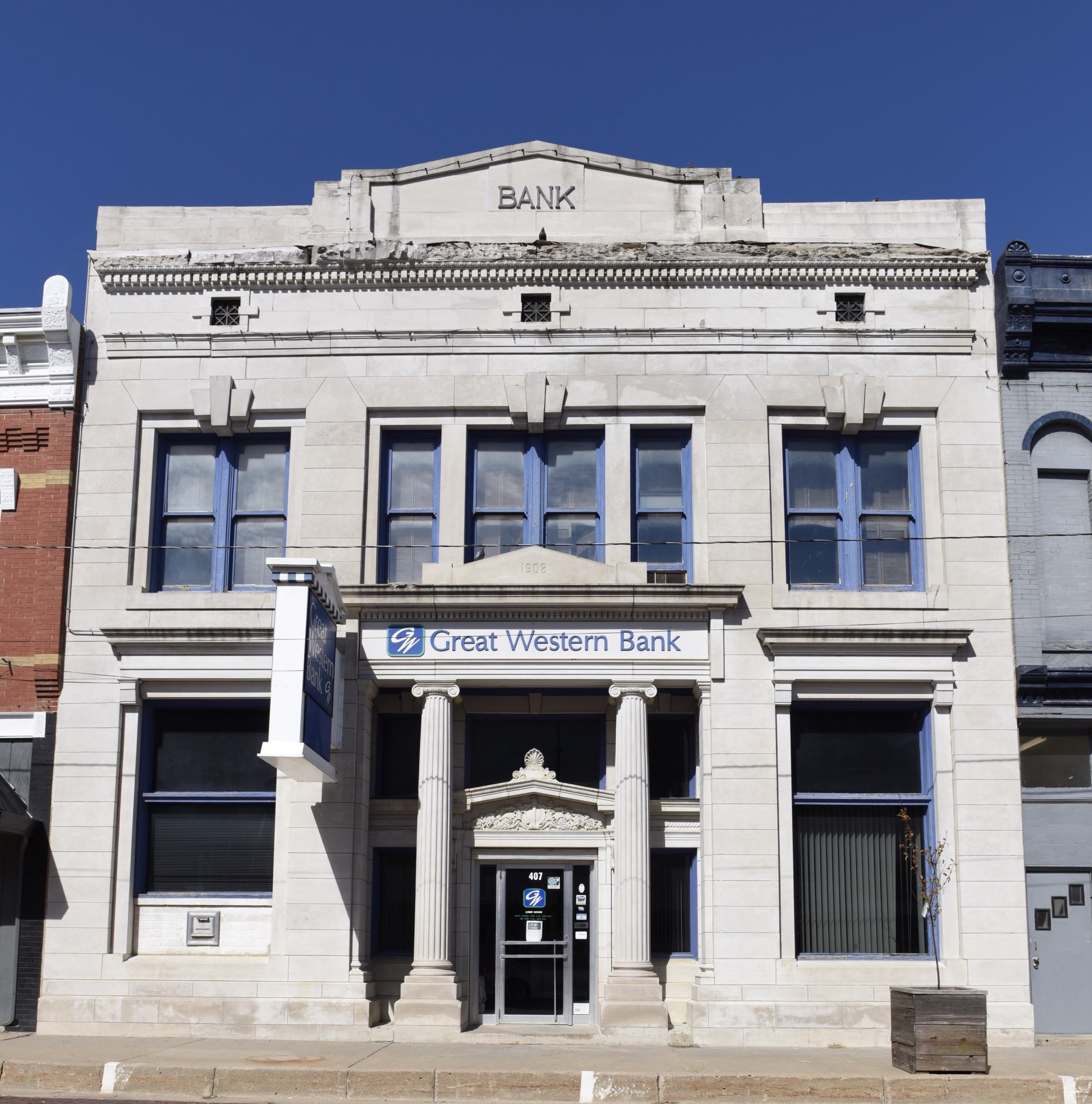
- Bedford National Bank (1908)

- Location within Iowa Location within the United States
- Location: 200-500 blocks of Main St., the 500 and 600 blocks of Court, and the 500 block of Central, Bedford, Iowa
- Coordinates: 40°40′01″N 94°43′07″W
- Area: 11 acres (4.5 ha)
- MPS: Iowa's Main Street Commercial Architecture MPS
- NRHP reference No.: 02001032
- Added to NRHP: September 12, 2002

The Bedford Commercial Historic District encompasses most of the central business district of Bedford, Iowa, United States. It was listed on the National Register of Historic Places in 2002. The historic district includes 50 properties that were part of a 1989 survey of the area. It includes, as contributing properties, 47 buildings and four structures. There are also three buildings that are non-contributing. Bedford House/Garland Hotel (1857, 1877) is a contributing property.

The downtown area originally developed at the intersection of Court and Main Streets, oriented towards the Taylor County Courthouse. After the railroad arrived it started to develop along Main Street, which slopes gradually to the east where the railroad was located. "The Bedford Commercial Historic District is one of the best-preserved collections of brick commercial architecture dating primarily from the late nineteenth century and is a standout, in that regard, in comparison with similar communities in age and size in Iowa."
