= Lulu Johnson =

Lulu Johnson may refer to:

- Lulu Johnson (historian)
- Lulu Johnson (politician)
