= Bedford House =

Bedford House or Bedford Estate may refer to:

- Bedford House (Strand), the London home of the Russell family, Earls of Bedford
- Bedford House (Bedford, Iowa), a historic hotel in Bedford, Iowa, U.S.
- Bedford Estate, an estate in central London, England
