= Taylor County Courthouse =

Taylor County Courthouse may refer to:

- Taylor County Courthouse (Georgia), Butler, Georgia
- Taylor County Courthouse (Iowa), Bedford, Iowa
- Taylor County Courthouse (Wisconsin), Medford, Wisconsin
