= Lenox Round Barn =

- U.S. National Register of Historic Places
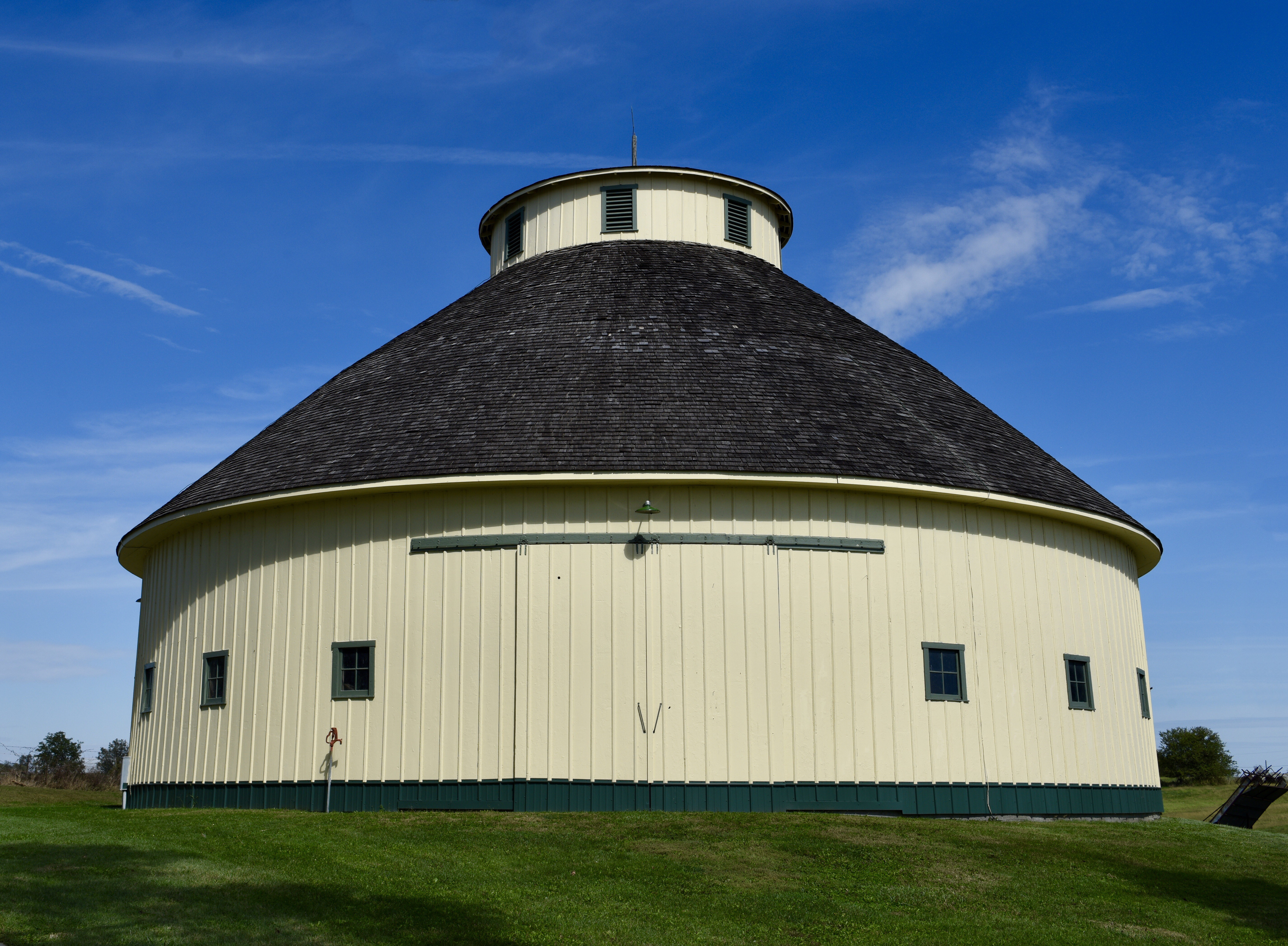

- Location within Iowa Location within the United States
- Location: 1001 Pollock Blvd. Bedford, Iowa
- Coordinates: 40°40′39″N 94°43′45″W
- Area: less than one acre
- Built: 1905; 121 years ago
- MPS: Iowa Round Barns: The Sixty Year Experiment TR
- NRHP reference No.: 99000490
- Added to NRHP: May 5, 1999

The Lenox Round Barn is a historic building that is part of the Taylor County Historical Museum in Bedford, Iowa, United States. The true round barn was built somewhere between 1905 and 1907. The building measures 64 feet (20 m) in diameter and 55 feet (17 m) in height. It features white vertical siding, a large cupola, and a two-pitch roof. The barn was thought to have been designed and built by J.E. Cameron on his farm 5 miles (8.0 km) south of Lenox.

It remained on the family's farm until 1996 when they donated it to the Taylor County Historical Society. The barn was moved to their museum grounds in May 1998. It has been listed on the National Register of Historic Places since 1999. Its primary significance is its architectural value. Of primary interest are the steep-pitched free-standing roof, the tornado-resistant support beams, and the pie-shaped circular grain bins.
