= Gravity, Iowa =

- City
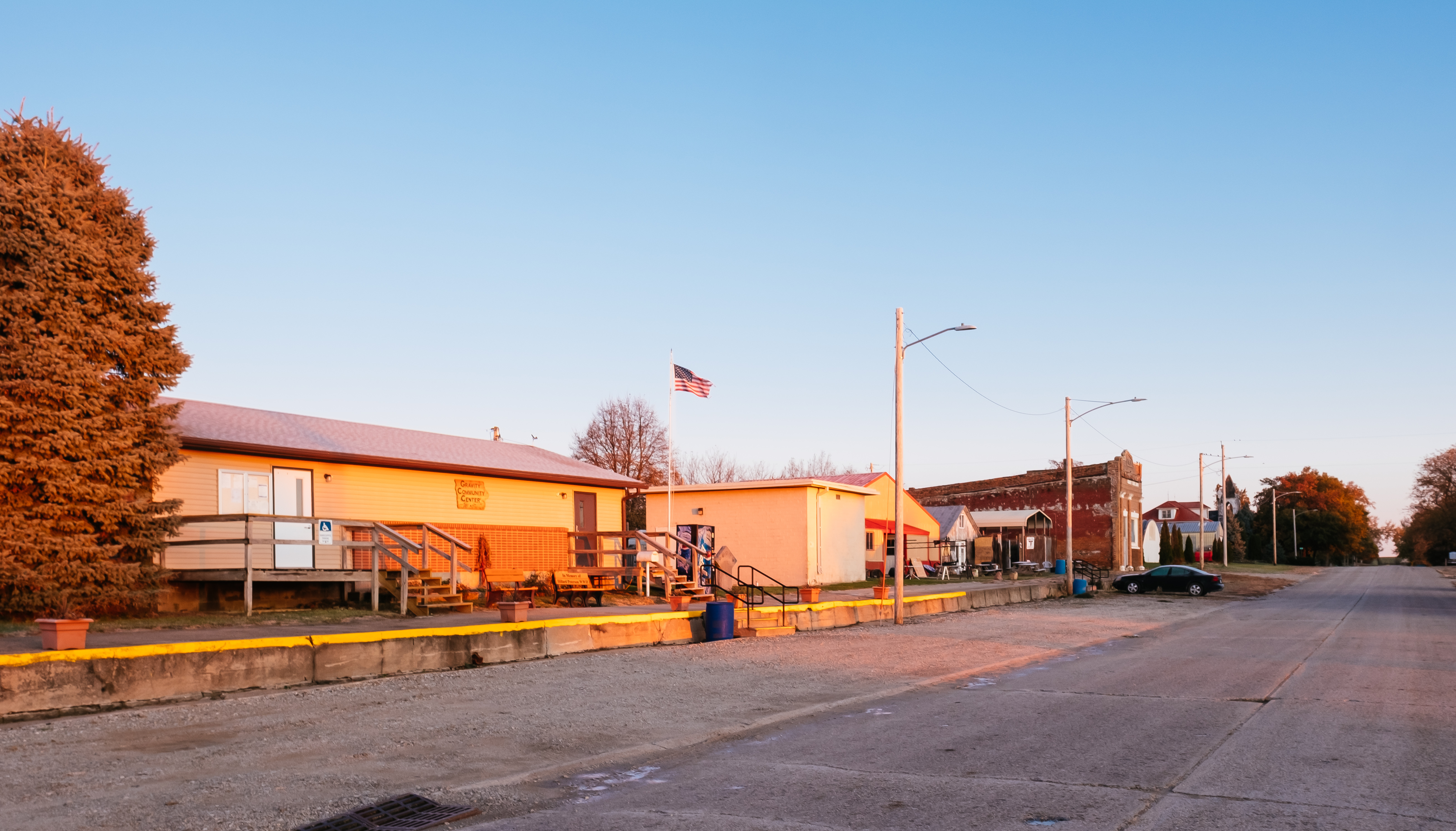
- Main Street in Gravity

- Location of Gravity, Iowa
- Coordinates: 40°45′39″N 94°44′37″W
- Country: USA
- State: Iowa
- County: Taylor

Area
  - Total: 0.34 sq mi (0.87 km^{2})
  - Land: 0.34 sq mi (0.87 km^{2})
  - Water: 0 sq mi (0.00 km^{2})
- Elevation: 1,207 ft (368 m)

Population (2020)
  - Total: 154
  - Density: 458.4/sq mi (176.97/km^{2})
- Time zone: UTC-6 (Central (CST))
  - Summer (DST): UTC-5 (CDT)
- ZIP code: 50848
- Area code: 712
- FIPS code: 19-32520
- GNIS feature ID: 2394968

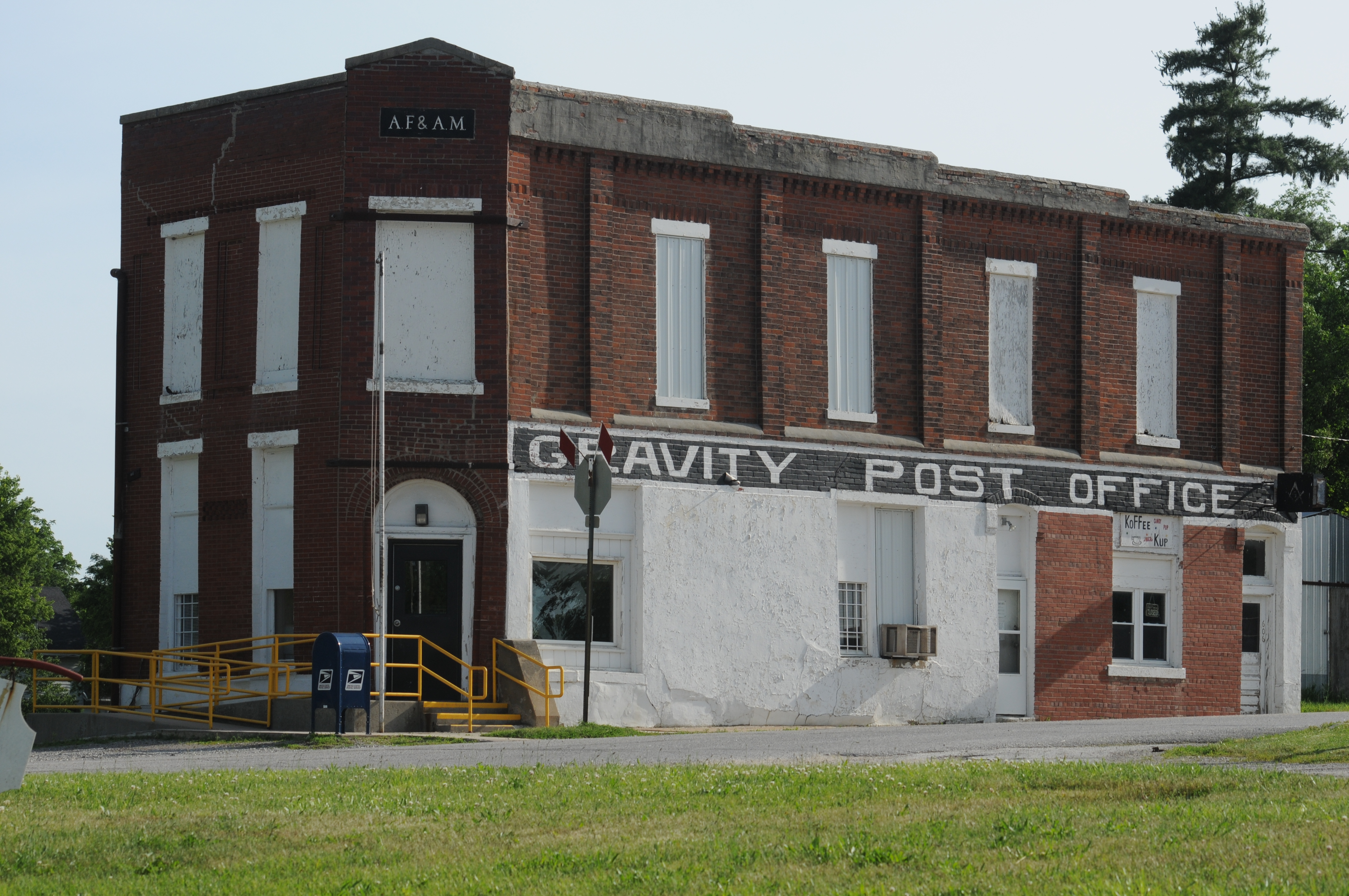
Gravity, Iowa Post Office

Gravity is a city in Taylor County, Iowa, United States. The population was 154 at the time of the 2020 census.

== History ==
Gravity got its start in the year 1881, following the construction of the railroad through the territory. It was incorporated in 1883. The origin of the name "Gravity" is obscure.

== Geography ==
Gravity is located along the Middle Fork One Hundred and Two River.

According to the United States Census Bureau, the city has a total area of 0.30 square miles (0.78 km^{2}), all land.

Gravity is located north of Bedford on Iowa Highway 148.

== Demographics ==
Historical populations
Year	Pop.	±%
1890	210	—
1900	549	+161.4%
1910	475	−13.5%
1920	464	−2.3%
1930	465	+0.2%
1940	514	+10.5%
1950	369	−28.2%
1960	275	−25.5%
1970	286	+4.0%
1980	245	−14.3%
1990	218	−11.0%
2000	218	+0.0%
2010	188	−13.8%
2020	154	−18.1%
Source:"U.S. Census website". United States Census Bureau. and Iowa Data Center; Source: U.S. Decennial Census

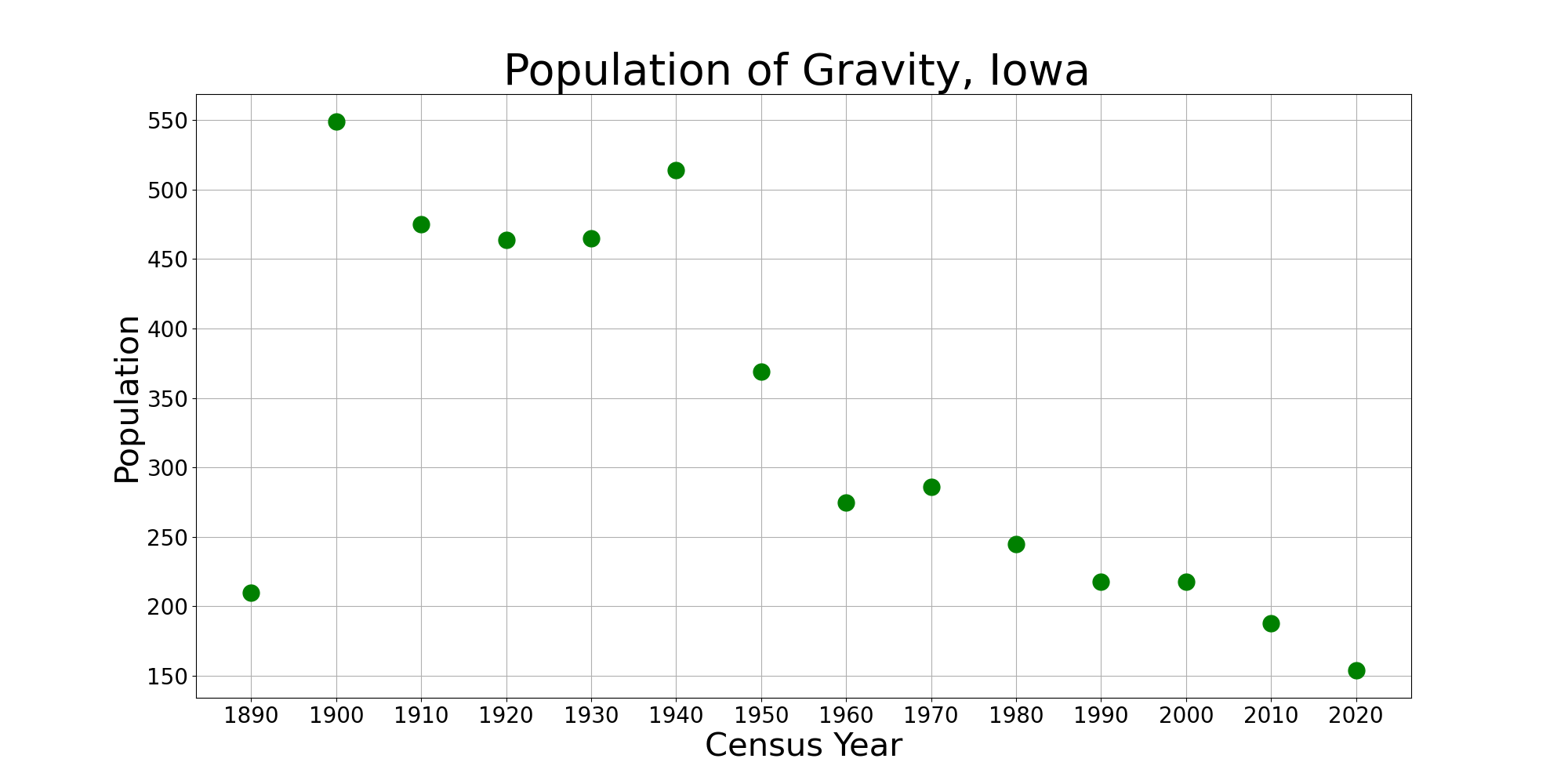
The population of Gravity, Iowa from US census data

=== 2020 census ===
As of the census of 2020, there were 154 people, 64 households, and 43 families residing in the city. The population density was 458.3 inhabitants per square mile (177.0/km^{2}). There were 90 housing units at an average density of 267.9 per square mile (103.4/km^{2}). The racial makeup of the city was 92.2% White, 0.0% Black or African American, 5.8% Native American, 0.0% Asian, 0.0% Pacific Islander, 0.0% from other races and 1.9% from two or more races. Hispanic or Latino persons of any race comprised 0.6% of the population.

Of the 64 households, 20.3% of which had children under the age of 18 living with them, 48.4% were married couples living together, 10.9% were cohabitating couples, 10.9% had a female householder with no spouse or partner present and 29.7% had a male householder with no spouse or partner present. 32.8% of all households were non-families. 26.6% of all households were made up of individuals, 4.7% had someone living alone who was 65 years old or older.

The median age in the city was 45.0 years. 19.5% of the residents were under the age of 20; 4.5% were between the ages of 20 and 24; 26.0% were from 25 and 44; 31.8% were from 45 and 64; and 18.2% were 65 years of age or older. The gender makeup of the city was 60.4% male and 39.6% female.

=== 2010 census ===
As of the census of 2010, there were 188 people, 82 households, and 53 families living in the city. The population density was 626.7 inhabitants per square mile (242.0/km^{2}). There were 103 housing units at an average density of 343.3 per square mile (132.5/km^{2}). The racial makeup of the city was 99.5% White and 0.5% from other races. Hispanic or Latino of any race were 1.1% of the population.

There were 82 households, of which 28.0% had children under the age of 18 living with them, 50.0% were married couples living together, 11.0% had a female householder with no husband present, 3.7% had a male householder with no wife present, and 35.4% were non-families. 28.0% of all households were made up of individuals, and 9.8% had someone living alone who was 65 years of age or older. The average household size was 2.29 and the average family size was 2.68.

The median age in the city was 42 years. 20.2% of residents were under the age of 18; 4.3% were between the ages of 18 and 24; 28.8% were from 25 to 44; 29.2% were from 45 to 64; and 17.6% were 65 years of age or older. The gender makeup of the city was 53.7% male and 46.3% female.

=== 2000 census ===
As of the census of 2000, there were 218 people, 85 households, and 64 families living in the city. The population density was 729.6 inhabitants per square mile (281.7/km^{2}). There were 103 housing units at an average density of 344.7 per square mile (133.1/km^{2}). The racial makeup of the city was 99.08% White, 0.46% Pacific Islander, 0.46% from other races. Hispanic or Latino of any race were 3.21% of the population.

There were 85 households, out of which 29.4% had children under the age of 18 living with them, 60.0% were married couples living together, 11.8% had a female householder with no husband present, and 24.7% were non-families. 22.4% of all households were made up of individuals, and 11.8% had someone living alone who was 65 years of age or older. The average household size was 2.56 and the average family size was 2.98.

In the city, the population was spread out, with 28.0% under the age of 18, 5.0% from 18 to 24, 27.1% from 25 to 44, 20.6% from 45 to 64, and 19.3% who were 65 years of age or older. The median age was 38 years. For every 100 females, there were 111.7 males. For every 100 females age 18 and over, there were 98.7 males.

The median income for a household in the city was $25,000, and the median income for a family was $30,000. Males had a median income of $25,625 versus $20,536 for females. The per capita income for the city was $13,312. About 16.2% of families and 18.1% of the population were below the poverty line, including 11.8% of those under the age of eighteen and 5.4% of those 65 or over.

== Education ==
Gravity is within the Bedford Community School District.

== Notable people ==
- Lulu Johnson (1907–1995), historian and the second African-American to earn a Ph.D. in the United States.
- Bob King (1923–2004) head basketball coach at Indiana State University and University of New Mexico.
- Roberta Linn (1931-), singer
