= Bedford Community School District =

Public school district in Bedford, Iowa, United States

Coordinates: 41.662855°N 92.018800°W

Location
- Bedford, Iowa Taylor, Ringgold, and Page counties United States
- Coordinates: 41.662855, -92.018800

District information
- Type: Local school district
- Grades: K-12
- Superintendent: Jason Shaffer
- Schools: 2
- Budget: $8,512,000 (2020-21)
- NCES District ID: 1904560

Students and staff
- Students: 535 (2022-23)
- Teachers: 41.78 FTE
- Staff: 41.13 FTE
- Student–teacher ratio: 12.81
- Athletic conference: Pride of Iowa

Other information
- Website: www.bedford.k12.ia.us

Bedford Community School District is a rural public school district headquartered in Bedford, Iowa. The district operates Bedford Elementary School and Bedford High School.

It is mostly in Taylor County with portions in Ringgold and Page counties. Communities served include Bedford, Blockton, Conway, Gravity, and a portion of New Market. It also includes the Athelstan census-designated place.

On July 1, 2008, the district absorbed portions of the former New Market Community School District. When the Clearfield Community School District closed on July 1, 2014, the Bedford district absorbed a portion of it.

== Schools ==
The district operates two schools in a single facility in Bedford.

- Bedford Elementary School
- Bedford High School

== See also ==
- List of school districts in Iowa
