= Lake of Three Fires State Park =

State park in Iowa, United States

- Location within Iowa Location within the United States
- Location: Taylor County, Iowa, United States
- Nearest city: Bedford, Iowa
- Coordinates: 40°42′49″N 94°41′25″W
- Area: 1,155 acres (467 ha)
- Elevation: 1,142 ft (348 m)
- Established: 1935
- Administrator: Iowa Department of Natural Resources
- Website: Official website

Lake of Three Fires State Park is a 1,155-acre (467 ha) state park in Taylor County, Iowa, United States, located 4.3 miles northeast of the city center of Bedford. The park is centered on the eponymous 85-acre (34 ha) Lake of Three Fires. It was established in 1935 and named for a Potawatomi group that once lived there.

The lake features a beach area with a playground, two boat ramps, and several fishing jetties. Fish species in the lake include bluegill, bullhead, and crappie. The park's camping facilities include two campgrounds with electric and non-electric sites, an additional equestrian campground with horse pens, and six cabins. The park has 10 miles (16 km) of multi-use trails which are popular for hiking and horseback riding.
