= Eldon Stroburg =

American politician (1927–2026)

Member of the Iowa House of Representatives
- In office 1969–1971

Personal details
- Born: November 4, 1927 Blockton, Iowa, U.S.
- Died: November 12, 2026 (aged 99)
- Party: Democratic
- Occupation: Farmer

Eldon Leonard Stroburg (November 4, 1927 – November 12, 2026) was an American politician in the state of Iowa.

== Life and career ==
Stroburg was born in Blockton, Iowa, on November 4, 1927. He attended Northwest Missouri State University and was a farmer. Stroburg served in the Iowa House of Representatives from 1969 to 1971 as a Democrat. He died on November 12, 2026, at the age of 99.
