= Bedford House (Bedford, Iowa) =

- U.S. National Register of Historic Places
- U.S. Historic district – Contributing property
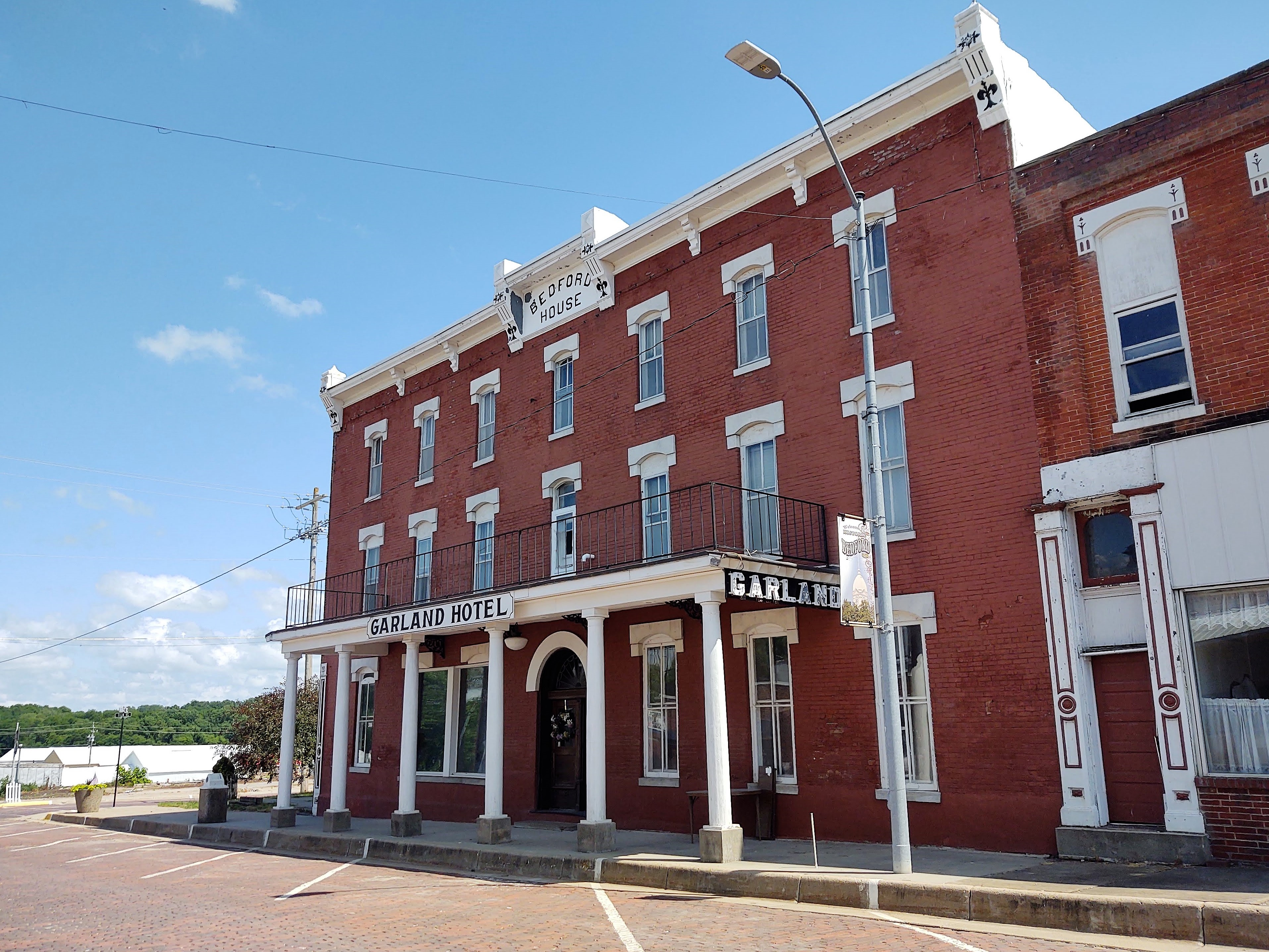

- Location within Iowa Location within the United States
- Location: 306 Main St. Bedford, Iowa
- Coordinates: 40°40′0″N 94°43′05″W
- Area: less than one acre
- Built: 1857
- Part of: Bedford Commercial Historic District (ID02001032)
- NRHP reference No.: 77000560
- Added to NRHP: June 14, 1977

Bedford House, also known as the Garland Hotel, is a historic building located in Bedford, Iowa, United States. It was built in three stages. The first section was completed in 1857. Additions were completed in 1877 and 1910. Charles Steele, a local businessman, farmer, and banker, had the structure built and was its first owner. The original hotel was used as a stage coach depot until the railroad came to Bedford in 1872. It suffered some damage in a fire that destroyed five other commercial buildings in 1877. Until 1880 the building also housed a jail in the cement fruit cellar. The hotel was renamed the Hotel Garland by its new owner John Clark in 1906. The building was listed on the National Register of Historic Places in 1977. It was included as a contributing property in the Bedford Commercial Historic District in 2002.

The hotel closed in 1997 after it served an estimated 150,000 guests. The building started to fall into disrepair. The 1910 addition collapsed in 2004, which almost led to the building being torn down. Instead it led to a community effort to save the building.

The 1877 addition, built by Willard Barrows who owned the hotel at the time, fronts the building on Main Street. The three-story brick structure features a symmetrical, a seven bay facade, with a door in the center bay and five-bay wooden porch. The cornice across the front is pressed-tin supported by brackets. It also possesses a central, protruding panel, and a low balustrade.
