= Conway, Iowa =

- unincorporated community
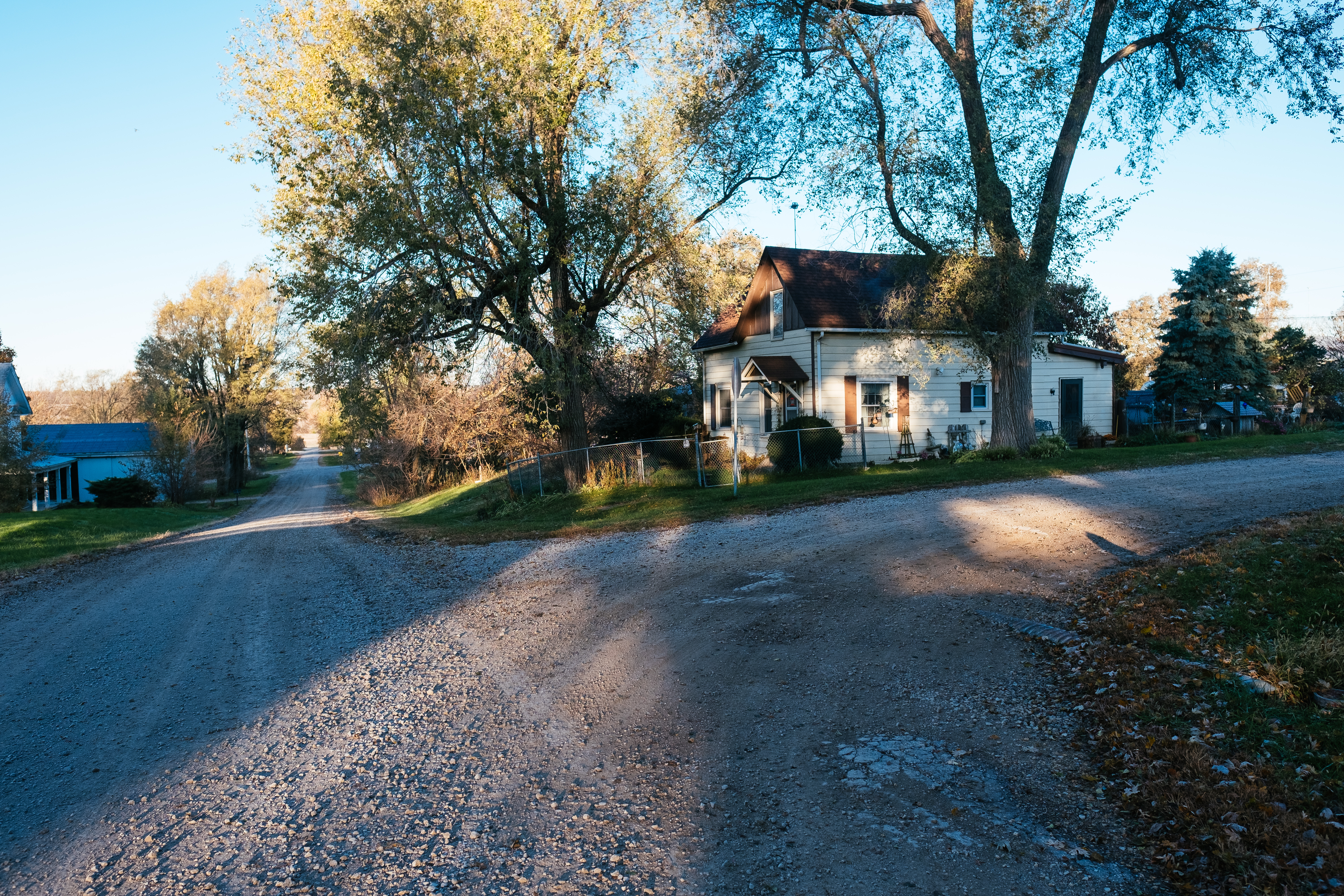
- Looking west on the corner of 4th and South Street

- Location of Conway, Iowa
- Coordinates: 40°44′57″N 94°37′20″W
- Country: United States
- State: Iowa
- County: Taylor

Area
  - Total: 0.22 sq mi (0.57 km^{2})
  - Land: 0.22 sq mi (0.57 km^{2})
  - Water: 0 sq mi (0.00 km^{2})
- Elevation: 1,198 ft (365 m)

Population (2020)
  - Total: 17
  - Density: 77.0/sq mi (29.72/km^{2})
- Time zone: UTC-6 (Central (CST))
  - Summer (DST): UTC-5 (CDT)
- ZIP code: 50833
- Area code: 712
- FIPS code: 19-15960
- GNIS feature ID: 2393622

Conway is an unincorporated community and former city in Taylor County, Iowa, United States. The population was 17 at the 2020 census, making it the third smallest incorporated place in Iowa.

== History ==
Conway was a planned town laid out with the name "Harmony" in 1872 by Josiah Litteer, a company agent for the Burlington and Missouri River Railroad, which was acquired later that year by the Chicago, Burlington and Quincy Railroad. Intended to be a hub for Taylor County, it became an important rail center. Within a year, there were almost 300 residents, and the town had lumberyards, a general store, druggists, and tradesmen. and O.B. Hyde built the first residence. That same year, Reverend Jeremiah Hughes preached the first sermon in the town. In 1875, pioneer Simeon Wright instituted the Right Angle Lodge No. 344, a flourishing Masonic lodge with 50 members. Early, there was a section of Conway called "Stumptown" for its squat, little houses.

A public library was built in 1873 with local tax dollars and a donation from Senator William B. Allison of Iowa. The Conway school opened in 1875 in a two-story building. The town was incorporated with the name Conway in 1878, and O. J. Eoff served as its first mayor. A new school was built in 1916. Around that time, the town had "its own privately-owned electric plant, its own telephone exchange and its own lumber and coal yards." Eventually, the electricity service was absorbed into a large utility company, the telephone service merged, and the coal business became defunct. The school consolidated, first becoming a junior high school for the Bedford School District, then closing permanently.

Conway's population peaked at just over 400 in 1880. That year, the Conway Christian Church congregation erected a new two-thousand-dollar house of worship. The next year, in the summer of 1881, Conway’s prized flour mill burned down early one morning under mysterious circumstances. The town was also home to a Presbyterian church, and the Conway Methodist Church from the 1880s through the 1980s. A bell from this church in now a monument in Oklahoma. When the original church building burned in 1919, it was moved to the L.E. Phillips Ranch. Today, it is an official Oklahoma Historical Marker on the grounds of the Woolaroc Museum and Preserve in Osage County meant to honor the roots of the Phillips family in Conway.

Frank Phillips, founder of the Phillips 66 gasoline empire lived in Conway, and his brother, noted businessman and philanthropist Waite Phillips was born in 1883 in Conway.

In September 1892, a "fire destroyed nineteen buildings causing a total loss of $50,000." The next year, in 1893, another fire was reported that burned two dry goods stores, two grocery stores, a drug store, business offices, the post office, and two livery stables, "in all sixteen buildings," costing about $40,000. In 1919, a large fire demolished the original Methodist church. It was rebuilt soon afterwards.

In 1925, the Omaha Bee wrote a page-long feature including photographs about a group of men from the town who held an annual reunion in nearby Omaha, where many of them worked. The successful businessmen had been meeting annually since the 1890s in order to stay connected. In 1941, Dale Carnegie featured the town in one of his syndicated national columns, writing about how farmers would drive to the town from miles around to attend the Fourth of July celebration.

A tornado struck the town in May 1957, which damaged a few buildings. In early 1971, the town had a cafe/tavern, a grocery store and filling station, and several salvage yards filled with cars. However, a severe tornado hit in May 1971, which damaged nearly every structure (forty out of forty-five) in the town. The village had 91 residents, with the tornado "completely demolishing eight homes and buildings, and injuring twelve persons, none seriously." However, after that event, the first-ever dedicated water system was built for the town and there were prospects for a resurgence. The town was home to a popular bar then called the Last Chance Dry Gulch Saloon. From the 1950s through the 1970s, the town of Conway was often featured in folksy articles written by John M. Chilcote (1905-1983), editor of the St. Joseph News-Press. Chilcote's father, J.H. Chilcote (1868-1954), started a newspaper called the Conway Reporter. Other newspapers in the town included the Conway Journal (1890-1907) and the Conway Record (1903-1919).

In the 1990s, the local park was named W.D. Eighmy Park in memory of Wendall Delos Eighmy (1915-1990).

By the 2020 census, Conway's population declined to 17, becoming Iowa's third smallest incorporated place. In mid February 2026, the city of Conway decided to move to unincorporate and have its government issues go to the county. Two months later in April 2026, Conway became an unincorporated community.

Located south of the former city is the Bowers Cemetery, an 1870s burial site with more than 80 graves. It is located in the Clayton Township.

== Geography ==
Conway is located along the East Fork of the One Hundred and Two River.

According to the United States Census Bureau, the city has a total area of 0.22 square miles (0.57 km^{2}), all land.

== Demographics ==
Historical populations
Year	Pop.	±%
1880	423	—
1890	379	−10.4%
1900	348	−8.2%
1910	283	−18.7%
1920	253	−10.6%
1930	266	+5.1%
1940	246	−7.5%
1950	168	−31.7%
1960	82	−51.2%
1970	91	+11.0%
1980	93	+2.2%
1990	57	−38.7%
2000	63	+10.5%
2010	41	−34.9%
2020	17	−58.5%
Source:"U.S. Census website". United States Census Bureau. and Iowa Data Center; Source: U.S. Decennial Census

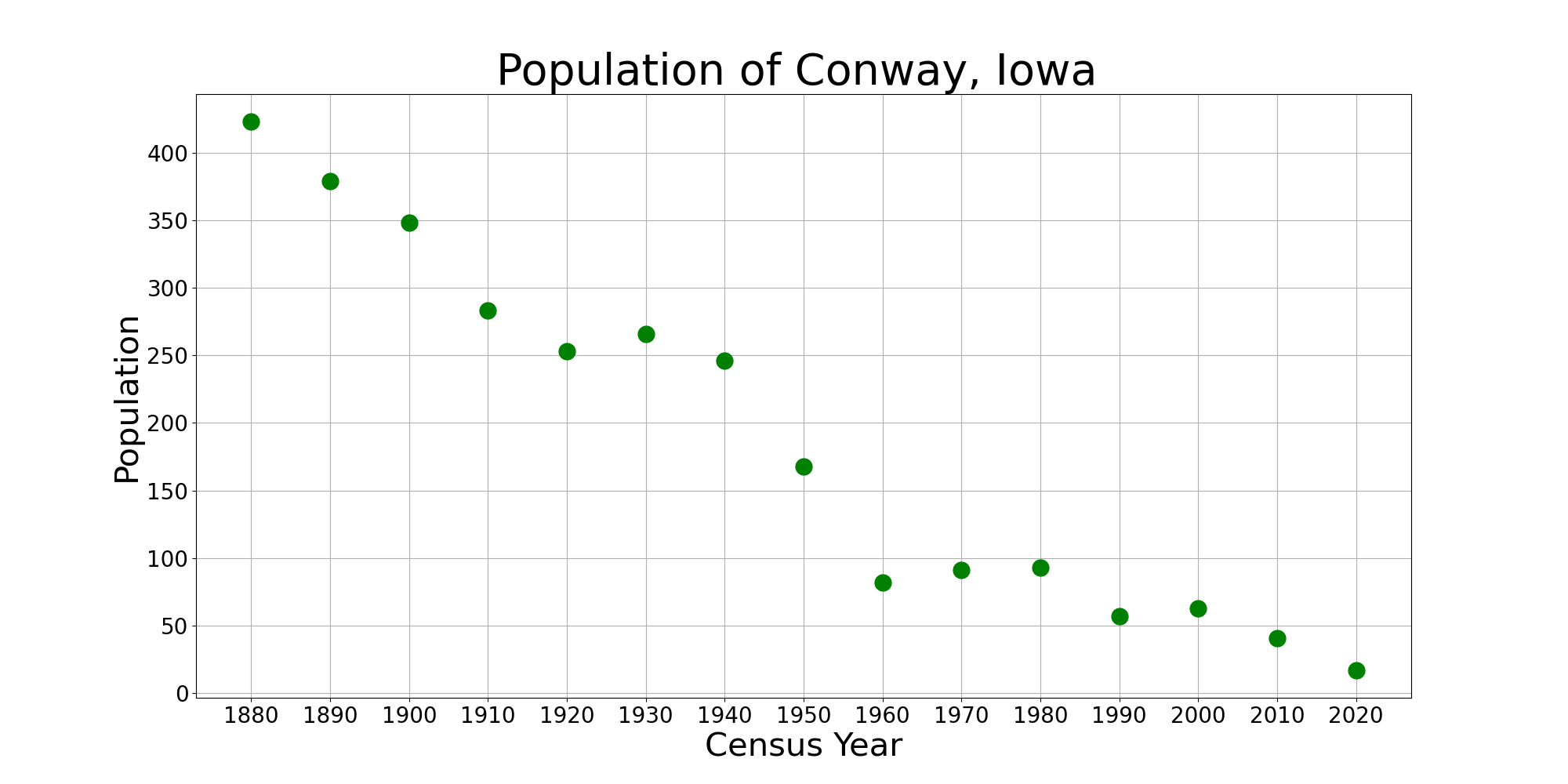
The population of Conway, Iowa from US census data

=== 2020 census ===
As of the census of 2020, there were 17 people, 13 households, and 10 families residing in the city. The population density was 77.0 inhabitants per square mile (29.7/km^{2}). There were 17 housing units at an average density of 77.0 per square mile (29.7/km^{2}). The racial makeup of the city was 94.1% White, 0.0% Black or African American, 0.0% Native American, 0.0% Asian, 0.0% Pacific Islander, 0.0% from other races and 5.9% from two or more races. Hispanic or Latino persons of any race comprised 0.0% of the population.

Of the 13 households, 46.2% of which had children under the age of 18 living with them, 46.2% were married couples living together, 7.7% were cohabitating couples, 46.2% had a female householder with no spouse or partner present and 0.0% had a male householder with no spouse or partner present. 23.1% of all households were non-families. 23.1% of all households were made up of individuals, 7.7% had someone living alone who was 65 years old or older.

The median age in the city was 62.5 years. 17.6% of the residents were under the age of 20; 5.9% were between the ages of 20 and 24; 5.9% were from 25 and 44; 23.5% were from 45 and 64; and 47.1% were 65 years of age or older. The gender makeup of the city was 29.4% male and 70.6% female.

=== 2010 census ===
As of the census of 2010, there were 41 people, 16 households, and 9 families residing in the city. The population density was 186.4 inhabitants per square mile (72.0/km^{2}). There were 24 housing units at an average density of 109.1 per square mile (42.1/km^{2}). The racial makeup of the city was 100.0% White.

There were 16 households, of which 31.3% had children under the age of 18 living with them, 43.8% were married couples living together, 6.3% had a female householder with no husband present, 6.3% had a male householder with no wife present, and 43.8% were non-families. 18.8% of all households were made up of individuals, and 12.5% had someone living alone who was 65 years of age or older. The average household size was 2.56 and the average family size was 3.22.

The median age in the city was 39.5 years. 24.4% of residents were under the age of 18; 7.3% were between the ages of 18 and 24; 21.9% were from 25 to 44; 24.4% were from 45 to 64; and 22% were 65 years of age or older. The gender makeup of the city was 56.1% male and 43.9% female.

=== 2000 census ===
As of the census of 2000, there were 63 people, 24 households, and 19 families residing in the city. The population density was 283.6 inhabitants per square mile (109.5/km^{2}). There were 33 housing units at an average density of 148.5 per square mile (57.3/km^{2}). The racial makeup of the city was 100.00% White.

There were 24 households, out of which 33.3% had children under the age of 18 living with them, 62.5% were married couples living together, 12.5% had a female householder with no husband present, and 20.8% were non-families. 12.5% of all households were made up of individuals, and 12.5% had someone living alone who was 65 years of age or older. The average household size was 2.63 and the average family size was 2.89.

In the city, the population was spread out, with 27.0% under the age of 18, 6.3% from 18 to 24, 27.0% from 25 to 44, 23.8% from 45 to 64, and 15.9% who were 65 years of age or older. The median age was 42 years. For every 100 females, there were 65.8 males. For every 100 females age 18 and over, there were 91.7 males.

The median income for a household in the city was $31,250, and the median income for a family was $31,875. Males had a median income of $25,000 versus $26,250 for females. The per capita income for the city was $11,780. There were 38.5% of families and 28.0% of the population living below the poverty line, including 25.0% of under eighteens and 100.0% of those over 64.

== Education ==
Conway is within the Bedford Community School District.

== Notable people ==
- Frank Phillips, Businessman and banker
- L.E. Phillips, Businessman and banker
- Waite Phillips, Businessman and philanthropist
- Mike Welday, baseball player
