= Lulu Johnson (historian) =

American historian and university administrator (1907–1995)

- Born: Lulu Merle Johnson; September 14, 1907; Gravity, Iowa, U.S.
- Died: October 19, 1995 (aged 88); Millsboro, Delaware, U.S.
- Education: University of Iowa (BA, MA, PhD)
- Occupations: Historian, university administrator

Lulu Merle Johnson (September 14, 1907 – October 19, 1995) was an American historian and university administrator. She was the second African-American woman to earn a PhD in history in the United States, and the first to do so in the state of Iowa. P. G. Dagbovie has described Johnson as being part of the "first distinguishable coterie of formally trained black women historians" in the U.S. Johnson County, Iowa, is named in honor of her, officially since September 2020.

== Life and career ==
Lulu Johnson (left) with members of her Sunday School class, Gravity, Iowa, ca. 1920

Lulu Merle Johnson was born in 1907 on a farm near the small town of Gravity in southwestern Iowa; the land had been purchased by her grandfather in 1882. She moved to eastern Iowa in her late teens, and graduated from Clinton High School in 1925. She earned a BA from the University of Iowa, before going on to receive an MA in history in 1930 for a thesis entitled, "The Negro in Canada, Slave and Free." Once she had earned her MA, Johnson taught history and politics at Talladega College (1930–31) and at Tougaloo College (1931–40).

Johnson worked intermittently at the University of Iowa throughout the 1930s on a PhD in history; she also undertook some graduate study at the University of Chicago. She was supervised by Winfred T. Root, chair of the department, and by Harrison John Thornton. In 1941, Johnson successfully defended her doctoral dissertation, "The Problem of Slavery in the Old Northwest, 1787–1858." In doing so, she became the first African-American woman to receive a PhD from the University of Iowa, and the second African-American woman in the United States to earn a doctorate in history after Marion Thompson Wright. While at the University of Iowa, Johnson received funding from the General Education Board of the Rockefeller Foundation to support her doctoral research.

Johnson faced discrimination during her time at the University of Iowa, including being forced to take a swimming class as a requirement of her doctorate, even though she was enrolled in the history PhD program, and was not allowed to use the university swimming pool at the same time as whites.

Johnson went on to teach history at historically black colleges such as Florida A&M University, and West Virginia State College, before she joined the faculty of Cheyney University of Pennsylvania in 1952. There she served as a professor of history and also as dean of women students. A longtime member of Alpha Kappa Alpha sorority, Johnson retired in 1971 to the seaside community of Millsboro, Delaware. She died there in 1995.

== Bibliography ==
- "The Negro in Canada, slave and free". MA Thesis, University of Iowa. 1930.
- "The problem of slavery in the Old Northwest, 1787–1858". PhD Dissertation, University of Iowa. 1941.
- Review of Lay My Burden Down: A Folk History of Slavery, in The Mississippi Valley Historical Review. Vol. 32, No. 4 (March 1946), p. 609
- The Negro in American Life, n.d.
