= Blockton, Iowa =

- City
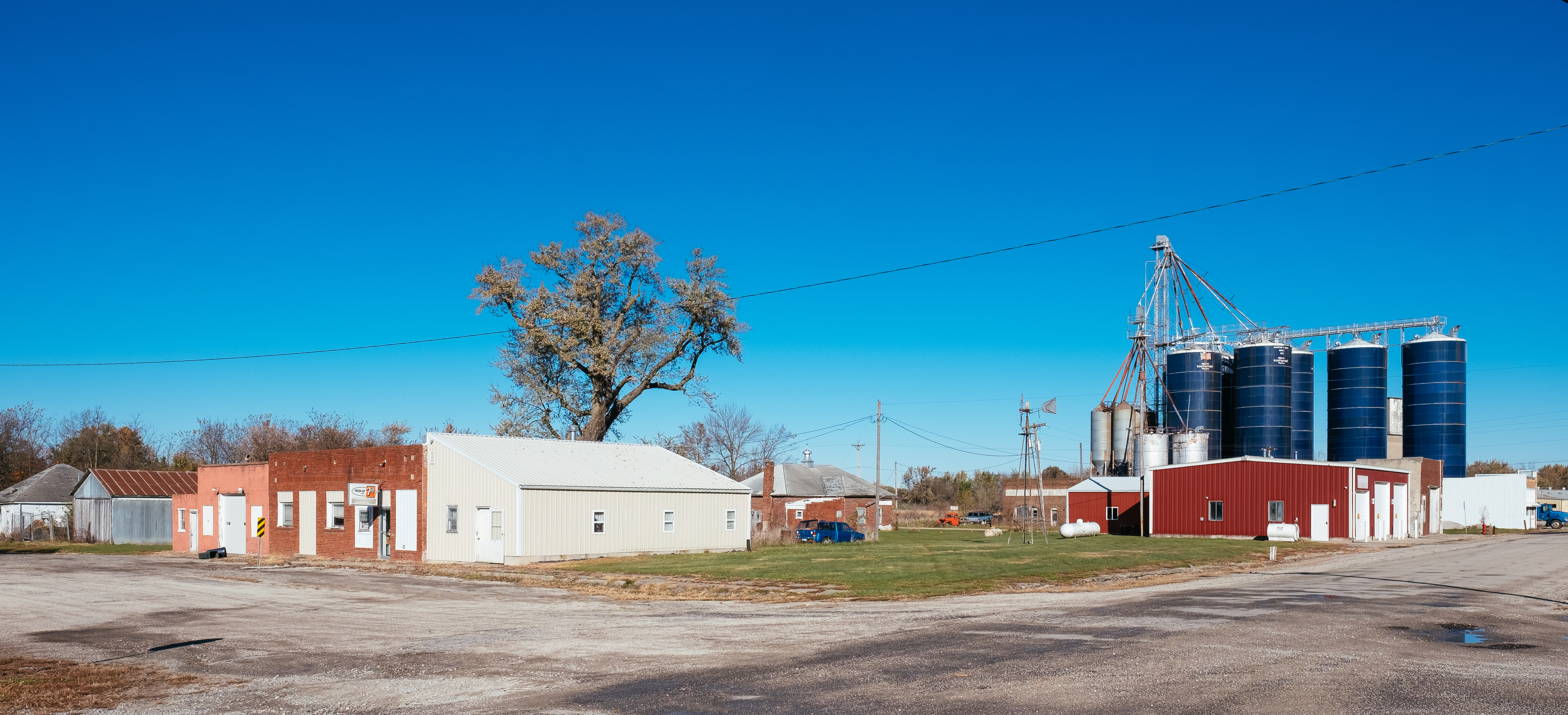
- The corner of King and Division streets

- Location of Blockton, Iowa
- Coordinates: 40°37′15″N 94°28′37″W
- Country: USA
- State: Iowa
- County: Taylor

Area
  - Total: 0.64 sq mi (1.66 km^{2})
  - Land: 0.64 sq mi (1.65 km^{2})
  - Water: 0.0039 sq mi (0.01 km^{2})
- Elevation: 1,119 ft (341 m)

Population (2020)
  - Total: 125
  - Density: 195.9/sq mi (75.64/km^{2})
- Time zone: UTC-6 (Central (CST))
  - Summer (DST): UTC-5 (CDT)
- ZIP code: 50836
- Area code: 641
- FIPS code: 19-06985
- GNIS feature ID: 2394192

Blockton is a city in Taylor County, Iowa, United States. The population was 125 at the 2020 census.

== History ==
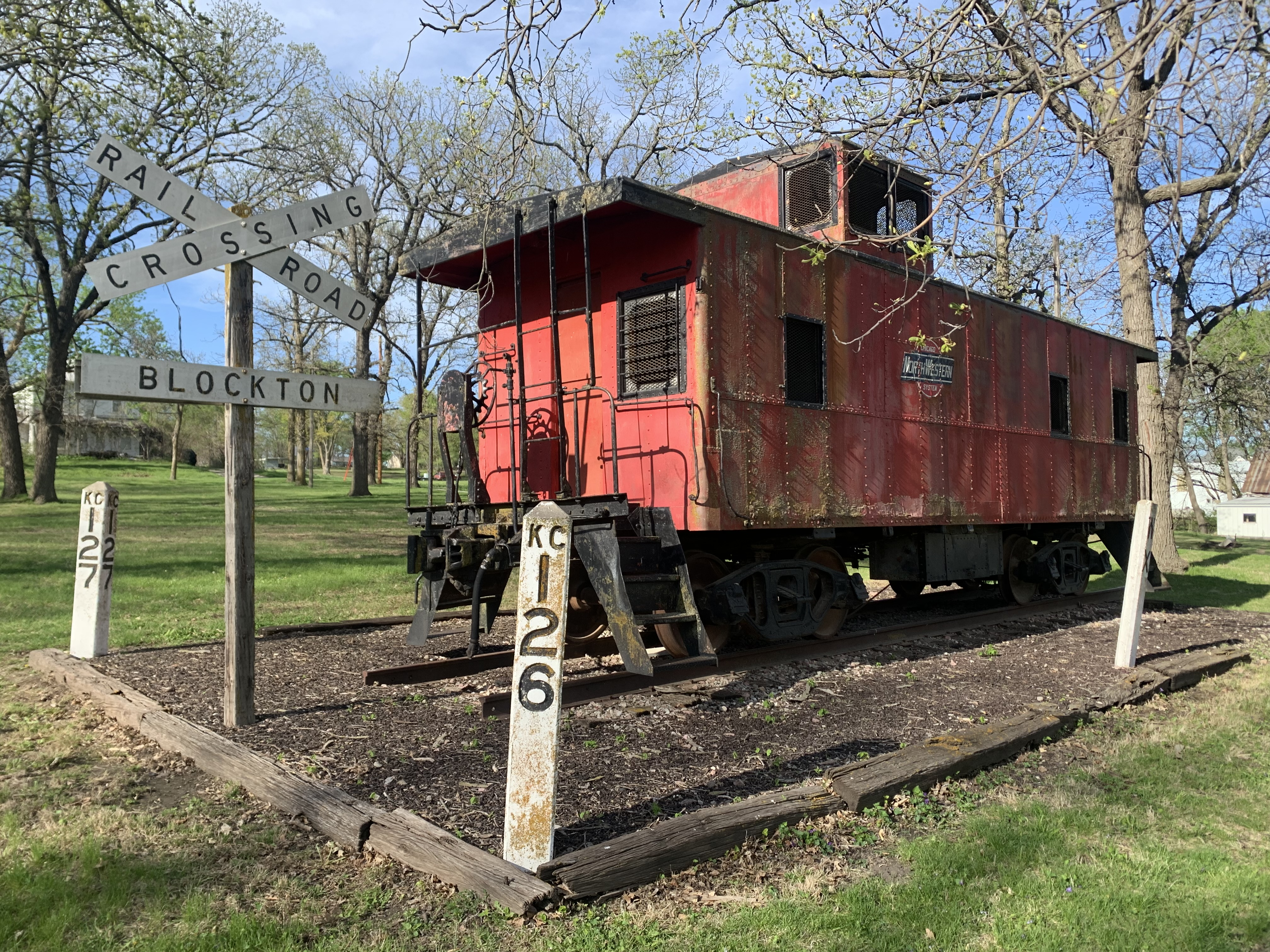
Railcar in Blockton park

Blockton was founded by the Mormons in 1861, and it was originally known as Mormontown. A post office named Mormontown was established in 1872, and the name changed to Blockton in 1887 after the Mormons left the area. The name Blockton came in honor of W. T. Block, a railroad official when the Chicago Great Western Railway was built through the town. It was incorporated in 1891 with a population of 273. The Blockton Public School consolidated with the Bedford Community School District in 1959.

== Geography ==
Blockton is located just east of the Platte River and the Ringgold-Taylor county border is its eastern extent.

According to the United States Census Bureau, the city has a total area of 0.65 square miles (1.68 km^{2}), all land.

== Demographics ==
Historical populations
Year	Pop.	±%
1900	704	—
1910	648	−8.0%
1920	524	−19.1%
1930	537	+2.5%
1940	488	−9.1%
1950	407	−16.6%
1960	343	−15.7%
1970	273	−20.4%
1980	280	+2.6%
1990	213	−23.9%
2000	192	−9.9%
2010	192	+0.0%
2020	125	−34.9%
Source:"U.S. Census website". United States Census Bureau. and Iowa Data Center; Source: U.S. Decennial Census

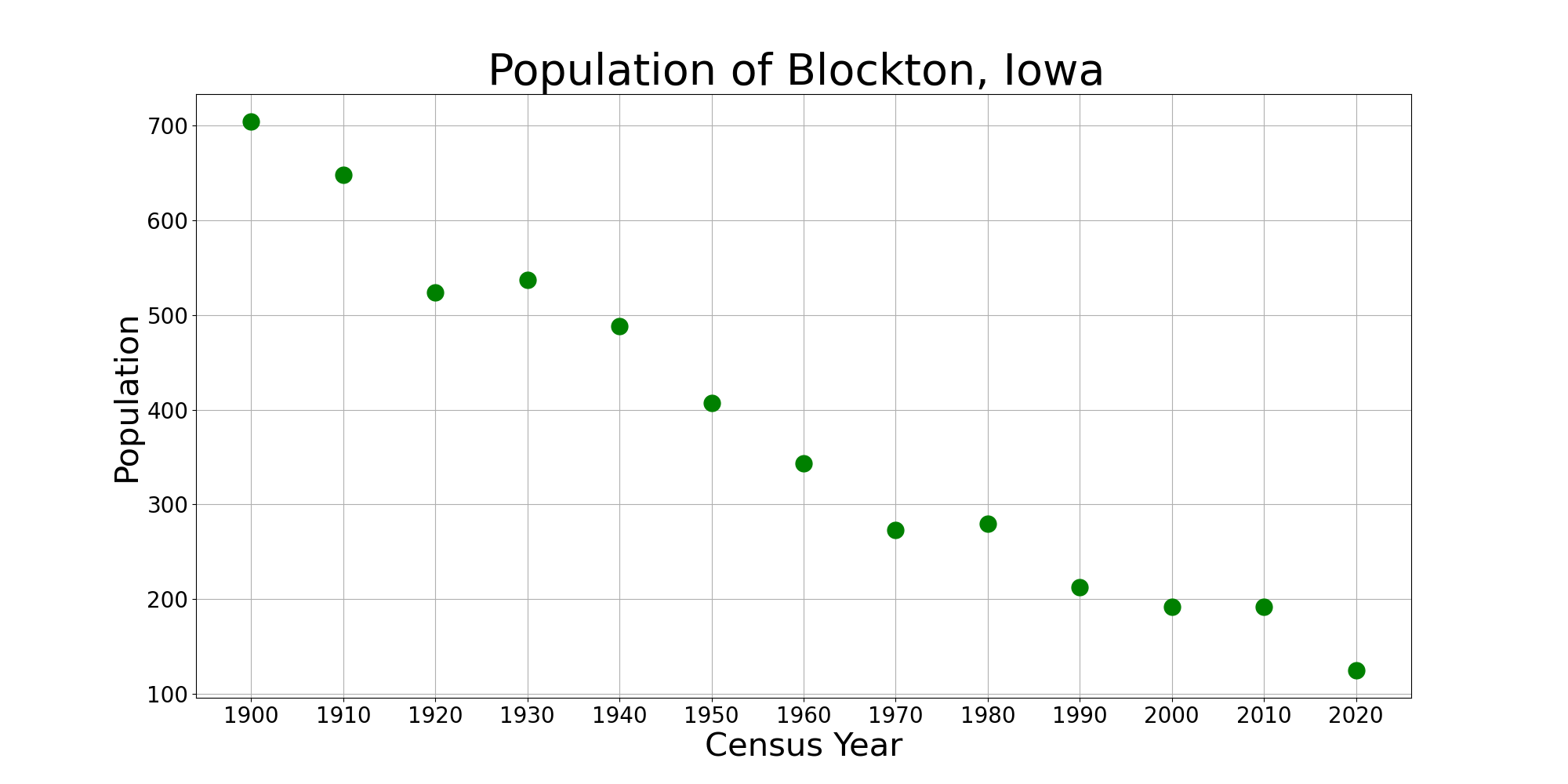
The population of Blockton, Iowa from US census data

=== 2020 census ===
As of the census of 2020, there were 125 people, 74 households, and 33 families residing in the city. The population density was 195.9 inhabitants per square mile (75.6/km^{2}). There were 84 housing units at an average density of 131.7 per square mile (50.8/km^{2}). The racial makeup of the city was 96.0% White, 0.0% Black or African American, 0.0% Native American, 0.0% Asian, 0.8% Pacific Islander, 0.8% from other races and 2.4% from two or more races. Hispanic or Latino persons of any race comprised 2.4% of the population.

Of the 74 households, 24.3% of which had children under the age of 18 living with them, 27.0% were married couples living together, 6.8% were cohabitating couples, 28.4% had a female householder with no spouse or partner present and 37.8% had a male householder with no spouse or partner present. 55.4% of all households were non-families. 48.6% of all households were made up of individuals, 16.2% had someone living alone who was 65 years old or older.

The median age in the city was 55.3 years. 15.2% of the residents were under the age of 20; 5.6% were between the ages of 20 and 24; 20.8% were from 25 and 44; 28.8% were from 45 and 64; and 29.6% were 65 years of age or older. The gender makeup of the city was 58.4% male and 41.6% female.

=== 2010 census ===
At the 2010 census there were 192 people, 86 households, and 53 families living in the city. The population density was 295.4 inhabitants per square mile (114.1/km^{2}). There were 110 housing units at an average density of 169.2 per square mile (65.3/km^{2}). The racial makeup of the city was 99.5% White and 0.5% Native American. Hispanic or Latino of any race were 2.1%.

Of the 86 households 23.3% had children under the age of 18 living with them, 54.7% were married couples living together, 3.5% had a female householder with no husband present, 3.5% had a male householder with no wife present, and 38.4% were non-families. 32.6% of households were one person and 18.6% were one person aged 65 or older. The average household size was 2.23 and the average family size was 2.85.

The median age was 43.7 years. 21.9% of residents were under the age of 18; 7.4% were between the ages of 18 and 24; 21.9% were from 25 to 44; 28.6% were from 45 to 64; and 20.3% were 65 or older. The gender makeup of the city was 54.7% male and 45.3% female.

=== 2000 census ===
At the 2000 census there were 192 people, 91 households, and 52 families living in the city. The population density was 296.7 inhabitants per square mile (114.6/km^{2}). There were 112 housing units at an average density of 173.1 per square mile (66.8/km^{2}). The racial makeup of the city was 98.96% White, and 1.04% from two or more races. Hispanic or Latino of any race were 0.52%.

Of the 91 households 28.6% had children under the age of 18 living with them, 48.4% were married couples living together, 9.9% had a female householder with no husband present, and 41.8% were non-families. 36.3% of households were one person and 24.2% were one person aged 65 or older. The average household size was 2.11 and the average family size was 2.75.

The age distribution was 22.9% under the age of 18, 9.4% from 18 to 24, 25.0% from 25 to 44, 21.4% from 45 to 64, and 21.4% 65 or older. The median age was 40 years. For every 100 females, there were 82.9 males. For every 100 females age 18 and over, there were 82.7 males.

The median household income was $22,917 and the median family income was $28,125. Males had a median income of $25,417 versus $15,000 for females. The per capita income for the city was $15,413. About 12.7% of families and 20.0% of the population were below the poverty line, including 33.9% of those under the age of eighteen and 20.5% of those sixty five or over.

== Education ==
Blockton is within the Bedford Community School District.

== Notable people ==
- Bourke B. Hickenlooper (1896–1971), 29th governor of Iowa and four-term U.S. senator
- Eldon Stroburg (1927–2026), former state representative and farmer
