= Taylor County Courthouse (Iowa) =

- U.S. National Register of Historic Places
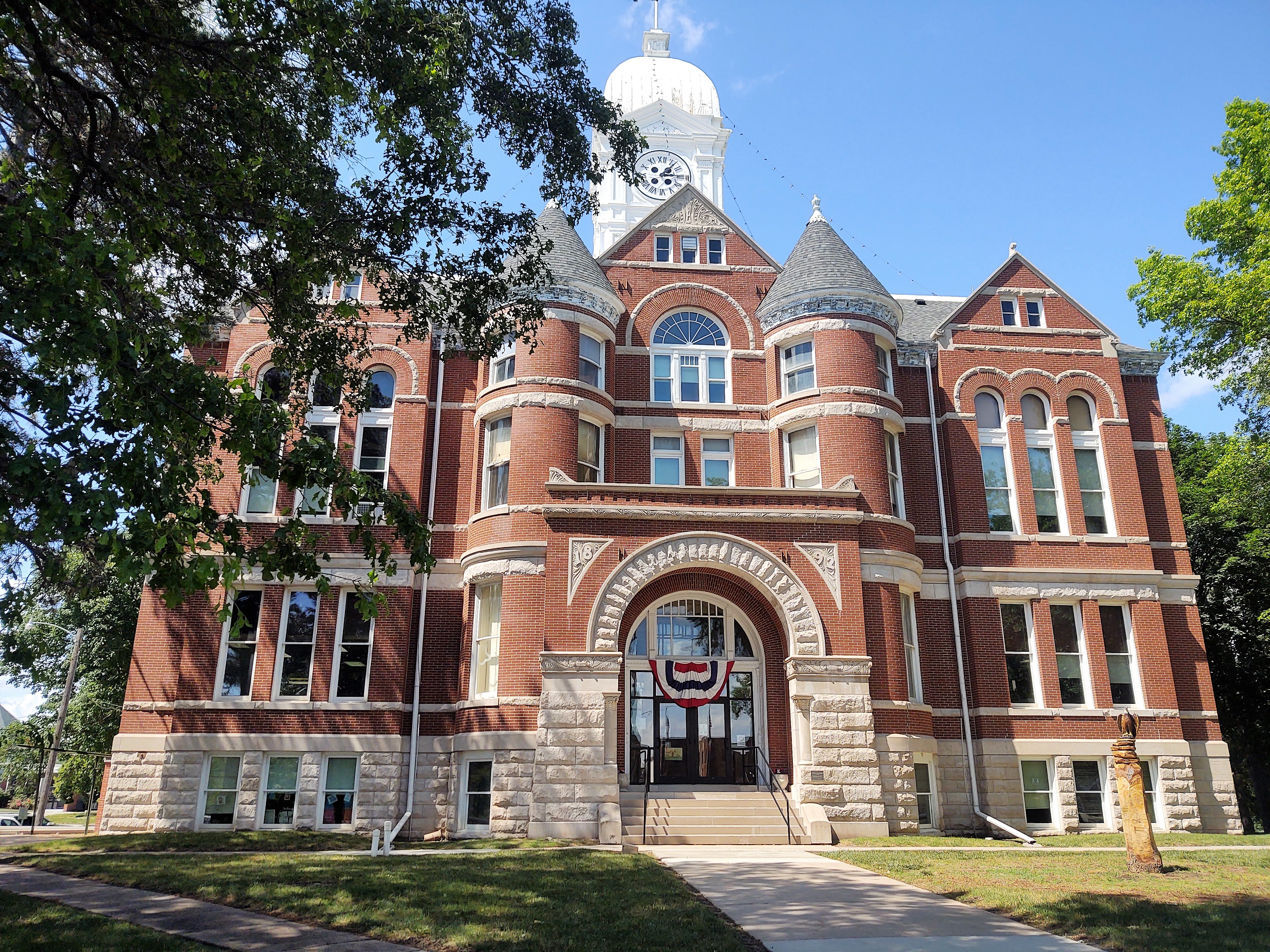

- Location within Iowa Location within the United States
- Interactive map showing the location for Taylor County Courthouse
- Location: Court Ave. Bedford, Iowa
- Coordinates: 40°40′1″N 94°43′8″W
- Area: less than one acre
- Built: 1892
- Built by: Allen H. Chaffie
- Architect: Francis M. Ellis
- Architectural style: Romanesque Revival
- MPS: County Courthouses in Iowa TR
- NRHP reference No.: 81000271
- Added to NRHP: July 2, 1981

The Taylor County Courthouse in Bedford, Iowa, United States, was built in 1892. It was listed on the National Register of Historic Places in 1981 as a part of the County Courthouses in Iowa Thematic Resource. The courthouse was the second building the county has used for court functions and county administration.

== History ==
The first courthouse for Taylor County was begun in 1863. It was constructed of stone on the south side of the square in Bedford. Additional office space was rented as the county grew and required more space for county government.

The cornerstone for the present courthouse was laid in June 1892. The three-story Romanesque Revival building was completed in the spring the following year. It was designed by Omaha architect Francis M. Ellis, and Allen H. Chaffie was the contractor. The building was built for $38,000. Because the contractor lost money on the project the county gave him an additional $1,000 and a gold watch for adhering to the original contract price.

== Architecture ==
The courthouse is a three-story red brick Bedford limestone structure. The main entrance is a recessed entry within a wide stone trimmed arch. Above it are two turrets with conical roofs that flank a large arched window. A large white square cupola with a clock and dome rises from the center of the building. The basement level is composed of coursed stone. The building is capped by a hipped roof. The interior features an elegant spiral staircase, which is original to the building. There are fireplaces in most of the rooms and tile floors. The significance of the courthouse is derived from its association with county government, and the political power and prestige of Bedford as the county seat.

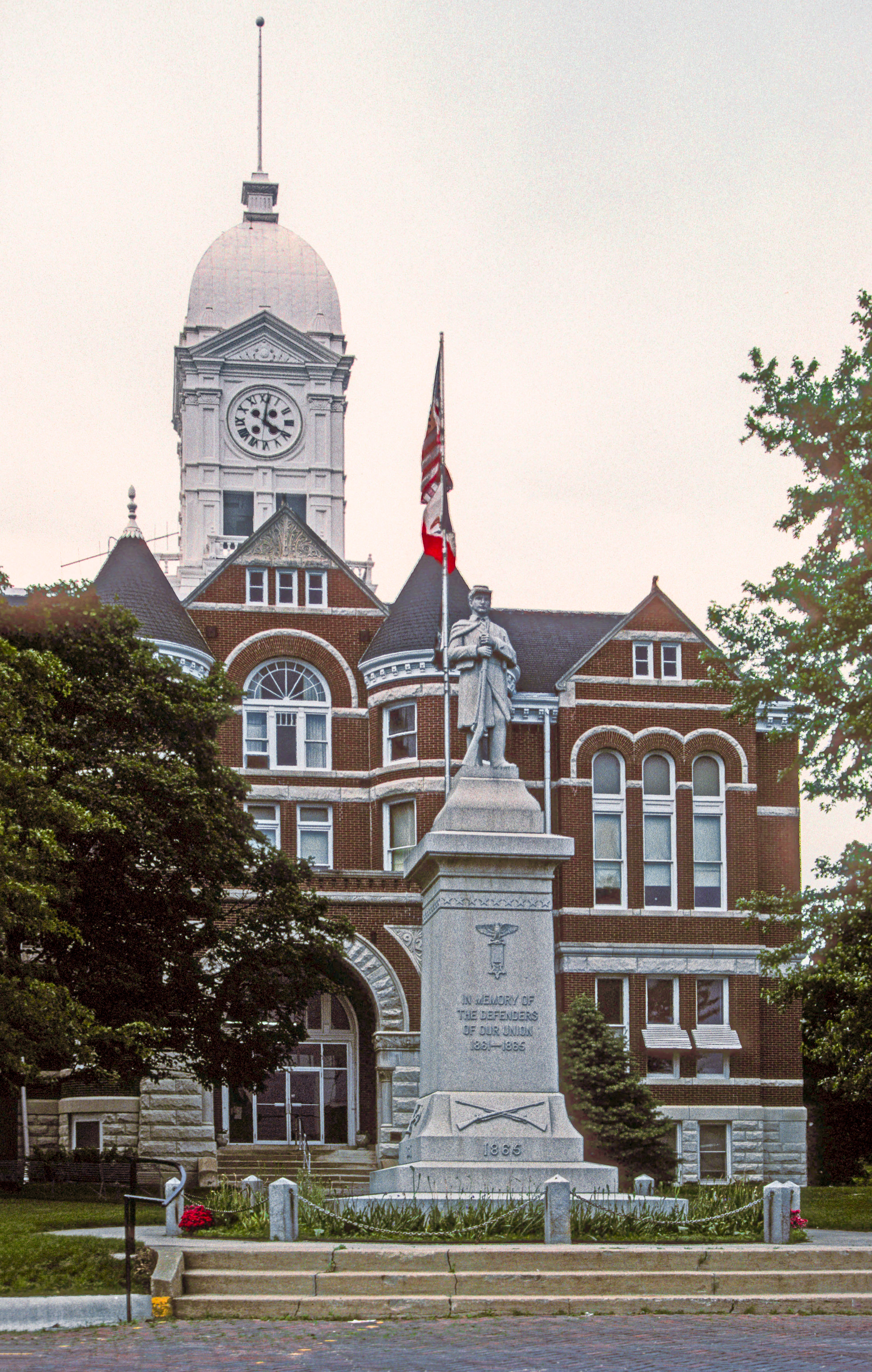
