= Bedford, Iowa =

- City
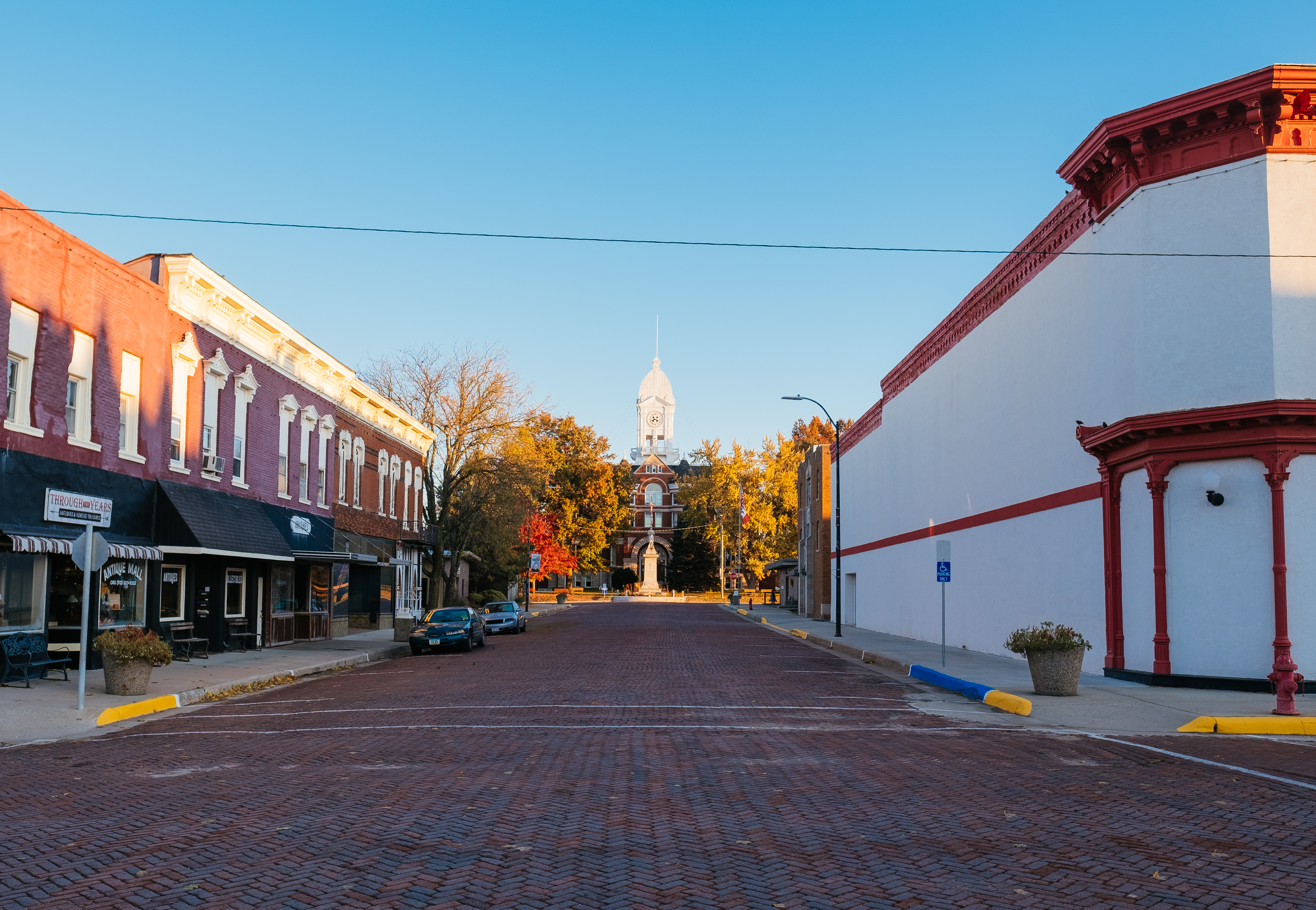
- Taylor County Courthouse

- Location of Bedford, Iowa
- Coordinates: 40°40′16″N 94°43′26″W
- Country: USA
- State: Iowa
- County: Taylor

Area
  - Total: 1.61 sq mi (4.18 km^{2})
  - Land: 1.61 sq mi (4.16 km^{2})
  - Water: 0.0077 sq mi (0.02 km^{2})
- Elevation: 1,171 ft (357 m)

Population (2020)
  - Total: 1,508
  - Density: 939/sq mi (362.7/km^{2})
- Time zone: UTC-6 (Central (CST))
  - Summer (DST): UTC-5 (CDT)
- ZIP code: 50833
- Area code: 712
- FIPS code: 19-05365
- GNIS feature ID: 2394105
- Website: www.bedfordia.org

Bedford is a city in Taylor County, Iowa, United States. The population was 1,508 at the 2020 census. It is the county seat of Taylor County. Lake of Three Fires State Park is located several miles northeast of Bedford.

== History ==
The community is believed to have gotten its name from Thomas J. Bedford, who was the first west bound Pony Express rider to deliver the mail on its final leg from Benicia, California to Oakland, California on April 23, 1861. Bedford is believed to have operated Bedfords Store and Trading Post in 1848 within the city limits. He moved to California later that year, in the California Gold Rush.

The community was called "Grove" when a post office was established on June 30, 1855. On June 24, 1856 it was changed to Bedford. Other histories have noted possible other sources of the name:

- Bedford in England (possible original home of early settlers)
- Bedford, Indiana (reputed home of the surveyor)
- Bedford, Pennsylvania (reputed home of a "government engineer")

The community was formally established as the county seat of Taylor County by a legislative act in 1853. The town was formally laid out on lots sold on July 4, 1853 (which at the time identified the community as "Bedforde"). According to town legend, a barrel of whiskey was placed on the grounds and lots sold for $10 to $20 - although none of the lots were paid for at the time.

The present Taylor County Courthouse was built in 1893.

Bedford was served by a branch of the Burlington Northern Railroad (formerly Chicago, Burlington and Quincy Railroad or "CB&Q") that ran from Creston, Iowa to St. Joseph, Missouri This line was removed along with almost all the branches in southwestern Iowa and northwestern Missouri in the late 1970s to early 1980s

Bedford is also served by Iowa Highway 148 which runs north and south into Missouri, and Iowa Highway 2 runs east and west and connects most of the county seats in the southern tier of Iowa counties. There is an excellent series of farm to market road system, mostly paved, as well.

== Geography ==
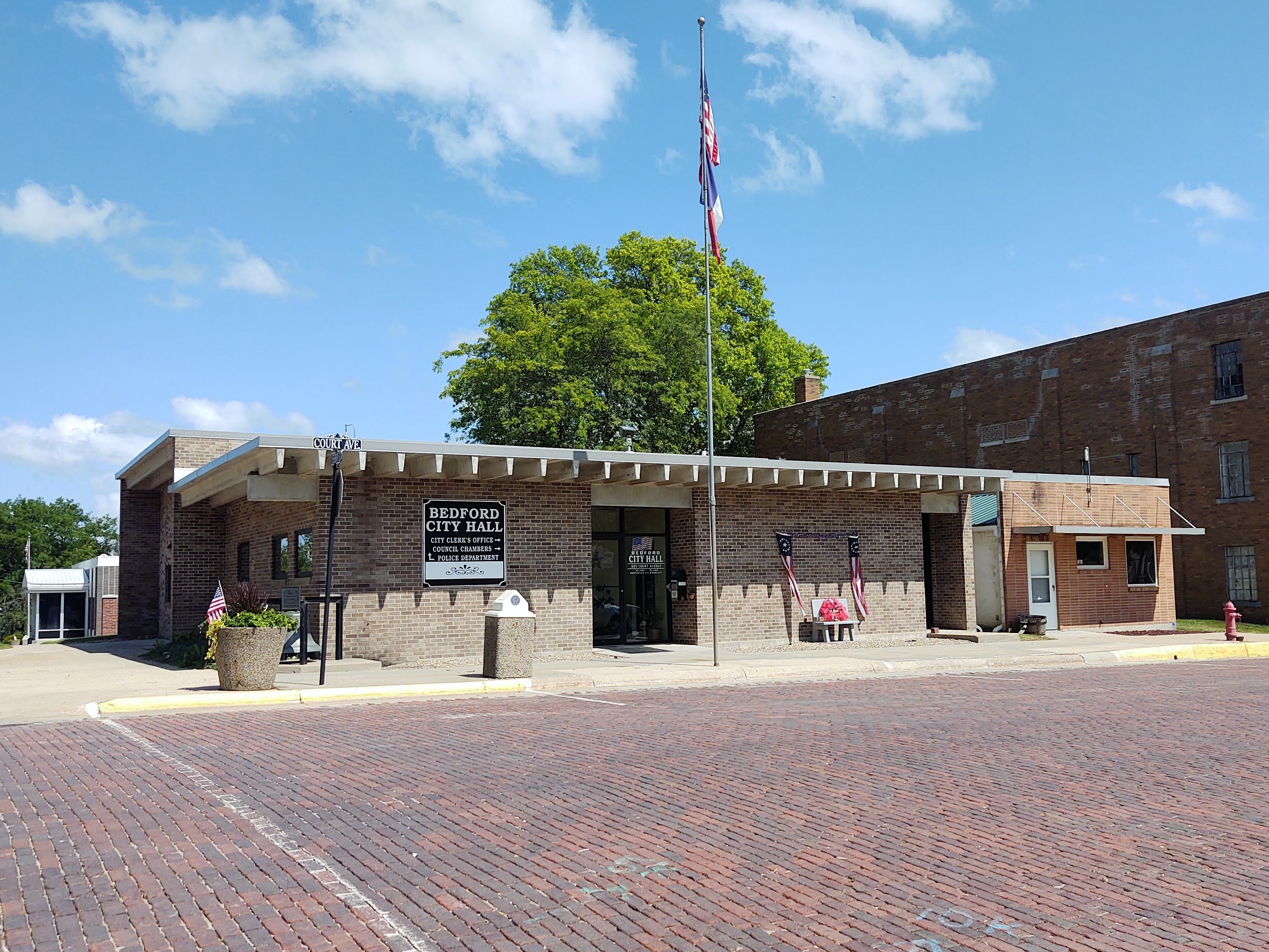
Bedford City Hall

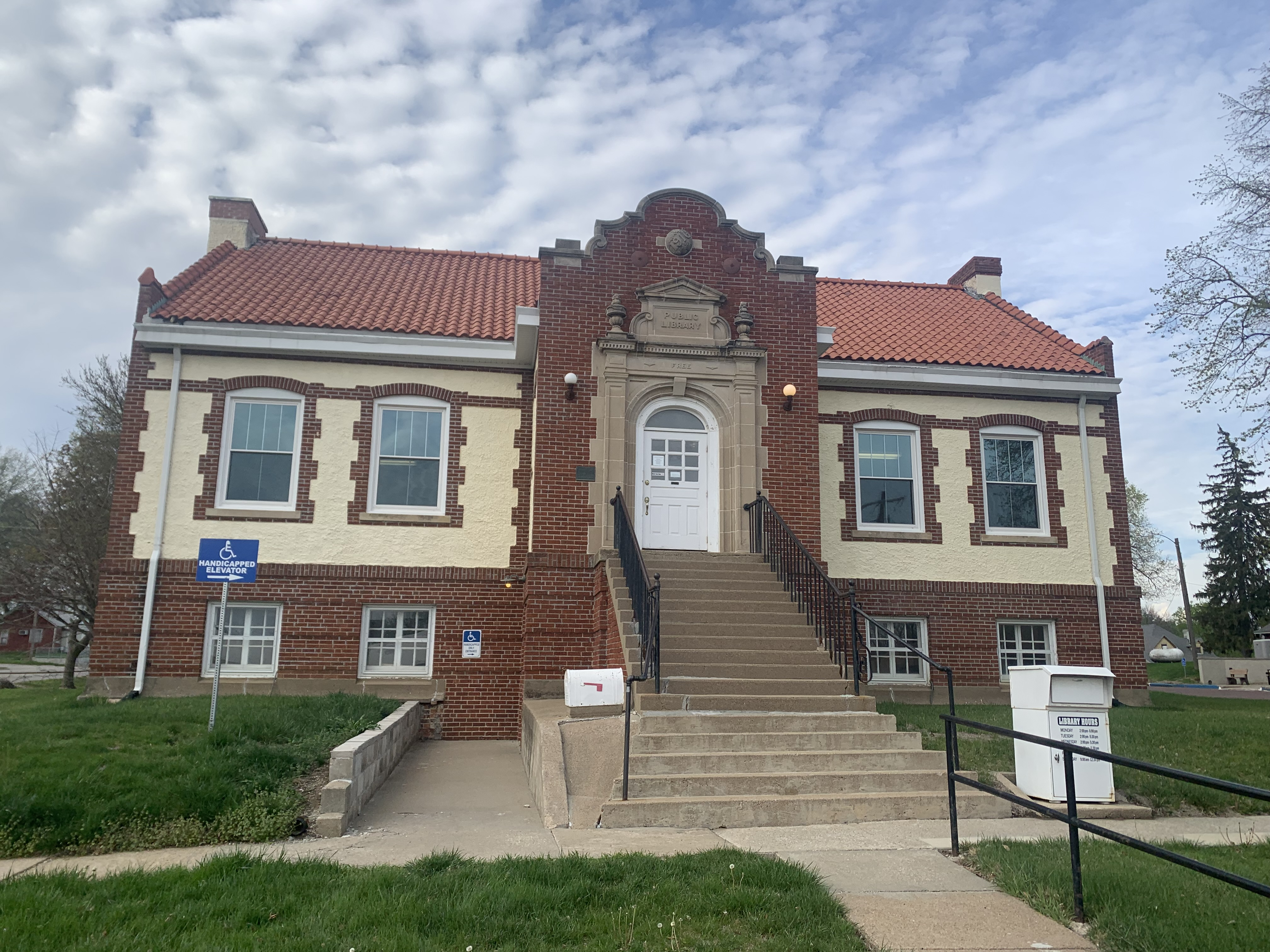
Bedford Carneige Library

Bedford is located along the East Fork of the One Hundred and Two River.

According to the United States Census Bureau, the city has a total area of 1.61 square miles (4.17 km^{2}), of which 1.60 square miles (4.14 km^{2}) is land and 0.01 square miles (0.03 km^{2}) is water.

=== Climate ===
According to the Köppen Climate Classification system, Bedford has a hot-summer humid continental climate, abbreviated "Dfa" on climate maps.

Climate data for Bedford, Iowa, 1991–2020 normals, extremes 1898–2018
Month	Jan	Feb	Mar	Apr	May	Jun	Jul	Aug	Sep	Oct	Nov	Dec	Year
Record high °F (°C)	68 (20)	76 (24)	90 (32)	94 (34)	97 (36)	102 (39)	110 (43)	108 (42)	107 (42)	94 (34)	81 (27)	70 (21)	110 (43)
Mean maximum °F (°C)	55.0 (12.8)	60.2 (15.7)	74.2 (23.4)	83.3 (28.5)	86.5 (30.3)	91.7 (33.2)	96.1 (35.6)	95.0 (35.0)	90.0 (32.2)	82.3 (27.9)	69.2 (20.7)	56.1 (13.4)	97.5 (36.4)
Mean daily maximum °F (°C)	31.9 (−0.1)	37.1 (2.8)	49.9 (9.9)	62.0 (16.7)	72.0 (22.2)	81.6 (27.6)	85.6 (29.8)	84.0 (28.9)	77.1 (25.1)	64.7 (18.2)	49.4 (9.7)	36.8 (2.7)	61.0 (16.1)
Daily mean °F (°C)	22.2 (−5.4)	26.7 (−2.9)	38.7 (3.7)	50.1 (10.1)	61.3 (16.3)	71.3 (21.8)	75.5 (24.2)	73.6 (23.1)	65.4 (18.6)	52.8 (11.6)	38.9 (3.8)	27.6 (−2.4)	50.3 (10.2)
Mean daily minimum °F (°C)	12.4 (−10.9)	16.3 (−8.7)	27.6 (−2.4)	38.2 (3.4)	50.5 (10.3)	61.1 (16.2)	65.4 (18.6)	63.1 (17.3)	53.7 (12.1)	40.9 (4.9)	28.5 (−1.9)	18.4 (−7.6)	39.7 (4.3)
Mean minimum °F (°C)	−9.0 (−22.8)	−4.5 (−20.3)	7.7 (−13.5)	22.9 (−5.1)	36.6 (2.6)	47.6 (8.7)	54.5 (12.5)	51.6 (10.9)	36.8 (2.7)	24.5 (−4.2)	11.8 (−11.2)	−4.4 (−20.2)	−15.2 (−26.2)
Record low °F (°C)	−32 (−36)	−34 (−37)	−24 (−31)	1 (−17)	19 (−7)	37 (3)	40 (4)	37 (3)	22 (−6)	10 (−12)	−11 (−24)	−30 (−34)	−34 (−37)
Average precipitation inches (mm)	1.08 (27)	1.49 (38)	2.42 (61)	3.60 (91)	5.27 (134)	5.54 (141)	4.64 (118)	4.32 (110)	3.38 (86)	2.97 (75)	2.13 (54)	1.59 (40)	38.43 (975)
Average snowfall inches (cm)	7.6 (19)	7.2 (18)	3.3 (8.4)	1.3 (3.3)	0.0 (0.0)	0.0 (0.0)	0.0 (0.0)	0.0 (0.0)	0.0 (0.0)	0.1 (0.25)	0.7 (1.8)	7.9 (20)	28.1 (70.75)
Average precipitation days (≥ 0.01 in)	5.5	6.5	8.0	10.5	11.6	9.8	9.2	8.9	7.2	7.6	6.0	6.6	97.4
Average snowy days (≥ 0.1 in)	3.0	3.3	1.4	0.5	0.0	0.0	0.0	0.0	0.0	0.0	0.5	3.7	12.4
Source 1: NOAA
Source 2: National Weather Service (mean maxima and minima 1981–2010)

== Demographics ==
Historical populations
Year	Pop.	±%
1870	720	—
1880	1,763	+144.9%
1890	1,643	−6.8%
1900	1,977	+20.3%
1910	1,883	−4.8%
1920	2,073	+10.1%
1930	2,100	+1.3%
1940	2,151	+2.4%
1950	2,000	−7.0%
1960	1,807	−9.7%
1970	1,733	−4.1%
1980	1,692	−2.4%
1990	1,528	−9.7%
2000	1,620	+6.0%
2010	1,440	−11.1%
2020	1,508	+4.7%
Source:"U.S. Census website". United States Census Bureau. and Iowa Data Center; Source: U.S. Decennial Census

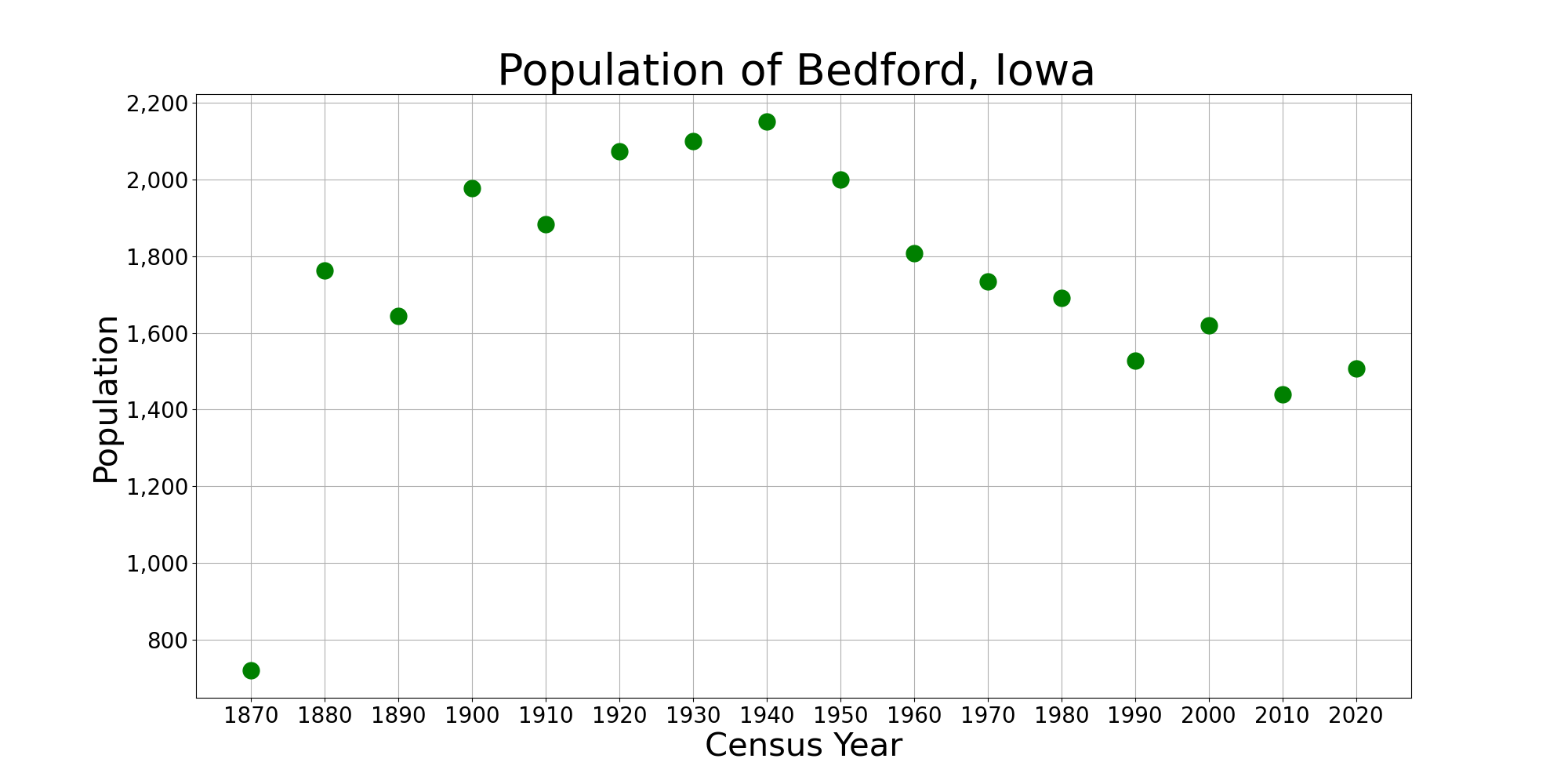
The population of Bedford, Iowa from US census data

=== 2020 census ===
As of the 2020 census, there were 1,508 people, 620 households, and 376 families residing in the city. The population density was 939.4 inhabitants per square mile (362.7/km^{2}). There were 701 housing units at an average density of 436.7 per square mile (168.6/km^{2}).

The median age in the city was 39.0 years. 25.7% of residents were under the age of 18 and 23.3% were 65 years of age or older. 28.2% of residents were under the age of 20; 5.2% were between the ages of 20 and 24; 23.0% were from 25 and 44; and 20.2% were from 45 and 64. The gender makeup of the city was 47.9% male and 52.1% female. For every 100 females there were 92.1 males, and for every 100 females age 18 and over there were 86.2 males.

Of the 620 households, 28.9% had children under the age of 18 living with them, 47.4% were married-couple households, 7.4% were cohabitating-couple households, 29.5% had a female householder with no spouse or partner present, and 15.6% had a male householder with no spouse or partner present. 39.4% of all households were non-families. 33.4% of all households were made up of individuals, and 20.2% had someone living alone who was 65 years old or older.

Of all housing units, 11.6% were vacant. The homeowner vacancy rate was 2.9% and the rental vacancy rate was 3.5%. 0.0% of residents lived in urban areas, while 100.0% lived in rural areas.

Racial composition as of the 2020 census
Race	Number	Percent
White	1,420	94.2%
Black or African American	1	0.1%
American Indian and Alaska Native	4	0.3%
Asian	4	0.3%
Native Hawaiian and Other Pacific Islander	0	0.0%
Some other race	21	1.4%
Two or more races	58	3.8%
Hispanic or Latino (of any race)	23	1.5%

=== 2010 census ===
As of the census of 2010, there were 1,440 people, 614 households, and 382 families living in the city. The population density was 900.0 inhabitants per square mile (347.5/km^{2}). There were 730 housing units at an average density of 456.3 per square mile (176.2/km^{2}). The racial makeup of the city was 97.4% White, 0.5% African American, 0.1% Native American, 0.3% Asian, 0.8% from other races, and 1.0% from two or more races. Hispanic or Latino of any race were 1.3% of the population.

There were 614 households, of which 28.2% had children under the age of 18 living with them, 50.3% were married couples living together, 8.5% had a female householder with no husband present, 3.4% had a male householder with no wife present, and 37.8% were non-families. 33.1% of all households were made up of individuals, and 19.1% had someone living alone who was 65 years of age or older. The average household size was 2.29 and the average family size was 2.91.

The median age in the city was 43.9 years. 24.1% of residents were under the age of 18; 6.8% were between the ages of 18 and 24; 20.6% were from 25 to 44; 25.4% were from 45 to 64; and 23.2% were 65 years of age or older. The gender makeup of the city was 47.2% male and 52.8% female.

=== 2000 census ===
As of the census of 2000, there were 1,620 people, 691 households, and 422 families living in the city. The population density was 1,007.2 inhabitants per square mile (388.9/km^{2}). There were 769 housing units at an average density of 478.1 per square mile (184.6/km^{2}). The racial makeup of the city was 98.15% White, 0.06% African American, 0.25% Native American, 0.12% Asian, 0.74% from other races, and 0.68% from two or more races. Hispanic or Latino of any race were 1.67% of the population.

There were 691 households, out of which 25.0% had children under the age of 18 living with them, 51.1% were married couples living together, 8.1% had a female householder with no husband present, and 38.9% were non-families. 33.1% of all households were made up of individuals, and 21.4% had someone living alone who was 65 years of age or older. The average household size was 2.28 and the average family size was 2.95.

Age spread: 23.0% under the age of 18, 7.4% from 18 to 24, 23.2% from 25 to 44, 19.8% from 45 to 64, and 26.7% who were 65 years of age or older. The median age was 42 years. For every 100 females, there were 84.1 males. For every 100 females age 18 and over, there were 79.6 males.

The median income for a household in the city was $28,125, and the median income for a family was $34,943. Males had a median income of $27,788 versus $18,125 for females. The per capita income for the city was $14,313. About 10.4% of families and 13.7% of the population were below the poverty line, including 21.4% of those under age 18 and 12.2% of those age 65 or over.

== Education ==
It is within the Bedford Community School District.

== Notable people ==
- James P. Flick (1845–1929), U.S. representative from Iowa

== See also ==
- Lenox Round Barn, part of the Taylor County Historical Museum and listed on the National Register of Historic Places.
