= Alvin Miller House =

Historic house in Iowa, United States

- U.S. National Register of Historic Places
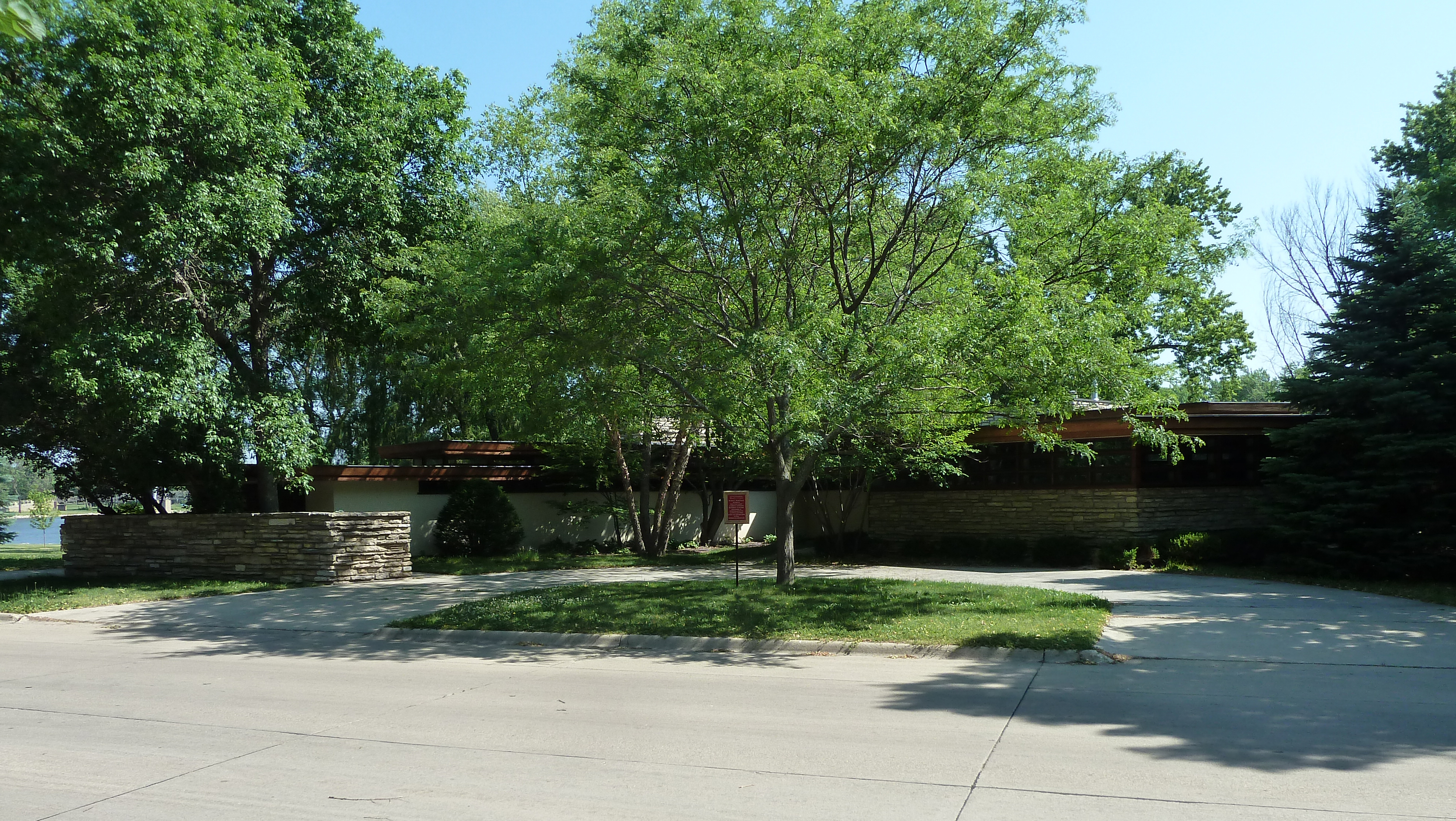

- Location within Iowa
- Location: 1107 Court Street; Charles City, Iowa, United States
- Coordinates: 43°4′0.75″N 92°41′1.65″W
- Built: 1946 - 1951
- Architect: Frank Lloyd Wright
- Architectural style: Usonian
- NRHP reference No.: 78001221
- Added to NRHP: 11/16/1978

The Alvin Miller House is a Usonian home beside the Cedar River in Charles City, Iowa. It was designed by Frank Lloyd Wright and constructed over a five-year period completed in 1951. The single-story structure features a two-level flat roof which allows for clerestory windows. It was severely damaged in the flood of 2008. Restoration efforts surrounding the house after the flooding are detailed in the Alvin Miller House website.

According to the National Park Service document on the seven Iowa Usonian homes: "The third Iowa Usonian, the Alvin Miller House in Charles City, was designed in the same year as the Grant House but was not built until 1951-1952. The Miller House was featured in Wright's 'The Natural House;' it is the smallest of the Iowa Usonians; and, unlike the Walter and Grant houses, the Miller House has a much sturdier, less radical character."

== Gallery ==
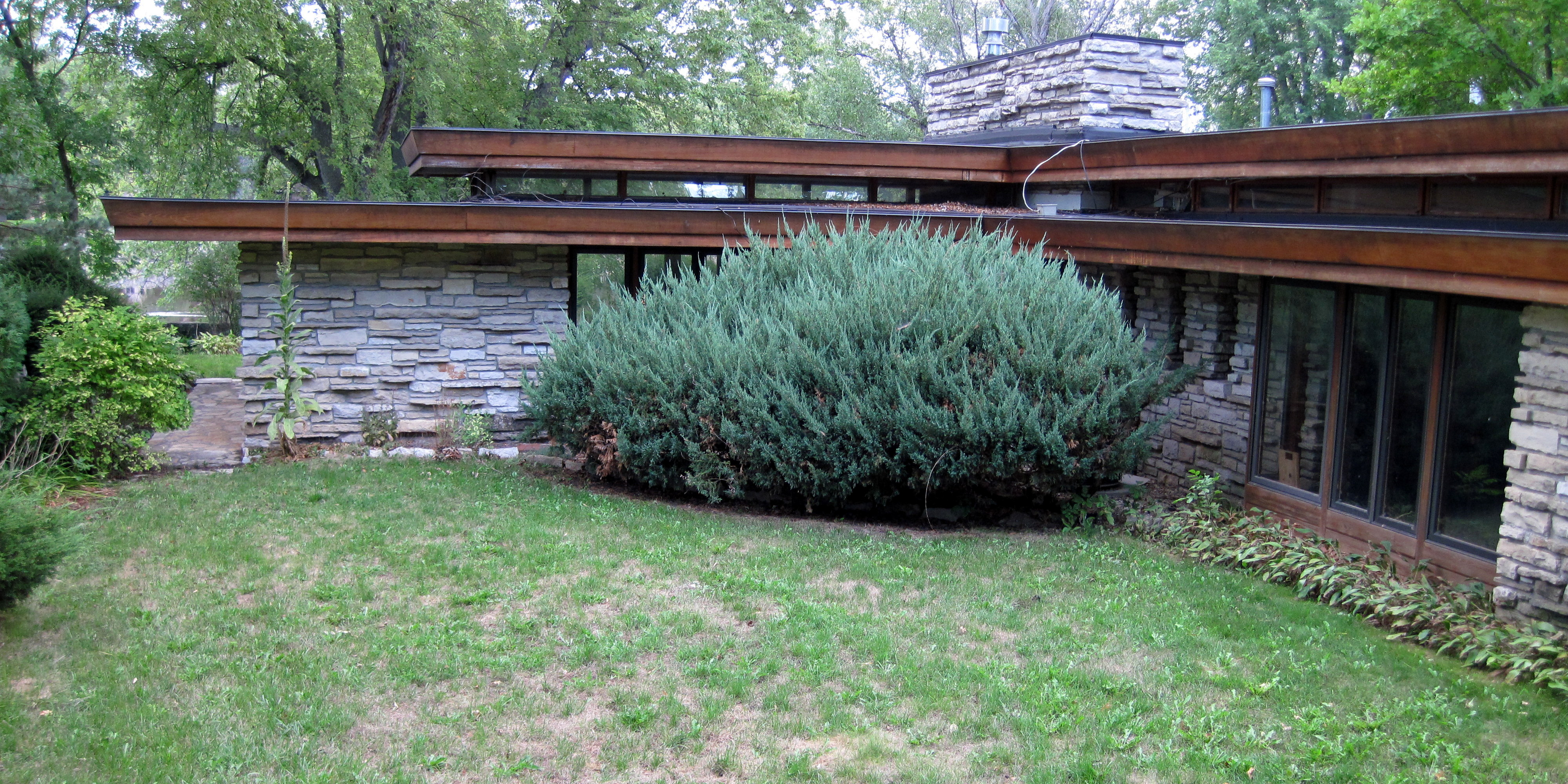

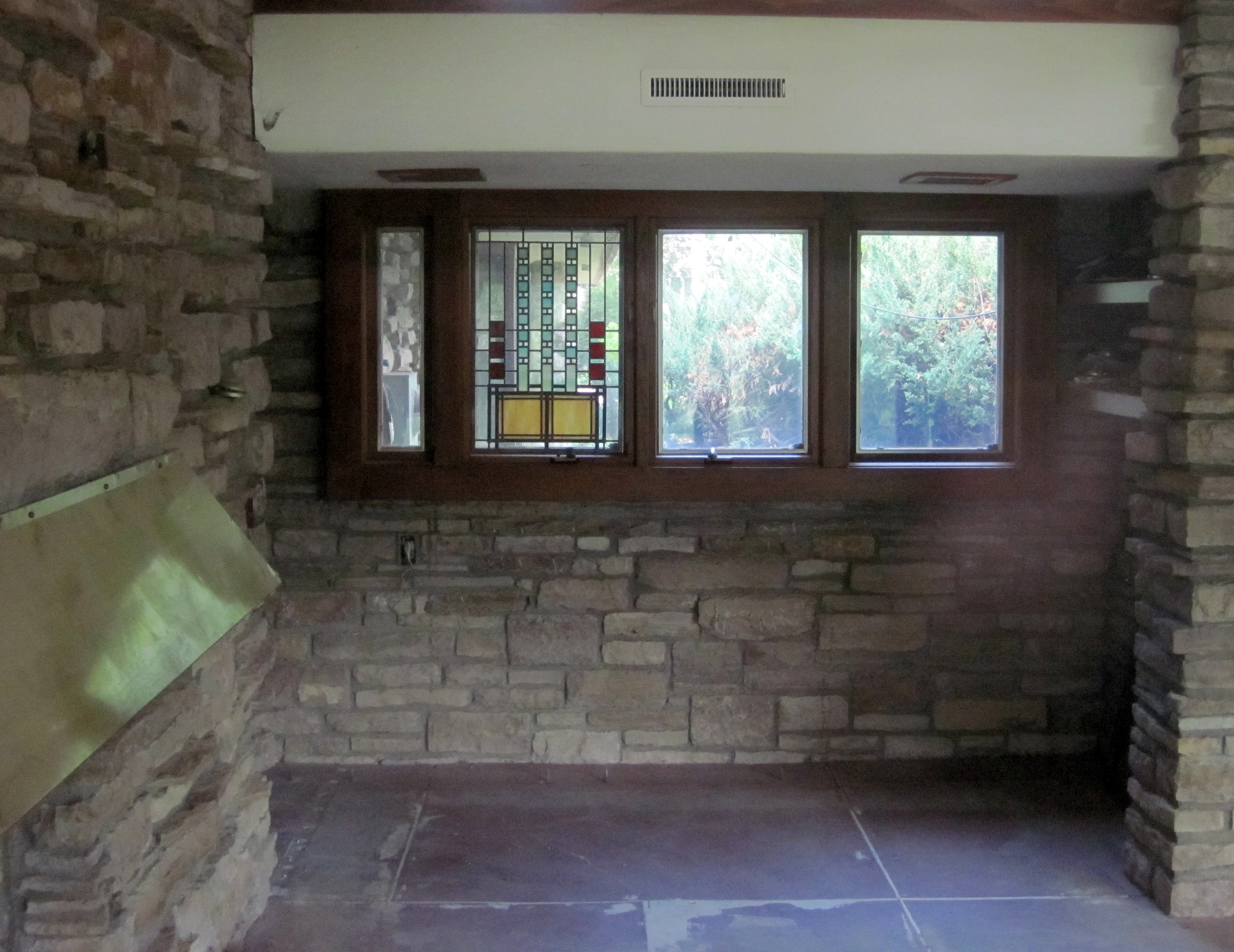

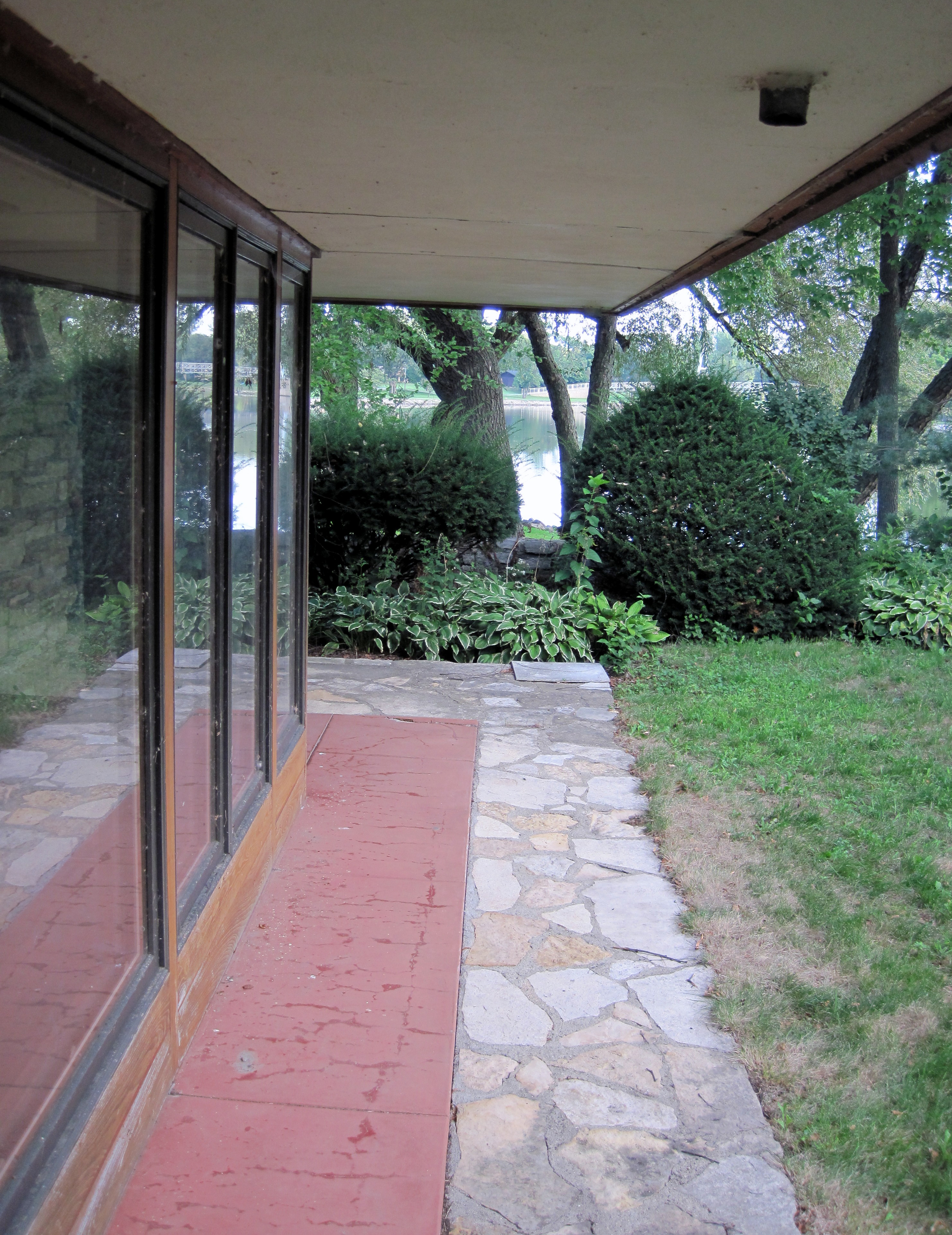

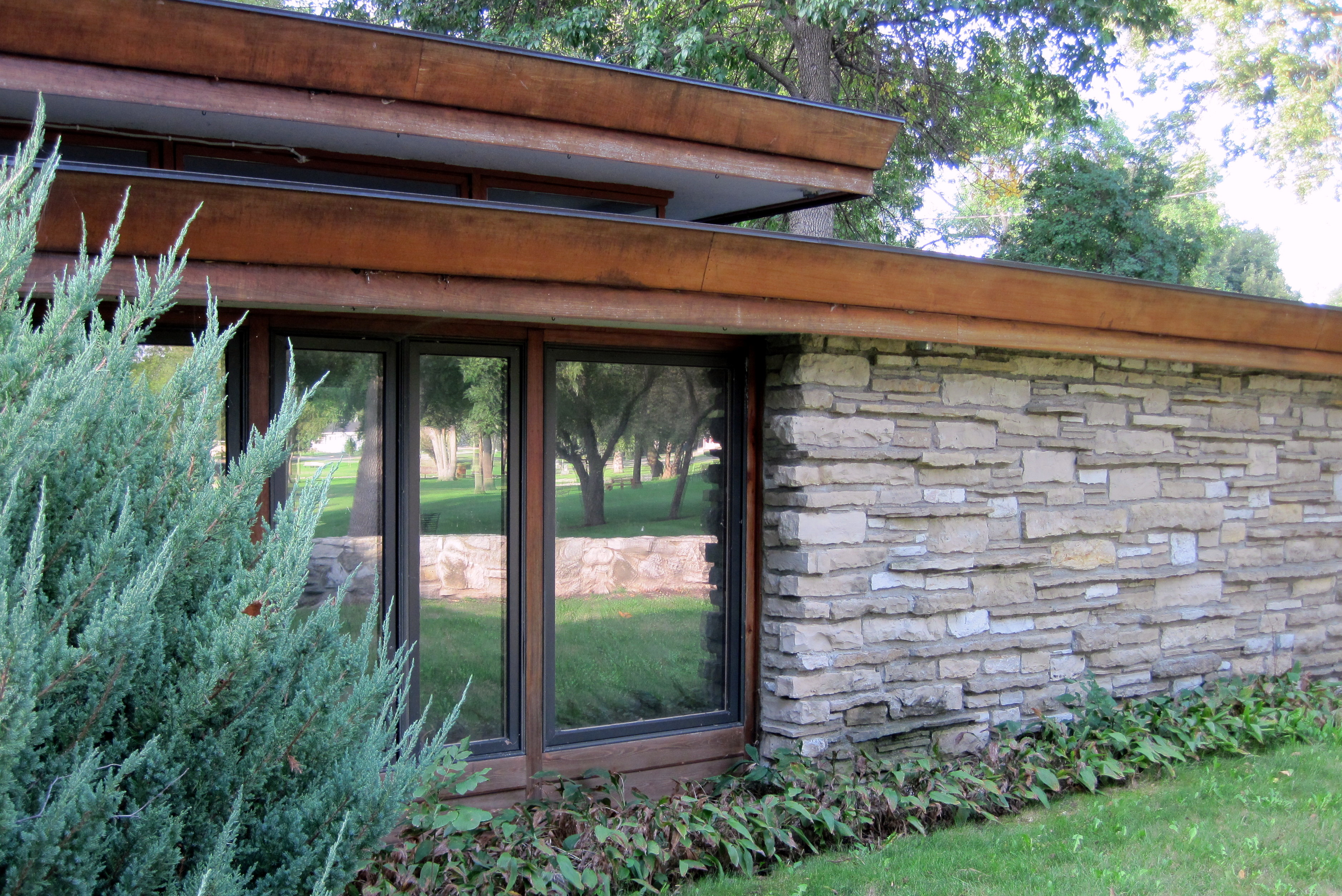

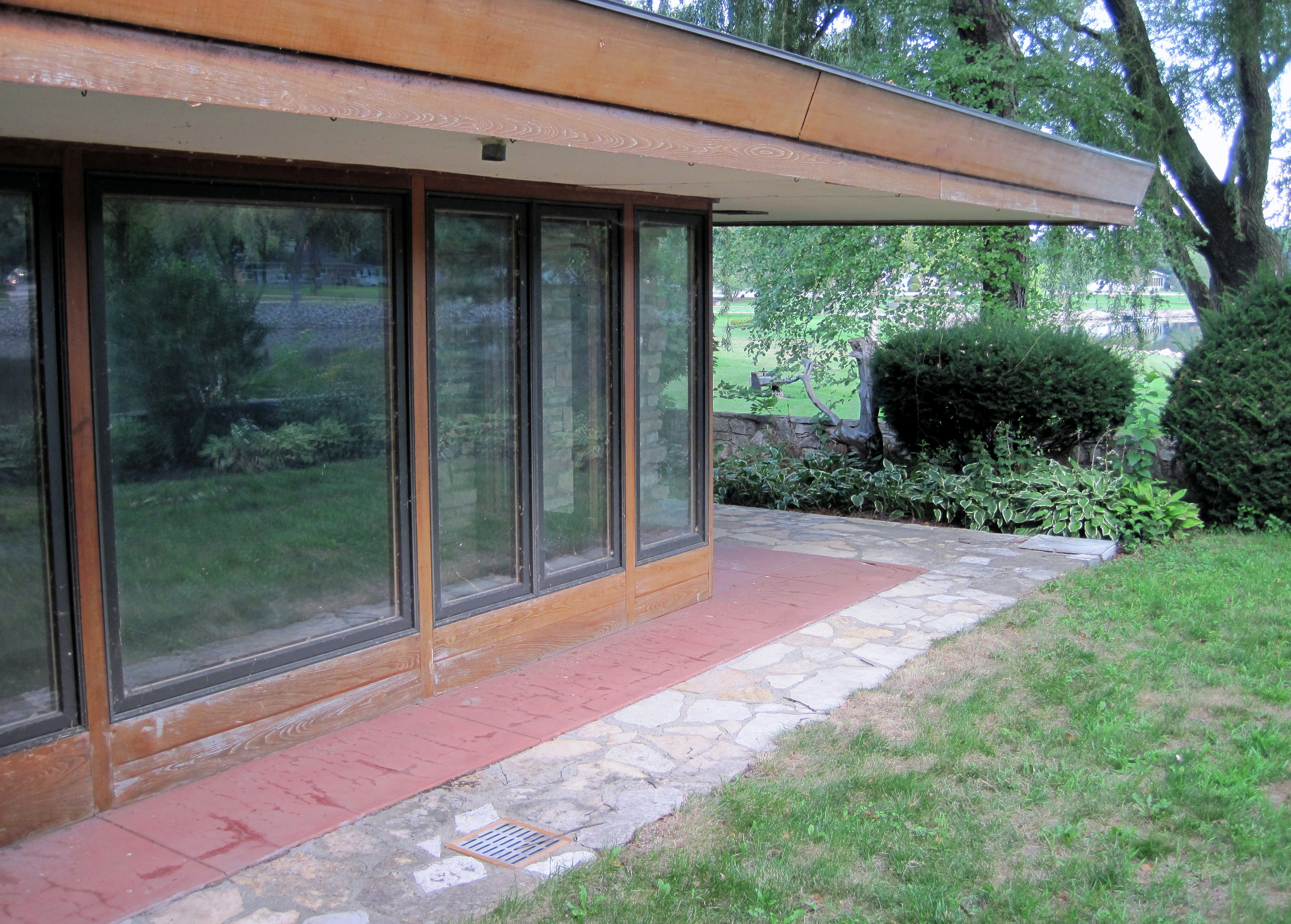

== See also ==
- List of Frank Lloyd Wright works
