= Paul F. Riordan =

- Born: November 8, 1920; Charles City, Iowa, U.S.
- Died: February 8, 1944 (aged 23) near Cassino, Italy
- Burial place: Mount Olivet Cemetery, Raytown, Missouri
- Military career
- Allegiance: United States of America
- Branch: United States Army
- Service years: 1940 – 1944
- Rank: Second Lieutenant
- Units: 133rd Infantry Regiment, 34th Infantry Division
- Conflicts: World War II; *Battle of Monte Cassino †
- Awards: Medal of Honor

Paul F. Riordan (November 8, 1920 – February 8, 1944) was a United States Army officer and a recipient of the United States military's highest decoration—the Medal of Honor—for his actions in World War II during the Battle of Monte Cassino.

== Biography ==
Riordan joined the Army from Kansas City, Missouri in 1940, and by February 3, 1944, was serving as a second lieutenant in the 133rd Infantry Regiment, 34th Infantry Division. On that day, near Cassino, Italy, Riordan single-handedly silenced a German machine gun emplacement. Five days later, on February 8, he was again in the lead during an attack on a German strongpoint. Cut off from his unit, he attempted to take the objective on his own, but was killed in the process. He was posthumously awarded the Medal of Honor on September 11, 1944.

Riordan, aged 23 at his death, was buried in Mount Olivet Cemetery, Raytown, Missouri.

== Medal of Honor citation ==
Second Lieutenant Riordan's official Medal of Honor citation reads:

For conspicuous gallantry and intrepidity above and beyond the call of duty. In the attack on the approaches to the city of Cassino on February 3, 1944, 2d Lt. Riordan led 1 of the assault platoons. Attacking Hill 175, his command was pinned down by enemy machinegun fire from the hill and from a pillbox about 45 yards to the right of the hill. In the face of intense fire, 2d Lt. Riordan moved out in full view of the enemy gunners to reach a position from where he could throw a handgrenade into the pillbox. Then, getting to his knees, he hurled the grenade approximately 45 yards, scoring a direct hit. The grenade killed 1 and wounded the other 2 Germans in the nest and silenced the gun. Another soldier then cleaned out the enemy pillboxes on the hill itself, and the company took its objective. Continuing the assault into Cassino itself on February 8, 1944, 2d Lt. Riordan and his platoon were given the mission of taking the city jail house, one of the enemy's several strongpoints. Again 2d Lt. Riordan took the lead and managed to get through the ring of enemy fire covering the approaches and reached the building. His platoon, however, could not get through the intense fire and was cut off. 2d Lt. Riordan, aware that his men were unable to follow, determined to carry on single-handed, but the numerically superior enemy force was too much for him to overcome, and he was killed by enemy small-arms fire after disposing of at least 2 of the defenders. 2d Lt. Riordan's bravery and extraordinary heroism in the face of almost certain death were an inspiration to his men and exemplify the highest traditions of the U.S. Armed Forces.

== Awards and decorations ==
2nd Lieutenant Riordan was awarded the following decorations for his service.

Badge	Combat Infantryman Badge		
1st row	Medal of Honor		
2nd row	Bronze Star Medal Retroactively Awarded, 1947	Purple Heart	American Defense Service Medal
3rd row	American Campaign Medal	European–African–Middle Eastern Campaign Medal with 2 Campaign stars	World War II Victory Medal

== See also ==
- List of Medal of Honor recipients
- List of Medal of Honor recipients for World War II
