= Central Park–North Main Street Historic District =

Historic district in Iowa, United States

- U.S. National Register of Historic Places
- U.S. Historic district
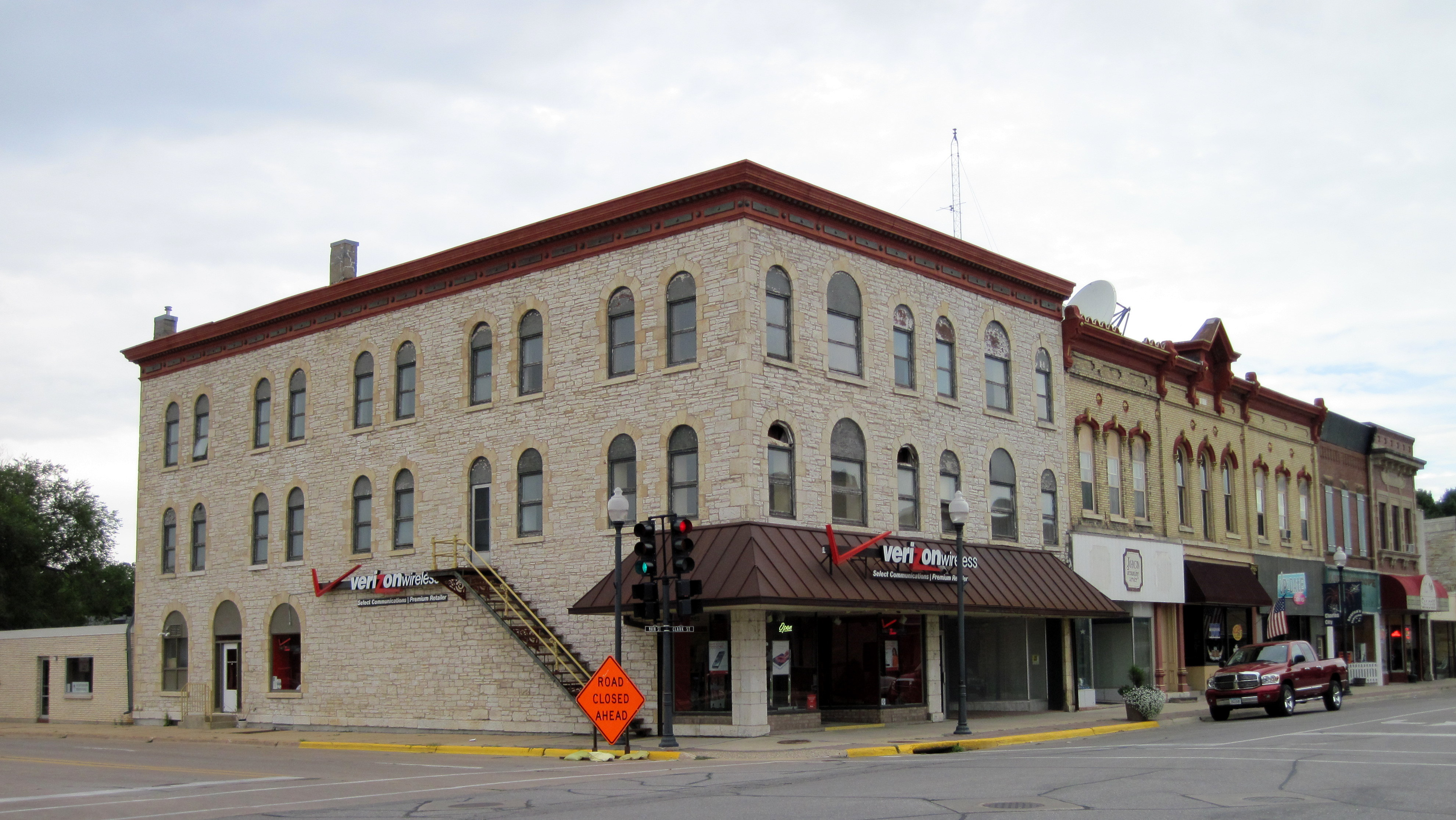

- Location within Iowa Location within the United States
- Location: N. Main St. and N. Jackson St. Charles City, Iowa
- Coordinates: 43°04′06″N 92°40′43″W
- Area: 4.9 acres (2.0 ha)
- NRHP reference No.: 76000771
- Added to NRHP: August 10, 1976

The Central Park–North Main Street Historic District is a nationally recognized historic district located in Charles City, Iowa, United States. It was listed on the National Register of Historic Places in 1976. At the time of its nomination it consisted of 17 resources, which included 16 contributing buildings and one contributing site. The buildings were built from 1877 to 1914, and with one exception, are masonry. The one exception is a frame house. Most of the buildings are two stories in height. The exceptions are 1½-story Carnegie library and two large limestone buildings that are three stories in height. The district is L-shaped, starting at the Cedar River and including the buildings on the west side of North Main Street up to and including Central Park, the town square. There are also three buildings on the west side of the square along North Jackson Street.
