= Charles City, Iowa =

- City
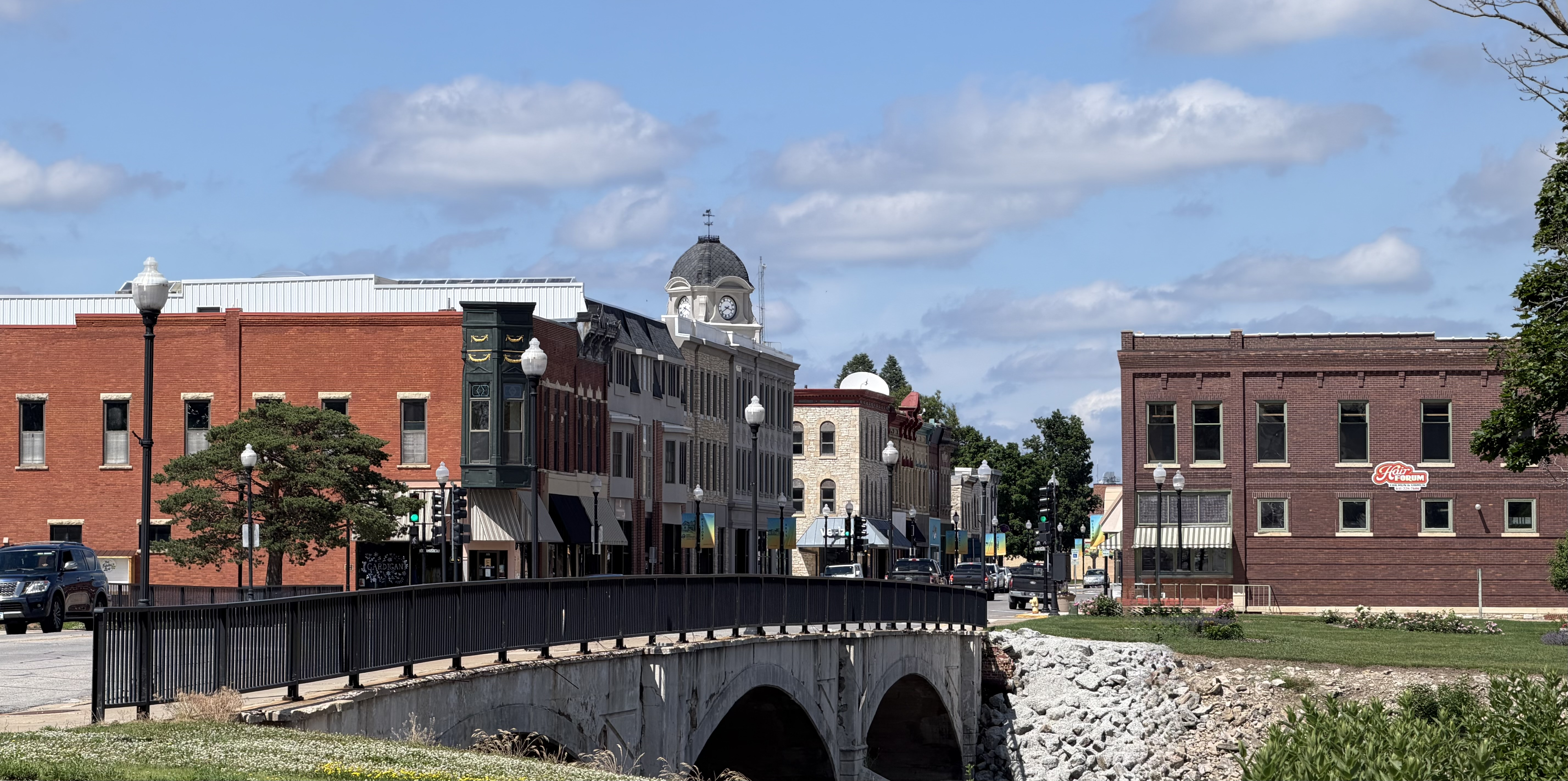
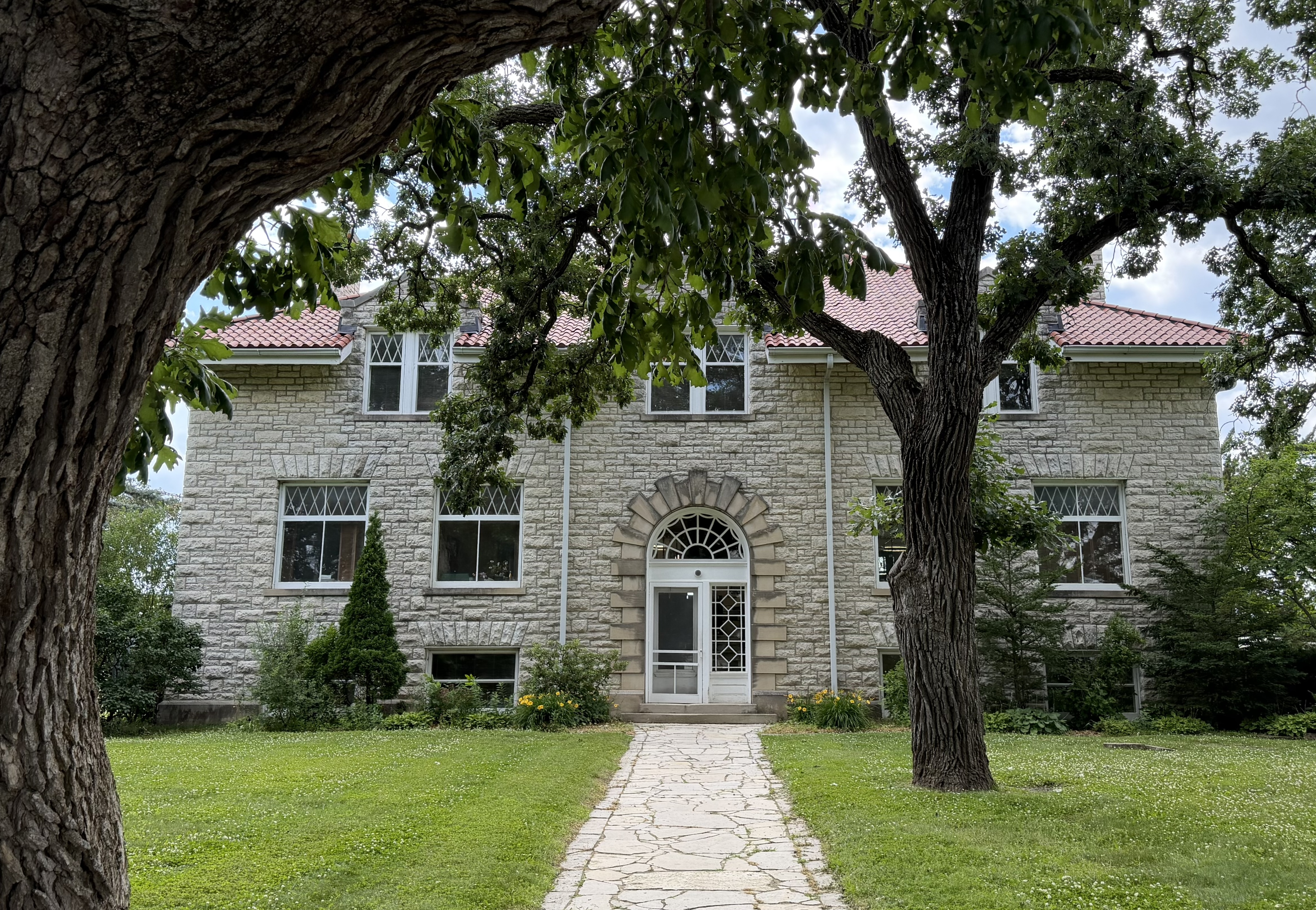
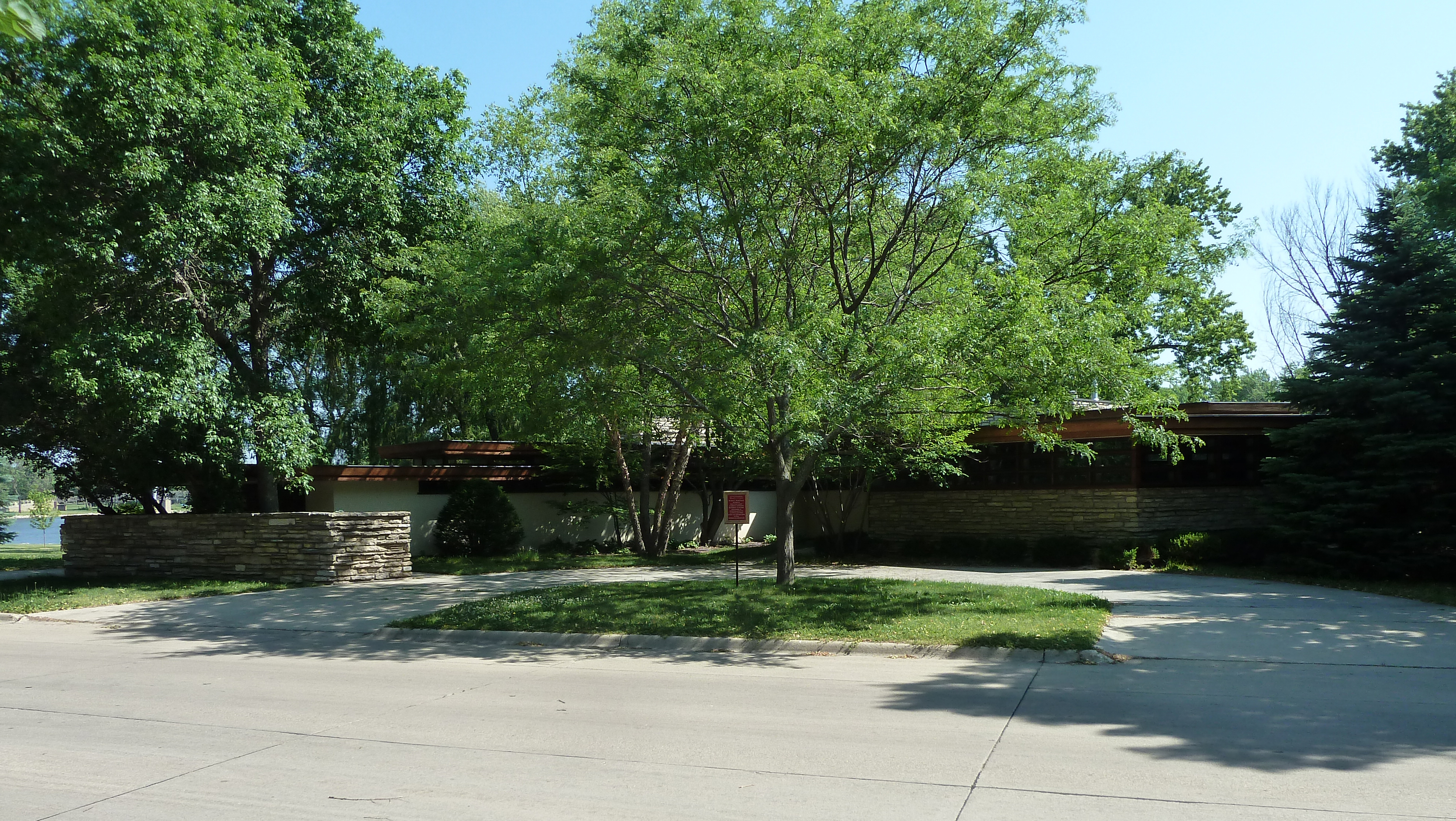
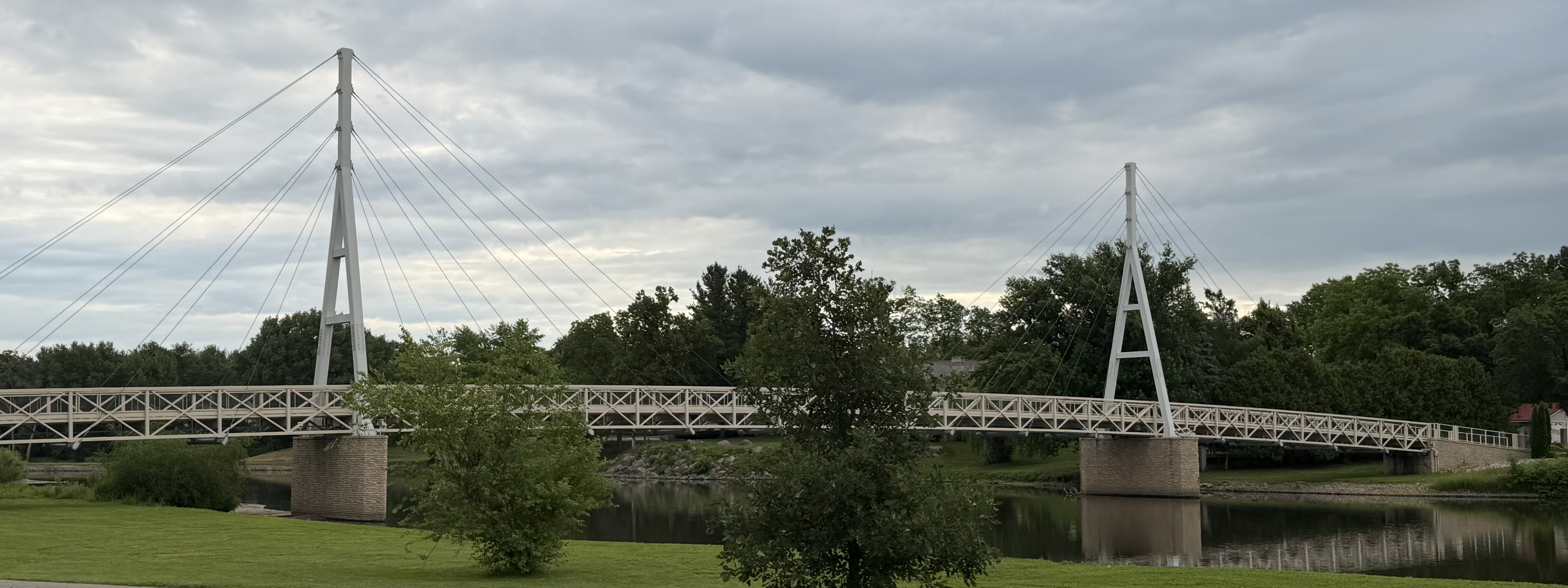
- Downtown Charles City Sherman Nursury Alvin Miller House Cedar River Suspension Bridge

- Seal
- Nickname: "Chuck Town"
- Motto: America's Hometown
- Location of Charles City, Iowa
- Coordinates: 43°03′52″N 92°40′28″W
- Country: USA
- State: Iowa
- County: Floyd
- Township: Saint Charles
- Incorporated: May 1, 1869
- Named for: Charles Floyd

Area
  - Total: 6.21 sq mi (16.09 km^{2})
  - Land: 6.12 sq mi (15.86 km^{2})
  - Water: 0.089 sq mi (0.23 km^{2})
- Elevation: 991 ft (302 m)

Population (2020)
  - Total: 7,396
  - Density: 1,207.8/sq mi (466.32/km^{2})
- Time zone: UTC-6 (Central (CST))
  - Summer (DST): UTC-5 (CDT)
- ZIP codes: 50616, 50620
- Area code: 641
- FIPS code: 19-12765
- GNIS feature ID: 467592
- Website: cityofcharlescity.org

Charles City is a city in and the county seat of Floyd County, Iowa, United States. The population was 7,396 at the 2020 census. Charles City is a significant commercial, industrial, and transportation center for the area. U.S. Routes 18, its spur highway 218 (the Avenue of the Saints), and Iowa Highway 14 converge in the city. The nearest population centers are Mason City (35 miles to the west), Waterloo-Cedar Falls (45 miles to the southeast), and the state capital of Des Moines is located 150 miles to the southwest.

Charles City is known for its history in agricultural manufacturing, and is where the term "tractor" was first conied by the former Hart-Parr Gasoline Engine Company. Other sites of interest include the Alvin Miller House, a Usonian home designed by Frank Lloyd Wright, the Art Deco Charles Theatre, and the Floyd County Museum. The Cedar River divides the town flowing to the southeast, and located downtown is the first whitewater park developed in Iowa.

== History ==
The Ho-Chunk people, also known as Winnebago, had long occupied this area and had a village along the Cedar River.

In 1851 Joseph Kelly, the first-known European-American settler in the area, came here after the Ho-Chunk had been pushed out. He believed that the site was ideal for a town, as it had water from the Cedar River and adjacent timberland to supply building needs. The settlement was first called "Charlestown" after his son. By 1852, twenty-five other settler families had joined Kelly. The town name was changed, first to "St. Charles" and then to "Charles City," to avoid duplication of other Iowa town names.

Charles City became the county seat after Floyd County was established in 1851 and officially organized in 1854. Floyd County was named for Sergeant Charles Floyd, a member of the 1804 Lewis and Clark Expedition.

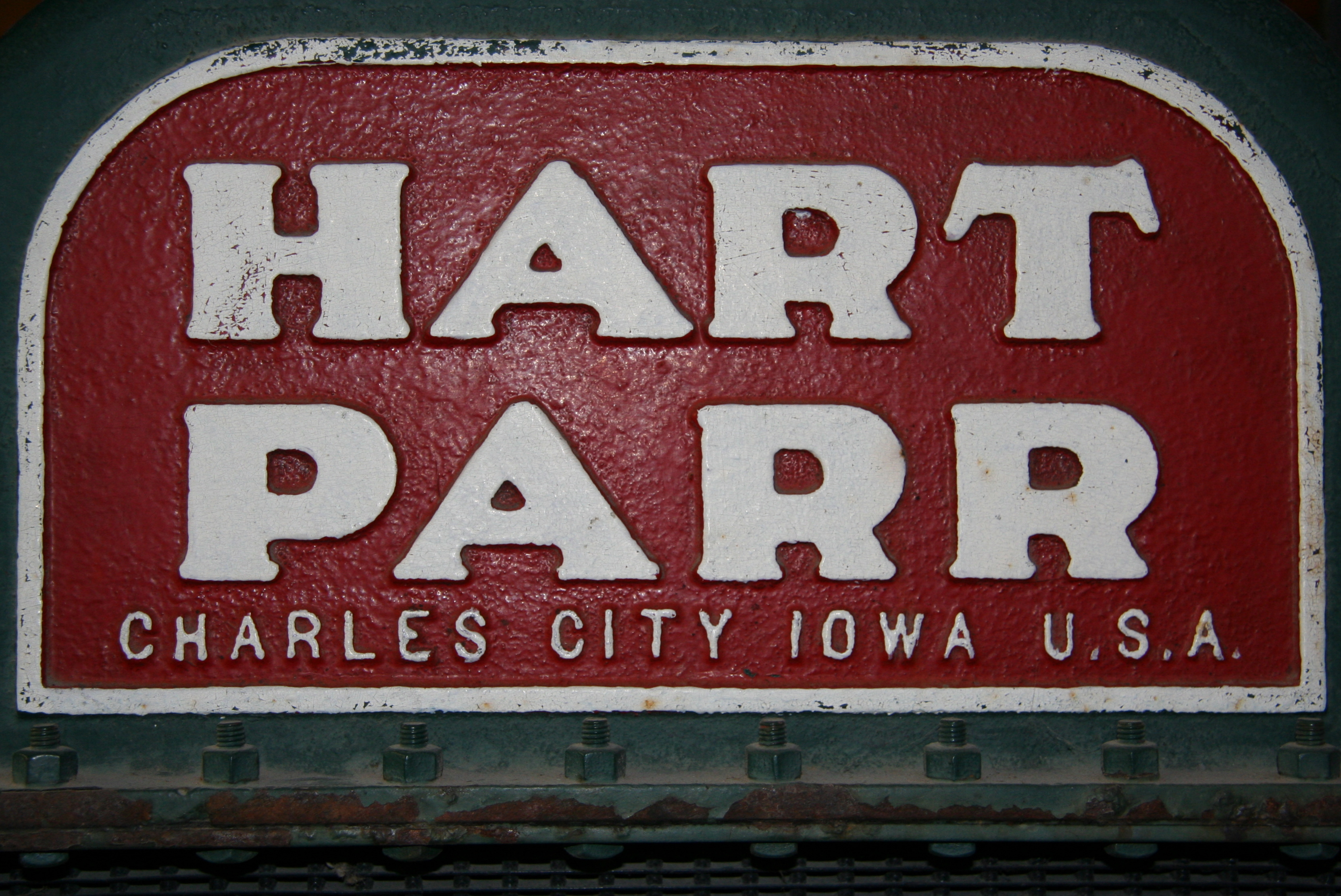
Hart-Parr Charles City nameplate on an early tractor

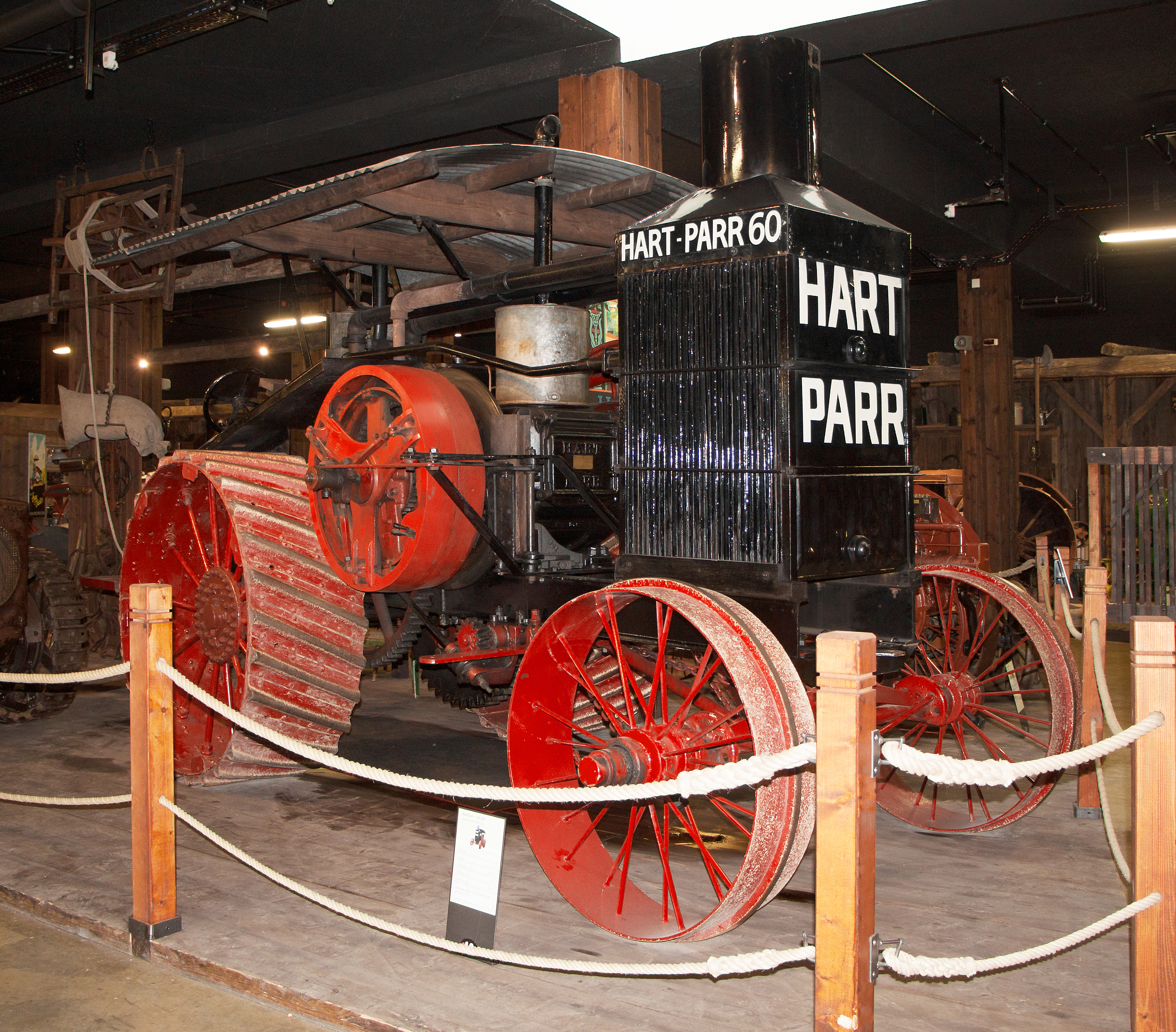
Hart-Parr 30-60 "Old Reliable"

Charles City is known for the role it played in the history of the American tractor. A native son Charles Walter Hart, whose father owned three local farms, met Charles H. Parr in college. After graduating from the University of Wisconsin, Hart and Parr developed a two-cylinder gasoline engine. They set up their Hart-Parr Gasoline Engine Company in Charles City in 1897. In 1901 the two founders coined the word "tractor", with Latin roots and a combination of the words "traction" and "power". In 1903 the firm built fifteen "tractors", the first successful production-model tractor line in the U.S. The 14,000-pound No. 3 is the oldest surviving internal combustion engine tractor in the United States. It is displayed at the Smithsonian National Museum of American History in Washington, D.C.

In 1929, Hart-Parr was one of the four companies that merged to form Oliver Farm Equipment Company and finally the White Farm-New Idea Equipment Co. At its peak in the mid-1970s, the sprawling plant complex encompassed 23 acres and employed nearly 3,000 workers. The 1980s farm crisis and other economic pressures led to the closing of the plant in 1993. As of 2013, the vacant site stands ready for re-use.

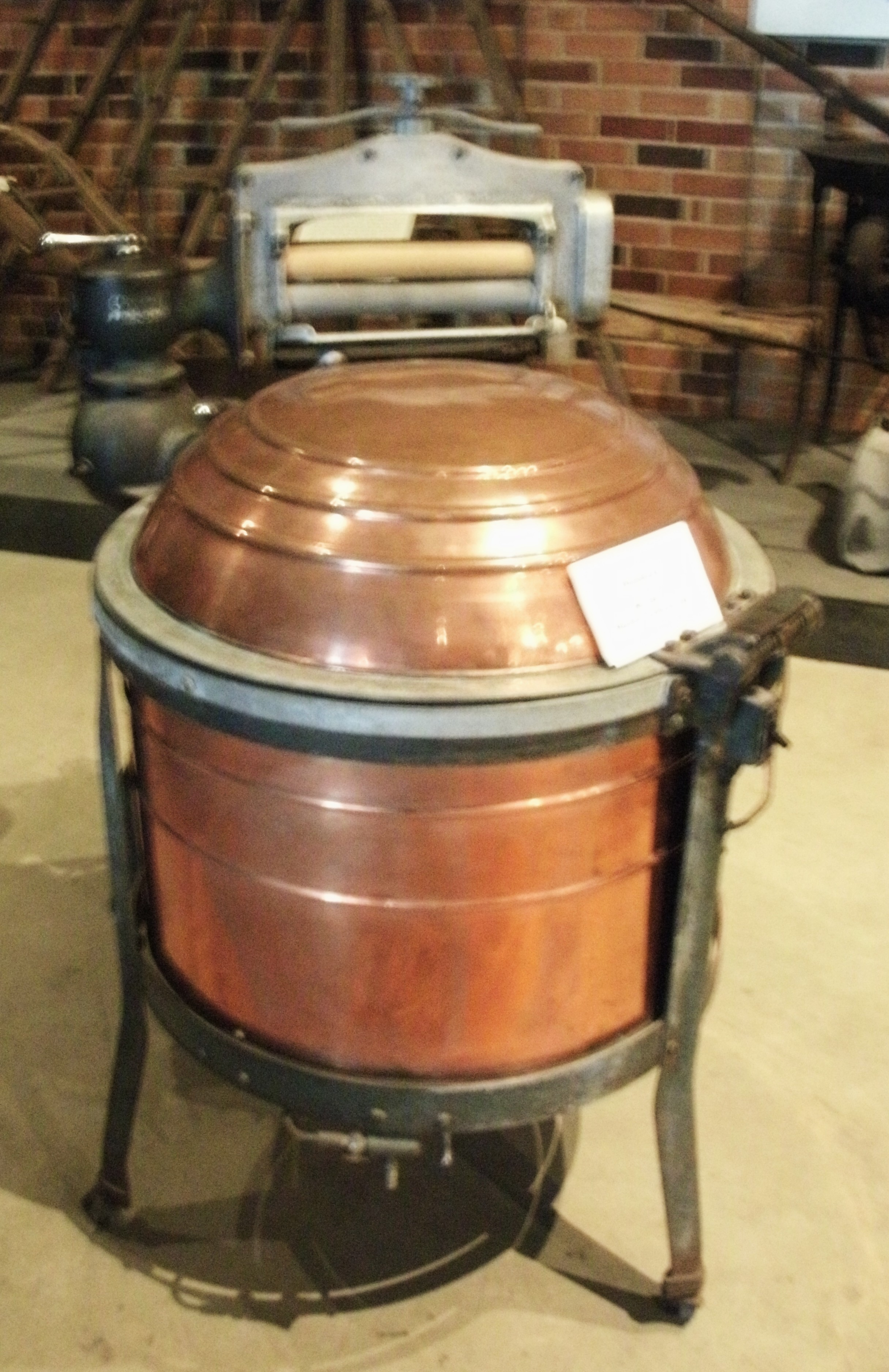
HART-PARR washing machine

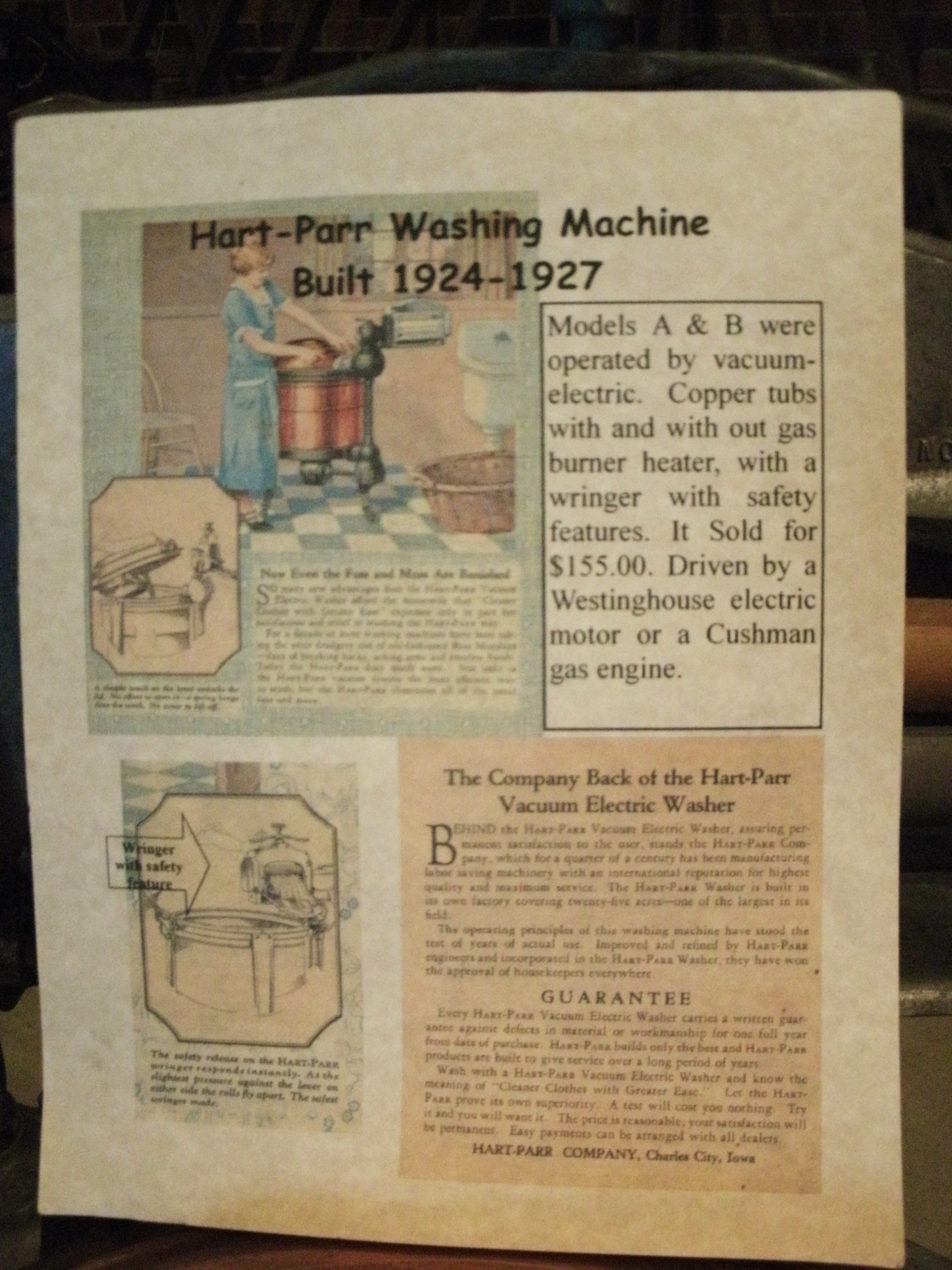

Although best known for producing tractors, the Hart-Parr company also made some of the first washing machines. They sold for $155 in the 1920s, and the buyer had the option of ordering either an electric or gasoline engine.

The Floyd County Historical Museum preserves the plant's history and memories in an extensive collection of documents and artifacts.

Charles City is the location of the last lynching in Iowa, that of James Cullen in 1907.

National women's rights leader Carrie Lane Chapman Catt spent her girlhood years on a farm south of Charles City. Catt is well known as a prominent leader of the woman's suffrage movement and was instrumental in gaining passage of the 19th Amendment, ratified on August 18, 1920, which granted women the right to vote. Carrie Catt also founded the League of Women Voters. Her home and a visitor center are open for public viewing.

On June 9, 2008, record flooding caused major damage in the town. Charles City's historic suspension bridge, which crossed over the Cedar River, collapsed. Numerous homes around the city were also destroyed. A new bridge, built with FEMA and state funding, opened in early 2010.

Charles City is the location of the Dr. Alvin L. Miller House, a Usonian house designed by Frank Lloyd Wright.

=== Tornadoes ===
Charles City is in a location subject to tornadoes, and has been severely damaged by them many times in its history. In the summer of 1858 (possibly July 21), while still known as the village of St. Charles, a "Terrific Tornado" was recorded. There were 16 deaths, 13 inside the village. The property value of buildings destroyed was into the thousands of dollars (1858 dollars), and the loss of crops was said to be "beyond comprehension", according to the newspaper account.

On June 8, 1908, a tornado destroyed or substantially damaged around 200 homes and barns. Residents W. R. Beck and a child were killed. The path of the tornado ran through the southeast part of the city, missing the business district. Loss of property was fifty thousand dollars (1908 dollars).

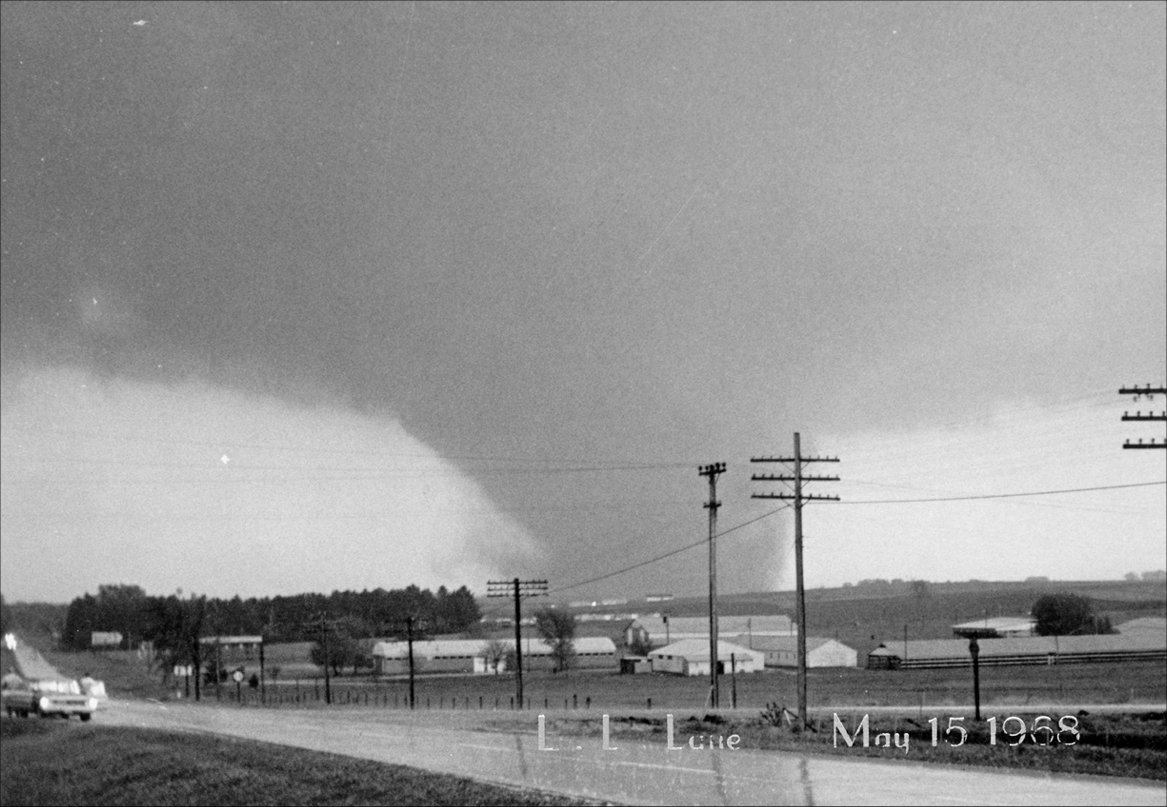
1968 Charles City tornado

==== 1968 tornado ====
Many people around the region remember Charles City as the site of a devastating F5 tornado that ripped through town on May 15, 1968. It resulted in 13 dead, hundreds injured, and was one of the largest twisters ever recorded in the state, this storm destroyed much of the downtown – 256 businesses and 1,250 homes. Damage estimates were of more than $20 million.

== Geography ==
According to the United States Census Bureau, the city has a total area of 6.31 square miles (16.34 km^{2}), of which 6.22 square miles (16.11 km^{2}) is land and 0.09 square miles (0.23 km^{2}) is water.

=== Climate ===
Climate data for Charles City, Iowa (1991–2020 normals, extremes 1893–present)
Month	Jan	Feb	Mar	Apr	May	Jun	Jul	Aug	Sep	Oct	Nov	Dec	Year
Record high °F (°C)	63 (17)	65 (18)	86 (30)	94 (34)	104 (40)	105 (41)	108 (42)	104 (40)	100 (38)	95 (35)	78 (26)	68 (20)	108 (42)
Mean maximum °F (°C)	44.4 (6.9)	48.2 (9.0)	67.0 (19.4)	80.7 (27.1)	87.5 (30.8)	91.4 (33.0)	91.8 (33.2)	90.2 (32.3)	88.4 (31.3)	80.5 (26.9)	65.2 (18.4)	48.2 (9.0)	94.1 (34.5)
Mean daily maximum °F (°C)	24.6 (−4.1)	29.5 (−1.4)	43.1 (6.2)	58.1 (14.5)	69.5 (20.8)	78.8 (26.0)	82.0 (27.8)	79.6 (26.4)	73.4 (23.0)	60.3 (15.7)	43.7 (6.5)	29.8 (−1.2)	56.0 (13.3)
Daily mean °F (°C)	16.6 (−8.6)	21.1 (−6.1)	34.2 (1.2)	47.4 (8.6)	59.0 (15.0)	68.7 (20.4)	72.0 (22.2)	69.6 (20.9)	62.4 (16.9)	49.6 (9.8)	35.0 (1.7)	22.5 (−5.3)	46.5 (8.1)
Mean daily minimum °F (°C)	8.6 (−13.0)	12.6 (−10.8)	25.3 (−3.7)	36.7 (2.6)	48.5 (9.2)	58.6 (14.8)	62.1 (16.7)	59.7 (15.4)	51.3 (10.7)	38.8 (3.8)	26.3 (−3.2)	15.1 (−9.4)	37.0 (2.8)
Mean minimum °F (°C)	−16.7 (−27.1)	−11.0 (−23.9)	1.0 (−17.2)	20.6 (−6.3)	32.4 (0.2)	44.8 (7.1)	50.4 (10.2)	48.4 (9.1)	34.4 (1.3)	22.0 (−5.6)	8.2 (−13.2)	−8.6 (−22.6)	−20.7 (−29.3)
Record low °F (°C)	−34 (−37)	−32 (−36)	−32 (−36)	3 (−16)	20 (−7)	34 (1)	39 (4)	34 (1)	19 (−7)	1 (−17)	−14 (−26)	−29 (−34)	−34 (−37)
Average precipitation inches (mm)	1.01 (26)	1.14 (29)	1.93 (49)	3.73 (95)	5.06 (129)	6.13 (156)	4.92 (125)	4.28 (109)	3.82 (97)	2.58 (66)	1.74 (44)	1.38 (35)	37.72 (958)
Average snowfall inches (cm)	9.5 (24)	9.3 (24)	5.4 (14)	2.1 (5.3)	0.3 (0.76)	0.0 (0.0)	0.0 (0.0)	0.0 (0.0)	0.0 (0.0)	0.1 (0.25)	2.8 (7.1)	8.0 (20)	37.5 (95)
Average precipitation days (≥ 0.01 in)	7.7	7.1	9.0	10.3	12.7	12.2	9.8	9.0	9.0	9.4	6.7	7.8	110.7
Average snowy days (≥ 0.1 in)	6.7	6.1	3.8	1.4	0.1	0.0	0.0	0.0	0.0	0.2	2.4	6.2	26.9
Source: NOAA

== Demographics ==
The peak of population was in 1950. The loss of industrial jobs has led to a decline in residents.

Historical population
Year	Pop.	±%
1870	2,166	—
1880	2,421	+11.8%
1890	2,802	+15.7%
1900	4,227	+50.9%
1910	5,892	+39.4%
1920	7,350	+24.7%
1930	8,039	+9.4%
1940	8,681	+8.0%
1950	10,309	+18.8%
1960	9,964	−3.3%
1970	9,268	−7.0%
1980	8,778	−5.3%
1990	7,878	−10.3%
2000	7,812	−0.8%
2010	7,652	−2.0%
2020	7,396	−3.3%
Iowa Data Center; Source: U.S. Decennial Census

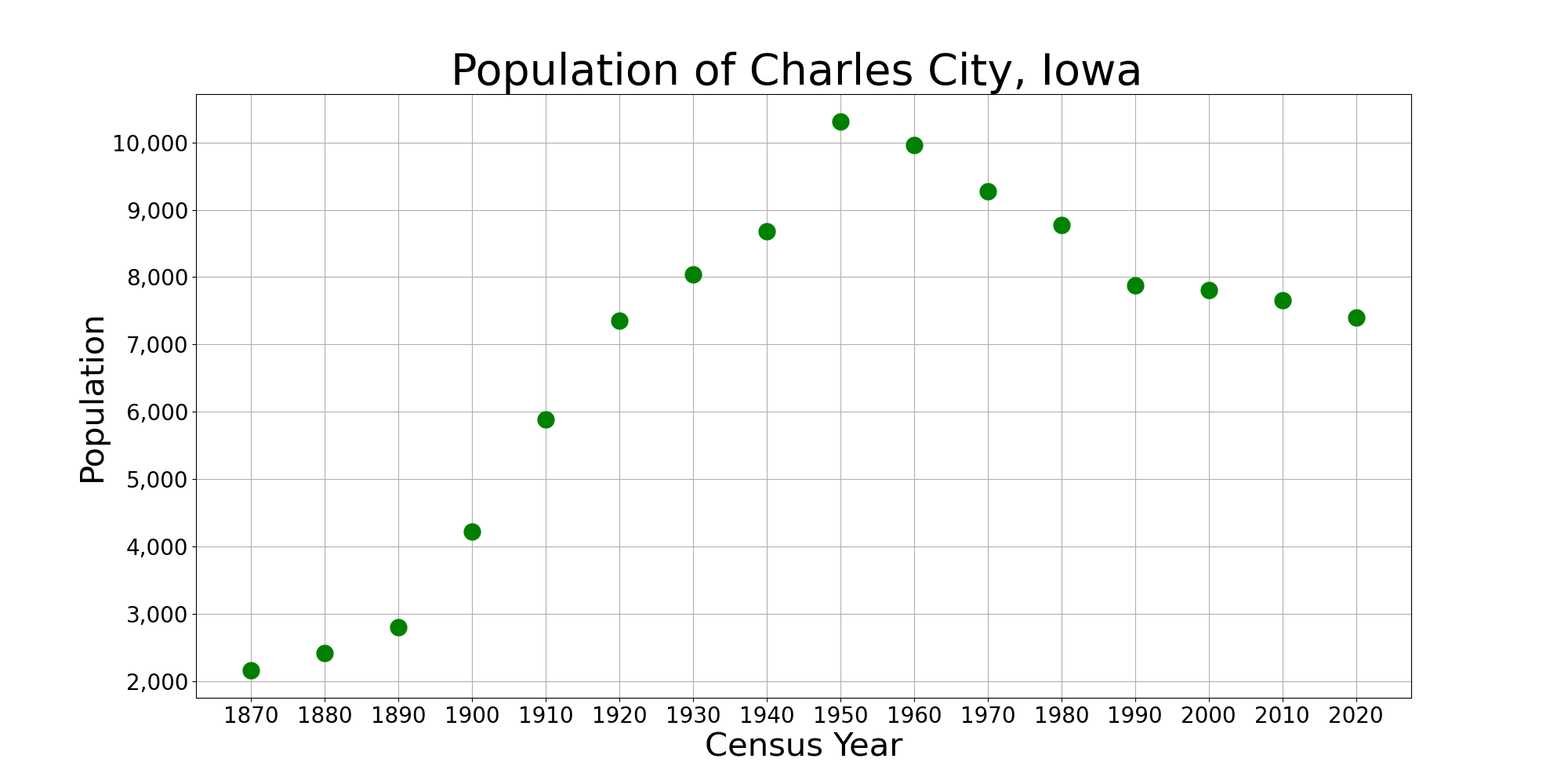
The population of Charles City, Iowa from US census data

=== 2020 census ===
As of the 2020 census, there were 7,396 people, 3,343 households, and 1,816 families residing in the city. The population density was 1,207.8 inhabitants per square mile (466.3/km^{2}). The median age was 42.6 years.

23.0% of residents were under the age of 18. For every 100 females, there were 92.0 males, and for every 100 females age 18 and over, there were 89.0 males age 18 and over. 96.5% of residents lived in urban areas, while 3.5% lived in rural areas.

Of the city's 3,343 households, 24.9% had children under the age of 18 living in them. 38.3% were married-couple households, 6.8% were cohabitating couples, 22.6% were households with a male householder and no spouse or partner present, and 32.3% were households with a female householder and no spouse or partner present. 45.7% of households were non-families, 40.8% of all households were made up of individuals, and 19.3% had someone living alone who was 65 years of age or older.

There were 3,716 housing units, of which 10.0% were vacant. The homeowner vacancy rate was 2.8% and the rental vacancy rate was 12.8%.

The age distribution was 25.1% under the age of 20, 4.6% from 20 to 24, 22.5% from 25 to 44, 24.8% from 45 to 64, and 23.0% who were 65 years of age or older. The gender makeup of the city was 47.9% male and 52.1% female.

Racial composition as of the 2020 census
Race	Number	Percent
White	6,255	84.6%
Black or African American	368	5.0%
American Indian and Alaska Native	13	0.2%
Asian	268	3.6%
Native Hawaiian and Other Pacific Islander	1	0.0%
Some other race	140	1.9%
Two or more races	351	4.7%
Hispanic or Latino (of any race)	385	5.2%

=== 2010 census ===
As of the census of 2010, there were 7,652 people, 3,440 households, and 1,964 families residing in the city. The population density was 1,230.2 inhabitants per square mile (475.0/km^{2}). There were 3,761 housing units at an average density of 604.7 per square mile (233.5/km^{2}). The racial makeup of the city was 92.7% White, 2.5% African American, 0.2% Native American, 2.5% Asian, 0.1% Pacific Islander, 1.0% from other races, and 1.1% from two or more races. Hispanic or Latino of any race were 2.6% of the population.

There were 3,440 households, of which 26.5% had children under the age of 18 living with them, 42.5% were married couples living together, 10.5% had a female householder with no husband present, 4.1% had a male householder with no wife present, and 42.9% were non-families. 38.7% of all households were made up of individuals, and 19.1% had someone living alone who was 65 years of age or older. The average household size was 2.15 and the average family size was 2.86.

The median age in the city was 42.9 years. 23% of residents were under the age of 18; 7.7% were between the ages of 18 and 24; 21.7% were from 25 to 44; 24.5% were from 45 to 64; and 23.1% were 65 years of age or older. The gender makeup of the city was 47.0% male and 53.0% female.

=== 2000 census ===
As of the census of 2000, there were 7,812 people, 3,339 households, and 2,083 families residing in the city. The population density was 1,269.9 inhabitants per square mile (490.3/km^{2}). There were 3,597 housing units at an average density of 584.7 per square mile (225.8/km^{2}). The racial makeup of the city was 96.92% White, 0.44% African American, 0.15% Native American, 0.65% Asian, 0.19% Pacific Islander, 0.79% from other races, and 0.86% from two or more races. Hispanic or Latino of any race were 2.12% of the population.

There were 3,339 households, out of which 27.5% had children under the age of 18 living with them, 48.3% were married couples living together, 10.6% had a female householder with no husband present, and 37.6% were non-families. 34.1% of all households were made up of individuals, and 18.7% had someone living alone who was 65 years of age or older. The average household size was 2.22 and the average family size was 2.82.

Age spread: 23.2% under the age of 18, 7.3% from 18 to 24, 23.5% from 25 to 44, 21.9% from 45 to 64, and 24.1% who were 65 years of age or older. The median age was 42 years. For every 100 females, there were 84.1 males. For every 100 females age 18 and over, there were 79.8 males.

The median income for a household in the city was $30,568, and the median income for a family was $38,297. Males had a median income of $29,536 versus $19,904 for females. The per capita income for the city was $16,659. About 8.5% of families and 11.2% of the population were below the poverty line, including 14.6% of those under age 18 and 5.6% of those age 65 or over.

== Education ==
Charles City is served by the Charles City Community School District, which includes the Charles City High School. There were two former institutions called Charles City College, the first a Methodist college that was absorbed into Morningside College in the 1910s, and the second a short lived branch of Parsons College in the late 1960s.

The Charles City Public Library hosts the Mooney Art Collection, a set of original art prints by Rembrandt, Dali, Picasso, and Goya.

== Media ==
Charles City is served by the following local media outlets:

Radio

- KCHA-FM 95.9 – North Iowa's Best Variety!
- KQOP-LP 94.7 FM, Charles City Educational Association
- KCHA-AM Fabulous 1580 – The Fab Oldies Channel!

Newspaper

- Charles City Press

TV

- KIMT, CBS 3
- KAAL, ABC 6
- KWWL, NBC 7

== Notable people ==
- Jeff Betts (born 1970), three time Soccer All Star and the 2000 World Indoor Soccer League Coach of the Year
- Pansy E. Black (1890–1957), science fiction and fantasy writer
- Phil Cade (1916–2001), racing driver
- Carrie Chapman Catt (1859–1947), president of the NAWSA, founder of the League of Women Voters and IAW
- Robert Coover (born 1932), author and academic
- James E. Gritzner (born 1947), United States federal judge
- Charles Walter Hart (1872–1937), Hart-Parr Gasoline Engine Company, coined the word tractor
- Mark Kuhn (born 1950), politician and Iowa State Representative from the 14th District
- Vive Lindaman (1877–1927), professional baseball player who pitched in the Major Leagues from 1906 to 1909
- Marlys Millhiser (1938–2017), author of mysteries (Charlie Greene series) and stand-alone horror novels, such as The Mirror
- George Nelson (born 1950), astronaut participated in three missions
- Henry Otis Pratt (1838–1931), two-term Republican U.S. Representative from Iowa's 4th congressional district
- Paul F. Riordan (1920–1944), WWII veteran, received the Medal of Honor for his actions in World War II during the Battle of Monte Cassino
- Helen M. Schultz (1898–1974), founder of the Red Ball Transportation Company, originally headquartered in Charles City
- Susie Smith (born 1960), runner-up on Survivor: Gabon
- Robert James Waller (1939–2017), author of the 1992 best-selling novel The Bridges of Madison County
- Wimpy Winther (born 1947), professional football player in the National Football League from 1971 to 1972

== See also ==
- Floyd County Court House
