= Helen M. Schultz =

American intercity bus entrepreneur (1898–1974)

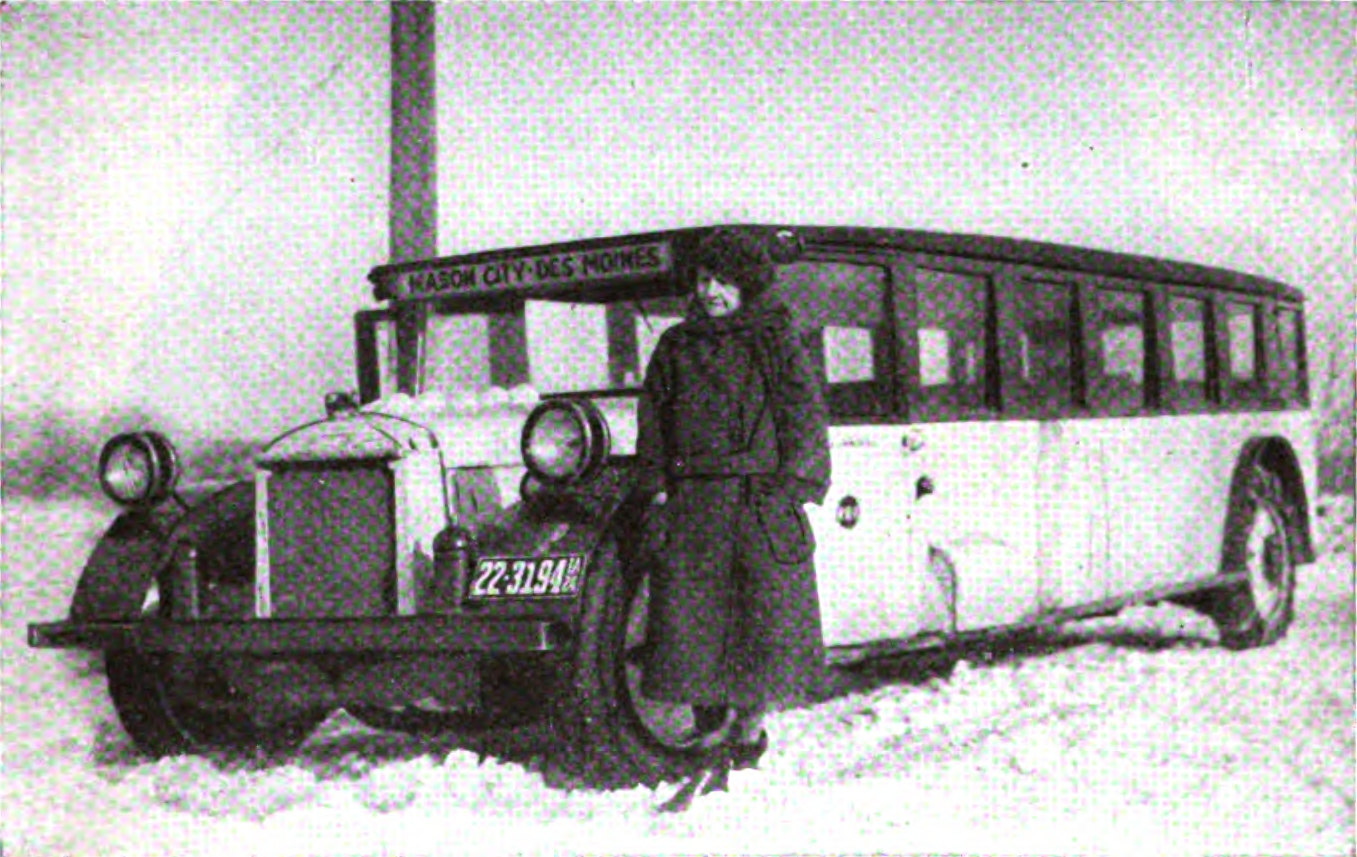
- Schultz posing with one of her buses, circa 1924
- Born: Helen Mary Schultz; February 12, 1898
- Died: March 8, 1974 (aged 76); Cascade, Iowa
- Other name: Helen Schultz Brewer

Helen M. Schultz (February 12, 1898 – March 8, 1974) was an American intercity bus entrepreneur, nicknamed "Iowa's Bus Queen." Schultz grew up in the Midwest, and recognized a need for bus service in Iowa. In 1922, she founded the Red Ball Transportation Company, which operated a large route network in northern Iowa until 1930, when Schultz sold it to the Jefferson Highway Transportation Company.

== Family and education ==
Helen Mary Schultz was the second child of Joseph Schultz and Mary Schultz, who were farmers in the region of Nashua, Iowa, and Shell Lake, Wisconsin. After finishing school, she attended a business college in Duluth, Minnesota, where she trained as a stenographer. She worked at various businesses, from some of which she gained useful knowledge about the transportation industries.

In 1925, she married Donald Brewer, who later became a farmer. They had two children, Donald and Mary.

== Business career ==
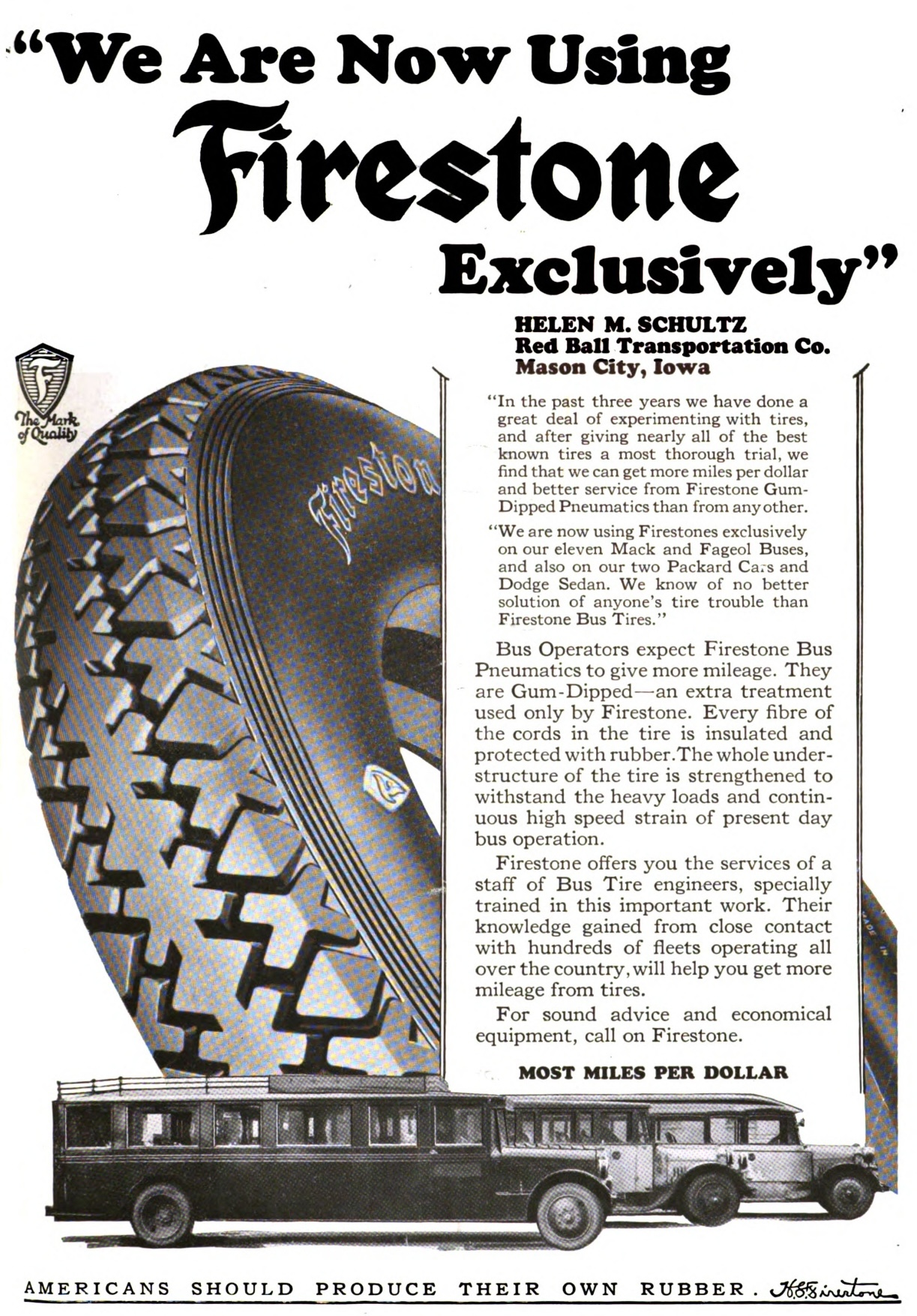
Firestone tire advertisement from May 1925, quoting Schultz

In the 1920s, the U.S. bus transportation industry was in its formative years, and bus companies were small businesses, often family owned and usually started by men. Schultz decided she wanted to start her own bus company in Iowa. Banks of the day rarely made business loans to women, so Schultz raised crucial capital from a building contractor named Emmett Butler, for whom she had worked at one time. In 1922, she incorporated as the Red Ball Transportation Company, which she named after the Red Ball Route (U.S. Highway 218), which runs between St. Paul, Minnesota, and St. Louis, Missouri. Schultz started operations on a modest scale, with one bus making twice-daily round-trips between Charles City and Waterloo.

At the outset, Schultz served as general manager of the company as well as its bookkeeper and mechanic. She ran into many early difficulties, such as bad roads, breakdowns, and thin ridership. Her first driver was her brother and he quit almost immediately, though he later re-entered the business as a partner. She persevered and in her first year of business acquired two more buses and added trips between Waterloo and Mason City, a regional trading hub.

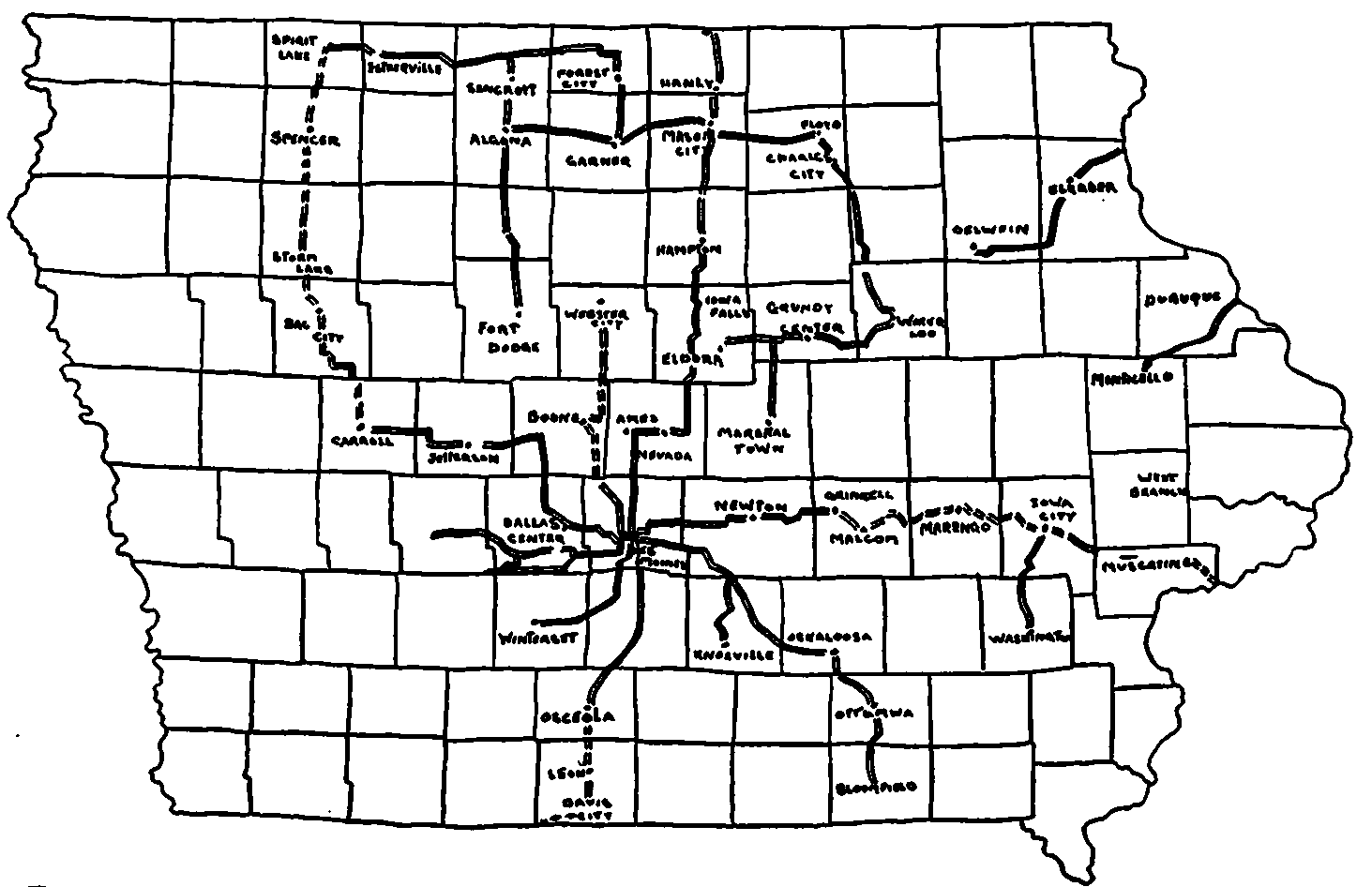
Map of bus lines in Iowa in August 1925

Schultz quickly acquired direct competitors such as the Speedway Motor Coach Company. The established railroads also saw her as a potential competitor and involved her in costly legal battles over route rights, some of which she lost. In the continuing fight with the railroads, she turned to publicity to aid her cause, promoting herself as a plucky upstart, and it was in this period that the Des Moines Register nicknamed her the "Iowa Bus Queen." Winning a crucial favorable ruling from the Iowa Board of Railroad Commissioners, Red Ball continued to grow; and by the fall of 1923 it was the leading bus company in Iowa, with 11 large coaches and a reputation for reliability. By the late 1920s, it had routes extending through the northern half of the state, connecting such cities as Des Moines, Mason City, Charles City, Waterloo, Spirit Lake, and Algona.

In the later 1920s, Red Ball's expansion plans stalled while transportation-related taxes (e.g. wheelage taxes) and competition increased, and it began losing money. Red Ball's buses were aging and Schultz did not have the capital to invest in new ones or in necessary buildings like ticket offices, waiting rooms, and garages. On top of this, an emergent cadre of interstate bus companies posed a new threat to companies like Red Ball. In 1930, Schultz decided to sell her company to the Minnesota-based Jefferson Highway Transportation Company, the predecessor of the modern-day Midwestern bus operator Jefferson Lines.

Schultz moved on to other ventures, including an auto service station, and eventually inherited her father's farm. She died in 1974 in Cascade, Iowa.
