= Pansy E. Black =

American stenographer and writer

Pansy Ellen Beach (November 26, 1890 – December 12, 1957), known by the pen name Pansy E. Black, was an American stenographer and writer of science fiction and fantasy.

== Personal life ==
Pansy Ellen Beach was born in Charles City, Iowa, in 1890. She was the daughter of Spencer Beach and Lillian E. Briggs Beach and had three older siblings: a sister, Daisy, and brothers, Leo and George. She married Texas legislator William Alexander Black in 1918. They had a son, Robert George Black. She was widowed when her husband died in 1935. Her son died in 1950; the following year, she accepted a Canadian War Service Medal awarded to her son posthumously for his service during World War II. She died in San Antonio, Texas in 1957, aged 67 years.

Black was active in a theosophy society in San Antonio. At a 1933 meeting, she lectured on future technologies, including wireless power and telephones. "We are only on the threshold of the electrical age," she declared. She predicted, "The time will come shortly when no man will have any privacy of any sort".

== Writing ==
Black's stories "The Valley of the Great Ray" (1930) and "The Men from the Meteor" (1932) were published by editor Hugo Gernsback in his Science Fiction Series booklets. "The Valley of the Great Ray" is a lost race tale, while "The Men from the Meteor" is a tale of alien invasion. Both stories are set in Australia and involve rays destroying a hidden, lost race or alien civilization. Her story "Graah, Foiler of Destiny" (1939) is a historical fantasy narrative set in Prehistoric times. "Graah, Foiler of Destiny" appeared in the short-lived magazine Golden Fleece Historical Adventure (1938-1939).

== Bibliography ==
=== Short fiction ===
- "The Valley of the Great Ray" (1930) (novelette)
- "The Men from the Meteor" (1932) (novelette)
- "Graah, Foiler of Destiny" (1939) (short story)
