= Douglas and Charlotte Grant House =

House in Cedar Rapids, Iowa

- U.S. National Register of Historic Places
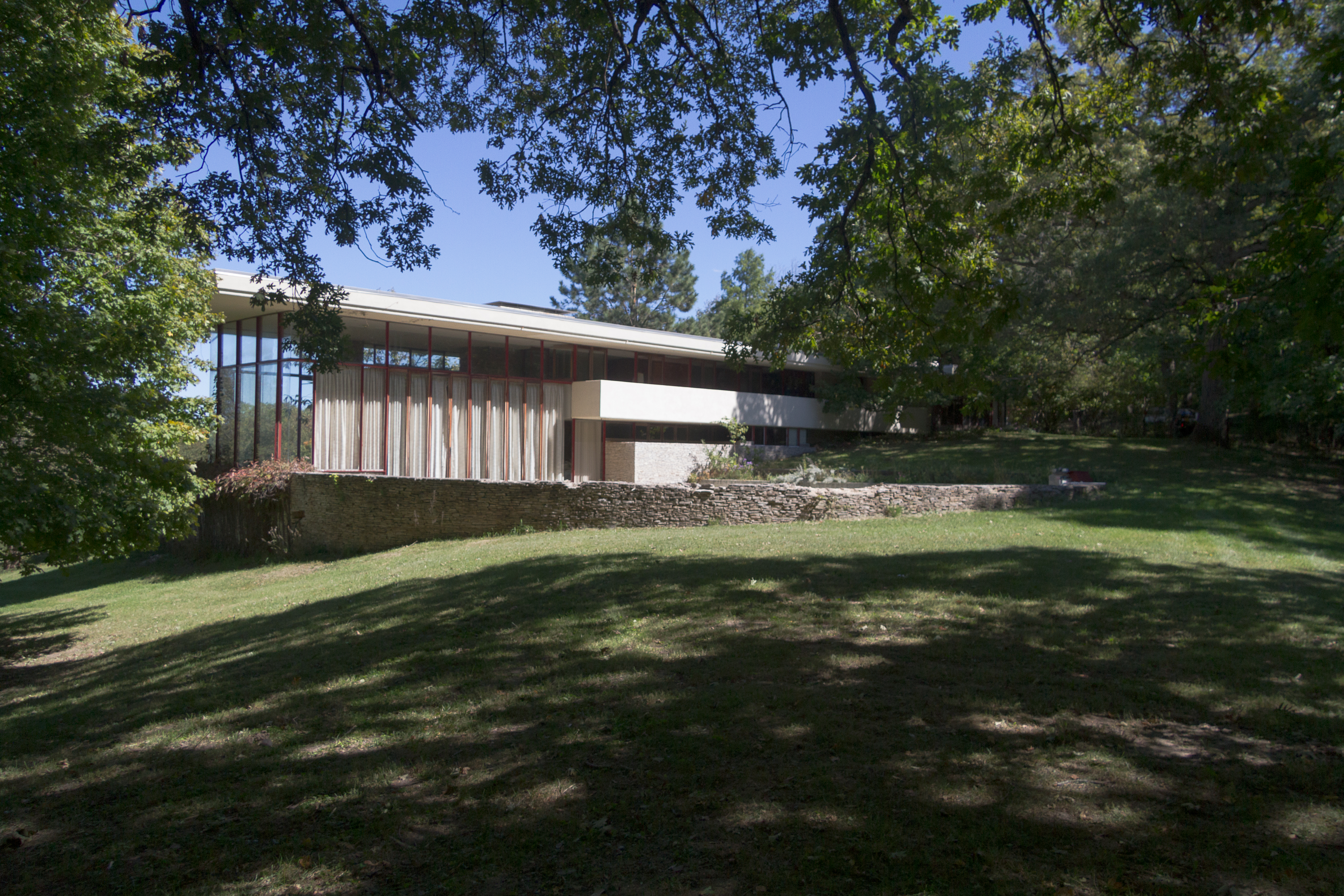

- Location within Iowa
- Location: 3400 Adel St., SE. Cedar Rapids, Iowa
- Coordinates: 42°0′40.4″N 91°37′21.4″W
- Area: 40 acres (16 ha)
- Built: 1949-1951
- Architect: Frank Lloyd Wright
- Architectural style: Usonian
- MPS: Iowa Usonian Houses by Frank Lloyd Wright, 1945-1960, MPS
- NRHP reference No.: 88002145
- Added to NRHP: November 9, 1988

The Douglas and Charlotte Grant House is a historic building located in Cedar Rapids, Iowa, United States. Located on 40 acres (16 ha) of land, this Frank Lloyd Wright designed Usonian-style dwelling was constructed from 1949 to 1951, with some construction continuing to about 1960. This is one of the first houses in Iowa built in this style, having been completed a year after the Lowell E. Walter House located near Quasqueton, Iowa. The characteristics that mark this as a Wright-designed house include: the house integrated into the site and opened to the outdoors; the use of window walls and horizontal bands of windows; natural lighting and ventilation; use of natural materials; a horizontal emphasis in mass and proportion; a car port in place of a garage; slab-on-grade construction with radiant heat system embedded in the slab; a flat roof; an open-plan interior; varied ceiling heights on the interior; built-in furniture; and 3 large scale fireplaces with a central hearth. The limestone for the house was quarried by the owners on the property. The house was listed on the National Register of Historic Places in 1988.

== See also ==
- List of Frank Lloyd Wright works
- National Register of Historic Places listings in Linn County, Iowa
