= Cedar Rock State Park =

State park in Iowa, United States

- Southern facade of the Lowell Walter House

- Location within Iowa Location within the United States
- Location: Buchanan County, Iowa, United States
- Nearest city: Quasqueton, Iowa
- Coordinates: 42°24′22″N 91°46′12″W
- Area: 426 acres (172 ha)
- Established: 1982
- Administrator: Iowa Department of Natural Resources
- Website: www.iowadnr.gov/places-go/state-parks/all-parks/cedar-rock-state-park

Cedar Rock State Park is a 426-acre (172 ha) state park in Buchanan County near Quasqueton, Iowa, United States. The park's primary structure is the Lowell Walter House, also known as Cedar Rock, designed by Frank Lloyd Wright in the Usonian style for the local businessman Lowell E. Walter and his wife Agnes. The Walter House, a one-story residence, is constructed on a bluff above a bend of the Wapsipinicon River. The park also includes a gate, fireplace, and boathouse designed by Wright, as well as other visitor amenities such as a visitor center. The house is on the National Register of Historic Places.

Lowell Walter had become a successful businessman by 1942, when he contacted Wright to design a house at the site. Wright completed the design in 1945, but due to material shortages, construction did not begin until 1948. The house was completed in 1950 and, after hosting two public open houses, functioned as the Walters' summer home for three decades. After Walter died in 1981, he bequeathed the property to the state government, which opened it to the public in 1982. The visitor center was completed in 1989. The house has undergone several renovations since the state's takeover.

The Walter House has a facade of brick, walnut, and glass. Its reinforced concrete roof overhangs the main house, along with a carport and a separate maid's residence. Inside, the house is divided into two sections, arranged in a shape resembling a tadpole. One wing contains a living–dining room, while extending off at an angle is a bedroom wing with a kitchen, two bathrooms, and three bedrooms. Wright designed the furniture and picked out the furnishings. On the riverfront is the boathouse, a two-story structure with a similar exterior design to the Walter family's main house. The boathouse has a garage on its ground floor and a residence and terrace on its second floor.

== Grounds ==
Cedar Rock State Park is located at 2611 Quasqueton Diagonal Boulevard in Buchanan County near Quasqueton, Iowa. The park covers 426 acres (172 ha), of which 11 acres (4.5 ha) were formerly part of an estate owned by the local businessman Lowell E. Walter. The primary structure in the park is the Lowell Walter House, which occupies a limestone bluff known as Cedar Rock. The bluff, whose name predates the house's construction, sits along a bend on the Wapsipinicon River. The house, along with an entrance gate, outdoor fireplace, and riverfront boathouse, was designed by Frank Lloyd Wright. The river is about 40 feet (12 m) below the house and is visible to the house's west and south. A knoll, or small hill, rises northwest of the house and descends to the southeast.

Wright also designed the landscape immediately around the house, putting the utilities underground and deliberately excluding elements such as stepping stones and high trees. He planted 135 evergreens on the grounds away from the house, and he refused to add a railing next to a cliff, saying that it "would look like a New York park". To avoid visual distractions, Wright put all the utilities underground. Steps descend from the house to the river and are illuminated by low mushroom-shaped lamps. There are also several ponds near the house, one of which was originally used to irrigate the gardens.

On the knoll just above the house is a fireplace. Known as the Council Fire, it contains a circular brick pavement, in addition to a semicircular brick wall with seating areas. The Council Fire was designed to be able to accommodate an electronically operated spit. There is also a circular pool, with its own semicircular brick wall, on the slope south of the house.

Other parts of the park include a trail, visitor center, restrooms, and a picnic seating area. The visitor center, about 3/4 mile (1.2 km) from the Walter House, hosts special events and includes exhibits about Wright and the Walter family. From the visitor center, tractors drive tourists to the Walter House. The grounds host other events such as outdoor yoga and house tours. Large parts of the park were acquired primarily to function as a buffer zone around the Wright-designed properties. When the house was being built between 1948 and 1950, Wright had wanted two existing wood-frame buildings on the knoll above the house to be torn down. These structures were kept at Walter's insistence.

== History ==
Prior to the 19th-century arrival of American pioneers, the river bend and adjacent limestone bluff were prominent natural features for the native Sauk and Fox people. The house was built for Lowell Walter and his wife Agnes, who were both Iowa natives. Lowell, originally of nearby Independence, had played on Cedar Rock Bluff on the banks of the Wapsipinicon River as a child. He owned the Iowa Road Building Company, a road-paving company, between c. 1917 and 1944, and he started buying large tracts in Buchanan County, Iowa, during the 1930s. The house's architect, Frank Lloyd Wright, had received significant press coverage in the 1930s after completing Fallingwater, a house for the Kaufmann family in Pennsylvania. At the time, Wright designed houses mostly for well-off families, but he was also beginning to design lower-cost Usonian houses for middle-class families. In general, his Usonian houses tended to have open plans, geometric floor grids, in-floor heating, and a carport, without a garage or basement.

=== Development ===
By the 1940s, Lowell owned 17 farms in Buchanan County. The farms spanned about 3,800 acres (1,500 ha) in total, including 11 acres (4.5 ha) around Cedar Rock Bluff. Walter first became acquainted with Wright after paving roads near the architect's hometown of Spring Green, Wisconsin. He contacted Wright in 1942 to design a house on the Wapsipinicon River site. Walter sent a letter to the architect's Taliesin studio in Spring Green, inviting him to see the land. Wright reportedly was immediately impressed with the geography, and he later wrote Walter a letter that said simply: "We will design a dwelling for you. Send further details. There will be no basement nor any attic." The onset of World War II interrupted the development of most of Wright's buildings. Wright had completed his design by 1945, when the plans were published in the Ladies' Home Journal. (Note: The Architectural Forum wrote that Ladies Home Journal had featured the design in a 1942 issue.) The design called for a low, glass-walled house on a bluff overlooking the river. Wright also designed a gate at Agnes's request and a boathouse at Lowell's request.

Construction was delayed due to wartime restrictions that caused shortages of building materials. Work began in 1948, when Wright visited Quasqueton to discuss the plans with Lowell. W. F. Kucharo was hired as the building's general contractor. Ed Franks, a resident of Independence who helped operate three of Walter's farms, helped with construction. Edna Van Patten, the daughter of Lowell's brother, recalled that construction crews began working on the house the day after completing a gym in town. Wright cleared some of the existing landscaping on the site, using tons of dynamite to level the bluff. One laborer recalled that a small section of the bluff was preserved at the top of the knoll, and that many loads of earth were transported to the site to create lawns. Workers obtained material for the concrete from the river, mixing it by hand and then bringing it up the hill. After the concrete roof was poured, work was halted during late 1948 due to winter weather, resuming in April 1949. During construction, the Walters lived in a small building on the site.

The house was nearly completed by late 1949. During his lifetime, Walter never publicly disclosed the house's cost. Builders estimated the cost at up to $135,000 (equivalent to $1,405,000 in 2024), and another estimate pegged the cost at $126,000 (equivalent to $1,311,000 in 2024). The Iowa Department of Natural Resources (DNR) calculated that the house likely cost $125,000–150,000 (equivalent to $1,301,000–1,561,000 in 2024). For comparison, most American homes at the time cost no more than $10,000 (equivalent to $104,000 in 2024). The writers Charles and Berdeana Aguar attributed some of the high expenses to Wright's use of brick rather than locally-quarried limestone, which would have been less expensive.

=== Walter use ===
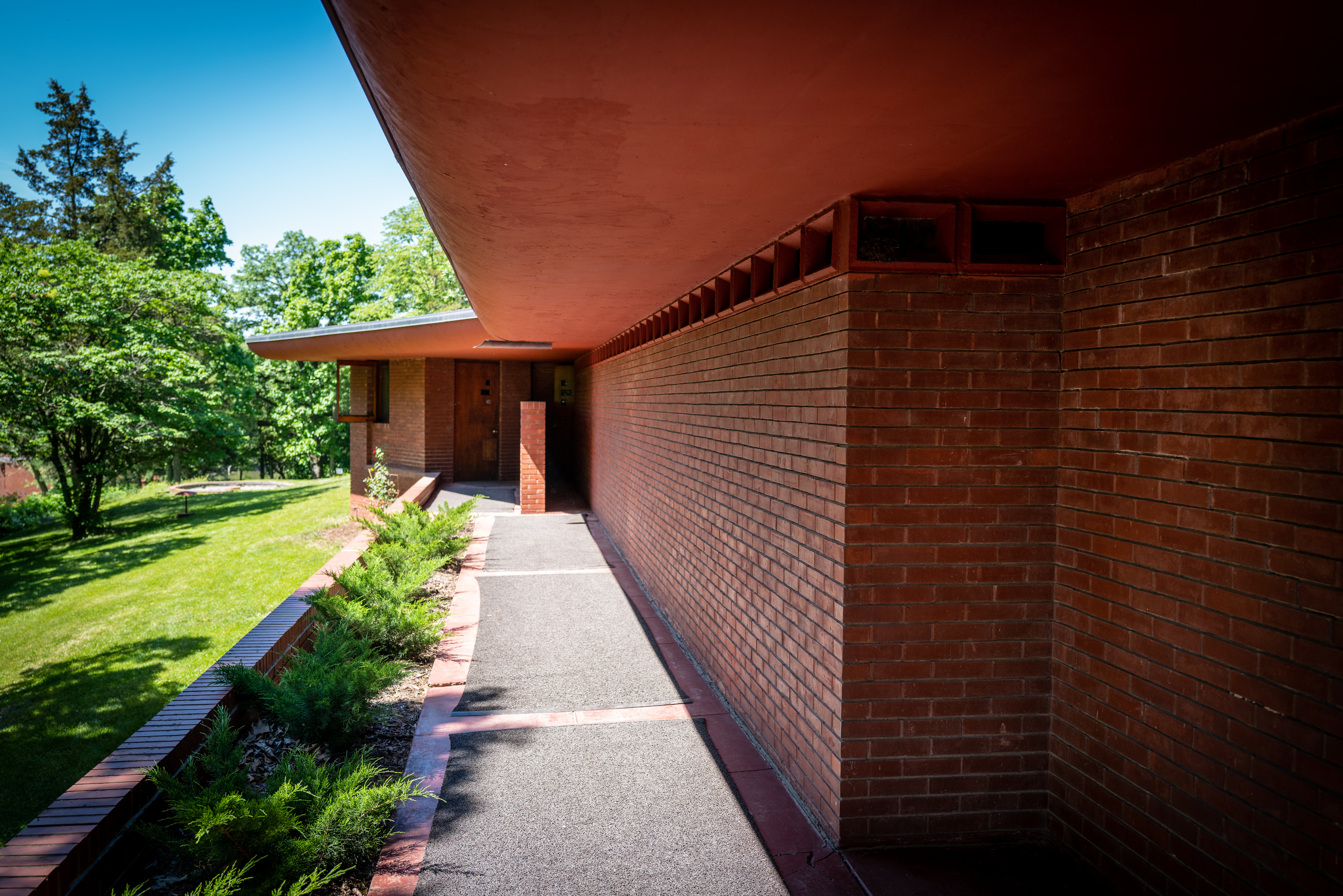
The roof eaves overhang from the facade.

Immediately before moving in, the Walters hosted two open house events for the public in late July 1950, selling tickets to raise funds for the Veterans Memorial Park Committee of Quasqueton. Both events sold over two thousand tickets, raising hundreds of dollars for the veterans' park, which opened in 1952. From the outset, the house was commonly known as Cedar Rock, and Wright also called it "Opus 497" based on an estimate of how many designs he had previously produced. Although the house could theoretically be used year-round, the couple used it only during the summers, staying in Des Moines during the winters.

The completed house attracted what the Cedar Rapids Gazette called "the attention of the architecture world". So many people came to see the house that Agnes wrote to her sister in California, saying that being in the house felt like she was sitting in a downtown Des Moines storefront. When he needed privacy, Lowell used the boathouse by the Wapsipinicon River, where he could call the tenants of his properties. The Walters' niece Edna began helping out with groundskeeping shortly after the house was completed; she continued to help maintain the grounds for over three decades, even after she got married and moved 60 miles (97 km) away in 1963. The Walters' other nieces also visited occasionally, during Christmas, and Walter often hosted barbecues for his neighbors. A former United States Navy soldier named Swede Reinhold, who had helped build the house, was its caretaker by the early 1970s. Before officially being hired in 1972, Reinhold had maintained the grounds part-time for a quarter-century.

The couple had no children and, as early as the late 1950s, were planning to give their house to the state government after their deaths. Walter sold his other land holdings in 1973 but maintained ownership of his house. Walter was 83 years old by 1979, prompting him to consider either selling the house or giving it to the state government. He ultimately agreed to bequeath the house to the state so it could be opened to the public. Walter's will stipulated that the home be donated to the DNR and opened to visitors. The will set up a trust fund for the house. The trust initially provided $1.5 million (equivalent to $4,368,000 in 2024) for the house's upkeep, allowing the house to operate without any charge to visitors. In exchange, Walter's name was required to remain on the property, and the house and grounds had to retain their appearance for 75 years.

=== Use as park ===
==== Opening, 1980s, and 1990s ====
Lowell Walter died in 1981. Though his will gave Agnes the right to continue living in the Walter House, she moved to Des Moines so the house could be opened to the public. She left most of the house's furnishings behind, except for some silverware, along with a casserole that was moved back to the Walter House after Agnes died in 1986. Walter's lawyer announced the details of his will in May 1982, including his gift of the Walter House to the Iowa government. The DNR accepted ownership of the house on June 22, with a ceremony attended by Governor Robert D. Ray; the Iowa Conservation Commission's director estimated that it was the largest gift the commission had ever received. At the time, the concrete floor had settled, and the roof was leaking, but the state planned to repair the house. Before the park opened, the commission documented the house's original furnishings and created an informative brochure. The state kept the original appliances such as the house's original telephone, and it displayed 1950s-era objects such as magazines in the house.

Cedar Rock opened as a state park on September 4, 1982, and recorded over 8,000 visitors in its first operating season. At the time, the Walter House was Wright's only house in Iowa open to the public; the Stockman House in Mason City became the second such house over a decade later. Due to the Walter House's small size, capacity was limited to two tour groups of 20–25 people at one time. The house also had a one-lane driveway and limited parking, so the commission wanted to widen the driveway and add a parking lot; in the meantime, visitors had to take a shuttle bus from Quasqueton. In conformance with Walter's will, brochures about the house described it as the Walter Residence; however, traffic signs directing to the house referred to it solely as "Cedar Rock". Shortly after opening, the Walter House was added to the National Register of Historic Places in 1983.

The Cedar Rapids Gazette wrote that the house was initially a "relatively undiscovered treasure" with small, friendly tour groups. By the mid-1980s, the state government was restoring the house. Workers repaired the exterior, and they fixed the leaky roof and replicated the original furnishings and floors. Agnes died in 1986 and left another $500,000 for the trust fund, most of which the DNR used to acquire 200 acres (81 ha) as a buffer zone for the house. With some money from the Walters' trust fund, the DNR began constructing a visitor center at Cedar Rock State Park in 1988. The agency also built a parking lot. The visitor center, which cost $130,000, opened in September 1989. The visitor center was attracting 100 extra visitors a week by 1990, compared with before its construction. By then, the house had 15,000 annual visitors. The trust spent about $200,000–250,000 annually on the house, and money from the fund was used to replace the boiler and repair the roof twice.

==== 2000s to present ====
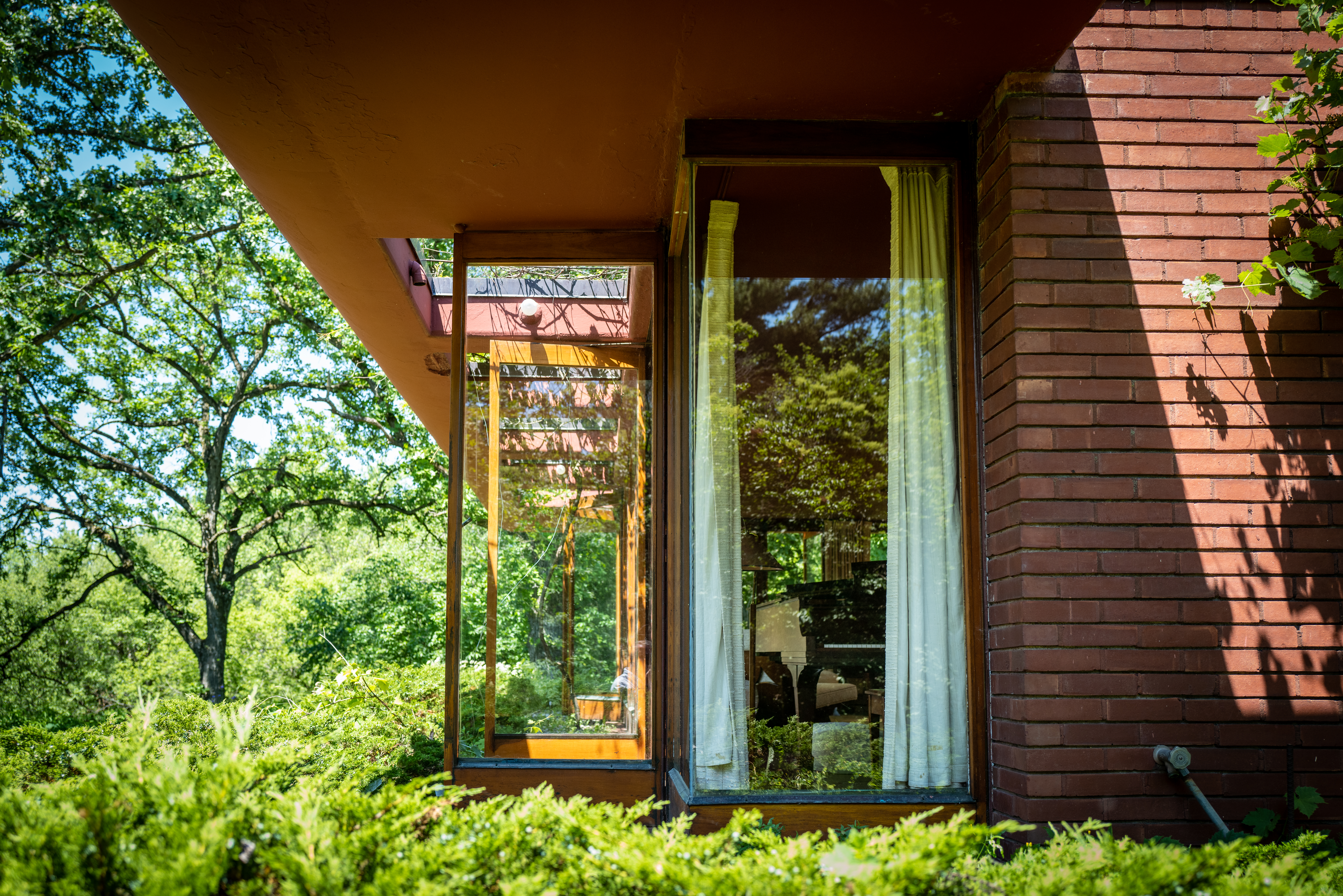
Window detail

In 2003, the DNR selected a logo for Cedar Rock State Park following a design competition. The house was hosting hourlong guided tours during months when it was open to the public, and it also hosted exhibits, such as a 2008 showcase of Wright's Iowa house designs. The Walter Charitable Trust still owned the house and provided funds for it, but the trust fund had been nearly depleted by 2009. At the time, the site cost $300,000 to operate and earned $20,000 in revenue each year. This prompted the state to take over responsibility for funding. The DNR proposed buying 185 acres (75 ha) of surrounding farmland—which the trust had previously acquired as a buffer zone—to help replenish the trust fund's finances. In the long run, the DNR wanted to develop a mixed-use waterfront trail and a campground in the area. Due to statewide budget cuts, by 2010 the DNR had fired three of the park's five seasonal employees and reduced the house's operating hours.

The Friends of Cedar Rock, a 501(c)(3) charity, was founded to help with the house's maintenance. During 2010, the DNR collected $12,000 in visitor donations for repairs to the boathouse, which had fallen into disrepair due to rain seepage. The Friends of Cedar Rock began raising funds for the boathouse in 2012; by then, the state government lacked money to fund the repairs. As part of the boathouse restoration, the woodwork and the exterior concrete and bricks were replaced. The Friends of Cedar Rock completed the boathouse's renovation in 2017 for approximately $200,000, receiving grants from local and state foundations and the Walters' trust funds. The Walter House accommodated about 10,000 annual visitors by the 2010s and 12,000 annual visitors by the early 2020s.

During the COVID-19 pandemic in 2020, the house was temporarily closed to the public, and the Friends of Cedar Rock commissioned a virtual tour of the house. The portion of the park near the Wapsipinicon River was restored in 2022 as part of a flood management project along the river. The Friends of Cedar Rock received a $50,000 state grant to finance further restoration work in 2025. This allowed the organization to repair the house's masonry and retaining walls; this project was planned to cost $370,000 and be finished in 2027.

== House ==
- Lowell E. Walter House
- U.S. National Register of Historic Places
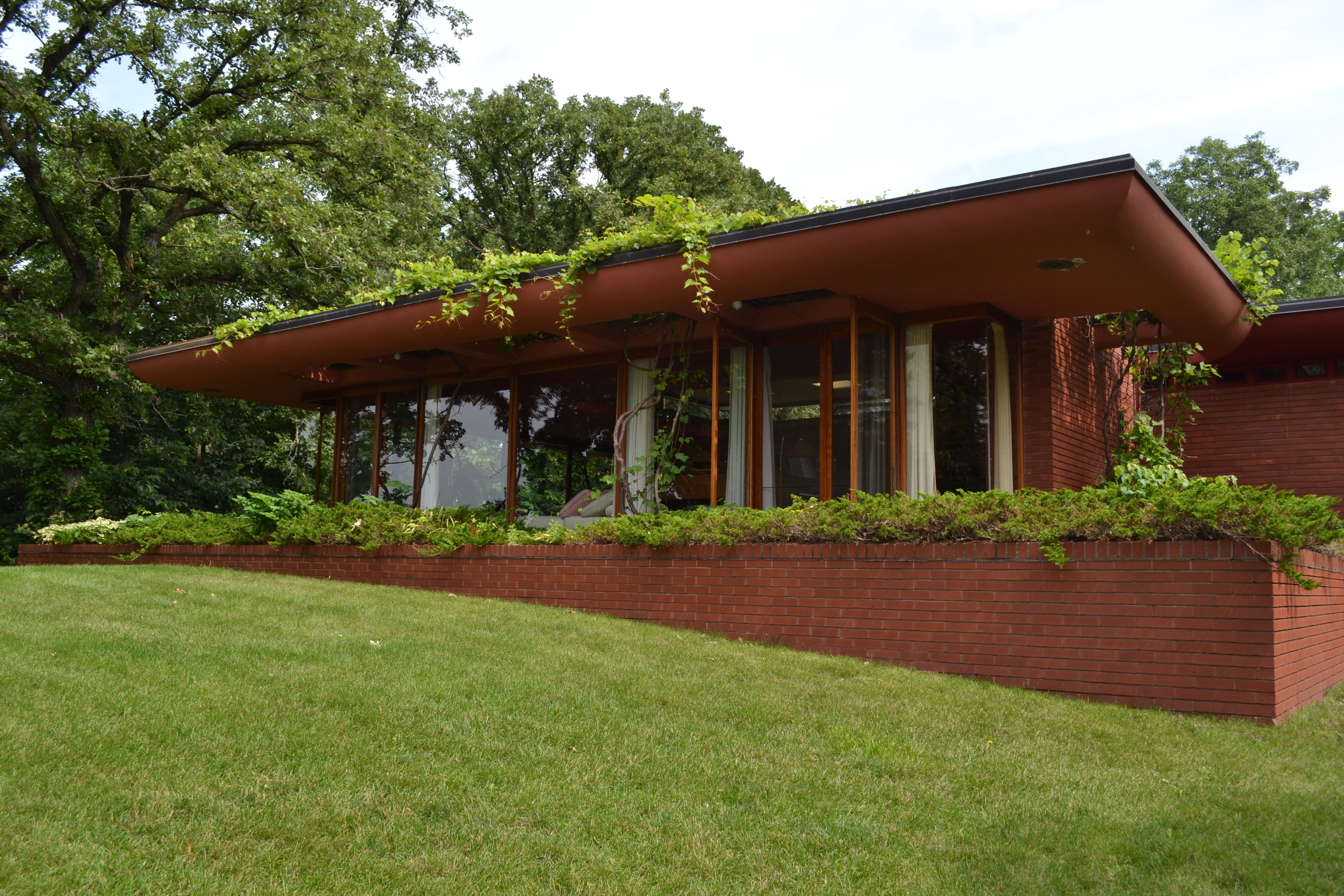

- Location within Iowa Location within the United States
- Coordinates: 42°24′22″N 91°46′13″W
- Area: 1,800 ft^{2} (170 m^{2})
- Built: 1948
- Architect: Frank Lloyd Wright
- Architectural style: Usonian
- MPS: Iowa Usonian Houses by Frank Lloyd Wright, 1945-1960, MPS (AD)
- NRHP reference No.: 83000345
- Added to NRHP: March 2, 1983

The Lowell Walter House was designed by Frank Lloyd Wright in the Usonian style. It was one of eight houses Wright designed in Iowa. (Note: Some sources describe Iowa as having seven total Wright-designed houses, while the Frank Lloyd Wright Foundation states that this figure refers to Usonian houses only.) Along with works such as the Grant, Lamberson, Stockman, Sunday, and Trier houses, it was one of eleven buildings he designed in the state. Wright had intended for the house's design to allow the Usonian ideal of "living simply and in harmony with nature". Unlike Wright's other projects, the Walter House did not follow precepts of organic architecture; for example, it was not built around the existing terrain and did not use locally-quarried limestone.

The Walter House is one story high. Similar to other Usonian houses, Wright deliberately avoided adding a basement or attic, which he regarded as "dust collectors". Its layout is arranged in a tadpole shape. The house measures about 150 feet (46 m) long from end to end. (Note: One source gives a length of 146 feet (45 m), and another cites a length of 156 feet (48 m).) The "head" of the tadpole contains the living–dining room, and the "tail" contains the bedroom wing, which extends to the northeast of the living–dining wing. A gravel driveway leads about 1/2 mile (0.80 km) from the east, terminating at a carport next to the bedroom wing. The carport, a canopy design that Wright used in place of a garage in his Usonian works, can fit two vehicles. A retaining wall adjoins the house.

The Walter House is generally open to the public between May and October of each year. The adjoining maid's residence, which shares a roof with the house, is rarely open.

=== Exterior ===
==== Facade ====
The exterior is made primarily of brick, walnut, and glass. There are more than 110,000 bricks, which are used in the house's foundation and exterior walls. The exterior walls are double-layered; each layer is 4 inches (100 mm) thick and separated by a small gap. The bricks are laid so that their 8-by-2.5-inch (203 by 64 mm) stretcher sides are facing outward. To emphasize horizontal design details, Wright originally wanted horizontal and vertical joints to use mortar in different colors, but the builders hesitated. Instead, the entire house was constructed with conventional gray mortar, and after the brickwork was finished, the vertical joints were made flush with the bricks and were painted red. To illuminate the interior, individual bricks were omitted at selected points along the walls, and colored glass from Corning Inc. was installed in the resulting gaps.

The Walter House's main entrance is on the eastern elevation. It consists of a walnut door, accessed by a terrace raised about 5 feet (1.5 m) from the ground. The entrance terrace has a concrete floor and brick retaining walls and is sheltered by an extension of the roof. The house also has a service door, also made of walnut. On the opposite end of the house, an open-air terrace adjoins the living–dining room's north wall. Portulaca from Brazil was planted just outside this terrace.

The house's doors and windows both have walnut frames. The living–dining room and bedrooms have full-height, single-paned windows, which have copper troughs at their bottoms to collect condensation. The windows are separated by red-painted T-columns, made of 14 short tons (13 long tons; 13 t) of steel. There are also six sets of glass French doors, each of which has an interior screen door behind it. The closet next to the entrance and the hallway to the bedrooms, both on the eastern elevation of the facade, have smaller clerestory windows near the roof. The Walter House also has a red tile with Wright's signature, which was added five years after the house's completion. It is similar to other signature tiles on some of Wright's other buildings, which he generally added only to buildings he was proud of; the Walter House is his only Iowa work with a signature tile.

==== Roof ====
The roof slab, made of reinforced concrete, contains 17 short tons (15 long tons; 15 t) of rebar and is 7 to 10 inches (180 to 250 mm) thick. It is supported by brick walls inside and by the T-columns embedded into the facade. The roof's eaves protrude 5 feet (1.5 m) from the living–dining room's walls. The eaves above the entrance and carport are as much as 10 feet (3.0 m) deep, and the eaves above the bedrooms are shallower. The eaves are interrupted by skylights, creating trellises to allow natural light in; the trellises are shaded by vines during the summer, and the vines let in sunlight when they lose their leaves during the winter. The soffits, or underside, of the eaves are painted red and curve upward at their edges. There are openings for pipes to drain water off the roof.

The roof extends past the bedroom wing to cover the carport and the maid's residence. The roof slab is interrupted by three brick chimneys: one above the master bedroom and two near the living–dining room's fireplace. Parts of the roof are raised above the main roof, and clerestory windows are inserted between the two levels. Early plans for the house also called for a roof garden.

=== Interior ===
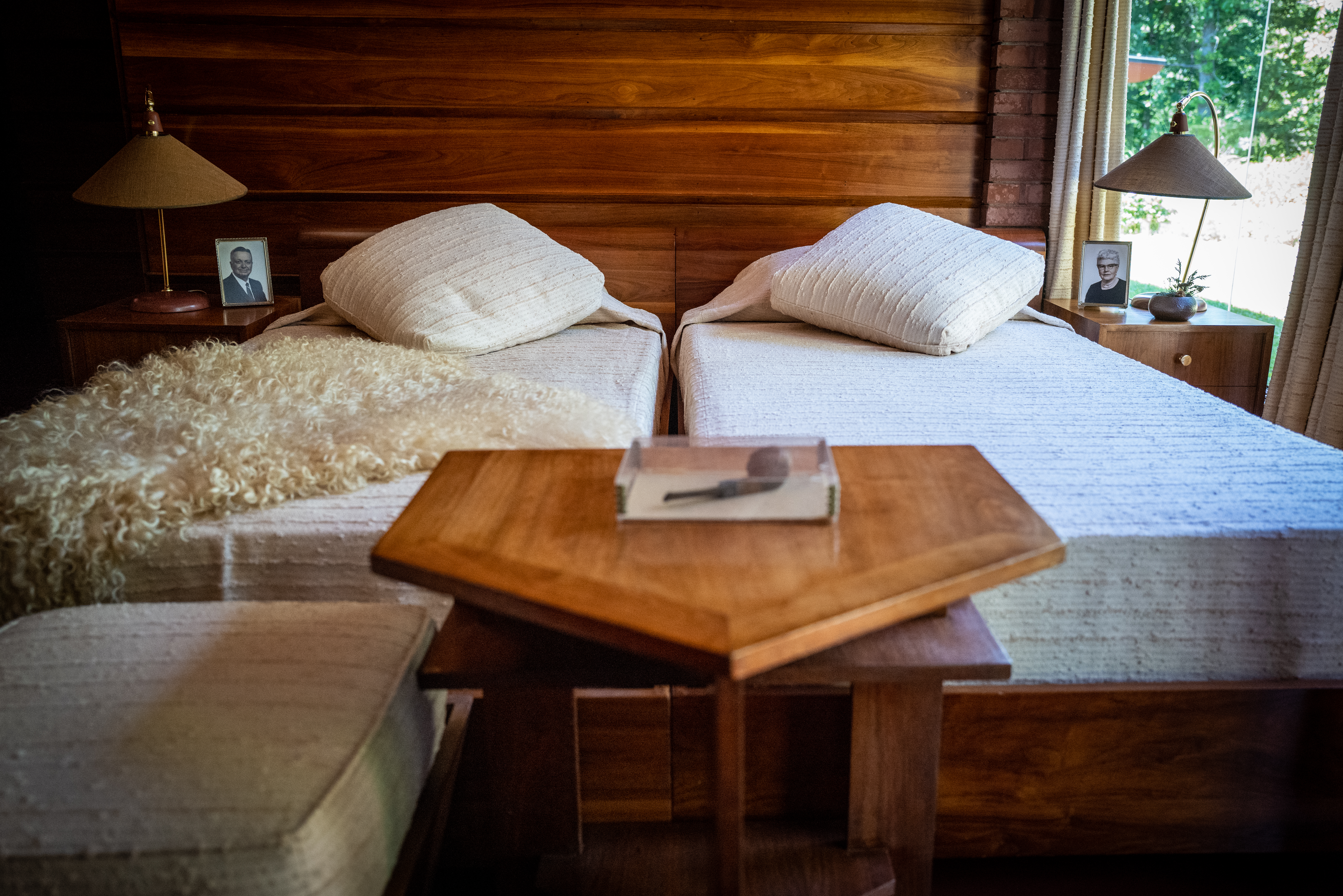
A pentagonal table in a bedroom

The Walter House covers about 1,800 square feet (170 m^{2}), and, excluding the maid's residence, has three bedrooms and two bathrooms. Like Wright's other Usonian designs, the floor plan is divided into zones, namely the living–dining room and bedroom wings. The floor plan is arranged around a grid of squares measuring 63 inches (1,600 mm) wide, (Note: National Park Service 1983, p. 5, describes the units as measuring 62 inches (1,600 mm) wide.) and all dimensions are based on multiples of units or half-units. The floor is composed of red concrete panels, each measuring one unit wide and half a unit across; the panels weigh 175 pounds (79 kg) and could be lifted to allow access to the heating system. Wright used brown floor coverings, which were cut into multiple rectangular sections so they could be easily replaced.

The Walter House's perimeter walls and some interior walls are made of brick, while other rooms have wooden partitions. Throughout the house are swinging walnut doors, while the closets have folding screens made of vertical boards. Though contemporary sources wrote that Wright did not use materials such as paint or plaster in the house, the National Park Service wrote that the ceilings were made of plaster. The ceilings generally measure about 7 3/12 feet (2.2 m) tall, one foot lower than contemporary houses' ceilings. Underneath the raised portions of the roof, the ceiling heights increase to 9 feet (2.7 m). Wright used indirect illumination throughout the house, such as fluorescent tubes in coved ceilings below the clerestory windows.

Since Wright disliked how clients' own furniture would clash with his designs, he also designed the Walter House's furnishings and furniture. This included a large amount of walnut cabinetry and bronze hardware. The furniture was built to small dimensions, since both the Walters were of short stature. Wright selected objects such as statuary and books based on how well they complemented the design, and he also ordered specific items such as pots and glassware for similar reasons. Wright did not let the Walters hang their own pictures, as he wanted them to enjoy the riverside views. He selected the plantings, such as gesneriaceae, dieffenbachia, and philodendron; plants added to the house later are descended from the originals. Many of the original decorations remain in place. The Walters' possessions, including clothing, tools, and a dog toy, are also on display.

==== Mechanical system ====
Wright did not include any forced-air heating or cooling system in the Walter House. Instead, the house was built with a gravity heating system, consisting of pipes embedded in gravel beneath the concrete floor. Heat from the slabs, and from convection heaters near the floor, rises to the ceiling where it is ventilated through the clerestory windows. The heating system is divided into two zones, controlled by thermostats in the living–dining room and the master bedroom. The gravity heating system did not distribute warm air evenly, but this did not inconvenience the Walters, who used the house only during the summer. Cross-ventilation could also be provided by breezes passing through the full-height glass doors.

The house is also equipped with water, sewage, and electrical ducts; water is supplied by a nearby well, while sewage is collected in a septic tank. Each of the bathrooms has a "Pullman"-style combination sink, bathtub, and toilet, which share cold-water supply, hot-water supply, and sewage pipes. The sinks in each bathroom were placed on movable boxes running above the toilets and bathtubs, so that either the toilet or bathtub (but not both) could be used simultaneously. Wright did not use this bathroom configuration elsewhere.

==== Rooms ====
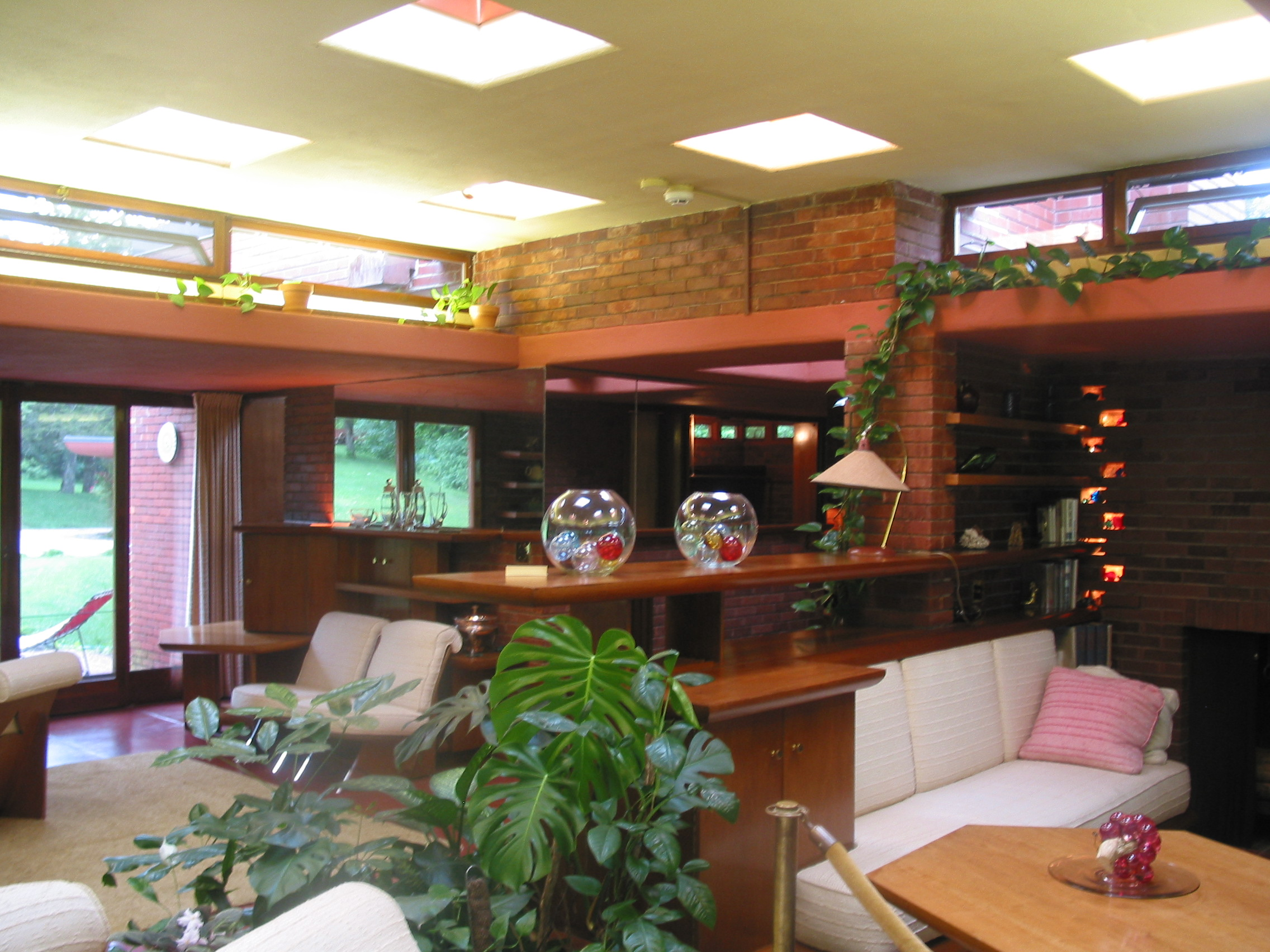
The house's living–dining room

The entry hall leads directly into the east wall of the living–dining room and has a built-in walnut counter. The living–dining room (also known as the garden room) is square in plan, measuring about 900 square feet (84 m^{2}). (Note: Several sources write that the room measures 32 by 32 feet (9.8 by 9.8 m) across, but this would result in an area of 1,024 square feet (95.1 m^{2}).) It receives natural light from glass walls on the west and south, which overlook the river, and from nine square skylights in its ceiling. In the living–dining room are walnut shelves, a buffet table next to the kitchen, and a built-in counter. The room contains custom furniture, including two hexagonal dining tables that could be combined to form a larger table. There is also a brick fireplace on the east wall, with a sunken hearth. The wheat-colored upholstery was intended to complement the yellow-green, cedar, and chartreuse color scheme. Wright also incorporated a "garden floor" in the living–dining room, where plants could be grown, next to the terrace on the northern wall. There are also plants placed over a divan, dividing the room into two sections. The room has a Steinway piano, custom-designed by Steinway & Sons to avoid obstructing views.

The bedroom wing extends northeast off the living–dining room at a 120-degree angle from the north wall (30 degrees clockwise from the living–dining room's grid). From south to north, the bedroom wing includes part of the kitchen, the first bathroom, two smaller bedrooms, another bathroom, and the master bedroom. The kitchen, just off the living–dining room's northeast corner, was part of what Wright labeled as the "workspace". It has linoleum countertops, revolving Lazy Susans, a rotating work shelf, and cupboards. Also in the workspace is a slightly sunken utility area with a dryer, oil and water tanks, and equipment. The utility area and kitchen are separated by a half-height walnut partition. There are three skylights above the workspace's ceiling.

All of the bedrooms and the bathroom are accessed by a hallway running along the eastern elevation, measuring 52 feet (16 m) long. The hallway is illuminated by the clerestory windows on the facade and has storage spaces at each end, as well as cabinets and shelves on its outer wall. Each bedroom could also be accessed by the French doors. The Walters used the master bedroom, while the two smaller bedrooms were for guests. For upholstery and drapes, Wright used a chartreuse color scheme in the guest bedrooms and a natural color palette in the master and maid's bedrooms. The guest bedrooms each have a built-in dressing table, wardrobe, and nightstand; the smaller bedroom to the south has a single bed, and the larger one to the north has a double bed. The master bedroom has its own fireplace, which has brick detailing. Also in the master bedroom are twin beds and a built-in dressing table. The detached maid's bedroom has its own bathroom and is similar in design to the other rooms. There is a tool room adjacent to the maid's bedroom.

== Boathouse ==
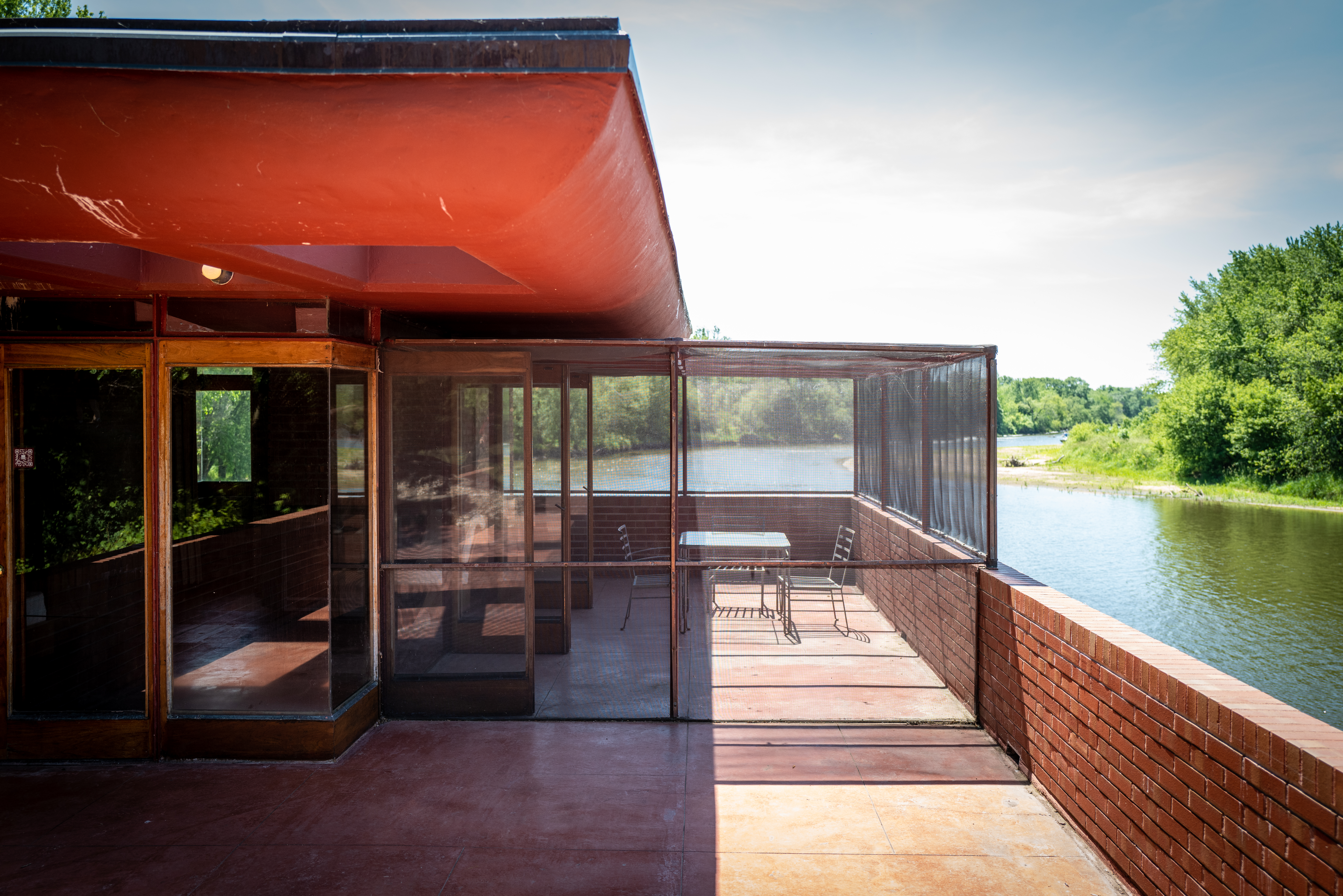
The upper-level terrace of the boathouse

On the riverfront is a two-story boathouse, which was also designed by Wright. It is one of five boathouses that Wright designed during his lifetime and is one of two that were built as part of an original Wright design, rather than at a later date. Unlike the main house, the boathouse is rarely open to the public. The boathouse is built atop a large boulder. The exterior is similar to that of the main house, being made of brick and walnut, with a flat concrete roof.

There is a boat garage on the lower level, which is accessed by a ramp leading to the water. The boathouse's upper level has a residence, which includes a guestroom with a bathroom, kitchenette, and fireplace. The guestroom has walnut cabinets and cupboards on one wall, a chair, a bed, and a desk recessed from the room's center. The fireplace has an electrical outlet for an oil-burning stove. An exterior concrete staircase leads to a second-floor terrace. To withstand flooding, the terrace was placed above the river's highest known level at the time of the house's construction. Part of the terrace is enclosed by a metal-pipe railing and can be used for sleeping.

== Reception ==
The under-construction house was depicted in Architectural Forum and Ladies' Home Journal magazines. The Forum said the curved roof helped link the house with its site and that Wright's liberal use of glass demonstrated "how the sense of space can be introduced without loss of the sense of shelter". When the house was completed, the Des Moines Register wrote that it looked "as if it has grown by nature's magic, instead of by man's hand", and the Waterloo Daily Courier wrote that Wright had succeeded "in giving the Walters absolute seclusion". Another Iowa newspaper, the Hardin County Index, called the house "strictly out of a fairy book". In the late 1970s, the Waterloo Courier wrote that the house "is plain lovely, with an exterior of clay-red brick and low-slung roof, jutting dramatically into the white wilderness that surrounds it". Sydney Robinson, an Iowa State University professor who wrote about Wright's work, called the house "beautiful and extraordinary" despite being extravagant.

After the house became part of a park, the Quad-City Times wrote that the house "bears the unmistakable stamp of Wright", and the Register said that the "spirit of the design tyrant still abounds". The Times wrote that, though some features such as passive heating, folding closet doors, and a combined living–dining room were forward-looking, the small master bedroom and bathroom were dated. During the 2000s, The New York Times wrote that the house "records a time when [Wright's] work had far more in common with an Austin Powers set than Louis Sullivan's department store", in reference to the Carson Pirie Scott store designed by Wright's mentor Louis Sullivan, and the Globe Gazette said that "Wright's social philosophy of naturalism sings in this usonian". The Register wrote in 2010 that the house's small size belied the quality of the design details and their arrangement. Another observer wrote in 2023 that "everything about this house is compact and efficient" but that the small dimensions of spaces such as the hallway were also claustrophobia-inducing.

== See also ==
- List of Frank Lloyd Wright works
- National Register of Historic Places listings in Buchanan County, Iowa
