= List of census-designated places in Iowa by population =

Map of the United States with Iowa highlighted

Iowa is a state located in the Midwestern United States that is divided into 99 counties and contains 62 census-designated places (CDPs). All population data is based on the 2010 census.

== Census-designated places ==
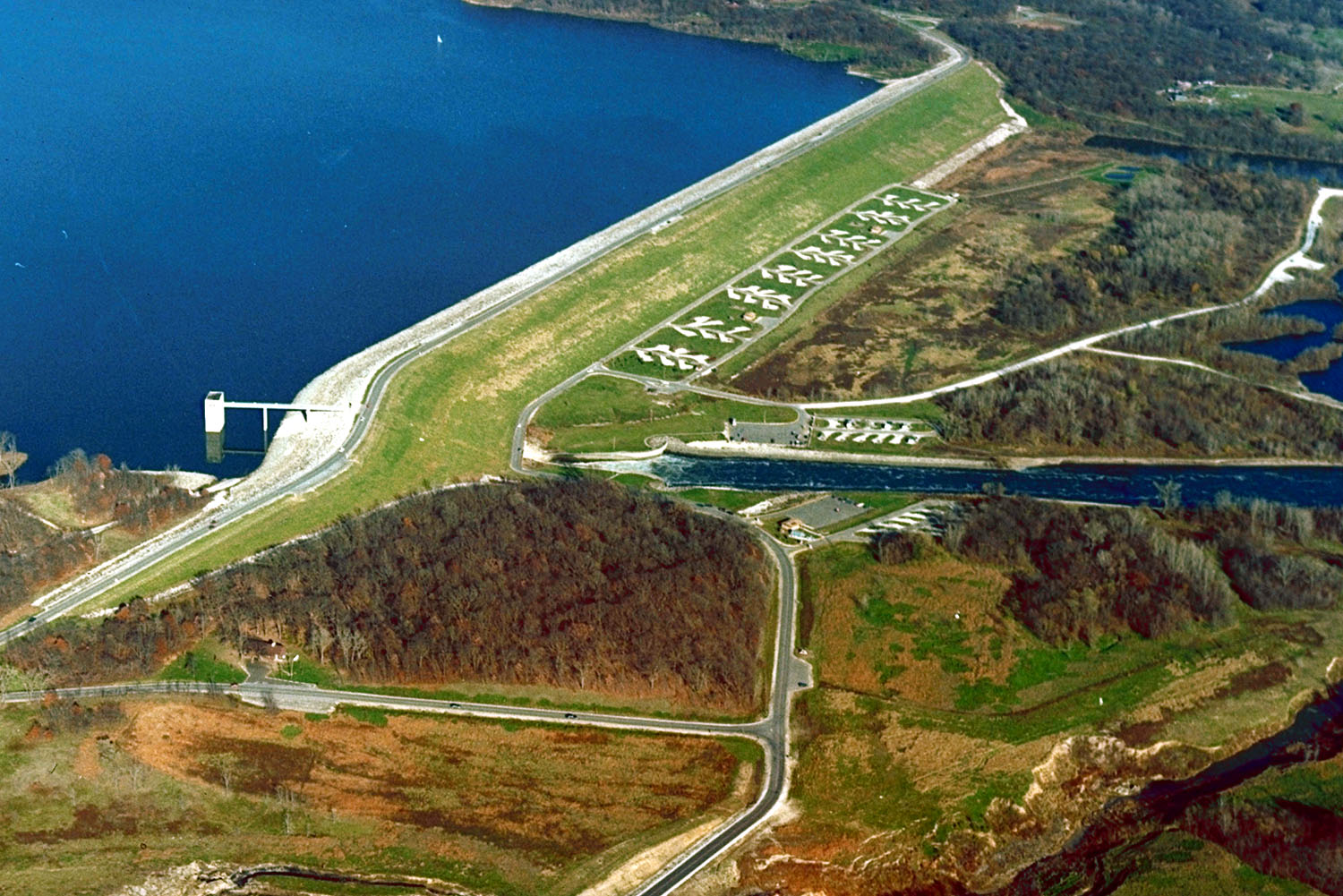
Saylorville Dam on Saylorville Lake

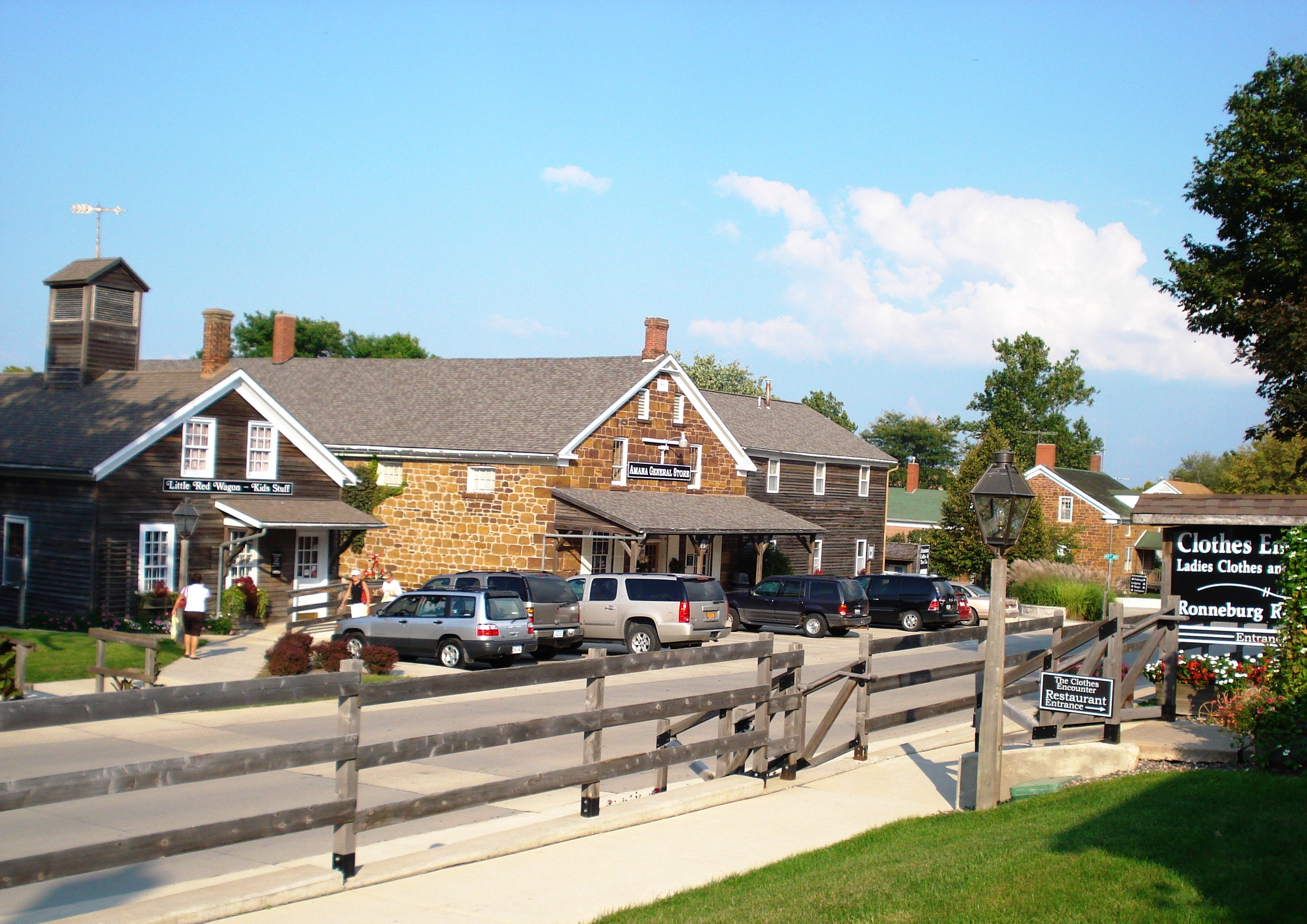
Amana

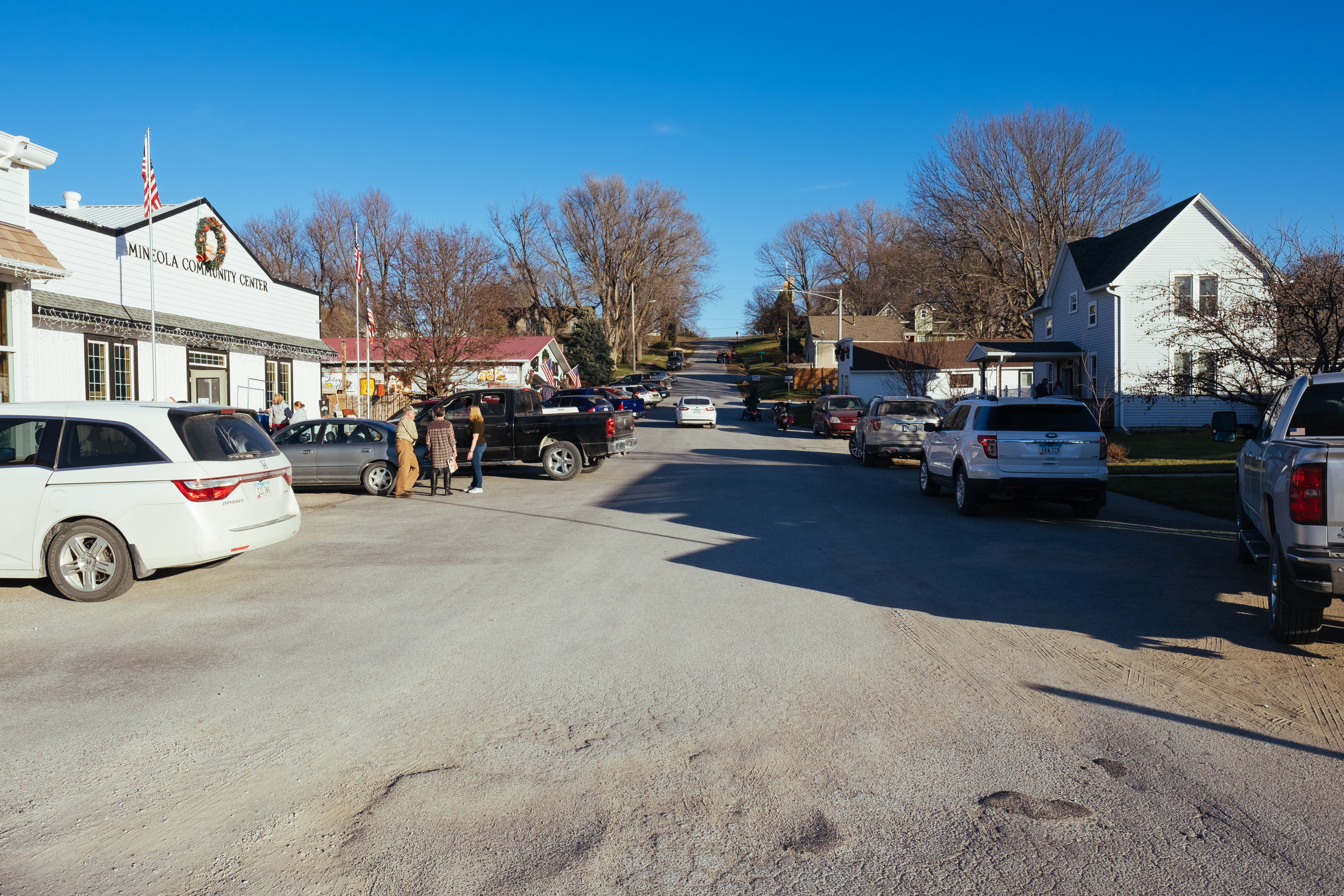
Main Street in Mineola

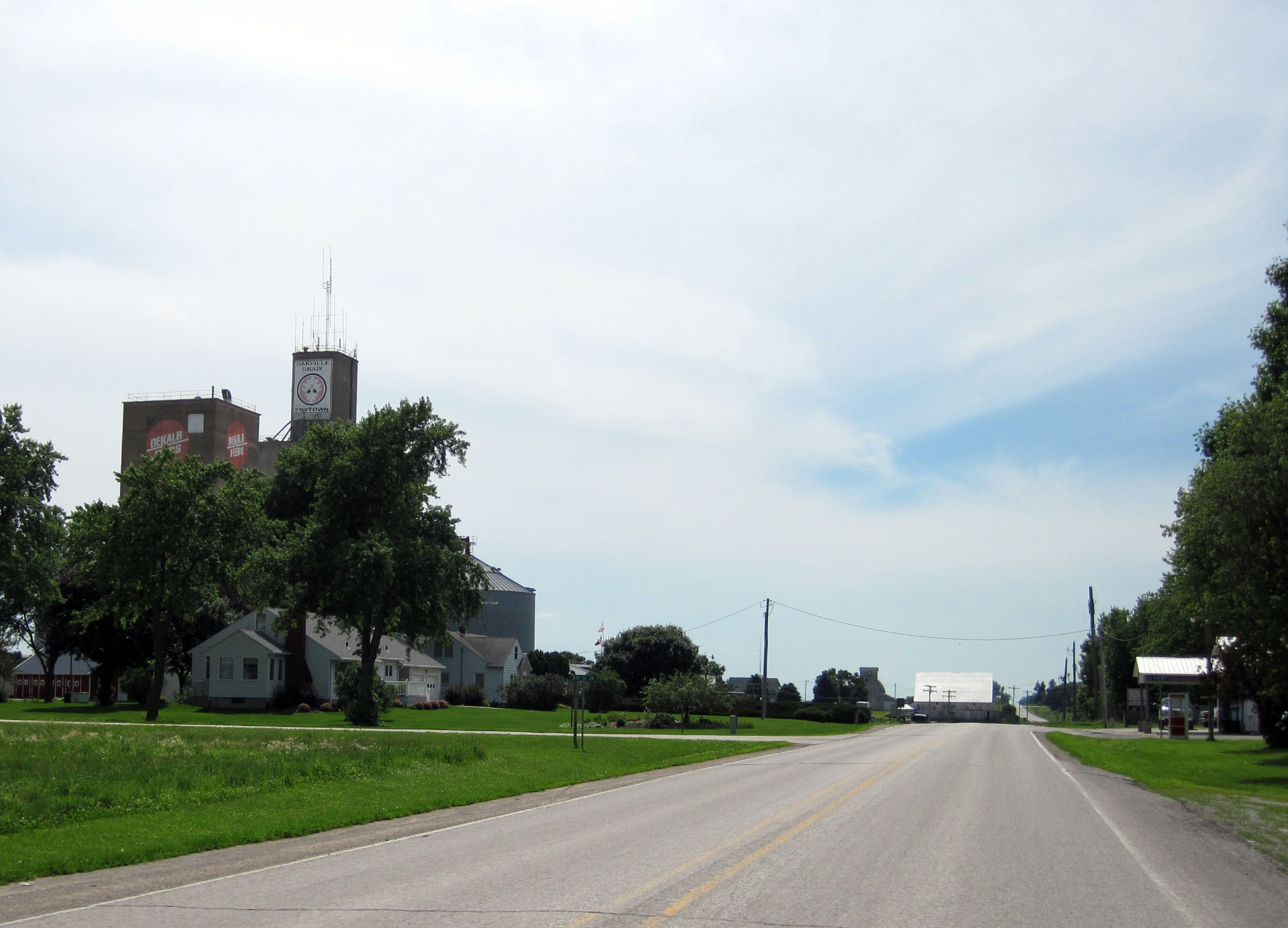
Frytown

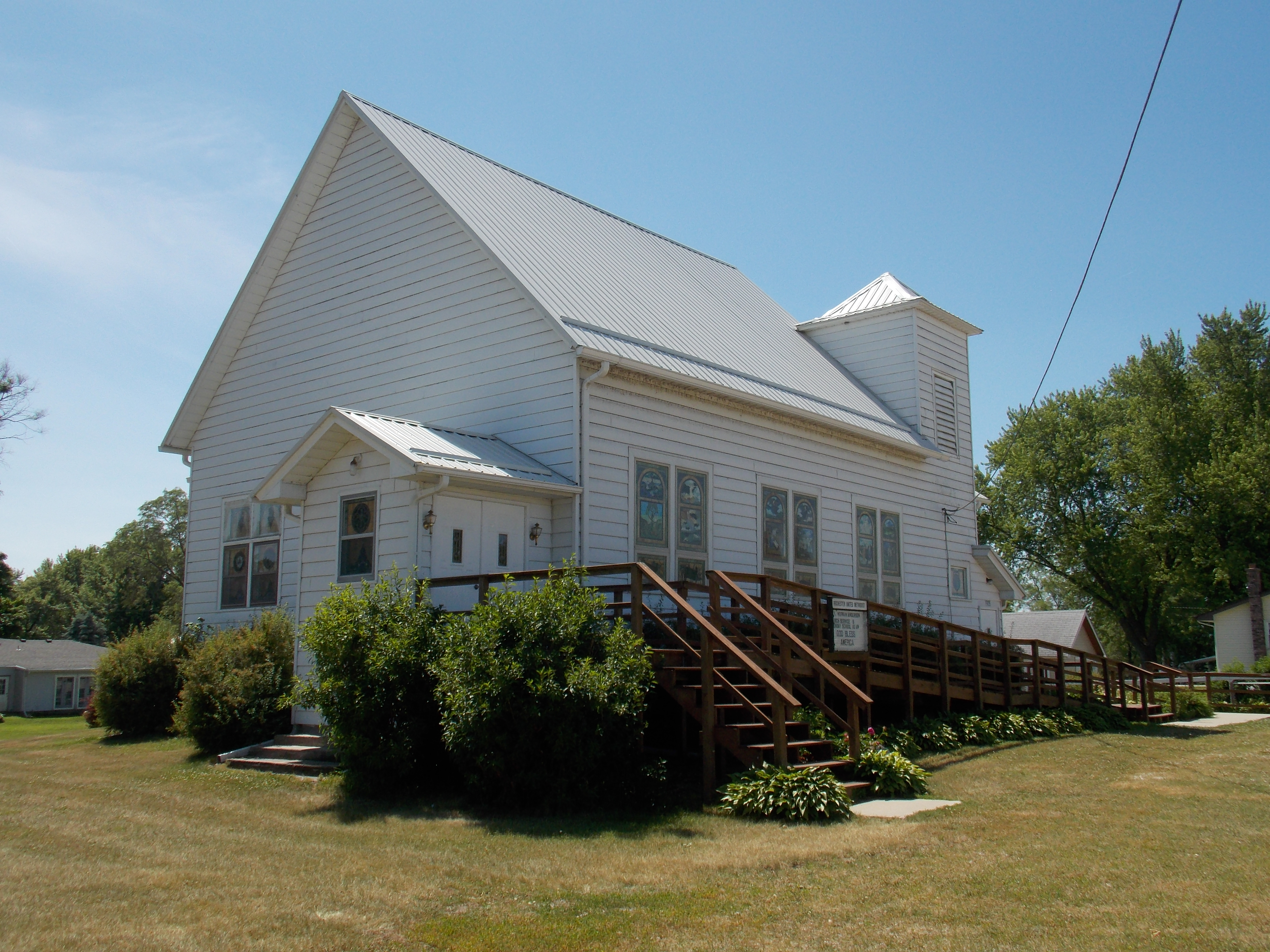
Rochester United Methodist Church

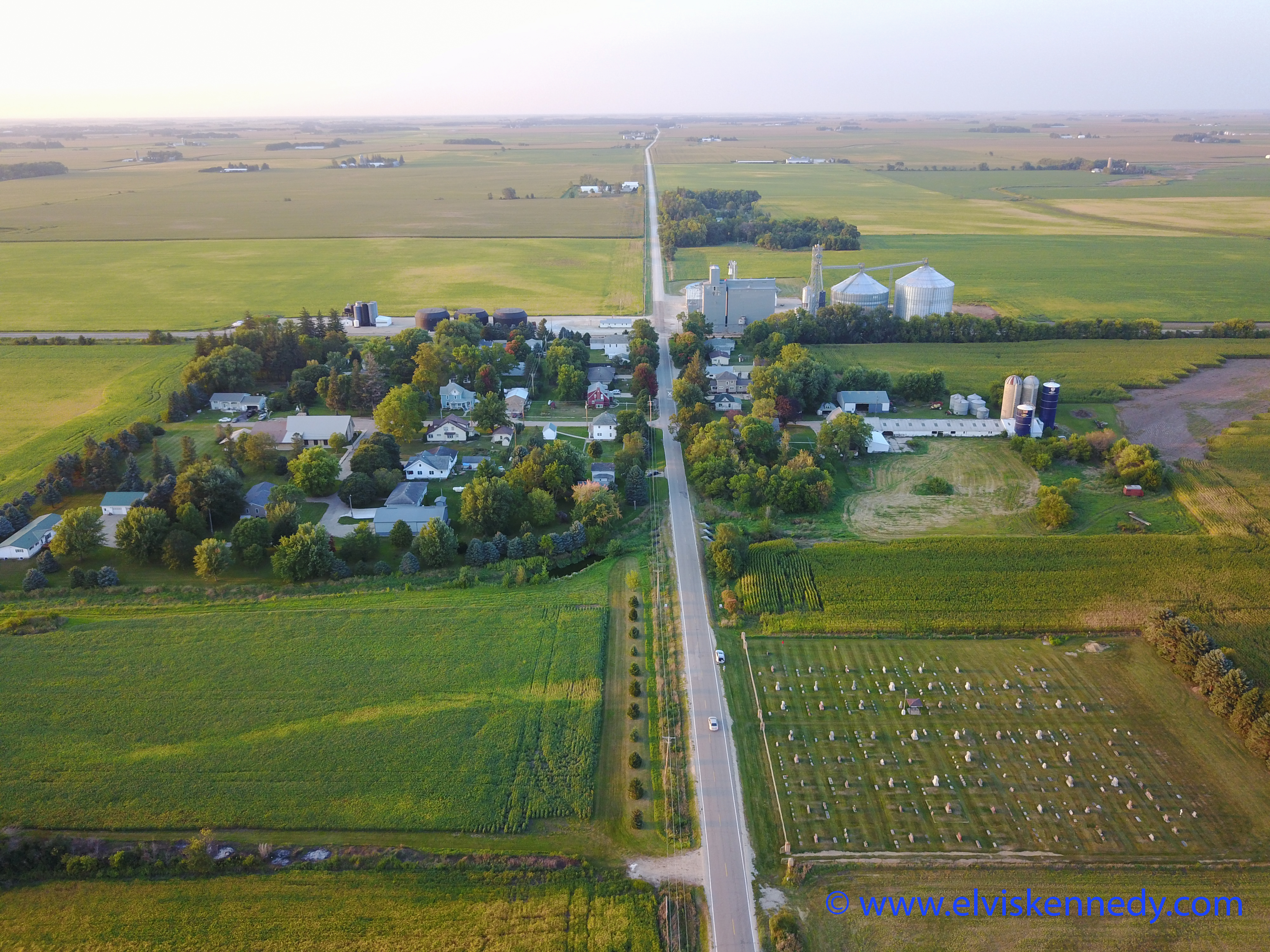
Toeterville

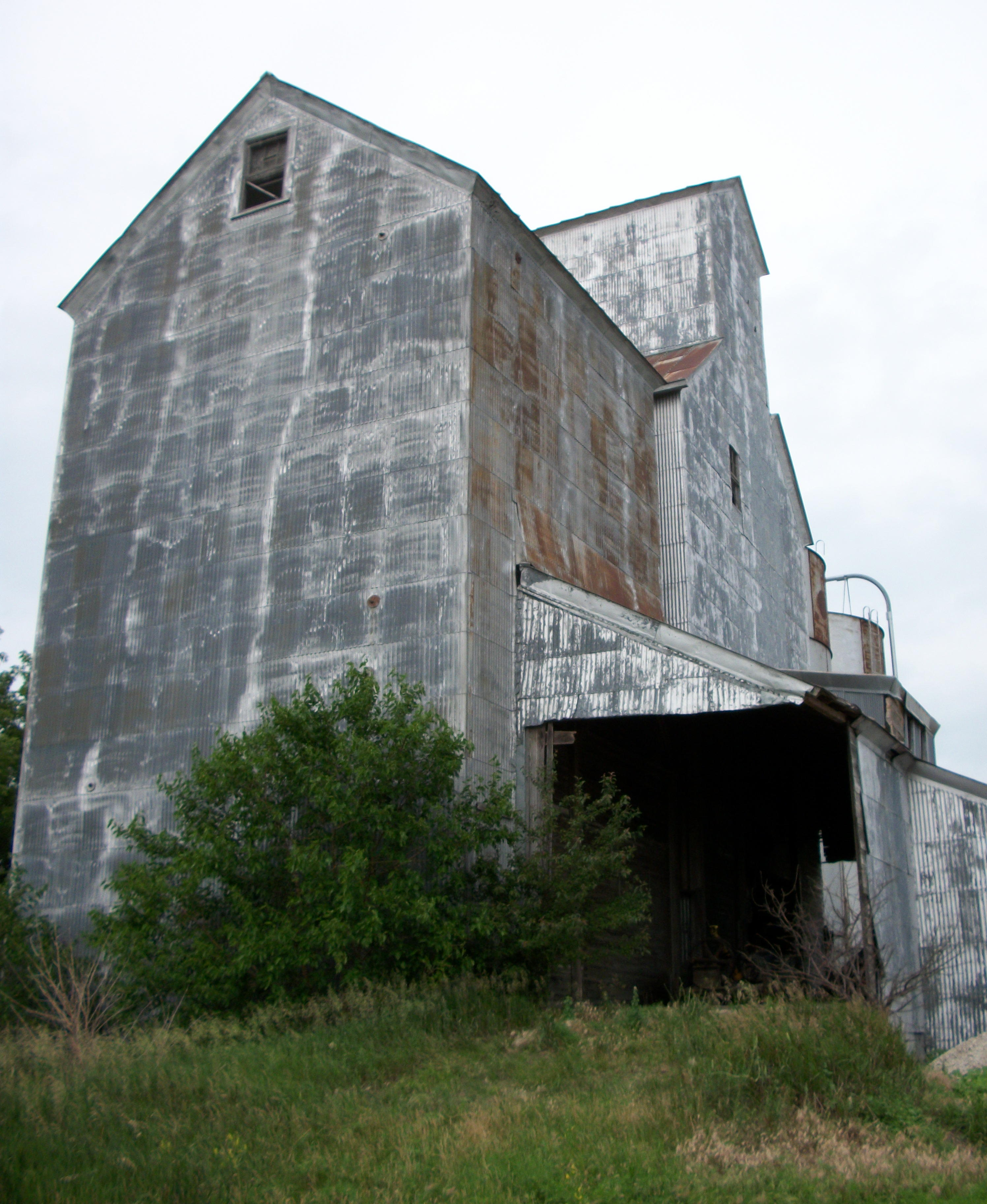
Sexton elevator

Name	County	Population (2010)	Land area	
Name	County	Population (2010)	sq mi	km^{2}
Saylorville	Polk	3,301	7.04	18.2
Park View	Scott	2,389	1.06	2.7
Lake Panorama	Guthrie	1,309	6.62	17.1
Beaverdale	Des Moines	952	2.44	6.3
Washburn	Black Hawk	876	1.24	3.2
Coalville	Webster	610	2.18	5.6
Middle Amana	Iowa	581	1.06	2.7
Amana	Iowa	442	1.13	2.9
Holiday Lake	Poweshiek	433	1.54	4.0
Denmark	Lee	423	1.66	4.3
Diamondhead Lake	Guthrie	366	0.62	1.6
Twin Lakes	Calhoun	334	1.49	3.9
Conroy	Iowa	259	0.76	2.0
Stone City	Jones	192	1.75	4.5
Mineola	Mills	166	0.41	1.1
Burr Oak	Winneshiek	166	0.69	1.8
Frytown	Johnson	165	0.81	2.1
Sun Valley Lake	Ringgold	161	2.42	6.3
South Amana	Iowa	159	1.38	3.6
Douds	Van Buren	152	2.21	5.7
Homestead	Iowa	148	1.71	4.4
West Amana	Iowa	135	0.27	0.70
Rochester	Cedar	133	0.95	2.5
Duncan	Hancock	131	0.79	2.0
Green Mountain	Marshall	126	0.69	1.8
Watkins	Benton	118	0.41	1.1
Bentley	Pottawattamie	118	1.03	2.7
High Amana	Iowa	115	0.38	0.98
Leando	Van Buren	115	1.96	5.1
Bradford	Franklin	99	0.58	1.5
Climbing Hill	Woodbury	97	1.28	3.3
Weston	Pottawattamie	92	0.41	1.1
New Haven	Mitchell	91	1.93	5.0
Garden City	Hardin	89	1.00	2.6
Chapin	Franklin	87	0.07	0.18
Percival	Fremont	87	0.44	1.1
California Junction	Harrison	85	0.46	1.2
Randalia	Fayette	68	0.22	0.57
Anderson	Fremont	65	0.33	0.85
St. Joseph	Kossuth	61	0.86	2.2
Kent	Union	61	0.49	1.3
Miller	Hancock	60	2.10	5.4
Little Cedar	Mitchell	60	1.77	4.6
River Sioux	Harrison	59	0.38	0.98
East Amana	Iowa	56	0.71	1.8
Bartlett	Fremont	50	0.40	1.0
Roseville	Floyd	49	3.69	9.6
Toeterville	Mitchell	48	0.89	2.3
Hayfield	Hancock	43	0.82	2.1
Burchinal	Cerro Gordo	40	0.08	0.21
St. Benedict	Kossuth	39	0.77	2.0
Irvington	Kossuth	38	0.94	2.4
Sexton	Kossuth	37	2.20	5.7
Portland	Cerro Gordo	35	0.21	0.54
Loveland	Pottawattamie	35	0.06	0.16
Mona	Mitchell	34	1.49	3.9
Bolan	Worth	33	2.89	7.5
Meyer	Mitchell	31	0.71	1.8
Jacksonville	Shelby	30	0.10	0.26
Hutchins	Hancock	28	0.30	0.78
Otranto	Mitchell	27	0.44	1.1
Corley	Shelby	26	0.06	0.16
Athelstan	Taylor	19	0.13	0.34

== See also ==
- List of counties in Iowa
- List of unincorporated communities in Iowa
