= David, Iowa =

- Unincorporated community
- Location within Iowa
- Coordinates: 43°24′23″N 92°39′51″W
- Country: United States
- State: Iowa
- County: Mitchell
- Elevation: 1,266 ft (386 m)
- Time zone: UTC-6 (Central (CST))
  - Summer (DST): UTC-5 (CDT)
- Area code: 641
- GNIS feature ID: 1944842(dead link)

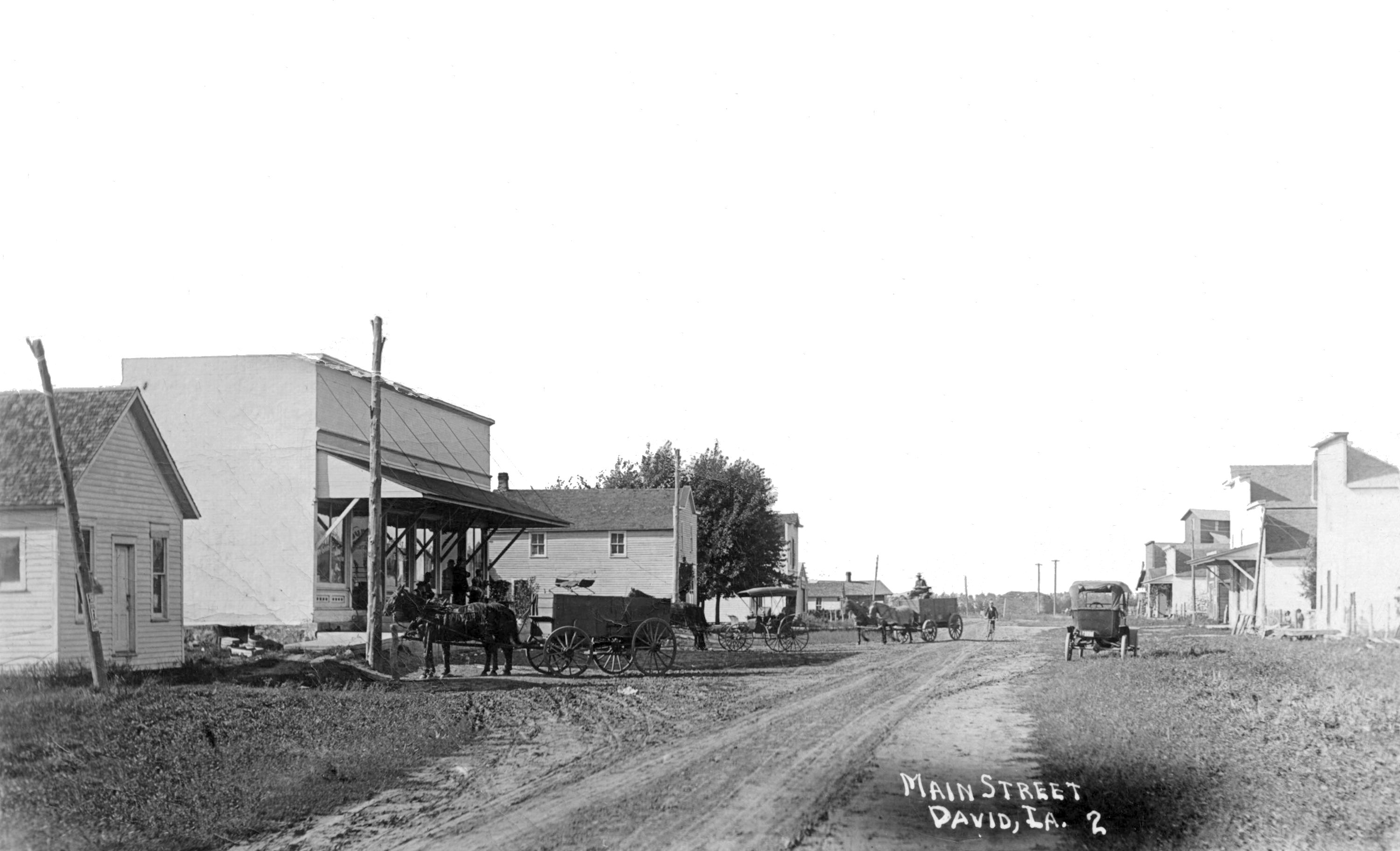
Main Street, David, Iowa

David was an unincorporated community in Mitchell County, Iowa, United States. The site lies near the junction of Shadow Avenue and 440th Street, 3.5 miles northeast of Little Cedar and four miles southwest of McIntire.

== Geography ==
David was located in the northern portion of Mitchell County along the Chicago Great Western Railway, in Jenkins Township.

== History ==
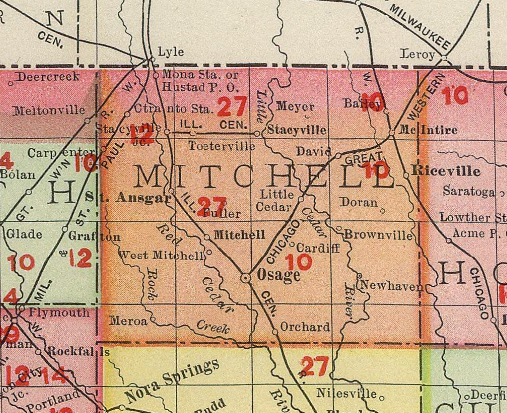
David in Mitchell County, Iowa, in 1903

David was platted by David E. McLaughlin and his wife in January 1893, in section 7 of Mitchell Township. When the CGW Railway was built through the area, McLaughlin donated a portion of his farmland for the rail line's passage, and in appreciation, rail executives named the rail station David.

The David post office was established on November 30, 1891, and was discontinued on January 14, 1933. A fraternal post of the Grand Army of the Republic, post number 512, was founded in David on April 30, 1894, with ten charter members; it moved to nearby Riceville in 1902.

The Farmers Savings Bank of David was founded in 1907; the building itself was erected in 1900. Other businesses in David (circa 1918) included a blacksmith, a creamery, a general store, a farm implement company, a lumber yard, livestock dealers, and the railroad depot.

David's population was 25 in 1902, 25 in 1915, and was 150 in 1925. The population was 20 in 1940.

Today, the David Church still operates in the area, but the site of David is mostly empty. A few farms dot the area.
