= Otranto Bridge =

- Formerly listed on the U.S. National Register of Historic Places
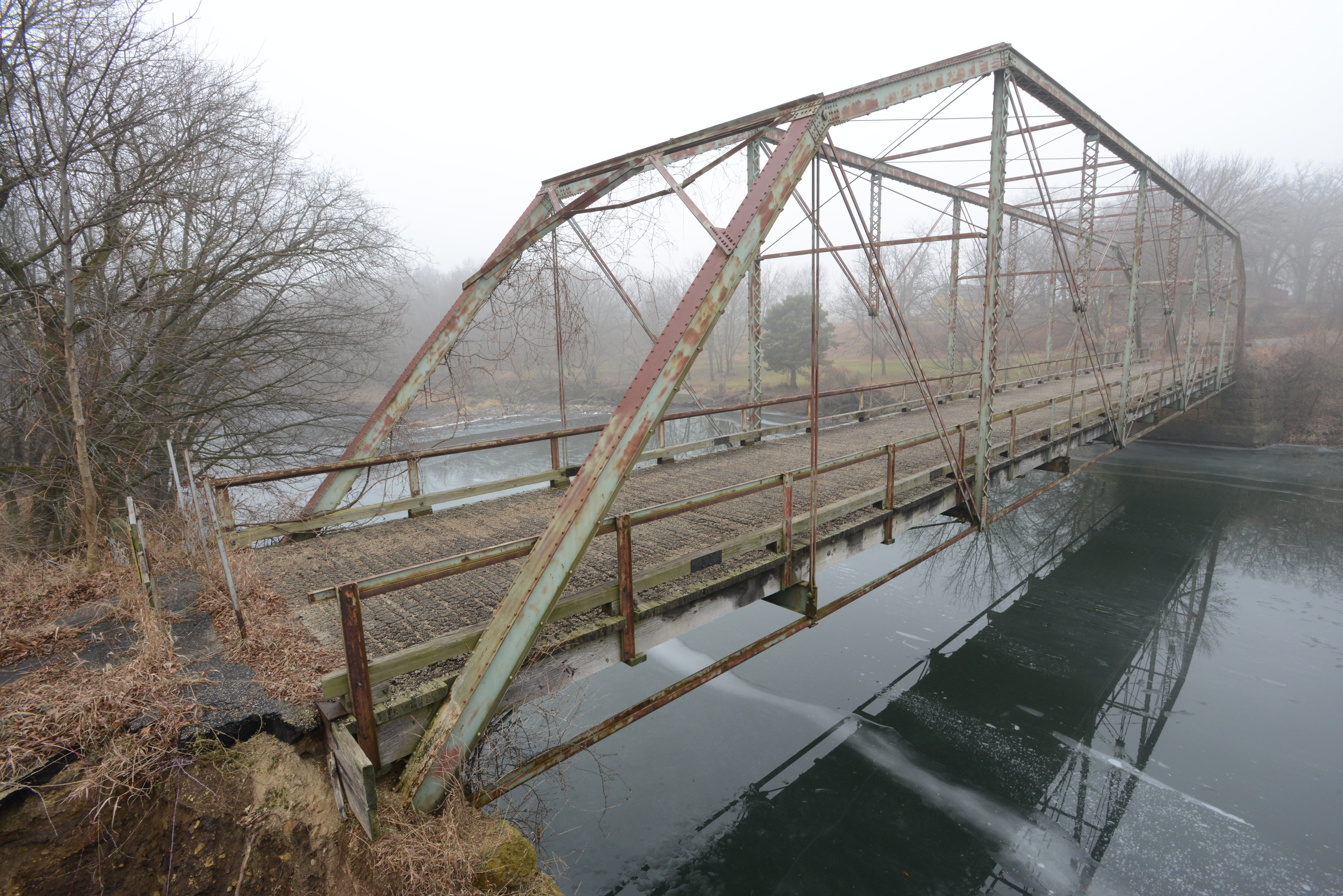

- Location within Iowa Location within the United States
- Location: 480th Ave. over the Big Cedar River
- Nearest city: St. Ansgar, Iowa
- Coordinates: 43°27′29″N 92°58′55″W
- Area: less than one acre
- Built: 1899
- Built by: Chicago Bridge and Iron Company
- Architect: Horace E. Horton
- Architectural style: Camelback truss
- MPS: Highway Bridges of Iowa MPS
- NRHP reference No.: 98000495

Significant dates
- Added to NRHP: May 15, 1998
- Removed from NRHP: October 20, 2020

The Otranto Bridge was located in the small town of Otranto, which is located northwest of St. Ansgar, Iowa, United States. It carried traffic on 480th Avenue over the Cedar River for 170 feet (52 m). The supervisors from Mitchell County contracted with the Chicago Bridge and Iron Company (CBI) to build two bridges in the county. Chicago engineer Horace E. Horton from CBI designed this Camelback through truss bridge. It replaced and older span at the same location, and it was completed in 1899 for $3,257. The Otranto Bridge was one of the few Camelback through truss bridges built in Iowa. It was replaced by a modern bridge and was privately owned before being dismantled.

The bridge was listed on the National Register of Historic Places in 1998. It was removed in 2020.
