= Meyer, Iowa =

- Census-designated place
- Location within Iowa Location within the United States
- Coordinates: 43°27′43″N 92°42′04″W
- Country: United States
- State: Iowa
- County: Mitchell
- Township: Stacyville

Area
  - Total: 0.71 sq mi (1.83 km^{2})
  - Land: 0.71 sq mi (1.83 km^{2})
  - Water: 0 sq mi (0.00 km^{2})
- Elevation: 1,266 ft (386 m)

Population (2020)
  - Total: 14
  - Density: 19.8/sq mi (7.64/km^{2})
- Time zone: Central (CST)
- ZIP code: 50455 (McIntire)
- FIPS code: 19-51510
- GNIS feature ID: 2583487

Meyer is an unincorporated community and census-designated place (CDP) in Stacyville Township, Mitchell County, in the state of Iowa, United States. As of the 2020 census the population was 14, down from 31 in 2010.

== Geography ==
Meyer is in northeastern Mitchell County, approximately 5 miles (8 km) northeast of Stacyville and 6 miles (10 km) northwest of McIntire, the post office serving Meyer. Osage, the Mitchell county seat, is 17 miles (27 km) to the southwest, and the Minnesota border is 3 miles (5 km) to the north.

According to the U.S. Census Bureau, the Meyer CDP has an area of 0.71 square miles (1.84 km^{2}), all land. The town is in the watershed of the Little Cedar River.

== Demographics ==
Historical population
Census	Pop.	Note	%±
2010	31		—
2020	14		−54.8%
U.S. Decennial Census

=== 2020 census ===
As of the census of 2020, there were 14 people, 11 households, and 9 families residing in the community. The population density was 19.8 inhabitants per square mile (7.6/km^{2}). There were 11 housing units at an average density of 15.5 per square mile (6.0/km^{2}). The racial makeup of the community was 100.0% White, 0.0% Black or African American, 0.0% Native American, 0.0% Asian, 0.0% Pacific Islander, 0.0% from other races and 0.0% from two or more races. Hispanic or Latino persons of any race comprised 0.0% of the population.

Of the 11 households, 18.2% of which had children under the age of 18 living with them, 81.8% were married couples living together, 0.0% were cohabitating couples, 0.0% had a female householder with no spouse or partner present and 18.2% had a male householder with no spouse or partner present. 18.2% of all households were non-families. 18.2% of all households were made up of individuals, 18.2% had someone living alone who was 65 years old or older.

The median age in the community was 57.0 years. 0.0% of the residents were under the age of 20; 21.4% were between the ages of 20 and 24; 21.4% were from 25 and 44; 57.1% were from 45 and 64; and 0.0% were 65 years of age or older. The gender makeup of the community was 42.9% male and 57.1% female.

== History ==
Meyer's population was 99 in 1925. The population was 75 in 1940.
