= Otranto, Iowa =

- Census-designated place
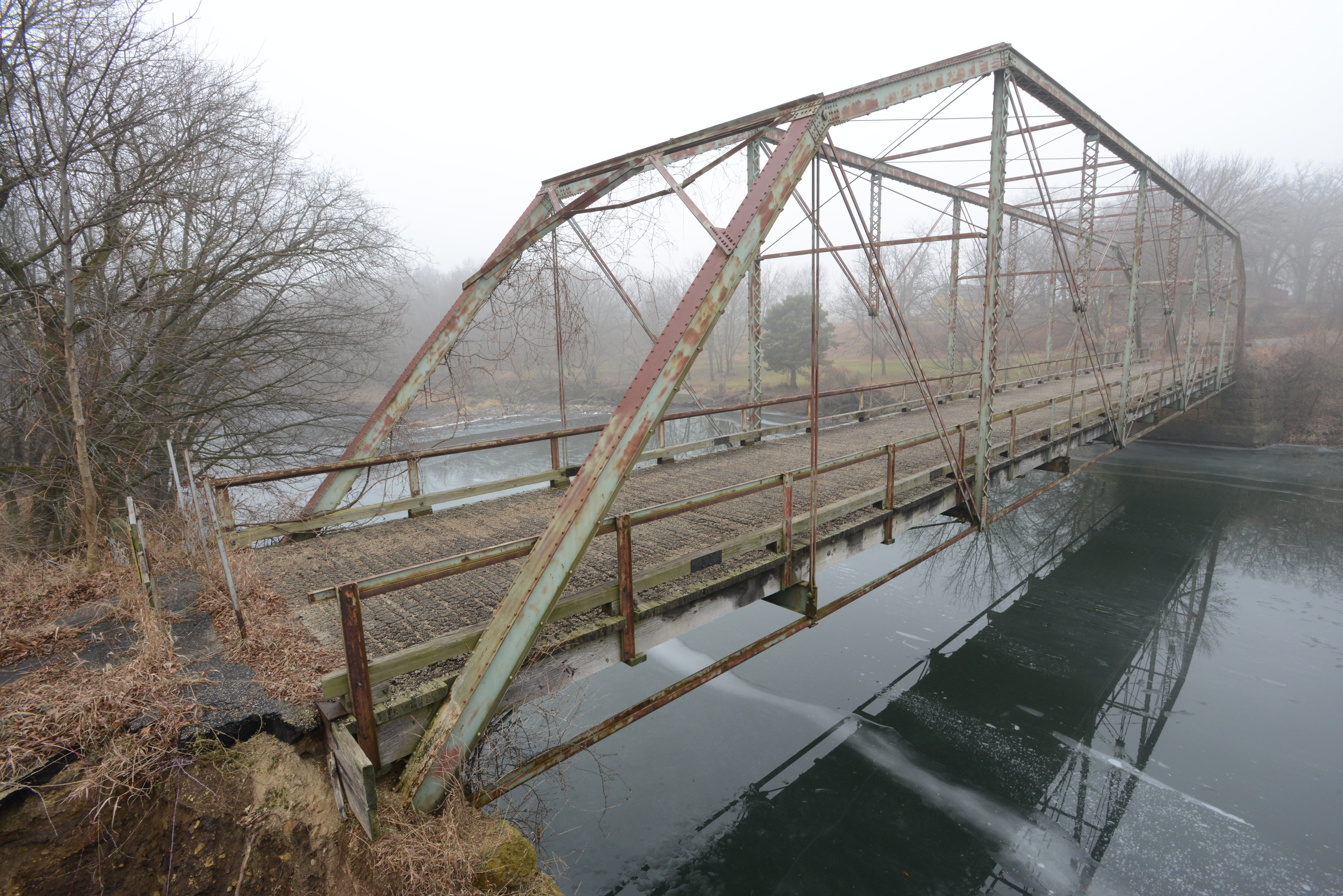
- The former Otranto Bridge over the Cedar River

- Location within Iowa Location within the United States
- Coordinates: 43°27′29″N 92°59′08″W
- Country: United States
- State: Iowa
- County: Mitchell
- Township: Otranto
- Foundation: May 1854

Area
  - Total: 0.41 sq mi (1.06 km^{2})
  - Land: 0.41 sq mi (1.06 km^{2})
  - Water: 0 sq mi (0.00 km^{2})
- Elevation: 1,168 ft (356 m)

Population (2020)
  - Total: 27
  - Density: 65.8/sq mi (25.42/km^{2})
- Time zone: Central (CST)
- ZIP code: 50472 (St. Ansgar)
- FIPS code: 19-60285
- GNIS feature ID: 2583491

Otranto is an unincorporated community and census-designated place (CDP) in Otranto Township, Mitchell County, in the U.S. state of Iowa. As of the 2020 census the population was 27, unchanged from 2010.

== History ==
In May of 1854, a certain Lewis West, and his family (including: Orlando Wilder, A.J. Wilder and his two sons, Nelson M. and Frank R), went to visit a person called Lorenzo Merry. During this travel, they decided to settle and establish their claims along the Cedar River, believing that the river would come useful in the future as a source of energy, and that it was the perfect place to build a prosperous town.

The settlement in this period started to grow in the 1850s, with the construction of the first shop in 1855 and the first post office, labelled with the name "Orville Post Office", with Davis L. West as the first postmaster.

During the 1870s, it was known as "Bartlett's Grove," after Mary Bartlett who platted it in 1877. However, by 1878, the name had once again changed, this time to the current name "Otranto", due to the proximity to a local railway which led it to dub itself as "Otranto Station".

The settlement, which aspired to become a town, was slowly losing relevance, to the point that the post office, which was inaugurated back in 1855, was closed in 1965, leaving the settlement to rely on local carrier from St. Ansgar to bring mail to the settlement. The decline can be attributed to the termination of the local highway, which ended its services in Otranto back in the 1930s, the closure of the local school, and most major infrastructure.

The population was 80 in 1940. The current population is 27 today.

== Geography ==
The community is in northwestern Mitchell County, 7 miles (11 km) northwest of St. Ansgar, the post office serving Otranto, and 18 miles (29 km) northwest of Osage, the county seat. The Minnesota border is 3 miles (5 km) to the north.

Otranto is located along the Cedar River, approximately 4 miles (6 km) southwest of Mona.

== Demographics ==
Historical population
| Census | Pop. | Note | %± |
|---|---|---|---|
| 2010 | 27 | | — |
| 2020 | 27 | | 0.0% |
U.S. Decennial Census

=== 2020 census ===
As of the census of 2020, there were 27 people, 14 households, and 13 families residing in the community. The population density was 65.9 inhabitants per square mile (25.4/km^{2}). There were 14 housing units at an average density of 34.1 per square mile (13.2/km^{2}). The racial makeup of the community was 81.5% White, 0.0% Black or African American, 3.7% Native American, 0.0% Asian, 0.0% Pacific Islander, 7.4% from other races and 7.4% from two or more races. Hispanic or Latino persons of any race comprised 11.1% of the population.

Of the 14 households, 21.4% of which had children under the age of 18 living with them, 92.9% were married couples living together, 0.0% were cohabitating couples, 0.0% had a female householder with no spouse or partner present and 7.1% had a male householder with no spouse or partner present. 7.1% of all households were non-families. 7.1% of all households were made up of individuals, 7.1% had someone living alone who was 65 years old or older.

The median age in the community was 54.8 years. 22.2% of the residents were under the age of 20; 0.0% were between the ages of 20 and 24; 7.4% were from 25 and 44; 48.1% were from 45 and 64; and 22.2% were 65 years of age or older. The gender makeup of the community was 51.9% male and 48.1% female.
