= Mitchell County Courthouse (Iowa) =

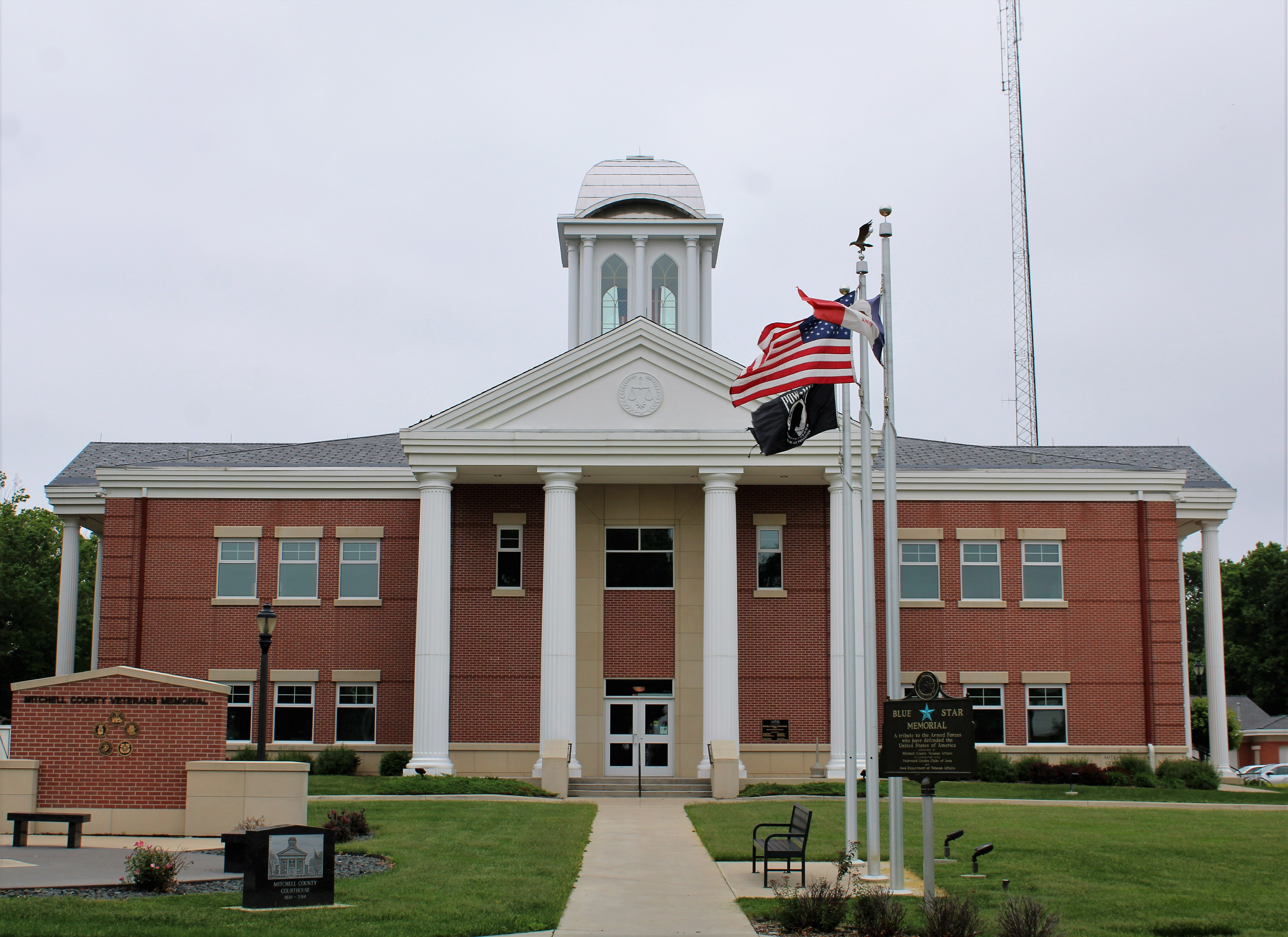
- Interactive map of the Mitchell County Courthouse area

General information
- Type: Courthouse
- Architectural style: Italianate
- Location: 212 South Fifth Street, Osage, Iowa, United States
- Coordinates: 43.282612°N 92.813768°W
- Construction started: 2014
- Completed: 2015

Technical details
- Floor count: Two

Design and construction
- Architecture firm: FEH Associates
- Mitchell County Courthouse (former)
- U.S. National Register of Historic Places
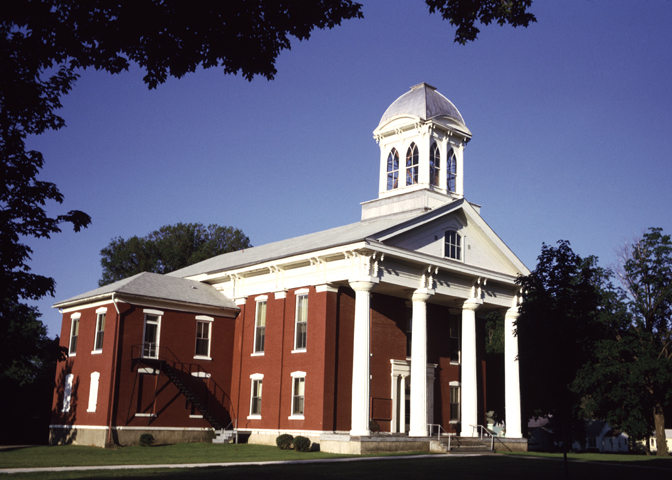
- The old courthouse in 1974

- Location within Iowa
- Interactive map showing the location for Mitchell County Courthouse
- Location: 500 State Street; Osage, Iowa
- Built: 1858
- Built by: John Bishop, John Robb, Jacob L. Chase
- Architectural style: Italianate
- MPS: County Courthouses in Iowa TR
- NRHP reference No.: 77000542
- Added to NRHP: August 29, 1977
- Main contractor: Henkel Construction

The Mitchell County Courthouse in Osage, Iowa, United States, was built in 2015. The former courthouse, built in stages between 1858 and 1926, was listed on the National Register of Historic Places in 1977 as a part of the County Courthouses in Iowa Thematic Resource. The courthouse is the second building the county has used for court functions and county administration.

== History ==
=== Original courthouse ===
There was a dispute from 1855 to 1857 as to whether Mitchell or Osage should be the county seat of Mitchell County. A commission of delegates from other counties chose Osage and construction was begun on the courthouse. Because another election was held to decide the issue construction was halted. Even though a final decision would not be made until 1870 the courthouse construction proceeded and the main block was completed in 1858. The Italianate style building cost $25,000 to complete. The exterior was faced in brick and a silver domed cupola capped the structure. Two wings were added on either side of the main block in 1879 and 1882. A third wing was added to the rear of the building in 1926. The exterior was restored from 1975 to 1976.

=== Threats and demolition ===
By 2011 the courthouse was no longer receiving funds for maintenance from the Mitchell County Board of Supervisors. An ad hoc group rallied to preserve the building before it deteriorated. County offices were moved to the Fox River Mills complex and Town & Country Plaza in late 2012. In the spring of 2013, the Mitchell County Board of Supervisors voted to replace the historic courthouse as structural issues had rendered the building unusable. The cost to rehabilitate the courthouse was nine million dollars. A proposed plan for a new courthouse including demolition of the existing structure is estimated at seven million dollars. On February 4, 2014, demolition of the courthouse began.

=== New courthouse ===
A new $8.7 million courthouse was built on the location of the former courthouse, although it faces South Fifth Street and the former courthouse faced State Street. Its architectural style mimics the former courthouse from its brick exterior, to the portico in front, to the cupola on top. It was designed by the Sioux City architectural firm FEH Associates. Henkel Construction of Mason City, Iowa was responsible for building the 30,000-square-foot (2,800 m^{2}) structure. It was opened for business on August 20, 2015. The county's Veteran's Memorial is located on the west front of the courthouse.
