= West Lincoln Township =

West Lincoln Township may refer to the following places in the United States:

- West Lincoln Township, Logan County, Illinois
- West Lincoln Township, Mitchell County, Iowa
