= Osage Community School District =

Public school district in Osage, Iowa, United States

Coordinates: 43.277590°N 92.809954°W

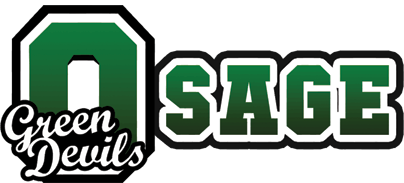

Location
- Osage, Iowa Mitchell and Floyd counties United States
- Coordinates: 43.277590, -92.809954

District information
- Type: Local school district
- Grades: K-12
- Superintendent: Barb Schwamman
- Budget: $13,918,000 (2020-21)
- NCES District ID: 1921840

Students and staff
- Students: 1000 (2022-23)
- Teachers: 68.41 FTE
- Staff: 68.74 FTE
- Student–teacher ratio: 14.62
- Athletic conference: Top of Iowa
- District mascot: Green Devils
- Colors: Green and White

Other information
- Website: www.osageschools.com

Osage Community School District is a rural public school district headquartered in Osage, Iowa.

The district occupies sections of Mitchell and Floyd counties, and in addition to Osage, it includes Mitchell and Orchard.

In 2015, Barb Schwamman became the superintendent of the Osage district. She also jointly became superintendent of the Riceville Community School District, and was nominated for the 2019-20 Iowa Superintendent of the Year award.

== Schools ==
The district operates three schools, all in Osage:

- Lincoln Elementary School
- Osage Middle School
- Osage High School

=== Osage High School ===
==== Athletics ====
The Green Devils participate in the Top of Iowa Conference in the following sports:

- Football
- Cross Country
  - Boys' 1970 Class A State Champions
- Volleyball
- Basketball
  - Boys' 2-time State Champions (1923, 1995)
  - Girls' 1992 State Champions
- Bowling
- Wrestling
  - Boys' 4-time State Champions (1940, 1965, 1981, 2023)
  - Boys’ 2023 State Dual Meet Champions
- Golf
- Track and Field
- Baseball
- Softball

== See also ==
- List of school districts in Iowa
- List of high schools in Iowa
