= East Lincoln Township =

East Lincoln Township may refer to the following places in the United States:

- East Lincoln Township, Logan County, Illinois
- East Lincoln Township, Mitchell County, Iowa
