= Orchard, Iowa =

- City
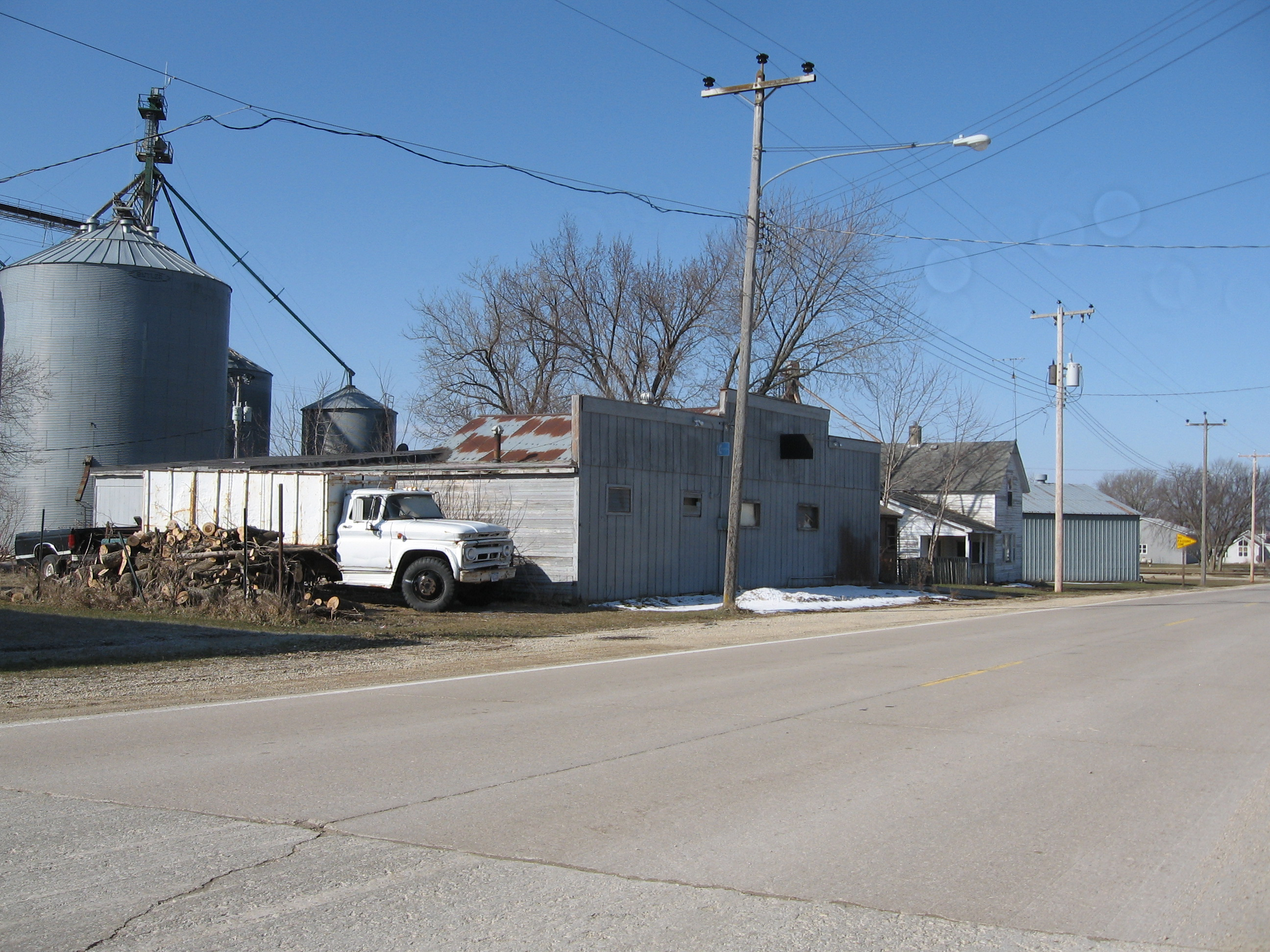
- Downtown Orchard, Iowa in 2008

- Location of Orchard, Iowa
- Coordinates: 43°13′39″N 92°46′33″W
- Country: United States
- State: Iowa
- County: Mitchell
- Incorporated: July 10, 1913

Government
  - Type: Mayor council
  - Mayor: Kyle Hobbs

Area
  - Total: 0.10 sq mi (0.26 km^{2})
  - Land: 0.10 sq mi (0.26 km^{2})
  - Water: 0 sq mi (0.00 km^{2})
- Elevation: 1,093 ft (333 m)

Population (2020)
  - Total: 68
  - Density: 670.3/sq mi (258.82/km^{2})
- Time zone: UTC-6 (Central (CST))
  - Summer (DST): UTC-5 (CDT)
- ZIP code: 50460
- Area code: 641
- FIPS code: 19-59520
- GNIS feature ID: 2396073

Orchard is a city in Mitchell County, Iowa, United States. The population was 68 at the time of the 2020 census.

== History ==
Orchard got its start in the year 1869, following construction of the Illinois Central Railroad through that territory. It was named for Moses Orchard, a pioneer settler.

=== Lithograph City ===
The ghost town of Lithograph City, approximately two miles southwest of Orchard, was founded in the early 1900s adjacent to quarries that produced lithographic limestone. Production in these quarries peaked during World War I when access to German lithographic limestone was cut off. In 1915, Lithograph City had 15 houses, a hotel, a dance hall and a museum. After the war, use of stone blocks in lithography declined, the city was renamed Devonia, and by 1938, no trace of the town remained.

== Geography ==
According to the United States Census Bureau, the city has a total area of 0.09 square miles (0.23 km^{2}), all land.

== Demographics ==
Historical populations
Year	Pop.	±%
1880	133	—
1920	124	−6.8%
1930	158	+27.4%
1940	126	−20.3%
1950	114	−9.5%
1960	116	+1.8%
1970	115	−0.9%
1980	95	−17.4%
1990	93	−2.1%
2000	88	−5.4%
2010	71	−19.3%
2020	68	−4.2%
Source:"U.S. Census website". United States Census Bureau. and Iowa Data Center; Source: U.S. Decennial Census

=== 2020 census ===
As of the census of 2020, there were 68 people, 29 households, and 19 families residing in the city. The population density was 670.3 inhabitants per square mile (258.8/km^{2}). There were 30 housing units at an average density of 295.7 per square mile (114.2/km^{2}). The racial makeup of the city was 94.1% White, 0.0% Black or African American, 0.0% Native American, 0.0% Asian, 0.0% Pacific Islander, 2.9% from other races and 2.9% from two or more races. Hispanic or Latino persons of any race comprised 1.5% of the population.

Of the 29 households, 37.9% of which had children under the age of 18 living with them, 48.3% were married couples living together, 10.3% were cohabitating couples, 27.6% had a female householder with no spouse or partner present and 13.8% had a male householder with no spouse or partner present. 34.5% of all households were non-families. 27.6% of all households were made up of individuals, 0.0% had someone living alone who was 65 years old or older.

The median age in the city was 40.5 years. 32.4% of the residents were under the age of 20; 7.4% were between the ages of 20 and 24; 16.2% were from 25 and 44; 27.9% were from 45 and 64; and 16.2% were 65 years of age or older. The gender makeup of the city was 51.5% male and 48.5% female.

=== 2010 census ===
At the 2010 census there were 71 people in 30 households, including 18 families, in the city. The population density was 788.9 inhabitants per square mile (304.6/km^{2}). There were 33 housing units at an average density of 366.7 per square mile (141.6/km^{2}). The racial makup of the city was 95.8% White, 1.4% African American, and 2.8% Native American. Of the 30 households 26.7% had children under the age of 18 living with them, 46.7% were married couples living together, 13.3% had a female householder with no husband present, and 40.0% were non-families. 23.3% of households were one person and 6.7% were one person aged 65 or older. The average household size was 2.37 and the average family size was 2.94.

The median age was 42.2 years. 21.1% of residents were under the age of 18; 9.8% were between the ages of 18 and 24; 23.9% were from 25 to 44; 29.6% were from 45 to 64; and 15.5% were 65 or older. The gender makeup of the city was 50.7% male and 49.3% female.

=== 2000 census ===
At the 2000 census there were 88 people in 33 households, including 23 families, in the city. The population density was 994.7 inhabitants per square mile (384.1/km^{2}). There were 35 housing units at an average density of 395.6 per square mile (152.7/km^{2}). The racial makup of the city was 100.00% White. Of the 33 households 30.3% had children under the age of 18 living with them, 60.6% were married couples living together, 9.1% had a female householder with no husband present, and 27.3% were non-families. 21.2% of households were one person and 9.1% were one person aged 65 or older. The average household size was 2.67 and the average family size was 2.92.

The age distribution was 29.5% under the age of 18, 6.8% from 18 to 24, 28.4% from 25 to 44, 15.9% from 45 to 64, and 19.3% 65 or older. The median age was 36 years. For every 100 females, there were 100.0 males. For every 100 females age 18 and over, there were 106.7 males.

The median household income was $19,583 and the median family income was $21,250. Males had a median income of $32,500 versus $22,083 for females. The per capita income for the city was $10,148. There were 22.2% of families and 25.3% of the population living below the poverty line, including 25.0% of under eighteens and 38.1% of those over 64.

== Education ==
Orchard is within the Osage Community School District.
