= Rock Township, Mitchell County, Iowa =

Township in Mitchell County, Iowa, U.S.

Coordinates: 43.2914°N 92.9553°W

Rock Township is a township in Mitchell County, Iowa, United States.

== History ==
Rock Township was first settled in 1853.
