= New Haven, Iowa =

- Census-designated place
- Location within Iowa Location within the United States
- Coordinates: 43°17′02″N 92°38′32″W
- Country: United States
- State: Iowa
- County: Mitchell

Area
  - Total: 1.93 sq mi (4.99 km^{2})
  - Land: 1.93 sq mi (4.99 km^{2})
  - Water: 0 sq mi (0.00 km^{2})
- Elevation: 1,116 ft (340 m)

Population (2020)
  - Total: 77
  - Density: 40.0/sq mi (15.43/km^{2})
- Time zone: UTC-6 (Central (CST))
  - Summer (DST): UTC-5 (CDT)
- ZIP Code: 50461 (Osage)
- Area code: 641
- GNIS feature ID: 2583490

New Haven is an unincorporated community and census-designated place (CDP) in Mitchell County, Iowa, United States. As of the 2020 census the population of New Haven was 77.

== History ==
New Haven was first settled circa 1883; there had been a general store at the site since 1878. New Haven's population was 19 in 1902, and 27 in 1925. The population was 150 in 1940.

== Geography ==
New Haven is in southeastern Mitchell County, 9 miles (14 km) east of Osage, the county seat and post office serving New Haven. Iowa Highway 9 runs along the western edge of the community, leading west to Osage and northeast 10 miles (16 km) to Riceville.

According to the U.S. Census Bureau, the New Haven CDP has an area of 1.93 square miles (5.00 km^{2}), all land. The Little Cedar River runs along the southwest edge of the CDP, flowing south to the Cedar River at Nashua.

== Demographics ==
Historical population
Census	Pop.	Note	%±
2010	91		—
2020	77		−15.4%
U.S. Decennial Census

=== 2020 census ===
As of the census of 2020, there were 77 people, 43 households, and 24 families residing in the community. The population density was 40.0 inhabitants per square mile (15.4/km^{2}). There were 43 housing units at an average density of 22.3 per square mile (8.6/km^{2}). The racial makeup of the community was 94.8% White, 0.0% Black or African American, 0.0% Native American, 0.0% Asian, 0.0% Pacific Islander, 5.2% from other races and 0.0% from two or more races. Hispanic or Latino persons of any race comprised 1.3% of the population.

Of the 43 households, 11.6% of which had children under the age of 18 living with them, 51.2% were married couples living together, 4.7% were cohabitating couples, 16.3% had a female householder with no spouse or partner present and 27.9% had a male householder with no spouse or partner present. 44.2% of all households were non-families. 44.2% of all households were made up of individuals, 18.6% had someone living alone who was 65 years old or older.

The median age in the community was 39.8 years. 31.2% of the residents were under the age of 20; 6.5% were between the ages of 20 and 24; 15.6% were from 25 and 44; 32.5% were from 45 and 64; and 14.3% were 65 years of age or older. The gender makeup of the community was 50.6% male and 49.4% female.
