= Newburg Township, Mitchell County, Iowa =

Township in Mitchell County, Iowa, U.S.

Coordinates: 43.3786°N 92.9753°W

Newburg Township is a township in Mitchell County, Iowa, United States.

== History ==
Newburg Township was established about 1858.
