= Douglas Township, Mitchell County, Iowa =

Township in Mitchell County, Iowa, U.S.

Coordinates: 43.2928°N 92.6067°W

Douglas Township is a township in Mitchell County, Iowa, United States.

== History ==
Douglas Township was first settled in 1855.
