= Toeterville, Iowa =

- Census-designated place
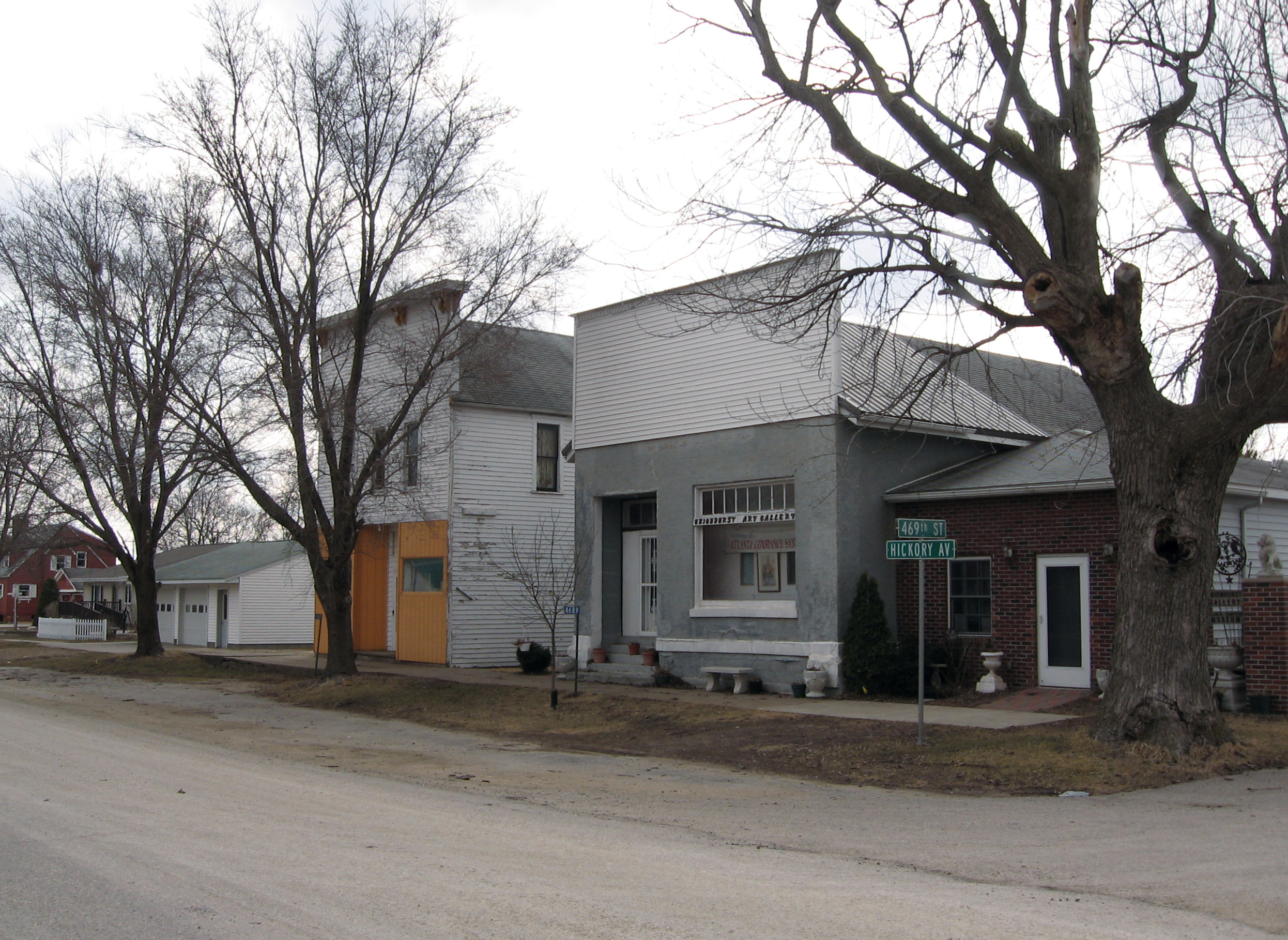
- Downtown Toeterville, Iowa

- Location within Iowa Location within the United States
- Coordinates: 43°26′24″N 92°53′19″W
- Country: United States
- State: Iowa
- County: Mitchell

Area
  - Total: 0.89 sq mi (2.30 km^{2})
  - Land: 0.89 sq mi (2.30 km^{2})
  - Water: 0 sq mi (0.00 km^{2})
- Elevation: 1,191 ft (363 m)

Population (2020)
  - Total: 53
  - Density: 59.8/sq mi (23.08/km^{2})
- Time zone: UTC-6 (Central (CST))
  - Summer (DST): UTC-5 (CDT)
- ZIP code: 50481
- Area code: 641
- FIPS code: 19-78465
- GNIS feature ID: 2583494

Toeterville (also called Toeter) is an unincorporated community and census-designated place (CDP) in northwestern Mitchell County, Iowa, United States. As of the 2020 census it had a population of 53.

== History ==
Toeterville was platted in 1898. It was named for its founders, Henry and Mina Toeter. Toeterville's population was 25 in 1902, and also 25 in 1925. The population was 56 in 1940.

Toeterville's post office was established on February 17, 1898, and discontinued on January 30, 1985, when it was attached to the St. Ansgar post office. Although its post office is gone, Toeterville retains its own ZIP Code, 50481.

== Geography ==
Toeterville lies along local roads in northwestern Mitchell County. It is 6 miles (10 km) north-northeast of St. Ansgar and 14 miles (23 km) northwest of the city of Osage, the county seat of Mitchell County. Toeterville's elevation is 1,194 feet (364 m).

== Demographics ==
Historical population
Census	Pop.	Note	%±
2010	48		—
2020	53		10.4%
U.S. Decennial Census

=== 2020 census ===
As of the census of 2020, there were 53 people, 20 households, and 13 families residing in the community. The population density was 59.8 inhabitants per square mile (23.1/km^{2}). There were 24 housing units at an average density of 27.1 per square mile (10.5/km^{2}). The racial makeup of the community was 94.3% White, 0.0% Black or African American, 0.0% Native American, 1.9% Asian, 0.0% Pacific Islander, 0.0% from other races and 3.8% from two or more races. Hispanic or Latino persons of any race comprised 1.9% of the population.

Of the 20 households, 20.0% of which had children under the age of 18 living with them, 55.0% were married couples living together, 15.0% were cohabitating couples, 0.0% had a female householder with no spouse or partner present and 30.0% had a male householder with no spouse or partner present. 35.0% of all households were non-families. 20.0% of all households were made up of individuals, 5.0% had someone living alone who was 65 years old or older.

The median age in the community was 35.6 years. 34.0% of the residents were under the age of 20; 3.8% were between the ages of 20 and 24; 32.1% were from 25 and 44; 24.5% were from 45 and 64; and 5.7% were 65 years of age or older. The gender makeup of the community was 49.1% male and 50.9% female.

=== 2010 census ===
As of the census of 2010, there were 48 people, 23 households, and 13 families residing in the town. The population density was 53.8 inhabitants per square mile (20.8/km^{2}). There were 26 housing units at an average density of 29.1 per square mile (11.2/km^{2}). The racial makeup of the town was 100.0% White.

There were 23 households, out of which 26.1% had children under the age of 18 living with them, 39.1% were married couples living together, 4.3% had a female householder with no husband present, 13.0% had a male householder with no wife present, and 43.5% were non-families. 34.8% of all households were made up of individuals, and 17.3% had someone living alone who was 65 years of age or older. The average household size was 2.09 and the average family size was 2.77.

In the city the population was spread out, with 22.9% under the age of 18, 8.4% from 18 to 24, 25.1% from 25 to 44, 27.2% from 45 to 64, and 16.7% who were 65 years of age or older. The median age was 40 years. The gender makeup of the city was 60.4% male and 39.6% female.

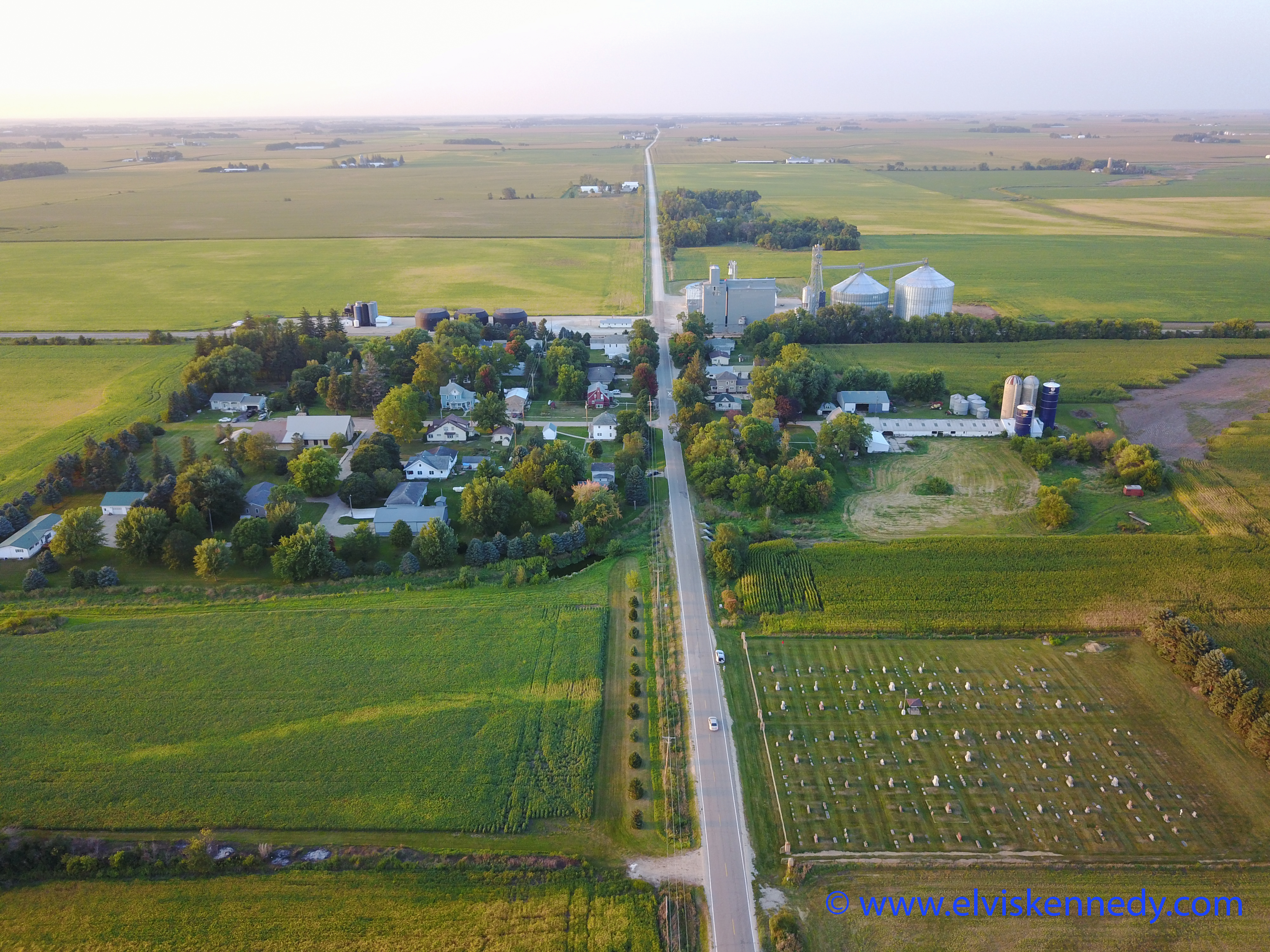
Toeterville

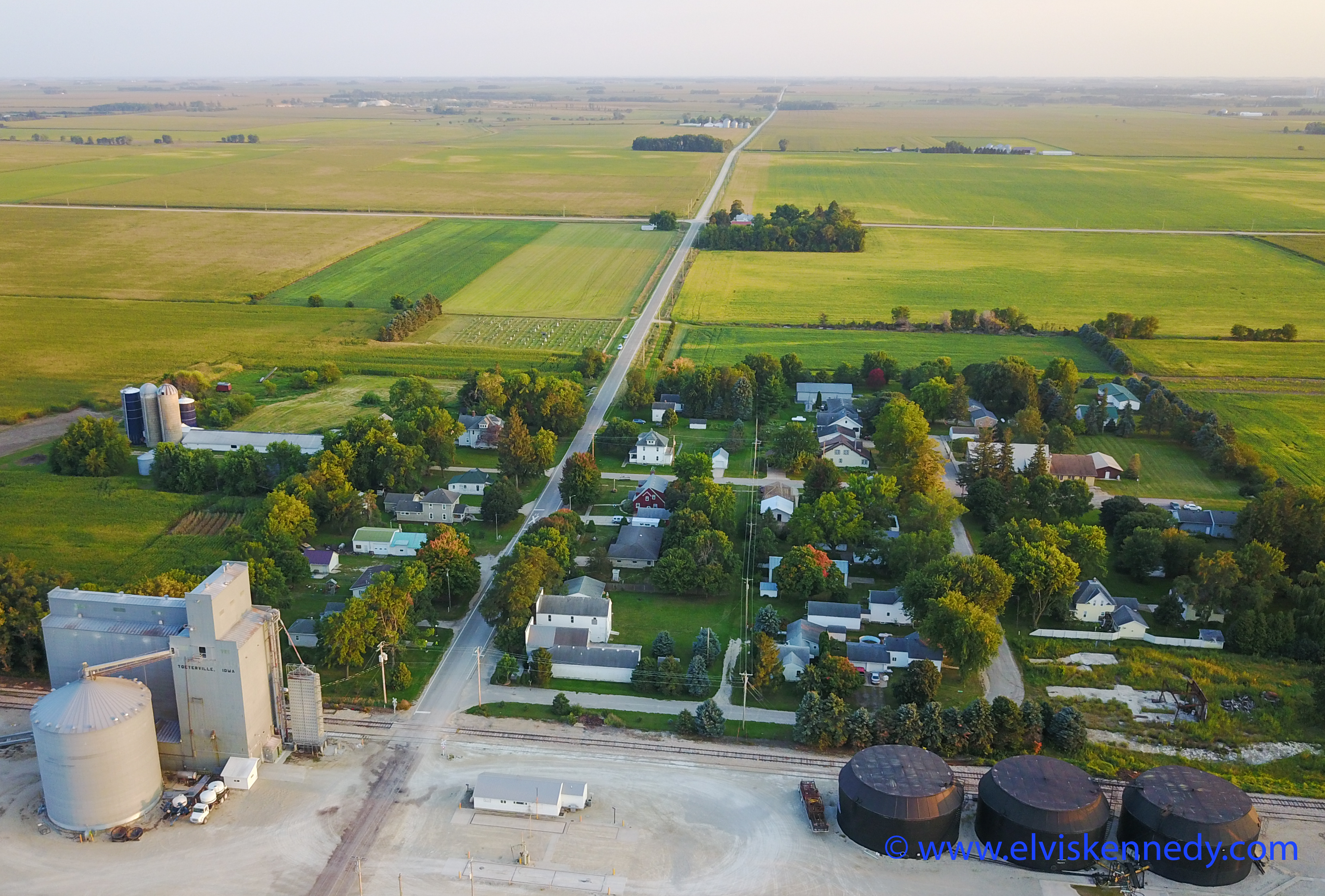
Toeterville
