= Osage Township, Mitchell County, Iowa =

Township in Mitchell County, Iowa, U.S.

Coordinates: 43.2883°N 92.8000°W

Osage Township is a township in Mitchell County, Iowa, United States.

== History ==
Osage Township was established about 1855. It was named for Orrin Sage.
