= Mitchell Township, Mitchell County, Iowa =

Township in Mitchell County, Iowa, U.S.

Coordinates: 43.3347°N 92.8403°W

Mitchell Township is a township in Mitchell County, Iowa, United States.

== History ==
Mitchell Township was established in 1855.
