= Liberty Township, Mitchell County, Iowa =

Township in Mitchell County, Iowa, U.S.

Coordinates: 43.3919°N 92.7297°W

Liberty Township is a township in Mitchell County, Iowa, United States.

== History ==
Liberty Township was established about 1869.
