= Burr Oak Township, Mitchell County, Iowa =

Township in Mitchell County, Iowa, U.S.

Coordinates: 43.3150°N 92.7250°W

Burr Oak Township is a township in Mitchell County, Iowa, United States.

== History ==
Burr Oak Township was established in 1856. It is named from a grove of burr oak trees found by early settlers.
