= St. Ansgar Township, Mitchell County, Iowa =

Township in Mitchell County, Iowa

Coordinates: 43.3886°N 92.8811°W

St. Ansgar Township is a township in Mitchell County, Iowa, United States.

== History ==
St. Ansgar Township was originally settled chiefly by Norwegians.
