= Mona, Iowa =

- Census-designated place
- Location within Iowa Location within the United States
- Coordinates: 43°29′10″N 92°57′12″W
- Country: United States
- State: Iowa
- County: Mitchell

Area
  - Total: 2.27 sq mi (5.89 km^{2})
  - Land: 2.27 sq mi (5.89 km^{2})
  - Water: 0 sq mi (0.00 km^{2})
- Elevation: 1,181 ft (360 m)

Population (2020)
  - Total: 35
  - Density: 15.4/sq mi (5.94/km^{2})
- Time zone: UTC-6 (Central (CST))
  - Summer (DST): UTC-5 (CDT)
- ZIP Code: 50472 (St. Ansgar)
- Area code: 641
- GNIS feature ID: 2583489
- FIPS code: 18-53085

Mona is an unincorporated community and census-designated place (CDP) in Mitchell County, Iowa, United States. As of the 2020 census the population of Mona was 35.

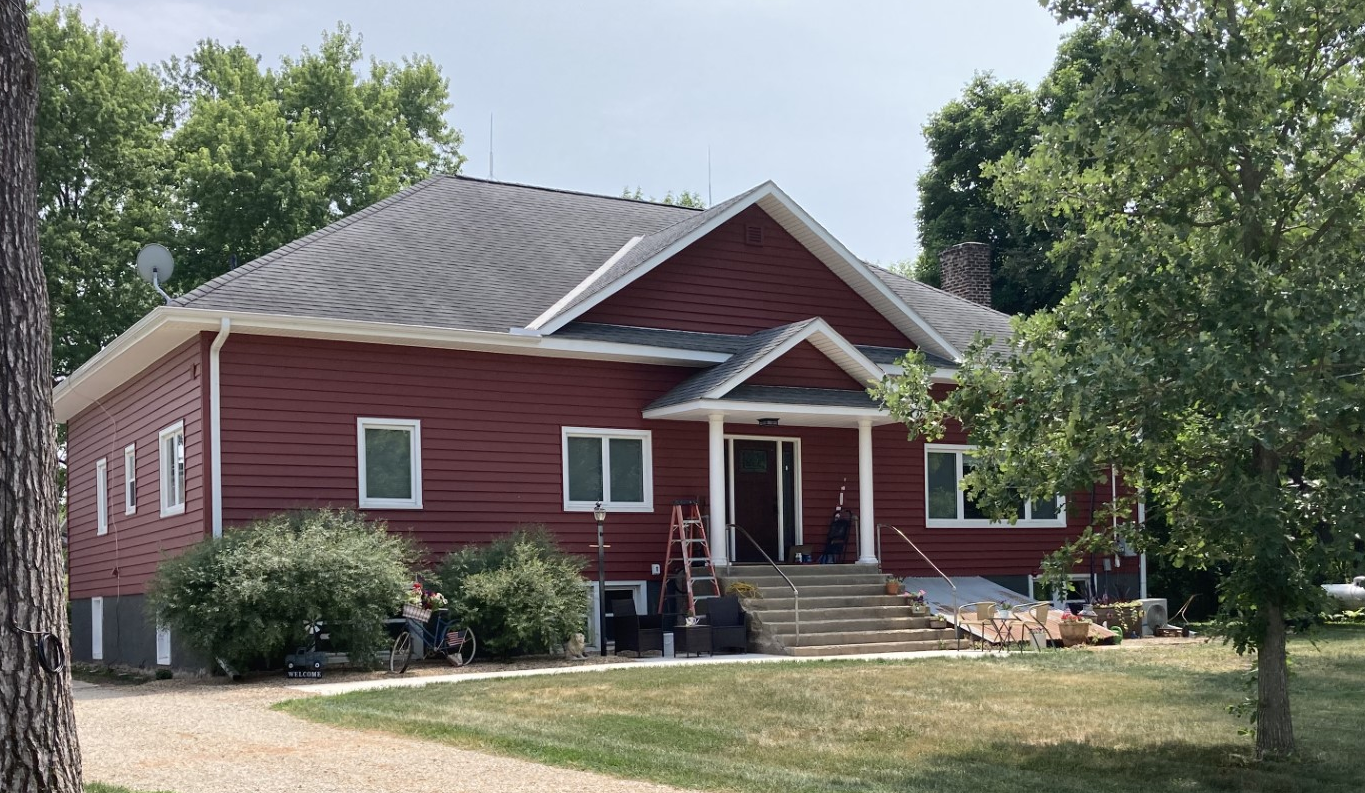
Mona school, now a residence

== History ==
Mona got its start in 1869, following construction of the Illinois Central Railroad through that territory. Mona was platted May 30, 1870, in sections 11 and 14, by Mary C. Agard, Benjamin Agard, Edward Gregory, and Charles Gregory.

Mona had one school building, with an enrollment of 56 students, with two teachers, in 1917.

Around that time, Mona had begun to decline in importance when most railroading business had been transferred to Lyle, Minnesota, across the Iowa-Minnesota border.

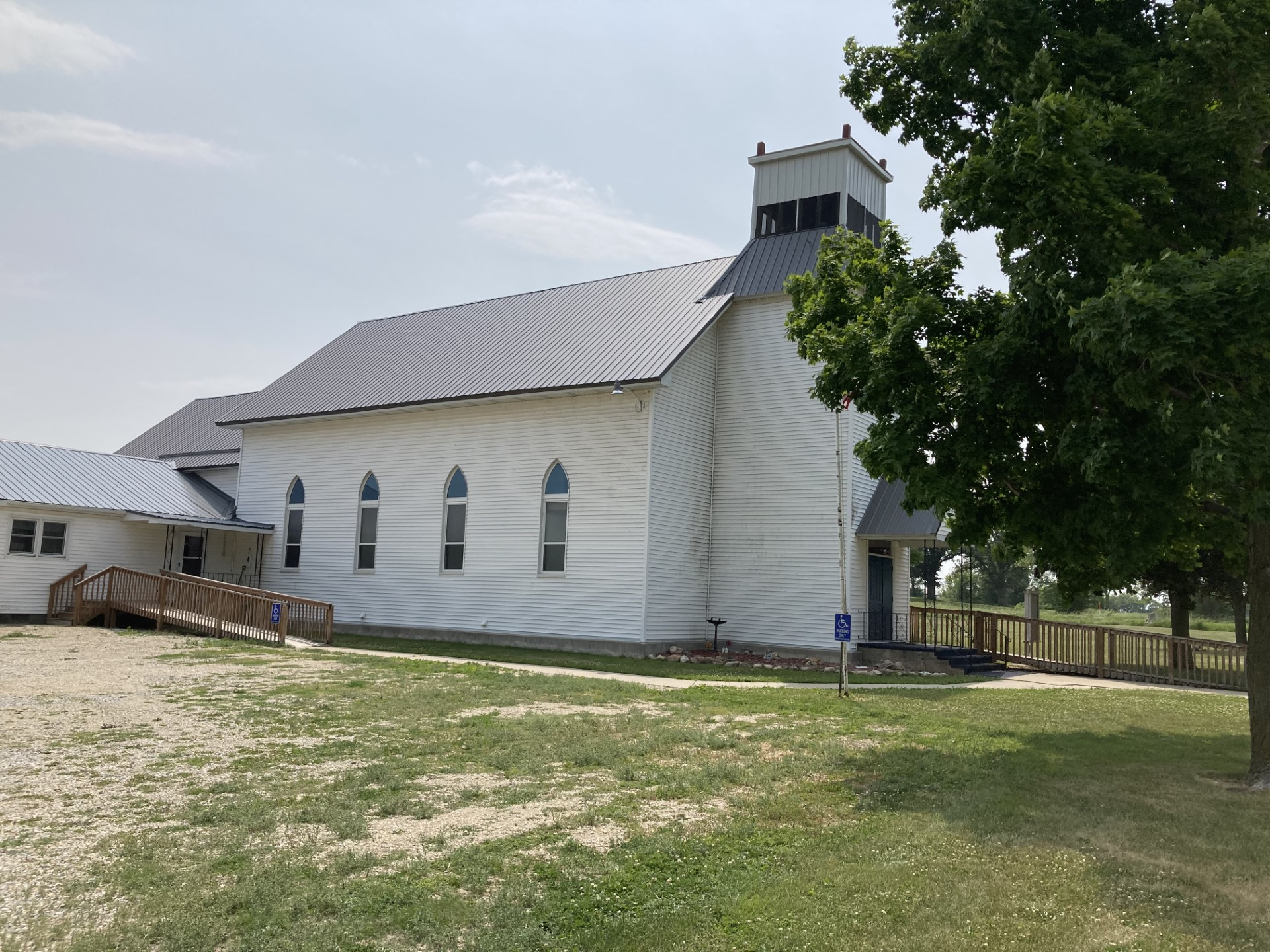
Mona Lutheran Church

The population was 50 in 1940.

== Geography ==
Mona is located in the northern portion of Mitchell County; the community's northern border is the Minnesota state line. The city of Lyle, Minnesota, abuts Mona to the north. U.S. Route 218 runs along the northeast edge of the community, leading south 8 miles (13 km) to St. Ansgar, the post office serving Mona, and 20 miles (32 km) to Osage, the Mitchell county seat. To the north US 218 leads 13 miles (21 km) to Austin, Minnesota.

According to the U.S. Census Bureau, the Mona CDP has an area of 2.28 square miles (5.91 km^{2}), all land. Otter Creek runs through the east side of the community, flowing southwest to the Cedar River at Otranto.

== Demographics ==
Historical population
| Census | Pop. | Note | %± |
|---|---|---|---|
| 2010 | 34 | | — |
| 2020 | 35 | | 2.9% |
U.S. Decennial Census

=== 2020 census ===
As of the census of 2020, there were 35 people, 13 households, and 9 families residing in the community. The population density was 15.4 inhabitants per square mile (5.9/km^{2}). There were 19 housing units at an average density of 8.4 per square mile (3.2/km^{2}). The racial makeup of the community was 91.4% White, 2.9% Black or African American, 0.0% Native American, 0.0% Asian, 2.9% Pacific Islander, 0.0% from other races and 2.9% from two or more races. Hispanic or Latino persons of any race comprised 0.0% of the population.

Of the 13 households, 15.4% of which had children under the age of 18 living with them, 61.5% were married couples living together, 0.0% were cohabitating couples, 7.7% had a female householder with no spouse or partner present and 30.8% had a male householder with no spouse or partner present. 30.8% of all households were non-families. 30.8% of all households were made up of individuals, 7.7% had someone living alone who was 65 years old or older.

The median age in the community was 58.5 years. 25.7% of the residents were under the age of 20; 0.0% were between the ages of 20 and 24; 20.0% were from 25 and 44; 17.1% were from 45 and 64; and 37.1% were 65 years of age or older. The gender makeup of the community was 54.3% male and 45.7% female.
