= Union Township, Mitchell County, Iowa =

Township in Mitchell County, Iowa

Coordinates: 43.4644°N 92.8478°W

Union Township is a township in Mitchell County, Iowa, United States.

== History ==
Union Township was established in 1868.
