= Jenkins Township, Mitchell County, Iowa =

Township in Mitchell County, Iowa, U.S.

Coordinates: 43.3708°N 92.6039°W

Jenkins Township is a township in Mitchell County, Iowa, United States.

== History ==
Jenkins Township was established in 1857. It is named for Col. James Doran Jenkins, registrar of the U.S. Land office at Osage at that time.
