= West Lincoln Township, Mitchell County, Iowa =

Township in Mitchell County, Iowa, U.S.

Coordinates: 43.2372°N 92.7478°W

West Lincoln Township is a township in Mitchell County, Iowa, United States.

== History ==
The original Lincoln Township was organized in 1858. In 1904, West Lincoln Township was established when it was separated from East Lincoln.
