= Little Cedar, Iowa =

- Census-designated place
- Location within Iowa Location within the United States
- Coordinates: 43°22′39″N 92°43′32″W
- Country: United States
- State: Iowa
- County: Mitchell

Area
  - Total: 0.53 sq mi (1.38 km^{2})
  - Land: 0.53 sq mi (1.38 km^{2})
  - Water: 0 sq mi (0.00 km^{2})
- Elevation: 1,194 ft (364 m)

Population (2020)
  - Total: 64
  - Density: 120.1/sq mi (46.39/km^{2})
- Time zone: UTC-6 (Central (CST))
  - Summer (DST): UTC-5 (CDT)
- ZIP code: 50454
- FIPS code: 19-45705
- GNIS feature ID: 2583485

Little Cedar is an unincorporated community and census-designated place (CDP) in central Mitchell County, Iowa, United States. As of the 2020 census it had a population of 64. Little Cedar has a post office with the ZIP code of 50454.

== History ==
Little Cedar was platted in 1891. It was at first known as "Wheeler", but the name was changed to avoid confusion with another existing Wheeler in the state. Little Cedar's population was 22 in 1902 and 200 in 1925. The population was 98 in 1940.

== Geography ==
The community lies along local roads 11 miles (18 km) northeast of the city of Osage, the county seat of Mitchell County. Its elevation is 1,194 feet (364 m).

According to the U.S. Census Bureau, the Little Cedar CDP has an area of 0.53 square miles (1.37 km^{2}), all land. The Little Cedar River runs along the eastern edge of the community, flowing southeast to join the Cedar River at Nashua.

== Demographics ==
Historical population
Census	Pop.	Note	%±
2010	60		—
2020	64		6.7%
U.S. Decennial Census

=== 2020 census ===
As of the census of 2020, there were 64 people, 21 households, and 16 families residing in the community. The population density was 120.2 inhabitants per square mile (46.4/km^{2}). There were 25 housing units at an average density of 46.9 per square mile (18.1/km^{2}). The racial makeup of the community was 90.6% White, 0.0% Black or African American, 0.0% Native American, 0.0% Asian, 0.0% Pacific Islander, 1.6% from other races and 7.8% from two or more races. Hispanic or Latino persons of any race comprised 4.7% of the population.

Of the 21 households, 19.0% of which had children under the age of 18 living with them, 76.2% were married couples living together, 4.8% were cohabitating couples, 0.0% had a female householder with no spouse or partner present and 19.0% had a male householder with no spouse or partner present. 23.8% of all households were non-families. 14.3% of all households were made up of individuals, 0.0% had someone living alone who was 65 years old or older.

The median age in the community was 30.0 years. 31.2% of the residents were under the age of 20; 12.5% were between the ages of 20 and 24; 25.0% were from 25 and 44; 28.1% were from 45 and 64; and 3.1% were 65 years of age or older. The gender makeup of the community was 62.5% male and 37.5% female.

=== 2010 census ===
As of the census of 2010, there were 60 people, 29 households, and 16 families residing in the town. The population density was 33.9 inhabitants per square mile (13.1/km^{2}). There were 30 housing units at an average density of 16.9 per square mile (6.5/km^{2}). The racial makeup of the town was 100.0% White.

There were 29 households, out of which 27.6% had children under the age of 18 living with them, 41.4% were married couples living together, 3.4% had a female householder with no husband present, 10.3% had a male householder with no wife present, and 44.8% were non-families. 41.4% of all households were made up of individuals, and 17.2% had someone living alone who was 65 years of age or older. The average household size was 2.07 and the average family size was 2.88.

In the city the population was spread out, with 21.7% under the age of 18, 8.3% from 18 to 24, 23.3% from 25 to 44, 30% from 45 to 64, and 16.7% who were 65 years of age or older. The median age was 40.5 years. The gender makeup of the city was 55.0% male and 45.0% female.
