= Otranto Township, Mitchell County, Iowa =

Township in Mitchell County, Iowa, U.S.

Coordinates: 43.4636°N 92.9567°W

Otranto Township is a township in Mitchell County, Iowa, United States.

== History ==
Otranto Township was established in 1857.
