= Mitchell, Iowa =

- City
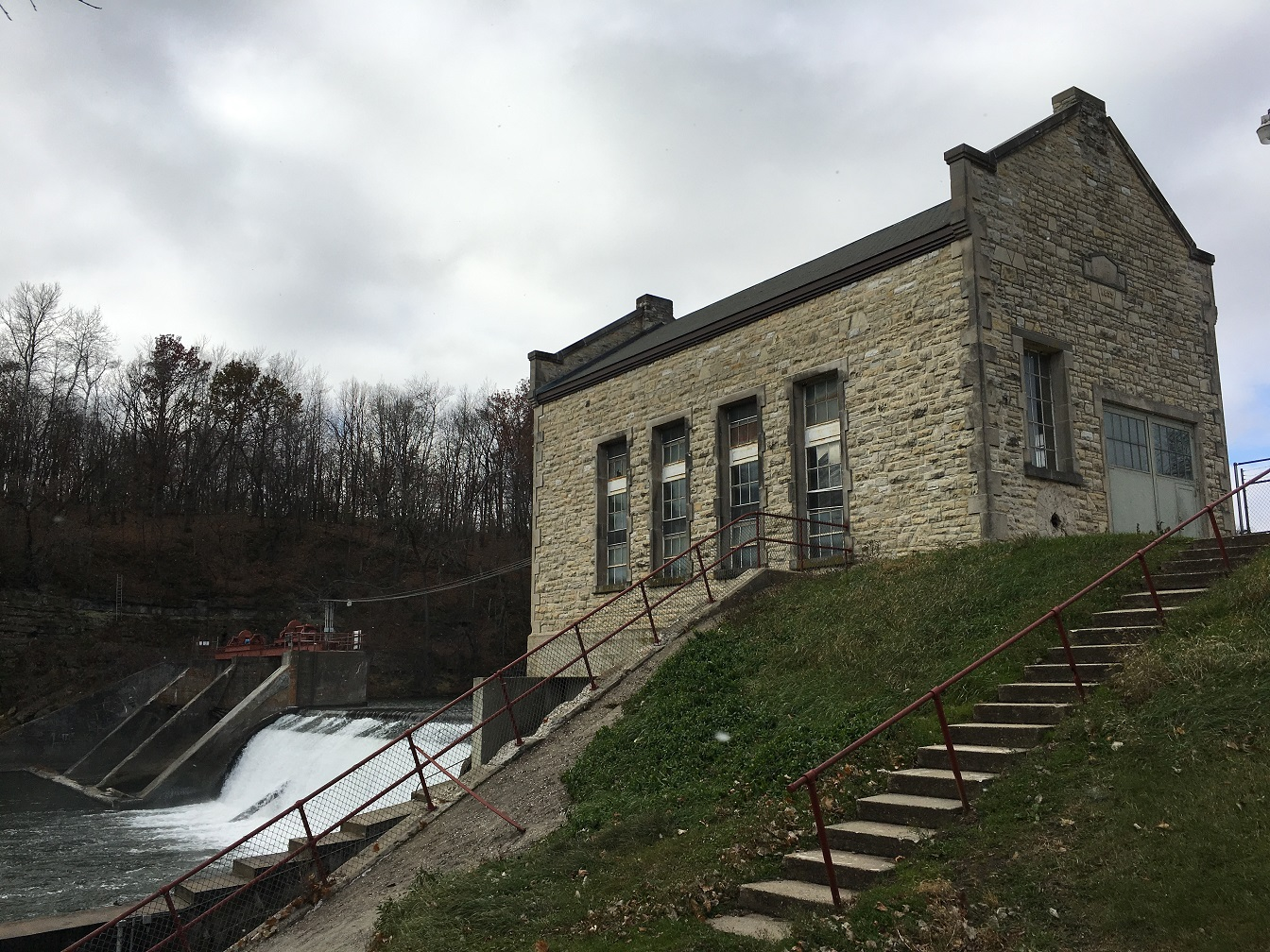
- Powerhouse and Dam on the Cedar River

- Location of Mitchell, Iowa
- Coordinates: 43°19′13″N 92°52′28″W
- Country: United States
- State: Iowa
- County: Mitchell

Area
  - Total: 0.56 sq mi (1.46 km^{2})
  - Land: 0.56 sq mi (1.46 km^{2})
  - Water: 0 sq mi (0.00 km^{2})
- Elevation: 1,191 ft (363 m)

Population (2020)
  - Total: 124
  - Density: 219.7/sq mi (84.84/km^{2})
- Time zone: UTC-6 (Central (CST))
  - Summer (DST): UTC-5 (CDT)
- ZIP code: 50461
- Area code: 641
- FIPS code: 19-52905
- GNIS feature ID: 2395358

Mitchell is a city in Mitchell County, Iowa, United States. The population was 124 at the time of the 2020 census.

== History ==
Mitchell was founded in 1854. Mitchell is the name of a friend of one of the founders, C. C. Prime.

== Geography ==
According to the United States Census Bureau, the city has a total area of 0.54 square miles (1.40 km^{2}), all land.

== Demographics ==
Historical populations
Year	Pop.	±%
1870	829	—
1880	295	−64.4%
1890	309	+4.7%
1900	245	−20.7%
1910	231	−5.7%
1920	195	−15.6%
1930	177	−9.2%
1940	161	−9.0%
1950	168	+4.3%
1960	237	+41.1%
1970	233	−1.7%
1980	193	−17.2%
1990	170	−11.9%
2000	155	−8.8%
2010	138	−11.0%
2020	124	−10.1%
Source:"U.S. Census website". United States Census Bureau. and Iowa Data Center; Source: U.S. Decennial Census

=== 2020 census ===
As of the census of 2020, there were 124 people, 61 households, and 32 families residing in the city. The population density was 219.7 inhabitants per square mile (84.8/km^{2}). There were 65 housing units at an average density of 115.2 per square mile (44.5/km^{2}). The racial makeup of the city was 97.6% White, 0.0% Black or African American, 0.0% Native American, 0.0% Asian, 0.0% Pacific Islander, 0.0% from other races and 2.4% from two or more races. Hispanic or Latino persons of any race comprised 0.8% of the population.

Of the 61 households, 24.6% of which had children under the age of 18 living with them, 39.3% were married couples living together, 9.8% were cohabitating couples, 19.7% had a female householder with no spouse or partner present and 31.1% had a male householder with no spouse or partner present. 47.5% of all households were non-families. 39.3% of all households were made up of individuals, 21.3% had someone living alone who was 65 years old or older.

The median age in the city was 47.7 years. 19.4% of the residents were under the age of 20; 3.2% were between the ages of 20 and 24; 25.0% were from 25 and 44; 28.2% were from 45 and 64; and 24.2% were 65 years of age or older. The gender makeup of the city was 48.4% male and 51.6% female.

=== 2010 census ===
As of the census of 2010, there were 138 people, 62 households, and 41 families living in the city. The population density was 255.6 inhabitants per square mile (98.7/km^{2}). There were 73 housing units at an average density of 135.2 per square mile (52.2/km^{2}). The racial makeup of the city was 100.0% White.

There were 62 households, of which 22.6% had children under the age of 18 living with them, 58.1% were married couples living together, 4.8% had a female householder with no husband present, 3.2% had a male householder with no wife present, and 33.9% were non-families. 30.6% of all households were made up of individuals, and 12.9% had someone living alone who was 65 years of age or older. The average household size was 2.23 and the average family size was 2.71.

The median age in the city was 48.3 years. 21% of residents were under the age of 18; 3.6% were between the ages of 18 and 24; 21% were from 25 to 44; 31.2% were from 45 to 64; and 23.2% were 65 years of age or older. The gender makeup of the city was 54.3% male and 45.7% female.

=== 2000 census ===
As of the census of 2000, there were 155 people, 68 households, and 42 families living in the city. The population density was 281.7 inhabitants per square mile (108.8/km^{2}). There were 73 housing units at an average density of 132.7 per square mile (51.2/km^{2}). The racial makeup of the city was 100.00% White. Hispanic or Latino of any race were 1.94% of the population.

There were 68 households, out of which 23.5% had children under the age of 18 living with them, 48.5% were married couples living together, 8.8% had a female householder with no husband present, and 38.2% were non-families. 33.8% of all households were made up of individuals, and 11.8% had someone living alone who was 65 years of age or older. The average household size was 2.28 and the average family size was 2.93.

In the city, the population was spread out, with 20.6% under the age of 18, 9.0% from 18 to 24, 25.8% from 25 to 44, 26.5% from 45 to 64, and 18.1% who were 65 years of age or older. The median age was 43 years. For every 100 females, there were 121.4 males. For every 100 females age 18 and over, there were 127.8 males.

The median income for a household in the city was $27,000, and the median income for a family was $33,750. Males had a median income of $24,375 versus $20,000 for females. The per capita income for the city was $15,768. About 7.7% of families and 12.6% of the population were below the poverty line, including 26.7% of those under the age of eighteen and 5.9% of those 65 or over.

== Education ==
It is within the Osage Community School District.

== Notable people ==
- Clinton Clauson, 66th governor of Maine from January 1959 to December 1959
- Oran Faville, first County Judge of Mitchell County, first lieutenant governor of Iowa
- Henry Haven Windsor, founder of Popular Mechanics magazine
