= East Lincoln Township, Mitchell County, Iowa =

Township in Mitchell County, Iowa, U.S.

Coordinates: 43.2350°N 92.6267°W

East Lincoln Township is a township in Mitchell County, Iowa, United States.

== History ==
The original Lincoln Township was organized in 1858. In 1904, East Lincoln Township was established when it was separated from West Lincoln.
