= Stacyville Township, Mitchell County, Iowa =

U.S. township

Coordinates: 43.4647°N 92.7336°W

Stacyville Township is a township in Mitchell County, Iowa, United States.

== History ==
Stacyville Township was established in 1856.
