= McIntire, Iowa =

- City
- Location of McIntire, Iowa
- Coordinates: 43°26′09″N 92°35′37″W
- Country: United States
- State: Iowa
- County: Mitchell

Area
  - Total: 1.01 sq mi (2.61 km^{2})
  - Land: 1.01 sq mi (2.61 km^{2})
  - Water: 0 sq mi (0.00 km^{2})
- Elevation: 1,273 ft (388 m)

Population (2020)
  - Total: 113
  - Density: 112.0/sq mi (43.25/km^{2})
- Time zone: UTC-6 (Central (CST))
  - Summer (DST): UTC-5 (CDT)
- ZIP code: 50455
- Area code: 641
- FIPS code: 19-48045
- GNIS feature ID: 2395071

McIntire is a city in Mitchell County, Iowa, United States. The population was 113 at the time of the 2020 census.

== History ==
McIntire was platted in 1891. It was named for its founders, John and Sarah McIntire. The town became electrified in 1921, and trains were a daily occurrence on the Chicago Great Western Line until this branch line was abandoned in 1967. Main Street was, until 2015, the only paved street in town.

== Geography ==
According to the United States Census Bureau, the city has a total area of 1.01 square miles (2.62 km^{2}), all land.

== Demographics ==
Historical populations
Year	Pop.	±%
1900	427	—
1910	487	+14.1%
1920	514	+5.5%
1930	268	−47.9%
1940	300	+11.9%
1950	300	+0.0%
1960	270	−10.0%
1970	234	−13.3%
1980	197	−15.8%
1990	147	−25.4%
2000	173	+17.7%
2010	122	−29.5%
2020	113	−7.4%
Source:"U.S. Census website". United States Census Bureau. and Iowa Data Center; Source: U.S. Decennial Census

=== 2020 census ===
As of the census of 2020, there were 113 people, 50 households, and 23 families residing in the city. The population density was 112.0 inhabitants per square mile (43.2/km^{2}). There were 59 housing units at an average density of 58.5 per square mile (22.6/km^{2}). The racial makeup of the city was 93.8% White, 0.0% Black or African American, 0.0% Native American, 0.9% Asian, 0.0% Pacific Islander, 0.0% from other races and 5.3% from two or more races. Hispanic or Latino persons of any race comprised 2.7% of the population.

Of the 50 households, 26.0% of which had children under the age of 18 living with them, 30.0% were married couples living together, 10.0% were cohabitating couples, 28.0% had a female householder with no spouse or partner present and 32.0% had a male householder with no spouse or partner present. 54.0% of all households were non-families. 40.0% of all households were made up of individuals, 24.0% had someone living alone who was 65 years old or older.

The median age in the city was 42.5 years. 28.3% of the residents were under the age of 20; 8.8% were between the ages of 20 and 24; 15.0% were from 25 and 44; 31.0% were from 45 and 64; and 16.8% were 65 years of age or older. The gender makeup of the city was 48.7% male and 51.3% female.

=== 2010 census ===
As of the census of 2010, there were 122 people, 55 households, and 28 families living in the city. The population density was 120.8 inhabitants per square mile (46.6/km^{2}). There were 64 housing units at an average density of 63.4 per square mile (24.5/km^{2}). The racial makeup of the city was 100.0% White. Hispanic or Latino of any race were 1.6% of the population.

There were 55 households, of which 16.4% had children under the age of 18 living with them, 41.8% were married couples living together, 5.5% had a female householder with no husband present, 3.6% had a male householder with no wife present, and 49.1% were non-families. 40.0% of all households were made up of individuals, and 32.7% had someone living alone who was 65 years of age or older. The average household size was 2.22 and the average family size was 3.14.

The median age in the city was 49.5 years. 18.9% of residents were under the age of 18; 9.8% were between the ages of 18 and 24; 14% were from 25 to 44; 22.9% were from 45 to 64; and 34.4% were 65 years of age or older. The gender makeup of the city was 47.5% male and 52.5% female.

=== 2000 census ===
As of the census of 2000, there were 173 people, 64 households, and 44 families living in the city. The population density was 170.2 inhabitants per square mile (65.7/km^{2}). There were 73 housing units at an average density of 71.8 per square mile (27.7/km^{2}). The racial makeup of the city was 100.00% White.

There were 64 households, out of which 35.9% had children under the age of 18 living with them, 54.7% were married couples living together, 7.8% had a female householder with no husband present, and 31.3% were non-families. 28.1% of all households were made up of individuals, and 20.3% had someone living alone who was 65 years of age or older. The average household size was 2.70 and the average family size was 3.36.

In the city, the population was spread out, with 34.1% under the age of 18, 4.6% from 18 to 24, 28.9% from 25 to 44, 16.8% from 45 to 64, and 15.6% who were 65 years of age or older. The median age was 35 years. For every 100 females, there were 101.2 males. For every 100 females age 18 and over, there were 107.3 males.

The median income for a household in the city was $26,875, and the median income for a family was $38,750. Males had a median income of $30,313 versus $12,188 for females. The per capita income for the city was $13,319. About 10.9% of families and 7.6% of the population were below the poverty line, including 7.0% of those under the age of eighteen and 6.3% of those 65 or over.
