= Little Cedar River (Iowa and Minnesota) =

- Mouth of the Little Cedar River

Location
- Country: United States
- State: Minnesota, Iowa
- County: Mower County, Minnesota, Iowa: Chickasaw, Floyd, Mitchell

Physical characteristics
- Source
  - location: Brownsdale, Mower County, Minnesota
  - coordinates: 43°39′16″N 92°45′22″W
- Mouth: Cedar River in Iowa
  - location: Nashua, Iowa
  - coordinates: 42°57′02″N 92°31′39″W
  - elevation: 951 ft (290 m)
- Length: 82.4-mile-long (132.6 km)
- Discharge
  - location: Ionia, Iowa
  - average: 217 cu/ft. per sec.

The Little Cedar River is an 82.4-mile-long (132.6 km) river of Iowa and Minnesota.

The Little Cedar rises in Mower County, Minnesota, and flows primarily south into Iowa, emptying into the Cedar River.

== See also ==
- List of rivers of Iowa
- List of rivers of Minnesota
