= St. Ansgar, Iowa =

- City
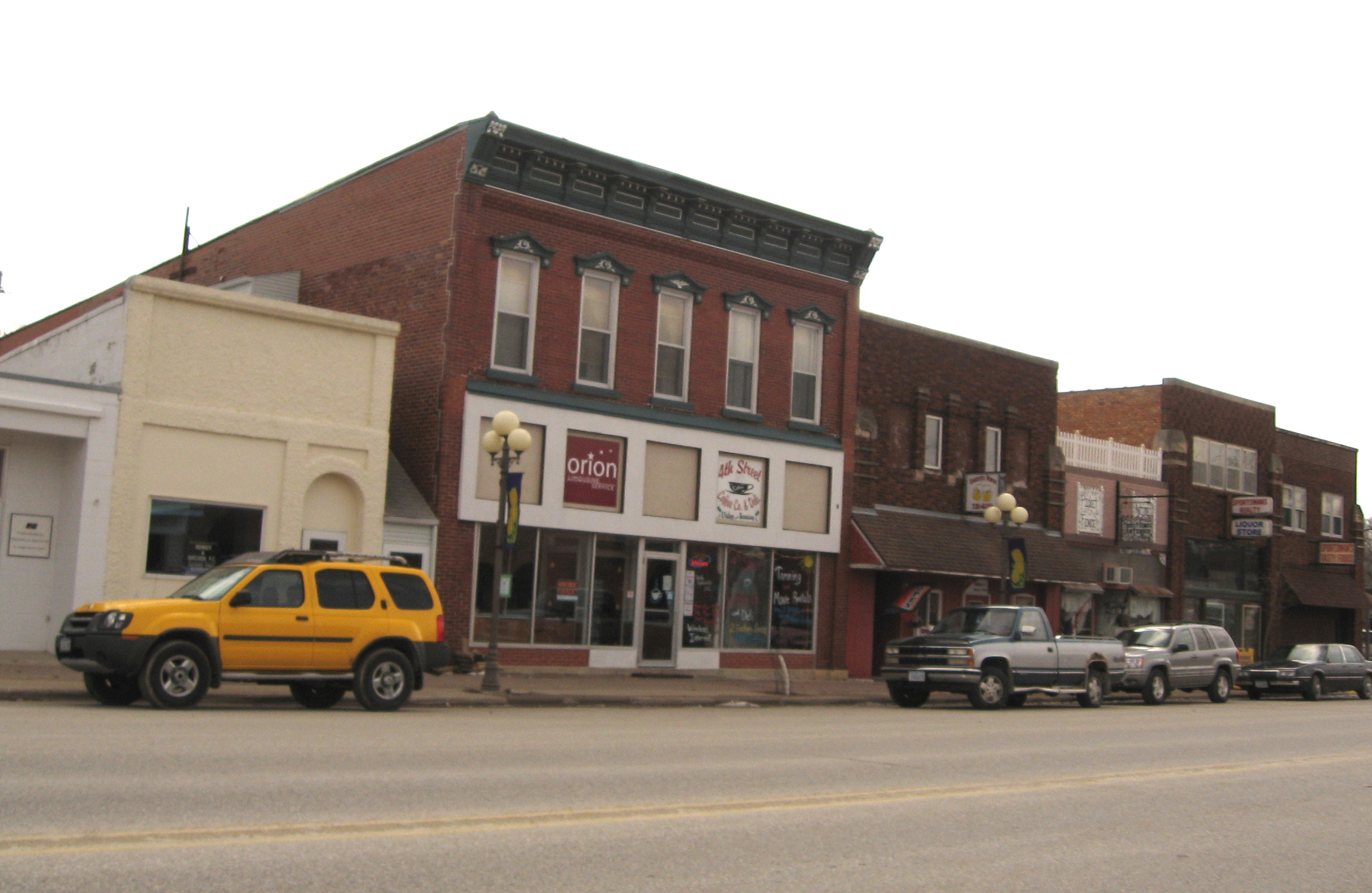
- Downtown St. Ansgar, Iowa

- Location of St. Ansgar, Iowa
- Coordinates: 43°22′48″N 92°55′04″W
- Country: United States
- State: Iowa
- County: Mitchell

Area
  - Total: 1.09 sq mi (2.82 km^{2})
  - Land: 1.09 sq mi (2.82 km^{2})
  - Water: 0 sq mi (0.00 km^{2})
- Elevation: 1,181 ft (360 m)

Population (2020)
  - Total: 1,160
  - Density: 1,066.5/sq mi (411.76/km^{2})
- Time zone: UTC-6 (Central (CST))
  - Summer (DST): UTC-5 (CDT)
- ZIP code: 50472
- Area code: 641
- FIPS code: 19-69735
- GNIS feature ID: 2396470
- Website: www.stansgar.org

St. Ansgar or Saint Ansgar is a 1.03-square-mile (2.67 km^{2}) city in Mitchell County, Iowa. It was founded in 1853 by Norwegian settlers who arrived at the convergence of the Cedar River, Deer Creek, and Turtle Creek, and was named after the patron saint of Scandinavia. It is best known for the First Lutheran Church of St. Ansgar, a pioneer Norwegian Lutheran Church, and the longest continuously occupied Lutheran church west of the Mississippi River. A stone schoolhouse built in 1858 was used for church services until the stone church could be built.

It is within the St. Ansgar Community School District school district, and As of 2020 the population was 1,160.

== First Lutheran Church ==
- First Lutheran Church
- U.S. National Register of Historic Places
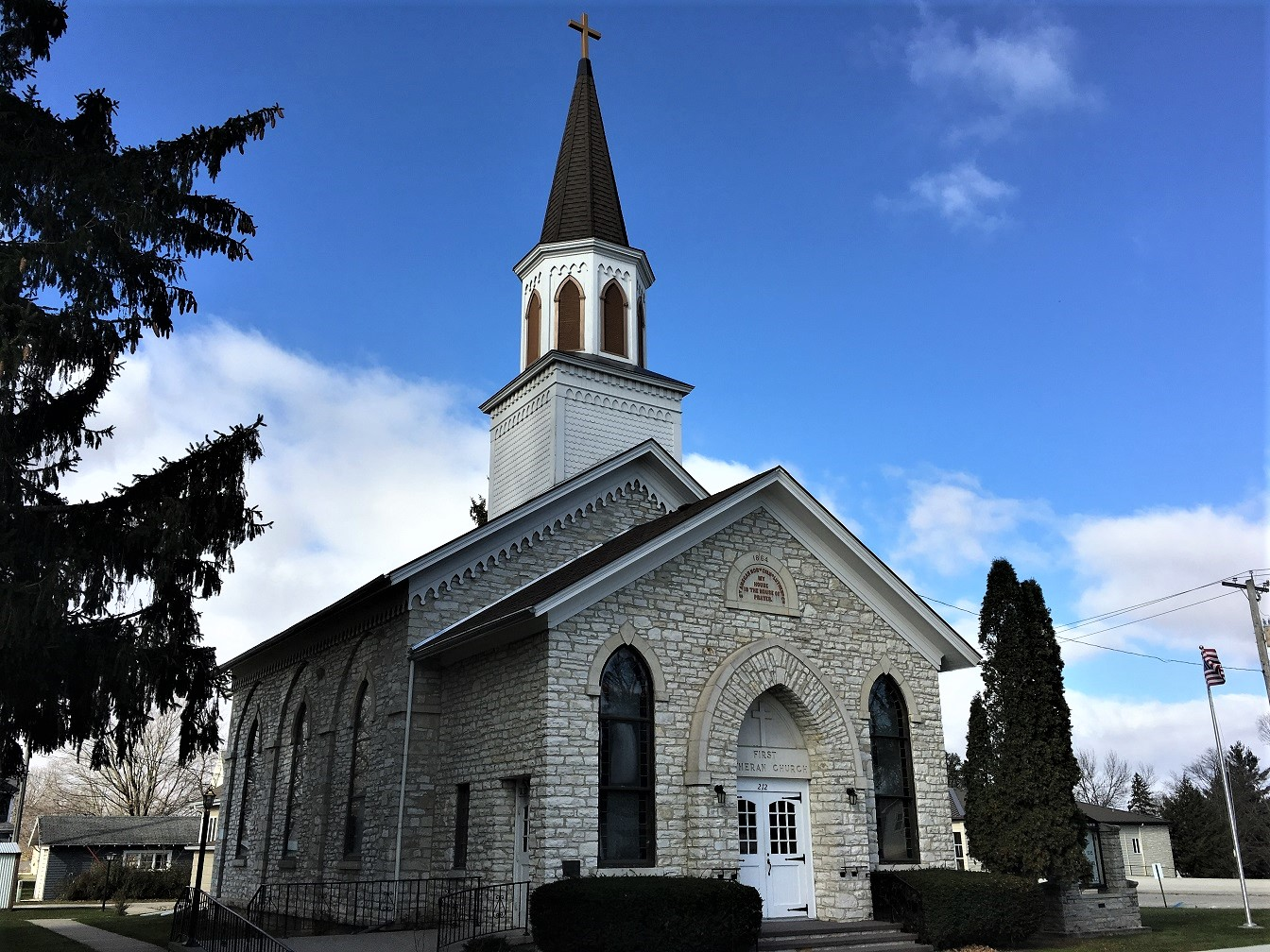
- Location: 212 N. Main St.
- Area: less than one acre
- Built: 1868
- Built by: Rauk Bros. Sveidengard Bros.
- Architectural style: Vernacular; Gothic Revival
- NRHP reference No.: 76000795
- Added to NRHP: December 12, 1975

In 1853, Claus Lauritz Clausen was commissioned by the Lutheran Church of Norway to form congregations for Norwegian immigrants in Wisconsin, Iowa, and Minnesota. Originally called the Norwegian Evangelical Lutheran Church, it was built with local resources and was dedicated on September 27, 1868. The settlers' fears were animated by the killing of settlers during the Spirit Lake Massacre in 1857 and the Dakota Uprising of 1862, and the fortified structure functioned as a barn as well as a fort. It is the sole surviving example of many similar structures built during this time.

From the mid 1850s into the late 1870s, the St. Ansgar church, congregation, and town served as a center for the dispersion of Norwegian immigrant settlers north across the border into Minnesota and into western Iowa. A stone narthex was added to the building in 1941, and in 1960, a new First Lutheran Parish Center was compled in 1960.

The building has been on the National Historical Register since 1975.

== Demographics ==
Historical populations
Year	Pop.	±%
1870	360	—
1880	552	+53.3%
1890	609	+10.3%
1900	698	+14.6%
1910	747	+7.0%
1920	844	+13.0%
1930	964	+14.2%
1940	934	−3.1%
1950	981	+5.0%
1960	1,014	+3.4%
1970	994	−2.0%
1980	1,100	+10.7%
1990	1,063	−3.4%
2000	1,031	−3.0%
2010	1,107	+7.4%
2020	1,160	+4.8%
Source:"U.S. Census website". United States Census Bureau. and Iowa Data Center; Source: U.S. Decennial Census

=== 2020 census ===
Racial composition as of the 2020 census
Race	Number	Percent
White	1,084	93.4%
Black or African American	12	1.0%
American Indian and Alaska Native	2	0.2%
Asian	7	0.6%
Native Hawaiian and Other Pacific Islander	0	0.0%
Some other race	12	1.0%
Two or more races	43	3.7%
Hispanic or Latino (of any race)	28	2.4%

As of the 2020 census, there were 1,160 people, 480 households, and 306 families residing in the city. The population density was 1,066.4 inhabitants per square mile (411.8/km^{2}). There were 520 housing units at an average density of 478.1 per square mile (184.6/km^{2}).

The median age in the city was 42.8 years. 24.1% of residents were under the age of 18, and 25.6% were 65 years of age or older. 25.7% of residents were under the age of 20; 3.7% were between the ages of 20 and 24; 22.8% were from 25 to 44; and 22.2% were from 45 to 64. For every 100 females there were 89.9 males, and for every 100 females age 18 and over there were 87.0 males age 18 and over.

Of the 480 households, 26.7% had children under the age of 18 living with them, 54.2% were married couples living together, 2.9% were cohabitating couples, 27.1% had a female householder with no spouse or partner present, and 15.8% had a male householder with no spouse or partner present. 36.2% of all households were non-families, 33.1% of all households were made up of individuals, and 19.2% had someone living alone who was 65 years old or older.

There were 520 housing units, of which 7.7% were vacant. The homeowner vacancy rate was 3.0% and the rental vacancy rate was 9.0%. 0.0% of residents lived in urban areas, while 100.0% lived in rural areas.

=== 2010 census ===
As of the census of 2010, there were 1,107 people, 468 households, and 303 families living in the city. The population density was 1,074.8 inhabitants per square mile (415.0/km^{2}). There were 506 housing units at an average density of 491.3 per square mile (189.7/km^{2}). The racial makeup of the city was 99.2% White, 0.3% Asian, and 0.5% from two or more races. Hispanic or Latino of any race were 0.8% of the population.

There were 468 households, of which 26.3% had children under the age of 18 living with them, 54.5% were married couples living together, 7.5% had a female householder with no husband present, 2.8% had a male householder with no wife present, and 35.3% were non-families. 31.4% of all households were made up of individuals, and 18.2% had someone living alone who was 65 years of age or older. The average household size was 2.26 and the average family size was 2.84.

The median age in the city was 45.2 years. 23.9% of residents were under the age of 18; 6% were between the ages of 18 and 24; 19.9% were from 25 to 44; 24% were from 45 to 64; and 26% were 65 years of age or older. The gender makeup of the city was 46.7% male and 53.3% female.

=== 2000 census ===
As of the census of 2000, there were 1,031 people, 447 households, and 282 families living in the city. The population density was 1,320.7 inhabitants per square mile (509.9/km^{2}). There were 471 housing units at an average density of 603.3 per square mile (232.9/km^{2}). The racial makeup of the city was 99.61% White, 0.19% Asian, and 0.19% from two or more races. Hispanic or Latino of any race were 0.19% of the population.

There were 447 households, out of which 21.7% had children under the age of 18 living with them, 55.0% were married couples living together, 6.0% had a female householder with no husband present, and 36.7% were non-families. 34.0% of all households were made up of individuals, and 22.1% had someone living alone who was 65 years of age or older. The average household size was 2.13 and the average family size was 2.70.

In the city, the population was spread out, with 17.9% under the age of 18, 6.0% from 18 to 24, 19.8% from 25 to 44, 24.9% from 45 to 64, and 31.3% who were 65 years of age or older. The median age was 50 years. For every 100 females, there were 77.8 males. For every 100 females age 18 and over, there were 74.4 males.

The median income for a household in the city was $33,977, and the median income for a family was $46,667. Males had a median income of $28,704 versus $20,294 for females. The per capita income for the city was $16,100. About 6.6% of families and 9.3% of the population were below the poverty line, including 15.6% of those under age 18 and 3.9% of those age 65 or over.

== Notable people ==
- Claus Lauritz Clausen, founder of Saint Ansgar, surveyed the area in 1853
- Ryan Hannam (born 1980), NFL player
