= Mitchell County, Iowa =

County in Iowa, United States

- County
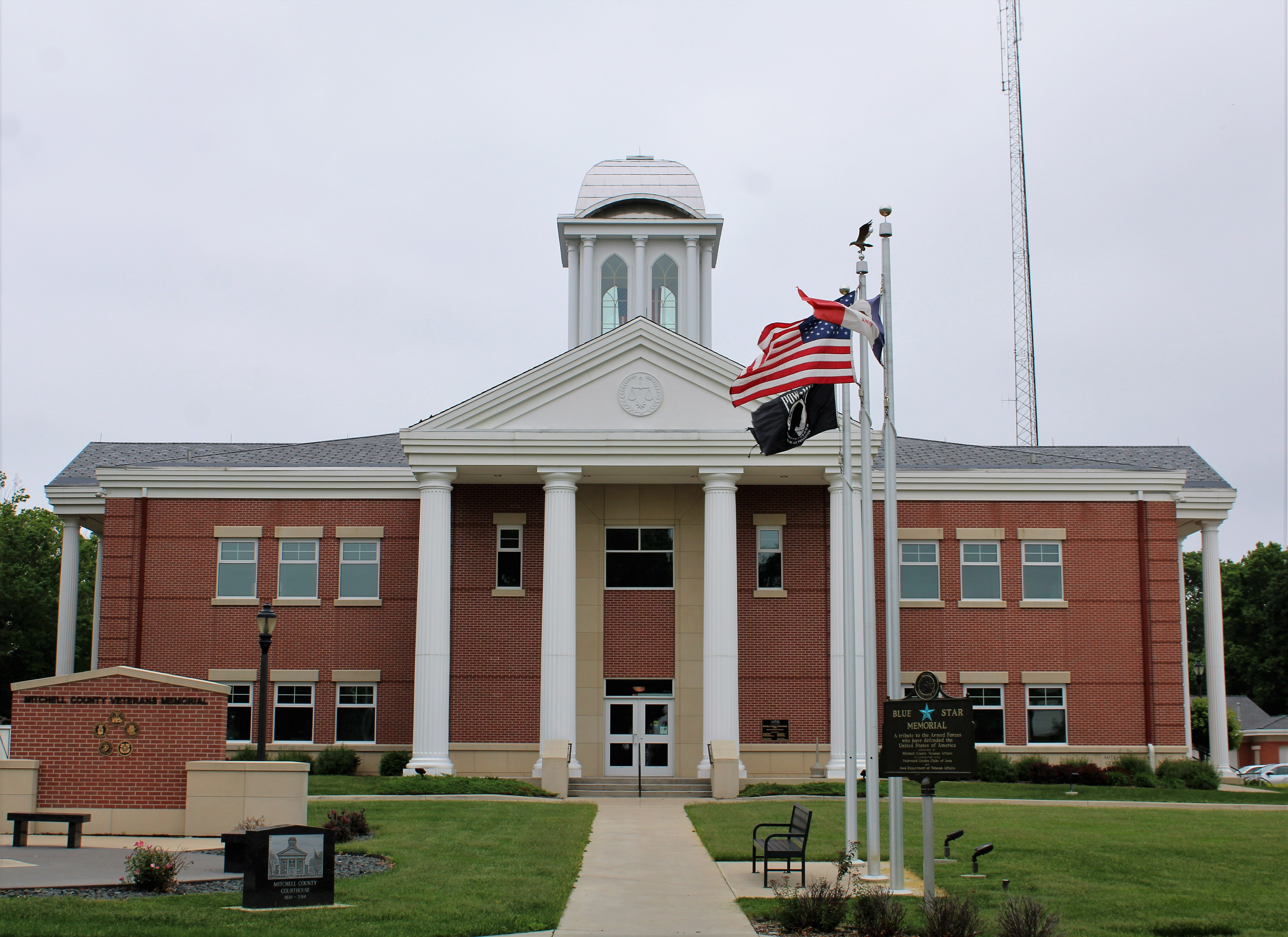
- The Mitchell County Courthouse in Osage

- Location within the U.S. state of Iowa
- Coordinates: 43°21′20″N 92°47′23″W
- Country: United States
- State: Iowa
- Founded: 1851
- Named for: John Mitchel
- Seat: Osage
- Largest city: Osage

Area
  - Total: 470 sq mi (1,200 km^{2})
  - Land: 469 sq mi (1,210 km^{2})
  - Water: 0.4 sq mi (1.0 km^{2}) 0.09%

Population (2020)
  - Total: 10,565
  - Estimate (2025): 10,650 ▲
  - Density: 22.5/sq mi (8.70/km^{2})
- Time zone: UTC−6 (Central)
  - Summer (DST): UTC−5 (CDT)
- Congressional district: 2nd
- Website: mitchellcounty.iowa.gov
- Iowa county number 66

Mitchell County is a county located in the U.S. state of Iowa. As of the 2020 census, the population was 10,565. The county seat is Osage.

== History ==
Mitchell County was founded in 1851. It is not clear whom the county is named after; the county website mentions John Mitchel, an early surveyor, and an Irish patriot. The county's courthouse was completed in 1858, and it is listed on the National Register of Historic Places. The courthouse has since been razed.

== Geography ==
According to the United States Census Bureau, the county has a total area of 470 square miles (1,200 km^{2}), of which 469 square miles (1,210 km^{2}) is land and 0.4 square miles (1.0 km^{2}) (0.09%) is water.

=== Major highways ===
- U.S. Highway 218
- Iowa Highway 9

=== Adjacent counties ===
- Mower County, Minnesota (north)
- Howard County (east)
- Floyd County (south)
- Cerro Gordo County (southwest)
- Worth County (west)

== Demographics ==
Historical population
Census	Pop.	Note	%±
1860	3,409		—
1870	9,582		181.1%
1880	14,363		49.9%
1890	13,299		−7.4%
1900	14,916		12.2%
1910	13,435		−9.9%
1920	13,921		3.6%
1930	14,065		1.0%
1940	14,121		0.4%
1950	13,945		−1.2%
1960	14,043		0.7%
1970	13,108		−6.7%
1980	12,329		−5.9%
1990	10,928		−11.4%
2000	10,874		−0.5%
2010	10,776		−0.9%
2020	10,565		−2.0%
2025 (est.)	10,650	▲	0.8%
U.S. Decennial Census; 1790–1960 1900–1990; 1990–2000 2010–2020

=== 2020 census ===
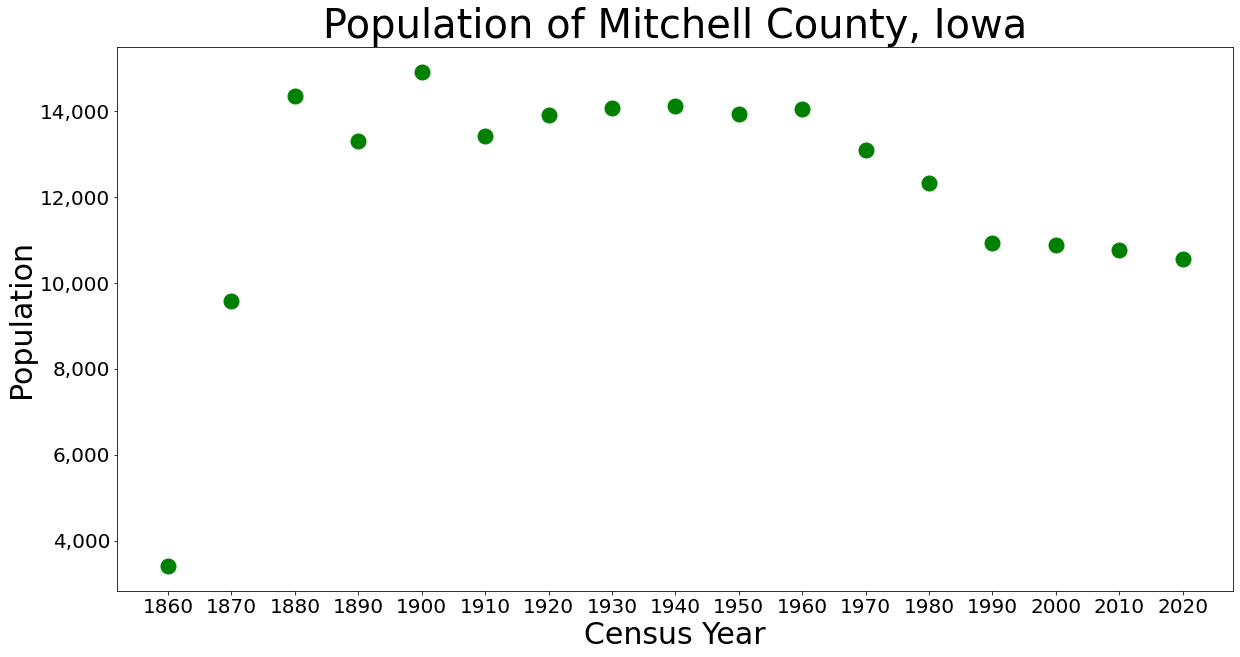
Population of Mitchell County from US census data

As of the 2020 census, the county had a population of 10,565 and a population density of 22.8/sq mi (8.8/km^{2}). There were 4,847 housing units, of which 4,382 were occupied.

The median age was 43.6 years, 23.5% of residents were under the age of 18, and 23.0% were 65 years of age or older. For every 100 females there were 99.4 males, and for every 100 females age 18 and over there were 96.6 males age 18 and over.

The racial makeup of the county per the Decennial Census Redistricting Data was 95.7% White, 0.4% Black or African American, 0.1% American Indian and Alaska Native, 0.4% Asian, <0.1% Native Hawaiian and Pacific Islander, 0.8% from some other race, and 2.5% from two or more races; Hispanic or Latino residents of any race comprised 1.8% of the population. The Decennial Census Demographic Profile shows that 97.47% of the population reported being of one race, with 93.84% non-Hispanic White, 0.40% Black or African American, 1.83% Hispanic or Latino, 0.11% American Indian and Alaska Native, 0.44% Asian, 0.04% Native Hawaiian or Pacific Islander, and 3.35% from some other race or from two or more races.

Less than 0.1% of residents lived in urban areas, while 100.0% lived in rural areas.

There were 4,382 households in the county, of which 26.6% had children under the age of 18 living in them. Of all households, 53.9% were married-couple households, 18.7% were households with a male householder and no spouse or partner present, and 22.3% were households with a female householder and no spouse or partner present. About 31.2% of all households were made up of individuals and 16.3% had someone living alone who was 65 years of age or older.

=== 2010 census ===
As of the 2010 census recorded a population of 10,776 in the county, with a population density of 23.0/sq mi (8.9/km^{2}). There were 4,850 housing units, of which 4,395 were occupied.

=== 2000 census ===
According to the U.S. Census Bureau, Mitchell County's 99% White population makes it the county with the smallest percentage of minorities nationally.

As of the 2000 census, there were 10,874 people, 4,294 households, and 2,984 families residing in the county. The population density was 23 people per square mile (8.9 people/km^{2}). There were 4,594 housing units at an average density of 10 units per square mile (3.9 units/km^{2}). The racial makeup of the county was 99.27% White, 0.17% Black or African American, 0.07% Native American, 0.17% Asian, 0.02% Pacific Islander, 0.07% from other races, and 0.21% from two or more races; 0.58% of the population were Hispanic or Latino of any race.

There were 4,294 households, out of which 30.10% had children under the age of 18 living with them, 60.80% were married couples living together, 5.70% had a female householder with no husband present, and 30.50% were non-families. 27.60% of all households were made up of individuals, and 15.40% had someone living alone who was 65 years of age or older. The average household size was 2.47 and the average family size was 3.02.

In the county, the population was spread out, with 26.50% under the age of 18, 6.10% from 18 to 24, 24.20% from 25 to 44, 21.70% from 45 to 64, and 21.60% who were 65 years of age or older. The median age was 41 years. For every 100 females there were 95.70 males; for every 100 females aged 18 and over, there were 92.00 males.

The median income for a household in the county was $34,843, and the median income for a family was $41,233. Males had a median income of $29,601 versus $22,054 for females. The per capita income for the county was $16,809. About 7.00% of families and 10.70% of the population were below the poverty line, including 16.50% of those under age 18 and 8.10% of those age 65 or over.

== Politics ==
Starting with Michael Dukakis's win in 1988, Mitchell County became a Democratic leaning county, voting for Democrats in all presidential elections through 2012. Mitchell County was the whitest county in the United States that voted for President Barack Obama, both in 2008 and 2012.

In 2016, Trump became the first Republican to win the county since Ronald Reagan in 1984, winning it by a 24% margin, the largest margin for a presidential candidate since 1968. He won it again in 2020, by an even larger 28% margin, the largest margin for any candidate since 1952. 2020 also marked the first time since 1960 that a Democrat was elected president without carrying Mitchell County.

United States presidential election results for Mitchell County, Iowa
Year	Republican		Democratic		Third party(ies)	
Year	No.	%	No.	%	No.	%
1896	2,498	69.80%	1,031	28.81%	50	1.40%
1900	2,450	70.40%	981	28.19%	49	1.41%
1904	2,158	74.93%	634	22.01%	88	3.06%
1908	1,932	65.09%	988	33.29%	48	1.62%
1912	590	20.33%	1,082	37.28%	1,230	42.38%
1916	1,963	64.38%	1,033	33.88%	53	1.74%
1920	4,476	83.95%	773	14.50%	83	1.56%
1924	2,892	46.93%	400	6.49%	2,871	46.58%
1928	3,534	59.90%	2,308	39.12%	58	0.98%
1932	2,527	38.59%	3,940	60.16%	82	1.25%
1936	2,765	41.87%	3,610	54.67%	228	3.45%
1940	3,947	56.49%	3,025	43.29%	15	0.21%
1944	3,406	55.54%	2,696	43.97%	30	0.49%
1948	3,021	49.37%	2,873	46.95%	225	3.68%
1952	5,050	69.78%	2,175	30.05%	12	0.17%
1956	4,175	61.29%	2,630	38.61%	7	0.10%
1960	3,915	57.59%	2,873	42.26%	10	0.15%
1964	2,489	39.06%	3,868	60.69%	16	0.25%
1968	3,533	60.60%	2,103	36.07%	194	3.33%
1972	3,395	57.44%	2,449	41.43%	67	1.13%
1976	2,887	49.00%	2,906	49.32%	99	1.68%
1980	3,401	58.00%	2,040	34.79%	423	7.21%
1984	3,144	54.74%	2,531	44.07%	68	1.18%
1988	2,338	44.52%	2,870	54.66%	43	0.82%
1992	1,933	36.15%	2,177	40.71%	1,237	23.13%
1996	1,877	37.01%	2,596	51.19%	598	11.79%
2000	2,388	46.26%	2,650	51.34%	124	2.40%
2004	2,646	48.28%	2,785	50.82%	49	0.89%
2008	2,469	42.82%	3,179	55.13%	118	2.05%
2012	2,643	47.31%	2,831	50.68%	112	2.01%
2016	3,190	58.89%	1,888	34.85%	339	6.26%
2020	3,677	63.16%	2,053	35.26%	92	1.58%
2024	3,736	64.74%	1,943	33.67%	92	1.59%

== Economy ==
In January 2017, Mitchell County supervisors denied an application for an Iowa Select contracted farm in Lincoln Township. It was planned for 5,000-hogs.

== Communities ==
=== Cities ===
- Carpenter
- McIntire
- Mitchell
- Orchard
- Osage
- St. Ansgar
- Stacyville

=== Census-designated places ===
- Little Cedar
- Meyer
- Mona
- New Haven
- Otranto
- Toeterville

=== Townships ===
- Burr Oak
- Cedar
- Douglas
- East Lincoln
- Jenkins
- Liberty
- Mitchell
- Newburg
- Osage
- Otranto
- Rock
- St. Ansgar
- Stacyville
- Union
- Wayne
- West Lincoln

=== Population ranking ===
The population ranking of the following table is based on the 2020 census of Mitchell County.

† county seat

Rank	City/Town/etc.	Municipal type	Population (2020 Census)
1	† Osage	City	3,627
2	St. Ansgar	City	1,160
3	Riceville (partially in Howard County)	City	806
4	Stacyville	City	458
5	Mitchell	City	124
6	McIntire	City	113
7	Carpenter	City	87
8	New Haven	CDP	77
9	Orchard	City	68
10	Little Cedar	CDP	64
11	Toeterville	CDP	53
12	Mona	CDP	35
13	Otranto	CDP	27
14	Meyer	CDP	14

== See also ==
- Mitchell County Courthouse
- National Register of Historic Places listings in Mitchell County, Iowa
