= National Register of Historic Places listings in Floyd County, Iowa =

Location of Floyd County in Iowa

This is a list of the National Register of Historic Places listings in Floyd County, Iowa.

This is intended to be a complete list of the properties and districts on the National Register of Historic Places in Floyd County, Iowa, United States. Latitude and longitude coordinates are provided for many National Register properties and districts; these locations may be seen together in a map.

There are 20 properties and districts listed on the National Register in the county.

This National Park Service list is complete through NPS recent listings posted December 12, 2025.

== Current listings ==
	Name on the Register	Image	Date listed	Location	City or town	Description
1	Brooks Round Barn		June 30, 1986 (#86001429)	West of U.S. Route 218; 42°57′00″N 92°35′04″W	Nashua	No longer exists.
2	Central Park-North Main Street Historic District	Central Park-North Main Street Historic District	August 10, 1976 (#76000771)	N. Main St. and N. Jackson St. 43°04′06″N 92°40′43″W	Charles City	
3	Charles City Junior-Senior High School		September 5, 2017 (#100001567)	500 N. Grand Ave. 43°04′05″N 92°40′20″W	Charles City	
4	Cook Farm		June 18, 1979 (#79000895)	South of Charles City on U.S. Route 218; 43°01′51″N 92°38′41″W	Charles City	
5	A.B.C. Dodd House	A.B.C. Dodd House	May 22, 1978 (#78001220)	310 3rd Ave. 43°03′55″N 92°40′06″W	Charles City	
6	Dr. Salsbury's Laboratories, Main Office and Production Laboratory Building	Dr. Salsbury's Laboratories, Main Office and Production Laboratory Building	March 7, 1996 (#96000235)	500 Gilbert St. 43°03′47″N 92°40′44″W	Charles City	
7	Floyd County Court House	Floyd County Court House	August 28, 2003 (#03000816)	101 S. Main St. 43°03′56″N 92°40′54″W	Charles City	
8	Charles Walter Hart House	Charles Walter Hart House	January 25, 1980 (#80001450)	800 3rd Ave. 43°03′55″N 92°39′38″W	Charles City	
9	Hawkeye Street Underpass	Hawkeye Street Underpass	June 25, 1998 (#98000777)	South Hawkeye St. under the railroad line 43°08′14″N 93°00′34″W	Nora Springs	
10	Lucius and Maria Clinton Lane House	Lucius and Maria Clinton Lane House	April 24, 1995 (#95000384)	2379 Timber Ave. 43°00′45″N 92°39′15″W	Charles City	
11	Main Street Bridge	Main Street Bridge	March 12, 1999 (#99000311)	Main St. over the Cedar River; 43°03′58″N 92°40′48″W	Charles City	
12	Marble Rock Bank		November 10, 1982 (#82000407)	313 Bradford St. 42°57′55″N 92°52′04″W	Marble Rock	
13	Alvin Miller House	Alvin Miller House	November 16, 1978 (#78001221)	1107 Court St. 43°04′05″N 92°41′04″W	Charles City	
14	Charles Henry Parr House	Charles Henry Parr House	January 24, 1980 (#80001451)	100 W. Hulin St. 43°04′23″N 92°40′56″W	Charles City	
15	River Street Bridge		June 25, 1998 (#98000778)	River St. over a drainage ditch 42°58′00″N 92°52′10″W	Marble Rock	
16	Rockford Mill		July 28, 1983 (#83000358)	Shell Rock River at 4th and Main St. 43°03′02″N 92°56′31″W	Rockford	
17	Sherman Nursery Company Historic District	Sherman Nursery Company Historic District	November 12, 2014 (#14000905)	1300 Grove st. 43°03′54″N 92°41′21″W	Charles City	
18	Spotts Round Barn		June 30, 1986 (#86001430)	Iowa Highway 14; 43°03′33″N 92°43′29″W	Charles City	
19	Tyden Farm No. 6 Farmstead Historic District		June 11, 2009 (#09000401)	1145 300th St. 42°55′23″N 92°59′48″W	Dougherty	
20	Wildwood Park Historic District	Wildwood Park Historic District	September 25, 1998 (#98001205)	1 Wildwood Rd. 43°03′46″N 92°41′37″W	Charles City	

== Former listings ==
One listing in Floyd county has been removed from the Register:

	Name on the Register	Image	Date listed	Date removed	Location	City or town	Description
1	Suspension Bridge		October 30, 1989 (#89001778)	January 8, 2009	Over the Big Cedar River at end of Clark St.	Charles City	Destroyed by a flood.

== See also ==
- List of National Historic Landmarks in Iowa
- National Register of Historic Places listings in Iowa
- Listings in neighboring counties: Bremer, Butler, Cerro Gordo, Chickasaw, Franklin, Howard, Mitchell
