= National Register of Historic Places listings in Mitchell County, Iowa =

Location of Mitchell County in Iowa

This is a list of the National Register of Historic Places listings in Mitchell County, Iowa.

This is intended to be a complete list of the properties and districts on the National Register of Historic Places in Mitchell County, Iowa, United States. Latitude and longitude coordinates are provided for many National Register properties and districts; these locations may be seen together in a map.

There are 11 properties and districts listed on the National Register in the county.

This National Park Service list is complete through NPS recent listings posted April 24, 2026.

	Name on the Register	Image	Date listed	Location	City or town	Description
1	Cedar Valley Seminary	Cedar Valley Seminary	November 17, 1977 (#77000541)	200 N. 7th St. 43°17′10″N 92°48′49″W	Osage	
2	Nathaniel Cobb and Lucretia Baily Deering House	Nathaniel Cobb and Lucretia Baily Deering House	January 26, 2001 (#00001678)	903 State St. 43°17′04″N 92°48′49″W	Osage	
3	First Lutheran Church	First Lutheran Church	December 12, 1976 (#76000795)	212 N. Main St. 43°22′48″N 92°55′32″W	St. Ansgar	
4	Mitchell County Courthouse	Mitchell County Courthouse	August 29, 1977 (#77000542)	500 State St. 43°16′57″N 92°48′50″W	Osage	
5	Mitchell Powerhouse and Dam	Mitchell Powerhouse and Dam	December 8, 1978 (#78001246)	Red Cedar River; 43°19′06″N 92°52′51″W	Mitchell	
6	Osage Commercial Historic District	Osage Commercial Historic District	September 12, 2002 (#02001030)	700, 600, and parts of the 500 blocks of Main St. 43°17′02″N 92°48′40″W	Osage	
7	Our Savior's Lutheran Church		July 18, 2022 (#100007944)	833 Ash St. 43°17′17″N 92°48′32″W	Osage	
8	Saint Ansgar Public School		February 6, 2020 (#100004976)	202 South Washington St. 43°22′38″N 92°55′24″W	St. Ansgar	
9	Nels Severson Barn		July 15, 1977 (#77000540)	North of Carpenter; 43°25′21″N 93°00′40″W	Carpenter	
10	Union Presbyterian Church	Union Presbyterian Church	April 13, 1977 (#77000543)	Northwest of Stacyville; 43°28′47″N 92°48′35″W	Stacyville	
11	Walnut Grove School	Walnut Grove School	September 12, 2002 (#02001028)	3272 Foothill Ave. 43°14′16″N 92°55′10″W	Osage	

== Former listing ==
	Name on the Register	Image	Date listed	Date removed	Location	City or town	Description
1	Otranto Bridge	Otranto Bridge	May 15, 1998 (#98000495)	October 20, 2020	480th Ave. over the Big Cedar River; 43°27′29″N 92°58′55″W	St. Ansgar	Dismantled

== See also ==
- List of National Historic Landmarks in Iowa
- National Register of Historic Places listings in Iowa
- Listings in neighboring counties: Cerro Gordo, Floyd, Howard, Mower (MN), Worth
