= Wildwood Park Historic District =

Wildwood Park Historic District may refer to the following places:

- Wildwood Park Historic District (Fort Wayne, Indiana), listed on the National Register of Historic Places
- Wildwood Park Historic District (Charles City, Iowa), listed on the National Register of Historic Places
