= River Street Bridge =

River Street Bridge may refer to:

- River Street Bridge (Iowa Falls, Iowa), listed on the National Register of Historic Places (NRHP)
- River Street Bridge (Marble Rock, Iowa), listed on the NRHP
- River Street Bridge (Charles River), Cambridge and Allston, Massachusetts
