= Victor Skinner =

American politician

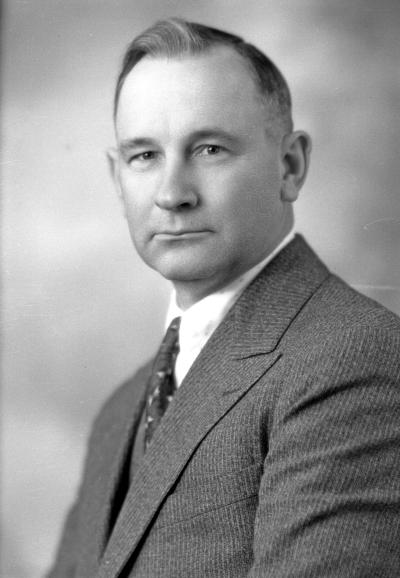
- Skinner in 1933

Member of the Washington House of Representatives for the 21st district
- In office 1933–1939

Personal details
- Born: May 12, 1882 Osage, Iowa, United States
- Died: May 21, 1960 (aged 78) Seattle, Washington, United States
- Party: Democratic

Victor Garfield Skinner (May 12, 1882 – May 21, 1960) was an American politician in the state of Washington. He served in the Washington House of Representatives from 1933 to 1939. he was also the Sergeants at Arms of the House of Representatives from 1949 to 1953.
