= Osage Commercial Historic District =

Historic district in Iowa, United States

- U.S. National Register of Historic Places
- U.S. Historic district
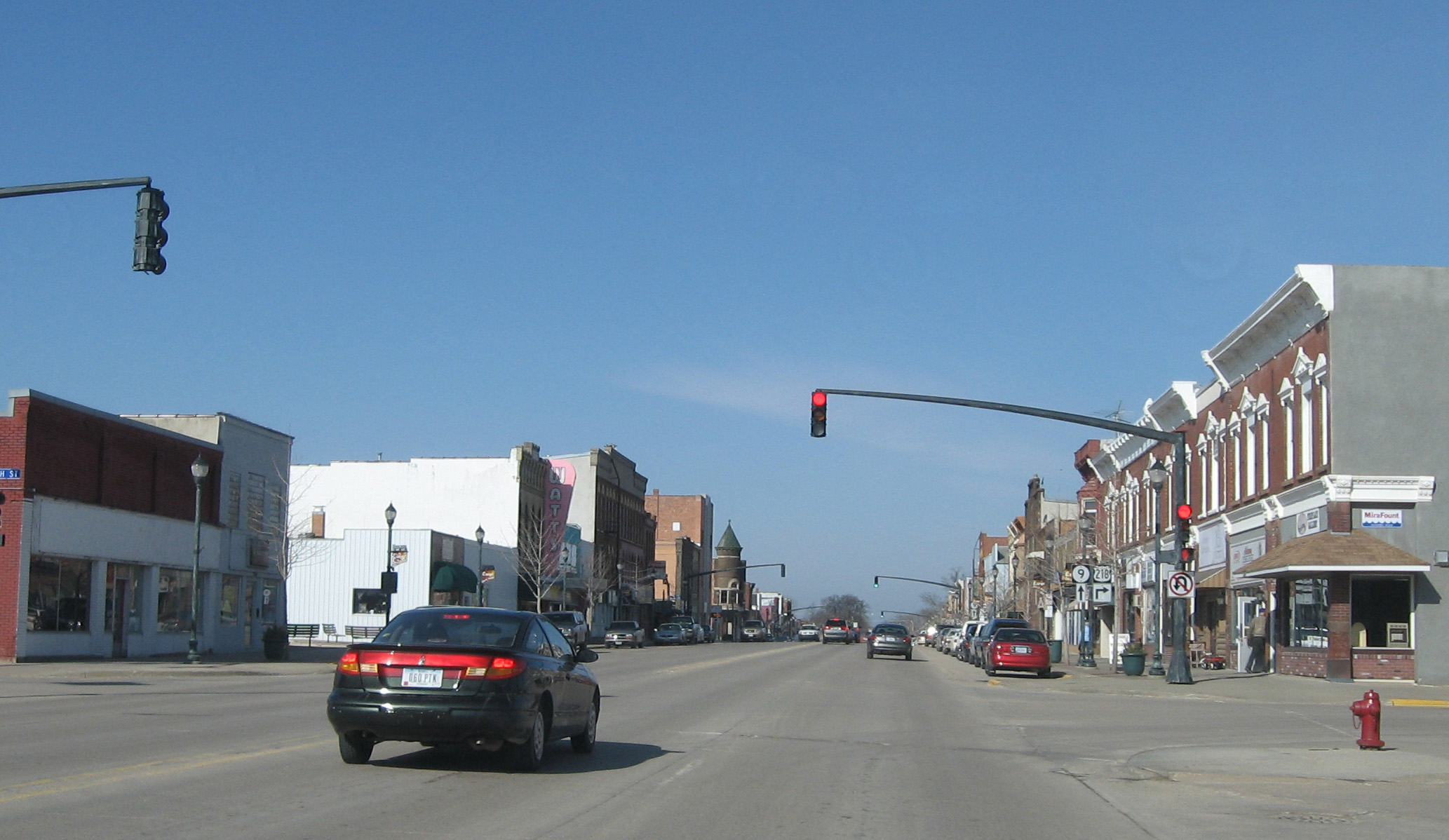

- Location within Iowa Location within the United States
- Location: 700, 600, and parts of the 500 blocks of Main St. Osage, Iowa
- Coordinates: 43°17′02″N 92°48′40″W
- Area: 8 acres (3.2 ha)
- Architectural style: Italianate; Queen Anne
- MPS: Iowa's Main Street Commercial Architecture MPS
- NRHP reference No.: 02001030
- Added to NRHP: September 12, 2002

The Osage Commercial Historic District is a nationally recognized historic district located in Osage, Iowa, United States. It was listed on the National Register of Historic Places in 2002. At the time of its nomination it contained 50 resources, which included 46 contributing buildings, one contributing structure, and three non-contributing buildings. The historic district covers most of the city's central business district.

Four settlers claimed four tracts of land that would become the city of Osage: Hiram Hart, 80 acres (32 ha) that is the southwest side; Dr. A.H. Moore, 80 acres (32 ha) for the southeast side; O.E. Tripp, the northwest side; and B.C. Whitaker on the northeast side. They were all pioneers from states to the east and not immigrants. The city was named for Orrin Sage, a banker from Massachusetts who contributed to the Gibbs, Boardman Company of Lyons, Iowa, which represented the speculative land interests of investors such as Sage. Osage initially developed to the east of the historic district. Its development to the west was the result of the location of the Illinois Central Railroad tracks and the Mitchell County Courthouse in the late 1860s.

The district contains a mix of retail commercial buildings, movie theaters, fraternal halls, professional offices, a cafe, a library, and auto-related businesses. The buildings range in size from one to three-story commercial blocks, and a majority of them are masonry construction. The period of significance is from 1865 to 1952, and the buildings are constructed during that time frame. Most of the buildings were constructed in the 1870s and the 1880s, which was a period of significant economic expansion for the city. There are also some notable buildings constructed in the 1910s and 1920s. The commercial Italianate and the Queen Anne architectural styles are dominant. The buildings line both sides of Main Street, which is the historic structure.
