= Union Presbyterian Church (Stacyville, Iowa) =

- U.S. National Register of Historic Places
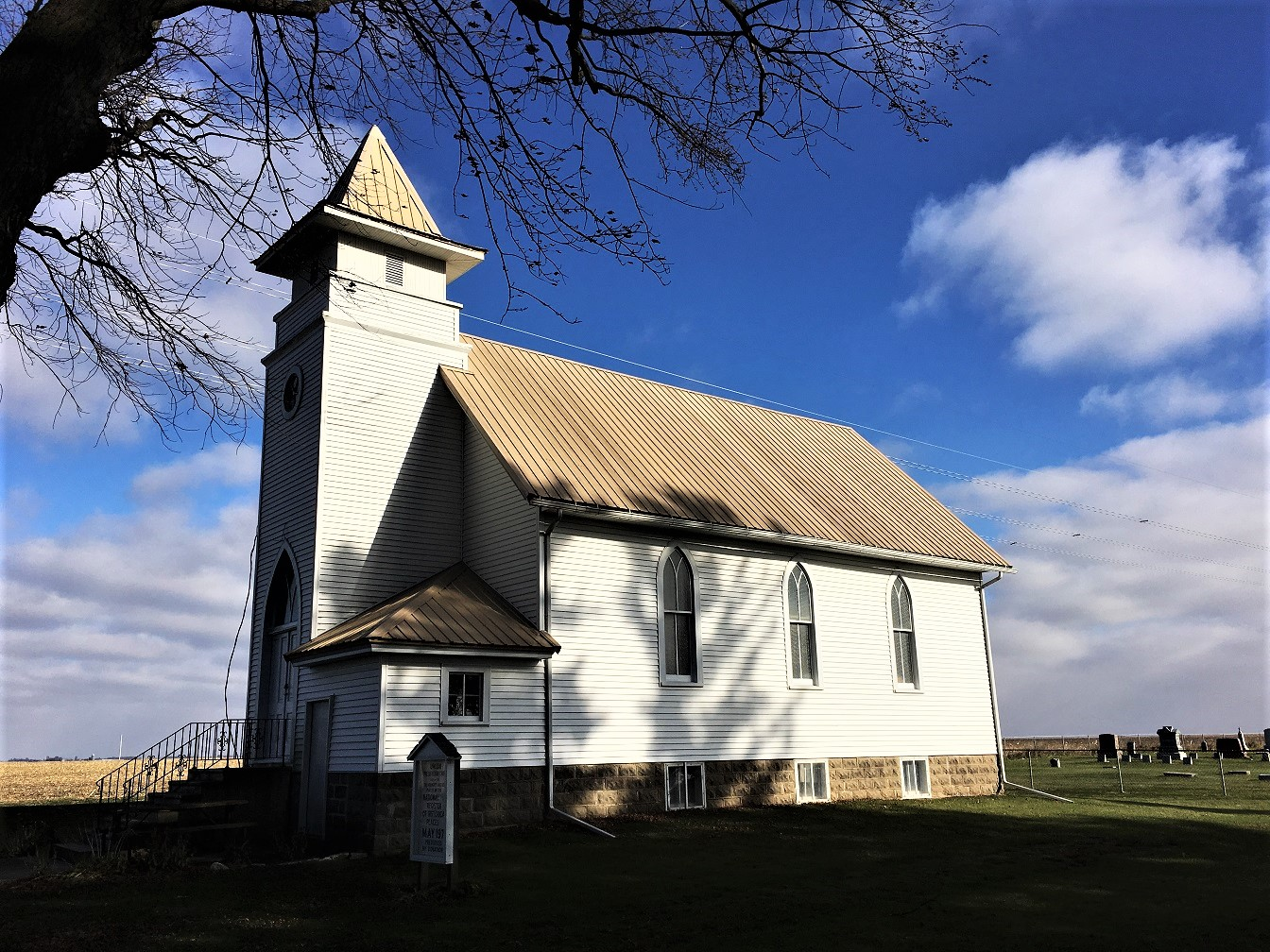

- Location within Iowa Location within the United States
- Location: Northwest of Stacyville
- Coordinates: 43°28′47″N 92°48′35″W
- Area: less than one acre
- Built: 1888
- NRHP reference No.: 77000543
- Added to NRHP: April 13, 1977

Union Presbyterian Church is a historic building located northwest of Stacyville in rural Mitchell County, Iowa, United States. Early settlers to the area of German descent established the Presbyterian congregation in the late 1850s. They initially worshiped in the homes of various church members before joining St. Peter's Lutheran Church in nearby Toeterville. Doctrinal differences resulted and the Rev. Jacob Kolb reformed the Presbyterian congregation in 1873 or 1874. Services were held in a schoolhouse until this church building was erected in 1888. It is a small frame structure with Gothic-style elements, with extensive use of pressed tin on the interior. A cemetery is located on the church grounds. Services were held in German until 1918. There was a steady decline in membership until the congregation was disbanded in 1975. The building was listed on the National Register of Historic Places in 1977.
