= Charles Henry Parr House =

Historic house in Iowa, United States

- U.S. National Register of Historic Places
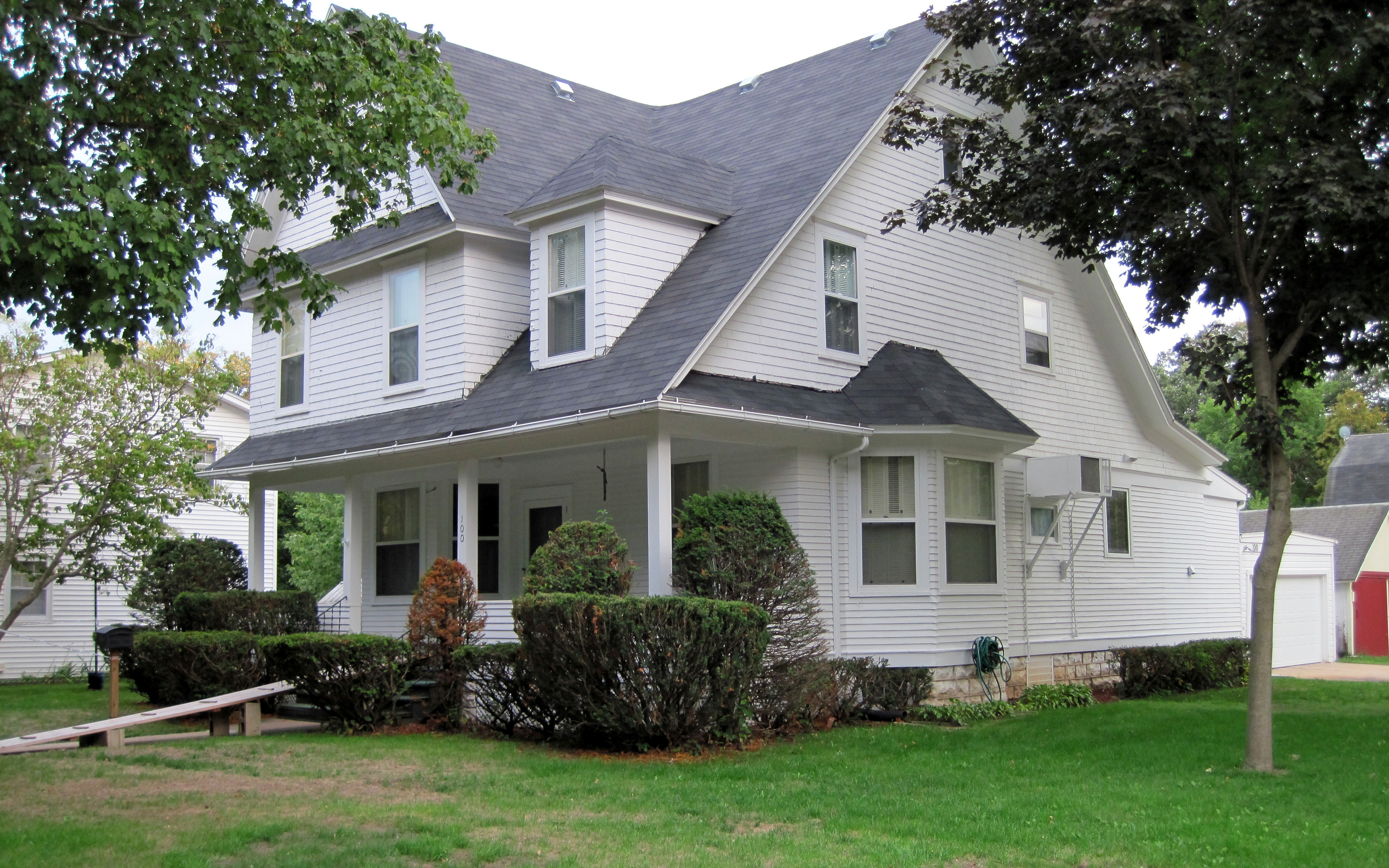

- Location within Iowa Location within the United States
- Location: 100 W. Hulin St. Charles City, Iowa
- Coordinates: 43°04′23″N 92°40′56″W
- Area: less than one acre
- Built: 1902
- NRHP reference No.: 80001451
- Added to NRHP: January 24, 1980

The Charles Henry Parr House is a historic building located in Charles City, Iowa, United States. It was listed on the National Register of Historic Places in 1980. The 2½-story, vernacular frame structure was completed in 1902.

The house's primary significance is its association with Charles Henry Parr, who lived here from 1902, when he had it built, to 1941 when he died. He, along with Charles Walter Hart, founded the Hart-Parr Co. in Charles City. It was the first business in the country to exclusively manufacture farm tractors, and is attributed with coining the term "tractor." Parr was more of the inventor while Hart was more of a manager. During World War I the plant produced shells for the United States Army. After the war they sold their interests in the business and Hart moved to Montana, and Parr went to Wisconsin to work with Conrad Frudden for a few years. After returning to Charles City, Parr continued his association with Hart-Parr as an engineer. In 1929 the company was one of four companies that merged to form Oliver Farm Equipment Company.
