= Margaret Stoughton Abell =

American forester

- Born: Margaret Stoughton; June 25, 1908; Osage, Iowa, US
- Died: February 22, 2004 (aged 95); Corvallis, Oregon, US
- Occupation: Forester

Margaret Stoughton Abell (June 25, 1908 – February 22, 2004) was an American forester.

== Early life ==
On June 25, 1908, Abell was born as Margaret Stoughton in Osage, Iowa. Abell's father was Herbert Leonard Stoughton. Abell's mother was Elizabeth (née Higgins) Stoughton.

== Education ==
In 1929, as a student and Junior Forester, Abell wrote a paper titled "A Glimpse of the Appalachian Forest Experiment Station". In 1930, Abell graduated with a bachelor's degree in forestry from Iowa State College in Ames, Iowa.

== Career ==
In June 1930, Abell joined the Appalachian Forest Experimental Station in Asheville, North Carolina. Abell was also a skilled photographer. Abell became the first woman research forester in the Forest Service. In 1937, Abell left Forest Service.

== Personal life ==
Abell married Charles A. Abell, a forester. They have three children, Jean E. Abell Porter, Susan Marie Abell, and Barbara Abell Borgers. On February 22, 2004, Abell died in Corvallis, Oregon. She was 95.

=== Legacy ===
As a woman in the male dominated field of forestry, Abell's life is celebrated during International Woman's Day. In addition, Abell's life is also celebrated during Women's History month.

== Published works ==
This is a selected list of published papers by Abell.

- A Glimpse of the Appalachian Forest Experiment Station (1929)(1933 abstract).
- Basal Fire Wounds on Some Southern Appalachian Hardwood (1933 abstract). Co-author.

== See also ==
- Bent Creek Campus of the Appalachian Forest Experiment Station
- United States Forest Service
