= Marble Rock Bank =

- U.S. National Register of Historic Places
- Location within Iowa Location within the United States
- Location: 313 Bradford St. Marble Rock, Iowa
- Coordinates: 42°57′55″N 92°52′04″W
- Built: 1885
- NRHP reference No.: 82000407
- Added to NRHP: November 10, 1982

Marble Rock Bank, also known as the Marble Rock Historical Society Building, is a historic building located in Marble Rock, Iowa, United States. New York native J.B. Shepardson settled in Marble Rock in 1864. He was involved in a number of ventures including running a store, a hotel, and land speculation. He and his brother S.E. Shepardson opened the Marble Rock Bank in 1873, and they had this building constructed in 1885. It is a single-story structure that features a stone facade, nine corbels that support a plain cornice, and a simple stone plaque that identified the building as a bank. The building survived two fires that destroyed much of the town in 1899, making this the oldest commercial building in town. Banking operations moved from here in 1927, and the bank itself closed in 1932. The Marble Rock Historical Society, established in 1972, bought the building in 1974 for use as a museum. They have subsequently acquired other buildings that have been added to the museum complex. The former bank building was listed on the National Register of Historic Places in 1982.
