= Walnut Grove School (Osage, Iowa) =

Historic one-room schoolhouse in Iowa

- U.S. National Register of Historic Places
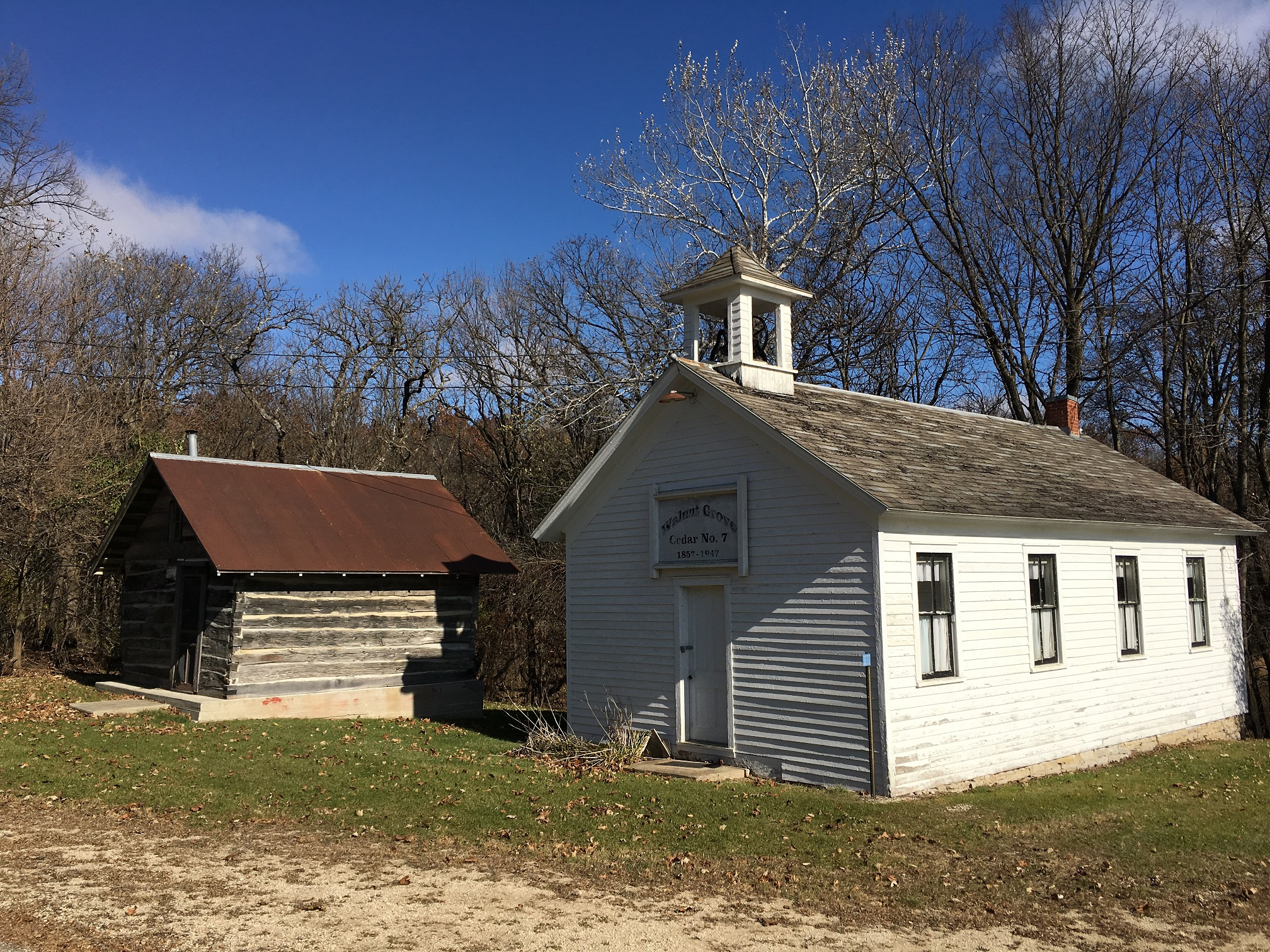

- Location within Iowa Location within the United States
- Location: 3272 Foothill Ave.
- Nearest city: Osage, Iowa
- Coordinates: 43°14′16″N 92°55′10″W
- Area: less than one acre
- Built: 1873
- NRHP reference No.: 02001028
- Added to NRHP: September 12, 2002

Walnut Grove School is a historic one-room schoolhouse located in the ghost town of Meroa, located to the southwest of Osage in rural Mitchell County, Iowa, United States. It was in operation from 1857 to 1946, and it educated anywhere from five to thirty-three student at a time. The frame structure built on a limestone foundation was constructed in 1873 on the same site as the building it replaced. A bell tower with a cast iron bell is located on the gable roof above the main entrance. Its property is on the edge of a timber along Rock Creek. In 1911 there were 88 one-room school houses in Mitchell County. This is the only one that is unaltered and in its original location. The area was settled by Norwegian pioneers in 1853. They named their small town Meroa, which has been reduced to his old schoolhouse, a Lutheran church, a cemetery, and a few houses. The building was listed on the National Register of Historic Places in 2002.
