= Charles Walter Hart House =

Historic house in Iowa, United States

- U.S. National Register of Historic Places
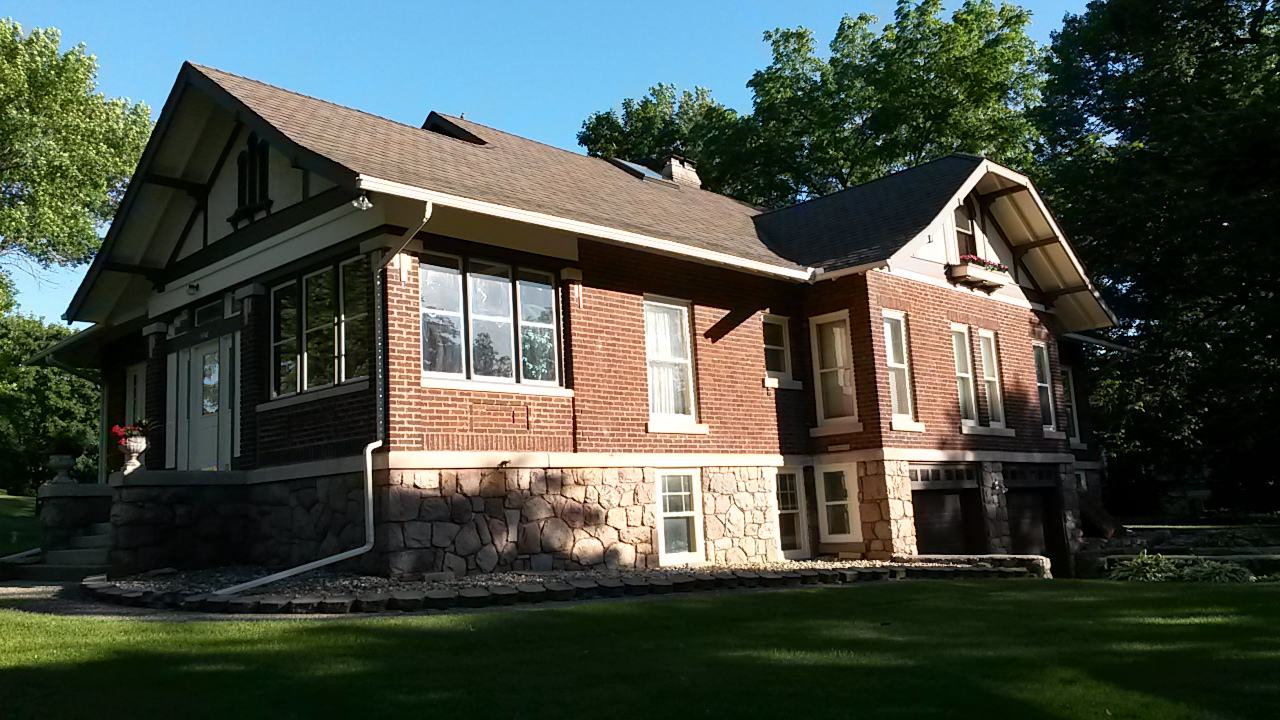

- Location within Iowa Location within the United States
- Location: 800 3rd Ave. Charles City, Iowa
- Coordinates: 43°03′55″N 92°39′38″W
- Area: less than one acre
- Built: 1913-1914
- Architectural style: Bungalow/Craftsman; Prairie School
- NRHP reference No.: 80001450
- Added to NRHP: January 25, 1980

The Charles Walter Hart House is a historic building located in Charles City, Iowa, United States. It was listed on the National Register of Historic Places in 1980. The hollow clay tile structure completed in 1914 is faced with rockfaced granite on the basement level, brick on the first floor, and stucco-half-timberwork on the gable ends. The Bungalow combines elements of the American Craftsman and Prairie School styles.

The house's primary significance is its association with Charles Walter Hart, who lived here from 1914 to 1918. He, along with Charles Henry Parr, founded the Hart-Parr Co. in Charles City. It was the first business in the country to exclusively manufacture farm tractors. Parr was more of the inventor while Hart was more of a manager. During World War I the plant produced shells for the United States Army. After the war Hart sold his interests in the business and moved to Montana, where he was engaged in wheat farming and small-scale oil refining. Eventually, Hart-Parr was one of four companies that merged to form Oliver Farm Equipment Company.
