= Nels Severson Barn =

- U.S. National Register of Historic Places
- Location within Iowa Location within the United States
- Location: North of Carpenter
- Coordinates: 43°25′21″N 93°0′40″W
- Built: 1867
- NRHP reference No.: 77000540
- Added to NRHP: July 15, 1977

The Nels Severson Barn, also known as "Fort" Severson, is a historic barn located north of Carpenter in rural Mitchell County, Iowa, United States. It is a two-story structure composed of irregularly-cut limestone with a gable roof. Its walls are 18 inches (46 cm) thick. It is one of a few, and possibly the only, stone structure in the area. The barn was built by Norwegian immigrant Nels Severson in 1867. He and his brother Ole were early settlers in this region. Local tradition refers to the building as a fort. Its large size and sturdy construction would protect the white settlers from Indian attacks. It is also said that it was a stop on a stage coach line. While the latter might be true, there is no evidence to corroborate either tradition. The barn was listed on the National Register of Historic Places in 1977.
