= Charles Walter Hart =

American engineer, inventor, and businessman

Charles Walter Hart (July 6, 1872 – March 14, 1937) was an American mechanical engineer, inventor, and businessman. Together with Charles Henry Parr, he founded a company that produced a commercially successful line of gasoline-powered tractors. After being forced out of his company in 1917, he went on to work on further development of the tractor and later, started an oil refinery.

== Biography ==
He was born in Charles City, Floyd County, Iowa, in 1872. His company, Hart-Parr Gasoline Engine Company, known as the "founders of the tractor industry", coined the word tractor. First enrolling at the Iowa State College of Agriculture and Mechanical Arts at the age of 20, he transferred to the University of Wisconsin (now University of Wisconsin–Madison). It was here that he met Charles H. Parr, and the two young men quickly became friends. Together they worked on their university thesis, which consisted of building three working internal combustion engines. One of these engines is still on display at the school today. Despite owning three farms near Charles City, Iowa, Hart's father considered his son's experiments "folly".

In April 1897, J.H. Bowman joined Hart and Parr on a three-member board of directors after his $3,000 investment in Hart-Parr. In October 1897, Wisconsin Engineer featured Hart and Parr as they discussed their final draft of the thesis on the internal combustion engine.

In 1898, Hart married Jessie Case on February 14.

In 1916, Hart wrote an article in Farm Implement News, advocating for the 60-horsepower, 8-bottom plow tractor, versus the smaller 2-plow tractors.

By 1917, however, Hart left Hart-Parr after a disagreement with Charles City bankers. He then moved to Montana and created the Hart Refinery in Hedgesville. This company supplied gas and petroleum products to the ten filling stations owned by Hart. He expanded his refinery business in Missoula, Montana, and remained in the oil refinery business until his death in 1937. Parr gave the eulogy at his funeral. Hart is buried in Riverside Cemetery, Charles City, Iowa.

In 1929, Hart-Parr was one of the four companies that merged to form Oliver Farm Equipment Company.

His home from 1914 through 1918, the Charles Walter Hart House, is on the US National Register of Historic Places.
