= River Street Bridge (Marble Rock, Iowa) =

- U.S. National Register of Historic Places
- Location within Iowa Location within the United States
- Location: River St. over drainage ditch, Marble Rock, Iowa
- Coordinates: 42°58′0″N 92°52′09.5″W
- Area: less than one acre
- Built: 1912
- Built by: Miller-Hey Construction Co.
- Architect: Miller-Hey Construction Co.
- Architectural style: Concrete deck girder, "Faux arch"
- MPS: Highway Bridges of Iowa MPS
- NRHP reference No.: 98000778
- Added to NRHP: June 25, 1998

The River Street Bridge at Marble Rock, Iowa, also known as Richard W. "Dick" Weldon River Street Bridge, has the appearance of a being a filled spandrel deck arch bridge, but it is not. When it was built in 1912, concrete girders were relatively new, and this was built with straight ones in three 30-foot (9.1 m) sections, by the Miller-Hey Construction Company of Des Moines, in one of its first contracts. The straight girders carried the load, and it is a girder bridge. However this was given a touch of elegance by its arched spandrels, which usually appear above load-bearing arches in deck arch bridges.

Thousands of small concrete deck girder bridges subsequently have been built throughout Iowa following the design standard set by the Iowa State Highway Commission (ISHC) in 1913. The River Street Bridge and only a few others preceded that standard, only a few of which remain in use, while the River Street Bridge has carried traffic with no significant change to the bridge up to the 1994 date of its National Register of Historic Places nomination. The nomination in part reads:

Of these pre-ISHC bridges - and among all of Iowa's deck girders, actually - the River Street Bridge is unique for its faux arch design. The arched form was generally held to be the most aesthetically successful configuration for urban bridges for its symmetry and associations with classical architecture. The River Street Bridge acknowledges this sense of aesthetic in its arched spandrels. A simple beam bridge in arch clothing, it is a noteworthy, small-scale exercise in urban bridge design.

The bridge was listed on the National Register of Historic Places in 1998.
