= Sherman Nursery Company Historic District =

Historic district in Iowa, United States

- Sherman Nursery Company; Historic District
- U.S. National Register of Historic Places
- U.S. Historic district
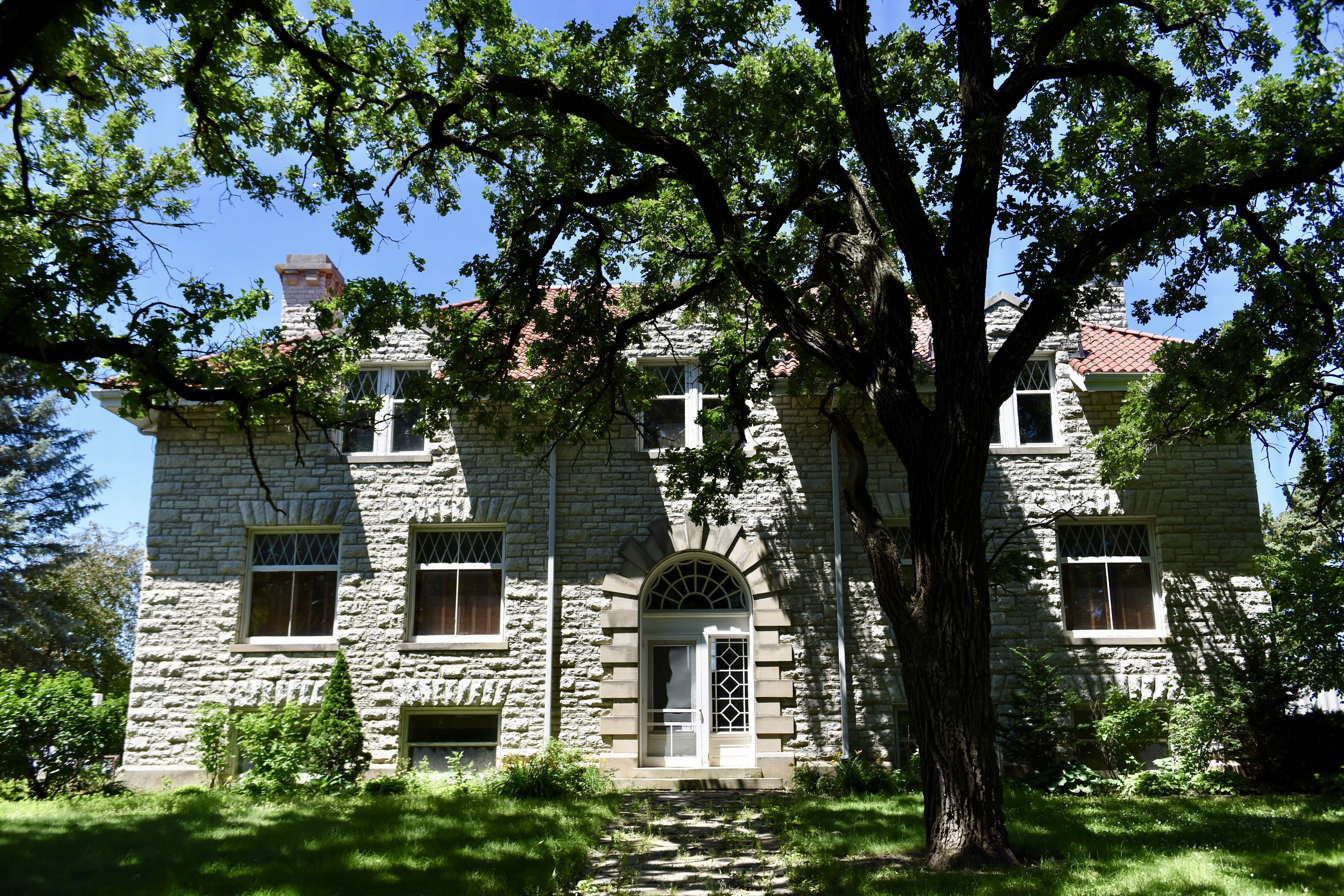

- Location within Iowa Location within the United States
- Location: 1300 Grove St. Charles City, Iowa
- Coordinates: 43°03′54″N 92°41′21″W
- NRHP reference No.: 14000905
- Added to NRHP: November 12, 2014

The Sherman Nursery Company Historic District is a nationally recognized historic district located in Charles City, Iowa, United States. It was listed on the National Register of Historic Places in 2014. The district includes a two-story stone office building that was built in 1902 and three stone bridges. The nursery was founded and developed by E. M. Sherman (1862-1934). By the 1920s it grew to "become the largest grower of evergreens in the world, with more than 50,000,000 pieces in the field." It was also known for its roses. The adjacent Wildwood Park was part of the Sherman property until 1912 when E.M. and Gertrude Sherman sold the property to the city for the park. In 2020, the Sherman Nursery property was bought by private investors, then renovated, and is now home to a law firm. The plant nursery closed in 2021.
