= Brooks Round Barn =

- U.S. National Register of Historic Places

- Location within Iowa Location within the United States
- Location: West of U.S. Route 218
- Nearest city: Nashua, Iowa
- Coordinates: 42°57′0″N 92°35′4″W
- Built: 1914
- Built by: Emil Cable
- MPS: Iowa Round Barns: The Sixty Year Experiment TR
- NRHP reference No.: 86001429
- Added to NRHP: June 30, 1986

The Brooks Round Barn was a historical building located near Nashua in rural Floyd County, Iowa, United States. It was built in 1914 by Emil Cable, with Dale Butler as the supervisor. The building was a true round barn that measured 74 feet (22.6 m) in diameter. It was constructed of clay tile and featured a two-pitch roof and a 16-foot (4.9 m) central clay tile silo. The interior featured stanchions around the silo on the ground floor, double horse stalls and grain bins in a circular arrangement on the main floor, and a hayloft. The barn was listed on the National Register of Historic Places in 1986. It was destroyed in 1995.
