= Charles Henry Parr =

American mechanical engineer and inventor

Charles Henry Parr

Charles Henry Parr (March 18, 1868 – June 10, 1941) was an American mechanical engineer, inventor, and pioneer in developing the gasoline-powered agricultural tractor and cofounder of the Hart-Parr Company.

== Early life and education ==
Parr was born March 18, 1868, in Wisconsin, the son of Martha and John Parr. He had five siblings. He attended high school in Dodgeville, Wisconsin, before attaining a degree in mechanical engineering from the University of Wisconsin–Madison, where he met his future partner, Charles Walter Hart. Both men graduated with honors.

== Career ==
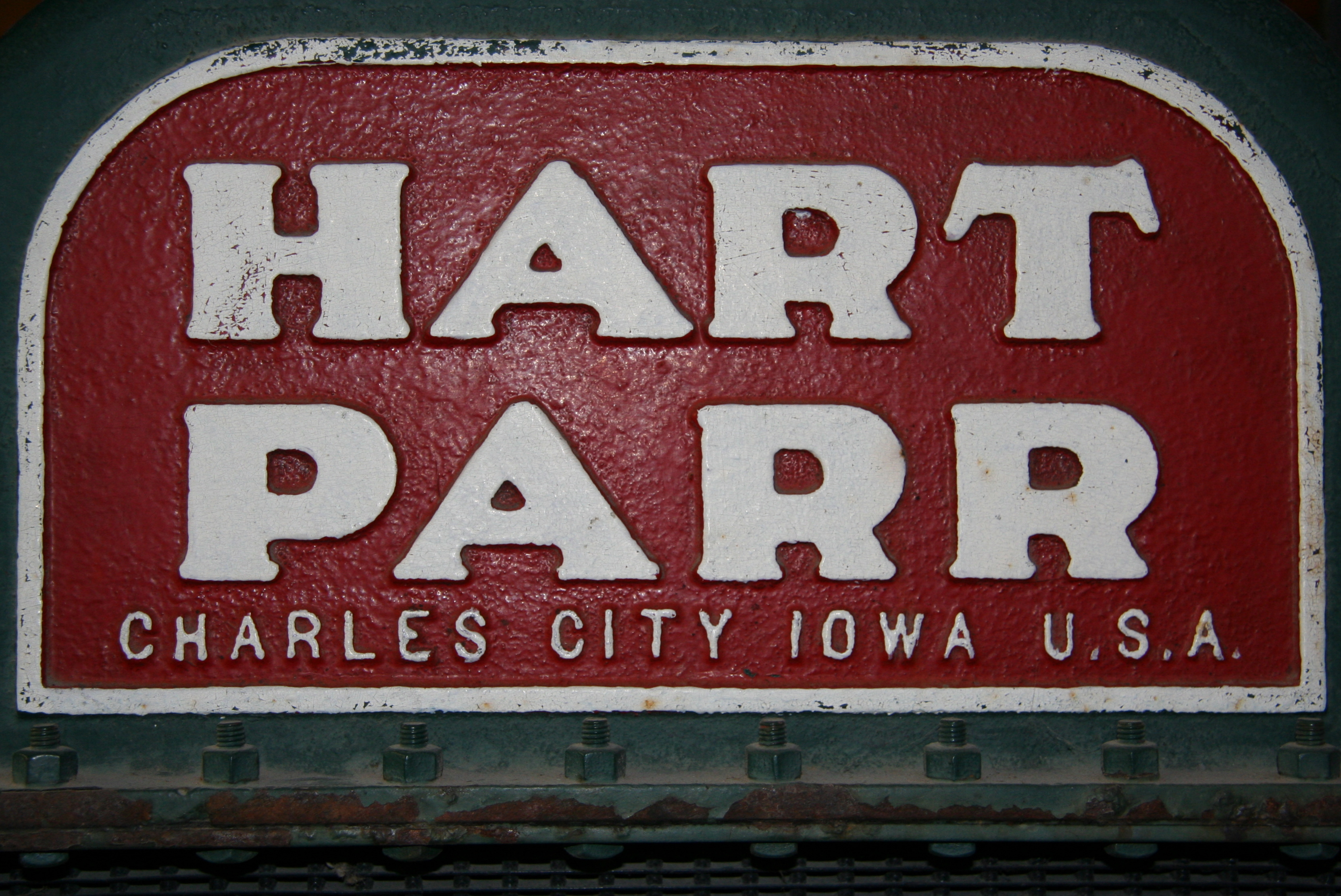
The front nameplate of a Hart Parr tractor, built before 1930 in Charles City, Iowa, preserved in the Fillmore County History Center Museum in Fountain, Minnesota

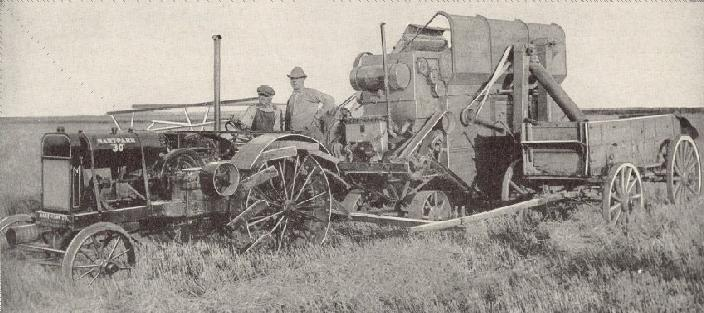
Hart-Parr tractor

After graduation, while still in Madison, Parr and Harr established a small engine company. They then moved to Charles City, Iowa, where Hart was born, and started the Hart-Parr Company. In 1902, they developed a gasoline engine for tractors and one year later invented the first known kerosene-run engine, which needed just 50% of the fuel that ran the gasoline engine. Also 1903, they built the country's first internal combustion engine. For a time, Hart-Parr tractors were a leading type, sold in the US and other countries. During World War I, the company also made shells for the army.

Parr left the company in 1923 to work for the Street Sweeper Company in Elgin, Illinois, but returned and stayed with Hart-Parr and the successor Oliver Farm Equipment Company until he died in 1941.

== Personal life ==
He married Gertrude Gates of Beloit, Wisconsin, in August 1898. They had a son and five daughters. He served on the library and school boards and was a leader of the First Congregationalist Church. He was also an active member of the Freemasons, including high priest of the Royal Arch Masons and commander of the Knights Templar. During a family vacation to Los Angeles, California, Parr died on June 10, 1941. Gertrude died months earlier, February 17, 1941. They are buried at Riverside Cemetery, Charles City, Iowa.

His home, the Charles Henry Parr House, in Charles City, Iowa is listed on the National Register of Historic Places.
