= Mitchell Powerhouse and Dam =

- U.S. National Register of Historic Places
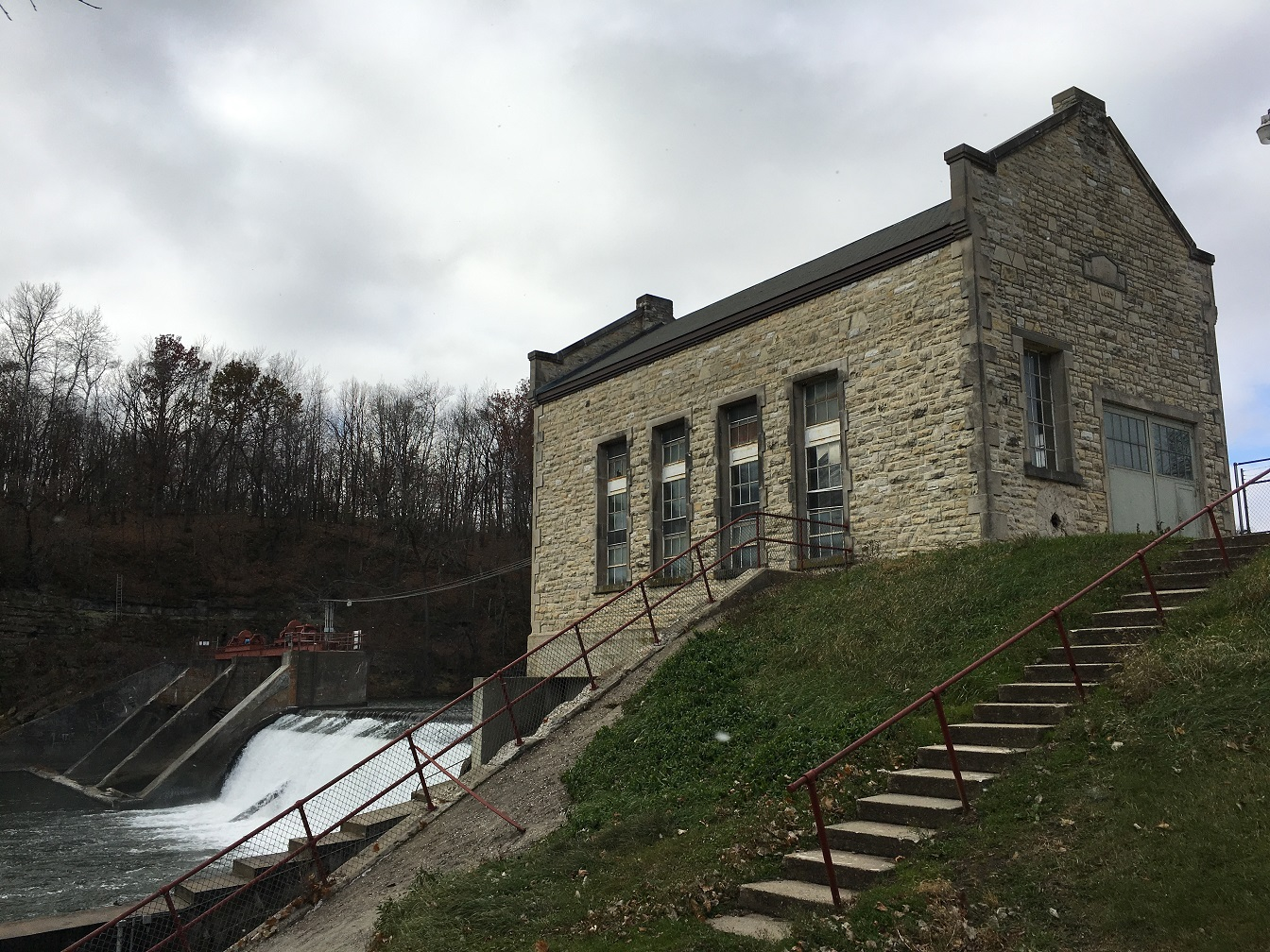

- Location within Iowa Location within the United States
- Location: Red Cedar River; Mitchell, Iowa
- Coordinates: 43°19′06″N 92°52′51″W
- Area: less than one acre
- Built: 1925
- Built by: Fargo Engineering Co.
- NRHP reference No.: 78001246
- Added to NRHP: December 8, 1978

Mitchell Powerhouse and Dam is a historic structure located in Mitchell, Iowa, United States. The west side of town along the Cedar River developed into a processing and manufacturing area, and its mills were powered by the river's current. They all became obsolete and closed around the turn of the 20th century. In 1917 the Northeastern Iowa Power Co. was incorporated at Clermont, Iowa, and in 1924 they hired the Fargo Engineering Company of Jackson, Michigan to build the powerhouse and dam at Mitchell. It was completed the following year. The concrete dam is composed of a 100-foot (30 m) permanent crest and two 32-foot (9.8 m) wide tainter gates. A third gate was converted into a permanent concrete spillway. The powerhouse is a single-story structure composed of rock faced limestone that was laid in a random ashlar pattern. Northeastern Iowa Power Company was transferred to the Central States Power and Light Company, who was in turn transferred to the Interstate Power Company. The Mitchell County Conservation Board acquired the dam, powerhouse, and the adjacent land, which it turned into a public park in 1963. The facility was listed on the National Register of Historic Places in 1978.
