= Rockford Mill =

- U.S. National Register of Historic Places
- Location within Iowa Location within the United States
- Location: Shell Rock River at 4th and Main St. Rockford, Iowa
- Coordinates: 43°03′02″N 92°56′31″W
- Area: Less than one acre
- Built: 1871
- NRHP reference No.: 83000358
- Added to NRHP: July 28, 1983

Rockford Mill is a historic building located in Rockford, Iowa, United States. Vermont native J.T. Graham learned the milling profession in Sacramento, California during the California Gold Rush. After moving to Iowa in 1853 he built and operated several mills in the state. In 1871 he built the Rockford Mill with partner D.D. Cutler. It is a two-story gable building on a stone foundation. A shed roofed addition was built onto the east side of the building later. Graham was sole proprietor after 1875. What made this mill unique in Floyd County was that 90% of the work was custom grinding. It processed wheat, buckwheat, cornmeal and feed. Several owners operated the mill after Graham's death. H.W. Winston was unsuccessful at making electricity for the town in 1899. The dam was added in 1918. Rockford Light and Power Company operated the building in 1913 and Cedar Valley Electric Company from 1916 to 1920. They combined feed milling with water and power production. Feed milling continued until World War II when it had to be suspended because of a labor shortage. By the time the war ended the mill pond had silted in and the dam deteriorated, so the operator had to rely on electrical power alone in 1952. It was the last feed mill operation left in the county by that time. The decline in farming operations brought local feed milling to an end. The building was listed on the National Register of Historic Places in 1983.
