= Wildwood Park Historic District (Charles City, Iowa) =

Historic district in Iowa, United States

- U.S. National Register of Historic Places
- U.S. Historic district
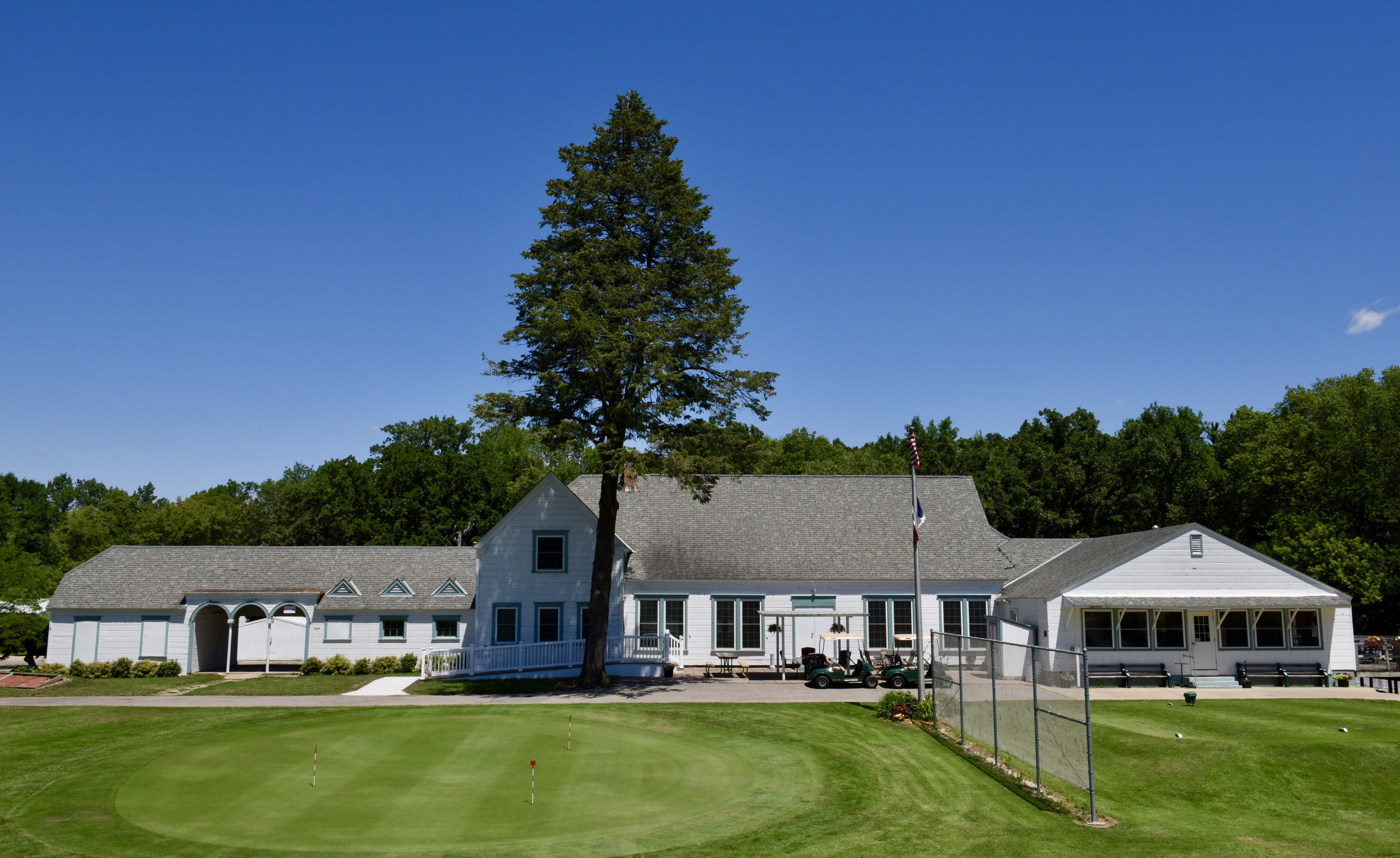
- Golf course clubhouse (1927)

- Location within Iowa Location within the United States
- Location: 1 Wildwood Rd. Charles City, Iowa
- Coordinates: 43°03′46″N 92°41′37″W
- Area: 72.5 acres (29.3 ha)
- Architectural style: Tudor Revival; American Craftsman
- MPS: Conservation Movement in Iowa MPS
- NRHP reference No.: 98001205
- Added to NRHP: September 25, 1998

Wildwood Park Historic District is a nationally recognized historic district located in Charles City, Iowa, United States. It was listed on the National Register of Historic Places in 1998. At the time of its nomination, it consisted of 26 resources, which included three contributing buildings, one contributing site, nine contributing structures, one contributing object, seven non-contributing buildings, and five non-contributing structures.

Charles City acquired the land for the park in 1912 from E.M. and Gertrude Sherman. It had been part of the Sherman Nursery Company property. Initially, it was used as a pleasure ground before a nine-hole golf course was added on the central and eastern part of the park in 1916. W. E. Fryer of Charles City designed the park's initial development plan. Part of this plan included the American Craftsman rest houses. The Charles City County Club was established in 1926 and maintained the golf course and built the Tudor Revival clubhouse in 1927. The clubhouse was designed by Waterloo architect Mortimer B. Cleveland. The country club was almost forced to disband during the Great Depression, and the clubhouse housed German Prisoners of War during World War II. The country club reorganized after the war and built a facility of their own on the east side of town.

During the Depression, the Works Progress Administration and the Civilian Conservation Corps built two footbridges, the entrance gate and wall, and a retaining wall near the gate. The amenities were built using limestone in the park rustic style. The western side of the park has four picnic areas with playground equipment from the late 1940s. The equipment, which replaced older versions from 1919, are grouped together as the historic object.
