= Stacyville, Iowa =

- City
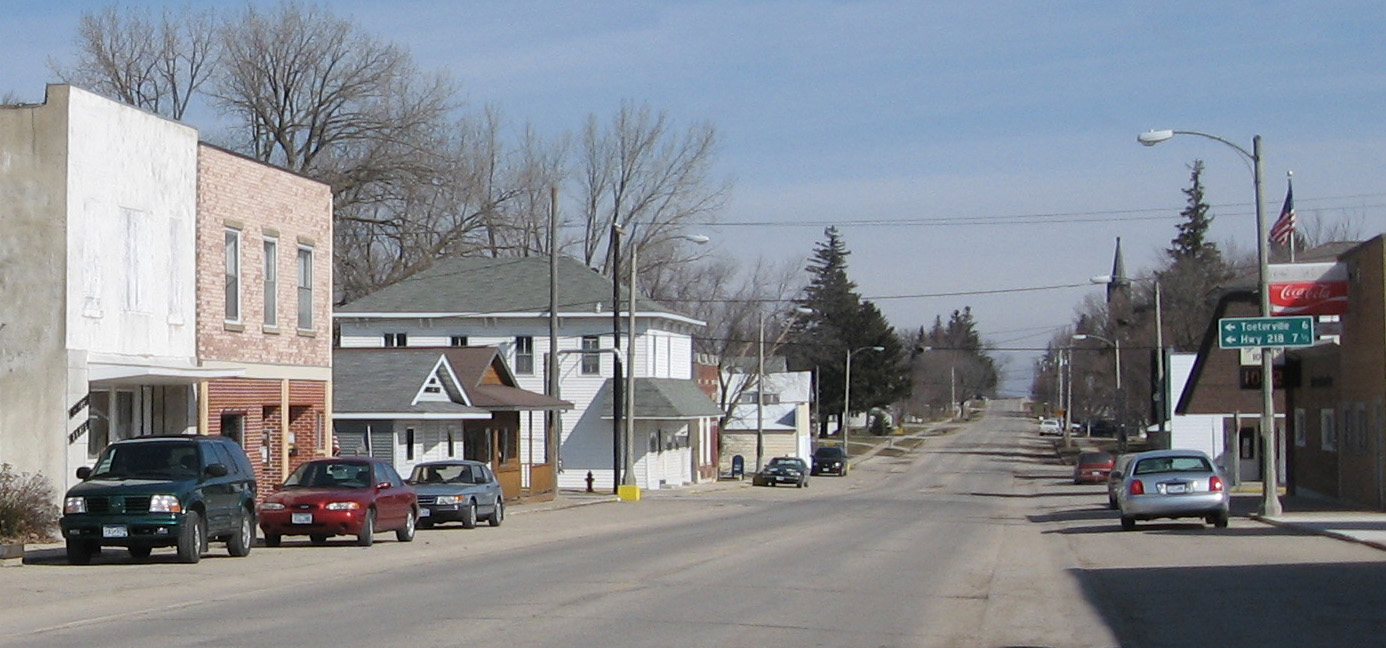
- Downtown Stacyville, Iowa.

- Location of Stacyville, Iowa
- Coordinates: 43°26′21″N 92°47′03″W
- Country: United States
- State: Iowa
- County: Mitchell

Area
  - Total: 0.54 sq mi (1.39 km^{2})
  - Land: 0.51 sq mi (1.33 km^{2})
  - Water: 0.023 sq mi (0.06 km^{2})
- Elevation: 1,204 ft (367 m)

Population (2020)
  - Total: 458
  - Density: 888.8/sq mi (343.17/km^{2})
- Time zone: UTC-6 (Central (CST))
  - Summer (DST): UTC-5 (CDT)
- ZIP code: 50476
- Area code: 641
- FIPS code: 19-74820
- GNIS feature ID: 2395947
- Website: www.stacyville.com

Stacyville is a city in Mitchell County, Iowa, United States. The population was 458 at the time of the 2020 census.

== History ==
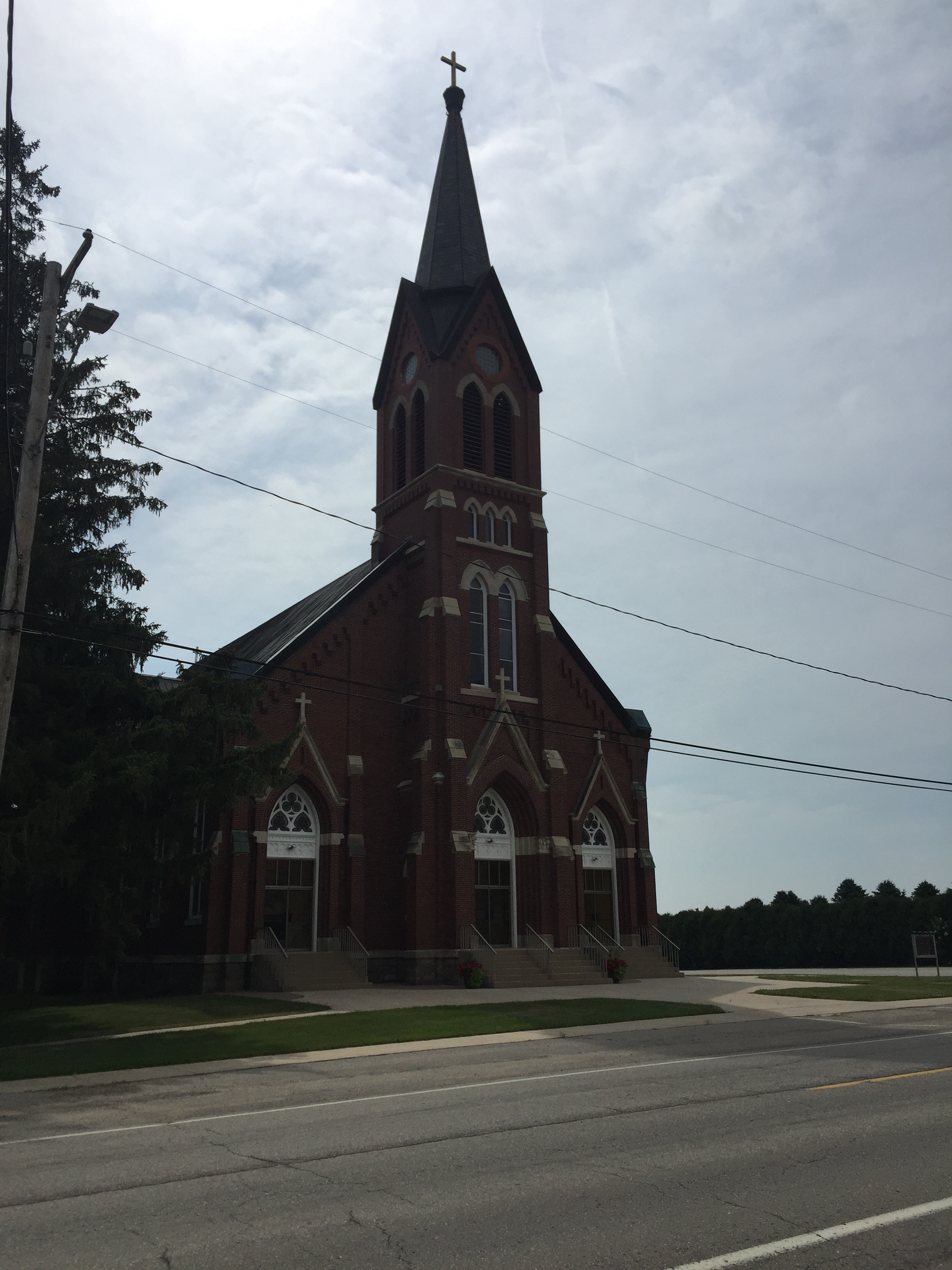
Visitation Catholic Church in Stacyville

Stacyville was platted in 1856. It was named after its founder, Homer I. Stacy.

== Geography ==
According to the United States Census Bureau, the city has a total area of 0.53 square miles (1.37 km^{2}), of which 0.51 square miles (1.32 km^{2}) is land and 0.02 square miles (0.05 km^{2}) is water.

== Demographics ==
Historical populations
Year	Pop.	±%
1880	326	—
1900	490	+50.3%
1910	407	−16.9%
1920	513	+26.0%
1930	529	+3.1%
1940	533	+0.8%
1950	544	+2.1%
1960	588	+8.1%
1970	598	+1.7%
1980	538	−10.0%
1990	481	−10.6%
2000	469	−2.5%
2010	494	+5.3%
2020	458	−7.3%
Source:"U.S. Census website". United States Census Bureau. and Iowa Data Center; Source: U.S. Decennial Census

=== 2020 census ===
As of the census of 2020, there were 458 people, 215 households, and 130 families residing in the city. The population density was 888.8 inhabitants per square mile (343.2/km^{2}). There were 249 housing units at an average density of 483.2 per square mile (186.6/km^{2}). The racial makeup of the city was 98.0% White, 0.0% Black or African American, 0.2% Native American, 0.0% Asian, 0.0% Pacific Islander, 0.2% from other races and 1.5% from two or more races. Hispanic or Latino persons of any race comprised 1.3% of the population.

Of the 215 households, 23.3% of which had children under the age of 18 living with them, 49.8% were married couples living together, 5.1% were cohabitating couples, 24.2% had a female householder with no spouse or partner present and 20.9% had a male householder with no spouse or partner present. 39.5% of all households were non-families. 35.3% of all households were made up of individuals, 20.0% had someone living alone who was 65 years old or older.

The median age in the city was 48.0 years. 21.2% of the residents were under the age of 20; 4.8% were between the ages of 20 and 24; 22.9% were from 25 and 44; 19.9% were from 45 and 64; and 31.2% were 65 years of age or older. The gender makeup of the city was 49.1% male and 50.9% female.

=== 2010 census ===
As of the census of 2010, there were 494 people, 223 households, and 123 families living in the city. The population density was 968.6 inhabitants per square mile (374.0/km^{2}). There were 255 housing units at an average density of 500.0 per square mile (193.1/km^{2}). The racial makeup of the city was 97.4% White, 0.8% African American, 0.2% Native American, 0.4% Asian, 0.2% from other races, and 1.0% from two or more races. Hispanic or Latino of any race were 1.2% of the population.

There were 223 households, of which 18.4% had children under the age of 18 living with them, 48.0% were married couples living together, 5.4% had a female householder with no husband present, 1.8% had a male householder with no wife present, and 44.8% were non-families. 39.0% of all households were made up of individuals, and 26% had someone living alone who was 65 years of age or older. The average household size was 2.10 and the average family size was 2.80.

The median age in the city was 51 years. 18.4% of residents were under the age of 18; 6.4% were between the ages of 18 and 24; 17.3% were from 25 to 44; 24.6% were from 45 to 64; and 33.6% were 65 years of age or older. The gender makeup of the city was 49.2% male and 50.8% female.

=== 2000 census ===
As of the census of 2000, there were 469 people, 211 households, and 121 families living in the city. The population density was 1,055.9 inhabitants per square mile (407.7/km^{2}). There were 228 housing units at an average density of 513.3 per square mile (198.2/km^{2}). The racial makeup of the city was 99.79% White and 0.21% Asian.

There were 211 households, out of which 19.4% had children under the age of 18 living with them, 50.2% were married couples living together, 3.3% had a female householder with no husband present, and 42.2% were non-families. 38.9% of all households were made up of individuals, and 19.9% had someone living alone who was 65 years of age or older. The average household size was 2.03 and the average family size was 2.66.

In the city, the population was spread out, with 19.4% under the age of 18, 3.0% from 18 to 24, 19.8% from 25 to 44, 20.5% from 45 to 64, and 37.3% who were 65 years of age or older. The median age was 54 years. For every 100 females, there were 100.4 males. For every 100 females age 18 and over, there were 89.0 males.

The median income for a household in the city was $31,544, and the median income for a family was $36,944. Males had a median income of $26,528 versus $26,667 for females. The per capita income for the city was $16,831. About 2.6% of families and 6.6% of the population were below the poverty line, including 10.1% of those under age 18 and 1.5% of those age 65 or over.

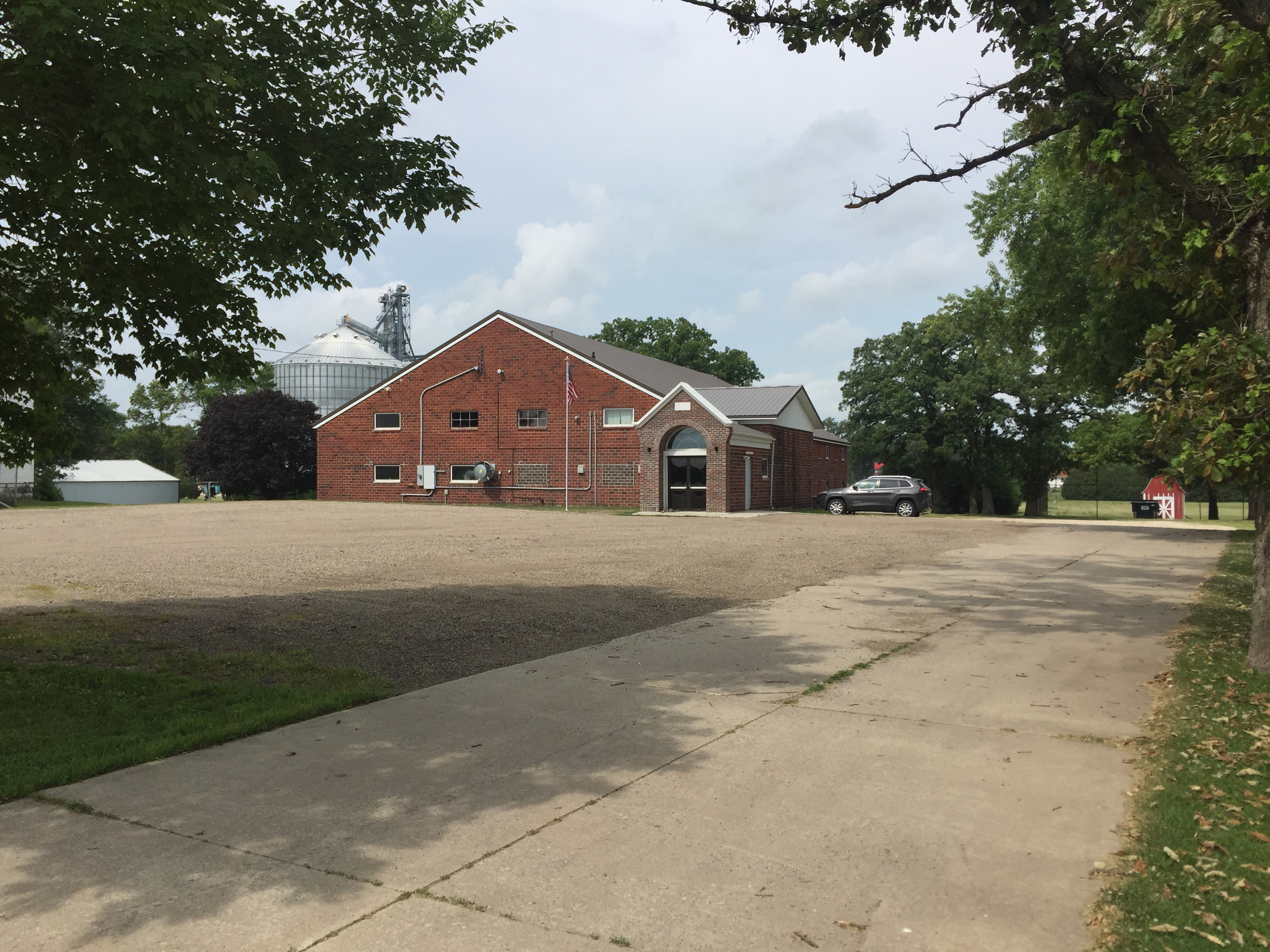
The former gym of Visitation school, Stacyville, Iowa

== Education ==
It is within the St. Ansgar Community School District school district.

Visitation School, originally serving grades K-12, occupied a main building that opened in 1923 and a gymnasium. In 1968 the high school closed, making it a K-8 school. The school closed in 2003. The main building became the site of the Stacyville Memories Museum while the Stacyville Community Center and the Kids Care Daycare Center occupied the gymnasium. In 2012 it was announced the main building was to be demolished, with the museum going to the Stacyville Library, though the gymnasium would remain.
