= Carpenter, Iowa =

- City
- Location of Carpenter, Iowa
- Coordinates: 43°24′54″N 93°01′02″W
- Country: United States
- State: Iowa
- County: Mitchell

Area
  - Total: 0.35 sq mi (0.91 km^{2})
  - Land: 0.35 sq mi (0.91 km^{2})
  - Water: 0 sq mi (0.00 km^{2})
- Elevation: 1,191 ft (363 m)

Population (2020)
  - Total: 87
  - Density: 247.9/sq mi (95.72/km^{2})
- Time zone: UTC-6 (Central (CST))
  - Summer (DST): UTC-5 (CDT)
- ZIP code: 50426
- Area code: 641
- FIPS code: 19-11035
- GNIS feature ID: 2393752

Carpenter is a city in Mitchell County, Iowa, United States. The population was 87 at the 2020 census.

== Geography ==
According to the United States Census Bureau, the city has a total area of 0.16 square miles (0.41 km^{2}), all land.

== Demographics ==
Historical populations
Year	Pop.	±%
1910	121	—
1920	144	+19.0%
1930	110	−23.6%
1940	156	+41.8%
1950	165	+5.8%
1960	177	+7.3%
1970	122	−31.1%
1980	109	−10.7%
1990	102	−6.4%
2000	130	+27.5%
2010	109	−16.2%
2020	87	−20.2%
Source:"U.S. Census website". United States Census Bureau. and Iowa Data Center; Source: U.S. Decennial Census

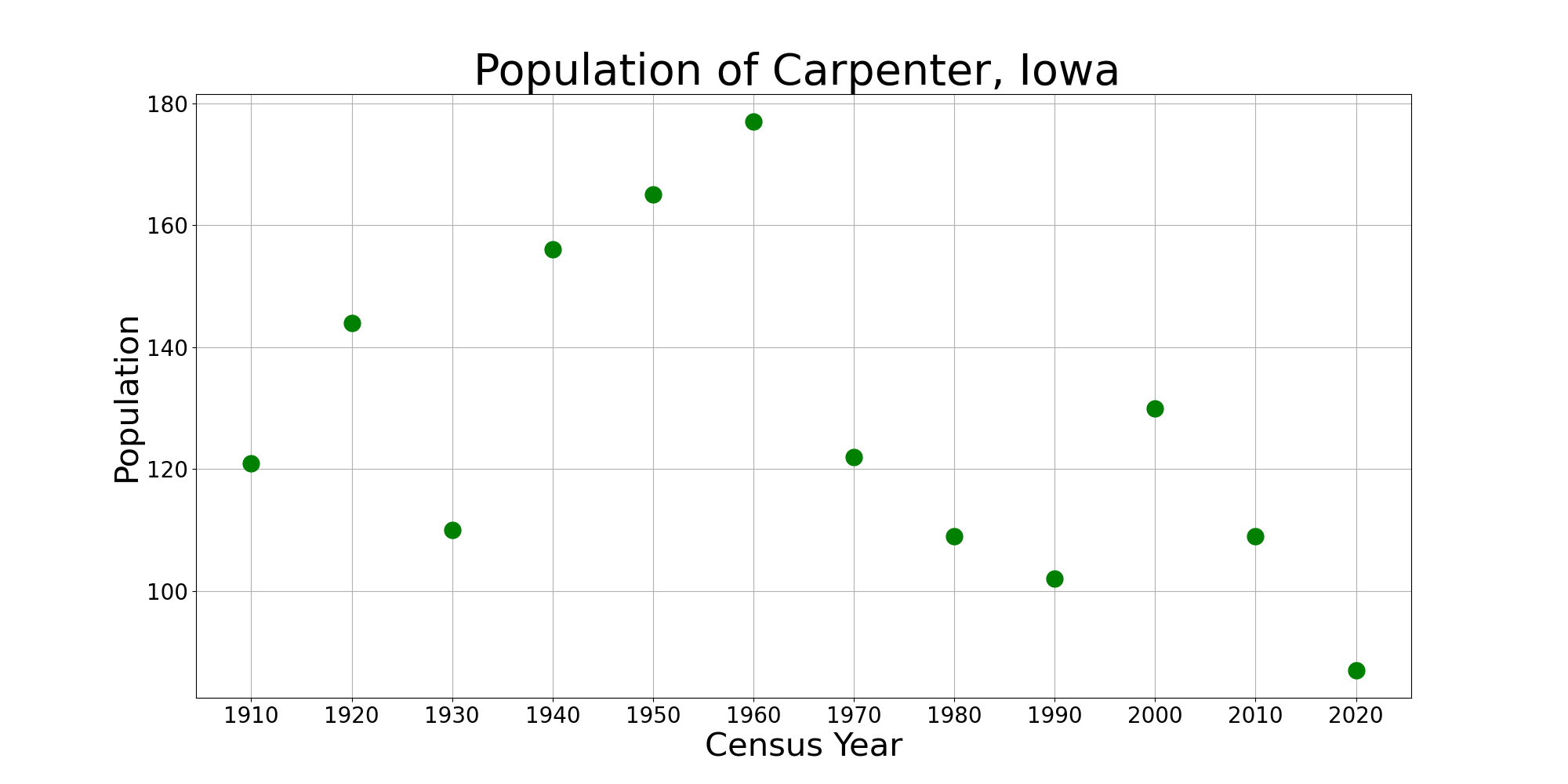
The population of Carpenter, Iowa from US census data

=== 2020 census ===
As of the census of 2020, there were 87 people, 39 households, and 24 families residing in the city. The population density was 247.9 inhabitants per square mile (95.7/km^{2}). There were 57 housing units at an average density of 162.4 per square mile (62.7/km^{2}). The racial makeup of the city was 100.0% White, 0.0% Black or African American, 0.0% Native American, 0.0% Asian, 0.0% Pacific Islander, 0.0% from other races and 0.0% from two or more races. Hispanic or Latino persons of any race comprised 1.1% of the population.

Of the 39 households, 20.5% of which had children under the age of 18 living with them, 48.7% were married couples living together, 2.6% were cohabitating couples, 15.4% had a female householder with no spouse or partner present and 33.3% had a male householder with no spouse or partner present. 38.5% of all households were non-families. 35.9% of all households were made up of individuals, 20.5% had someone living alone who was 65 years old or older.

The median age in the city was 54.8 years. 8.0% of the residents were under the age of 20; 5.7% were between the ages of 20 and 24; 23.0% were from 25 and 44; 41.4% were from 45 and 64; and 21.8% were 65 years of age or older. The gender makeup of the city was 50.6% male and 49.4% female.

=== 2010 census ===
As of the census of 2010, there were 109 people, 47 households, and 27 families living in the city. The population density was 681.3 inhabitants per square mile (263.1/km^{2}). There were 51 housing units at an average density of 318.8 per square mile (123.1/km^{2}). The racial makeup of the city was 98.2% White and 1.8% African American.

There were 47 households, of which 29.8% had children under the age of 18 living with them, 51.1% were married couples living together, 6.4% had a female householder with no husband present, and 42.6% were non-families. 38.3% of all households were made up of individuals, and 14.9% had someone living alone who was 65 years of age or older. The average household size was 2.32 and the average family size was 3.15.

The median age in the city was 40.8 years. 26.6% of residents were under the age of 18; 8.3% were between the ages of 18 and 24; 20.2% were from 25 to 44; 28.4% were from 45 to 64; and 16.5% were 65 years of age or older. The gender makeup of the city was 51.4% male and 48.6% female.

=== 2000 census ===
As of the census of 2000, there were 130 people, 50 households, and 30 families living in the city. The population density was 813.9 inhabitants per square mile (314.2/km^{2}). There were 54 housing units at an average density of 338.1 per square mile (130.5/km^{2}). The racial makeup of the city was 100.00% White.

There were 50 households, out of which 40.0% had children under the age of 18 living with them, 46.0% were married couples living together, 8.0% had a female householder with no husband present, and 40.0% were non-families. 34.0% of all households were made up of individuals, and 10.0% had someone living alone who was 65 years of age or older. The average household size was 2.60 and the average family size was 3.43.

In the city, the population was spread out, with 36.9% under the age of 18, 6.9% from 18 to 24, 28.5% from 25 to 44, 14.6% from 45 to 64, and 13.1% who were 65 years of age or older. The median age was 31 years. For every 100 females, there were 91.2 males. For every 100 females age 18 and over, there were 90.7 males.

The median income for a household in the city was $27,500, and the median income for a family was $34,167. Males had a median income of $28,333 versus $22,500 for females. The per capita income for the city was $14,864. There were 10.0% of families and 5.3% of the population living below the poverty line, including no under eighteens and 20.0% of those over 64.

== Attractions ==
Carpenter is known for hosting summer softball league play at its two lighted ballfields, part of the Carpenter Community Center. The Community Center is the former gymnasium of Carpenter's high school, which consolidated with St. Ansgar schools in the 1960s. The gymnasium is frequently rented out for private events, dances and weddings.

== Notable person ==
- "Top Chef" contestant Carrie Mashaney grew up in Carpenter.
