= Marble Rock, Iowa =

- City
- Motto: Bike to Marble Rock for a 'Marbleous' Time!
- Location of Marble Rock, Iowa
- Coordinates: 42°57′46″N 92°52′18″W
- Country: US
- State: Iowa
- County: Floyd

Area
  - Total: 0.87 sq mi (2.25 km^{2})
  - Land: 0.83 sq mi (2.16 km^{2})
  - Water: 0.039 sq mi (0.10 km^{2})
- Elevation: 1,001 ft (305 m)

Population (2020)
  - Total: 271
  - Density: 325.6/sq mi (125.72/km^{2})
- Time zone: UTC-6 (Central (CST))
  - Summer (DST): UTC-5 (CDT)
- ZIP code: 50653
- Area code: 641
- FIPS code: 19-49305
- GNIS feature ID: 2395001

Marble Rock is a city in Floyd County, Iowa, United States, along the Shell Rock River. The population was 271 at the time of the 2020 census. Marble Rock has a city park, historical museums, a powerhouse on the river, and a veterans' memorial. The Marble Rock Historical Society has a website with information about the museums.

== Geography ==
Marble Rock's name derives from the presence of white limestone in the area. The Shell Rock River runs through the west side of town and is available for fishermen and small watercraft. There is a portage around the dam, on the west side of the river, for canoes.

According to the United States Census Bureau, the city has a total area of 0.87 square miles (2.25 km^{2}), of which 0.83 square miles (2.15 km^{2}) is land and 0.04 square miles (0.10 km^{2}) is water.

== Demographics ==
Historical populations
Year	Pop.	±%
1880	409	—
1890	433	+5.9%
1900	573	+32.3%
1910	480	−16.2%
1920	483	+0.6%
1930	441	−8.7%
1940	660	+49.7%
1950	470	−28.8%
1960	442	−6.0%
1970	461	+4.3%
1980	419	−9.1%
1990	361	−13.8%
2000	326	−9.7%
2010	307	−5.8%
2020	271	−11.7%
Source:"U.S. Census website". United States Census Bureau. and Iowa Data Center; Source: U.S. Decennial Census

=== 2020 census ===
As of the census of 2020, there were 271 people, 126 households, and 76 families residing in the city. The population density was 325.6 inhabitants per square mile (125.7/km^{2}). There were 138 housing units at an average density of 165.8 per square mile (64.0/km^{2}). The racial makeup of the city was 98.9% White, 0.0% Black or African American, 0.0% Native American, 0.0% Asian, 0.0% Pacific Islander, 0.0% from other races and 1.1% from two or more races. Hispanic or Latino persons of any race comprised 0.4% of the population.

Of the 126 households, 27.0% of which had children under the age of 18 living with them, 40.5% were married couples living together, 14.3% were cohabitating couples, 26.2% had a female householder with no spouse or partner present and 19.0% had a male householder with no spouse or partner present. 39.7% of all households were non-families. 34.1% of all households were made up of individuals, 20.6% had someone living alone who was 65 years old or older.

The median age in the city was 46.3 years. 24.4% of the residents were under the age of 20; 5.5% were between the ages of 20 and 24; 17.3% were from 25 and 44; 28.8% were from 45 and 64; and 24.0% were 65 years of age or older. The gender makeup of the city was 50.6% male and 49.4% female.

=== 2010 census ===
As of the census of 2010, there were 307 people, 134 households, and 84 families residing in the city. The population density was 369.9 inhabitants per square mile (142.8/km^{2}). There were 150 housing units at an average density of 180.7 per square mile (69.8/km^{2}). The racial makeup of the city was 99.0% White, 0.3% Asian, and 0.7% from two or more races.

There were 134 households, of which 27.6% had children under the age of 18 living with them, 50.0% were married couples living together, 8.2% had a female householder with no husband present, 4.5% had a male householder with no wife present, and 37.3% were non-families. 32.1% of all households were made up of individuals, and 13.4% had someone living alone who was 65 years of age or older. The average household size was 2.29 and the average family size was 2.85.

The median age in the city was 47.5 years. 21.8% of residents were under the age of 18; 5.2% were between the ages of 18 and 24; 20.4% were from 25 to 44; 32.2% were from 45 to 64; and 20.2% were 65 years of age or older. The gender makeup of the city was 48.9% male and 51.1% female.

=== 2000 census ===
As of the census of 2000, there were 326 people, 141 households, and 95 families residing in the city. The population density was 390.1 inhabitants per square mile (150.6/km^{2}). There were 157 housing units at an average density of 187.9 per square mile (72.5/km^{2}). The racial makeup of the city was 99.39% White, and 0.61% from two or more races.

There were 141 households, out of which 26.2% had children under the age of 18 living with them, 54.6% were married couples living together, 7.1% had a female householder with no husband present, and 32.6% were non-families. 30.5% of all households were made up of individuals, and 18.4% had someone living alone who was 65 years of age or older. The average household size was 2.31 and the average family size was 2.78.

In the city, the population was spread out, with 21.5% under the age of 18, 10.4% from 18 to 24, 22.4% from 25 to 44, 25.2% from 45 to 64, and 20.6% who were 65 years of age or older. The median age was 42 years. For every 100 females, there were 100.0 males. For every 100 females age 18 and over, there were 96.9 males.

The median income for a household in the city was $35,500, and the median income for a family was $38,750. Males had a median income of $27,917 versus $24,688 for females. The per capita income for the city was $17,937. About 4.2% of families and 7.2% of the population were below the poverty line, including 15.4% of those under age 18 and 9.7% of those age 65 or over.

== Education ==
The Rudd-Rockford-Marble Rock Community School District operates area public schools.
