= Osage, Iowa =

- City
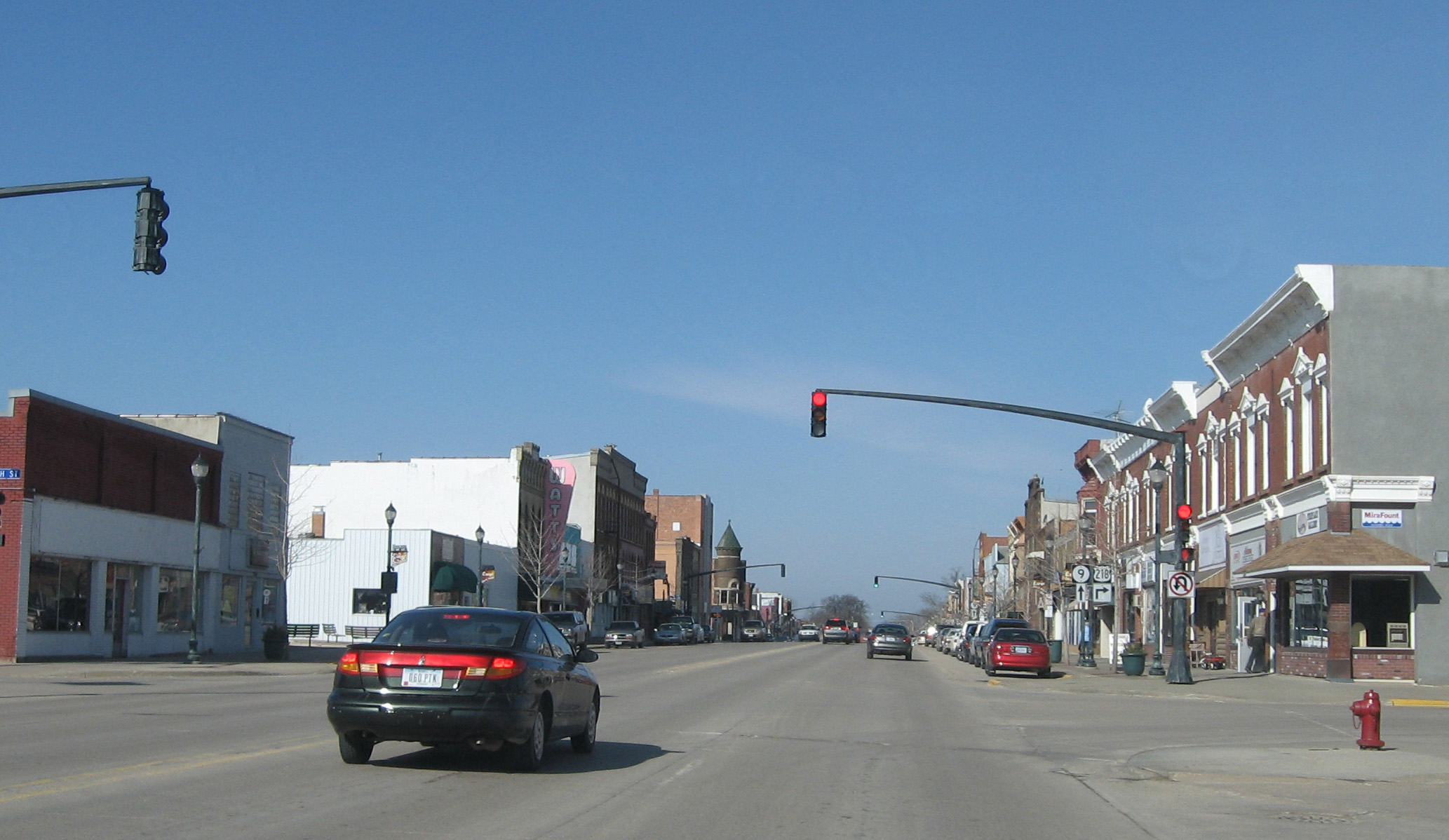
- Downtown Osage, Iowa.

- Location of Osage, Iowa
- Coordinates: 43°16′58″N 92°48′41″W
- Country: United States
- State: Iowa
- County: Mitchell
- Incorporated: April 14, 1871

Area
  - Total: 2.24 sq mi (5.81 km^{2})
  - Land: 2.24 sq mi (5.81 km^{2})
  - Water: 0 sq mi (0.00 km^{2})
- Elevation: 1,175 ft (358 m)

Population (2020)
  - Total: 3,627
  - Density: 1,617.8/sq mi (624.63/km^{2})
- Time zone: UTC-6 (Central (CST))
  - Summer (DST): UTC-5 (CDT)
- ZIP codes: 50454, 50461
- Area code: 641
- FIPS code: 19-59745
- GNIS feature ID: 2396088
- Website: osageia.org

Osage is a city and the county seat of Mitchell County, Iowa, United States. The population was 3,627 at the time of the 2020 census.

== Geography ==
According to the United States Census Bureau, the city has a total area of 2.24 square miles (5.80 km^{2}), all land.

=== Climate ===
Climate data for Osage, Iowa (1991–2020 normals, extremes 1894–present)
Month	Jan	Feb	Mar	Apr	May	Jun	Jul	Aug	Sep	Oct	Nov	Dec	Year
Record high °F (°C)	61 (16)	63 (17)	84 (29)	92 (33)	105 (41)	105 (41)	107 (42)	103 (39)	101 (38)	93 (34)	78 (26)	68 (20)	107 (42)
Mean daily maximum °F (°C)	23.2 (−4.9)	27.9 (−2.3)	40.9 (4.9)	56.1 (13.4)	68.2 (20.1)	78.0 (25.6)	81.4 (27.4)	79.1 (26.2)	73.0 (22.8)	59.6 (15.3)	42.7 (5.9)	29.2 (−1.6)	54.9 (12.7)
Daily mean °F (°C)	14.7 (−9.6)	19.1 (−7.2)	31.9 (−0.1)	45.5 (7.5)	57.8 (14.3)	68.0 (20.0)	71.6 (22.0)	69.1 (20.6)	61.7 (16.5)	48.6 (9.2)	33.9 (1.1)	21.4 (−5.9)	45.3 (7.4)
Mean daily minimum °F (°C)	6.2 (−14.3)	10.3 (−12.1)	22.9 (−5.1)	35.0 (1.7)	47.4 (8.6)	58.1 (14.5)	61.7 (16.5)	59.0 (15.0)	50.3 (10.2)	37.6 (3.1)	25.0 (−3.9)	13.6 (−10.2)	35.6 (2.0)
Record low °F (°C)	−35 (−37)	−35 (−37)	−27 (−33)	6 (−14)	21 (−6)	34 (1)	42 (6)	37 (3)	20 (−7)	−4 (−20)	−15 (−26)	−30 (−34)	−35 (−37)
Average precipitation inches (mm)	1.17 (30)	1.25 (32)	1.91 (49)	4.01 (102)	5.19 (132)	5.57 (141)	4.97 (126)	3.95 (100)	3.51 (89)	2.73 (69)	1.84 (47)	1.51 (38)	37.61 (955)
Average snowfall inches (cm)	9.9 (25)	9.2 (23)	6.2 (16)	2.2 (5.6)	0.4 (1.0)	0.0 (0.0)	0.0 (0.0)	0.0 (0.0)	0.0 (0.0)	0.2 (0.51)	1.9 (4.8)	9.6 (24)	39.6 (101)
Average precipitation days (≥ 0.01 in)	5.3	4.8	6.7	9.0	12.0	10.9	8.3	8.7	7.7	7.0	5.3	5.8	91.5
Average snowy days (≥ 0.1 in)	4.7	4.5	2.7	0.9	0.1	0.0	0.0	0.0	0.0	0.2	1.2	4.3	18.6
Source: NOAA

== Demographics ==
Historical populations
Year	Pop.	±%
1870	1,400	—
1880	2,012	+43.7%
1890	1,913	−4.9%
1900	2,734	+42.9%
1910	2,445	−10.6%
1920	2,878	+17.7%
1930	2,964	+3.0%
1940	3,196	+7.8%
1950	3,436	+7.5%
1960	3,753	+9.2%
1970	3,815	+1.7%
1980	3,718	−2.5%
1990	3,439	−7.5%
2000	3,451	+0.3%
2010	3,619	+4.9%
2020	3,627	+0.2%
Source:"U.S. Census website". United States Census Bureau. and Iowa Data Center; Source: U.S. Decennial Census

=== 2020 census ===
As of the 2020 census, there were 3,627 people, 1,620 households, and 914 families residing in the city. The population density was 1,617.8 inhabitants per square mile (624.6/km^{2}). There were 1,806 housing units at an average density of 805.5 per square mile (311.0/km^{2}), of which 10.3% were vacant. The homeowner vacancy rate was 2.6% and the rental vacancy rate was 16.2%.

Of the 1,620 households, 24.6% had children under the age of 18 living in them, 42.0% were married couples living together, 6.4% were cohabitating couples, 32.3% had a female householder with no spouse or partner present, and 19.3% had a male householder with no spouse or partner present. 43.6% of all households were non-families; 38.3% of all households were made up of individuals, and 19.9% had someone living alone who was 65 years old or older.

The median age in the city was 45.8 years. 20.6% of residents were under the age of 18 and 25.8% were 65 years of age or older. 4.9% were between the ages of 20 and 24; 21.0% were from 25 to 44; and 25.1% were from 45 to 64. The gender makeup of the city was 47.2% male and 52.8% female. For every 100 females there were 89.4 males, and for every 100 females age 18 and over there were 85.9 males age 18 and over.

0.0% of residents lived in urban areas, while 100.0% lived in rural areas.

Racial composition as of the 2020 census
Race	Number	Percent
White	3,406	93.9%
Black or African American	28	0.8%
American Indian and Alaska Native	4	0.1%
Asian	24	0.7%
Native Hawaiian and Other Pacific Islander	3	0.1%
Some other race	26	0.7%
Two or more races	136	3.7%
Hispanic or Latino (of any race)	80	2.2%

=== 2010 census ===
As of the census of 2010, there were 3,619 people, 1,614 households, and 954 families living in the city. The population density was 1,615.6 inhabitants per square mile (623.8/km^{2}). There were 1,756 housing units at an average density of 783.9 per square mile (302.7/km^{2}). The racial makeup of the city was 98.1% White, 0.2% African American, 0.1% Native American, 0.3% Asian, 0.6% from other races, and 0.7% from two or more races. Hispanic or Latino of any race were 1.3% of the population.

There were 1,614 households, of which 26.0% had children under the age of 18 living with them, 47.1% were married couples living together, 8.9% had a female householder with no husband present, 3.2% had a male householder with no wife present, and 40.9% were non-families. 36.7% of all households were made up of individuals, and 21% had someone living alone who was 65 years of age or older. The average household size was 2.16 and the average family size was 2.81.

The median age in the city was 45.2 years. 22.5% of residents were under the age of 18; 6.7% were between the ages of 18 and 24; 20.4% were from 25 to 44; 24.9% were from 45 to 64; and 25.3% were 65 years of age or older. The gender makeup of the city was 46.5% male and 53.5% female.

=== 2000 census ===
As of the census of 2000, there were 3,451 people, 1,528 households, and 950 families living in the city. The population density was 1,650.8 inhabitants per square mile (637.4/km^{2}). There were 1,624 housing units at an average density of 776.9 per square mile (300.0/km^{2}). The racial makeup of the city was 99.16% White, 0.17% African American, 0.09% Native American, 0.12% Asian, 0.17% from other races, and 0.29% from two or more races. Hispanic or Latino of any race were 0.72% of the population.

There were 1,528 households, out of which 26.1% had children under the age of 18 living with them, 51.5% were married couples living together, 7.9% had a female householder with no husband present, and 37.8% were non-families. 34.9% of all households were made up of individuals, and 21.7% had someone living alone who was 65 years of age or older. The average household size was 2.19 and the average family size was 2.81.

Age spread: 22.5% under the age of 18, 6.7% from 18 to 24, 23.1% from 25 to 44, 19.0% from 45 to 64, and 28.7% who were 65 years of age or older. The median age was 43 years. For every 100 females, there were 84.1 males. For every 100 females age 18 and over, there were 79.5 males.

The median income for a household in the city was $30,676, and the median income for a family was $39,856. Males had a median income of $31,488 versus $22,688 for females. The per capita income for the city was $17,366. About 5.5% of families and 7.7% of the population were below the poverty line, including 8.1% of those under age 18 and 9.2% of those age 65 or over.

== History ==
The first plat of the town was started in 1854 by a Dr. Moore and named after his eldest daughter “Cora”, but the name was never recorded. In 1855 a Mr. Gibbs arrived from Massachusetts, representing wealthy capitalists in Massachusetts and Connecticut. He prevailed upon Mr. Orrin Sage, a great banker from Ware, MA to invest in this community, and later Mr. Sage gave $2,000 and 600 acres of land to the Library Building Fund. Because of his benevolence, the town’s name was changed to Osage in his honor.

In the winter of 1855-56, Dr. S. B. Chase of Decorah purchased land in the southwest part of the tract and in the spring of 1856 platted the present City of Osage. He named the east-west streets generally for trees and numbered the north-south streets. He was also responsible for setting out maple trees to line the streets. Even today, Osage is referred to as “the City of Maples”. Dr. Chase built an elaborate residence and office on Free Street in 1869. That house still stands today and is used as apartments. Ten years after Dr. Chase’s death in 1891, Free Street was renamed Chase Street to honor his many contributions to Osage.

Several of the businesses in Osage occupy structures built in the 1870’s. City Hall occupies the former Sage Library Building constructed in 1910 after a $10,000 gift from Andrew Carnegie. The very first library building was built in 1876 one-half block west of the current City Hall/Sage Library building. A Subway sandwich shop occupies the ground floor of the building today and the date of 1876 along with “Sage Library” is seen in the concrete and brick work of the second story. In 2002, a four-block area of Main Street was placed on the National Register of Historic Places. On both sides of Main Street within the district, one to multi-story masonry commercial buildings stand which were constructed in the late nineteenth to early twentieth centuries. (There are a few vacant lots and some newer buildings as a result of demolition and fire.) The Osage Commercial Historic District retains sufficient integrity and reflects how the town of Osage has prospered over the years. Main Street is 100 feet wide and was first paved in 1910. Since that time, it was repaved in 1975 and decorative sidewalks were built and trees planted in street boxes. The Main Street project was named the best municipal paving project in Iowa in 1975 by the Iowa Concrete Paving Association.

== Attractions ==
Cedar River Complex - The Cedar River Complex (CRC) is a community recreation destination that includes an events center, wellness center, museum and auditorium. The CRC offers opportunities to meet, play, learn and enjoy. Located in Mitchell County, Iowa, the Cedar River Complex is a multi-faceted recreation facility which includes an events center, a wellness center, the Mitchell County Historical Museum and an auditorium.

Watts Theatre - The Watts Theatre was opened in 1950 by the Jim Watts family, with a showing of "Dancing in the Dark." The 44 by 132 foot building was designed and built as a state-of-the-art theater and included 580 seats and living quarters upstairs for the Watts family. In 1994 Paul and Gloria Bunge purchased the building (which had been closed and stripped of all its equipment and seating) and restored it to its previous glory, including new heating and air conditioning, new projection equipment and a new sound system. The Bunges widened the aisles, left more room between rows, and installed 364 new seats designed for the building. On June 14, 1994, the theater was reopened, again showing "Dancing in the Dark." The Bunges sold the theatre in 1998 to Robert Williams and his adult children, Bethany Jablonski, Ryan Williams, and Steve Williams. The Williams family made several improvements to the theatre, including a new roof, a replacement neon system, equipment upgrades, and a complete refurbishing of the apartment (which is now used as a viewing room and party facility). In October 2006, the Williams family sold the theatre to the Walk Family.

Spring Park - Spring Park has been a destination park for the area dating back to 1894. Originally a private park along the Cedar River, the property was deeded to the City of Osage in 1938. Best known for its encased spring, the park is used as a picnic, playground, and popular primitive camping area. The spring's water is tested frequently and is potable. Woodland flowers cover the grounds in the spring. The 2-mile Harry Cook Nature Trail runs from the west side of Osage to Spring Park, and most of the route runs adjacent to the Cedar River. Fishing and kayaking are also popular sports at Spring Park. Spring Park is located two miles west of Osage on Highway 9 to Spring Park Road, then half mile south.

== Education ==
The Osage Community School District operates area public schools.

The community formerly had Sacred Heart School, of the Roman Catholic Archdiocese of Dubuque, which opened in 1957. By 2012 it had 44 students due to consistent decreases in the student count. The school closed in 2012.

== Notable people ==
- Margaret Stoughton Abell (1908–2004), birthplace of first woman research forester.
- James Vincent Casey, Roman Catholic bishop
- Steve Darrell (1904–1970), actor
- Randy Duncan, football quarterback, Big Ten most valuable player and Heisman Trophy runner-up
- Hamlin Garland, novelist, poet, essayist, short story writer, Georgist, and psychical researcher
- Edward Dean Jeffries, custom vehicle designer, stunt man and stunt coordinator
- Mike Johanns, former Governor of Nebraska, United States Secretary of Agriculture and US Senator from Nebraska
- Alan Larson (born 1949), diplomat and ambassador
- Gerald Leeman, 1948 Olympic silver medallist in freestyle wrestling and 1946 NCAA wrestling champion
- Troy Merritt, PGA Tour golfer
- Tiny Sandford, actor known for appearing in Charlie Chaplin and Laurel and Hardy films
- Doug Schwab, 2008 Olympic wrestler
- Victor Skinner (1882–1960), State representative

== See also ==
- Fox River Mills
