= KSMA-FM =

- Osage, Iowa; United States
- Broadcast area: Mason City–Clear Lake; Austin–Albert Lea
- Frequency: 98.7 MHz
- Branding: 98-7 Kiss Country

Programming
- Format: Country music

Ownership
- Owner: Coloff Media; (Coloff Media, LLC)
- Sister stations: KCFI, KCNZ, KCVM, KHAM, KIOW, KLKK, KMCH-FM, KMAQ-FM

History
- First air date: July 9, 1980
- Former call signs: KOSG (1979–1989); KCZY (1989–1998); KWMM (1998–2001)
- Former frequencies: 92.7 MHz (1980–1993); 103.7 MHz (1993–1999)

Technical information
- Licensing authority: FCC
- Facility ID: 41099
- Class: C3
- ERP: 25,000 watts
- HAAT: 100 meters (330 ft)
- Transmitter coordinates: 43°21′53″N 93°02′54″W

Links
- Public license information: Public file; LMS
- Webcast: Listen live
- Website: 987kisscountry.com

KSMA-FM is a radio station airing a country music format licensed to Osage, Iowa, broadcasting on 98.7 FM. The station serves the areas of Mason City, Iowa, and Austin, Minnesota, and is owned by North Iowa Broadcasting.

KSMA-FM's studios are located on North Federal Avenue in downtown Mason City, while its transmitter is located near Grafton.

== History ==
A construction permit was issued for a radio station serving Osage in 1979.

On July 9, 1980, the station went on the air on 92.7 FM with an easy listening format under the KOSG call letters. On July 1, 1989, KOSG changed call letters to KCZY. During this time, KCZY was part of the "Super C Network", a four-station simulcast that included KCZQ in Cresco, KCZE in New Hampton, and KCHA-FM in Charles City.

In the fall of 1993, KCZY moved to 103.7 FM. On January 1, 1998, KCZY changed calls to KWMM, and flipped to a nostalgia format as "Memories 103.7." In July 1998, James Ingstad Broadcasting sold the station to Cumulus Broadcasting. In May 1999, the station changed frequencies to 98.7 FM. Clear Channel Communications then bought the station in 2000. For many years, the station exclusively targeted Osage and Mitchell County.

On August 13, 2001, at 7:30 p.m., KWMM flipped to Top 40/CHR as "98.7 Kiss FM". The new format competed against hot adult contemporary-formatted KLSS, which served as the default contemporary hit music station for North Iowa, and Rochester, Minnesota-based KROC-FM, whose signal covers much of the area. The current KSMA-FM call letters were adopted on October 2, 2001.

In February 2002, the station completed an upgrade from 6,000 to 25,000 watts and relocated its transmitter to its current site near Grafton in rural Worth County, substantially improving its signal in Mason City and Clear Lake.

“Kiss FM” was the North Iowa affiliate for Rick Dees in the Morning, which was followed by "Valentine in the Morning"; both syndicated shows were based in Los Angeles. In addition, the station also carried Carson Daly, Open House Party, the Rick Dees Weekly Top 40, American Top 40, and the Pop Culture Countdown. Local hosts during this time included Eric Fleming (who later went to KLSS), Patrick Gwin and Fish & the Freakshow.

In 2007, Clear Channel sold off many of their small market stations, including KSMA-FM and sister stations KGLO, KIAI and KLKK, to Three Eagles Broadcasting. Due to market ownership limits, as Three Eagles already owned KLSS, KRIB, and KYTC, KSMA-FM and KLKK were immediately spun off to Coloff Media, which is based in nearby Forest City, along with their Charles City and New Hampton stations KCHA, KCHA-FM and KCZE. After a weekend of stunting, KSMA-FM flipped to Country as "98.7 Kiss Country" on October 2, 2007.

== Programming ==
KSMA-FM airs a country music format. Weekday programming includes the locally produced Morning Rush with J. Brooks and Lunch with the Legends. Weekend syndicated programming includes The Road, Thunder Road, and American Country Countdown.
