= KLKK =

- Clear Lake, Iowa; United States
- Broadcast area: Clear Lake, Iowa, Mason City, Iowa, Cerro Gordo County, Iowa
- Frequency: 103.7 MHz
- Branding: 103.7 The Fox

Programming
- Format: Classic rock
- Affiliations: Minnesota Vikings

Ownership
- Owner: Coloff Media, LLC; (Coloff Media, LLC)
- Sister stations: KSMA-FM, KIOW, KHAM, KCVM, KCNZ, KCFI, KMCH, KMAQ

History
- First air date: February 11, 1978 (as KZEV at 103.1)
- Former call signs: KZEV (1978–1990)
- Former frequencies: 103.1 MHz (1978-2000)

Technical information
- Licensing authority: FCC
- Facility ID: 30128
- Class: C3
- ERP: 25,000 watts
- HAAT: 100 meters (330 ft)
- Transmitter coordinates: 43°07′15″N 93°11′36″W

Links
- Public license information: Public file; LMS
- Webcast: Listen Live
- Website: 1037thefoxrocks.com

KLKK (103.7 FM, "The Fox") is a classic rock radio station licensed to Clear Lake, Iowa, serving Clear Lake, Mason City and surrounding areas of North Iowa and Southern Minnesota. The station is owned Coloff Media and licensed to Coloff Media, LLC. KLKK's studios are located on North Federal Avenue in downtown Mason City, and its transmitter is located in southern Mason City.

== History ==
The station signed on at 5:30 a.m. on February 11, 1978, as KZEV, broadcasting on 103.1 MHz. KZEV was established by Mad Hatter Broadcasting and operated with 3,000 watts of power. The station aired a rock music format as "Rock 103", which later became "Z103."

KZEV was involved in the revival of the Surf Ballroom's annual commemoration of The Day the Music Died. Station personality Darryl Hensley organized a Buddy Holly tribute concert at the Surf Ballroom in February 1979, timed to coincide with KZEV's first anniversary and the 20th anniversary of the 1959 plane crash that killed Holly, Ritchie Valens, and The Big Bopper. The concert featured performers including Del Shannon, The Drifters, and Wolfman Jack and helped establish what became an annual tribute at the venue.

In 1990, KZEV was sold to Linder Radio Group. On August 1, 1990, the station changed its call sign to KLKK and adopted the "103.1 The Fox" identity while continuing its rock format.

In January 1993, James Ingstad Broadcasting acquired KLKK, making it a sister station to KGLO and KIAI. The stations were subsequently acquired by Cumulus Broadcasting in 1998.

In April 2000, KLKK moved from 103.1 to 103.7 FM, and was upgraded from a Class A facility to Class C3, increasing its effective radiated power to 25,000 watts and relocating its transmitter.

Later in 2000, Clear Channel Communications acquired KLKK as part of its acquisition of the Mason City station group.

In 2007, Clear Channel agreed to sell its Mason City-area stations as part of the company's divestiture of stations in smaller markets. KLKK and KSMA-FM were initially included in a group being acquired by Three Eagles Communications, as well as KGLO. Because Three Eagles already owned KLSS, KYTC and KRIB, KLKK and KSMA-FM were instead sold to Forest City-based Coloff Media. The transaction also included Coloff's acquisition of KCHA (AM), KCHA-FM, and KCZE in northeastern Iowa.

Following the 2007 ownership change, KLKK and KSMA-FM moved from the former Clear Channel "Radio Park" facility on South Yorktown Pike in eastern Mason City to studios in downtown Mason City.

== Programming ==
KLKK broadcasts a classic rock format. Current weekday programming includes the syndicated "Dave and Mahoney Show" in mornings and local personality Harry O'Neal. The station also airs syndicated weekend programming including Sammy Hagar's Top Rock Countdown and Alice's Attic with Alice Cooper. KLKK also produces "The Fox 411", a weekly local public-affairs program featuring representatives of area nonprofit organizations. KLKK is an affiliate of the Minnesota Vikings radio network.

For many years, KLKK was the North Iowa affiliate of "The Bob & Tom Show" until September 2025, when they were replaced by the Omaha-based "Todd N Tyler." In June 2026, they were replaced by the Phoenix-based "Dave and Mahoney."

== Technical information ==
KLKK is a Class C3 FM station operating on 103.7 MHz with an effective radiated power (ERP) of 25,000 watts and a height above average terrain (HAAT) of 100 meters (328 ft). Its transmitter is located on 34th Street Southeast in southern Mason City. The station's Federal Communications Commission Facility ID is 30128.
