= KHAM =

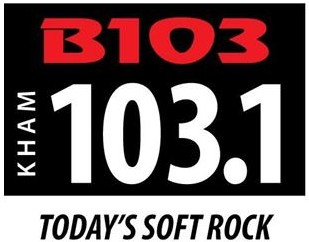
- Britt, Iowa; United States
- Frequency: 103.1 MHz
- Branding: B 103

Programming
- Format: Hot adult contemporary
- Affiliations: ABC News Radio

Ownership
- Owner: Coloff Media; (Coloff Media, LLC)
- Sister stations: KLKK, KSMA-FM, KIOW, KCVM, KCNZ, KCFI, KMCH, KMAQ, KMAQ-FM

History
- First air date: 2006 (at 99.5)
- Former frequencies: 99.5 MHz (2006–2013)

Technical information
- Licensing authority: FCC
- Facility ID: 85062
- Class: C3
- ERP: 10,000 watts
- HAAT: 72.2 m (237 ft)
- Transmitter coordinates: 43°05′47″N 93°48′05″W

Links
- Public license information: Public file; LMS
- Webcast: Listen Live
- Website: b1031.com

KHAM (103.1 FM) is a commercial radio station that is licensed to serve Britt, Iowa. Branded as "B 103", the station airs a hot adult contemporary format and is owned by Coloff Media, LLC.

KHAM was authorized in 2002 and began broadcasting on 99.5 MHz in 2006. Coloff Media acquired the station in 2007, and KHAM moved to its present 103.1 MHz frequency in 2013. The station operates with an effective radiated power of 10 kilowatts as a Class C3 facility.

== History ==
The station originated with a construction permit for a new FM station at 99.5 MHz in Britt. The permit was held by Lyle R. Evans, and the KHAM call sign was assigned on October 18, 2002. The original facility was authorized for 6,000 watts with an antenna height above average terrain of 77 meters from a site near Wesley.

As the construction permit approached expiration in 2005, Evans applied for a smaller facility in Britt operating with 200 watts at 16 meters HAAT. The reduced facility allowed construction of the station to be completed before expiration of the permit. KHAM received its license to cover in February 2006 and began broadcasting on 99.5 MHz.

Evans died in March 2006. His estate subsequently agreed to sell KHAM to Coloff Media, LLC for $10,000, with the transaction announced in 2007.

Under Coloff ownership, KHAM later sought improved facilities. The station moved from 99.5 to 103.1 MHz in 2013. Shortly after the frequency change, Coloff Media applied to upgrade KHAM to a Class C3 facility operating with 19,000 watts at 115 meters HAAT from a tower east of Kanawha, which would have expanded the station's coverage between Mason City and Fort Dodge.

The 19,000 watt facility was not ultimately constructed as proposed. A later construction permit authorized KHAM to operate as a Class C3 station with 10,000 watts at 72.2 meters HAAT. The upgraded facility was licensed in 2023.

== Programming ==
KHAM airs a hot adult contemporary format under the "B 103" branding, with music from the 1990s, 2000s, 2010s and current releases. The station also carries local news, weather and community information, and is affiliated with ABC News Radio.

KHAM is an affiliate of the Northern Iowa Panthers radio network, carrying UNI football and men's basketball. The station also carries Waldorf University athletics.
