= KCNZ (AM) =

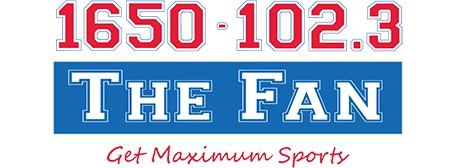
- Cedar Falls, Iowa; United States
- Broadcast area: Waterloo, Iowa
- Frequency: 1650 kHz
- Branding: 1650 & 102.3 The Fan

Programming
- Format: Sports radio
- Affiliations: Westwood One Sports; Fox Sports Radio; Chicago Cubs Radio Network; Iowa State Cyclones; NFL on Westwood One Sports; Waterloo Black Hawks

Ownership
- Owner: James Coloff; (Coloff Media, LLC)
- Sister stations: KCFI; KCHA; KCHA-FM; KCVM; KCZE; KHAM; KIOW; KLKK-FM; KMCH; KSMA-FM

History
- First air date: November 20, 1998; 27 years ago
- Former call signs: KDNZ (1998–2004)

Technical information
- Licensing authority: FCC
- Facility ID: 87158
- Class: B
- Power: 10,000 watts (day); 1,000 watts (night)
- Transmitter coordinates: 42°24′47″N 92°26′15″W
- Translator: 102.3 K272GA (Waterloo)

Links
- Public license information: Public file; LMS
- Webcast: Listen Live
- Website: 1650thefan.com

KCNZ (1650 kHz) is a commercial AM radio station licensed to serve the community of Cedar Falls, Iowa. The station primarily broadcasts a sports radio format. KCNZ is owned by James Coloff, through licensee Coloff Media, LLC, and is an affiliate of Fox Sports Radio. KCNZ carries The Dan Patrick Show and The Jim Rome Show. Play by play on the station includes the Chicago Cubs, Iowa State University football and basketball, the NFL from Westwood One, Waterloo Black Hawks hockey, Waterloo Bucks baseball, and Cedar Falls High School football and basketball. In the event of scheduling conflicts, some events are moved to sister station KCFI.

== History ==
KCNZ originated as the expanded band "twin" of an existing station on the standard AM band. On March 17, 1997, the Federal Communications Commission (FCC) announced that eighty-eight stations had been given permission to move to newly available "Expanded Band" transmitting frequencies, ranging from 1610 to 1700 kHz, with KCNZ (now KCFI) in Cedar Rapids authorized to move from 1250 to 1650 kHz.

A construction permit for the new station on 1650 kHz, also located in Cedar Falls, was issued the call sign KDNZ on August 3, 1998. The FCC's initial policy was that both the original station and its expanded band counterpart could operate simultaneously for up to five years, after which owners would have to turn in one of the two licenses, depending on whether they preferred the new assignment or elected to remain on the original frequency. However, this deadline has been extended multiple times, and both stations have remained authorized. One restriction is that the FCC has generally required paired original and expanded band stations to remain under common ownership.

On March 31, 2004, the two stations swapped callsigns, with KCNZ moving from 1250 AM to 1650 AM, and KDNZ transferred to 1250 AM from 1650 AM. On May 24, 2012, 1250 AM went back to its original call sign of KCFI.
