= KCFI =

- Cedar Falls, Iowa; United States
- Broadcast area: Waterloo, Iowa
- Frequency: 1250 kHz
- Branding: Cruisin' 1250 & 105.1

Programming
- Format: Oldies
- Affiliations: ABC News Radio

Ownership
- Owner: Coloff Media; (Coloff Media, LLC)
- Sister stations: KLKK, KSMA-FM, KIOW, KCVM, KCNZ, KMCH, KMAQ, KMAQ-FM

History
- First air date: July 13, 1960
- Former call signs: KCFI (1960–1995); KCNZ (1995–2004); KDNZ (2004–2012)
- Call sign meaning: Cedar Falls, Iowa

Technical information
- Licensing authority: FCC
- Facility ID: 9726
- Class: B
- Power: 500 watts
- Transmitter coordinates: 42°32′39″N 92°29′17″W
- Translators: 101.5 K268DT (Cedar Falls); 105.1 K286CI (Waterloo)

Links
- Public license information: Public file; LMS
- Webcast: Listen Live
- Website: kcfiradio.com

KCFI (1250 AM) is a commercial radio station licensed to Cedar Falls, Iowa, serving the Waterloo-Cedar Falls area. Branded as "Cruisin' 1250 & 105.1", the station broadcasts an oldies format and is owned by Coloff Media, LLC. KCFI's programming is also heard on FM translators at 101.5 and 105.1 MHz.

KCFI operates with 500 watts on 1250 kHz. During daylight hours, the station used two towers in a directional array that concentrates its signal southeast towards Cedar Rapids. At night, three towers are used to produce a three-lobe directional pattern favoring the south and west.

The station traces its origins to a construction permit issues in 1957 and was licensed on July 13, 1960. KCFI later became the originating station for an AM expanded band authorization on 1650 kHz, which developed later into sister station KCNZ.

== History ==
=== Early years ===
KCFI originated with an application by Jane A. Roberts for a new AM station in Cedar Falls. The Federal Communications Commission granted Roberts a construction permit on March 20, 1957. The permit called for the station to operate on 1250 kHz with 500 watts and specified November 20, 1957, as the deadline for completing construction.

Roberts did not complete construction by the deadline and the permit expired. Mass Communicators, Inc. subsequently applied for the same facilities, while Roberts applied for a replacement permit. The competing applications led to litigation over whether the FCC was required to hold a comparative hearing. In 1959, the United States Court of Appeals for the District of Columbia Circuit ruled in "Mass Communicators, Inc. v. Federal Communications Commission" that the competing applications were mutually exclusive and remanded the case to the FCC for further proceedings.

KCFI was ultimately licensed to Roverts on July 13, 1960 operating on 1250 kHz with 500 watts. Roberts was the station's original owner.

=== Ownership changes ===
By the early 1990s, KCFI was owned by Cedar Valley Broadcasting, Inc. In 1992, Cedar Valley Broadcasting acquired the station from receiver Larry W. Edwards for $275,000. By 1994, KCFI was programming a contemporary country format.

In 1995, Cedar Valley Broadcasting agreed to sell KCFI and a construction permit for an FM station in the Waterloo market to Fife Communications Company, L.C. owned by Anthony, Susan and James Coloff, for $100,000. The station's call sign was changed from KCFI to KCNZ on June 16, 1995.

=== Expanded Band assignment ===
On March 17, 1997, the FCC announced that 88 stations had been authorized to move to newly available "Expanded Band" frequencies between 1610 to 1700 kHz. KCNZ was authorized to move from 1250 to 1650 kHz.

A construction permit for the new 1650 kHz station in Cedar Falls was issued the call sign KDNZ on August 3, 1998. Under the FCC's original Expanded Band policy, the existing station and its expanded band counterpart could operate simultaneously for up to five years, after which one of the two licenses was expected to be surrendered. The deadline was subsequently extended, allowing both stations to remain authorized. One restriction is that the FCC has generally required paired original and expanded band stations to remain under common ownership.

On March 31, 2004, the two stations exchanged call signs: KCNZ moved from 1250 to 1650 kHz, while KDNZ moved from 1650 to 1250 kHz.

=== Later history ===
On May 24, 2012, the 1250 AM station changed its call sign from KDNZ back to its original KCFI call sign.

KCFI's oldies programming was later added to FM translator K286CI at 105.1 MHz, providing an FM simulcast in the Waterloo-Cedar Falls area. In 2022, Coloff Media launched K268DT at 101.5 MHz in Cedar Falls as a new translator for KCFI. K286CI changed its primary programming source to an HD subchannel of sister station KCVM, although it continued relaying KCFI programming, and KCFI has continued to market itself as "Cruisin' 1250 & 105.1".

In 2016, the FCC approved the assignment of KCFI and sister station KCNZ from Fife Communications Company, LLC to Coloff Media, LLC. Control of Coloff Media was subsequently transferred from Anthony and Susan Coloff to James A. Coloff in 2017.

== Programming ==
KCFI broadcasts an oldies format promoted as "The Cedar Valley's Real Oldies". Its weekday lineup include Scott Fenzloff in the mornings, Kelly Neff in the middays and Rob Edwards in afternoons. The station also airs local news, weather and community information and carries national news from ABC News Radio.

KCFI provides local sports coverage, including Cedar Falls High School football and basketball. It also serves as an overflow station for sports programming carried by sister station KCNZ when schedule conflicts occur.

Longtime Cedar Valley broadcaster Dolly Fortier was an on-air personality at KCFI until her death in 2023. Fortier, whose broadcasting career in the Cedar Valley spanned more than four decades, was named Iowa Broadcaster of the Year by the Iowa Broadcasters Association in 2016.
