= KCHA =

KCHA may refer to:

- KCHA (AM), a radio station (1580 AM) licensed to Charles City, Iowa, United States
- KCHA-FM, a radio station (95.9 FM) licensed to Charles City, Iowa, United States
- the ICAO code for Chattanooga Metropolitan Airport
