= KDNZ =

KDNZ may refer to:

- KDNZ (FM), a radio station (97.3 FM) licensed to serve Pecos, Texas, United States
- KCFI, a radio station (1250 AM) licensed to serve Cedar Falls, Iowa, United States, which held the call sign KDNZ from 2004 to 2012
- KCNZ (AM), a radio station (1650 AM) licensed to serve Cedar Falls, Iowa, which held the call sign KDNZ from 1998 to 2004
