= KMAQ =

KMAQ may refer to:

- KMAQ (AM), a radio station (1320 kHz) licensed to Maquoketa, Iowa, United States
- KMAQ-FM, a radio station (95.1 MHz) also licensed to Maquoketa, Iowa
