= KYTC =

KYTC may refer to:

- KYTC (FM), a radio station (102.7 FM) licensed to serve Northwood, Iowa, United States
- Kentucky Transportation Cabinet
