= KRNI =

- Mason City, Iowa; United States
- Broadcast area: Northern Iowa
- Frequency: 1010 kHz

Programming
- Format: Public radio
- Network: Iowa Public Radio (News and Information)

Ownership
- Owner: Iowa Public Radio, Inc.

History
- First air date: March 1, 1948
- Former call signs: KSMN (1948–1985); KLSS (1985–1990)

Technical information
- Licensing authority: FCC
- Facility ID: 69035
- Class: D
- Power: 760 watts (day); 16 watts (night)
- Transmitter coordinates: 43°08′31″N 93°06′40″W

Links
- Public license information: Public file; LMS
- Webcast: Listen live
- Website: Iowa Public Radio

KRNI (1010 AM) is a radio station licensed to Mason City, Iowa, United States. The station is owned by Iowa Public Radio, Inc., and carries the network's "News and Information" service.

KRNI was established as KSMN, the second local station in Mason City, in 1948. KSMN provided news and, ultimately, country music until it was switched to a simulcast of KLSS (106.1 FM), the FM station previously started by KSMN, in 1985. When the owners of KLSS-AM-FM acquired another AM station in 1990, this station was divested and donated to the University of Northern Iowa, who converted it into a public radio station as a simulcast of its main station, KUNI. It remained a public radio station after Iowa's state universities merged their radio operations into IPR in 2004.

KRNI operates from a single-tower facility east of Mason City. It operates at 750 watts during the day. Even with its modest power, the region's flat land and near-perfect ground conductivity allow KRNI to provide at least secondary coverage to most of north-central Iowa and parts of southern Minnesota. At night, the station greatly reduces power to 16 watts in order to protect two Canadian clear-channel stations on 1010 AM, CFRB in Toronto and CBR in Calgary, rendering it all but unlistenable even in Mason City.

== History ==
=== Establishment and early years ===
The Mohawk Broadcasting Company, led by Robert Carson, incorporated in 1947 and filed for and received a construction permit from the Federal Communications Commission (FCC) to build a new radio station on 1010 kHz, to operate with 1,000 watts during daytime hours only, on October 30. Building work began before year's end at a former schoolhouse three miles east of town on U.S. Route 18, and KSMN made its debut on March 1 of that year. The call letters were said to stand for "Komplete Sports Music News". The station suffered a devastating fire to its transmitter site, causing $35,000 in damage, on the night of January 29, 1951; the heat was so intense that the keys melted off typewriters and the entire plant was a total loss, though the studios were not, having previously been moved to the Weir building in downtown Mason City. The station was back in service three days later thanks to emergency equipment provided by transmitter manufacturers and other Iowa radio stations.

In 1952, KSMN principals formed the Twin States Television Corporation. The group then filed for channel 3, which had been allotted to Mason City. This application, however, conflicted with one by Mason City station KGLO; Twin States withdrew its application in October 1953, allowing for the construction of KGLO-TV (now KIMT) on the channel.

Mohawk Broadcasting sold KSMN in 1956 to Land o' Corn Broadcasters, owned by Charles V. Warren, for $115,000. Warren then sold the company to Red Blanchard and Harry Campbell in 1959 for $140,000; by this time, KSMN had additional studios in Hampton and Clear Lake. While Blanchard moved to Mason City, he continued to host the weekly WGN Barn Dance show in Chicago, commuting 800 miles round-trip in his own aircraft each week; he noted that it only took him 30 minutes longer to get to the studio in Chicago than it did when he lived in Berwyn, Illinois, a Chicago suburb, and that he had fun making the journey.

=== Talley and Hedberg ownership ===
Blanchard and Campbell sold KSMN to Hayward Talley of Litchfield, Illinois, trading as the North Central Iowa Broadcasting Company, in 1963. The sale was made because of the increasing demands on Blanchard as an entertainer, with more public appearances and a planned color television broadcast of the Barn Dance. An editor's note in the Globe-Gazette newspaper accompanying an editorial written by Blanchard to bid the town farewell noted that he had become "one of Mason City's most popular personalities".

Under Talley, KSMN filed in 1966 to add an FM station; however, it could not build it at its AM transmitter site due to short-spacing to another station in Waterloo. The new station was approved in May 1967 and planned to broadcast KSMN during daytime hours while extending its service at night. KLSS (106.1 FM) debuted on November 1 of that year.

In 1984, Talley sold KSMN and KLSS to Hedberg Broadcasting of Blue Earth, Minnesota. KSMN initially retained its long-running country music format, but on March 4, 1985, this was abandoned and KSMN switched to simulcasting KLSS and its adult contemporary format, also adopting the KLSS call letters.

=== Donation to public radio ===
In 1990, Hedberg Broadcasting reached a deal to buy KRIB (1490 AM) for $250,000. The deal was of special significance to the company, as company founder Paul Hedberg had worked at KRIB as a teenager in the late 1950s. FCC rules of the time did not permit ownership of multiple AM or FM stations in the same area, so KLSS AM had to be divested. It was donated to the University of Northern Iowa, which at the time had been providing a rebroadcast service of KHKE in Cedar Falls in the Mason City area via a low-powered translator. Programming switched to a rebroadcast of KHKE in September 1990.

The transmitter, cited as having 10 years of service life remaining when Hedberg donated the facility to UNI, was replaced in 1999 using federal grant monies.

In 2004, the radio services of the University of Northern Iowa, Iowa State University, and the University of Iowa were amalgamated into Iowa Public Radio. KRNI was switched in 2011 to the all-news service of IPR. Effective June 30, 2022, all three schools' station licenses were transferred to Iowa Public Radio, Inc.
