= KCNZ =

KCNZ may refer to:

- KCNZ (AM), a radio station (1650 AM) licensed to serve Cedar Falls, Iowa, United States
- KCNZ-CD, a low-power television station (channel 21, virtual 28) licensed to serve San Francisco, California, United States
