= KCVM =

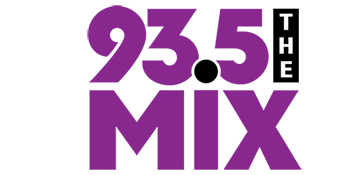
- Evansdale, Iowa; United States
- Broadcast area: Waterloo-Cedar Falls
- Frequency: 93.5 MHz (HD Radio)
- Branding: 93.5 The Mix

Programming
- Format: Hot adult contemporary
- Subchannels: HD2: Country ("Corn Country")

Ownership
- Owner: James Coloff; (Coloff Media, LLC)
- Sister stations: KCNZ, KMCH, KCHA, KCHA-FM, KIOW, KCZE

History
- First air date: August 27, 1997
- Former call signs: KAHG (1994); KZME (1994–1997)
- Former frequencies: 96.1 MHz (1997–2010)
- Call sign meaning: "Cedar Valley Mix"

Technical information
- Licensing authority: FCC
- Facility ID: 17227
- Class: C3
- ERP: 11,000 watts
- HAAT: 71.2 meters (234 ft)
- Transmitter coordinates: 42°24′47″N 92°26′15″W
- Translator: HD2: 106.5 K293CH (Waterloo)

Links
- Public license information: Public file; LMS
- Webcast: Listen live Listen live (HD2)
- Website: 935themix.com; iowacorncountry.com (HD2)

KCVM (93.5 FM) is a commercial radio station located in Cedar Falls, Iowa, United States, serving the Waterloo–Cedar Falls area. The station broadcasts a hot adult contemporary music format. KCVM is licensed to James Coloff's Coloff Media, LLC.

The transmitter and broadcast tower are located northeast of Hudson. According to the Antenna Structure Registration database, the tower is 109 m (358 ft) tall with the FM broadcast antenna mounted at the 104 m (341 ft) level. The calculated height above average terrain is 99 m (325 ft).

== History ==
KCVM was originally broadcast on 96.1 MHz from its inception in 1997 until July 2010. However, due to the need to protect several other stations in nearby markets from interference, the station had broadcast at an effective radiated power of 6 kilowatts with an extremely directional antenna pattern to avoid co-channel interference to stations such as KNWM in Madrid, KQPR in Albert Lea, Minnesota, and KMXG in Clinton. KCVM was also required to protect KCHA-FM (95.9 MHz) in Charles City from adjacent-channel interference.

On June 4, 2010, it was announced that KCVM would be moving from 96.1 to 93.5 and by July 22, KCVM had made the switch to 93.5 MHz; a frequency which allows the station to better serve the Cedar Valley since there are fewer stations on and near the 93.5 frequency that require protection from interference.

=== Signal upgrade application ===
KCVM currently has an application on file with the FCC to upgrade its signal again. This time, the plan is to change the city of license from Hudson to Evansdale, and to upgrade from a Class A license to a Class C3 license, with a boost in power from its current 6 kilowatts up to 24.5 kilowatts, at an antenna height of 81.8 meters. Also, the proposed antenna pattern is non-directional. The new transmitter would be located east of Waterloo and north of Evansdale, on East Big Rock Road between Crane Creek Road and North Raymond Road (County Highway V49) in Black Hawk County. The proposed upgrade would add outlying Cedar Valley communities such as Waverly, Oelwein, and Independence to KCVM's 60 dBu protected/city grade coverage coutour for the first time ever, as those communities have always received anywhere from marginal to poor reception from KCVM, especially on the previous 96.1 frequency (Oelwein and Independence would often receive KMXG in addition to KCVM back when KCVM was on 96.1; especially during times of tropospheric propagation).

== HD Radio and Corn Country ==
Corn country logo

On November 23, 2018, KCVM launched a Christmas music format on its HD2 subchannel, which was relayed on translator K293CH (106.5 FM) in Waterloo. In mid-January 2019, KCVM-HD2 changed to a country music format branded as "Corn Country".

Corn Country broadcasts on KCVM-HD2 and is relayed on K293CH at 106.5 MHz in Waterloo. The service is marketed as "Iowa's Corn Country" and "The Cedar Valley's Best Country". In addition to country music, the service carries local news, weather, agricultural reports and community information. Its weekday programming includes "The Morning Rush" with J Brooks and an afternoon program hosted by Vicki St. James. Corn Country is also available through an online stream.

Corn Country carries Northern Iowa Panthers women's athletics, including women's basketball and volleyball. The sports programming is broadcast on both 106.5 FM and KCVM-HD2.
