= WCCI =

- Savanna, Illinois; United States
- Broadcast area: Northwest Illinois; Clinton, Iowa
- Frequency: 100.3 MHz

Programming
- Format: Country
- Affiliations: NBC News Radio; Clinton LumberKings

Ownership
- Owner: Carroll County Communications, Inc.

History
- First air date: 1971

Technical information
- Licensing authority: FCC
- Facility ID: 9119
- Class: B
- ERP: 25,000 watts
- HAAT: 157 meters (515 ft)
- Transmitter coordinates: 42.130°N 90.140°W

Links
- Public license information: Public file; LMS
- Webcast: Listen live
- Website: wcciradio.com

WCCI (100.3 FM) is a radio station licensed to Savanna, Illinois, and serving Northwest Illinois and Eastern Iowa. WCCI has a country music format and is owned by Carroll County Communications.

== History ==
WCCI was founded by Dennis Voy, who began his radio career at KMAQ in Maquoketa, Iowa, in 1958, when that station signed on for the first time. Voy later purchased that station in 1965 and formed Carroll County Broadcasting Company with Randy C. Smith in 1970 with the intent of putting this station on the air.

WCCI's construction permit was first granted on December 12, 1970, to operate at 100.1 MHz with an effective radiated power of 3,000 watts. Studios were located at 316 Main Street in Savanna.

Voy sold the station in May 1976 to Carroll County Communications, Inc. This entity still controls the station today.

WCCI moved to its current frequency of 100.3 MHz in 1990 in order to increase its power to its current level.
