= The Weekly Pop 20 =

The Weekly Pop 20 with Ann Duran was a nationally syndicated two-hour weekend radio show, playing the best adult pop hits of the 1980s, 1990s, and now - which ran from 2009 to late 2011. The show was designed for the "Gen-X" listener, targeting AC, HAC, Classic Hits and Variety Hits formats with a target demographic of 25-54. The show is hosted by Ann Duran, a radio veteran. The show was created by longtime radio programmer Peter Jackson Oleshchuk and Casey Mac, in February 2009. The Weekly Pop 20 was heard in nearly 40 radio markets throughout the United States and Canada. The show was distributed in partnership by Prairie Radio, LLC and CjM Productions, LLC with United Stations Radio Networks (USRN) selling advertising.

== Staff ==
Host: Ann Duran
Executive Producer / Co-Creator: Peter Jackson Oleshchuk
Production / Co-Creator: Casey Mac
Production / VO: Paul Kraimer

== Features ==
· Number One Songs Of Generation X – 80s, 90s, 00s
· 70s Time Machine Classics
· Then And Now – Remakes and their originals back to back.
· Soundtrack Flashback (songs from those super big hit movies from the 80s and 90s).
· Today’s Top 5.
· Where Are They Now?
· TV Trivia.
· Where Were You When… – Timeline Feature.

== Affiliates ==
WAOL/WOXY-FM Cincinnati, Ohio Saturday 10 am – noon Eastern

KGY-FM Seattle, Washington Sunday 3–5 pm Pacific

KCVM-FM Cedar Valley, Iowa Sunday 10 am – noon Central

WWDW-FM Alberta, Virginia Saturday 10 am – noon Eastern

KIQX-FM Durango, Colorado Sunday 1–3 pm Mountain

CIFX-FM Lewisporte, NF Sunday 1–3 pm Newfoundland

KBYB-FM Texarkana, Texas Saturday 9–11 am Central

KCHX-FM Midland-Odessa, Texas Saturday 6–8 pm Central

KATF-FM Dubuque, Iowa Sunday 10 am – noon Central

KZMI-FM Saipan, Northern Mariana Islands Saturday noon – 2 pm North Mairiana Islands

WCFR-FM Springfield, Vermont Saturday noon – 2 pm Eastern

WCFR-AM Springfield, Vermont Saturday noon – 2 pm Eastern

WRIL-FM Pineville, Kentucky Sunday 6–8 pm Eastern

KSJZ-FM Jamestown, North Dakota Saturday noon – 2 pm Central

KXRV-FM Bismarck, North Dakota Saturday 9–11 am & Sunday 7–9 pm Central

KMCH-FM Manchester, Iowa Sunday 6–8 pm Central

KFML-FM Little Falls, Minnesota Saturday 6–8 pm Central

KLTF-AM Little Falls, Minnesota Sunday 10 pm – 12 am Central

KLTF-FM Little Falls, Minnesota Sunday 10 pm – 12 am Central

WZEB-FM Ocean View, Delaware Saturday 8–10 am Eastern

KWFB-FM Wichita Falls, Texas Sunday 7–9 pm Central

WKPO-FM Viroqua, Wisconsin Saturday 6-8 Central

KRPX-FM Price, Utah Saturday 8–10 am Mountain

WKQW-FM Oil City, Pennsylvania Sunday 2–4 pm Eastern

KGKS-FM Cape Girardeau, Missouri Sunday 10 am – noon Eastern

KHLN-FM Montana City, Montana Sunday 10 am – noon Eastern

KNBZ-FM Aberdeen, South Dakota Sunday noon – 2 pm Eastern

WKVI-FM Knox, Indiana Saturday 6 pm – 8 pm & Sunday noon – 2 pm Eastern

KEXL-FM Norfolk, Nebraska Saturday 6–8 pm & Sunday 12–2 pm Central

WCQL-FM Glen Falls, New York Sunday 7–9 pm Eastern

WKLB-FM / AM Manchester, Kentucky

WMVA Martinsville, Virginia 2–4 pm Eastern

KORC-FM Burns, Oregon Sat 10 am – noon, Sun 4 pm – 6 pm Pacific
