= KIAI =

Radio station in Mason City, Iowa

- Mason City, Iowa; United States
- Broadcast area: Mason City, Iowa micropolitan area
- Frequency: 93.9 MHz
- Branding: 93.9 The Country Moose

Programming
- Language: English
- Format: Country music

Ownership
- Owner: Connoisseur Media; (Alpha 3E Licensee LLC)
- Sister stations: KGLO; KLSS-FM; KRIB; KYTC

History
- First air date: 1985
- Former call signs: KNIQ (1985–1991)
- Former frequencies: 93.5 MHz (1985-1991)
- Call sign meaning: Iowa

Technical information
- Licensing authority: FCC
- Facility ID: 30115
- Class: C1
- ERP: 100,000 watts
- HAAT: 241 m (791 ft)
- Transmitter coordinates: 43°10′5.6″N 93°6′3.9″W

Links
- Public license information: Public file; LMS
- Webcast: Listen live
- Website: www.939kia.com

KIAI (93.9 FM) is a commercial radio station that serves the Mason City, Iowa micropolitan area. The station is owned by Connoisseur Media, through licensee Alpha 3E Licensee LLC, and broadcasts a country music format. KIAI's studios are located on Yorktown Pike in eastern Mason City.

The station's transmitter and broadcast tower are located four miles east of Mason City along 280th Street in rural Cerro Gordo County. According to the Antenna Structure Registration database, the tower is 244 m (801 ft) tall with the FM broadcast antenna mounted at the 229 m (751 ft) level. The calculated Height Above Average Terrain is 241 m (791 ft).

== History ==
B-Y Communications, the owner of KGLO (1300 AM), received approval for a construction permit for an FM station on 93.5 MHz in December 1984. The station received the KNIQ call letters on April 9, 1985. When KNIQ signed on in November 1985, it aired a Top 40/CHR format as "Q93." KNIQ was sold to James Ingstad Broadcasting in March 1990. In September 1991, the station flipped to its current country format as "The Country Moose." On October 4, 1991, KNIQ changed callsigns to KIAI, and on October 14, moved to its current 93.9 FM frequency as part of a coordinated move with KRNA in Iowa City, which subsequently moved to 94.1 FM.

Former logo

James Ingstad Broadcasting sold KIAI to Cumulus Broadcasting in 1998. Two years later, Clear Channel Communications bought the station. In 2007, Clear Channel sold the station to Three Eagles Broadcasting. In 2014, KIAI was sold to Digity, LLC. Two years later, Alpha Media acquired Digity, LLC, including KIAI, for $264 million.

In May 2024, morning show host Britt Bailey was let go from the station due to nationwide staffing cuts initiated by Alpha Media. In addition, other on-air staff were relegated to off-air roles, and the station went jockless. On June 5, KIAI began airing programming from Westwood One's "Mainstream Country" format. KIAI was the North Iowa affiliate of "The Big Time" with Whitney Allen that aired in evenings, "After Midnite" with Granger Smith, Z-Max Racing Country on Sunday mornings, and Country Top 40 with Fitz on Sunday evenings. All of the aforementioned shows were dropped when the station switched to Westwood One programming.

In May 2025, Connoisseur Media announced its intent to acquire Alpha Media. The FCC approved the sale on August 13, 2025, and the sale was consummated on September 4.

On May 20, 2026, KIAI dropped Westwood One programming and returned to a locally originating country format. Mornings are locally hosted by Molly Penny, while Brandon (based at Tyler, Texas sister station KYKX) and Coryelle (based at Lincoln, Nebraska sister station KZKX) host middays and afternoons, respectively. In addition, the syndicated "B-Dub Radio" was added for evenings, as well as "She's Country", a programming featuring female country artists and acts, foe Sunday evenings.
