= KRIB =

Radio station in Mason City, Iowa

- Mason City, Iowa; United States
- Frequency: 1490 kHz C-QUAM AM stereo
- Branding: AM 1490 & 96.7 FM KRIB

Programming
- Format: Soft oldies; adult standards
- Affiliations: AP News; Westwood One

Ownership
- Owner: Connoisseur Media; (Alpha 3E Licensee LLC)
- Sister stations: KGLO; KIAI; KLSS-FM; KYTC

History
- First air date: April 1948; 78 years ago
- Former call signs: KICM (1948–1950)

Technical information
- Licensing authority: FCC
- Facility ID: 47095
- Class: C
- Power: 1,000 watts unlimited
- Transmitter coordinates: 43°8′5.9″N 93°12′28.7″W
- Translator: 96.7 K244FA (Mason City)

Links
- Public license information: Public file; LMS
- Webcast: Listen live; Listen live (via iHeartRadio)
- Website: kribam.com

KRIB (1490 AM) is a commercial radio station licensed to Mason City, Iowa. It is owned by Connoisseur Media and airs a soft oldies and adult standards radio format. The radio studios and offices are on South Yorktown Pike in eastern Mason City.

KRIB is a Class C AM station, powered at 1,000 watts. It uses a non-directional antenna. The transmitter is located behind its former studios on 19th Street Southwest, near Monroe Avenue, in Mason City. Programming is also heard on 250-watt FM translator K244FA at 96.7 MHz, with a transmitter located atop the Cartersville Grain Elevator on South Eisenhower Avenue, also in Mason City.

== History ==
The station signed on the air in April 1948. It was assigned the KRIB call sign by the Federal Communications Commission.

Former logo

Through the 1960s, 1970s and early 1980s, KRIB was the dominant Top 40 station for the Mason City market. This lasted until 1985, when the station made the transition to full-service adult contemporary, competing against AC stations KLSS-FM and KGLO. This did not last long, and in May 1987, after being sold to Boyd Communications, KRIB flipped its format to oldies. However, in 1989, prior owners Chesterman Company regained control of the station after suing Boyd for failing to make payments beyond the initial down payment to purchase the station. In April 1990, Hedberg Broadcasting, the owner of KLSS and KLSS-FM, bought the station, with KLSS AM being subsequently sold to the University of Northern Iowa. In the early 1990s, KRIB began playing a mix of soft oldies and adult standards, using the syndicated service "America's Best Music" supplied by Westwood One for a time, before it was dropped in favor of local programming. In addition, ESPN Radio programming would later be added in evenings for a time.

In March 1997, Three Eagles Broadcasting bought the station. On September 6, 2004, KRIB flipped to country as "Eagle Country", though the prior standards format would continue to be heard in overnights for a brief time. On April 1, 2005, KRIB's country format would move to sister station KYTC; subsequently, KYTC's oldies format would move to KRIB, and became an affiliate of Westwood One's "Good Time Oldies" format for a few years before returning to be locally programmed.

On February 3, 2012, KRIB shifted to adult standards, initially carrying programming from the syndicated "Music of Your Life" service. The station later reverted to being locally programmed, and shifted back to a soft oldies format.

Digity, LLC purchased the station on September 12, 2014. Two years later, Alpha Media acquired Digity, LLC, including KRIB, for $264 million.

In June 2024, due to staffing cuts across many of Alpha Media's stations nationwide, which included the dismissal of operations manager and program director Jared Allen, KRIB returned to airing Westwood One's "Good Time Oldies" format. With the discontinuation of Good Time Oldies by Westwood One on April 20, 2025, KRIB switched back to a mix of soft oldies and adult standards under Westwood One's "Adult Standards" format.

In May 2025, Connoisseur Media announced its intent to acquire Alpha Media. The FCC approved the sale on August 13, 2025, and the sale was consummated on September 4.

=== The Winter Dance Party ===
KRIB was one of the first radio stations in Iowa to play Rock and Roll and Top 40 hits, thus attracting a young audience. In February 1959, the station was one of the sponsors of the Winter Dance Party at the Surf Ballroom in nearby Clear Lake. The show's master of ceremonies was KRIB disc jockey Bob Hale. The show featured The Big Bopper, Ritchie Valens, and Buddy Holly. All three were killed in a plane crash just north of the Mason City Municipal Airport that night. The event would later be described as "The Day the Music Died."

Over sixty years later, KRIB still changes its music format during the week of the anniversary of the Winter Dance Party, playing hit songs of the late 1950s and early 1960s, with an emphasis on tunes from February 1959. On Saturday mornings, it also airs an hour of oldies from the 1960s.
