= KLSS-FM =

Radio station in Mason City, Iowa

- Mason City, Iowa; United States
- Broadcast area: Mason City metropolitan area
- Frequency: 106.1 MHz
- Branding: Star 106

Programming
- Language: English
- Format: Hot adult contemporary
- Affiliations: Premiere Networks

Ownership
- Owner: Connoisseur Media; (Alpha 3E License, LLC)
- Sister stations: KRIB; KIAI; KYTC; KGLO

History
- First air date: November 1, 1967
- Former call signs: KLSS (1967–1985)

Technical information
- Licensing authority: FCC
- Facility ID: 47094
- Class: C1
- ERP: 100,000 watts
- HAAT: 96 meters (315 ft)
- Transmitter coordinates: 43°8′30.9″N 93°6′40.7″W

Links
- Public license information: Public file; LMS
- Webcast: Listen live
- Website: www.mystar106.com

KLSS-FM (106.1 MHz) is a radio station in North Central Iowa airing a hot adult contemporary format. The station is licensed to Mason City, Iowa, and is owned by Connoisseur Media. Its studios are located on Yorktown Pike in east Mason City, and its transmitter is located on East 260th Street, just outside the Mason City city limits.

== History ==
The concept for KLSS-FM was an idea of country music station KSMN owner Hayward Talley, who filed an application with the Federal Communications Commission to add an FM station in 1966; however, it could not build it at its AM transmitter site due to short-spacing to another station in Waterloo. The new station was approved in May 1967 and planned to broadcast KSMN during daytime hours while extending its service at night. KLSS officially debuted on November 1, 1967, with an easy listening format.

In 1984, Talley sold KSMN and KLSS to Hedberg Broadcasting of Blue Earth, Minnesota. KSMN initially retained its country music format, but began simulcasting KLSS full-time (and also adopted the KLSS call letters, with the "-FM" suffix being added to the FM call sign) on March 1, 1985. The two stations simulcast until KLSS (AM) was divested to the University of Northern Iowa and became KRNI in September 1990. This was due to Hedberg reaching a deal to buy KRIB (1490 AM), and FCC rules of the time not allowing ownership of multiple AM or FM stations in the same area.

In March 1997, Three Eagles Broadcasting bought the station. Over time, KLSS would evolve to adult contemporary, and then hot adult contemporary by the 1990s. The current "Star 106" branding was adopted in May 1999.

In 2014, KLSS-FM was sold to Digity, LLC. Two years later, Alpha Media acquired Digity, LLC, including KLSS-FM, for $264 million. By around late 2017 and into early 2018, KLSS evolved to Top 40/CHR, though their playlist was dayparted by featuring more rhythmic songs during the evening and overnight hours. In addition, the station carries the syndicated hot AC version of American Top 40 on Sunday mornings. The station was formerly an affiliate of "Intelligence for Your Life" with John Tesh, "ON with Mario Lopez", and Backtrax USA (the 1980s and 1990s versions both aired on Saturday mornings, while only the 1990s version was aired on Sundays).

In May 2024, program director, operations manager and midday host Jared Allen was let go from the station after 18 years due to nationwide staffing cuts initiated by Alpha Media. In addition, morning host Joe Malone and afternoon host Eric Fleming were relegated to primarily off-air roles, and the station went jockless. On June 5, KLSS began airing Westwood One's "Hits Now!" format. With the discontinuation of "Hits Now!" by Westwood One in April 2025, KLSS switched to Westwood One's "Hot AC" format.

In May 2025, Connoisseur Media announced its intent to acquire Alpha Media. The FCC approved the sale on August 13, 2025, and the sale was consummated on September 4.

On April 23, 2026, KLSS dropped Westwood One's "Hot AC" format and returned to a locally originating hot adult contemporary format. KLSS added the syndicated "Anna & Raven" (based at Bridgeport, Connecticut sister station WEZN-FM) for mornings, while new program director Molly Penny hosts middays, and former morning host Joe Malone hosts afternoons (replacing Christina Kay, who is based at Long Island sister station WALK-FM, after just two months). In addition, the syndicated "XYZ with Erik Zachary", which was dropped when the station went to Westwood One programming, returned for evenings. With the change, "Backtrax USA" and "American Top 40" were dropped.

=== Children's Miracle Network Radiothon ===
KLSS hosts the Children's Miracle Network Radiothon each October, which raises money for the Children's Miracle Network and the University Of Iowa Children's Hospital and helps kids and families in need of major medical care.
