= KCHA-FM =

Radio station in Charles City, Iowa

Coordinates: 29.275°N 98.265°W

- Charles City, Iowa; United States
- Broadcast area: Floyd County, Iowa
- Frequency: 95.9 MHz
- Branding: 95-9 KCHA

Programming
- Format: Variety
- Affiliations: ABC News Radio; Compass Media Networks; Radio Iowa; Brownfield Farm Network; Cyclone Radio Network

Ownership
- Owner: Achen Becker Media, LLC
- Sister stations: KCHA (AM); KCZE

History
- First air date: 1971
- Former frequencies: 104.9 MHz (1971–1976)
- Call sign meaning: Charles City

Technical information
- Licensing authority: FCC
- Facility ID: 41100
- Class: A
- ERP: 6,000 watts
- HAAT: 91 meters (299 ft)

Links
- Public license information: Public file; LMS
- Webcast: Listen live
- Website: kchanews.com

KCHA-FM (95.9 MHz) is a full service—formatted radio station in Charles City, Iowa, United States. KCHA-FM is owned and operated by Achen Becker Media, LLC, and operates from studios on Main Street and a transmitter on Stoney Point Road.

== History ==
KCHA-FM was launched in 1971 on 104.9 MHz. The station was required to move to 95.9 in 1976 as a result of a Federal Communications Commission (FCC) docket to allow additional radio stations in the region. In 1980, FCC approval was obtained to raise the KCHA tower from 187 feet (57 m) to 387 feet (118 m) in order to expand the FM station's coverage area.

Luverne Bromberg and family sold the KCHA stations in 1986 to James B. Hebel, a former radio announcer in Chicago. Hebel sold the two outlets, plus KCZE in New Hampton and KCZY in Osage, to the Ingstad family of North Dakota in 1995; these stations and others were then sold to Cumulus Media in 1998 and Clear Channel Communications in 2000. They were bought in 2007 by Three Eagles Communications, which immediately resold five of the stations including KCHA-AM-FM and KCZE to Coloff Media of Cedar Falls.

Achen Becker Media acquired KCHA-AM-FM and KCZE from Coloff Media for $1.15 million in 2026.
