= KGLO =

Radio station in Mason City, Iowa

- Mason City, Iowa; United States
- Frequency: 1300 kHz

Programming
- Language: English
- Format: News/talk
- Affiliations: ABC News Radio; Compass Media Networks; Premiere Networks; Minnesota Twins Radio Network

Ownership
- Owner: Connoisseur Media; (Alpha 3E Licensee LLC)
- Sister stations: KIAI; KLSS-FM; KRIB; KYTC

History
- First air date: January 17, 1937; 89 years ago
- Call sign meaning: Globe Gazette (original owner)

Technical information
- Licensing authority: FCC
- Facility ID: 30114
- Class: B
- Power: 5,000 watts
- Transmitter coordinates: 43°3′12.9″N 93°12′17.7″W

Links
- Public license information: Public file; LMS
- Webcast: Listen live; Listen live (via iHeartRadio)
- Website: www.kgloam.com

KGLO (1300 AM) is a commercial radio station in Mason City, Iowa, owned by Connoisseur Media, through licensee Alpha 3E Licensee LLC. It airs a news/talk radio format. The station's studios and offices are on South Yorktown Pike in eastern Mason City.

KGLO is a Class B AM station, powered at 5,000 watts. It uses a directional antenna with a three-tower array. Its transmitter is on 200th Street near Partridge Avenue (U.S. Route 65), about three miles south of Mason City.

== Programming ==
KGLO's weekday schedule consists of nationally syndicated talk shows: The Ramsey Show with Dave Ramsey, Markley, Van Camp & Robbins, The Sean Hannity Show, Ground Zero with Clyde Lewis and Coast to Coast AM with George Noory.

It also carries Minnesota Twins baseball games. Most hours begin with an update from CBS News Radio.

Former logo

== History ==
=== Globe Gazette newspaper ===
KGLO signed on the air on January 17, 1937, and was the first radio station legally licensed to Mason City. Originally it was assigned the frequency of 1210 kHz. It was owned by Lee Enterprises, which also owned the Globe Gazette. The call sign derives from the daily newspaper's name.

The founding general manager of KGLO and Lee Broadcasting was Francis C. Eighmey. KGLO began operation with only 250 watts of power by day and 100 watts at night. It was the lowest wattage radio station to be an affiliate of the CBS Radio Network, but the station served what was recognized as a key market area in the Midwest.

=== Signal upgrade ===
In the early 1940s, the station moved to its present frequency of 1300 kHz, coupled with a power upgrade. On March 29, 1941, power was increased to 1,000 watts day and night with a non-directional antenna. The transmitter was on old Highway 18 just west of Mason City. Shortly thereafter, power was increased to 5,000 watts and two flanking towers were added to produce a directional signal at night with deep nulls to the east and west. In 1998, the transmitter was moved to six miles south of Mason City with directional pattern both day and night to provide a better signal over Mason City.

The revenue generated by KGLO radio provided for significant corporate expansion. Eighmey began this process with the acquisition of WTAD in Quincy, Illinois. Additional radio stations were later added in Wisconsin. Lee Broadcasting established KGLO-TV, the area's CBS affiliate, in 1954. That station is now KIMT-TV. Other television stations were acquired, including KGMB-TV in Honolulu and KOIN-TV in Portland, Oregon.

=== Full service and news-talk ===
In the 1960s, the Lee Newspapers were merged with Lee Broadcasting, becoming Lee Enterprises. As network programming shifted from radio to television, KGLO began a full service, middle of the road format of popular adult music, news, sports and farm reports.

In August 1977, the Federal Communications Commission (FCC) ruled that one company could not own all the media outlets in a city, forcing Lee Enterprises to break up its cluster in Mason City. As a result, KGLO-TV and KGLO radio were separated with the latter's sale to B-Y Communications.

The station shifted to adult contemporary music in the 1980s. By the 1990s, listeners were tuning to FM radio stations for music, so KGLO made the transition to all-talk with frequent news, sports and farm reports.

James Ingstad Broadcasting bought the station in March 1990. Cumulus Broadcasting bought the station in 1998, then sold it to Clear Channel Communications in 2000.

In 2007, Clear Channel sold the station to Three Eagles Broadcasting. In 2014, KGLO was sold to Digity, LLC. Two years later, Alpha Media acquired Digity, LLC, including KGLO, for $264 million.

Longtime morning show host Tim Fleming, who had been with KGLO since September 1977, was let go from the station in May 2024 due to nationwide staffing cuts initiated by Alpha Media. In addition, longtime news director Bob Fisher was also let go, and Mason City High School sports broadcasts were dropped.

In May 2025, Connoisseur Media announced its intent to acquire Alpha Media. The FCC approved the sale on August 13, 2025, and the sale was consummated on September 4.
