= KCZE =

- New Hampton, Iowa; United States
- Broadcast area: New Hampton, Iowa; Chickasaw County, Iowa
- Frequency: 95.1 MHz
- Branding: 95.1 The Bull

Programming
- Format: Country
- Affiliations: ABC News Radio; Radio Iowa; Brownfield Farm Network; Iowa Hawkeye Radio Network

Ownership
- Owner: Achen Becker Media, LLC
- Sister stations: KCHA-FM, KCHA (AM)

History
- First air date: 1989

Technical information
- Licensing authority: FCC
- Facility ID: 41098
- Class: A
- ERP: 5,500 watts
- HAAT: 103 meters (338 ft)
- Transmitter coordinates: 43°02′46″N 92°18′09″W

Links
- Public license information: Public file; LMS
- Webcast: The Bull Live Stream
- Website: 951thebull.com

KCZE (95.1 FM) is a commercial country radio station licensed to New Hampton, Iowa, serving New Hampton, Chickasaw County, Iowa and surrounding areas of northeastern Iowa. The station broadcasts as "95.1 The Bull," combining country music with local news, weather, sports, agricultural and community programming.

KCZE is owned and operated by Achen Becker Media, LLC. The station is co-owned with KCHA (AM) and KCHA-FM in Charles City, Iowa.

== History ==
=== Early years and Super C ===
KCZE began broadcasting in 1989 on 95.1 MHz. The station was established by broadcaster Jim Hebel as part of Mega Media's group of northeastern Iowa radio stations, which operated as the Super C Radio Network. The group also included KCHA (AM) and KCHA-FM in Charles City and stations serving Cresco and Osage.

KCZE originally operated with an effective radiated power of 3,000 watts. In 1996, Mega Media sold its five-station northeastern Iowa group, including KCZE, to Ingstad Northern Iowa Broadcasting for $1.035 million.

=== Cumulus and Clear Channel ownership ===
KCZE subsequently became part of Cumulus Broadcasting's northern Iowa station group. In 2000, Cumulus Media agreed to sell its Mason City-area stations, including KCZE, to Clear Channel Communications as part of a $75 million transaction involving 30 radio stations in five markets.

During this period, KCZE simulcast KCHA-FM in Charles City. The simulcast had previously included KCZE, KCHA-FM, KCZQ in Cresco and KCZY in Osage.

In December 2002, Clear Channel separated KCZE from the KCHA-FM simulcast and launched a standalone country format as "Chickasaw Country." Programming was initially automated outside of a locally produced morning show airing from 6 to 10 a.m.

In 2005, KCZE dropped the "Chickasaw Country" identity and adopted "The Bull" branding.

=== Coloff Media and Achen Becker Media ===
In 2007, Clear Channel agreed to sell its northern Iowa stations to Three Eagles Communications. Because Three Eagles already owned stations in the Mason City market, KCZE, KCHA (AM), KCHA-FM, KLKK and KSMA-FM were sold off to Coloff Media for $1.725 million. The FCC granted the assignment of KCZE to Coloff Media in July 2007.

In January 2026, Coloff Media agreed to sell KCZE, KCHA (AM), KCHA-FM and FM translator K277DM to Achen Becker Media, LLC for $1.15 million. The Federal Communications Commission approved the assignment of the stations in March 20, 2026, and the sale closed on April 10, 2026.

== Programming ==
KCZE broadcasts a country music format as "95.1 The Bull." Programming combines country music with local and state news, weather, agricultural information, community information and local sports coverage.

The station produces local newscasts covering New Hampton, Chickasaw County and surrounding communities in northeastern Iowa. The Bull newscasts air three times each weekday, at approximately 7:12 a.m., 12:12 p.m. and 5:12 p.m. Other locally oriented programming includes weather information, agricultural and commodity market reports, community information and funeral announcements.

KCZE also carries national news programming from ABC News Radio, along with statewide news and agricultural programming.

=== Sports ===
KCZE carries local high school and college sports programming. The station serves as a radio home for the New Hampton Chickasaws athletics and has carried a variety of high school sports, including football, volleyball, basketball, wrestling, baseball and softball.

KCZE is also an affiliate of the Iowa Hawkeyes radio network and carries University of Iowa athletic programming, including Hawkeyes football and men's basketball.

== Technical information ==
KCZE broadcasts on 95.1 MHz as a Class A FM station. The station operates with an effective radiated power of 5,500 watts and a Height above average terrain of 103 meters.
