= KYTC (FM) =

Radio station in Northwood, Iowa

- Northwood, Iowa; United States
- Broadcast area: Mason City–Austin–Albert Lea
- Frequency: 102.7 MHz
- Branding: Super Hits 102.7

Programming
- Format: Classic hits

Ownership
- Owner: Connoisseur Media; (Alpha 3E Licensee LLC)
- Sister stations: KGLO; KIAI; KLSS-FM; KRIB

History
- First air date: October 15, 1990
- Former call signs: KPLW (1988–1990)

Technical information
- Licensing authority: FCC
- Facility ID: 49798
- Class: C3
- ERP: 25,000 watts
- HAAT: 90 meters (300 ft)
- Transmitter coordinates: 43°29′17.8″N 93°14′12.7″W

Links
- Public license information: Public file; LMS
- Webcast: Listen live
- Website: www.superhits1027.com

KYTC (102.7 MHz, "Super Hits 102.7") is an FM radio station that broadcasts a classic hits music format. Licensed to Northwood, Iowa, it serves northern Iowa and southern Minnesota. The station is owned by Connoisseur Media, through licensee Alpha 3E Licensee LLC. KYTC's studios are located on Yorktown Pike in eastern Mason City, and its transmitter is located on 500th Street, about a mile south of the Iowa-Minnesota state line in Worth County.

== History ==
The station was originally operated by Northwood businessman Marlin Hanson as an oldies radio station with an effective radiated power of 3,000 watts, which was later increased to 6,000 watts. Hanson built the station because he bought the tower from the local cable company after they abandoned it and decided a radio station would be a good use for the empty tower. It was sold to Dave Nolander, who also owned KATE in nearby Albert Lea, Minnesota. When KYTC officially signed on the air on October 15, 1990, it aired an oldies format, featuring music of the 1950s and 1960s. Studios were located in Northwood, and satellite programming was featured during the evening hours. KYTC was sold to Three Eagles Communications in August 1999, with studios then being moved to Mason City. In January 2000, the station's power was upgraded to 25,000 watts.

On April 1, 2005, KYTC's oldies format moved to KRIB; subsequently, KRIB's country format moved to KYTC and rebranded as "Eagle Country KY 102.7". After KIAI became KYTC's sister station as part of Three Eagles' purchase of Clear Channel Communications' Mason City stations, KYTC flipped to active rock as "102.7 The Blaze" on November 12, 2007.

On February 3, 2012, KYTC flipped to classic hits, branded as "Super Hits 102.7".

Digity, LLC purchased the station on September 12, 2014. Two years later, Alpha Media acquired Digity, LLC, including KYTC, for $264 million.

On June 5, 2024, KYTC began airing Westwood One's "Classic Hits" format full-time as a result of staffing cuts initiated across many of Alpha Media's stations nationwide, including the dismissal of operations manager and morning host Jared Allen. In addition, midday host Eric Fleming and afternoon host Joe Malone were reassigned to primarily off-air positions.

In May 2025, Connoisseur Media announced its intent to acquire Alpha Media. The FCC approved the sale on August 13, 2025, and the sale was consummated on September 4.

On May 14, 2026, KYTC dropped Westwood One programming and returned to a locally originating classic hits format. The station added "Intelligence for Your Life" with John Tesh for mornings, while Jon Kamal (based at Bridgeport, Connecticut sister station WPLR) and Iris (based at Amarillo, Texas sister station KVWE) host middays and afternoons, respectively. In addition, the station added "Throwback Nation Radio" with Tony Lorino for weeknights and "Robby's Top 20" with Robby Bridges for Sunday evenings. With the change, American Top 40: The 70s, which aired on Saturday and Sunday mornings, was dropped.
