= KMAQ (AM) =

- Maquoketa, Iowa; United States
- Frequency: 1320 kHz

Programming
- Language: English
- Format: Full service country
- Affiliations: Iowa Agribusiness Radio Network

Ownership
- Owner: Jim Coloff; (Coloff Media)
- Sister stations: KMAQ-FM

History
- Founded: 1958
- First air date: August 26, 1958; 67 years ago
- Call sign meaning: K(MAQuoketa)

Technical information
- Licensing authority: FCC
- Facility ID: 39858
- Class: D
- Power: 500 watts day 135 watts night
- Transmitter coordinates: 42°5′26.1″N 90°37′43.5″W
- Translator: 92.5 K223DA (Bellevue)

Links
- Public license information: Public file; LMS
- Website: kmaq.com

KMAQ is an American radio station, licensed to operate on AM 1320 from Maquoketa, Iowa. KMAQ, and its sister station KMAQ-FM, simulcast each other for about half the broadcast day. KMAQ's studios are downtown at 129 North Main Street. Both share the same transmitter site, northeast of town on 233rd Road.

KMAQ is the area's only locally owned and operated radio station, with no out-of-market consultant or ownership, programmed to the needs of its community. It bears the distinction of being one of a handful of radio stations across the country today with a live, local, real-time on-air staff.

== History ==
KMAQ first went on the air as a standalone AM station on August 26, 1958, from studios located at 136 1/2 South Main Street in Maquoketa. The construction permit for KMAQ was first issued on October 24, 1956, to Jackson County Broadcasting Company, headed by brothers Nathan and Robert Goetz, and their accountant, Merlin Meythaler. Bob Brown was the first general manager of the station; Raymond Shields as chief engineer and farm services director; Stan Barton and Dennis Voy as announcers; Duane Wiley as sales representative; and Gitte Bollinger as secretary and receptionist. Voy was promoted to station manager in 1960 after Wiley (who became station manager in 1959) was injured in an accident.

The station then operated as a strictly sunrise to sunset operation at its current power of 500 watts. It was granted permission in April 1960 to stay on the air past 6p.m. for special events until September of that same year.

On August 2, 1965, Jackson County Broadcasting Company agreed to sell KMAQ to Maquoketa Broadcasting Company, owned by KMAQ manager Dennis Voy, who continues ownership of the station today. Voy, who financed the purchase through a loan from his father, was only 26 at the time. The Goetz brothers would go on to form Goetz Broadcasting Company, which grew to the then-FCC-mandated ownership limit of 12 stations, which stretched from Illinois to Michigan. Nathan Goetz died in 2018 at the age of 92.

In the summer of 1966, KMAQ was granted an FM license to operate on 95.1 (originally 95.3 but was changed due to increased power authorized on 95.1, as at the time all stations on 95.3 were Class A stations limited to 3,000 watts at 300 feet) and signed on the air the following year. In October 1970, following a fire at a neighboring business that caused some damage to studio equipment, KMAQ moved to its current location at 129 North Main Street in Maquoketa.

In 1971, KMAQ gained a sister station in nearby Savanna, Illinois: WCCI. The station was sold to a new owner five years later.

KMAQ thrived over the years due to its heavy community outreach efforts, including milestone celebrations every five years engaging listener involvement, a giveaway of 12 radios during its 50th anniversary celebration, annual summer broadcasts from the Clinton County Fair, and other promotions.

In the summer of 2023, Voy announced plans to sell the station, retire and was scheduled to have his final broadcast that August 25. He had been with the radio station since its beginnings in August 1958, some 65 years earlier. In July 2024, Coloff Media announced the purchase of KMAQ's AM and FM frequencies from Voy. The station vowed to continue coverage of area events and sports and to retain all current employees through its transition in ownership.

== FM translator ==
In October 2018, KMAQ added an FM translator on 92.5MHz (K223DA) to better serve Bellvue residents.

Broadcast translator for KMAQ
Call sign	Frequency	City of license	FID	ERP (W)	HAAT	Class	Transmitter coordinates	FCC info
K223DA	92.5 FM	Bellevue, Iowa	202102	250	0 m (0 ft)	D	42°15′45.4″N 90°25′48.3″W	LMS

== Staff ==
KMAQ has the distinction of having an all-female sales force, with the exception of its sales manager Leighton Hepker, who first joined the station in 1975 as news director, then becoming sales manager and then ascending to station manager in 1981. After 44 years with KMAQ, Hepker died of cancer January 11, 2019.
