= KMAQ-FM =

Coordinates: 42°5′26″N 90°37′43″W

- Maquoketa, Iowa; United States
- Broadcast area: Jackson–Jones County, Iowa
- Frequency: 95.1 MHz

Programming
- Format: Adult contemporary
- Affiliations: ABC News Radio

Ownership
- Owner: Coloff Media

History
- First air date: 1967

Technical information
- Licensing authority: FCC
- Facility ID: 39857
- Class: A
- ERP: 6,000 watts
- HAAT: 100 meters (330 ft)

Links
- Public license information: Public file; LMS
- Website: kmaq.com

KMAQ-FM (95.1 MHz) is an American radio station from Maquoketa, Iowa. KMAQ-FM, and its sister AM station KMAQ, simulcast each other for about half the broadcast day. The KMAQ-FM studios are downtown at 129 North Main Street. Both share the same transmitter site, northeast of town on 233rd Road.

KMAQ-FM was established as an adjunct to KMAQ AM in 1967. It allowed the daytime AM radio station to offer programming at night. The frequencies began broadcasting split music programming in the early 1980s.

== History ==
On August 2, 1965, Jackson County Broadcasting Company agreed to sell KMAQ (AM) to Maquoketa Broadcasting Company, owned by KMAQ manager Dennis Voy, who continued ownership of the station until his retirement in 2024. Voy, who financed the purchase through a loan from his father, was only 26 at the time. The Goetz brothers would go on to form Goetz Broadcasting Company, which grew to the then-FCC-mandated ownership limit of 12 stations, which stretched from Illinois to Michigan. Nathan Goetz died in 2018 at the age of 92.

In the summer of 1966, KMAQ was granted an FM license to operate on 95.3 MHz and signed on the air the following year. The new station allowed KMAQ, a daytime-only AM outlet, to cover sports broadcasts at night. In October 1970, following a fire at a neighboring business that caused some damage to studio equipment, KMAQ moved to its current location at 129 North Main Street in Maquoketa. The station was briefly off the air in 1974 when someone shot at the tower, damaging the transmission line feeding the FM antenna.

In 1971, KMAQ-AM-FM gained a sister station in nearby Savanna, Illinois: WCCI. The station was sold to a new owner five years later.

In the early 1980s, KMAQ split its AM and FM stations to offer separate programming, with country music on AM and adult contemporary music on FM.

In the summer of 2023, Voy announced plans to sell the stations, retire and was scheduled to have his final broadcast that August 25. He had been with the radio station since its beginnings in August 1958, some 65 years earlier. In July 2024, Coloff Media announced the purchase of KMAQ-AM-FM from Voy. The stations vowed to continue coverage of area events and sports and to retain all current employees through its transition in ownership.

In December of 2024, Coloff Media, owned by Jim Coloff, purchased KMAQ.
