= KCHA (AM) =

- Charles City, Iowa; United States
- Broadcast area: Charles City, Iowa and Floyd County, IA
- Frequency: 1580 kHz
- Branding: Fabulous 1580 & 103.3

Programming
- Format: Oldies
- Affiliations: ABC News Radio

Ownership
- Owner: Achen Becker Media, LLC
- Sister stations: KCHA-FM, KCZE

History
- First air date: December 13, 1949

Technical information
- Licensing authority: FCC
- Facility ID: 41102
- Class: D
- Power: 500 watts day; 10 watts night
- Transmitter coordinates: 43°03′05″N 92°40′00″W
- Translator: 103.3 K277DM (Charles City)

Links
- Public license information: Public file; LMS
- Webcast: Listen Live
- Website: kchanews.com

KCHA (1580 AM) is a commercial radio station licensed to Charles City, Iowa, serving Charles City, Floyd County, Iowa, and portions of north-central and northeastern Iowa. The station broadcasts an oldies format and is branded as "Fabulous 1580 & 103.3." KCHA's programming is also rebroadcast on FM translator K277DM (103.3 MHz).

KCHA is owned and operated by Achen Becker Media, LLC. The station began broadcasting in 1949.

== History ==
KCHA began broadcasting in Charles City in 1949 on 1580 kHz. Historical broadcasting directories list the station's studios at 300 1/2 North Main Street in downtown Charles City.

The station originally operated with 250 watts of daytime power. In 1958, the Federal Communications (FCC) approved an increase in KCHA's daytime power from 250 to 500 watts.

== 1968 Charles City tornado ==
KCHA played a role in providing emergency information during the F5 tornado that struck Charles City on May 15, 1958. As the tornado approached the city, KCHA was broadcasting reports about the approaching storm.

KCHA announcer John Phillips was on the air as the tornado approached downtown Charles City. According to a retrospective published by the Charles City Press, Phillips had just reported that a tornado was striking the south side of the city when he saw the tornado from the station's downtown studio. His reaction was heard over the air immediately before the station's signal was lost.

The tornado passed directly through Charles City, damaging approximately 60 percent of the community. Thirteen people were killed and approximately 450 were injured. Hundreds of homes and businesses were destroyed or severely damaged.

The tornado knocked out electrical and communications services throughout the city, including KCHA's downtown facilities. Station personnel subsequently established broadcasting operations at KCHA's transmitter site on Stoney Point Road, using emergency power to return the station to the air. KCHA broadcast information from the transmitter site during the aftermath of the tornado.

Recordings of KCHA's broadcasts following the tornado have been preserved, along with handwritten notes used by station personnel during the station's post-tornado coverage.

== Programming ==
KCHA broadcasts an oldies music format as "Fabulous 1580 & 103.3." In addition to its regular music programming, the station carries local news, weather and sports programming.

KCHA serves as a radio home for Charles City Comets athletics. The station also carries football and men's basketball broadcasts from the University of Northern Iowa Panthers.

The station airs several nationally syndicated oldies programs, including "Greatest Hits USA", "Blue Suede Connection" and "Flower Power Hour".

== FM translator ==
KCHA's programming is simulcast on FM translator K277DM, broadcasting at 103.3 MHz in Charles City. The translator, FCC Facility ID 200184 and extends KCHA's programming to FM listeners in the Charles City area.

The AM station and FM translator are jointly branded as "Fabulous 1580 & 103.3."

== Technical information ==
KCHA broadcasts on 1580 kHz as a Class D AM station. The station operated with 500 watts during daytime hours and reduces power to 10 watts at night to protect other stations operating on 1580 kHz from interference.

KCHA's transmitter is located on Stoney Point Road in Charles City.

The station's AM transmitter site has been associated with KCHA since at least the 1960s and was used as an emergency broadcasting location following the May 15, 1968 tornado.
