= KMCH =

Radio station in Manchester, Iowa

- Manchester, Iowa; United States
- Broadcast area: Manchester, Iowa; Delaware County, Iowa
- Frequency: 94.7 MHz
- Branding: "Mix 94.7 KMCH"

Programming
- Format: Full-service
- Affiliations: ABC Radio News; Hawkeye Radio Network; Iowa Agribusiness Radio Network; KCRG-TV; Radio Iowa

Ownership
- Owner: Delaware County Broadcasting; (Coloff Media, LLC)

History
- First air date: December 5, 1991
- Call sign meaning: K ManCHester

Technical information
- Licensing authority: FCC
- Facility ID: 64125
- Class: A
- ERP: 6,000 watts
- HAAT: 100 m (330 ft)
- Transmitter coordinates: 42°31′42″N 91°22′53″W

Links
- Public license information: Public file; LMS
- Webcast: KMCH Webstream
- Website: KMCH Online

KMCH is a full-service radio station licensed to Manchester, Iowa, serving Manchester and Delaware County. KMCH is owned and operated by Delaware County Broadcasting and broadcasts from a tower in rural Delaware County, east of Manchester.

== History ==
KMCH was launched on December 5, 1991 and is the county's only radio station.

== Programming ==
The station broadcasts a full-service format, with varied music programming including adult contemporary, new country, Classic Country, oldies, classic rock, contemporary Christian, and Top 40 music.

KMCH broadcasts a variety of news content, including national news from CBS News Radio, state news from Radio Iowa, and local news, including agricultural and business news, as well as local weather and sports, plus funeral announcements, health information, and a community calendar. KMCH also broadcasts local religious services and religious programming on Sunday mornings.

Syndicated programming is also heard on KMCH, with the station airing musical shows "Hall of Fame Coast to Coast", "Thunder Road", "Casey Kasem's American Top 40: The 70's", "Acoustic Café", "The Weekly Pop 20", "25 Years of Hits", and "The House of Blues Radio Hour".

The station also airs the syndicated religious programs "The Beacon", "The Lutheran Hour", "Sing for Joy", and "Woman to Woman".
