= KIOW =

- Forest City, Iowa; United States
- Broadcast area: Forest City, Iowa; Mason City, Iowa
- Frequency: 107.3 MHz
- Branding: Mix 107.3

Programming
- Format: Adult Contemporary
- Affiliations: ABC News Radio, Radio Iowa

Ownership
- Owner: Pilot Knob Broadcasting
- Sister stations: KHAM

History
- First air date: November 8, 1978
- Former frequencies: 102.3 MHz (1978–1993)
- Call sign meaning: K IOWa

Technical information
- Licensing authority: FCC
- Facility ID: 52609
- Class: C3
- Power: 25,000 watts
- HAAT: 100 meters (330 ft)
- Transmitter coordinates: 43°17′02″N 93°37′50″W

Links
- Public license information: Public file; LMS
- Webcast: Listen Live
- Website: kiow.com

KIOW (107.3 FM) is a radio station licensed to Forest City, Iowa, serving northern Iowa and southern Minnesota. Branded as "Mix 107.3", the station airs a mix of adult contemporary, oldies, and country music, along with local news, weather, sports, and agricultural programming. KIOW is owned and operated by Pilot Knob Broadcasting, Inc., a subsidiary of the Forest City-based Coloff Media group.

== History ==
In 1977, Pilot Knob Broadcasting filed an application to establish a new FM station in Forest City on 102.3 MHz with 3,000 watts of power. The company's principals were Anthony G. "Tony" Coloff and his wife, Susan I. "Sue" Coloff. At the time, Tony Coloff was program director at KQAD in Luverne, Minnesota, and the proposed Forest City station was to air a beautiful music format.

KIOW began broadcasting on November 8, 1978, on 102.3 MHz. By 1993, the station was operating with 6,000 watts and airing an adult contemporary and oldies format, along with news, farm and country programming. During 1993, KIOW moved from 102.3 to its present 107.3 MHz frequency and increased its effective radiated power to 25,000 watts.

Tony and Sue Coloff continued to own KIOW through Pilot Knob Broadcasting until control of the company was transferred to their son, James A. "Jim" Coloff, in 2017.

== Programming ==
KIOW's programming includes adult contemporary, oldies and country music, along with local news, weather, agricultural information and sports coverage. The station carries national news from ABC News Radio and state news from Radio Iowa. KIOW also broadcasts local high school sports and is an affiliate of the Iowa State Cyclones radio network.
