= Dale (given name) =

- Pronunciation: /ˈdeɪl/
- Gender: Unisex
- Language: English

Origin
- Language: English
- Origin: From an English surname
- Meaning: "dale" or "valley"
- Region of origin: England

Other names
- Variant form: Dayle
- Related names: Dallas, Dell

Dale is a unisex given name of English origin.

== Men with the name ==
- Dale Alexander (1903–1979), American baseball player and manager
- Dale Anderson (disambiguation), Multiple people
- Dale Baum (born 1943), American historian and professor
- Dale Berry (born 1960), American commercial artist and designer
- Dale Brown (disambiguation), Multiple people
- Dale Bumpers (1925–2016), American lawyer and politician
- Dale Campbell-Savours (born 1943), British politician
- Dale Carnegie (1888–1955), motivational speaker and author
- Dale Carr (disambiguation), Multiple people
- Dale Chihuly (born 1941), American glass sculptor and entrepreneur
- Dale Clausnitzer (born 1951), American politician and businessman
- Dale L. Compton (born 1935), American aerospace engineer and NASA Ames Research Center director
- Dale Cook (born 1958), American kickboxer
- Dale Copley (born 1991), Australian rugby league footballer
- Dale Crover (born 1967), American rock musician
- Dale Davis (disambiguation), Multiple people
- Dale Deppe, American horticulturist
- Dale Depper, American musician and multi-instrumentalist
- Dale Dye (born 1944), American actor, technical advisor, radio personality and writer
- Dale Earnhardt (1951–2001), American race car driver
- Dale Earnhardt Jr. (born 1974), American race car driver, son of Dale Earnhardt, Sr.
- Dale E. Fahrnbruch (1924–2005), justice of the Nebraska Supreme Court
- Dale Ferguson (disambiguation), Multiple people
- Dale Finucane (born 1991), Australian rugby league footballer
- Dale Folwell (born 1958), American politician
- Dale Griffin (1948–2016), English drummer and founding member of 1970s rock band
- Dale Hamer (1937–2024), American football official
- Dale Hawkins (1936–2010), American rock singer, songwriter and rhythm guitarist nicknamed "Dale"
- Dale Hey (1947–2012), American professional wrestler better known as Buddy Roberts
- Dale Ho (born 1977), U.S. district judge of the U.S. District Court for the Southern District of New York
- Dale Houston (1940–2007), American singer
- Dale Jarrett (born 1956), American race car driver and commentator
- Dale Jennings (disambiguation), Multiple people
- Dale Johnston (disambiguation), Multiple people
- Dale Jones, Multiple people
- Dale Lewis (disambiguation), Multiple people
- Dale Mabry (1891–1922), American World War I aviator
- Dale Marshall (disambiguation), Multiple people
- Dale Martin (disambiguation), Multiple people
- Dale Midkiff (born 1959), American actor
- Dale Mitchell (disambiguation), Multiple people
- Dale Moss (born 1988), American football player
- Dale Munson (1931–2012), American television and radio personality
- Dale Murphy (disambiguation), Multiple people
- Dale Price (1924–1997), Arkansas Supreme Court justice
- Dale G. Renlund (born 1952), American religious leader and physician
- Dale Roberts (disambiguation), Multiple people
- Dale Robertson (1923–2013), American actor
- Dale Samuels (born 1931), American football player
- Dale Saunders (disambiguation), Multiple people
- Dale Smith (disambiguation), Multiple people
- Dale Snodgrass (1949–2021), United States Navy aviator and air show performer
- Dale Spainhower, American politician
- Dale Sprague, American politician
- Dale Stephens (disambiguation), Multiple people
- Dale Stevenson (disambiguation), Multiple people
- Dale Steyn (born 1983), South African cricketer
- Dale Van Sickel (1907–1977), American football player, actor and stuntman
- Dale Thomas (disambiguation), Multiple people
- Dale Torborg (born 1971), American baseball trainer and professional wrestler
- Dale Turner (disambiguation), Multiple people
- Dale Vince (born 1961), British green energy industrialist
- Dale Watson (disambiguation), Multiple people
- Dale Walz (born 1964), American politician and police officer
- Dale Whibley (born 1997), Canadian actor
- Dale Williams (disambiguation), Multiple people
- Dale Wilson (disambiguation), Multiple people
- Dale Winton (1955–2018), British television presenter
- Dale Wood (disambiguation), Multiple people
- Dale E. Wolf (1924–2021), American businessman and politician
- Dale Wright (disambiguation), Multiple people
- Dale A. Zimmerman (1928–2021), American naturalist

== Women with the name ==
- Dale Austen (born 1910), New Zealand actress
- Dale Aycock, American author
- Dale Bozzio (born 1955), lead singer of Missing Persons
- Dale Ann Bradley (fl. 1980s–2020s), American bluegrass musician
- Dale Campbell (born 1954), Canadian artist
- Dale Copeland (born 1943), New Zealand college and assemblage artist
- Dale Daniel, American country music artist
- Dale Davis (disambiguation), Multiple people
- Dale DeArmond (1914–2006), American printmaker and book illustrator
- Dale Dickey (born 1961), American actress
- Dale Eggeling (born 1954), American professional golfer
- Dale Evans (1912–2001), American actress, singer, and songwriter
- Dale Clark Farran, American teacher
- Dale S. Fischer (born 1951), US district court judge
- Dale Fuller (actress) (1885–1948), American actress
- Dale Pickett Gay (1891–1988), American businesswoman
- Dale Greig (1937–2019), Scottish runner
- Dale Kennington (1935–2017), American painter
- Dale Kent (born 1942), Australian historian
- Dale Marshall (disambiguation), Multiple people
- Dale McCormick (born 1947), American politician
- Dale Mercer, American socialite, interior designer, and television personality
- Dale Messick (1906–2005), American comic strip artist
- Dale Noelle, American model and educator
- Dale-Elizabeth Pehrsson (fl. 1980s–2020s), American academic administrator
- Dale Raoul (born 1955), American film and television actress
- Dale Reid (1959–2023), Scottish professional golfer
- Dale Sandler (fl. 1970s–2020s), American epidemiologist
- Dale Soules, American actress
- Dale Spender (1943–2023), Australian feminist scholar, teacher, writer and consultant
- Dale Tryon, Baroness Tryon (1948–1997), British fashion maven and close friend of Prince Charles
- Dale Wakefield, Australian politician
- Dale Doherty, (aka Dayle Doherty, Dayle Armstrong or "Day") American poet, actress and artist

== Fictional characters ==
- Chip 'n' Dale, cartoon chipmunks
- Dale Arden, fellow-adventurer and love interest of Flash Gordon
- Dale "The Whale" Biederbeck, a recurring villain in the television series Monk
- Dale Cooper, protagonist of the series Twin Peaks
- Dale Gribble, on the animated television series King of the Hill
- Dale Horvath, from the comic book series The Walking Dead and from the American television series of the same name
- Dale McGillicutty, from the Teenage Mutant Ninja Turtles comic book series

== See also ==
- Dale (surname)
- Dale (disambiguation)
