= Dale =

Dale, The Dale, Dales or The Dales may refer to:

== People and fictional characters ==
- Dale (given name), a list of people and fictional characters with the given name or nickname
- Dale (surname), a list of people and fictional characters

== Places ==
=== Terminology ===
- Dale (landform), an open valley
  - Dale (place name element)

=== Norway ===
- Dale, Fjaler, the administrative centre of Fjaler municipality, Vestland county
- Dale, Sel, a village in Sel municipality in Innlandet county
- Dale, Vaksdal, the administrative centre of Vaksdal municipality, Vestland county

=== United Kingdom ===
- Dale, Cumbria, England, a hamlet
- Dale, Derbyshire, England, a village
- Dale, Pembrokeshire, Wales, a village

=== United States ===
- Dale County, Alabama
- Dales, California, an unincorporated community
- Dale, Illinois, an unincorporated community
- Dale, Indiana, a town
- Dale, Iowa, an unincorporated community
- Dale, Kentucky, a defunct community since annexed to Fort Thomas
- Dale, Michigan, a former community
- Dale, Minnesota, a ghost town
- Dale, Nebraska, a ghost town
- Dale, New York, a hamlet
- Dale, Oklahoma, an unincorporated community and census-designated place
- Dale, Oregon, an unincorporated community
- Dale, Pennsylvania, a borough
- Dale, Berks County, Pennsylvania, an unincorporated community
- Dale, South Carolina, an unincorporated community
- Dale, Texas, an unincorporated community
- Dale, West Virginia, an unincorporated community
- Dale, Wisconsin, a town
  - Dale (CDP), Wisconsin, a census-designated place within the town
- Dale Creek, Wisconsin - see Dale Creek Crossing
- Dale Township (disambiguation)

=== Elsewhere ===
- Mount Dale, Western Australia, Australia
- Dale, Ontario, Canada, a community
- Dale (woreda), Ethiopia, a district
- Dale, Lesser Poland Voivodeship, Poland, a village
- Dale (crater), on the Moon

== Churches in Norway ==
- Dale Church (Fjaler), Fjaler municipality, Vestland county
- Dale Church (Luster), Luster municipality, Vestland county
- Dale Church (Vaksdal), Vaksdal municipality, Vestland county
- Dale Church, also known as Norddal Church, Fjord municipality, Møre og Romsdal county

== Arts and entertainment ==
- Dale (film), a 2007 documentary about the life of Dale Earnhardt
- Dale (album), a 2015 album by American rapper Pitbull
- Dale (Middle-earth), a city in J. R. R. Tolkien's fictional universe of Middle-earth

== Business ==
- Dale of Norway, a textile company based in Dale, Vaksdal municipality, Norway
- Dale Electronics, Inc., an American electronic components manufacturer acquired by Vishay Intertechnology in 1985
- Dale (automobile), a 1970s prototype two-seater American car

== Military ==
- USS Dale, various ships
- RNAS Dale (HMS Goldcrest), a former Royal Naval Air Station in Pembrokeshire, Wales, also used by the Royal Air Force
- Dale Fort, a mid-19th-century coastal artillery fort near Dale, Pembrokeshire, Wales

== Other uses ==
- The Dale, nickname for Rochdale A.F.C., a football club based in Rochdale, Greater Manchester, England

== See also ==
- Dale City, Virginia, United States, a census-designated place
- Derbyshire Dales, England, a local government district
- Boy Scouts of America v. Dale, a First Amendment opinion from the US Supreme Court
- Alan-a-Dale, a minstrel in the Robin Hood legend
- Dales (disambiguation)
- Dell (disambiguation)
- Dalles (disambiguation)
