= Dale (surname) =

Dale is a surname. Notable people with this name include:

== Academics and scientists ==
- Amy Marjorie Dale (1901–1967), British classicist
- Angela Dale (born 1945) British statistician
- Edgar Dale (1900–1985), US educationist
- Henry Hallett Dale (1875–1968), English neuroscientist
- James Charles Dale (1792–1872), English entomologist
- Nellie Dale (1865–1967), British educator
- Peter Dale, (1938–2024) British poet and translator
- Samuel Dale (1659–1739), English naturalist and physician

== Entertainment industry professionals ==
- Alan Dale (born 1947), New Zealand-born Australian actor
- Carlotta Dale (c. 1916-1988)), American singer
- Charlie Dale (1881–1971), half of the American vaudeville comedy duo Smith and Dale
- Cynthia Dale (born 1961), Canadian television dancer and actress
- Darren Dale, Australian film and television producer
- Esther Dale (1885–1961), American actress
- Ian Anthony Dale (born 1978), American television actor
- James Badge Dale (born 1978), American actor
- Jennifer Dale (born 1956), Canadian television dancer and actress
- Virginia Dale (1917–1994), American film actress

== Musicians ==
- Alan Dale (singer) (1926–2002), American singer
- Benjamin Dale (1885–1943), English composer
- Dick Dale (1937–2019), American surf-rock musician and songwriter
- Felicia Dale, American folk music singer-songwriter
- Jim Dale (born 1935), British singer, comedian and actor
- Jimmy Dale (musician) (1935–2017), Canadian arranger, conductor, composer, pianist, and organist
- Kathleen Dale, composer, pianist and musicologist
- Mickey Dale, (born 1968) keyboardist with English rock band Embrace

== Politicians ==
- Bob Dale (politician) (1875–1953) South Australian unionist and politician
- Charles M. Dale (1893–1978), American jurist & politician
- Don Dale (1944–1990), in Northern Territory of Australia, eponym of the detention centre
- Iain Dale (born 1962), British conservative blogger
- Porter H. Dale (1867–1933), US congressman and senator
- Shana Dale (born 1964), American Deputy Administrator of NASA
- Thomas Dale (born ~1570), British naval commander Virginia deputy-governor
- Tony Dale (born 1969), American politician
- William Dale (politician) (c. 1830–1904), politician and teetotaler in South Australia

== Religious figures ==
- Robert William Dale (1829–1895), English Nonconformist church leader
- T. Pelham Dale (1821–1892), Anglo-Catholic ritualist clergyman

== Sportspeople ==
- Dale (Middlesex cricketer), English cricketer, playing 1789–1809
- Adam Dale (born 1968), Australian cricketer
- Adrian Dale (born 1968), South African cricketer
- Ajeet Singh Dale (born 2000), English cricketer
- Alexander Dale Oen (1985–2012), Norwegian swimmer
- Carl Dale (born 1966), Welsh footballer
- Carroll Dale (born 1938), American football wide receiver
- D. J. Dale (born 2000), American football player
- Dominic Dale (born 1971), Welsh professional snooker player and commentator
- Eleanor Dale (born 2002), English footballer
- Harry Dale (1899–1985), English footballer
- Jerry Dale (born 1933), American baseball umpire
- Jimmy Dale (1870–1948), Scottish footballer
- Johannes Dale (born 1997), Norwegian biathlete
- John Dale (cricketer, born 1848) (1848–1895), English rower and cricketer
- Kari Brattset Dale (born 1991) Norwegian handball player
- Mark Dale (born 1982), English cricketer
- Owen Dale (born 1998), English footballer
- Roland Dale (1927–2012), American football player
- Stacey Dales (born 1979), Canadian basketball player and sportscaster

== Others ==
- Arch Dale (1882–1962), political cartoonist
- David Dale (1739–1806), Scottish industrialist and philanthropist
- George Dale (criminal) (died 1934), American executed murderer
- Louise Boyd Dale (1913–1967), American philatelist
- Richard Dale (1756–1826), American Continental Navy commodore
- Robert Dale (explorer) (1812–1853), European explorer of Australia
- Samuel Dale (1772–1841), American soldier and politician
- T. Lawrence Dale (1884–1959), English architect

== Fictional characters ==
- Jimmie Dale, a pulp fiction character blackmailed into fighting crime
- Joan Dale, the first Miss America (DC Comics)

== See also ==
- Senator Dale (disambiguation)
- Dale (given name)
- Dale (disambiguation)
- Dales (disambiguation), which includes a list of people with the surname
- Dahl (surname) or Dahle, a surname with a similar spelling
