= Dale Anderson =

Dale Anderson may refer to:

- Dale Anderson (boxer) (1953–2019), Canadian boxer
- Dale Anderson (footballer) (born 1970), English football forward
- Dale Anderson (ice hockey) (1932–2015), Canadian ice hockey defencemen
- Dale Anderson (politician) (1916–1996), American politician
- Dale Anderson (sportsman) (1931–2021), Australian rules footballer and First-class cricketer
- Dale A. Anderson (born 1936), American aerospace engineer
- Dale V. Andersen (1917–2004), American politician
