= Deppe =

Deppe is a surname. Notable people with the surname include:

- Dale Deppe, American horticulturalist
- Ferdinand Deppe (1794–1861), German naturalist, explorer and painter
- Hans Deppe (1897–1969), German actor and film director
- Jaro Deppe (born 1948), German footballer
- Ludwig Deppe (1828–1890), German composer, conductor and piano teacher
- Paula Deppe (1886–1922), Bohemian-German painter, engraver and illustrator
- Royce Deppe (born 1965), South African tennis player
- Ted Deppe, American poet
- Ulrike Deppe (born 1953), German slalom canoeist

== See also ==
- Depper
