= Dale Murphy (disambiguation) =

Dale Murphy (born 1956) is an American baseball player.

Dale Murphy may also refer to:

- Dale D. Murphy, professor
- Dale Murphy (fisherman), casualty of the 1991 Perfect Storm
- Dale Murphy (footballer) (born 1959), Australian rules footballer
