= Nishnabotna, Missouri =

Extinct community in Missouri, U.S.

- Extinct community
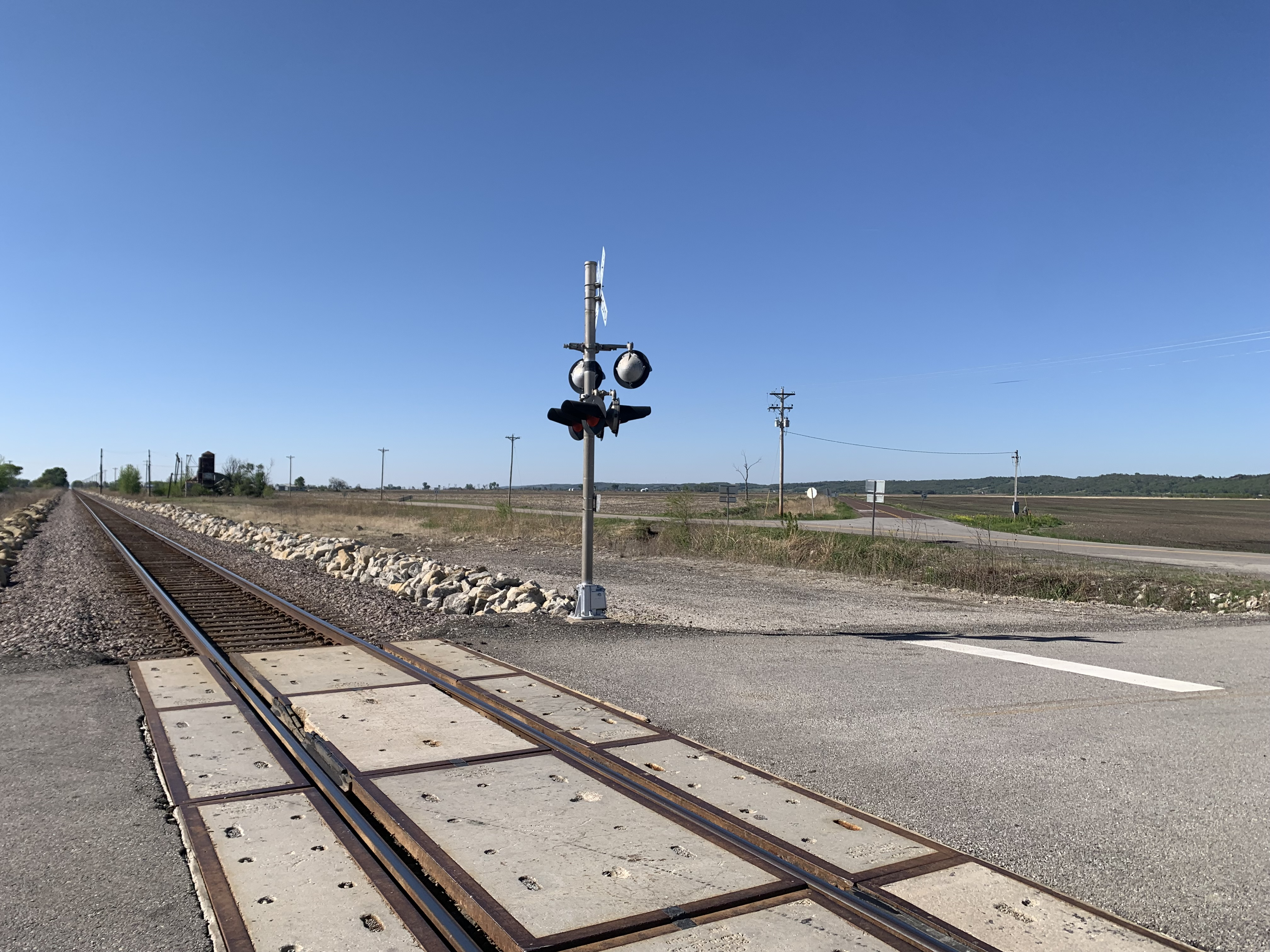
- BNSF Railway and Route 111 at the site of Nishnabotna

- Location within Missouri
- Coordinates: 40°17′45″N 95°30′31″W
- Country: United States
- State: Missouri
- County: Atchison
- Township: Clark
- Elevation: 873 ft (266 m)
- GNIS feature ID: 2587101

Nishnabotna is an extinct hamlet in southwestern Atchison County, in the U.S. state of Missouri.

Nishnabotna was laid out in 1877 and named after the nearby Nishnabotna River, and it was located on the Kansas City and Omaha Line of the Chicago, Burlington, and Quincy Railroad. An alternative name of the settlement was Nishne Station. It was located 5.5 miles southeast of Langdon and 4.5 miles northeast of Corning along the railroad. A post office called Nishnabotna was established in 1871 and remained in operation until 1953. The population in 1915 was about 30.
