= Clark Township, Atchison County, Missouri =

Township in Atchison County, Missouri, U.S.

Clark Township
- Township
- Coordinates: 40°19′18″N 95°26′18″W
- Country: United States
- State: Missouri
- County: Atchison

Area
  - Total: 75.37 sq mi (195.2 km^{2})
  - Land: 75.05 sq mi (194.4 km^{2})
  - Water: 0.32 sq mi (0.83 km^{2}) 0.42%
- Elevation: 994 ft (303 m)

Population (2020)
  - Total: 898
  - Density: 12/sq mi (4.6/km^{2})
- FIPS code: 29-00513996
- GNIS feature ID: 766232

Clark Township is a township in Atchison County, Missouri, United States. At the 2020 census, its population was 898.

== History ==
Clark Township was established in 1845 and was one of the five original townships in Atchison County. it was reduced to its present limits at the establishment of Dale Township in 1876.

A ferry in the southwest of the township crossed the Missouri River to St. Deroin in Nebraska.

== Geography ==
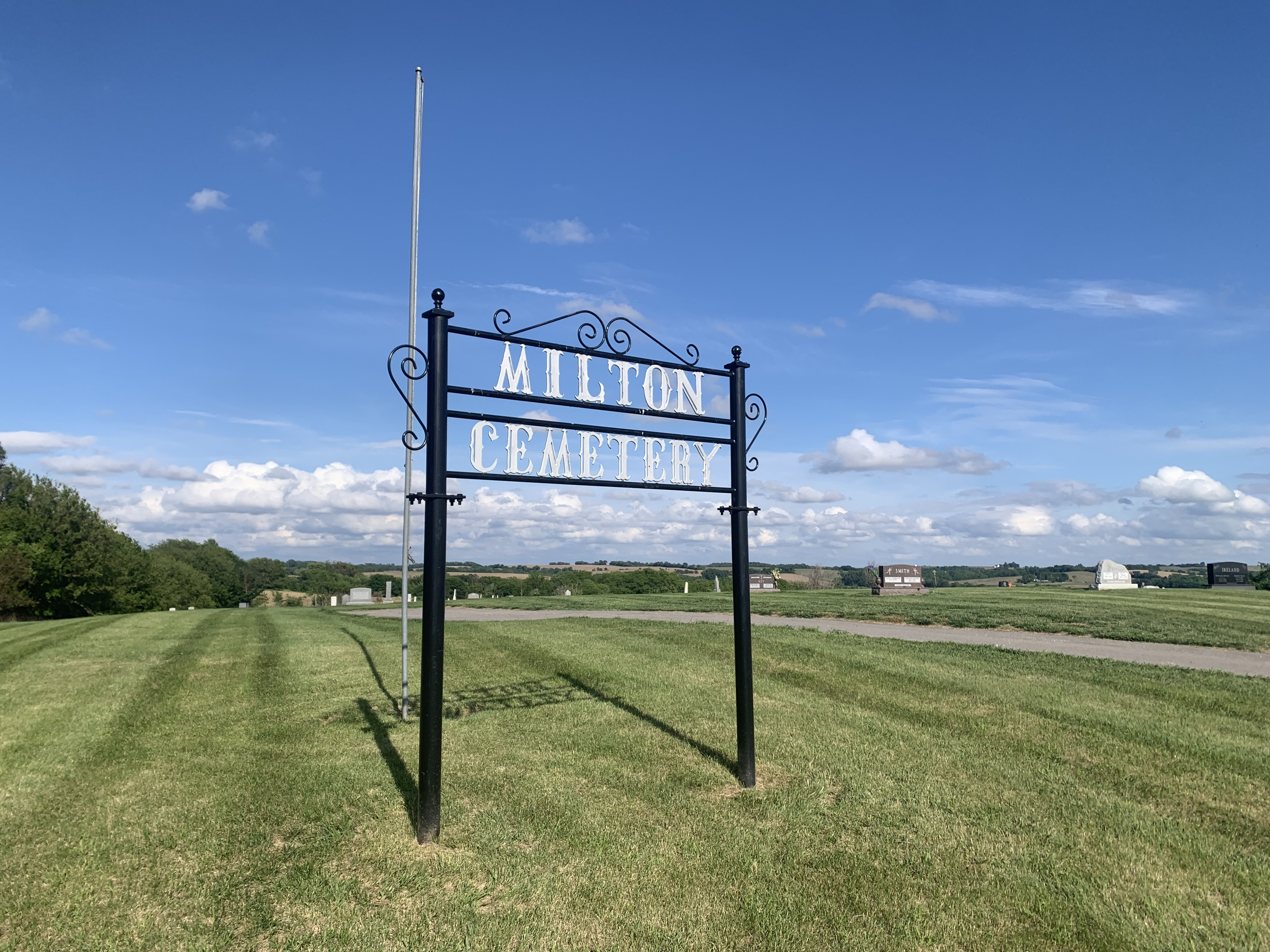
Milton Cemetery in south Clark Township at Milton

Clark Township covers an area of 75.37 square miles (195.2 km^{2}) and contains one incorporated settlement, Fairfax. Two other former settlements were present: Milton and Nishnabotna

The streams of Cow Branch, Old Channel Nishnabotna River, and Rock Creek run through this township. It contains five cemeteries: Beck, English Grove, Milton, Mount Hope, and Pleasant Ridge.

Deroin Bend Island, an island of the Missouri River, is partly located in the southwesternmost portion of the township but is mostly located in Lincoln Township, Holt County.

== Transportation ==
Clark Township contains one airport, Steele Airport.

=== Major highways ===
The following highways travel through the township:

- Interstate 29
- U.S. Route 59
- Route 46
- Route 111
- Route J
- Route KK
- Route OO
- Route TT
- Route W
- Route Z
