= Lincoln Township, Holt County, Missouri =

Township in Holt County, Missouri, U.S.

Lincoln Township
- Township
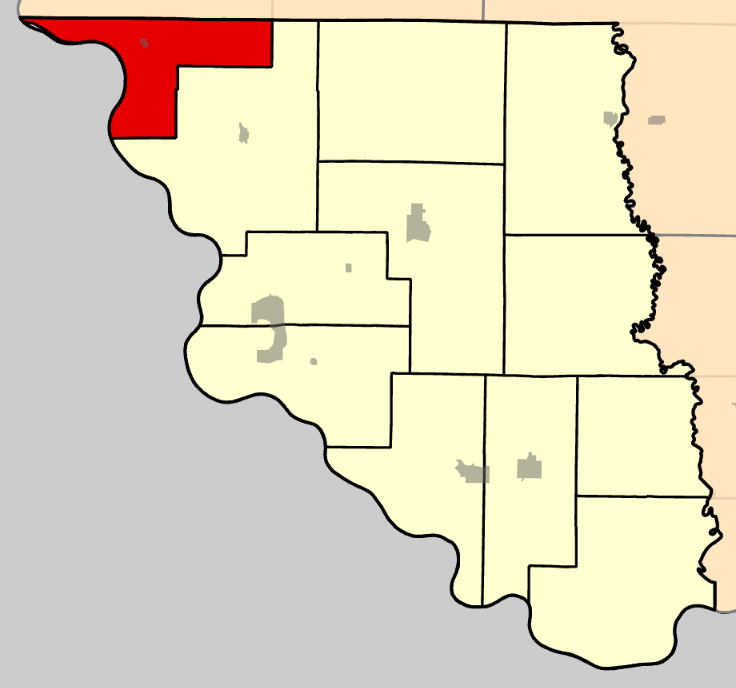
- Coordinates: 40°14′29″N 95°26′08″W
- Country: United States
- State: Missouri
- County: Holt

Area
  - Total: 24.28 sq mi (62.9 km^{2})
  - Land: 23.42 sq mi (60.7 km^{2})
  - Water: 0.86 sq mi (2.2 km^{2}) 3.54%
- Elevation: 873 ft (266 m)

Population (2020)
  - Total: 31
  - Density: 1.3/sq mi (0.50/km^{2})
- FIPS code: 29-08742770
- GNIS feature ID: 766769

Lincoln Township is a township in Holt County, Missouri, United States. At the 2020 census, its population was 31. It is the smallest township in the county by area, being only around 20 square miles. The village of Corning is located in the center of the township.

== History ==
Lincoln Township was established on March 22, 1871, and was likely named after President Abraham Lincoln.

The Kansas City, St. Joseph, and Council Bluffs Railroad was completed through this township in 1869.

=== Settlements ===
Hemme's Landing was a community on the east bank of the Missouri River, two miles west of Corning. It was settled in 1844 and was a major trading post between St. Joseph, Missouri and Council Bluffs, Iowa. The original building for St. John's Church was built in 1860 at Hemme's Landing at Hemmes Bend. The same area was also known as Lowell. The Missouri River eventually encroached upon the land until it became part of Nebraska.

A community called Lewisville was platted in March 1860, but nothing much came from the project.

== Geography ==
Deroin Bend Island, an island of the Missouri River, is located in the westernmost portion of the township and extends into Clark Township, Atchison County. The island is within the Deroin Bend Conservation Area and is approximately 400 acres (160 ha). The bend was named due to its location directly across from the former town of St. Deroin, Nebraska.

== Transportation ==
The following highways travel through the township:

- Interstate 29
- U.S. Route 59
- Route 111
- Route W
