= Dael (given name) =

Dael is a given name. Notable people with the name include:

- Dael Fry (born 1997), English footballer
- Dael Orlandersmith (born 1960), American actress, poet, and playwright
- Dael FM (2026-), University Radio Falmer radio show

== See also ==
- Dale (given name)
- Wael
