= Dales =

Dales or The Dales may refer to:

== People ==
- Brian Dales, a member of the American pop rock band The Summer Set
- Burke Dales (1977–2024), Canadian football punter
- Francis A. Dales (1923–2003), American cadet midshipman awarded the Merchant Marine Distinguished Service Medal, the highest merchant marine award
- George F. Dales (1927–1992), American archaeology professor
- Hugh Dales (1888–1964), English first-class cricketer
- Ien Dales (1931–1994), Dutch politician and social worker, Minister of the Interior and State Secretary for Social Affairs and Employment
- Nathan Dales, 21st century Canadian actor
- Richard Dales (born 1942), British retired diplomat
- Stacey Dales (born 1979), Canadian-American reporter and former basketball player

== Places ==
- Yorkshire Dales, a series of valleys or dales in England

- Yorkshire Dales National Park

- Dalarna, Sweden, also known as the Dales, a historical province
- Dales, California, United States, an unincorporated community
- The Dales (Christmas Island), a wetland site
- The Dales Open Space, a Local Nature Reserve in Ipswich, Suffolk, England
- Dales Island, Mac. Robertson Land, Antarctica

== Other uses ==
- Mrs Dale's Diary, also known as The Dales, a British radio soap opera which aired from 1948 to 1969
- The Dales (TV programme), a British travel documentary show that aired from 2011 to 2013
- Dales High Way, a long-distance footpath in northern England
- Dales Pony, a British pony breed
- Dales Marine Services, a UK ship repair and maintenance company
- Dales ware, 3rd- and 4th-century pottery
- Dales, a short-lived low-cost branding of some Asda supermarkets in the UK

== See also ==
- Dale (disambiguation)
- Dalles (disambiguation)
