= Dale Township, Atchison County, Missouri =

Township in Atchison County, Missouri, U.S.

Dale Township
- Township
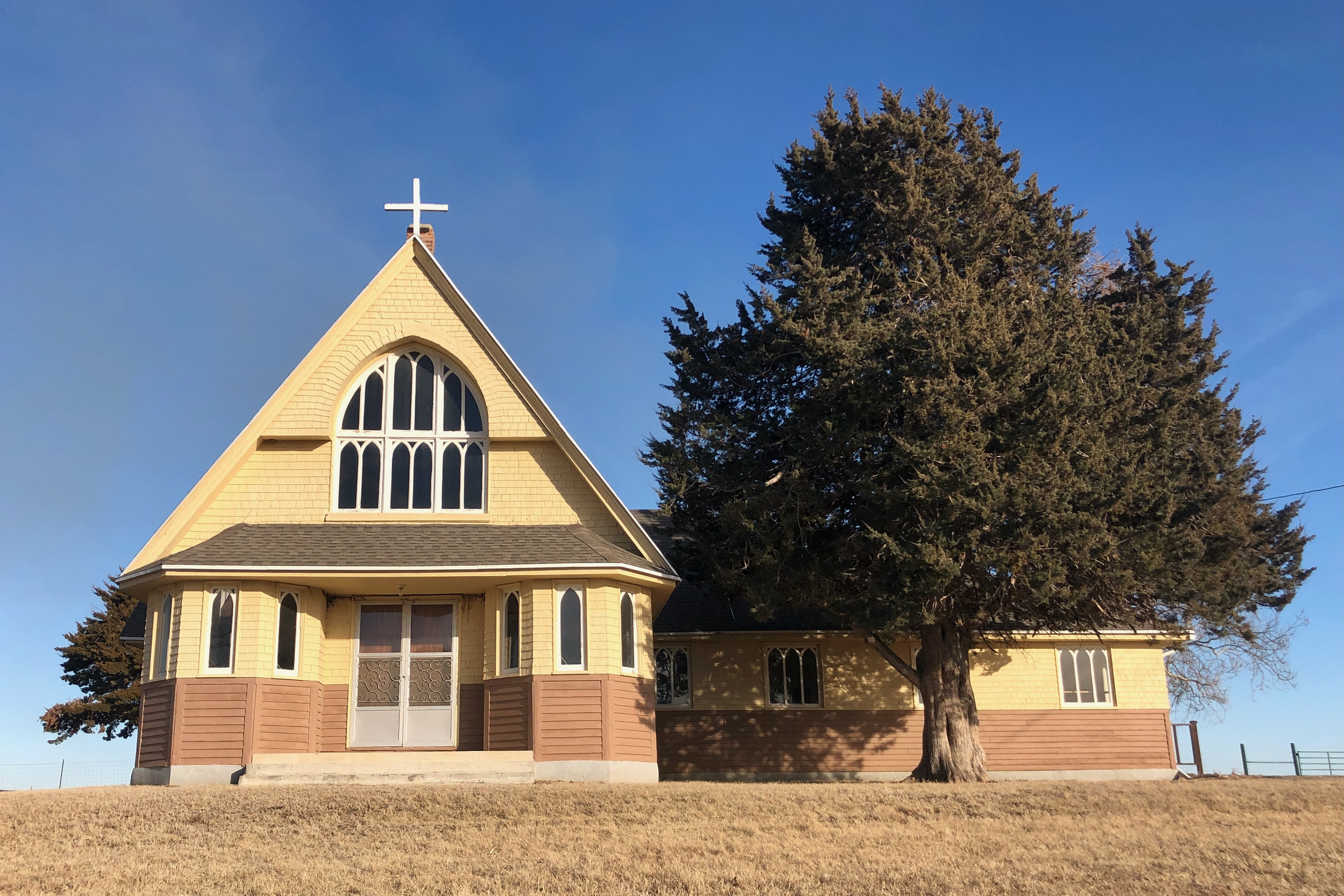
- St. Oswald's Episcopal Church in southern Dale Township.

- Coordinates: 40°19′43″N 95°15′53″W
- Country: United States
- State: Missouri
- County: Atchison

Area
  - Total: 81.61 sq mi (211.4 km^{2})
  - Land: 81.6 sq mi (211 km^{2})
  - Water: 0.01 sq mi (0.026 km^{2}) 0.01%
- Elevation: 1,020 ft (310 m)

Population (2020)
  - Total: 187
  - Density: 2.3/sq mi (0.89/km^{2})
- FIPS code: 29-00518028
- GNIS feature ID: 766235

Dale Township is a township in Atchison County, Missouri, United States. At the 2020 census, its population was 187.

== Etymology ==
Dale Township most likely was named for the dales within its borders.

== History ==
Dale Township was established on November 25, 1871, after the county court ordered the division of Clark Township with the West Fork of the Little Tarkio Creek to be the boundary. The eastern portion was called Walkup Precinct, which is the present Dale Township, and the western portion, called Beck Township, remained as the limits of Clark Township.

== Geography ==
Dale Township covers an area of exactly nine sections square, or 81.61 square miles (211.4 km^{2}), making it the second largest township in the county, It contains no incorporated settlements but two extinct hamlets, Dotham and Osawld, were located in the township.

The streams of Hickory Branch and Long Branch run through this township.

== Settlements ==
Elk Dale is an extinct hamlet in Dale Township. The GNIS classifies it as a populated place, but the precise location of the town site is unknown. A post office called Elk Dale was in operation from 1875 until 1900. A schoolhouse called Elk Dale was located in the southwest of this township, in the southern part of Section 8 of Township 63 North Range 39 West. Elk Dale was named for the elk living in the area when it was settled.

=== Groves ===
Walkup's Grove, one of the townships' first settlements, was located on 320 acres (130 ha) of land on the East Tarkio. It was named after James Walkup, who was previously in Holt County. This settlement was the namesake for the short-lived Walkup Precinct. It was located around the mouth of Hickory Creek a mile southwest of Dotham. There was a church named Walkup Grove Baptist Church that was erected in 1881. The church was active until around 1951. The church was bulldozed in 1995. A cemetery called Walkup Grove, the only one in the township, still remains.

Two miles southwest lay Waugh's Grove which was settled by 1865 by a Scot and was the site of a stock farm. The founder, Robert Waugh, sold his possessions and returned to Scotland in 1881.

Another settlement was Hickory Grove.

== Transportation ==
Dale Township contains one airport, Cleveland Airport.

The following highways travel through the township:

- Route 46
- Route DD
- Route EE
- Route HH
- Route MM
- Route N
- Route TT
