= Dale Turner =

Dale Turner may refer to:

- Dale Turner (cricketer), Australian cricketer
- Dale Turner (trumpeter), American trumpet player with the American new wave band Oingo Boingo
- Dale Turner (songwriter), American singer-songwriter, rock musician, and multi-instrumentalist/record producer
- Dale Turner (politician), American politician from Oklahoma
- Dale Turner (Jericho), fictional character
- Dale Turner, a fictional jazz musician in the 1986 film Round Midnight
