= Dale Township =

Dale Township is the name of several townships in the United States:

- Dale Township, McLean County, Illinois
- Dale Township, O'Brien County, Iowa
- Dale Township, Kingman County, Kansas
- Dale Township, Cottonwood County, Minnesota
- Dale Township, Atchison County, Missouri
