= Richard Dale =

American naval officer (1756–1826)

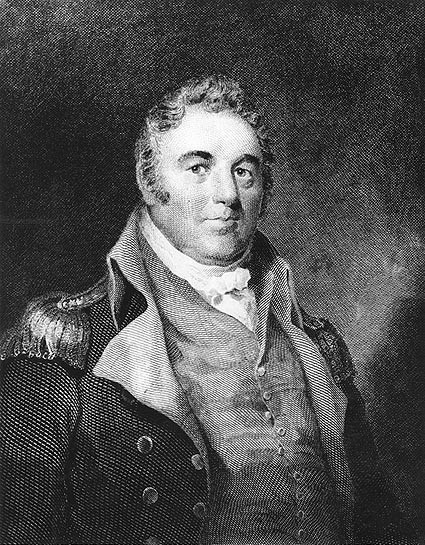
- Dale in an 1865 engraving by Richard W. Dodson
- Born: November 6, 1756; Portsmouth parish, Norfolk County, Virginia, British America
- Died: February 26, 1826 (aged 69); Philadelphia, Pennsylvania, U.S.
- Burial place: Laurel Hill Cemetery, Philadelphia, Pennsylvania
- Spouse(s): Dorethea Crathorne, the cousin of John Barry's wife
- Military career
- Allegiance: United States of America
- Branch: Continental Navy; United States Navy
- Service years: 1776–1802
- Rank: Commodore
- Commands: USS Ganges
- Conflicts: American Revolutionary War; First Barbary War
- Memorials: dedicated, 9 May 1917, Olde Towne Portsmouth, Virginia

Signature
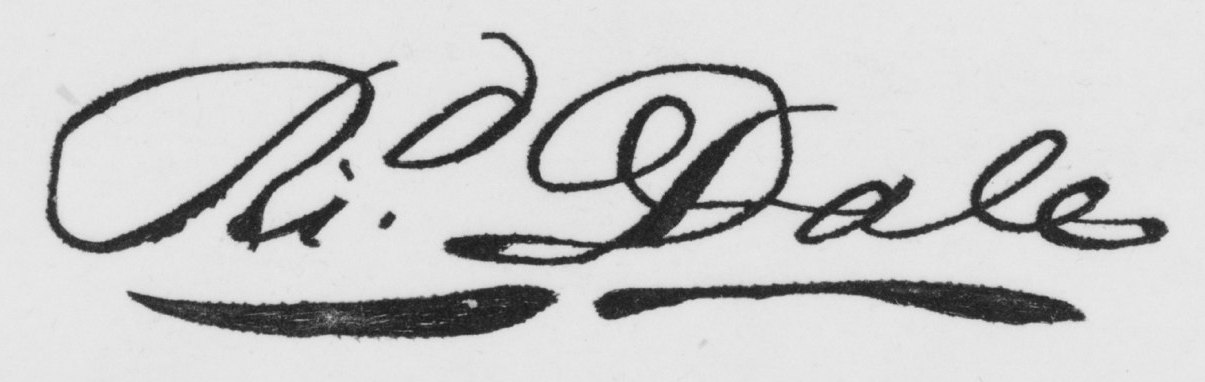

Richard Dale (November 6, 1756 – February 26, 1826) was an American naval officer who fought in the Continental Navy under John Barry and was first lieutenant for John Paul Jones during the naval battle off of Flamborough Head, England against HMS Serapis in the celebrated engagement of September 23, 1779. He became one of the six original commodores of the permanent United States Navy, and commanded a blockade of Tripoli in 1801 during the First Barbary War of Thomas Jefferson's presidency.

== Early years ==
Richard Dale was born in Portsmouth parish, Norfolk County, Virginia, the eldest son of Winfield Dale, shipwright and merchant, and Ann Sutherland. His father died when Dale was ten years old. Two years later, Dale signed on with a merchant vessel owned by an uncle that took him to Liverpool, England. Upon his return to Virginia, Dale became apprenticed to a ship-owner, through whom he made several journeys to the West Indies. Within five years, he achieved the rank of chief mate on a valuable brig. He remained in the merchant service until the spring of 1776.

== Revolutionary War ==
Dale's record during the Revolutionary War proved eclectic. After departing the merchant service in 1776 he signed on as a lieutenant in the navy of the colony of Virginia. His tenure proved brief, since he was captured shortly thereafter by a tender of the frigate HMS Liverpool. He knew many of the men in the ship's crew from his time as a merchant, and they persuaded Dale to sign up for the British cause. He served for Lord Dunmore, the royal governor of Virginia. While fighting for the British, Dale received his first battle wounds when he was caught in a confrontation with American pilot boats. During his convalescence in Norfolk, Virginia, he determined that he would return to the patriot cause at his first opportunity. En route to Jamaica, the British vessel upon which Dale traveled was captured by the American Captain John Barry on his ship USS Lexington. Dale volunteered to serve on the American ship, and entered their service with the rank of Midshipman. He continued on with Lexington after Barry was replaced as captain by William Hallock, who promoted Dale to Master's Mate. Unfortunately for Dale, the ship was captured by the British frigate HMS Pearl. Select officers from Lexington were taken onto Pearl as prisoners, Dale included, although a sudden gale permitted the rest of the America crew to escape. In January 1777, Dale was released in a prisoner exchange and returned to Lexington, now under yet another captain, Henry Johnston. Lexington joined a squadron that caused some destruction on the coast of Ireland, which compelled the British to chase and, eventually, capture the brig and its crew. They were taken to Plymouth, England and the crew imprisoned in Mill Prison in September 1777.

=== Mill Prison ===
Charged with high treason against the crown, Johnston, Dale and the rest of the crew were treated harshly in the prison. A lack of sufficient food compelled them at one point to kill and eat a dog for survival. Their conditions improved only after sympathetic British civilians collected enough money to supply them with the bare necessities for sustenance. Still, the American sailors were unprepared to wait out the remainder of the war in prison, and dug a tunnel under the wall through which they attempted to make their escape. Dale and a colleague were re-captured as they attempted to board a ship from London to Dunkirk, and were returned to Mill Prison. As punishment for their escape attempt, they were both subjected to forty days of solitude in the "Black Hole."

While in prison, Dale obtained a journal wherein he used his time constructively. He continued the education he had not completed in his youth. He taught himself the multiplication table, different weights and measures, multiplication and division, as well as fractions. He also examined the rules of barter, stocks and interest, and created a glossary of different naval commands necessary to captain a ship.

After a captivity at Mill Prison that lasted over a year, Dale finally managed to successfully escape in February, 1779. He walked out of the prison gates without creating suspicion, wearing the uniform of a British officer. He never recorded how he had obtained the uniform. He also obtained the necessary papers in London to leave England and make his escape to L'Orient, France.

=== Bonhomme Richard ===
In L'Orient, Dale signed on as Master's Mate with John Paul Jones on USS Bonhomme Richard, which was a French East Indiaman that had been converted to a warship. He received a promotion to First Lieutenant in short order. The ship cruised along the west coast of Ireland and brought the war into British waters. Through the capture or destruction of many vessels, he contributed to the disruption of British trade, and made many residents impatient for the war to end.

On September 23, 1779, Bonhomme Richard met HMS Serapis off the coast of Flamborough Head, near Yorkshire. Described as being somewhat reckless in his bravery, Dale commanded the forward guns in the close fighting of the battle. When rumors that Bonhomme Richard was sinking reached him from below decks, and that the crew was prepared to surrender, Dale went to ascertain the damage. Upon his assessment that the ship would not yet sink, he inspired the crew to persist in the fight. He compelled his British prisoners to man the pumps to keep the ship afloat while the battle continued above.

After Captain Richard Pearson of Serapis struck his flag and declared the battle an American victory, Dale, as second in command of Bonhomme Richard, was the first American to board the British vessel. He then arranged for Pearson to meet with Jones to arrange the surrender of Serapis. Once his duties had been fulfilled, Dale realized that he had been wounded in the melee. A large splinter had resulted in a serious injury to Dale's foot and ankle. The pain from the wound caused him to collapse and faint.

When the damage done to Bonhomme Richard proved irreparable, the Americans boarded HMS Serapis and departed the scene. Although he required some time to convalesce, Dale remained as Jones' first lieutenant for two more years, first on USS Alliance, then on USS Ariel. When Ariel arrived at the port of Philadelphia on the 14th of April, 1781, it was the first time Dale had been on American soil in four years. The rank of first lieutenant that Jones bestowed upon Dale was, to this point, recognized only by the French government that had financed Jones' privateer ventures. In recognition for his services, the American Continental Congress now officially recognized his rank as well, and made him a first lieutenant in the Continental Navy.

=== Continental Navy ===
When Congress appointed John Paul Jones as commander of the not-yet-built 74-gun ship-of-the line USS America, Jones asked Dale to remain in his service. Dale declined Jones' offer, concerned that he would be kept away from sea too long during construction of the ship. His decision proved astute, since Congress ultimately gave the ship to the French government in payment of a debt, rather than to Jones to captain. Instead, Dale signed on as lieutenant for Captain Nicholson of USS Trumbull, for the Continental Navy. Almost immediately after its departure from Philadelphia, Trumbull was confronted by a British frigate during a severe storm. Dale was wounded, then captured in the ensuing fight and taken to New York City. New York had been occupied by British forces since 1776, and Dale was again a prisoner of war.

This time, his imprisonment was comparatively short. Continental agents negotiated an early release for Dale. Within two months' time, he was free again. He signed on as the first officer on the American privateer USS Queen of France, a large merchant ship for which the Continental Congress approved a letter of marque. This gave Queen of France the authority to attack British vessels in the name of the Continental Navy. When Dale received command of the ship, he was able to use it to advantage and captured a number of the enemy's vessels.

Dale returned to Philadelphia in February 1783. When the war officially ended with the signing of the Treaty of Paris in September of that year, the Continental Navy was officially disbanded. Along with all the other Continental officers, Dale's commission ended and he became a civilian for the first time in eight years.

In 1783, Dale became an original member of the Pennsylvania Society of the Cincinnati.

== Merchant and family ==
Dale got involved in the China Trade after the war, both as an investor and as a seaman. He became a successful captain and merchant during his commercial ventures between the United States and seaports in the Far East, in both China and India. When he was stateside, he often found himself in Philadelphia, the capital of the new country during the years 1790 through 1800. He used this time to visit his former commander and lifelong friend, John Barry. On one visit, Dale met the cousin of Barry's wife Sarah, Dorethea Crathorne. Richard and Dorethea were married on September 15, 1791, at Christ Church in Philadelphia. Their first child was born the next year, while they lived at their first home together at 49 Pine Street. Seven more children were to follow. During their lives together in Philadelphia, the Dales also lived at 69 Pine, 271 Chestnut, 69 Spruce, and 296 Walnut Streets. The first ten years of their marriage often found Dale at sea as the captain of different vessels, either commanding merchant ships or in the newly established United States Navy.

== United States Navy ==
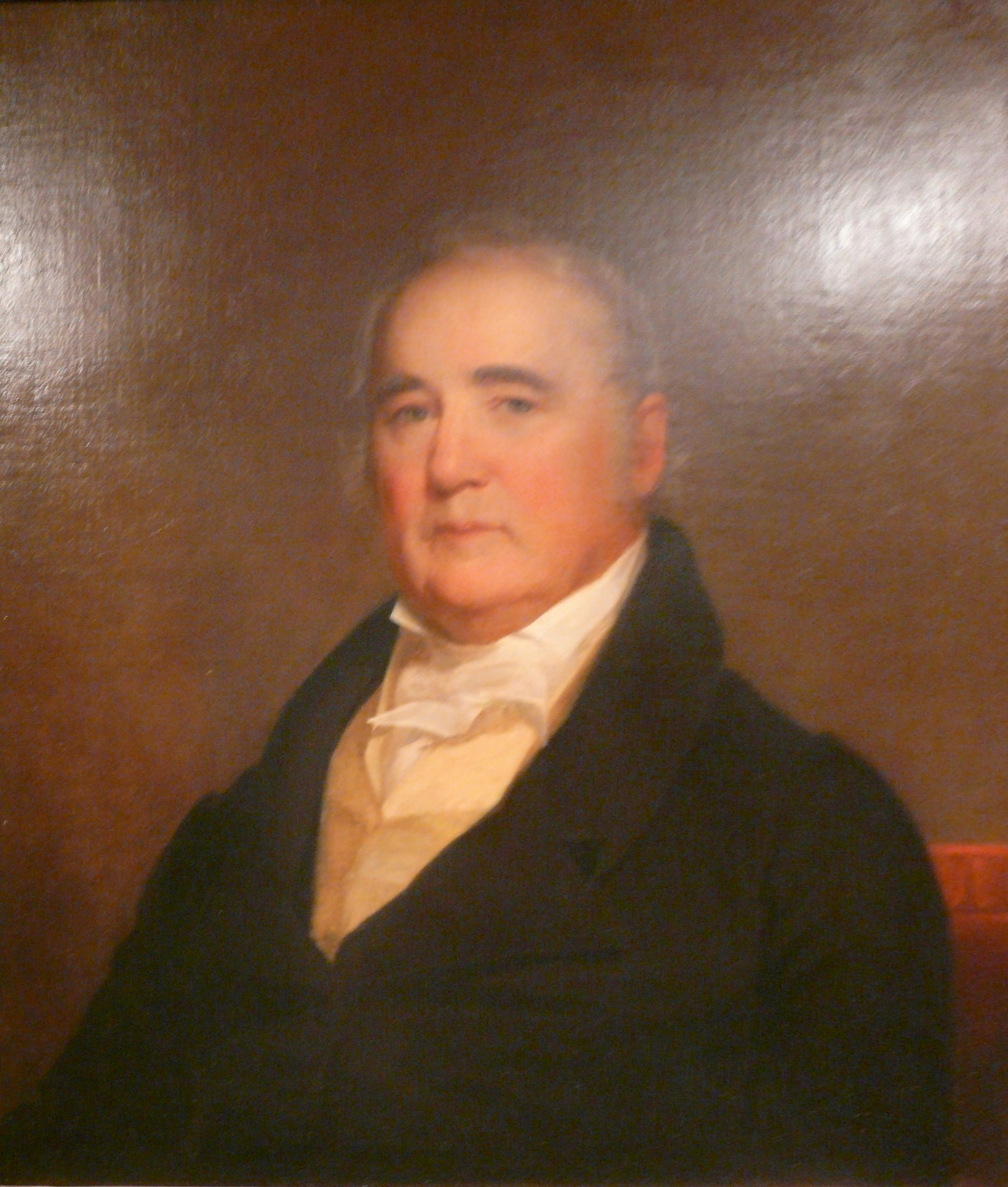
Portrait of Richard Dale by Jacob Eichholtz

In 1794, President George Washington established the United States Navy through order of Congress, ostensibly to protect American merchant vessels from the threat of privateers from the Barbary Nations, who took advantage of the new country's lack of a strong military presence in the Mediterranean Sea. Secretary of War Henry Knox selected six men, the elite of the country's naval command, to become the first commanders in the new branch of the American military. Richard Dale was selected as one of those six. Dale accepted the appointment and traveled to Norfolk, Virginia, for his first assignment: to supervise construction on the frigate USS Chesapeake. Due to the signing of a peace treaty with Algiers, one of the Barbary nations, which created some stability in the Mediterranean, construction on the frigate was halted. Dale requested and received a temporary furlough from the Navy and resumed business in the China trade. He was called back into the Navy in 1796 because of tensions that had developed between the United States and France, in what was known as the Quasi-War. As captain of the modified merchant ship USS Ganges, which was hastily equipped for military service, Dale gained the distinction of being the first man to command a ship at sea on behalf of the United States Navy. Ganges was used to protect the American coastline during the conflict and did not see any fighting.

A conflict of another kind caused Dale to request a second furlough after hostilities with France were redressed. Dale and some of the other five naval leaders became engaged in a dispute over their proper ranks. While government officials considered their concerns, Dale resumed the Far East trade. He commanded the Indiaman Canton, returning to Delaware Bay 11 April 1800. Upon his return to Philadelphia, the issue had been settled to his satisfaction, and Dale accepted his orders. He was to command a small fleet assigned to protect American merchant ships in the Mediterranean Sea. American ships were no longer safe against the privateers of the North African nation-states.

=== Barbary War ===
During the First Barbary War with North Africa Commodore Dale sailed in the flagship USS President with Captain James Barron and a fleet of four other ships. In 1801, President Thomas Jefferson assigned them to blockade the city of Tripoli, where government-sanctioned pirates seized European and American merchant ships and enslaved their crews. The United States government reluctantly paid tribute to the leaders of Tripoli, Tunis and Algiers for a number of years to ensure the protection of American interests. Regardless, the Barbary pirates continued to sporadically seize American property and sailors. During the years 1801 and 1802, while Dale and his fleet regulated these waters, American ships remained unthreatened. Dale maintained the blockade until a lack of provisions and rampant illness among the crews of his ships compelled him to return to his base in Virginia.

Dale received new orders to return to the Mediterranean after his return to the States; however, he was dissatisfied with the conditions of his assignment. He resigned his commission in the United States Navy when he discovered that there would be no captain on his flagship. He considered it a dishonor for him to assume the responsibilities of a captain while serving as a commodore. Instead. he returned to Philadelphia as a civilian, and lived the remainder of his life on land, with his wife and family.

== Retirement and death ==
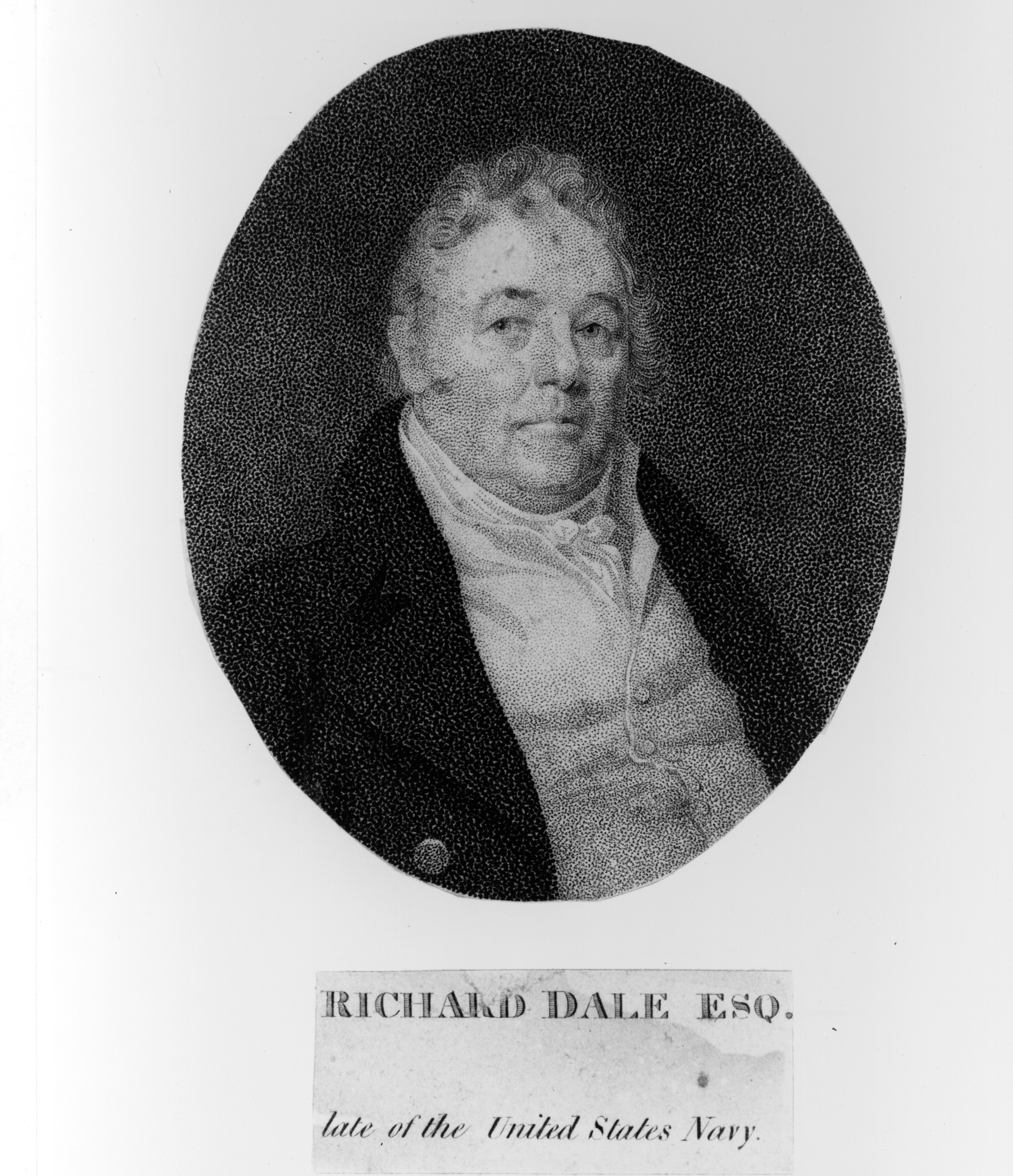
Dale pictured in his older years

Dale had done well for himself as a merchant seaman. Upon his return to Philadelphia, he changed the focus of his career and became a director of the Insurance Company of North America. Six months later, he shifted allegiance to the Union Insurance Company, and remained there as one of its directors for over twenty years. He served as its president from September 1824 to July 1825.

Back in 1785, George Washington signed a certificate that admitted Dale into the Society of the Cincinnati, which honored officer veterans of the Revolutionary War. Dale remained an active member for the rest of his life, and became involved in the effort to construct a monument dedicated to George Washington in Philadelphia, which ultimately never materialized. He was also active in the Society for the Relief of Poor and Distressed Masters of Ships, Their Wives and Children (est. 1765), and served in the Washington Benevolent Society of Pennsylvania. During the War of 1812, he was a member of the General Committee, formed to protect Philadelphia from potential attack by the British military.

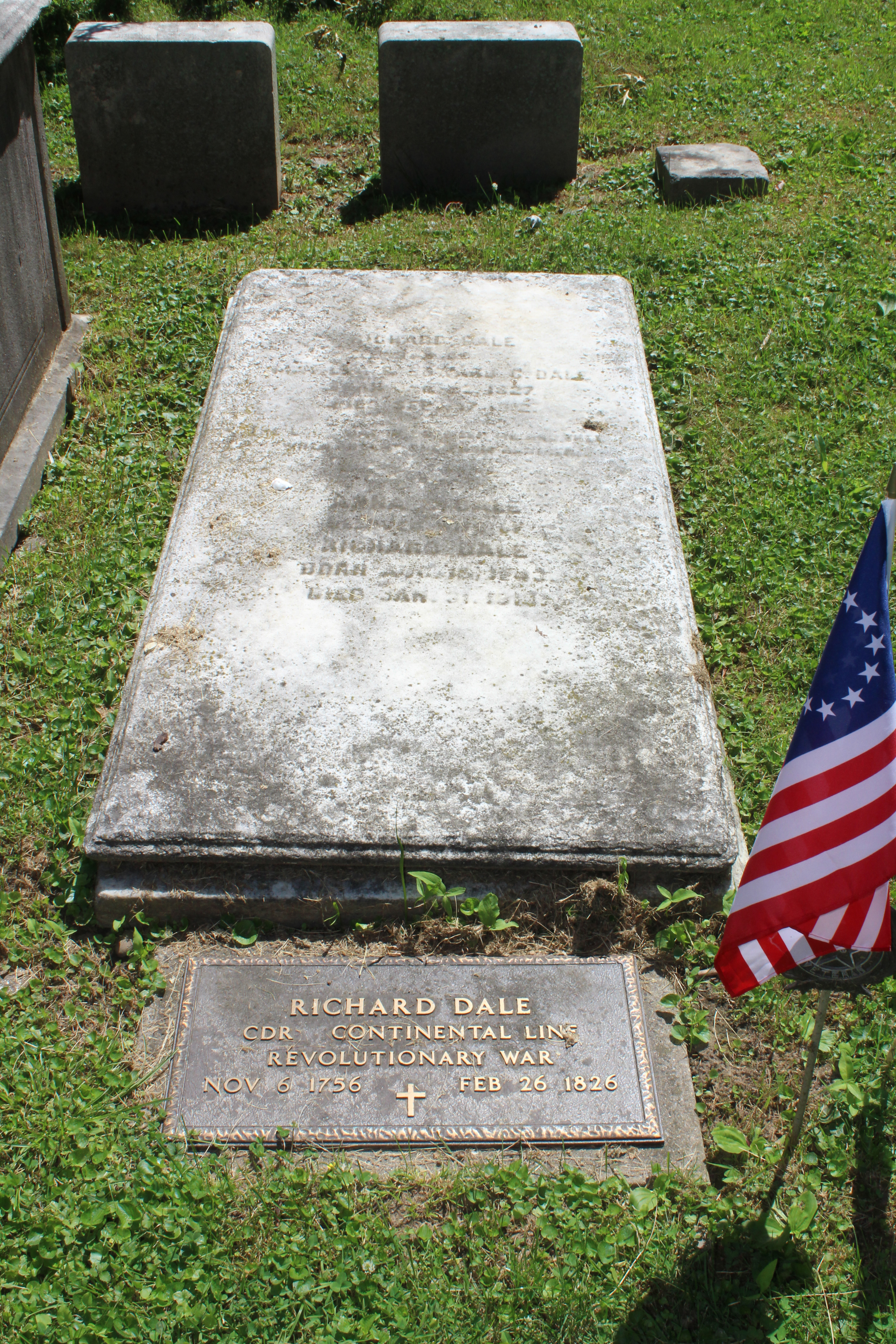
Richard Dale tombstone in Laurel Hill Cemetery

A Protestant Episcopalian, he devoted himself to the religious affairs of the church in Philadelphia. In 1816, he served as president of the Marine Bible Association of the City of Philadelphia, founded by the Philadelphia Bible Society with the intention to further the spiritual welfare of American merchant seamen. He was a co-founder of the Mariner's Church, a non-denominational church located right off the docks of the city port to cater to traveling seamen. Designed by William Strickland, it was one of the largest churches in the city at the time. He also served as a member of the Standing Committee of the Diocese, a Trustee of the Episcopate Fund, and participated in various conventions dedicated to the perpetuation of the Episcopalian message. He closely followed the construction and affairs of the St. Stephens Church in Philadelphia during its construction and until his death. Dale was sixty-nine when he died in Philadelphia. Originally laid to rest in the Christ Church Burial Ground, and followed by Dorethea with her death four years later, they were both reinterred in the Laurel Hill Cemetery in 1888.

== Children ==
- Mary Dale – September 6, 1792 to August 7, 1793
- Richard Dale Jr. – January 2, 1795 to 1815. Dale Sr. used his not insubstantial influence within the United States Department of the Navy to get both Dale Jr. and his brother John Montgomery positions within the Navy, with the caveat that they serve on different ships. Dale Jr. served aboard his father's former command, President, during the War of 1812, when he was involved in a battle with a squadron of Royal Navy ships off the coast of Bermuda. Struck by a cannonball that severed his leg, he later died as a prisoner on the island.
- John Montgomery Dale – January 4, 1797 to December 15, 1852. Served as a captain within the United States Navy, and eventually dedicated the sloop-of-war USS Dale, which was named in honor of his father.
- Samuel Sutherland Dale – 1799 (died an infant)
- Edward Crathorne Dale – February 21, 1801 to December 18, 1868.
- Sarah Barry Dale – January 14, 1804 to March 6, 1839
- Ann Dale – 1806 (died an infant)
- Elizabeth Dale – September 21, 1807 to ???

== Ships ==
During the course of his career, Dale served on many different ships under a variety of national flags and in various capacities. His final mission, in the capacity of Commodore of the United States Navy, found him serving at the head of a small fleet of ships. Many of the ships upon which Dale served are as follows:

- Unidentified vessel commanded by an uncle – 1768. During his preliminary career on merchant vessels, Dale began as an apprentice and rose to the rank of chief mate, working largely in the West Indies trade.
- Unidentified light cruiser in the service of Virginia – 1776 (captured by the British)
- Lady Susan – 1776. A British vessel on which he served during the Revolution
- Lexington – 1776, 1777. Served as a midshipman under John Barry, Master's Mate under William Hallock, 1776, again after capture and release in 1777, under a new captain, Henry Johnston
- Bonhomme Richard – 1779. Served as First Lieutenant under John Paul Jones in this French privateer
- Alliance – 1779. First Lieutenant under Jones
- Ariel – 1780–1781. First Lieutenant under Jones
- Trumbull – July to November, 1781. First Lieutenant under Captain Nicholson
- Queen of France – Late 1781 or early 1782 – February, 1783. Served as first lieutenant initially, then as captain in this

privateer endorsed by the Continental Congress. Final vessel served on during the conflict with England. After this, he was discharged from the Continental Navy

- Chesapeake – 1784. As captain in the United States Navy, he was responsible for the ship's construction, although he did not sail in it.
- Canton – 1785–1787. The first merchant vessel out of the United States used for the China trade
- Alliance – 1787–1788. Modified since the war to become a merchant vessel, again for the China trade
- Pigou – 1796. As captain, a merchant vessel used for the East India trade
- Ganges – pre-1798–1798. Dale commanded first as a modified merchant vessel, and again once she was converted into a war ship. Sailed in the latter capacity during the quasi-war with France.
- 1801–1802. Commanded a squadron including the President, (flagship), the Philadelphia, the Essex, and the Enterprise within the Mediterranean Sea, protecting American merchant vessels against Tripolitan and other Barbary privateers.

== Namesakes ==
See USS Dale for a list of ships named in his honor.

== See also ==
- Bibliography of early American naval history

== Sources ==
- Benham, Edith Wallace & Hall, Anne Martin, compiled:(1913)
  Ships of the United States Navy and Their Sponsors, 1797 – 1913 (Privately Printed, ___), pp. 227 Url
- Cooper, James Fenimore (1846). Lives of distinguished American naval officers:
  Bainbridge. Somers. Shaw. Shubrick. Preble.
  Carey and Hart, Philadelphia. p. 436. OCLC 620356. Url1
- —— (1842). Richard Dale. Published by author. p. 297. Url
- —— (1856). History of the navy of the United States of America.
  Stringer & Townsend, New York. p. 508. OCLC 197401914. Url
- Dorwart, Jeffrey M., The Philadelphia Navy Yard,
  (University of Pennsylvania Press, Philadelphia, PA, 2001), pp. 71.
- Hannon, Bryan, (1936) Three American Commodores,
  Spinner Press, NYC, NY, pp. 42–54.
- Homans, B., ed. (1839) The Army and Navy Chronicle, Volume VIII,
  B. Homans, Washington City, 1839, pp. 249.
- James, Hartwell, (1899) Heroes of the United States Navy,
  Henry Altemus Company; Philadelphia, PA, pp. 30–36.
- Keen, Gregory B.,(1913) The Descendants of Joran Kyn of New Sweden,
  Swedish Colonial Society; Philadelphia, PA,
- Longacre, James B. & James Herring, The National Portrait Gallery of Distinguished Americans, Vol. 3 (James Kay, Jun. & Brother, Philadelphia, PA, 1833), pp. 178–190.
- London, Joshua E. (2005). Victory in Tripoli: How America's War with the Barbary Pirates Established the U.S. Navy and Shaped a Nation. New Jersey: John Wiley & Sons, Inc. ISBN 0-471-44415-4.
- McGrath, Tim, (2010), John Barry, An American Hero in the Age of Sail,
  Westholme Publishing; Yardley, PA, May 2010, pp. 410
- Paul Jones, John, "Varieties," The London Magazine, (Taylor and Hessey; London, England, 1824) p. 269
- Peterson, Charles Jacob, The American Navy, Being an Authentic History of the United States Navy, (Jas. B. Smith & Co., Philadelphia, PA, 1857), pp. 137–146.
- Sears, Robert (1855). The remarkable adventures of celebrated persons: ..., etc., eminent in the history of Europe and America. Robert Sears, New York. p. 410. Url
- Seawell, Molly Elliot, "Richard Dale - One of the Bravest Men Who Ever Sailed," The Sunday Oregonian, June 2, 1895, p. 14.
- —— (1898). Twelve naval captains: being a record of certain Americans who made themselves immortal. Kegan, Paul, Trench, Trubner, & Co. Ltd, Ltd., London. p. 233. Url
- Simpson, Henry (1859). The Lives of Eminent Philadelphians, Now Deceased.
  W. Brotherhead, Philadelphia. p. 993. Url
- Toll, Ian W., Six Frigates – The Epic History of the Founding of the U.S. Navy, (WW Norton & Co.; NYC, NY 2006), pp. 128, 169–171.
- Vizetelly, Frank H., "Sleeps in Alien Soil," The Washington Post, July 9, 1905, p. B7.
- _____, "Commodore Richard Dale," Frank Leslie's Illustrated Newspaper, October 13, 1866, p. 61.
- _____, "New Ship Given the Name of a Hero," The Washington Post, September 15, 1933, p. F5.
- _____, "The Norfolk Navy Yard," The New York Times, June 16, 1895, p. 25.
