= Dale Watson =

Dale Watson may refer to:

- Dale Watson (FBI), former Assistant Director for the Counterterrorism Division of the FBI
- Dale Watson (singer) (born 1962), American country singer, guitarist, songwriter and author
- Dale Watson (ice hockey) from List of All-ECAC Hockey Teams
- Dale Watson (speedway rider) from 1986 Individual Speedway World Championship
