= Dotham, Missouri =

Extinct hamlet in northwest Missouri, U.S.

Coordinates: 40°20′07″N 95°14′11″W

Dotham is an extinct hamlet in Atchison County, in the U.S. state of Missouri. Dotham is a recognized locale in the USGS map-index for Missouri.

== History ==
A post office called Dotham was established in 1879, and remained in operation until 1902. The community most likely derives its name from the ancient city of Dothan. Dotham was the only business point in Dale Township.
