= Dale Marshall =

Dale Marshall may refer to:

- Dale Marshall (politician) (born 1963), Barbadian politician
- Dale Marshall (painter) (born 1974), British painter
- Dale Rogers Marshall (born 1937), American political scientist and academic administrator
