= Dale Brown (disambiguation) =

Dale Brown (born 1956) is an American novelist.

Dale Brown may also refer to:

- Dale Brown (basketball) (1935–2026), American basketball coach
- Dale Brown (boxer) (born 1971), Canadian boxer
- Dale C. Brown (born 1969), American urban survival and self-defense expert
