= Dale Martin =

Dale Martin may refer to:

- Dale Martin (scholar) (born 1954), American New Testament scholar
- Dale Martin (Ohio politician), former state legislator in Ohio
- Dale Martin (West Virginia politician), former state legislator in West Virginia
- Dale Martin (Canadian politician), former Toronto city councillor
- Dale Martin promotion, English wrestling promotion from 1952 to 1995
- Dale A. Martin (born 1957), Austrian-Hungarian businessman
