= Dale Wright =

Dale Wright may refer to:

- Dale Wright (singer) (1938–2007), American rock & roll singer
- Dale Wright (politician) (born 1950/51), member of the Missouri House of Representatives
- Dale S. Wright, professor of religion

== See also ==
- Dale Wright Award
