= Dale Mitchell =

Dale Mitchell may refer to:

- Dale Mitchell (baseball) (1921–1987), American baseball player
- Dale Mitchell (American football) (born 1953), American football player
- Dale Mitchell (soccer) (born 1958), Canadian soccer player
