= The Dales Open Space =

Nature reserve in Suffolk, England

Coordinates: 52.072°N 1.142°E

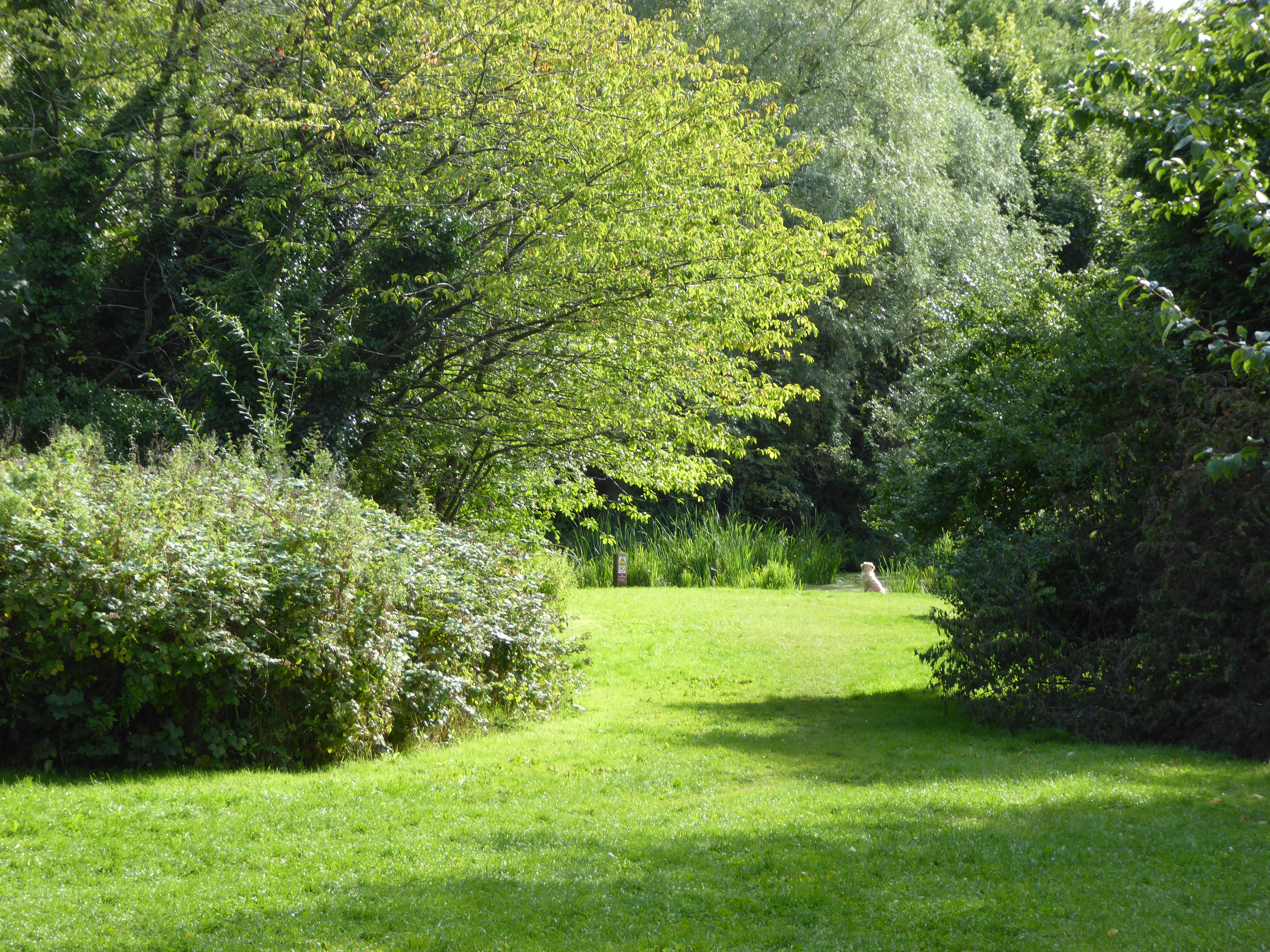
- Interactive map of The Dales Open Space
- Type: Local Nature Reserve
- Location: Ipswich, Suffolk
- OS grid: TM 154 462
- Area: 5.9 hectares (15 acres)
- Manager: Ipswich Borough Council

The Dales Open Space is a 5.9-hectare (15-acre) Local Nature Reserve in Ipswich in Suffolk. It is owned and managed by Ipswich Borough Council.

Most of this former quarry is secondary woodland, but there are also areas of scrub, two spring-fed ponds and seasonal pools. In the north the site is a flat valley bottom, and it slopes up steeply in the south.

There is access from Dales Road and Baronsdale Close.
