= Dale Watson (FBI) =

American former federal agent

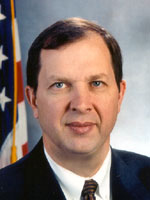
- Dale L. Watson
- Education: Florida State University

Dale L. Watson is an American former federal agent. He was the assistant director for the Counterterrorism Division of the FBI, as such he headed the FBI investigation into the September 11, 2001 attacks and the 2001 anthrax attacks.

== Education ==
Watson is a native of Central Florida. He graduated from Groveland High School before entering Florida State University where he graduated with a Bachelor of Science Degree in 1972. After college, Watson was commissioned as a regular U.S. Army Infantry Officer where he served five and one-half years.

== Early career ==
In February 1978, Watson received his appointment as a Special Agent with the FBI. He was first assigned to Birmingham, Alabama, and in 1982 he was transferred to New York City. In January, 1985, he was ordered to FBI Headquarters in Washington, D.C. He later was assigned a field supervisory desk at the Washington Field Office before returning to FBI Headquarters between 1991 through 1994 as Chief of the Iran Unit, Counterterrorism Section, National Security Division (NSD).

== Move to Kansas City ==
In May 1994, he was selected as the Assistant Special Agent in Charge of the Kansas City Division, where he served until June 1996. In this position he played a key role in the investigation into the Oklahoma City bombing. Watson was then named as the Deputy Chief of the Central Intelligence Agency's (CIA) Couterterrorism Center where he was instrumental in the successful investigation of the Khobar Towers bombing in 1996.

== Reassignment ==
In January 1997, he was reassigned to FBI Headquarters as the Chief of the FBI's International Terrorism Section, NSD, where he served until his appointment in July 1998, as the Inspector Deputy Assistant Director of NSD with responsibility for the FBI's Counterterrorism programs. In this capacity he oversaw the international investigations into the 1998 U.S. embassy bombings and USS Cole bombing.

== Later career and retirement ==
In 1999, Watson was promoted to be the first assistant director of the newly formed Counter-terrorism Division at FBI Headquarters by FBI director Louis Freeh. In December 2001 Watson was named executive assistant director for counterterrorism/counterintelligence.

Watson retired from the FBI in 2002 to join the Washington D.C.–based consulting firm of Booz Allen Hamilton.

== Testimony ==
- September 26, 2002, Watson testified before the Select Committee on Intelligence, United States Senate and the Permanent Select Committee on Intelligence, House of Representatives as the former executive assistant director, counterterrorism/counterintelligence.
- February 24, 1998, Watson testified before the Senate Judiciary Committee Subcommittee on Technology, Terrorism, and Government Information as the Chief International Terrorism Section, National Security Division regarding foreign terrorists in America.

== Quotes ==
- "I personally think he is probably not with us anymore but I have no evidence to support that."
  - Speaking of Osama bin Laden at a conference of law enforcement officials in Washington DC on July 17, 2002
- When asked whether he, as the FBI's former counterterrorism chief, knew any of the differences between Shiite and Sunni Muslims, Watson replied, "Not technically, no."
