= St. John's Evangelical Lutheran Church (Corning, Missouri) =

Historic church in Missouri, United States

- St. John's Evangelical Lutheran Church and Parochial School
- U.S. National Register of Historic Places
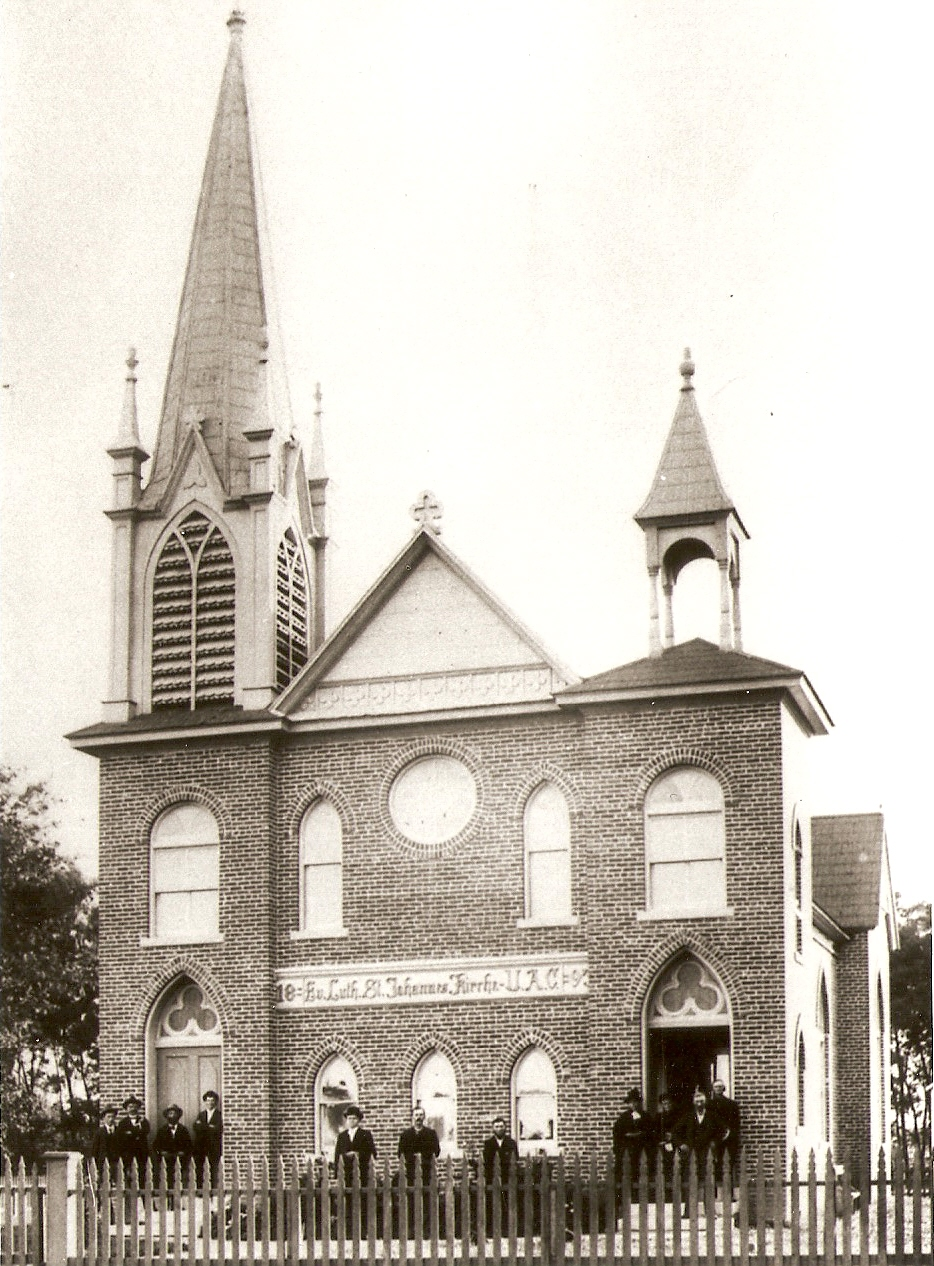
- St. John's Evangelical Lutheran Church circa 1894

- Location within Missouri Location within the United States
- Location: 112 Walters Street, Corning, Missouri
- Coordinates: 40°14′52″N 95°27′16″W
- Built: 1893
- Architect: Rev. John Proft; Peter Thull
- Architectural style: Gothic Revival
- NRHP reference No.: 07001339
- Added to NRHP: January 4, 2008

St. John's Evangelical Lutheran Church is an historic Lutheran church located in Corning, Missouri. It was founded as a Confessional Church, adhering to the Unaltered Augsburg Confession. It later became a member of the Lutheran Church–Missouri Synod (LCMS).

On January 4, 2008, it was added to the National Register of Historic Places as St. John's Evangelical Lutheran Church and Parochial School. In 2011, another flood of the Missouri River devastated the building, which is now in the possession of the St. John's Historical Society, which is currently in the process of restoring it.

== History ==
The congregation was founded as the "Deutsch Evangelish Lutheraner St. Johannes" by German immigrants to Northwest Missouri in the spring of 1860. This congregation built its first church structure, a wooden building nicknamed the "Church in the Timber," in October 1860 at Hemme's Landing next to the Missouri River, approximately two miles from Corning. By 1872, the congregation began outgrowing this structure and purchased the land in Corning on which the current structure now stands.

The current brick building was constructed in 1893 by Pete Thull of Rock Port, Missouri and has been in use ever since. The wooden, parochial, one-room schoolhouse was constructed behind the church in 1912. It held regular classes in German until 1917. The parish hall addition was constructed in 1953.

The church survived damage inflicted in the Great Floods of 1951 and 1993. It is currently awaiting restoration due to severe and long-term flooding in 2011.

== Description ==
The current brick structure was designed in the Latin cross design (complete with narthex, nave, transepts, and choir) and with pointed-arch windows, both characteristic of churches in the Gothic Revival style.

The stained glass windows were installed in 1943 and were made with blue glass from Czechoslovakia. They depict various Judeo-Christian symbols, including the Luther rose, an eagle in a boiling cauldron (both symbols for St. John), a crown of thorns, a throne, a Bible, and the Ark of the Covenant (among others).

The interior also houses the original hand-stenciled pipe organ and three murals (one of Christ the Good Shepherd, one of Jesus preaching at the Sea of Galilee, and one of Heaven). A white, wooden altar-pulpit with a large hand-made representation of the Kingdom of Heaven as it is described in the Book of Revelation rises 24 feet from the floor.
