= Dale A. Zimmerman =

American naturalist (1928–2021)

- Born: June 7, 1928; Imlay City, Michigan, U.S.
- Died: November 10, 2021 (aged 93); Silver City, New Mexico. U.S.
- Education: University of Michigan (BS, MS, PhD)
- Scientific career
- Fields: Biology; botany; lepidopterology; ornithology; zoology
- Workplaces: Western New Mexico University

Dale Allen Zimmerman (June 7, 1928 – November 10, 2021) was an American naturalist noted primarily for his contributions to ornithology, and, to a lesser degree, botany and lepidopterology. He was, at the time of his death, an emeritus professor at Western New Mexico University, and was best known for his 1996 field guide entitled Birds of Kenya and Northern Tanzania and his 2015 memoir, Turaco Country.

Zimmerman was born on June 7, 1928, in Imlay City, Michigan. He developed interests in birds, insects, and Africa during his childhood, and frequently visited the University of Michigan Museum of Zoology, drawn to birds specifically for their vibrant colors. In 1946, Zimmerman matriculated at the University of Michigan; he graduated from the university with B.S., M.S., and Ph.D. degrees in botany. His doctorate was completed in 1956 with the thesis The Jack Pine Association In The Lower Peninsula Of Michigan, with Elzada U. Clover as chair of the doctoral committee. Zimmerman received a faculty position in botany at Western New Mexico University (WNMU) in 1957. At the university, he taught courses on biology, ornithology, systematic botany, and zoology.

Zimmerman first visited Africa in 1961, and visited several times from then on. He retired from his position at WNMU in 1988, and in the same year became aware of his own macular degeneration. Birds of Kenya and Northern Tanzania, a field guide by Zimmerman and two coauthors, was first published in 1996 by Princeton University Press, the culmination of ten years' writing and illustrating. The authors had chosen to write the book after "lamenting that there were no books about birds in Kenya." An abridged edition was published three years later. In 2015, Sky Island Press published a memoir by Zimmerman entitled Turaco Country: Reminiscences of East African Birding, which detailed his over 20 trips to Africa conducted from 1961 to 1992. Birds of Kenya and Northern Tanzania was republished in 2020 under the Helm Field Guides series. Zimmerman's published books are part of his efforts to raise awareness of bird conservation efforts in East Africa.

During his lifetime, Zimmerman won several state and national awards, including the F.M. Bailey Lifetime Achievement Award from the New Mexico Ornithological Society and the Ludlow Griscom Award of the American Birding Association.

Following a stroke earlier in the month, Zimmerman died on November 10, 2021, in his Silver City, New Mexico home; he was aged 93 years old.
