= Dale Lewis =

Dale Lewis may refer to:

- Dale Lewis (footballer) (born 1969), Australian rules footballer
- Dale Lewis (ice hockey) (born 1952), Canadian ice hockey player
- Dale Lewis (wrestler) (1933–1997), American Olympic wrestler
