= Dale Turner (cricketer) =

Australian cricketer (born 1974)

Personal information
- Born: 30 January 1974 (age 52); Bankstown, New South Wales, Australia
- Source: ESPNcricinfo, 4 February 2017

Dale Turner (born 30 January 1974) is an Australian cricketer. He played two first-class matches for New South Wales in 2001/02 and eight List A matches for Queensland between 1999/00 and 2000/01.

== See also ==
- List of New South Wales representative cricketers
