= Corning, Missouri =

Unincorporated community and former village in Missouri, United States

- Unincorporated Community
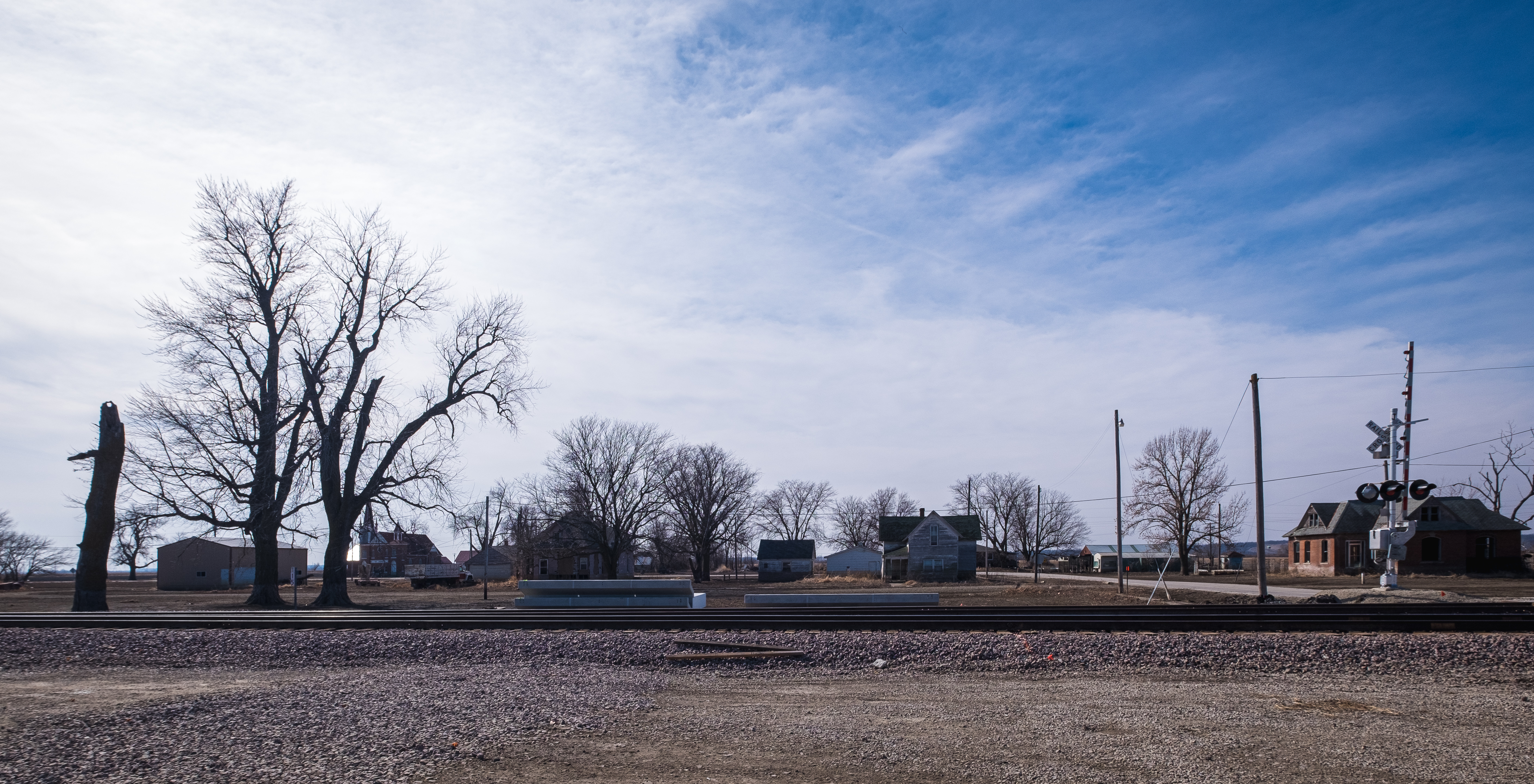
- Downtown Corning

- Location of Corning, Missouri
- Coordinates: 40°14′57″N 95°27′17″W
- Country: United States
- State: Missouri
- County: Holt
- Township: Lincoln

Area
  - Total: 0.11 sq mi (0.28 km^{2})
  - Land: 0.11 sq mi (0.28 km^{2})
  - Water: 0 sq mi (0.00 km^{2})
- Elevation: 876 ft (267 m)

Population (2020)
  - Total: 3
  - Density: 27.4/sq mi (10.57/km^{2})
- Time zone: UTC-6 (Central (CST))
  - Summer (DST): UTC-5 (CDT)
- ZIP code: 64437
- Area code: 660
- FIPS code: 29-16462
- GNIS feature ID: 2396661

Corning is a former village and virtual ghost town in Holt County, Missouri, United States. The population was 3 at the 2020 census. The population is estimated to be uninhabited as of 2025, effectively making Corning a virtual ghost town. Corning was dissolved and disincorporated in 2023.

The village is named for Erastus Corning, who owned sizeable shares of the Chicago, Burlington, and Quincy Railroad and who is the namesake of another Burlington railroad community Corning, Iowa.

== History ==
Corning was laid out in the fall of 1868 on main line of the railroad between Kansas City, Missouri and Council Bluffs, Iowa (the line remains active). A post office called Corning was in operation from 1868 to 1964, but changed its name to Corning Rural Station and continued until 1995. The plat for the town was filed on May 24, 1879.

From 1882 to 1980, a spur located southeast of town owned by the Burlington operated between Corning and Clarinda, Iowa initially under the name of the Tarkio Valley Railroad.

The village's St. John's Evangelical Lutheran Church was listed on the National Register of Historic Places in 2008.

Corning was impacted by the 2019 Midwestern U.S. floods. The village of Corning disincorporated in February 2023.

== Geography ==
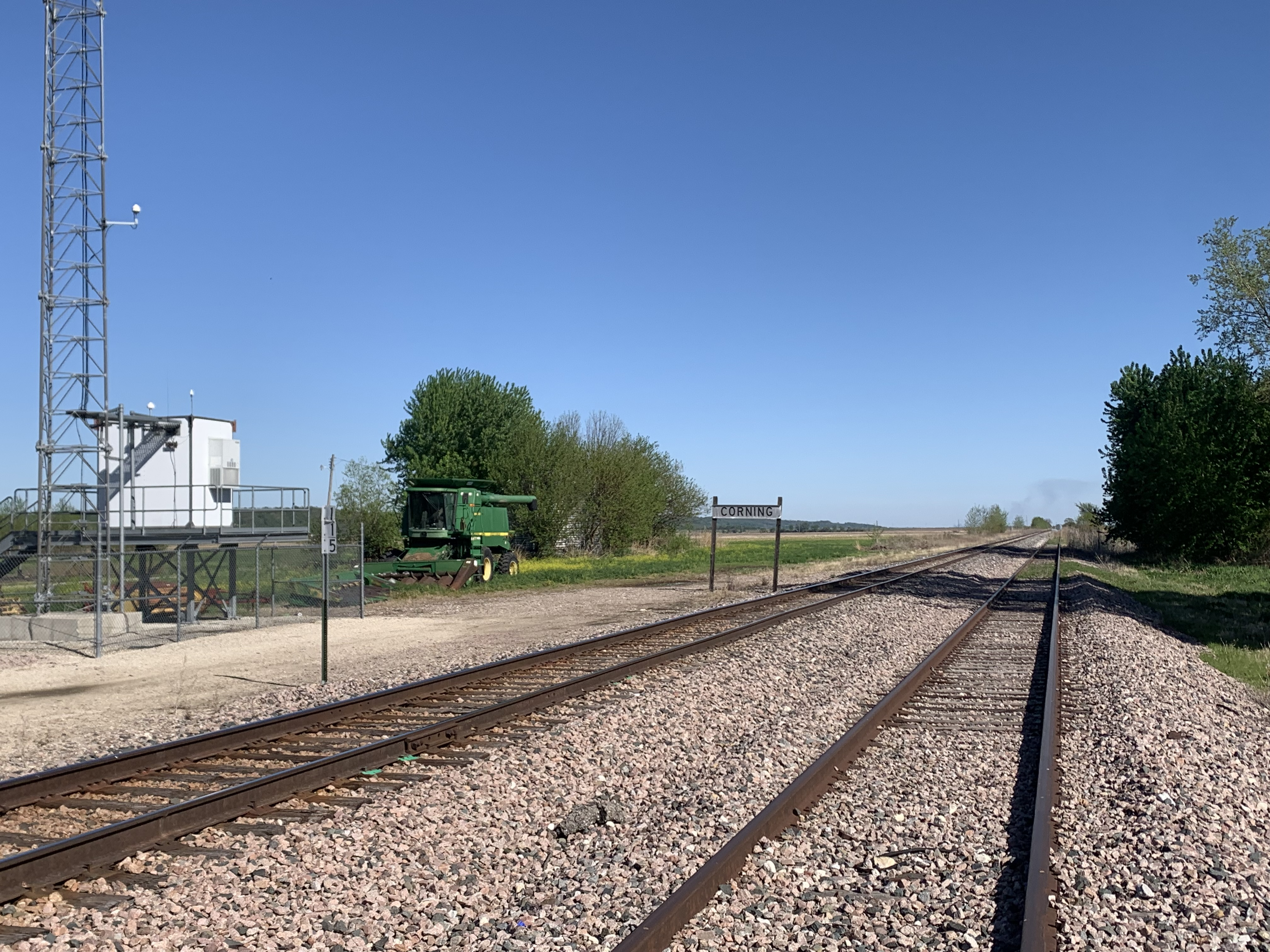
BNSF railway at Corning

According to the United States Census Bureau, the village had a total area of 0.11 square miles (0.28 km^{2}), all land.

== Demographics ==
Historical population
Census	Pop.	Note	%±
1880	221		—
1890	176		−20.4%
1900	240		36.4%
1910	253		5.4%
1920	255		0.8%
1930	214		−16.1%
1940	269		25.7%
1950	184		−31.6%
1960	128		−30.4%
1970	134		4.7%
1980	126		−6.0%
1990	88		−30.2%
2000	21		−76.1%
2010	15		−28.6%
2020	3		−80.0%
U.S. Decennial Census

=== 2010 census ===
As of the census of 2010, there were 15 people, 8 households, and 4 families living in the village. The population density was 136.4 inhabitants per square mile (52.7/km^{2}). There were 9 housing units at an average density of 81.8 per square mile (31.6/km^{2}). The racial makeup of the village was 100.0% White.

There were 8 households, of which 50.0% were married couples living together and 50.0% were non-families. 25.0% of all households were made up of individuals, and 12.5% had someone living alone who was 65 years of age or older. The average household size was 1.88 and the average family size was 2.25.

The median age in the village was 60.3 years. 0.0% of residents were under the age of 18; 6.7% were between the ages of 18 and 24; 6.7% were from 25 to 44; 60.1% were from 45 to 64; and 26.7% were 65 years of age or older. The gender makeup of the village was 40.0% male and 60.0% female.

=== 2000 census ===
As of the census of 2000, there were 21 people, 10 households, and 6 families living in the town. The population density was 188.9 inhabitants per square mile (72.9/km^{2}). There were 14 housing units at an average density of 126.0 per square mile (48.6/km^{2}). The racial makeup of the town was 100.00% White.

There were 10 households, out of which 40.0% had children under the age of 18 living with them, 60.0% were married couples living together, and 40.0% were non-families. 40.0% of all households were made up of individuals, and 10.0% had someone living alone who was 65 years of age or older. The average household size was 2.10 and the average family size was 2.83.

In the town, the population was spread out, with 23.8% under the age of 18, 9.5% from 18 to 24, 33.3% from 25 to 44, 23.8% from 45 to 64, and 9.5% who were 65 years of age or older. The median age was 39 years. For every 100 females, there were 90.9 males. For every 100 females age 18 and over, there were 100.0 males.

The median income for a household in the town was $23,750, and the median income for a family was $30,000. Males had a median income of $23,750 versus $14,583 for females. The per capita income for the town was $10,132. There are 25.0% of families living below the poverty line and 24.0% of the population, including no under eighteens and 100.0% of those over 64.
