= Dale Stevenson =

Dale Stevenson may refer to:

- Dale Stevenson (Canadian football) (born 1987), Canadian football offensive linemen
- Dale Stevenson (athlete) (born 1988), Australian athlete
