= Dale Anderson (footballer) =

English footballer (born 1970)

Personal information
- Full name: Dale Anderson
- Date of birth: 23 August 1970
- Place of birth: Newton Aycliffe, England
- Height: 6 ft 0 in (1.83 m)
- Position: Forward

Youth career
- –: Darlington

Senior career*
Years	Team	Apps	(Gls)
1987–1990	Darlington	18	(0)
1990–199?	Middlesbrough	0	(0)
–	King's Lynn		
–	Shildon		
–	West Auckland Town		
- * Club domestic league appearances and goals

Dale Anderson (born 23 August 1970) is an English former footballer who made 15 appearances in the Football League playing as a forward for Darlington in the late 1980s.

== Career ==
Anderson was born in Newton Aycliffe, County Durham, and began his football career in the youth system of nearby Darlington. He made his senior debut on 4 May 1987, away to Chesterfield in the Football League Third Division, at the age of 16 years and 254 days, which made him the club's youngest ever first-team player, a record he held for 21 years until it was broken by the 15-year-old Curtis Main. He made fifteen appearances in the league, but only three in the 1989–90 Football Conference championship season as manager Brian Little preferred to field more experienced players.

In June 1990, Anderson joined Middlesbrough, newly promoted to the Second Division, in exchange for defender Michael Trotter. He was signed with the intention of beginning his Middlesbrough career in the reserves, never broke through to the first team, and went on to play non-league football for clubs including King's Lynn, Shildon and West Auckland Town.
