= Dale Stephens =

Dale Stephens may refer to:

- Dale Stephens (footballer) (born 1989), English footballer for Burnley
- Dale Stephens (politician) (born 1959), American state legislator in West Virginia
- Dale J. Stephens, American writer
