= Dale, New York =

- Hamlet
- Location within New York Location within the United States
- Coordinates: 42°49′09″N 78°10′22″W
- Country: United States
- State: New York
- County: Wyoming
- Elevation: 1,201 ft (366 m)
- Time zone: UTC-5 (Eastern (EST))
  - Summer (DST): UTC-4 (EDT)
- ZIP code: 14039
- Area code: 585
- GNIS feature ID: 947997

Dale is a hamlet in Wyoming County, New York, United States. The community is 5.8 miles (9.3 km) north-northwest of Warsaw. Dale has a post office with ZIP code 14039, which opened on October 26, 1838.
