= Dale Roberts =

Dale Roberts may refer to:

- Dale Roberts (baseball) (1942–2010), relief pitcher
- Dale Roberts (footballer, born 1956) (1956–2003), Ipswich Town centre-half
- Dale Roberts (footballer, born 1986) (1986–2010), England C and Rushden & Diamonds goalkeeper
