= Dale Jennings =

Dale Jennings may refer to:

- Dale Jennings (activist) (1917–2000), American activist, playwright and author
- Dale Jennings (footballer) (born 1992), English footballer
