= Senator Dale =

Senator Dale may refer to:

- Charles M. Dale (1893–1978), New Hampshire State Senate
- George N. Dale (1834–1903), Vermont State Senate
- Porter H. Dale (1867–1933), U.S. Senator for Vermont from 1923 to 1933
