= Dale Sprague =

American politician

Member of New Hampshire House of Representatives for Strafford 18
- In office December 3, 2014 – December 4, 2018
- Succeeded by: Cecilia Rich

Member of New Hampshire House of Representatives for Strafford 2
- In office 2006–2012

Personal details
- Party: Independent
- Education: Franklin Pierce University

Dale R. Sprague is an American politician. He was a member of the New Hampshire House of Representatives from 2006 to 2012, and 2014 to 2018.
