= Dale A. Anderson =

American aerospace engineer

- Education: St Louis University; Iowa State University
- Known for: Computational Fluid Dynamics
- Scientific career
- Fields: Engineering

Dale A. Anderson is an American aerospace engineer, computational fluid dynamicist, researcher, author and professor. He pioneered research in computational fluid dynamics with his work at Iowa State University, alongside John C. Tannehill and Richard H. Pletcher. Anderson was the Professor of Aerospace Engineering, Vice President for Research, and Dean of Graduate Studies at the University of Texas at Arlington, United States. He is best known for his overall contributions to the field of computational fluid dynamics).

== Education and career ==
Anderson received his B.S. from St. Louis University in 1957, his M.S. in 1959 and Ph.D. in 1964 degrees in Aerospace Engineering from Iowa State University in Ames, Iowa.

He began his academic career as an assistant professor of aerospace engineering at Iowa State University in 1964 and was promoted to full professor in 1975. In the late 1970s, NASA assisted Iowa State University with a Computational Fluid Dynamics Center, one of seven such centers in the country, it was headed by Dale Anderson and assisted by John Tannehill, Richard Pletcher, Jerald Vogel, and Richard Hindman. The CFD Center was designed to coordinate research and interdepartmental course offerings. In 1980, The CDF Center won NASA recognition. Anderson, Tannehill, and Pletcher co-authored the textbook Computational Fluid Mechanics and Heat Transfer, originally published in 1984 but which came to be used by more than 90 schools and in 2020 published its fourth edition.

In 1984, he moved to the University of Texas at Arlington (UTA), where he was professor of Aerospace Engineering and held several administrative positions, including Vice President for Research and Dean of Graduate Studies. In 1986, Anderson was selected to receive the Saint Louis University Parks College Alumni Merit Award. He retired from UTA in 2005.

In 2006, Anderson was inducted into Hall of Distinguished Alumni at his alma mater, Iowa State University.

== Books ==
- Computational Fluid Mechanics and Heat Transfer, with John C. Tannehill, Richard H. Pletcher, Ramakanth Municipalli and Vijaya Shankar, 4th ed., Taylor & Francis, 2020.
