= Dale Thomas =

Dale Thomas may refer to:

- Dale O. Thomas (1923–2004), American wrestler and wrestling coach
- Dale Thomas (footballer) (born 1987), Australian rules footballer
