= Dale A. Martin =

Austrian-Hungarian businessman (born 1957)

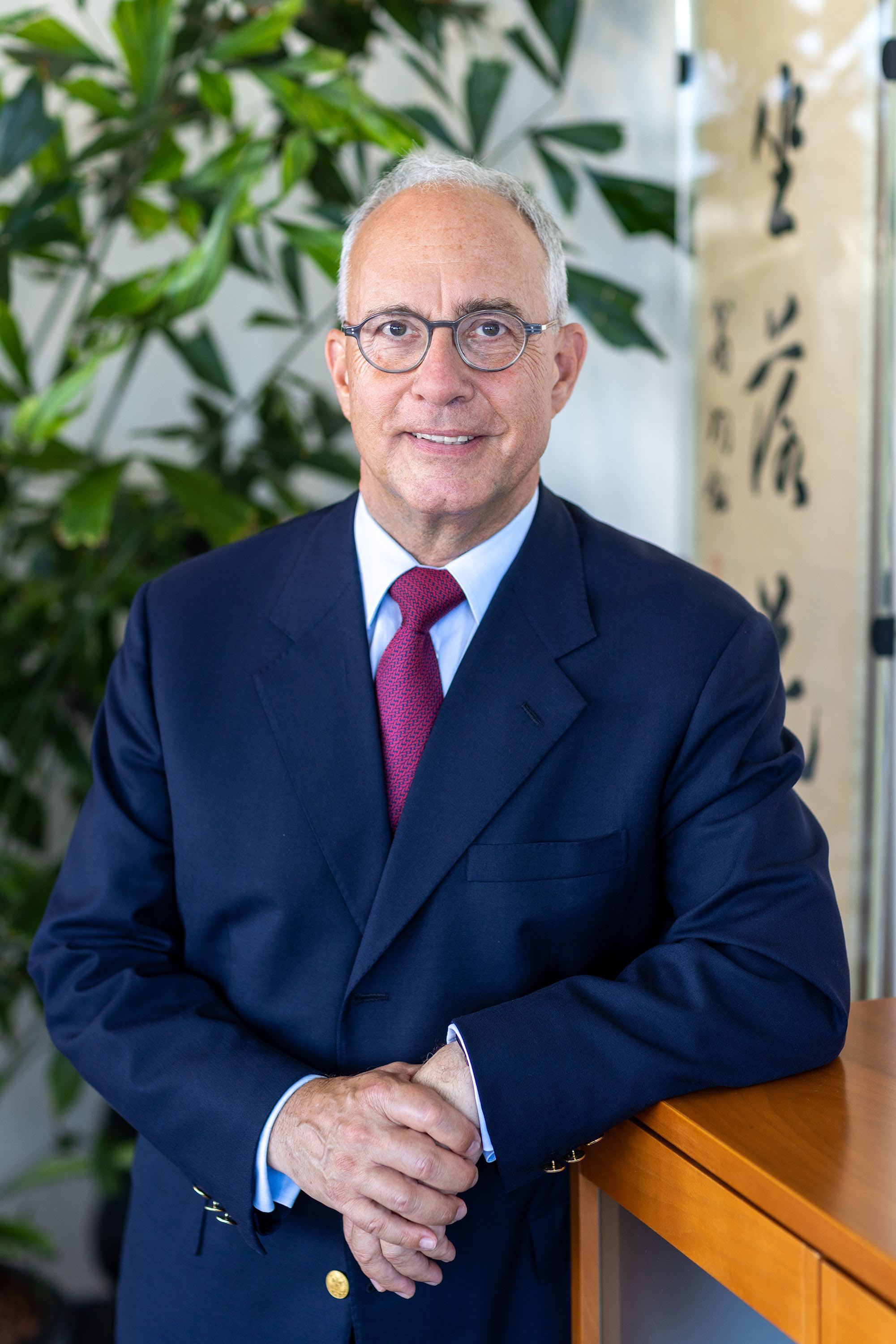
- Dale A. Martin in 2022
- Born: 1957 (age 68–69)
- Education: Vienna University of Economics and Business
- Website: LinkedIn

Dale André Martin (in Hungarian: Martin Dale András) born in 1957, is an Austrian-Hungarian businessman. He was president and CEO of Siemens Zrt. from 2010 until 2021. Since his retirement from Siemens, he has taken up the role of President of the European Engineering Learning Innovation and Science Alliance (EELISA).

== Education ==
He attended the Theresianum and Kalksburg College high schools in Vienna, and completed his Master's in social and economic studies at the Vienna University of Economics and Business. He also studied Mandarin at the National Taiwan Normal University.

== Career ==
Years	Position	Country
2021–present	President of EELISA	International
2010–2021	President & CEO/Member of the Managing Board Siemens Zrt.	Hungary
2004–2010	CFO/Member of the Managing Board Siemens s.r.o.	Slovakia
2000–2003	CFO/Vice-President/Representative Director Siemens-Asahi Medical Technologies Ltd.	Japan
1995–1999	CFO/Member of the Managing Board Siemens Rt.	Hungary
1991–1995	CFO/Co-managing director Siemens Telefongyár Kft.	Hungary
1989–1991	Deputy General Manager AWT Services Ltd.	Hong Kong
1988–1989	Area Manager for PRC, Taiwan and Korea AWT Trading Ltd.	Austria
1984–1987	Area Manager for Hungary, AWT International Trade and Finance Corporation	Austria

== Other Activities ==
Years	Position
2024–present	Supervisory Board and Audit Board member of Gedeon Richter
2023–2023	Supervisory Board member of MÁV-START Zrt.
2022–present	Supervisory Board member of Andrássy University Budapest
2022–present	Honorary Advisory Board member of the German-Hungarian Chamber of Industry and Commerce (DUIHK)
2019–2022	Board member of the German-Hungarian Chamber of Industry and Commerce (DUIHK)
2017–2021	Member of the Hungarian National Competitiveness Council (NVT)
2016–2020	Board member of the Hungarian Chamber of Commerce and Industry (MKIK)
2013–2019	President of the German-Hungarian Chamber of Industry and Commerce (DUIHK)

== Honours and awards ==
=== National ===
- Austria: Grand Decoration of Honour for Services to the Republic of Austria (2020)
- Germany: Cross of The Order of Merit of the Federal Republic of Germany (2023)
- Hungary:
  - Commander's Cross of The Hungarian Order of Merit (2021)
  - Officer's Cross of The Hungarian Order of Merit (2015)

=== Other ===
- Mercur Award of the Hungarian Chamber of Commerce and Industry (MKIK) (2022)
- Honorary Citizen (Civis Honoris Causa) of the Budapest University of Technology and Economics (2020)
- HIPA Personal Partnership Award (2020)
- German-Hungarian Friendship Award (Deutsch-Ungarischer Freundschaftspreis) of DWC (2019)
- Hungarian Economy Award (Magyar Gazdaságért Díj) (2014)
- Pro Facultate Award of BME's Faculty of Electrical Engineering and Informatics (2013)
