= Dale Wilson =

Dale Wilson may refer to:

- Dale Wilson (actor) (1942–2025), Canadian voice actor
- Dale Wilson (politician) (born 1953), Australian politician

== See also ==
- Dave Wilson (disambiguation)
