= Dale Murphy (footballer) =

Australian rules footballer

Personal information
- Full name: Dale Murphy
- Born: 4 September 1959 (age 67)
- Original team: Parkside
- Height: 183 cm (6 ft 0 in)
- Weight: 76 kg (168 lb)

Playing career^{1}
Years	Club	Games (Goals)
1979–80	South Melbourne	12 (0)
- ^{1} Playing statistics correct to the end of 1980.

Dale Murphy (born 4 September 1959) is a former Australian rules footballer who played with South Melbourne in the Victorian Football League (VFL).
