= Dale Clark Farran =

Dale Clark Farran is the Antonio and Anita Gotto Chair in Teaching and Learning and Interim Director of the Peabody Research Institute at Vanderbilt University. Her research includes the only randomized control trial of a statewide prekindergarten program.

Farran spent ten years with the Abecedarian Project, three years developing the Kamehameha School in Hawaii, and nine years working with the University of North Carolina at Greensboro before beginning her position with Vanderbilt University. Her primary research emphasis is on evaluating the effectiveness of alternative preschool curricula for preparing children from low-income families to transition successfully to school. She has published over 100 peer-reviewed articles and book chapters. Farran's work has contributed to the knowledge base on self-regulation skills development, mathematical reasoning and teaching strategies to facilitate greater math learning, using data to drive change in teacher behavior, and curricula and their impact on child achievement outcomes.
