= Dale Jones =

Dale Jones may refer to:

- Dale Jones (runner)
- Dale Jones (American football)
- Dale Jones (baseball)

== See also ==
- Shôn Dale-Jones, Welsh writer and performer
