= Depper =

Depper is a surname, being a variant of the surname Dipper. Notable people with the surname include:

- Dave Depper, American musician
- Martin Depper (born 1968), British racing driver and businessman
