= Dale V. Andersen =

American politician (1917–2004)

Member of the South Dakota House of Representatives
- In office 1977–1980

Personal details
- Born: March 2, 1917
- Died: May 15, 2004 (aged 87)
- Party: Republican
- Spouse: Evelyn
- Children: 3
- Education: Dakota Wesleyan University

Dale V. Andersen (March 2, 1917 – May 15, 2004) was an American politician. He served as a Republican member of the South Dakota House of Representatives.

== Life and career ==
Andersen attended Dakota Wesleyan University.

Andersen served in the South Dakota House of Representatives from 1977 to 1980.

Andersen died in May 2004, at the age of 87.
