= Dale Williams =

Dale Williams may refer to:

- Dale Williams (footballer) (born 1987), Welsh footballer
- Dale Williams (baseball) (1855–1939), Major League Baseball pitcher
- Dale C. Williams (died 1955), member of the California State Senate
- Win Williams (Dale Windell Williams, 1923–1992), American football end
