= Dale Munson =

American meteorologist

- Born: May 8, 1931; Red Wing, Minnesota
- Died: November 23, 2012 (aged 81); Omaha, Nebraska
- Occupations: Weatherman, announcer

Dale Munson (May 8, 1931 – November 23, 2012) (from Minnesota) was a former television and radio personality, best remembered as the chief meteorologist for WOWT-TV in Omaha, Nebraska from the 1960s to 1991. His 46-year broadcasting career also included work in Iowa and Minnesota, before he spent eight years as an announcer and classical music DJ for KVNO radio in Omaha.

During his time at WOWT, Munson saw at first hand the devastation caused by the 1975 Omaha tornado, which caused particularly serious damage to his own neighborhood. The following year Munson was the victim of a violent attack in the station's lobby, where a woman who had asked to see him stabbed his cheek and arm with a knife. The injuries required hospital treatment, and the attacker was temporarily institutionalized.

Munson retired in 1991, but he was chosen by NOAA Weather Radio to present a program on the Omaha tornado's 25th anniversary in 2000, and he has continued to appear at Omaha public events. He received a lifetime achievement award from the University of Nebraska at Omaha's Department of Communication in 2000, and was named a member of the Nebraska Radio Personalities Hall of Fame in 2004. Munson died of a heart attack on Thursday, Nov. 22, 2012 in Lincoln, Nebraska at the age of 81.
