= Dale Davis =

Dale Davis may refer to:

- Dale Davis (poet), American poet, writer, arts administrator and educator
- Dale Davis (basketball) (born 1969), American basketball player
- Dale Brockman Davis (born 1945), African-American artist, gallerist and educator
