= Dale Carr =

Dale Carr can refer to:

- Dale Carr (American football) (born 1964), American football player and coach
- Dale Carr (politician) (born 1954), Tennessee politician in the state House of Representatives
