= Cow Branch =

Stream in Missouri, U.S.

Coordinates: 40°22′21″N 95°24′12″W

Cow Branch is a stream in Atchison County in the U.S. state of Missouri. It is a tributary of the Tarkio River.

According to tradition, Cow Branch was so named on account of farmers letting their cows graze the area.

== See also ==
- List of rivers of Missouri
