= Dale Ferguson =

Dale Ferguson may refer to:

- Dale Ferguson (rugby league) (born 1988), English rugby league footballer
- Dale Ferguson (designer), Australian theatrical scenic and costume designer
