= Dale D. Murphy =

American economist

Dale D. Murphy is a professor in the Walsh School of Foreign Service at Georgetown University. He teaches international relations, international business, international economics, entrepreneurship, and corporate social responsibility in the Landegger Program in International Business Diplomacy. He serves on the board of Global Integrity. Murphy is the author of The Structure of Regulatory Competition: corporations and public policies in a global economy (Oxford University Press, 2004), which explains the impact of large corporations' preferences on public policies. He has authored various articles on international political economy and corporate social responsibility.

Before joining Georgetown University, Murphy was an assistant vice president at Citicorp. Earlier, he worked on long-term US-Soviet relations and Middle East national security policy for Secretary of State George P. Shultz in the Policy Planning Staff at the U.S. Department of State, and for the World Bank and U.S. Agency for International Development. He has also taught at Harvard University and the Massachusetts Institute of Technology.

Dale is currently a visiting lecturer at the Dubai School of Government. He specializes in Entrepreneurship and financial responsibility in developing markets.
