= Oswald, Missouri =

Extinct hamlet in northwest Missouri, U.S.

Coordinates: 40°16′07″N 95°14′21″W

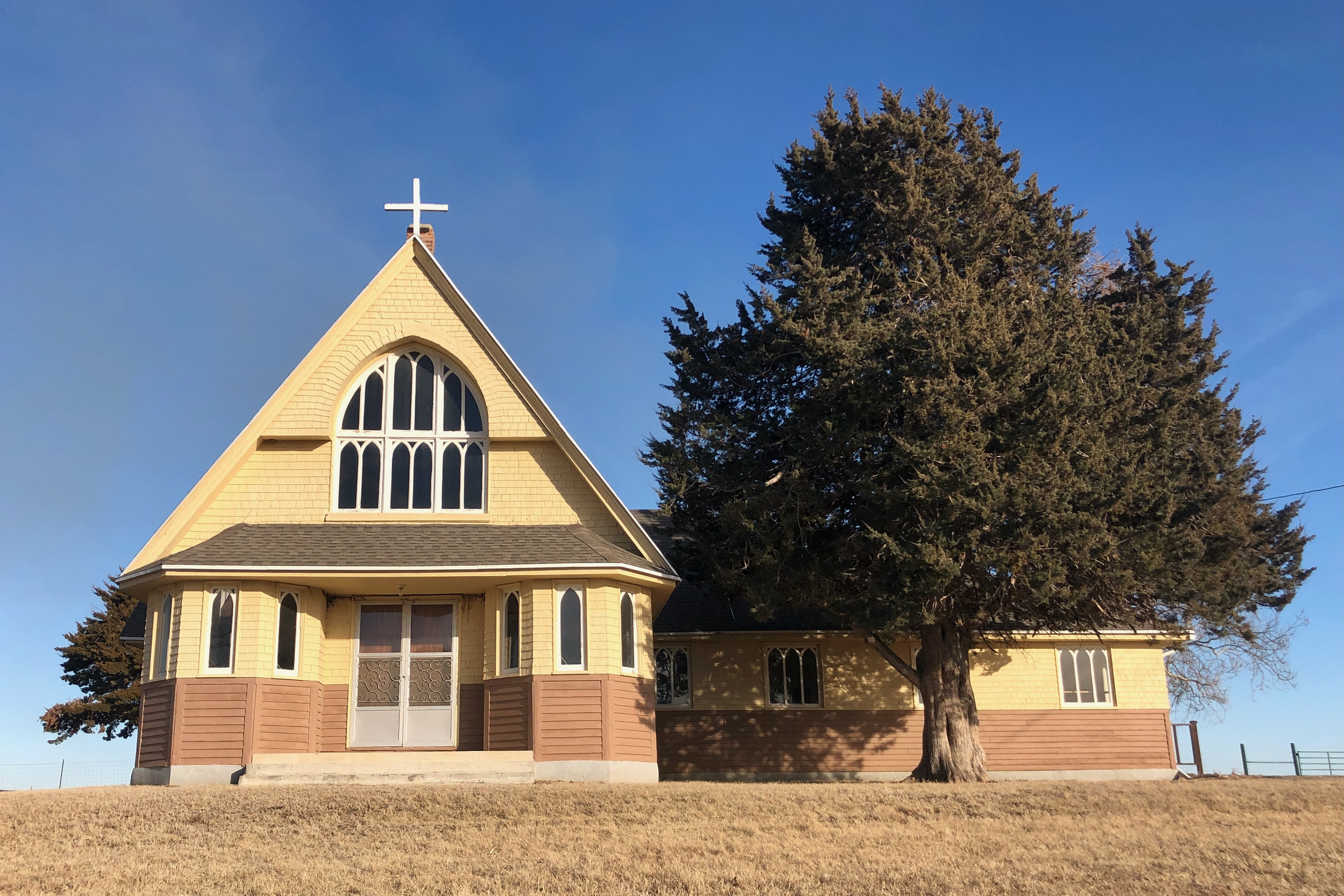
St. Oswald's Episcopal Church in southern Dale Township.

Oswald is an extinct hamlet in southeastern Atchison County, in the U.S. state of Missouri. The GNIS classifies it as a populated place.

A post office called Oswald was established in 1897, and remained in operation until 1901. The St. Oswald's Episcopal Church that is still in operation in the area since 1892, was built as a near replica of the church of the same name in Grasmere, UK. The families in the area that built the church are Tyson, Huggins, Close and Fleming. The descendants of these families are still farming in the area to the date of this publishing. Tyson and Close descendants currently own the ground that the Oswald post office was built upon five years after the St. Oswald's In-The-Field church, which is located 1/4 mile away. The area was named after the St. Oswald's church.
