= Dale Noelle =

American model and educator

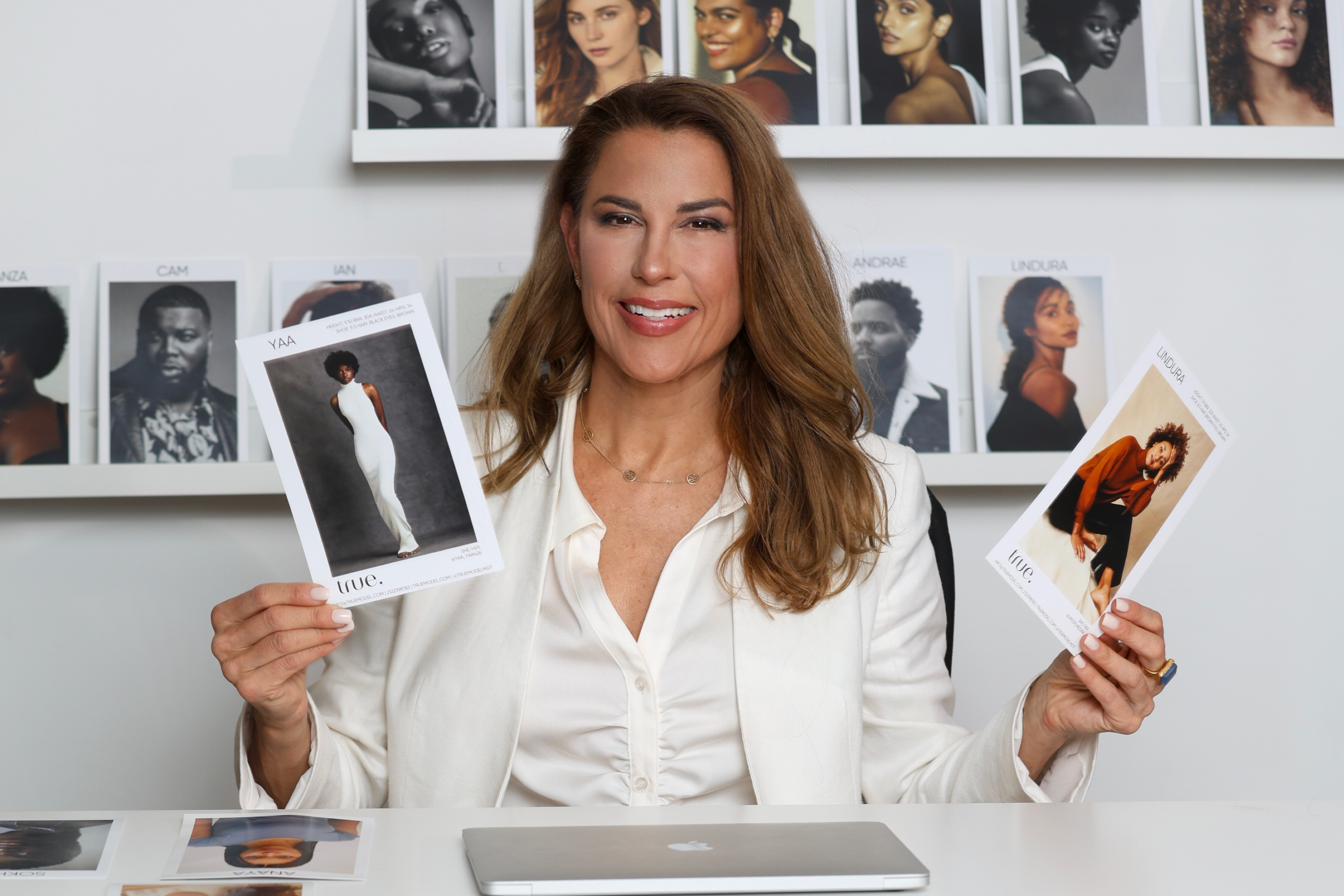

Dale Noelle is an American model and businesswoman, founder and CEO of True Model Management.

== Early life and modeling career ==
Noelle's interest in fashion began in childhood while spending time at her father's clothing factories. She later attended California State Polytechnic University and the University of South Florida, earning a business degree. She worked as a clothing production manager, as well as a sales representative, designer, and owner of a fashion clothing license before becoming a fitting model.

During her 20-year career as a model, Noelle worked for fashion brands and designers including Oscar de la Renta, Oleg Cassini, Michael Kors, Calvin Klein, Ralph Lauren, Donna Karan, Tommy Hilfiger, and Nicole Miller.

Noelle worked directly with the late Oleg Cassini to fit his final collection for David's Bridal, did fitting in Europe and Asia with Michael Kors, worked with Tommy Hilfiger and his financiers Lawrence Stroll and Silas Chou in Hong Kong for Tommy Hilfiger's first women's collection, and was Calvin Klein and Oscar de la Renta's fit model for many years.

After her career with Ford Models, Inc., Noelle began to manage her own modeling career in 2008. In December 2011 she started a full-service management company, True Model Management.

== Philanthropy ==
Noelle is a board member for Miss New York Blatantly Honest Foundation, and Sugar Loaf Film Festival. She is also a volunteer with Solving Kids' Cancer, and on the committee for TEDxYouth@HCCS.

She has been a member of The President's Circle for Fred Hutchinson, a group of donors providing funding towards cancer research and solutions. She has also sat on the Federal Enforcement Homeland Security Foundation and the TEDxFultonStreet Board of Advisors.

In addition to the above, Noelle is also an honorary committee member or host for various charities and event fundraisers including Women's Entrepreneurship Day at the United Nations, The Women Helping Women New York Luncheon and H.O.P.E. Foundation.

In 2013, Noelle launched TRUECares, the philanthropic arm of the company. TRUECares models donate a percentage of their earnings through TRUE to numerous organizations, and TRUE Model Management matches the donation percentage of each model.

== Personal life ==
Noelle's primary residence is in New York City and lives part-time in California.

== Media recognition ==
Noelle has been appeared in television, print, and online publications, including Bloomberg, Forbes, WWD, Fashionista, Morning Honey, Fashion Mingle, citybiz, 1010 WINS, Fox Business News, The Huffington Post, New York Times, New York Daily News, Worldwide Business with kathy ireland, New York Post, ABC News, "News 8" on WJLA-TV, "You & Me This Morning" on WCIU-TV, "San Antonio Living" on WOAI-TV, and "Let's Talk Live" on WTNH-TV.

== Other projects ==
Noelle holds a certification in Health Coaching and is an advocate for positive body image. She has experience in teaching yoga/fitness training and supports the National Eating Disorder Association (NEDA).

Noelle has been an instructor at Fashion Institute of Technology (FIT) - State University of New York, a board member of the Women and Fashion Filmfest, and creator of the organization's Girls' Empowerment Fashion Runway show. She also works with New York organizations to bring more clothing manufacturing to America.

Noelle was a panelist in the discussion with filmmaker James Belzer and Dennita Sewell, curator of fashion design at Phoenix Art Museum, at the 16th Annual Fashion Conference hosted by IAC (Initiatives in Art & Culture) at CUNY. Noelle highlighted the significant drop in domestic production and jobs as well as the importance of Education to train American workers to gain skills needed to produce more US-made products.
