= Dale Saunders =

Dale Saunders may refer to:

- Dale Saunders (singer) (born 1978), Saint Kitts and Nevis-born London-based soca and fusion music singer
- Dale Saunders (soccer) (born 1973), Trinidad and Tobago football player
- E. Dale Saunders (1919–1995), American scholar of Romance languages and literature, Japanese Buddhism, classical Japanese literature, and East Asian civilization
