= Dale Wright (singer) =

American singer

Dale Wright (born Harlan Dale Riffe; February 4, 1938 – April 15, 2007) was an American rock and roll singer and a radio and TV personality.

Wright was born in Middletown, Ohio. He started his career as a disc jockey in Dayton, Ohio who signed to Fraternity Records after playing a song he had written on the air. He recorded a sizable body of work for Fraternity in the late 1950s, some of it with backing band The Rock-Its, and hit the Billboard Hot 100 twice in 1958 with the singles "She's Neat" (No. 38) and "Don't Do it" (No. 77). By the early 1960s he had been dropped from Fraternity but continued recording for smaller labels well into the decade.

After his success as a singer waned, Wright worked for WBLG-TV (now WTVQ-TV) and WBLG (now WLXG) radio in Lexington, Kentucky, through the early 1970s. Afterwards, Wright hosted a talk show on WNVL in Nicholasville, Kentucky for 20 years before becoming program director at sister station WCKU. He died in Lexington, Kentucky, on April 15, 2007.
