= Dale Anderson (sportsman) =

Australian sportsman (1931–2021)

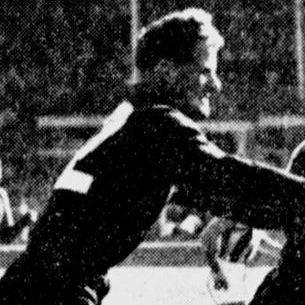

Personal information
- Full name: Dale Thomas Anderson
- Born: 10 June 1931; Latrobe, Tasmania
- Died: 29 September 2021 (aged 90); Burnie, Tasmania
- Batting: Right-handed
- Bowling: Right-arm fast-medium

Domestic team information
- Years: Team
- 1952/53–1963/64: Tasmania

Career statistics
Competition	First-class
Matches	6
Runs scored	123
Batting average	15.37
100s/50s	0/0
Top score	33
Balls bowled	940
Wickets	14
Bowling average	40.35
5 wickets in innings	0
10 wickets in match	0
Best bowling	3/49
Catches/stumpings	0/–
- Source: CricketArchive, 10 April 2023
Australian rules football career
Playing career
Years	Club	Games (Goals)
1953–1954	Melbourne	7 (15)
1956	Sorrento	10 (unknown)

Dale Thomas Anderson (10 June 1931 – 29 September 2021) was an Australian sportsman who played Australian rules football and first-class cricket.

Anderson played seven games for Victorian Football League club Melbourne during 1953 and 1954, kicking 15 goals. From 1952 to 1964 he appeared in a total of six first-class matches for Tasmania and took 14 wickets with his right-arm fast-medium pace bowling.

After leaving Melbourne during 1954, Anderson crossed to VFA team Williamstown and was full-forward in the premiership team of that year. He played 28 games and kicked 50 goals up until early in the 1956 season when he transferred to Sorrento FC. He kicked 22.15 in a game for Cooee against East Devonport in 1952 before coming to Melbourne.
