= Dale C. Brown =

American martial arts trainer

Dale Brown
- Born: 1969
- Height: 5 ft 9 in (175 cm)
- Weight: 240 lb (109 kg; 17 st 2 lb)
- Years active: 1990s

Other information
- Occupation: Founder and Director at Detroit Threat Management Center and Detroit Urban Survival Training (D.U.S.T.)
- Spouse: Mirela Brown
- Children: Indira Brown (daughter), Miles Brown (son), Kenan Brown (step-son)

Dale C. Brown aka Commander Dale Brown (born 1969 in Ann Arbor, Michigan) is an American urban survival and self-defense expert. He is best known as the founder of Detroit Threat Management Center, and Detroit Urban Survival Training (stylized as D.U.S.T.).

== Background ==
Brown is an army veteran who served as an Airborne Paratrooper in 1989. In the early 1990s, Brown relocated to Detroit, Michigan where he taught locals how to protect themselves. In the mid-1990s, he founded a community service based organization and bodyguard training program, Detroit Threat Management Center. The center's personnel are known as V.I.P.E.R.S which stands for Violence Intervention Protective Emergency Response System. In 2005, Brown mounted a mission to New Orleans where he spent many hours helping families and providing supplies during the first week of Hurricane Katrina. In October 2015, the Detroit Threat Management Center offered free self-defense courses for Emergency medical services (EMS) workers.

In 2020, Brown and his wife Mirela co-founded Detroit Urban Survival Training aka D.U.S.T, a self-defense school headquartered in Ferndale, Michigan. On December 13, 2021, Odell Beckham Jr. celebrated scoring a touchdown against the Arizona Cardinals during the Monday night football by performing some viral self-defense tactics made by Brown. In February 2022, Joaquin Buckley visited DUST to test the validity of Brown's methods, two weeks later of Buckley's visit, Buckley enlisted him as a cornerman for his UFC Fight Night 201. In November, mixed arts fighter Daniel James appeared in a video preparing for Bellator 288 with help from Brown. James later during an interview stated that he used the DUST tactic to escape a rear naked choke to win his fight against Tyrell Fortune. Dale was also mentioned in a MaxLevelIdot video "Fixing Btd Battles 2 Ft Ultra Jason" at around 4:32 into the video.

== Controversy ==
In December 2021, Swedish YouTuber PewDiePie uploaded a video on DUST, where he and another YouTuber reacted to Brown's tactics.

In January 2022, Tai Tuivasa announced that he was upset by Brown, and stated "Everyone wants to fight Jake Paul, but I want to fight this gammon." In March, Bas Rutten critiqued Brown stating "guys like that get people killed."

In January 2023, Sean Strickland first met Brown where he pushed Brown toward a display case in a gun store. In February 2023, Strickland commented below one of Brown's Instagram posts, stating "everything about this is wrong."

== Publications ==
- Brown, Dale C (2022-11-07). Detroit Urban Survival Chronicles. ISBN 979-8-218-08872-9.

== Personal life ==
Brown is married to Mirela whom he first met in 2010, she is a Bosnian immigrant. They have been married since 2013 and have three children; Indira Brown, Miles Brown, and Kenan Brown (step-son).
