= Dale Wood =

Dale Wood may refer to:

- Dale Wood (composer) (1934–2003), American composer, organist, and choral director
- Dale Wood (racing driver) (born 1983), Australian racing driver

== See also ==
- Wood Dale, Illinois, a city in Addison Township, DuPage County, Illinois, United States
