= Dale Marshall (painter) =

British artist

- Born: Dale Marshall; Bristol
- Known for: Graffiti, painter, artist

Dale Marshall (born 1974 in Bath, UK) is a contemporary fine art painter currently residing in the Welsh countryside at the foothills of Snowdonia National Park.

== Biography ==
Marshall began over 25 years ago as a graffiti artist on the streets of Bath and Bristol in the South West of England. With the freedoms of expression found through rebellion comes also the gritty consequences of street culture, which, for Marshall, ultimately led to drug use and psychotic episodes. In 1999, he was sectioned in St Lawrence's Hospital in Bodmin. He suffered clinical depression for another 7 years until he self-discharged from anti-psychotic prescription medication.

He completed a year studying abstract art at California State University, Long Beach, California in 2012.

In February 2014, a three-month exhibition of Marshall's work opened at the Herbert Art Gallery and Museum, Coventry. Marshall claimed this would make him the only other graffiti artist apart from Banksy to have a 3-month independent solo exhibition in a city museum.

== Exhibitions ==
Room101 - Bristol UK solo exhibition 2010 (Co Curated with Art El Gallery)

Anno Domini Gallery - Fresh Produce 2010 SanJose CA USA group 2010

Rook and Raven London UK group 2011

Anno Domini Gallery - Fresh Produce 2011 San Jose CA USA group 2011

Anno Domini Gallery - 'The California State Institution' San Jose CA USA solo 2012

LALA Gallery - LA Freewalls Inside Los Angeles CA USA group 2012

Soze Gallery - 'Best Kept Secret' Los Angeles CA USA solo 2012

The Royal Academy of Arts London UK group July 2012 Charity Exhibition. Benefiting 'Studio Upstairs'

Rook & Raven Gallery 'Coast to Coast' Duel with Daniel Lumbini Sept 2012

Herbert Art Gallery and Museum 'Walls With Wounds by Dale Marshall' 3 month solo Museum exhibition Feb 2014

Soze Gallery West Hollywood - 'Beauty in the wound' Los Angeles CA solo 2014
