= Hugh Dales =

English cricketer

Hugh Lloyd Dales (18 May 1888 – 4 May 1964) was an English first-class cricketer active 1920–30 who played for Middlesex. He was born in Medomsley; died in Whitley Bay.
