= Dale Deppe =

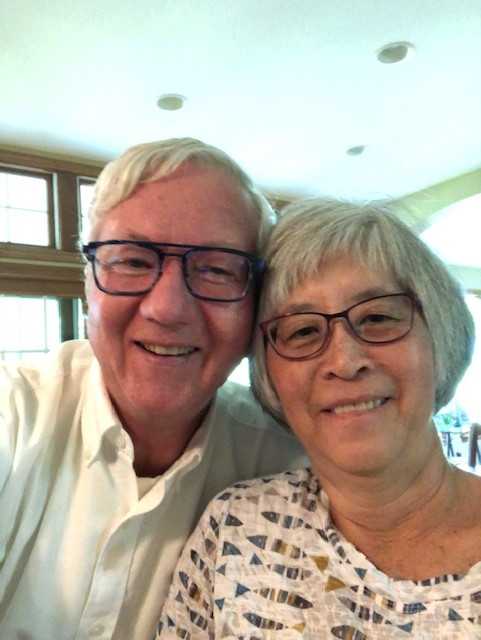
Dale and Liz Deppe – 2019

Dale Deppe is an American horticulture industry innovator of proprietary woody plants. Deppe has received numerous awards in various organizations within the woody plant industry.

Dale and his wife Liz Deppe founded Spring Meadow Nursery in 1981. Spring Meadow Nursery is located in Grand Haven, Michigan US and is one of the largest providers of "proprietary" plant materials in North America In 2004, Spring Meadow joined with Proven Winners as their exclusive woody plant licensee to select, develop, distribute, and market Proven Winners ColorChoice Shrubs.

== Early life ==
Dale Deppe's ancestors were Dutch and immigrated to West Michigan. The Dutch established a rich tradition for horticulture. Deppe got his start working with plants by picking onions. He found out about a job at Arthur L. Watson Nursery and started working there at age 14. Jim, a local botany teacher, worked at the nursery and mentored Deppe and two of his friends.

“He took me and my friends under his wing and treated us as students,” Dale Deppe said in an interview with Green House Management Magazine. “Jim loved plants and he just couldn’t stop himself from being a teacher. He was passionate about the nursery business and he passed it on to us.”

He pursued that interest further and graduated with a horticulture degree from Michigan State University in 1971.

== Spring Meadow Nursery ==
After graduating from Michigan State, he worked as a contractor for Zelenka Nurseries in Grand Haven. In those days, Zelenka was a large nursery. Deppe farmed a 20-acre tract he owned. He took retail-ready shrubs and potted them and shipped them to Zelenka’s dock.

He said to Green House Management Magazine, “I was an energetic young man, working night and day on both jobs and the market was good,” he says. “I built a house on the 20 acres, brought my first crop to Zelenka and bought another 40 acres down the road thinking I’d do more contract growing.”

He worked with Zelenka for 11 years. He bought forty additional acres. Three months after closing on those forty acres, Zelenka discontinued their arrangement and Deppe had to move on to something else. They sold the forty acres, Liz got a job and Deppe began selling plants.

Spring Meadow Nursery was born. The year was 1981.

== Contributions to the woody plant industry ==
Since the 1980s, Deppe played a role in developing and marketing a business model for proprietary woody plants. Before that time, few plants were developed for their hardy genetics.

He prioritized the hunting of woody plants with excellent genetics. He hired a horticulturist, plant breeder and plant hunter named Tim Wood to travel around the globe to find excellent plants.

Jeremy Deppe, his son (General Manager of Spring Meadow) was quoted in Green House Management magazine as saying, “Dale was instrumental in driving the push into branding as a way to differentiate from commodities,” Jeremy says. “Branding has provided a way for each part of the supply chain to add value and introducing new varieties has made gardening easier for consumers.”

Green House Magazine interviewed Deppe on what he thought his contributions to the Woody Plant Industry entailed. He focused on how the new business plan for woody plants (shrubs, vines, and trees) allowed for branding and marketing for better customer service.

== Personal life ==
Dale Deppe is married to Liz Deppe and they have a son, Jeremy working in their business as the General Manager.

== Horticulture awards ==
=== MNLA Grower of the Year – 1995 ===
Presented by the Michigan Nursery and Landscape Association (MNLA). To be a recipient of the MNLA Grower of the Year Award a grower must exhibit excellence in the areas of growing plant materials, contributions to the Green Industry and the MNLA, and should set a standard of professionalism for all to follow.

=== IPPS Fellow Award – 1999 ===
The Fellow Award was created to acknowledge outstanding members of the International Plant Propagators Society (IPPS), Eastern Region North America, who have contributed to the advancement of the IPPS Eastern Region and to the field of Plant Propagation and Production. This recognition is for contributions to the IPPS through participation, service, leadership, research, teaching or extension work.

=== IPPS Award of Merit – 2008 ===
The Award of Merit is the highest honor that IPPS-ER can award to its members for outstanding contributions to the organization and to plant propagation and production. The Award of Merit recipient is recognized for significant contributions to plant propagation or production in one or more of the following areas: 1) scientific discovery or application of facts to the propagation or production of plants; 2) development of new plant propagation or production practices or techniques; 3) services rendered to the science and practice of plant propagation or production; 4) extraordinary service to the Society.

=== IPPS International Award of Honour – 2010 ===
Presented by the International Plant Propagators Society (IPPS) Directors of the International Board to acknowledge exceptional and distinguished service to the Society and its members. IPPS honors an active member of the Society at the conference of the region hosting the international tour and International Board of Directors' meeting each year.

=== Scott Medal and Award – 2016 ===
Scott Arboretum of Swarthmore College made Dale Deppe the 2016 Scott Medal and Award recipient. "The award is given annually to an individual, organization or corporate body who, in the opinion of the Selection Committee, has made an outstanding national contribution to the science and the art of gardening"

=== Jackson Dawson Memorial Award – 2018 ===
The Jackson Dawson Memorial Award was presented by The Massachusetts Horticultural Society. This award is given for exceptional skill in the science or practice of hybridization or propagation of hardy, woody plants. Jackson Thornton Dawson raised more than 450,000 plants during his 43 years as propagator and superintendent of the Arnold Arboretum of Harvard University.

=== Horticulture Industry Leadership Award – 2019 ===
The Horticultural Industries Leadership Awards (HILAs), is the only national awards program to honor leaders from the greenhouse and nursery industries. Deppe received the award in honor of his significant contributions to the horticulture industry through innovation and expertise and environmental stewardship, and for enhancing the lives of employees, customers, communities, and the industry at large through charitable giving.

=== Western Legend Award – 2019 ===
Western Legend Award was given to Deppe from Western Nursery & Landscape Association (WNLA). The Western Legend Award recognizes a lifetime of sustained and significant professional achievement and public service to the green industry.
