= USS Dale =

USS Dale may refer to:

- USS Dale (1839), was a sloop-of-war, launched in 1839 and transferred to the Maryland Naval Militia in 1895
- USS Dale (DD-4), was a Bainbridge-class destroyer, launched in 1900 and struck in 1919
- USS Dale (DD-290), was a Clemson-class destroyer, launched in 1919 and struck in 1930
- USS Dale (DD-353), was a Farragut-class destroyer, launched in 1935 and struck in 1945
- USS Dale (DLG-19), was a Leahy-class guided-missile destroyer leader, launched in 1962, reclassified as (CG-19) in 1975 and struck in 1994
