= Dallas (disambiguation) =

Dallas is a large city in Texas, United States.

Dallas may also refer to:

== Places ==
=== Canada ===
- Dallas, Kamloops, British Columbia, a neighbourhood of the city of Kamloops
- Dallas Road, an important thoroughfare in Victoria, British Columbia
- Dallas/Red Rose, Manitoba, a small town

=== United States ===
- Dallas, Texas
- Dallas, Arkansas
- Dallas, Colorado
- Dallas, Georgia
- Dallas, Iowa
- Dallas, Missouri, an extinct hamlet
- Dallas, North Carolina
- Dallas, Oregon
- Dallas, Pennsylvania
- Dallas, South Dakota
- Dallas, West Virginia
- Dallas (town), Wisconsin
  - Dallas, Wisconsin, a village within the town
- Dallas Plantation, Maine
- Marble Hill, Missouri, formerly Dallas
- Bethany, Missouri, formerly Dallas
- Dallas City, Illinois

=== Elsewhere ===
- Dallas, Moray, Scotland
- Dallas, Victoria, Australia

== Naval vessels ==
- USS Dallas, the name of two commissioned and two cancelled ships
- USCGC Dallas, the name of various United States Coast Guard and United States Revenue Cutter Service ships

== People ==
- Dallas (name), a given name and surname
- Dallas, a female professional wrestler from the Gorgeous Ladies of Wrestling
- Dallas, a member of the TV show American Gladiators

== Arts and entertainment ==
=== Films ===
- Dallas (film), a 1950 Warner Bros. Western
- Dallas (Alien), the captain of the Nostromo in the 1979 movie Alien

=== Music ===
- Dallas Records, a Croatian record label
- Dallas (album), a 2002 album by Randy Meisner
- "Dallas" (Connie Smith song), a 1974 country music song by Connie Smith
- "Dallas" (Alan Jackson song), a 1991 country music song by Alan Jackson
- "Dallas" (Steely Dan song), the first single of jazz-rock band Steely Dan
- "Dallas", a song from Jimmy Buffett's 1974 album A1A
- "Dallas", a song from Joe Ely's 1981 album Musta Notta Gotta Lotta
- "Dallas", a song from the Silver Jews' 1996 album The Natural Bridge

=== Television ===
- Dallas (TV series), a 1978–1991 American prime-time soap opera
- Dallas (2012 TV series), a 2012–2014 revival of the 1978 series
- Dallas, a recurring minor character in the American family sitcom Austin & Ally
- Dallas Royce, a character in the American TV series Suburgatory

=== Other uses ===
- Dallas (role-playing game), a 1980 role-playing game based on the TV show
- The Umbrella Academy: Dallas, the second volume of The Umbrella Academy comic book series

== Other uses ==
- Dallas (jeep), a French car made from 1980s to 1998
- 8084 Dallas, an asteroid
- Dallas Semiconductor, now a subsidiary of Maxim Integrated Products

== See also ==
- Dalas (disambiguation)
- Dallas Divide, a high mountain pass in Colorado, U.S.
- Dallas Plantation, Maine, U.S.
- Dallastown, Pennsylvania, U.S.
- Dalles (disambiguation)
- Dellys, Algeria
- Fort Dallas, near Miami, Florida, U.S.
- Melcher-Dallas, Iowa, US, formed from merger the cities of Dallas and Melcher in 1986
