= USS Dallas =

One commissioned ship and one commissioned submarine of the United States Navy have been named USS Dallas. The ship was named after Alexander J. Dallas and the submarine after Dallas, Texas. Two other ships to honor the city were planned, but never completed.

- USS Dallas (DD-199), was a Clemson-class destroyer commissioned in 1920, in service during World War II, and scrapped 1946.
- A Des Moines-class heavy cruiser to be named Dallas (CA-140) was cancelled during construction in 1946. It was the only ship of her class to be so cancelled (three others were built and launched).
- Another intended Des Moines-class heavy cruiser Dallas (CA-150), was cancelled before start of construction in 1945. She was one of five ships in the batch cancelled before building began.
- USS Dallas (SSN-700), is a Los Angeles-class nuclear attack submarine commissioned in 1981, decommissioned in 2018.

== See also ==
- USCGC Dallas
- MV Dallas City was a British built transport ship launched in 1936 and sunk during an air raid in 1940.
- City of Dallas (ship) was a wooden, screw steam-ship built for Morgan Line in 1884 and used by Macheca Line until 1894; sunk 80 miles off Colón in 1896.
