= Doles =

Doles is a surname with several different origins, French, Czech, and Slovenian. As a name of French origin, it may be a habitational name derived from Dole in the Jura. As a name of Czech origin, the name is a variant of Dolejš meaning "lower". This was used to differentiate the bearers of the same personal name (example: for a man living in the lower part of the village, as opposed to another man in the higher part). Doles is considered by some to be a sept name of the Scottish clan Mackintosh, in this case the name is a variant of the surname Dallas.

== People with the surname Doles ==
- George P. Doles
- Johann Friedrich Doles
- John J. Doles Sr. (1895-1970)
- John J. Doles Jr. (1923-2004)
- Kurt Doles
- John Bemjamin Doles Jr (1922-1992)
- John Bemjamin Doles III (1955–Present)
