= Dallas (name) =

Dallas is a surname of Scottish and English origin, as well as a given name. When of Scottish origin the name is a habitational name, derived from Dallas near Forres. This place-name is likely derived from the British dol "meadow" + gwas "dwelling" (compare Gaelic dail + fas). This name also appears in County Londonderry, Northern Ireland. When of English origin the name is a habitational name, derived from the Old English dæl, or Old Norse dalr "valley" + hus "house". An example of such a derivation is Dalehouse in North Yorkshire. The name can also be a topographic name, derived in the same fashion.

== Surname ==
The surname, when of Scottish origin, is considered by some to be a sept of Clan Mackintosh.

- Alexander Grant Dallas (1816–1882), Canadian fur trader and official
- Alexander J. Dallas (statesman) (1759–1817), U.S. Secretary of the Treasury under President James Madison; father of George Mifflin Dallas
- Alexander J. Dallas (United States Navy officer) (1791–1844), U.S. Navy officer; brother of George M. Dallas
- Chad Dallas (born 2000), American baseball player
- Darcy Dallas (born 1972), Canadian ice hockey player
- DeeJay Dallas (born 1998), American football player
- DeVan Dallas (1926–2016), American politician
- Eneas Sweetland Dallas (1828–1879), Scottish journalist
- George M. Dallas (1792–1864), 11th Vice President of the United States of America (1845–1849)
- Hugh Dallas (born 1957), former Scottish football (soccer) referee
- Irene Dallas (1883–1971) and Hilda Dallas (1878–1958) were British suffragette sisters
- John Dallas (1878–1942), Scottish rugby union player and referee
- Josh Dallas (born 1978), American actor
- Karl Dallas (1931–2016), British writer, musician, and activist
- Leroy Dallas (1909–1967), American blues guitarist, singer and songwriter
- Matt Dallas (born 1982), American actor
- Robert Dallas (1756–1824), British judge
- Roderic Dallas (1891–1918), Australian fighter ace
- Rosalind Dallas (1949–2015), British graphic designer
- Sandra Dallas, American author
- Stuart Dallas (born 1991), Northern Ireland soccer player
- William Sweetland Dallas, British zoologist and curator
- Winifred Dallas-Yorke (1863–1954), Duchess of Portland

== Given name ==
- Dallas, a former ring name of professional wrestler Lance Hoyt (born 1977)
- Dallas Adams (1947–1991), actor
- Dallas Austin (born 1970), American songwriter, producer and instrumentalist
- Dallas Braden (born 1983), professional American baseball player
- Dallas Brodie, Canadian politician
- Dallas Frederick Burrows, birth name of Orson Bean (1928–2020), American actor
- Dallas Campbell (born 1970), British television presenter
- Dallas Clark (born 1979), professional American football player
- Dallas Comegys (born 1964), former professional basketball player
- Ryan Dallas Cook (1982–2005), ska trombonist
- Dallas Drake (born 1969), pro ice hockey player
- Dallas Eakins (born 1967), American ice hockey player and coach
- Dallas Frazier (1939–2022), American country musician and songwriter
- Dallas Goedert (born 1995), American football player
- Dallas Green (1934–2017), pro baseball player, manager and executive
- Dallas Green (born 1980), guitarist, singer and pianist of Alexisonfire and City and Colour
- Dallas T. Herndon (1878–1953), American author and historian
- Bryce Dallas Howard (born 1981), actress
- Dallas Johnson (born 1982), Australian rugby league player
- Dallas Keuchel (born 1988), American baseball player
- Dallas Long (born 1940), Olympic champion shotputter
- Dallas Loughridge (born 2004), Australian basketball player
- Dallas McKennon (1919–2009), American actor
- Dallas Moir (born 1957), Scottish cricketer
- Diamond Dallas Page (born 1956), American professional wrestler
- Dallas Reid (born 1993), American voice actor
- Dallas Reynolds (born 1984), American football player
- Dallas Seavey (born 1987), Iditarod musher
- Dallas Smith (born 1941), former pro ice hockey player
- Dallas Smith (born 1977), singer for the Canadian band Default
- Dallas Soonias (born 1984), Canadian volleyball player
- Dallas Taylor (1948–2015), an American session drummer
- Dallas Taylor (born 1980), vocalist for the band Maylene and the Sons of Disaster
- Dallas Turner (born 2003), American football player
- Dallas Thomas (born 1989), American football player
- Dallas Wiens (1985-2024), the first United States recipient of a full face transplant
- Dallas Willard (1935–2013), an American Christian philosopher
- Dallas Woods, an Indigenous Australian rapper

== Fictional characters named Dallas ==
- Korben Dallas, ex-soldier and unlikely hero cab-driver played by Bruce Willis in the movie The Fifth Element, set in the 23rd century
- Stella Dallas, title character of a 1923 novel and numerous subsequent theatrical, radio, and film versions
- Steve Dallas, a character in the American comic strips of Berke Breathed, most famously Bloom County
- Larry Dallas, Jack Tripper's best friend from the ABC sitcom Three's Company (1977–1984)
- Dallas, a character in the 1979 film Alien, captain of the starship Nostromo, played by Tom Skerritt
- Eve Dallas, the lead character in J.D. Robb's in Death series of mysteries
- Mike Dallas, character in Degrassi
- Dallas, a minor character in the 2001 science fiction horror film Jason X, played by Todd Farmer
- Dallas, recurring character in Austin & Ally
- Dallas Genoard, a character from the light novels and anime series Baccano!
- Dallas, a skilled criminal and one of the four playable characters in Payday: The Heist
- Dallas, a prostitute with a heart of gold, played by Claire Trevor in the 1939 film Stagecoach
- Dallas Gibson (Specter), a mutant character in Marvel Comics
- Dallas Winston, played by Matt Dillon, a “greaser punk” who “stays gold” in the 1983 Francis Ford Coppola film The Outsiders See also: Dallas Winston, a character in S. E. Hinton’s novel The Outsiders

== See also ==
- Dallas (disambiguation), other uses of Dallas on Wikipedia
