= USS Concord (1828) =

Sloops-of-war of the United States Navy

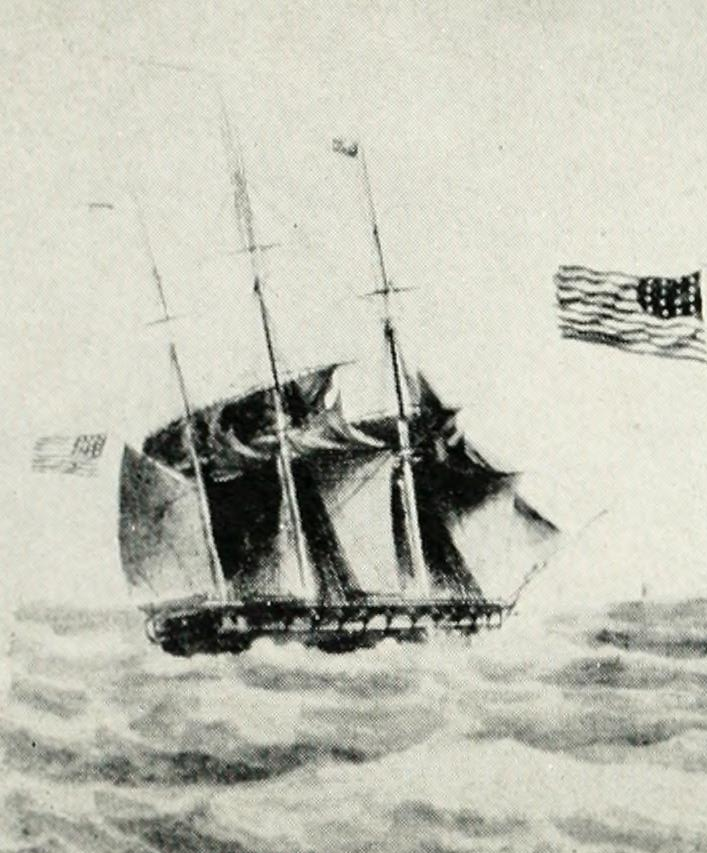
- USS Concord

History

United States
- Name: USS Concord
- Namesake: Town of Concord, Massachusetts
- Builder: Portsmouth Naval Shipyard
- Launched: 24 September 1828
- Commissioned: 7 May 1830
- Fate: Ran aground and abandoned, 2 November 1842

General characteristics
- Type: Sloop-of-war
- Tonnage: 700
- Length: 127 ft (39 m)
- Beam: 33 ft 9 in (10.29 m)
- Draft: 16 ft 6 in (5.03 m)
- Complement: 190
- Armament: 20 guns

USS Concord was a wooden-hulled, three-masted sloop-of-war of the United States Navy, launched on 24 September 1828 from the Portsmouth Naval Shipyard in Kittery, Maine. She was the first US Navy vessel to bear the name 'Concord' and was so named after the town of Concord for its role at the beginning of the American Revolution. The vessel had a tonnage of 700. The Concord had a complement of 190 officers and seamen with an armament of 20 guns and saw service protecting American merchant ships and other interests in several places around the world. The ship and her crew, who also functioned as Marines, fought in the Seminole Wars in Florida. Concord ran aground while on a patrolling mission along the African coast. Despite determined efforts from the crew, with three losing their lives in the process, the Concord was unable to be refloated. It was the first ship christened by a woman. Sloop-of-war Concord, launched in 1828, was "christened by a young lady of Portsmouth." This is the first known instance of a woman sponsoring a United States Navy vessel. Unfortunately, the contemporary account does not name this pioneer female sponsor (Ceremonial ship launching).

== Characteristics ==
As a sloop of war, Concord was a three-masted ship of 700 tons and was a smaller vessel compared to frigates and ships of the line, which generally measured 1500 and 2200 tons respectively. The sloop type provoked dissatisfaction, due to the navy board's insistence that they be made to carry 24 guns, despite their dimensions making them better suited to carrying 20 guns. They were criticized for being slow, due in part to their full after body and often being overloaded, a practice typical of vessels in a navy during peace time. Concord as designed was 127 feet long, but had a draft of 16 feet, resulting in an increase in displacement without an increase in length.

== History ==
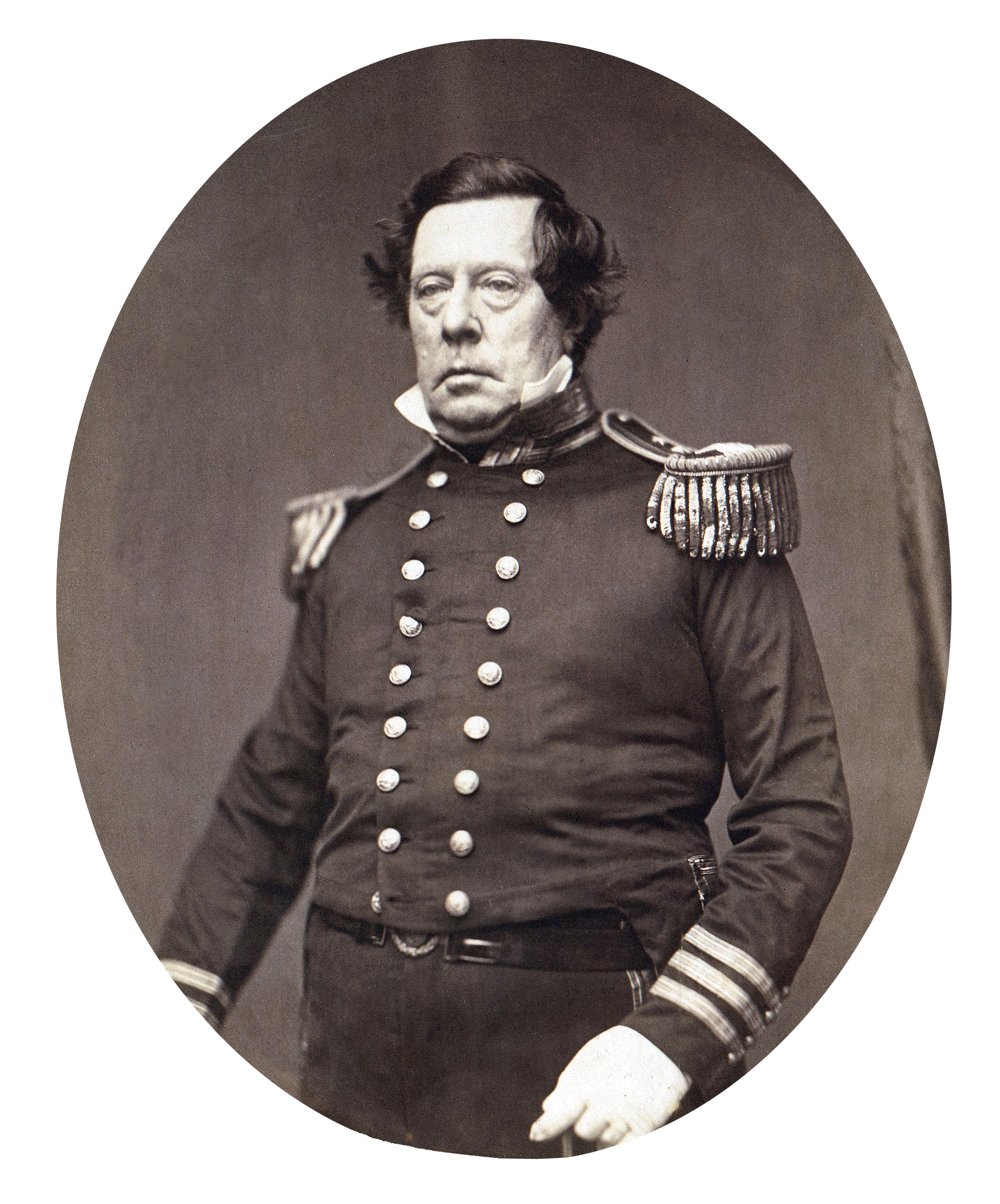
Matthew C. Perry, first commander of the USS Concord

The Concord was commissioned on 7 May 1830 with a crew of 190 men and placed under the command of Commodore Matthew C. Perry (Note: Matthew Perry was the younger brother of Oliver Hazard Perry) and saw service as part of the US squadron in the Mediterranean Sea from 22 April 1830 to 10 December 1832. Under Perry's command the Concord was used to transport the US envoy John Randolph of Roanoke, Virginia, to the Imperial Russian court at St. Petersburg in 1832. (Note: While in Russia Perry turned down an invitation from the Tsar to join the Imperial Russian Navy) The ship's naval surgeon was William Turk of Whitehall, New York, who kept a log book detailing names of officers, crew illness and the various treatments administered, weather conditions, and accounts of local events at various ports along their journey.

In 1835, the Concord was ordered to the western Florida coast at the beginning of the Second Seminole War to survey the rivers, inlets, and bars along that stretch of the Florida seaboard. Because of the extreme shortage of trained soldiers in the territory a Commodore Alexander J. Dallas agreed to provide crewmen from the Concord to assist in the fighting against the Seminole Indians.

In January 1837 some 50 Sailors from the Concord's crew under the command of Lieutenant Thomas J. Leib were sent north from Tampa to the newly completed Fort Foster at the Hillsborough River Bridge to relieve the troops of the garrison there so those Soldiers could search the surrounding swamps for the Seminoles who had been harassing the fort and other locations in the area. The Sailors along with the Artillerymen were successful in repelling hostile Seminoles when they attempted to burn the bridge. In February, from the cover of the forest treeline, the hostiles had been firing their muskets and rifles at the men in the fort for quite sometime. It came to a head when the Seminole became brave enough to make an attempt to set fire to the bridge. This attempt was met with canister shot from the cannons within the blockhouses and some highly aggressive musket fire from the Sailors of the Concord. It was soon after this attack, about 180 Marines arrived from Fort Brooke to relieve the Naval garrison.

The Sailors served there for three months with 20 Artillerymen before returning to the Concord where they set sail west to the Mexican coast to protect American shipping interests there. The Concord also saw service in the West Indies from 1836 to 1837 and again in 1838, and at the Brazil station in 1842 protecting American commerce in the South Atlantic, and finally in the waters between Madagascar and Mozambique in 1842, protecting a fleet of American whaling ships.

In late 1838 the Concord again returned to the waters off the western Florida coast to prevent agents working for the Spanish and British from smuggling gunpowder, shot and other supplies to the hostile Seminoles.

== Fate ==
On 2 November 1842, while under the command of Commander William Boerum, the Concord ran aground on a sandbar at the mouth of the Ligonha River in Mozambique. Three crew members died during unsuccessful attempts to re-float the ship. Among them was her captain, when they were swept away by strong currents while they were trying to make their way to shore crossing the sandbar. Boerum was replaced by Lieutenant J. M. Gardner, who decided that the situation was hopeless, and consequently the Concord was abandoned by the remainder of her crew. Gardner then chartered the Portuguese brig Unao to take the crew of the Concord to Rio de Janeiro. Among the officers who also served aboard the ship was Midshipman John Rodgers, son of the famous Commodore John Rodgers who served in the War of 1812.

== See also ==
- List of sloops of war of the United States Navy
- Bibliography of early American naval history

== Bibliography ==
- Paullin, Charles Oscar (1910). Commodore John Rodgers, captain, commodore, and senior officer of the American navy, 1773-1838; a biography. Cleveland, Ohio: The Arthur H. Clark Company. p. 434.
- Canney, Donald L. (2001). Sailing warships of the US Navy. Chatham Publishing / Naval Institute Press. p. 224. ISBN 1-55750-990-5.
- Chapelle, Howard I. (1949) [1935]. The History of the American Sailing Navy: the Ships and their Development. New York: W.W. Norton & Company. p. 558. ISBN 1-56852-222-3. Archived from the original on 23 January 2005.
- "Concord I (sloop-of-war)". Dictionary of American Naval Fighting Ships. Department of the Navy– Naval Historical Center.
- Reilly, John C. (5 January 2021). "Christening, Launching, and Commissioning of U.S. Navy Ships". history.navy.mil.
