= George Dallas =

George Dallas may refer to:

- George M. Dallas (1792–1864), U.S. Senator from Pennsylvania and 11th Vice President of the United States
- George M. Dallas (judge) (1839–1917), American lawyer and judge of the U.S. Court of Appeals for the Third Circuit
- Sir George Dallas, 1st Baronet (1758–1833), British Member of Parliament for Newport 1800–1802
- George Dallas (Labour politician) (1878–1961), British Member of Parliament for Wellingborough 1929–1931
- George Dallas (cricketer) (1827–1888), British army officer and cricketer

== See also ==
- George Dallas Sherman, musician
- Dallas (surname)
