= Thomas J. Leib =

American naval officer (1806–1851)

Thomas Jefferson Leib
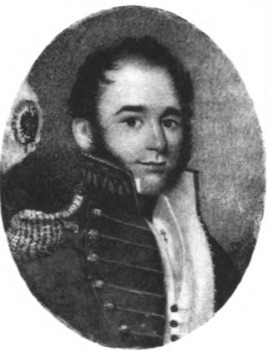
- Born: 1806; Philadelphia, Pennsylvania
- Died: July 14, 1851 (aged 44–45); Philadelphia, Pennsylvania
- Burial place: Laurel Hill Cemetery, Philadelphia
- Spouse: Caroline Matilda Harrison
- Military career
- Allegiance: United States
- Service years: 1811–1851
- Rank: Commander
- Commands: Schooner Motto; Fort Foster
- Conflicts: Second Seminole War

Thomas Jefferson Leib (1806 – July 14, 1851) was an American naval officer of the early 19th-century sailing ship era, active in Florida's Second Seminole War as well as anti-piracy and smuggling suppression patrols throughout the Gulf of Mexico, Caribbean Sea, and West Indies.

== Early life ==
Thomas Jefferson Leib was born in Philadelphia, Pennsylvania, in 1806. His parents were John Lewis Leib (1775–1838) and Margaret Leib (Vioner) (1778–1836).

== Career ==
Leib was commissioned a midshipman in September 1811. Between 1818 and 1820, he served aboard the 74-gun ship-of-the-line USS Franklin. During this time, Franklin cruised the Mediterranean, serving as the flagship of Commodore Charles Stewart. This was followed in 1821 by service in the 14-gun barque USS Spark performing anti-piracy patrols in the West Indies. He returned home to Philadelphia in 1822 before serving on the frigate USS Congress, commanded by Capt. James Biddle, in 1823–1824 as it operated as part of the West Indian Squadron against pirates and illicit slavers. He continued serving in the West Indies on the 36-gun frigate USS Constellation when it was added to the West Indian squadron in 1825. In 1827, he was on the 12-gun schooner USS Shark engaged in anti-piracy patrol and slave trade suppression. During an extended leave of absence between 1828 and 1832, he was promoted to lieutenant. He returned to sea-going duty in 1833 aboard the newly commissioned 10-gun schooner USS Boxer, commanded by Lt. B. Page, as it cruised off the coast of Brazil and in the West Indies. After a two-year leave of absence, in 1836, Leib reported for duty on board the USS Concord operating off the coast of west Florida, commanded by Capt. Mervine P. Mix.

== Second Seminole War ==
Late in 1835, the US government determined to remove the Seminole Indian tribe of south-central Florida to designated lands west of the Mississippi. After negotiations between the government and Indian leaders broke down, the Seminoles began raiding white settlements and military detachments. The conflict, known as the Second Seminole War, lasted between 1835 and 1842. This conflict was one of the few Indian wars in which the US Navy played a substantial role. The US Army requested that the Navy establish a blockade around Florida. It was long known that the Seminoles maintained trade relations with the Spanish in Cuba, and authorities suspected that arms and provisions were being smuggled in from British Bahamas.

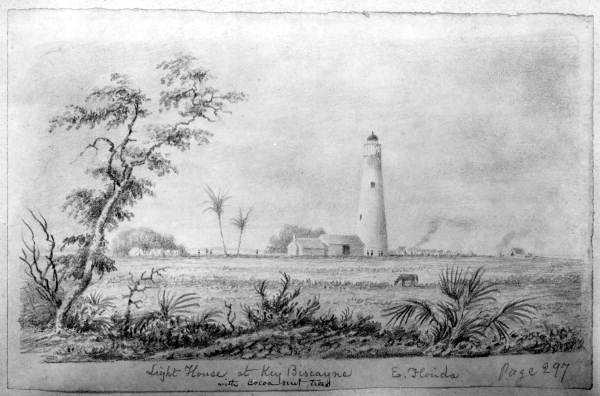
Cape Florida Light, 1830

In early June 1836, USS Concord was at Tampa Bay. Leib was directed to take the Army contract schooner Motto, along with a detachment of 20 sailors and Marines, and investigate a reported cache of Seminole gunpowder stored on Indian Key in the northern Florida Keys. He did not find much gunpowder at Indian Key; however, while in the vicinity, he learned of a shipwreck around New River, Florida, with a reported cargo of lead. Leib took the Motto north and was in the vicinity of the shipwreck during the third week of July. He dived on the wreck; no lead was found. On July 23, after hearing a large explosion to the north, Leib sailed the Motto to investigate. Early morning the next day, upon arriving in the vicinity of Cape Florida Light, at the south end of Key Biscayne, he observed the lighthouse and several settlement buildings had been attacked and burned. Leib led a rescue party ashore and discovered both the lighthouse keeper and assistant had sought refuge at the top of the lighthouse. Both were severely injured and trapped up in the lighthouse tower. Unfortunately, the assistant succumbed to his multiple wounds. The wounded lighthouse keeper could not descend from the building; the fire destroyed the stairs. The sailors ran a line up to the tower and jury-rigged a harness so that two crew members could ascend and bring the lighthouse keeper down. After getting the wounded man onboard Motto, Leib transported him to Key West. Leib departed Key West and rejoined USS Concord, which had relocated to Pensacola.

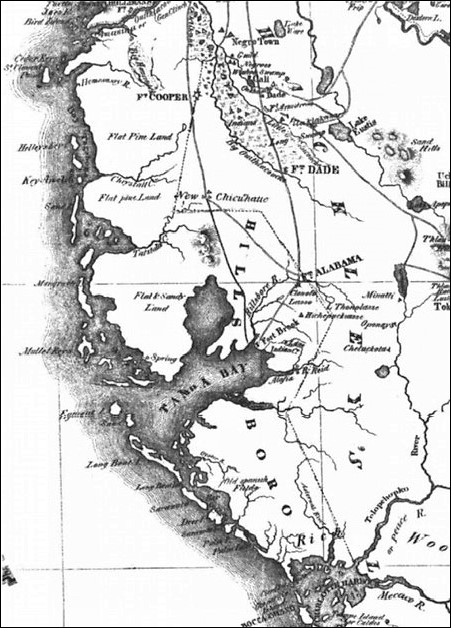
Area of Second Seminole War showing location of Fort Alabama, later renamed Fort Foster

In the fall of 1836, the Army decided to re-occupy the previously abandoned Fort Alabama site. The newly built fortification, consisting of a stockade, storehouse, and magazine, was named Fort Forster in honor of Lieutenant Colonel William Foster, the officer leading the detachment that constructed the works. Located approximately 30 miles northeast of Tampa Bay, the area was adjacent to a bridge across the Hillsborough River.

In December 1836, Commodore Alexander J. Dallas, commander of the Navy's West Indian Squadron, conferred in Tampa Bay with Commanding General Thomas Sidney Jessup. The Commodore offered sailors and marines to man several static forts to free army and militia troops to pursue a mobile campaign against the Seminoles.

Aboard USS Concord, located in Tampa Bay, Captain Mix selected Lt. Leib to lead a detachment of two midshipmen and fifty sailors to proceed to Fort Foster. In early January 1837, Leib marched north and garrisoned Fort Foster. Over the next few weeks, Seminole bands attacked the fort and twice tried to burn the bridge. The garrison, under Leib's command, successfully resisted these attacks. Gradually the troops in the field began to withdraw from the swamps and brush and returned to the forts. In March, US Army troops replaced Leib and his sailors.

Upon detaching USS Concord, Leib went on an extended leave of absence. He did not return to active sea duty. He was promoted to commander on March 30, 1844.

== Personal life ==
In June 1828, Leib married Caroline Matilda Harrison (1803–1893) at Priestly Lodge in Philadelphia. Caroline Harrison was the niece of former US Senator for Pennsylvania and Philadelphia postmaster Michael Leib (1760-1822). They had five children: John Lewis (b. 1829), Lydia Virginia (b. 1830), Mary Jacoba (b. 1834), Harrison (b. 1839).

Leib died July 14, 1851, aged 45 years. He is buried in Laurel Hill Cemetery, Philadelphia.
