= Fort Foster (Florida) =

Defensive fort in Florida, US

Fort Foster Historic Site
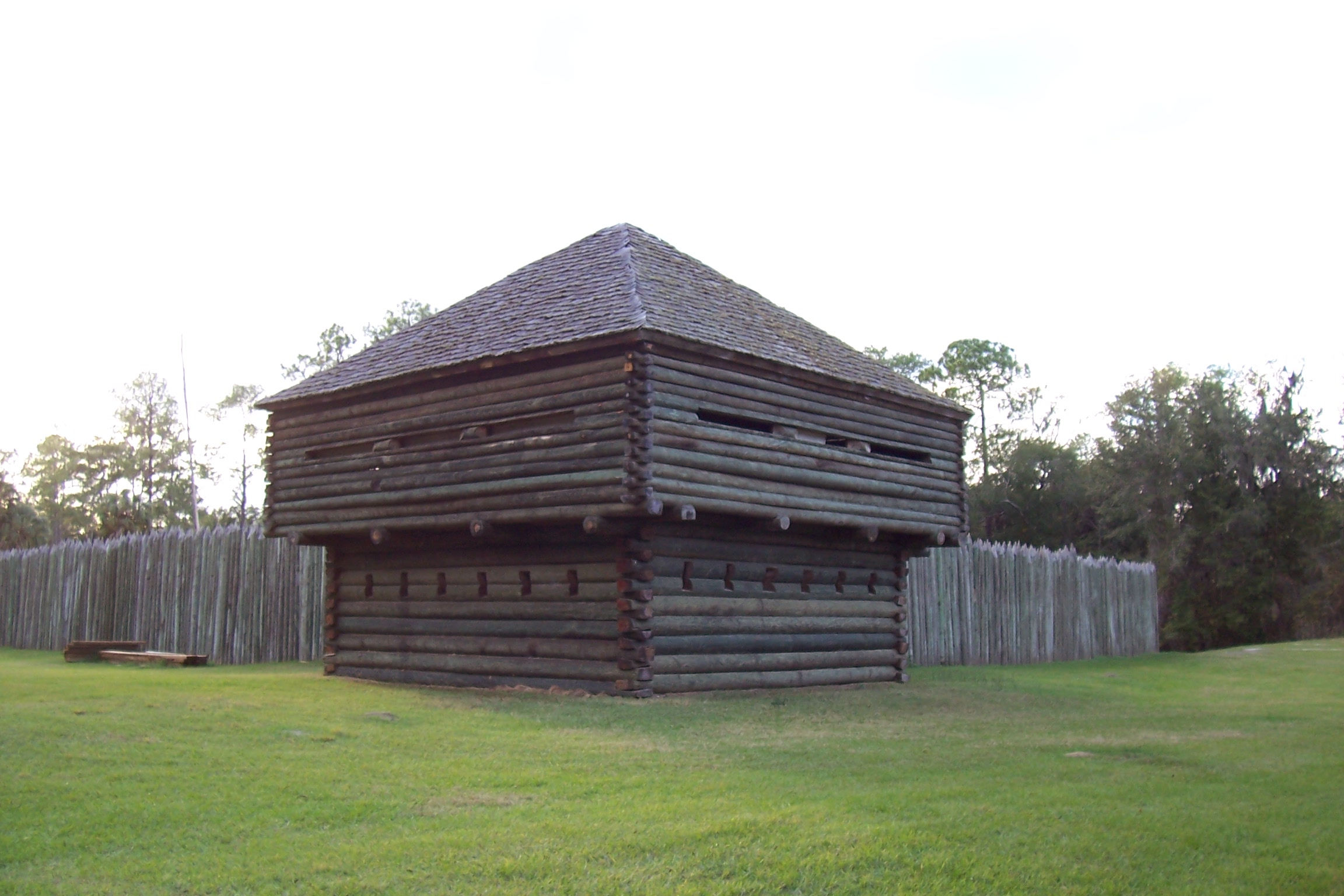
- A view from outside the fort

- Location within Florida
- Interactive map of Fort Foster Historic Site
- Location: Hillsborough County, Florida, USA
- Nearest city: Zephyrhills, Florida
- Coordinates: 28°8′57″N 82°13′11″W
- Established: June 13, 1972
- Governing body: Florida Department of Environmental Protection
- Fort Foster
- U.S. National Register of Historic Places
- Location within Florida Location within the United States
- Nearest city: Zephyrhills, Florida
- Area: 30 acres (12.1 ha)
- Architect: Foster, Lt. Col. William, S.
- NRHP reference No.: 72000324
- Added to NRHP: June 13, 1972

Fort Foster (now known as Fort Foster Historic Site) is a Second Seminole War era fort in central Florida, located 9 miles (14 km) south of current-day Zephyrhills in Pasco County.

Fort Foster was originally built in December 1836 under the direction of Lieutenant Colonel William S. Foster on the site of Fort Alabama. On December 1, 1836, Foster arrived at the site with 430 men to rebuild the fort and bridge that had been destroyed months earlier. By December 19, he had erected two blockhouses, a large storehouse and a fort. Then on December 22, Foster departed with 180 men, and 25 wagons with provisions and forage to resupply Fort Armstrong. The remainder of his men were tasked with completing the bridge and powder magazine.

On January 1, 1837, Foster boasted in a letter to General R. Jones that, "the works at 'Fort Foster' on the Hillsborough River. That Fort & Bridge form one of the best and strongest field fortifications ever erected against Indians."

Fort Foster was a strategic fortification built for the protection of the bridge and with more importance on the supplies within. Fortified supply depots were continuously placed deeper into Seminole territory to allow the soldiers to operate in the field while they captured the hostile Seminoles.

The armament and supplies at Fort Foster consisted as follows: A six-pounder gun and a twelve pounder howitzer with at least 100 rounds of ammunition for each. Forty thousand rounds of rifle powder and bullets. Fifty thousand ball and buckshot cartridges. Fifty thousand rations of subsistence and ten thousand bushels of corn. Tools of every description as well as iron, steel, nails, cordage, and other materials required for service in the field.

In January 1837, the Army soldiers were relieved to search out hostiles and build other forts. Fort Foster continued to be garrisoned as a supply post by Navy Lieutenant Thomas J. Leib, two midshipmen and about 50 sailors from USS Concord. The 3rd and 4th Artillery Regiments provided Leib with 20 artillerymen to man the six-pound iron gun and twelve-pound howitzer to assist defending the fortification and bridge.

The site was significant for several skirmishes in February 1837 during the Second Seminole War, when the sailors from USS Concord and the artillerymen resisted hostile Seminole attacks and their attempts to burn the bridge. In March 1837, the sailors were relieved by members of the 1st and 2nd Artillery Regiments and 25 members of the Creek Indian Volunteers. During the summer, the fort was abandoned due to reductions in hostilities and an increase of disease among its forces, aka, the sickly season.

Fort Foster was reactivated in the fall of 1837 to the summer 1838 to act as a supply post. Then it remained abandoned until 1841–1842, and again in 1849 when it only opened for short periods to meet the needs of the military when Seminole activity threatened.

The fort site was added to the US National Register of Historic Places on June 13, 1972. The fort was reconstructed on the site by the state and opened to the public in February 1980. It is owned and operated by the Florida State Park system as Fort Foster State Historic Site, a part of Hillsborough River State Park.

== Gallery ==
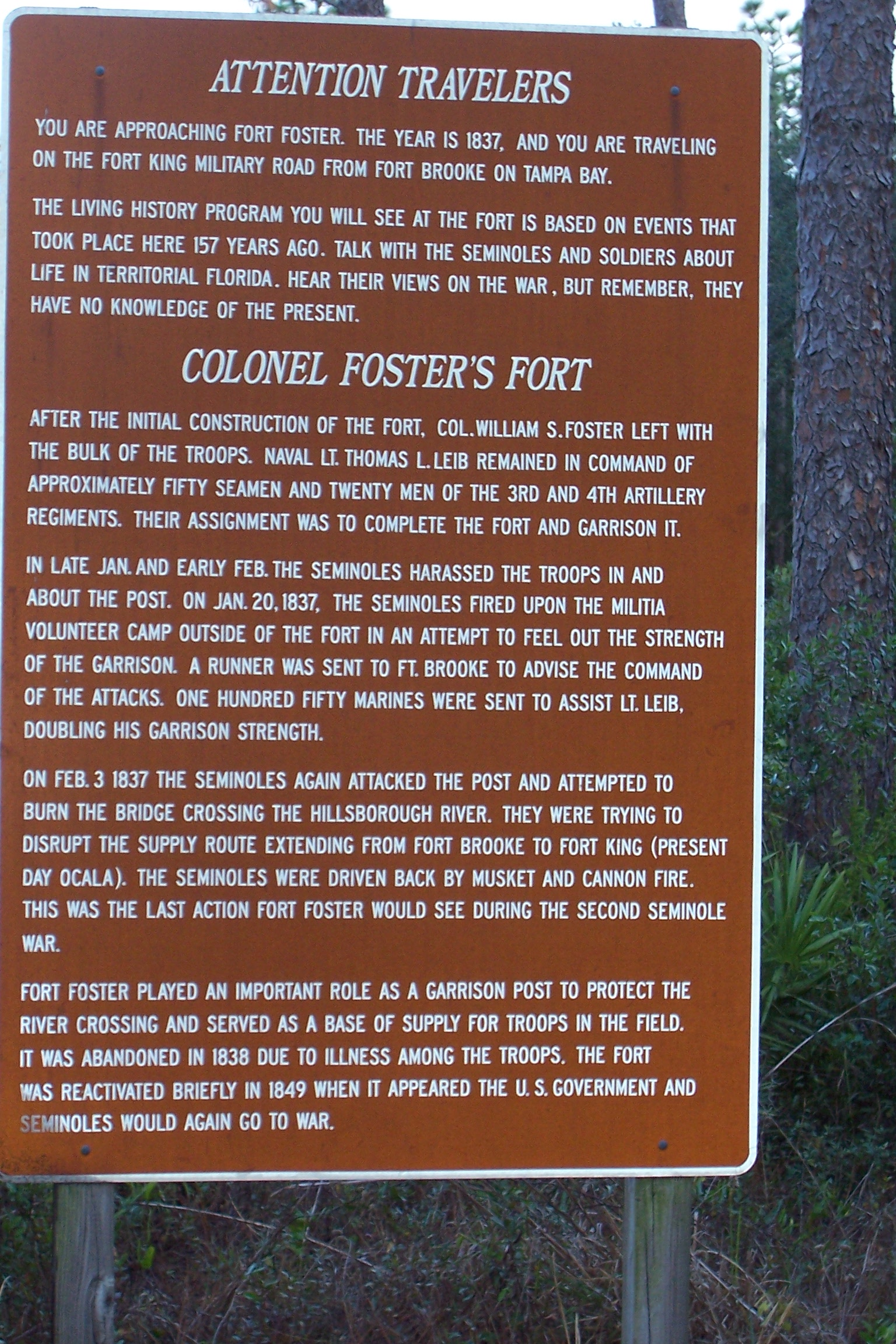
Sign explaining background

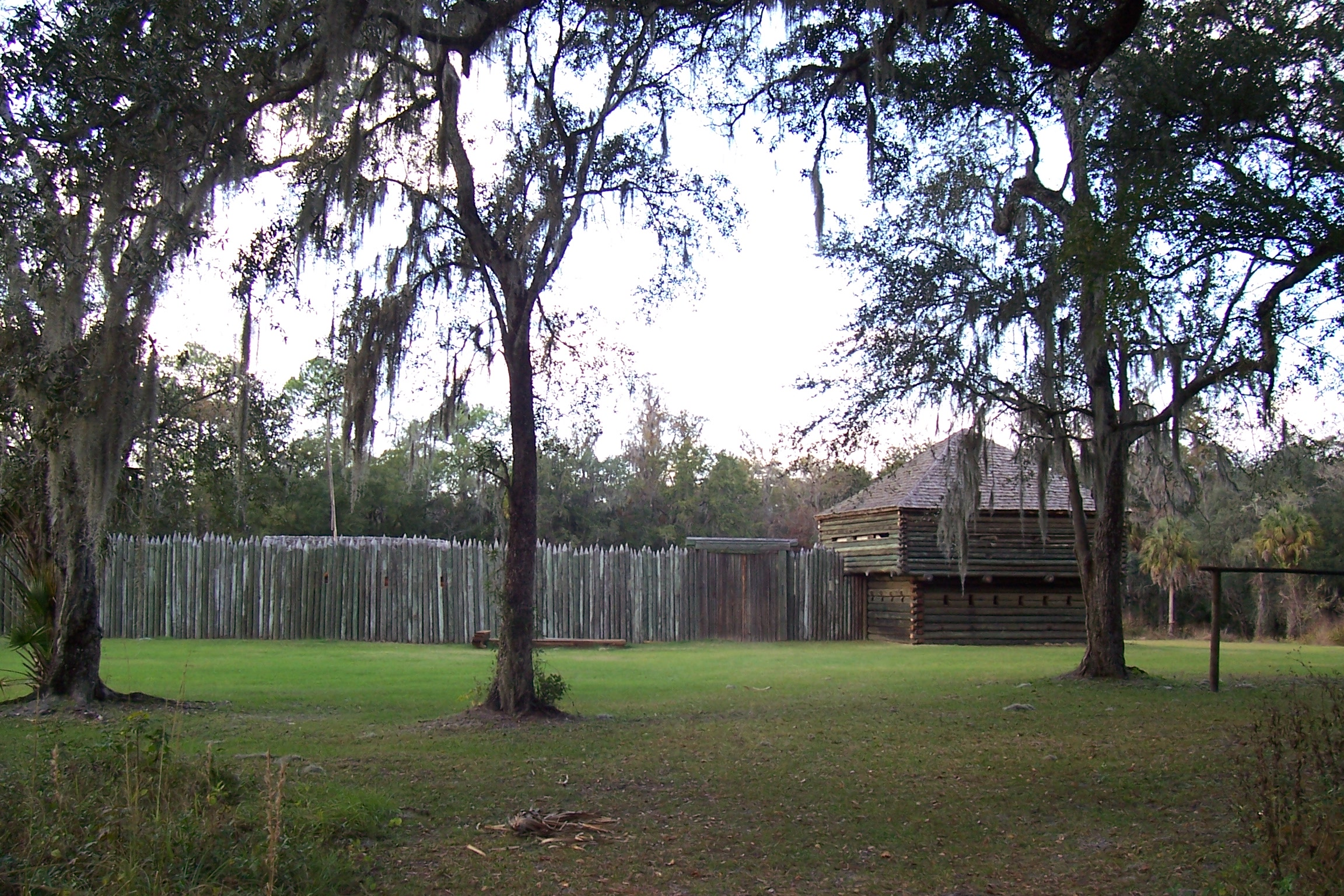
View of stockade

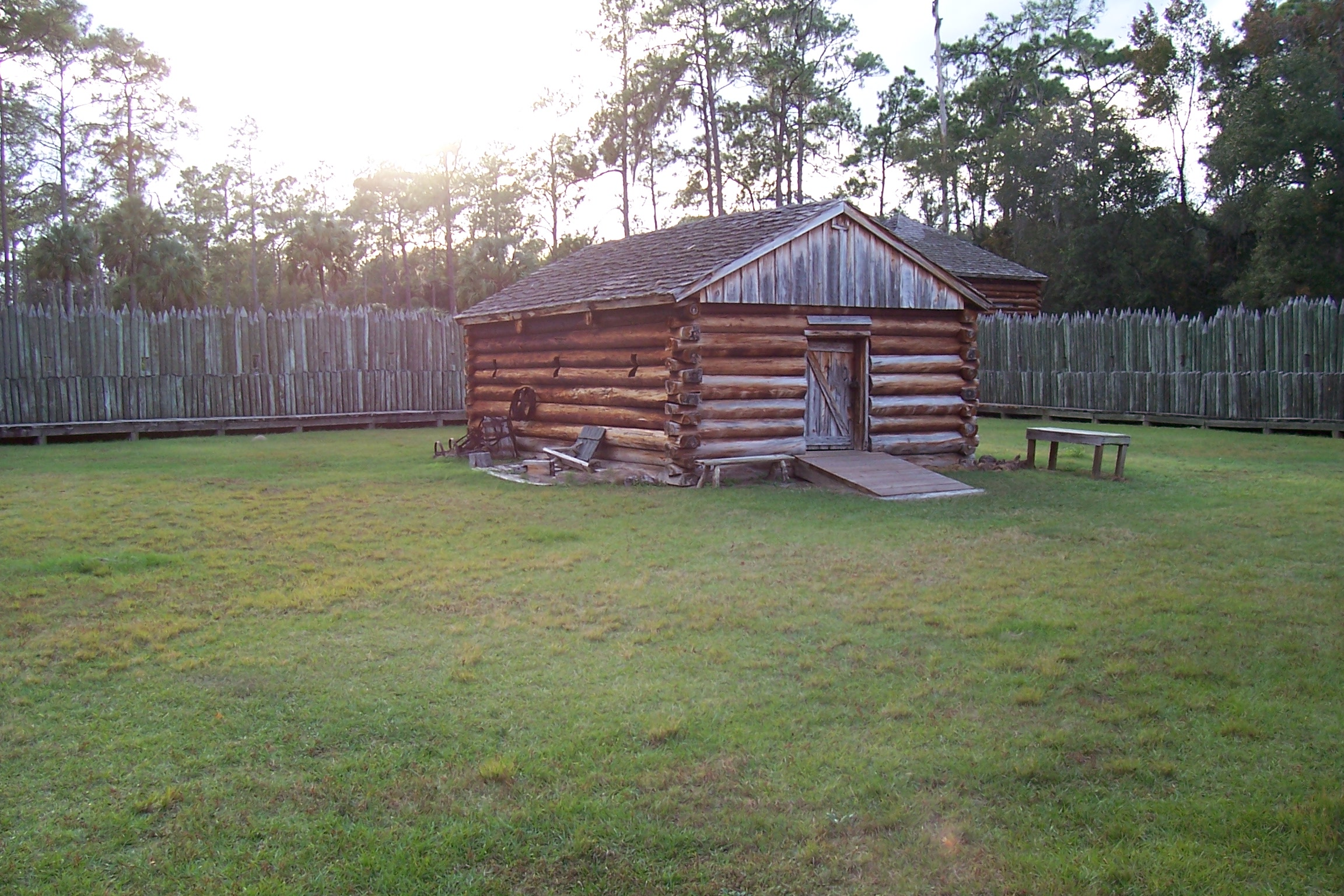
Interior of the fort

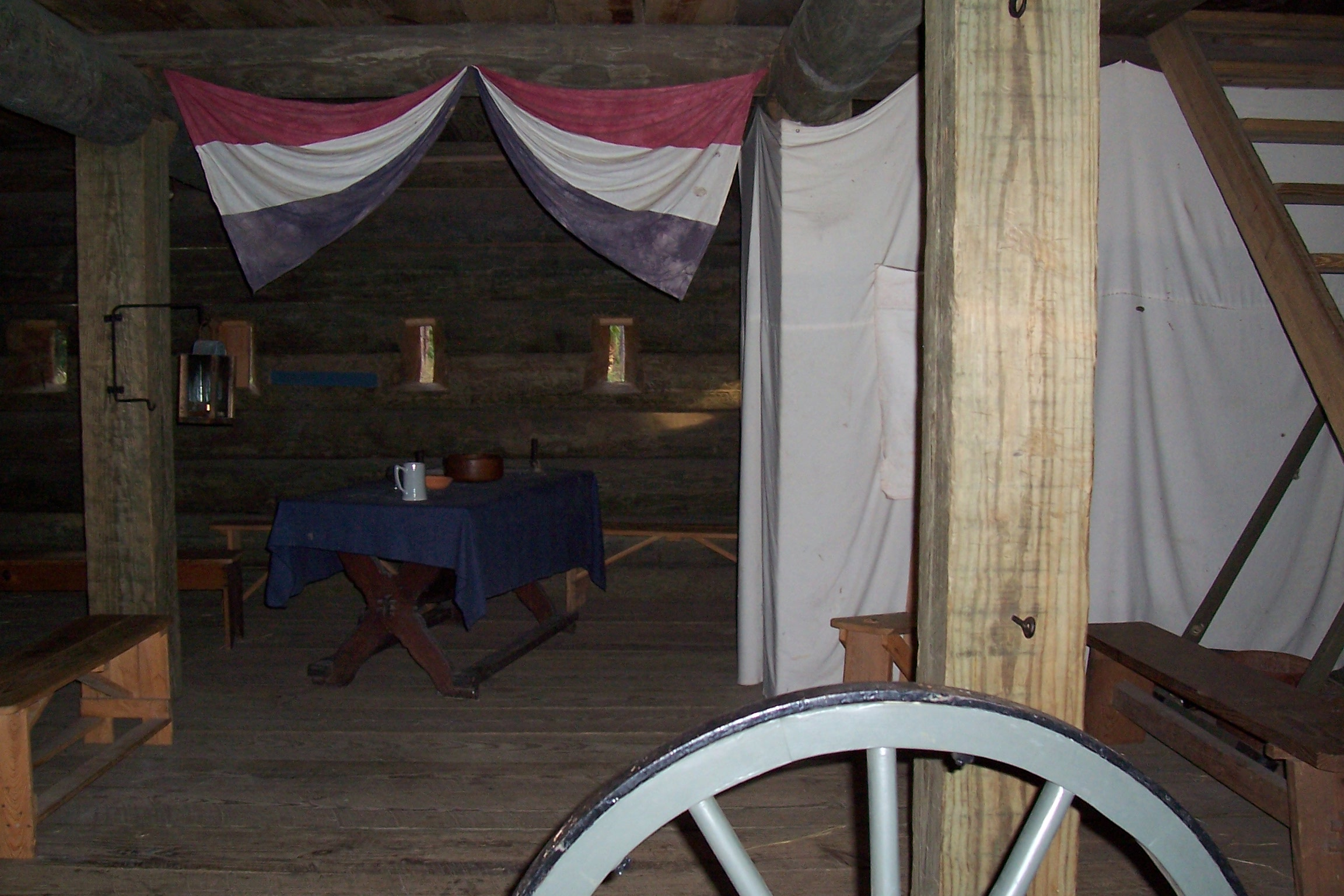
Another view inside
