= Dulles =

Dulles may refer to:

- John Foster Dulles (1888–1959), United States Secretary of State from 1953 to 1959
  - Dulles International Airport, major airport in Northern Virginia in the Washington, D.C. area, named after John Foster Dulles
    - Dulles International Airport station, a Washington Metro Station
    - Dulles, Virginia, community named after the airport
  - Dulles High School (Sugar Land, Texas), public high school named after John Foster Dulles
- Allen Dulles (1893–1969), former head of the Central Intelligence Agency, brother of John Foster Dulles
- Avery Dulles (1918–2008), cardinal of the Roman Catholic Church, son of John Foster Dulles
- Eleanor Lansing Dulles (1895–1996), economist and diplomat, sister of Allen and John Foster Dulles
- Foster Rhea Dulles (1900–1970), American journalist and historian, cousin of John Foster Dulles
- John Welsh Dulles (1823–1887), Presbyterian minister and author, grandfather of John Foster Dulles
- John W. F. Dulles (1913–2008), scholar of Brazilian history, son of John Foster Dulles

== See also ==
- Dalles (disambiguation)
