= Dalas (disambiguation) =

Dalas is a village in Mahshahr County, Khuzestan Province, Iran.

Dalas may also refer to:

- Dalas Santavy (born 1972), Canadian weightlifter
- Data Loading and Analysis System, an electronic database

== See also ==
- Dala (disambiguation)
- Dallas (disambiguation)
