= Dalles =

Dalles may refer to:

- The Dalles, Oregon, a city in the U.S.
  - The Dalles Dam
  - Fort Dalles
  - The Dalles High School
  - The Dalles Municipal Airport, or Columbia Gorge Regional Airport
  - Dalles Formation, a geologic formation
- Dalles of the St. Croix River, in Minnesota and Wisconsin, U.S.
- Niisaachewan Anishinaabe Nation, also known as the Dalles First Nation, an Ojibway First Nation in Canada
  - The Dalles 38C, an Ojibway First Nation reserve in Kenora District, Ontario, Canada
- John A. Dalles, American clergyman and hymnwriter

== See also ==
- Dallas (disambiguation)
- Dulles (disambiguation)
- Dalle, a surname
- Dalles des Morts ('Death Rapids'), a former stretch of the Columbia River in Canada
