= Dalle =

Dalle is a surname. Notable people with the surname include:

- Béatrice Dalle (born 1964), French actress
- Brody Dalle (born 1979), Australian singer-songwriter and musician
- François Dalle (died 2005), French businessman
- Peter Dalle (born 1956), Swedish actor, comedian, writer and film director

== See also ==
- Dalles (disambiguation)
- Dalle de verre, a glass art technique
