= Frank Alamo =

French singer (1941–2012)

- Born: Jean-François Grandin; 12 October 1941; Paris, France
- Died: 11 October 2012 (aged 70); Paris, France
- Occupation: Singer

Frank Alamo (born Jean-François Grandin; 12 October 1941 – 11 October 2012) was a French singer. He achieved his greatest success in the 1960s.

== Biography ==
He was born in Paris. He sang in a leading French children's choir, "Les Petits Chanteurs à la croix de bois", and studied music in London between 1957 and 1960. While skiing at Val-d'Isère in 1962, he met pop music promoter and record company executive Eddie Barclay, who heard him singing popular English and American songs in French. Barclay signed him to his label, and persuaded him to take the stage name Frank Alamo, the surname being in tribute to John Wayne's film The Alamo.

Alamo helped popularise the yé-yé style of music in France. His hit records included "Biche ô ma Biche" ("Sweets for My Sweet"), "Je veux prendre ta main" ("I Want to Hold Your Hand"), and "Je me bats pour gagner" ("A Hard Day's Night"). In all, he released 30 singles over a five-year period in the early and mid-1960s, including some original songs.

He retired from the music business when he married in 1969, becoming a photographer and later a manager in the automobile industry. In 1983, he was chasing a beautiful blonde girl who was driving a funny car, she brought him to a factory and there Frank Alamo bought not a single car but the whole plant: the Dallas jeep company. He sold it in 1996 in order to give further singing performances. However he never recovered success.

== Death ==
He was married twice. He died in Paris in 2012, on the eve of his 71st birthday, after having been diagnosed with amyotrophic lateral sclerosis (ALS).
