= Darcy Dallas =

Canadian ice hockey player

- Born: October 2, 1972 (age 53) Olds, Alberta, Canada
- Height: 5 ft 11 in (180 cm)
- Weight: 205 lb (93 kg; 14 st 9 lb)
- Position: Defence
- Shot: Right
- Played for: Orlando Solar Bears (IHL); Pee Dee Pride (ECHL); San Antonio Iguanas (CHL)
- NHL draft: Undrafted
- Playing career: 1997–2001

Darcy Dallas (born October 2, 1972) is a Canadian former professional ice hockey defenceman.

Dallas attended Northern Michigan University to play four seasons (1993 – 1997) with the Northern Michigan Wildcats where he captained the NCAA college hockey team, scoring 13 goals and 38 assists for 51 points, while earning 236 penalty minutes, in 106 games played.

Dallas went on to play four years of professional hockey, including 197 regular season and 26 playoff games played with the Pee Dee Pride of the ECHL.

== Career statistics ==
			Regular season					Playoffs
Season	Team	League	GP	G	A	Pts	PIM	GP	G	A	Pts	PIM
1990–91	Olds Grizzlys	AJHL	52	14	14	28	200	—	—	—	—	—
1992–93	Olds Grizzlys	AJHL	55	21	57	78	260	—	—	—	—	—
1993–94	Northern Michigan University	NCAA	31	2	11	13	68	—	—	—	—	—
1994–95	Northern Michigan University	NCAA	2	1	0	1	0	—	—	—	—	—
1995–96	Northern Michigan University	NCAA	39	5	15	20	96	—	—	—	—	—
1996–97	Northern Michigan University	NCAA	34	5	12	17	72	—	—	—	—	—
1997–98	Orlando Solar Bears	IHL	2	0	0	0	65,535	—	—	—	—	—
1997–98	Pee Dee Pride	ECHL	69	7	8	15	126	8	0	1	1	24
1998–99	Pee Dee Pride	ECHL	70	15	24	39	123	13	0	3	3	42
1999–00	Pee Dee Pride	ECHL	58	4	9	13	82	5	2	1	3	8
2000–01	San Antonio Iguanas	CHL	62	7	23	30	130	9	0	1	1	34
2001–02	Edson Ice	NCHL-AB	3	1	1	2	12	—	—	—	—	—
ECHL totals			197	26	41	67	331	26	2	5	7	74
