= Dallas (jeep) =

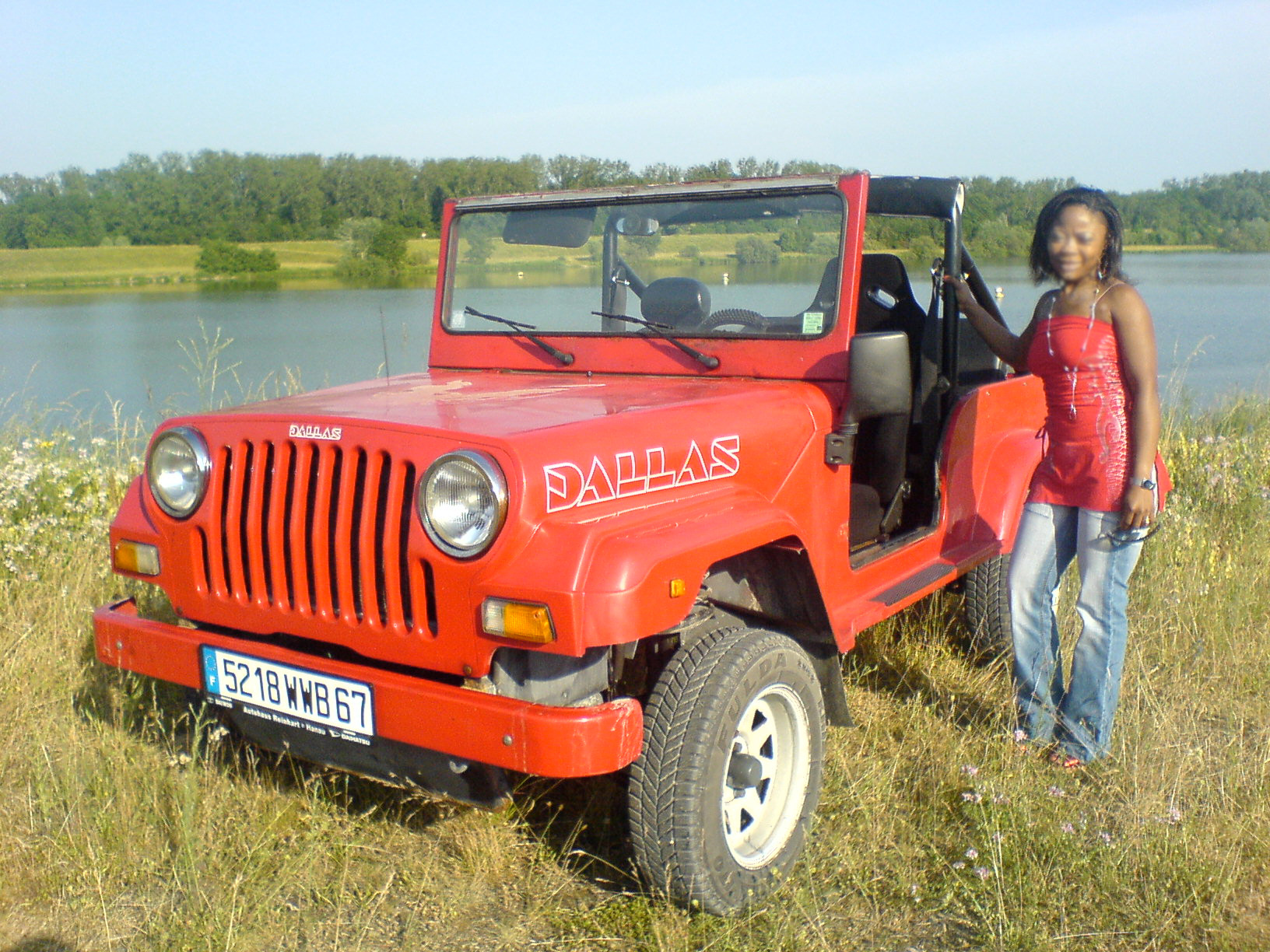

Overview
- Manufacturer: Automobiles Grandin
- Production: 1981–1998
- Designer: Jean-Claude Hrubon

Body and chassis
- Class: Off-road compact SUV
- Body style: 2-door utility roadster
- Layout: Front engine, front-wheel drive / four-wheel drive
- Platform: Renault 4, Peugeot 205

Powertrain
- Engine: gasoline; diesel

The Dallas Jeep was a Dallas car model designed by Jean-Claude Hrubon.

The Jeep Dallas was built on a Renault 4 chassis, shortened by 47 cm and equipped with the engine of the Renault 4 GTL, a 1106 cc 34ch. Its body was designed in the spirit of the Willys MB U.S. military, called "Jeep", with proportions that were his own. The Dallas was named in December 1981 and was presented at the Salon de l'Automobile Porte de Versailles in October 1982. It is marketed mainly in two-wheel drive (front); a 4x4 model (with Sinpar transmission) is also in the catalog.

In 1983, Jean-François Grandin, alias Frank Alamo, purchased the factory, and after 2 years, "Grandin Automobiles" became the third French manufacturer.

From 1981 to 1984, Dallas had a steel body, and from 1984 the hull was made of polyester with less army-like style.

In 1987, the Dallas jeep changed: it adopted a new galvanized chassis and a fiberglass body, and was equipped with a PSA engine, making it a vehicle without any problems of corrosion and reliability.

It is equipped with an XY8 engine with an all-aluminum block of 1360 cc. This engine with a Weber 35IBSH dual carburetor body is as simple as that fitted to the original Peugeot 104 ZS and the first Peugeot 205 XS, XT and GT. The peculiarity of this engine is that the gearbox is integrated into the engine block: the lubrication is common to both and when the engine is drained the gearbox is drained at the same time. This engine has a chain drive.

In 1988 the Dallas series adopted the TU engines and a more modern design from the Citroën AX: the TU3S with Solex 32-34Z body double carburetor for the 205 XS, developing 85 horsepower. Distribution was now by toothed belt. The cylinder is exactly the same, consumption falls slightly. The TU3S motor is a sports motor by design.

In 1993, the Dallas was re-styled and re-adopted the gasoline engine TU3M/Z and the XUD7 Diesel always came from the organ bank of PSA. Its chassis changed from 3 meters to 3.10 meters, and its body became rounded.

The TU3M/Z of the same size as its predecessor, 1360 cc, lost 10HP and went to 75 horsepower by adopting injection.

The XUD7, with a displacement of 1700 cc and developing 59 ch, is a small 60 horsepower engine that was only enough for the city.

In 1996, Frank Alamo sold his company and left the business.

In 1998, production of the Dallas stopped. When the factory closed down, the last batch was sold by Dallas Auction.

A little fewer than 5000 copies of this car were built from 1981 to 1998.

== Information ==
- Made by Automobiles Grandin
- Total made: 5,000
- Motor: gasoline or diesel
- Empty weight: 650 to 815 kilograms
- 2 doors, 2 or 4 seats
- Length 2.970 to 3.500 meters
- Width 1.360 to 1.630 meters
