= Rosalind Dallas =

British graphic designer (1949–2015)

Rosalind Dallas (2 March 1949 - 14 March 2015) was a British graphic designer

The grand daughter of the artist Warwick William Lendon (1883–1971), Dallas and her sister Jennie lived with him after her parents separated. She was educated at the Camden School for Girls and trained at Brighton School of Art. In her graduation show her promise was noted by the Head of Graphics at the BBC, John Aston, and she joined the Corporation.

Dallas worked for the BBC throughout her career, initially working on graphics for the early Open University broadcasts, and subsequently on programmes including Elizabeth R (1971), Testament of Youth (1979) and Hot Shoe Shuffle, and the 1998 redesign of the title sequence for Question Time. Her memorial notice from BAFTA noted her work on the 1997-1999 sitcom Citizen Smith, Mike Newell's 1991 film Enchanted April and Adrian Shergold's 1995 Devil's Advocate.

Ian Beck, in his obituary of Dallas, wrote that by the 1970s graphic designers working in television were responsible for much more than title cards and caption rolls. they worked "closely with writers and directors they devised, designed and directed lengthy title sequences, directing actors, briefing illustrators and lettering artists, commissioning props and supervising elaborate animations". He described her as having an excellent knowledge of period graphics, as needed by a graphic designer, and noted her "quicksilver wit and a wide range of knowledge worn lightly".

In her retirement she took up rowing on the River Thames and was involved in the campaign against the Thames Tideway Scheme (the "super-sewer"), asserting that work on it over a period of seven years would cause huge disruption including danger to local rowers.

Her mother and her sister Jennie survived her.
