= USS Dallas (DD-199) =

Clemson-class destroyer

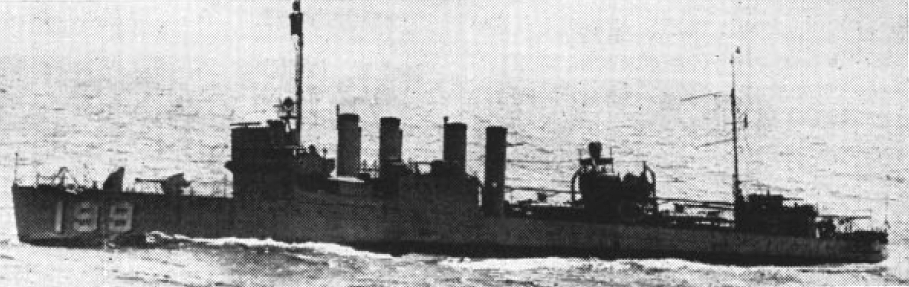
- USS Dallas underway sometime before World War II.

History

United States
- Namesake: Alexander J. Dallas
- Builder: Newport News Shipbuilding & Dry Dock Company
- Laid down: 25 November 1918
- Launched: 31 May 1919
- Commissioned: 29 October 1920
- Decommissioned: 26 June 1922
- Recommissioned: 14 April 1925
- Decommissioned: 23 March 1939
- Recommissioned: 25 September 1939
- Renamed: Alexander Dallas, 31 March 1945
- Decommissioned: 28 July 1945
- Stricken: 13 August 1945
- Nickname(s): Dull Ass
- Fate: Sold 30 November 1945

General characteristics
- Class & type: Clemson-class destroyer
- Displacement: 1,215 tons
- Length: 314 feet 4 inches (95.81 m)
- Beam: 31 feet 8 inches (9.65 m)
- Draft: 9 feet 10 inches (3.00 m)
- Propulsion: 26,500 shp (20 MW); geared turbines, 2 screws
- Speed: 33.3 kn (38.3 mph; 61.7 km/h)
- Complement: 130 officers and enlisted
- Armament: 4 x 4 in (100 mm) guns, 1 x 3 in (76 mm) gun, 12 x 21 inch (533 mm) TT.

USS Dallas (DD-199) was a Clemson-class destroyer in the United States Navy during World War II. She was the second ship named for Captain Alexander J. Dallas, and was later renamed Alexander Dallas.

== Construction and commissioning ==
Dallas was launched on 31 May 1919 by Newport News Shipbuilding & Dry Dock Company; sponsored by Miss W. D. Strong, great-granddaughter of Captain Dallas; and commissioned on 29 October 1920.

== Service history ==
=== Pre-World War II ===
Dallas operated on the United States East Coast, participating in exercises and maneuvers from her base at Charleston, South Carolina. She arrived at Philadelphia on 12 April 1922 and was decommissioned there on 26 June.

Recommissioned on 14 April 1925, Dallas served with various destroyer squadrons, acting as flagship for Squadrons 9, 7, and 1. Until 1931, she cruised along the U.S. East Coast and in the Caribbean, engaging in gunnery exercises, battle torpedo practice, fleet maneuvers, and fleet problems; participating in joint United States Army-U.S. Navy exercises; training members of the United States Naval Reserve; and serving as experimental ship at the Naval Torpedo Station, Newport, Rhode Island.

On 9 January 1932, Dallas departed Charleston, South Carolina, bound for the United States West Coast, arriving at San Diego, California, on 21 March 1932. She operated along the U.S. West Coast and in the Hawaiian Islands, conducting force practice and tactical exercises and participating in combined fleet exercises.

Dallas departed San Diego on 9 April 1934 for the Presidential Review of the Fleet in June 1934 at New York City and tactical exercises on the U.S. East Coast and in the Caribbean. Returning to San Diego on 9 November 1934, Dallas continued to operate in the Pacific Ocean until 1938, cruising to Hawaii and Alaska.

Dallas operated in the Panama Canal Zone area between May and November 1938, visiting ports of the Republic of Panama; rendering service to Submarine Squadron 3; and making a good-will call at Buenaventura, Colombia. On 17 November 1938 she weighed anchor for the U.S. East Coast, arriving at Philadelphia on 23 November 1938. She again was placed out of commission on 23 March 1939.

=== World War II ===
With the outbreak of World War II in Europe on 1 September 1939, Dallas was recommissioned on 25 September 1939 and assigned to the United States Atlantic Fleet, serving as flagship for Destroyer Squadrons 41 and 30. She patrolled along the U.S. East Coast and conducted training exercises until 7 July 1941, when she got underway for Naval Station Argentia in the Dominion of Newfoundland, where she arrived on 11 July 1941. Between 11 July 1941 and 10 March 1942 she patrolled between Argentia and Halifax, Nova Scotia, and escorted convoys to Reykjavík, Iceland, and Derry, Northern Ireland.

From 1 April 1942 to 3 October, Dallas escorted coastal shipping from New York and Norfolk, Virginia to Florida, Texas, Cuba, Bermuda, and ports in the Caribbean. On 25 October she cleared Norfolk to rendezvous with Task Force 34 bound for the Operation Torch amphibious landings in North Africa. Dallas was to carry a U.S. Army Raider battalion, and land them up the narrow, shallow, obstructed Sebou River to take a strategic airfield near Port Lyautey, French Morocco. On 10 November 1942 she began her run up the river under the guidance of Rene Malevergne, a civilian pilot who would later become the first foreign civilian to receive the Navy Cross. Under cannon and small arms fire throughout her voyage up the river, she plowed her way through mud and shallow water, narrowly missing many sunken ships and other obstructions, and sliced through a cable crossing the river to land her troops safely just off the airfield. Her outstanding success in completing this mission with its many unexpected complications won her the Presidential Unit Citation. On 15 November 1942, she departed the African coast for Boston, Massachusetts, arriving there 26 November 1942.

Dallas had convoy duty between Norfolk, New York, and New London, Connecticut — also making one voyage to Gibraltar from 3 March to 14 April 1943 — until 9 May 1943, when she departed Norfolk for Oran, Algeria, arriving there on 23 May 1943. She patrolled off the North African coast, then on 9 July 1943 joined Task Force 81 for screening duty during the Battle of Gela from 10 to 12 July during Operation Husky, the Allied invasion of Sicily. She returned to convoy and patrol duties until 7 September 1943, when she joined the escort for a convoy bound for the amphibious landings on the mainland of Italyin Operation Avalanche. Dallas screened the transport group during the landings at Salerno on 9 September 1943, and joined a southbound convoy on 11 September 1943, rescuing two downed British airmen on her way to Oran. She escorted reinforcements to Salerno, then served on escort and patrol in the Mediterranean until 11 December 1943, when she got underway for the U.S. East Coast, arriving at Philadelphia on 24 December 1943.

Following a thorough overhaul at Charleston, South Carolina, Dallas escorted two convoys to North Africa between 23 February and 9 June 1944. On the second voyage, the escorts came under attack by enemy torpedo planes on 11 May 1944, but successfully defended the convoy; Dallas shot down at least one plane, and damaged others. She served on the U.S. East Coast on various training and convoy assignments. On 31 March 1945, her name was changed to Alexander Dallas to avoid confusion with the planned heavy cruiser USS Dallas (CA-150), named after Dallas, Texas, rather than Alexander J. Dallas.

== Fate ==
Arriving at the Philadelphia Navy Yard on 7 June 1945, Alexander Dallas was decommissioned there on 28 July 1945. Stricken from the Navy Register on 13 August 1945, she was sold on 30 November 1945 to the Boston Metals Company of Baltimore, Maryland, for scrapping for US$8,700.00.

== Convoys escorted ==
Convoy	Escort Group	Dates	Notes
HX 150		17–25 Sep 1941	from Newfoundland to Iceland prior to US declaration of war
ON 22		7–15 Oct 1941	from Iceland to Newfoundland prior to US declaration of war
HX 157		30 Oct-8 Nov 1941	from Newfoundland to Iceland prior to US declaration of war
ON 35		15–27 Nov 1941	from Iceland to Newfoundland prior to US declaration of war
HX 164		10–19 Dec 1941	from Newfoundland to Iceland
ON 49		27 Dec 1941-5 Jan 1942	from Iceland to Newfoundland
HX 171		22–30 Jan 1942	from Newfoundland to Iceland
ON 63		7–13 Feb 1942	from Iceland to Newfoundland

== Awards ==
In addition to her Presidential Unit Citation, Dallas received four battle stars for World War II service.

== Commemoration ==
Dallas′s ship's bell is displayed at Navy Reserve Center Fort Worth at Naval Air Station Joint Reserve Base Fort Worth in Fort Worth, Texas.
