= USCGC Dallas =

Dallas has been the name of more than one ship of the United States Revenue Cutter Service and United States Coast Guard, and may refer to:

- USRC Dallas (1816), a cutter in commission in the Revenue Cutter Service from 1816 to 1821
- USRC Vigilant (1824), a cutter in commission in the Revenue Cutter Service from 1824 to 1836 that was renamed Dallas by 1830
- USRC Dallas (1846), a cutter in commission in the Revenue Cutter Service from 1846 to 1848
- USRC Dallas (1874), a cutter in commission in the Revenue Cutter Service from 1874 to 1907
- USCGC Dallas (1925), a patrol boat in commission in the Coast Guard from 1925 to 1936
- USCGC Dallas (WHEC-716), a high endurance cutter commissioned in 1967 and decommissioned in 2012. The vessel was then transferred to the Philippine Navy and renamed BRP Ramon Alcaraz (FF-16).
