= Alexander J. Dallas (United States Navy officer) =

United States Navy officer

Alexander James Dallas
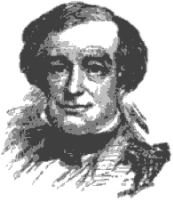
- Born: May 15, 1791; Philadelphia, Pennsylvania, U.S.
- Died: June 3, 1844 (aged 53); Callao, Peru
- Relatives: Alexander James Dallas (father); Arabella Smith (mother); Vice President George M. Dallas (brother); Henrietta Constantia Meade (wife)
- Military career
- Allegiance: United States
- Branch: United States Navy
- Service years: 1805–1844
- Rank: Captain
- Commands: West Indies Squadron; Pensacola Navy Yard (1832–1843)
- Conflicts: War of 1812; Second Barbary War; Second Seminole War

Alexander James Dallas (May 15, 1791 – June 3, 1844) was an officer in the United States Navy.

== Early life ==
Dallas was born on May 15, 1791, in Philadelphia, Pennsylvania. His father, also named Alexander James Dallas, was the U.S. Secretary of the Treasury under James Madison. His brother, George M. Dallas was Vice President of the U.S. under James K. Polk.

== Career ==
Dallas entered the Navy as a Midshipman in November 1805. He served in the War of 1812, the Second Barbary War, and in the suppression of piracy with the West Indies Squadron. Dallas also established and commanded the Pensacola Navy Yard from 1832 to 1843, and served in the Second Seminole War.

== Personal life, death and legacy ==
In 1821, Dallas married Henrietta Constantia Meade, daughter of merchant Richard W. Meade and the sister of American Civil War general George Meade; she died in Pensacola, Florida, in 1831.

Dallas died on June 3, 1844, in Callao, Peru, and was buried at Cementerio Británico (Antiguo), in Bellavista, Callao, Peru. Fort Dallas in Florida and the U.S. Naval destroyer USS Dallas are named after him.
