= Leroy Township, Benton County, Iowa =

Township in Iowa, US

Leroy Township
- Township
- Location in Benton County
- Coordinates: 41°54′39″N 92°07′52″W
- Country: United States
- State: Iowa
- County: Benton

Area
  - Total: 35.78 sq mi (92.67 km^{2})
  - Land: 35.70 sq mi (92.47 km^{2})
  - Water: 0.077 sq mi (0.2 km^{2}) 0.22%
- Elevation: 850 ft (260 m)

Population (2020)
  - Total: 1,172
  - Density: 33/sq mi (12.7/km^{2})
- Time zone: UTC-6 (CST)
  - Summer (DST): UTC-5 (CDT)
- ZIP codes: 52209, 52257
- GNIS feature ID: 0468206

Leroy Township is one of twenty townships in Benton County, Iowa, United States. At the 2020 census, its population was 1,172.

== Geography ==
According to the United States Census Bureau, Leroy Township covers an area of 35.78 square miles (92.67 square kilometers); of this, 35.7 square miles (92.47 square kilometers, 99.78 percent) is land and 0.08 square miles (0.2 square kilometers, 0.22 percent) is water.

=== Cities, towns, villages ===
- Blairstown
- Luzerne (east half)

=== Adjacent townships ===
- Union Township (north)
- Eldorado Township (northeast)
- St. Clair Township (east)
- Washington Township, Iowa County (southeast)
- Marengo Township, Iowa County (south)
- Honey Creek Township, Iowa County (southwest)
- Iowa Township (west)
- Kane Township (northwest)

=== Cemeteries ===
The township contains these four cemeteries: International, Old International, Pleasant Hill and Stringtown (historical).

=== Lakes ===
- Hannen Lake

=== Landmarks ===
- Hannen Park

== School districts ==
- Belle Plaine Community School District
- Benton Community School District

== Political districts ==
- Iowa's 3rd congressional district
- State House District 39
- State Senate District 20
