= Iowa Township, Benton County, Iowa =

Township in Iowa, US

Iowa Township
- Township
- Location in Benton County
- Coordinates: 41°54′36″N 92°13′49″W
- Country: United States
- State: Iowa
- County: Benton

Area
  - Total: 32.81 sq mi (84.98 km^{2})
  - Land: 32.7 sq mi (84.8 km^{2})
  - Water: 0.069 sq mi (0.18 km^{2}) 0.21%
- Elevation: 922 ft (281 m)

Population (2000)
  - Total: 423
  - Density: 13/sq mi (5/km^{2})
- Time zone: UTC-6 (CST)
  - Summer (DST): UTC-5 (CDT)
- ZIP codes: 52208, 52249, 52257
- GNIS feature ID: 0468077

Iowa Township is one of twenty townships in Benton County, Iowa, United States. As of the 2000 census, its population is 423.

== Geography ==
According to the United States Census Bureau, Iowa Township covers an area of 32.81 square miles (84.98 square kilometers); of this, 32.74 square miles (84.8 square kilometers, 99.79 percent) is land and 0.07 square miles (0.18 square kilometers, 0.21 percent) is water.

=== Cities, towns, villages ===
- Luzerne (west half)

The city of Belle Plaine is entirely within this township geographically but is a separate entity.

=== Unincorporated towns ===
- Irving at 41.948329°N 92.295186°W

(This list is based on USGS data and may include former settlements.)

=== Adjacent townships ===
- Kane Township (north)
- Union Township (northeast)
- Leroy Township (east)
- Marengo Township, Iowa County (southeast)
- Honey Creek Township, Iowa County (south)
- Jefferson Township, Poweshiek County (southwest)
- Belle Plaine Township (west)
- Salt Creek Township, Tama County (west)
- York Township, Tama County (northwest)

=== Cemeteries ===
The township contains these three cemeteries: Beal, Lutheran and Wright.

=== Major highways ===
- Iowa Highway 21

=== Airports and landing strips ===
- Belle Plaine Municipal Airport

== School districts ==
- Belle Plaine Community School District
- Benton Community School District

== Political districts ==
- Iowa's 3rd congressional district
- State House District 39
- State Senate District 20
