= Fremont Township, Benton County, Iowa =

Township in Iowa, US

Fremont Township
- Township
- Location in Benton County
- Coordinates: 41°59′33″N 91°53′36″W
- Country: United States
- State: Iowa
- County: Benton

Area
  - Total: 36.24 sq mi (93.85 km^{2})
  - Land: 36.24 sq mi (93.85 km^{2})
  - Water: 0 sq mi (0 km^{2}) 0%
- Elevation: 817 ft (249 m)

Population (2000)
  - Total: 1,736
  - Density: 48/sq mi (18.5/km^{2})
- Time zone: UTC-6 (CST)
  - Summer (DST): UTC-5 (CDT)
- ZIP codes: 52206, 52228, 52315, 52324, 52332
- GNIS feature ID: 0467872

Fremont Township is one of twenty townships in Benton County, Iowa, United States. At the 2000 census, its population was 1,736.

== Geography ==
According to the United States Census Bureau, Fremont Township covers an area of 36.23 square miles (93.85 square kilometers).

=== Cities, towns, villages ===
- Atkins

=== Adjacent townships ===
- Canton Township (north)
- Fayette Township, Linn County (northeast)
- Clinton Township, Linn County (east)
- Fairfax Township, Linn County (southeast)
- Florence Township (south)
- St. Clair Township (southwest)
- Eldorado Township (west)
- Eden Township (northwest)

=== Cemeteries ===
The township contains these three cemeteries: Fix, Raetz and Saint Stephens.

=== Major highways ===
- U.S. Route 30

== School districts ==
- Benton Community School District
- Vinton-Shellsburg Community School District

== Political districts ==
- Iowa's 3rd congressional district
- State House District 39
- State Senate District 20
