= Florence Township, Benton County, Iowa =

Township in Iowa, US

Florence Township
- Township
- Location in Benton County
- Coordinates: 41°54′04″N 91°53′10″W
- Country: United States
- State: Iowa
- County: Benton

Area
  - Total: 36.33 sq mi (94.09 km^{2})
  - Land: 36.33 sq mi (94.09 km^{2})
  - Water: 0 sq mi (0 km^{2}) 0%
- Elevation: 778 ft (237 m)

Population (2000)
  - Total: 2,258
  - Density: 62/sq mi (24/km^{2})
- Time zone: UTC-6 (CST)
  - Summer (DST): UTC-5 (CDT)
- ZIP codes: 52206, 52228, 52318, 52351, 52354
- GNIS feature ID: 0467836

Florence Township is one of twenty townships in Benton County, Iowa, United States. As of the 2000 census, its population was 2,258.

== Geography ==
According to the United States Census Bureau, Florence Township covers an area of 36.33 square miles (94.09 square kilometers).

=== Cities, towns, villages ===
- Norway
- Walford (west half)

=== Adjacent townships ===
- Fremont Township (north)
- Clinton Township, Linn County (northeast)
- Fairfax Township, Linn County (east)
- Monroe Township, Johnson County (southeast)
- Lenox Township, Iowa County (south)
- Washington Township, Iowa County (southwest)
- St. Clair Township (west)
- Eldorado Township (northwest)

=== Cemeteries ===
The township contains these two cemeteries: Norway and Saint Michaels.

=== Major highways ===
- U.S. Route 151

== School districts ==
- Benton Community School District
- College Community School District

== Political districts ==
- Iowa's 3rd congressional district
- State House District 39
- State Senate District 20
