= Monroe Township, Benton County, Iowa =

Township in Iowa, US

Monroe Township
- Township
- Location in Benton County
- Coordinates: 42°10′27″N 92°14′35″W
- Country: United States
- State: Iowa
- County: Benton

Area
  - Total: 36.31 sq mi (94.04 km^{2})
  - Land: 36.30 sq mi (94.01 km^{2})
  - Water: 0.012 sq mi (0.03 km^{2}) 0.03%
- Elevation: 932 ft (284 m)

Population (2000)
  - Total: 259
  - Density: 7.3/sq mi (2.8/km^{2})
- Time zone: UTC-6 (CST)
  - Summer (DST): UTC-5 (CDT)
- ZIP codes: 52224, 52229
- GNIS feature ID: 0468391

Monroe Township is one of twenty townships in Benton County, Iowa, United States. As of the 2000 census, its population was 259.

== History ==
Monroe Township was founded in 1851.

== Geography ==
According to the United States Census Bureau, Monroe Township covers an area of 36.31 square miles (94.04 square kilometers); of this, 36.3 square miles (94.01 square kilometers, 99.97 percent) is land and 0.01 square miles (0.03 square kilometers, 0.03 percent) is water.

=== Adjacent townships ===
- Bruce Township (north)
- Cedar Township (northeast)
- Jackson Township (east)
- Big Grove Township (southeast)
- Homer Township (south)
- Oneida Township, Tama County (southwest)
- Clark Township, Tama County (west)
- Geneseo Township, Tama County (northwest)

=== Cemeteries ===
The township contains these four cemeteries: Gnagy, Ramthun, Saint Joseph and Urmy.

=== Major highways ===
- U.S. Route 218
- Iowa Highway 8

== School districts ==
- Union Community School District
- Vinton-Shellsburg Community School District

== Political districts ==
- Iowa's 3rd congressional district
- State House District 39
- State Senate District 20
