= Canton Township, Benton County, Iowa =

Township in Iowa, US

Canton Township
- Township
- Location in Benton County
- Coordinates: 42°04′56″N 91°53′37″W
- Country: United States
- State: Iowa
- County: Benton

Area
  - Total: 35.40 sq mi (91.68 km^{2})
  - Land: 35.29 sq mi (91.41 km^{2})
  - Water: 0.10 sq mi (0.27 km^{2}) 0.29%
- Elevation: 820 ft (250 m)

Population (2020)
  - Total: 843
  - Density: 24/sq mi (9.3/km^{2})
- Time zone: UTC-6 (CST)
  - Summer (DST): UTC-5 (CDT)
- ZIP codes: 52324, 52332, 52349
- GNIS feature ID: 0467528

Canton Township is one of twenty townships in Benton County, Iowa, United States. As of the 2020 census, its population was 843.

== History ==
Canton Township was founded in 1846.

== Geography ==
According to the United States Census Bureau, Canton Township covers an area of 35.4 square miles (91.68 square kilometers); of this, 35.29 square miles (91.41 square kilometers, 99.71 percent) is land and 0.11 square miles (0.27 square kilometers, 0.29 percent) is water.

The city of Shellsburg is entirely within this township geographically but is a separate entity.

=== Adjacent townships ===
- Benton Township (north)
- Shellsburg Township (northeast)
- Fayette Township, Linn County (east)
- Clinton Township, Linn County (southeast)
- Fremont Township (south)
- Eldorado Township (southwest)
- Eden Township (west)
- Taylor Township (northwest)

=== Cemeteries ===
The township contains these three cemeteries: Oakwood, Parkers Grove and Shellsburg.

=== Landmarks ===
- Pleasant Creek State Park (vast majority)

== School districts ==
- Benton Community School District
- Vinton-Shellsburg Community School District

== Political districts ==
- Iowa's 3rd congressional district
- State House District 39
- State Senate District 20
