= Cedar Township, Benton County, Iowa =

Township in Iowa, US

Cedar Township
- Township
- Location in Benton County
- Coordinates: 42°15′35″N 92°06′49″W
- Country: United States
- State: Iowa
- County: Benton

Area
  - Total: 43.20 sq mi (111.89 km^{2})
  - Land: 42.78 sq mi (110.79 km^{2})
  - Water: 0.42 sq mi (1.1 km^{2}) 0.98%
- Elevation: 837 ft (255 m)

Population (2000)
  - Total: 533
  - Density: 12/sq mi (4.8/km^{2})
- Time zone: UTC-6 (CST)
  - Summer (DST): UTC-5 (CDT)
- ZIP codes: 50651, 52313, 52349
- GNIS feature ID: 0467548

Cedar Township is one of twenty townships in Benton County, Iowa, USA. As of the 2000 census, its population was 533.

== History ==
Cedar Township was founded in 1851.

== Geography ==
According to the United States Census Bureau, Cedar Township covers an area of 43.2 square miles (111.89 square kilometers); of this, 42.78 square miles (110.79 square kilometers, 99.02 percent) is land and 0.43 square miles (1.1 square kilometers, 0.98 percent) is water.

=== Cities, towns, villages ===
- Mount Auburn

=== Adjacent townships ===
- Jefferson Township, Buchanan County (northeast)
- Harrison Township (east)
- Taylor Township (southeast)
- Jackson Township (south)
- Monroe Township (southwest)
- Bruce Township (west)
- Big Creek Township, Black Hawk County (northwest)

=== Cemeteries ===
The township contains these three cemeteries: Engledow, Greenwall and Mount Auburn.

== School districts ==
- Union Community School District
- Vinton-Shellsburg Community School District

== Political districts ==
- Iowa's 3rd congressional district
- State House District 39
- State Senate District 20
