= Bruce Township, Benton County, Iowa =

Township in Iowa, US

Bruce Township
- Township
- Location in Benton County
- Coordinates: 42°14′54″N 92°13′50″W
- Country: United States
- State: Iowa
- County: Benton

Area
  - Total: 36.07 sq mi (93.42 km^{2})
  - Land: 36.07 sq mi (93.42 km^{2})
  - Water: 0 sq mi (0 km^{2}) 0%
- Elevation: 912 ft (278 m)

Population (2000)
  - Total: 319
  - Density: 8.8/sq mi (3.4/km^{2})
- Time zone: UTC-6 (CST)
  - Summer (DST): UTC-5 (CDT)
- ZIP codes: 50651, 52224, 52229
- GNIS feature ID: 0467494

Bruce Township is one of twenty townships in Benton County, Iowa, United States. As of the 2000 census, its population was 319. As of 2018, the population is 298.

== History ==
Bruce Township was founded in 1853.

== Geography ==
According to the United States Census Bureau, Bruce Township covers an area of 36.07 square miles (93.42 square kilometers).

=== Adjacent townships ===
- Big Creek Township, Black Hawk County (northeast)
- Cedar Township (east)
- Jackson Township (southeast)
- Monroe Township (south)
- Clark Township, Tama County (southwest)
- Geneseo Township, Tama County (west)
- Eagle Township, Black Hawk County (northwest)

=== Cemeteries ===
The township contains Fairview Cemetery.

=== Major highways ===
- U.S. Route 218

== School districts ==
- Union Community School District

== Political districts ==
- Iowa's 3rd congressional district
- State House District 39
- State Senate District 20
