= Iowa Highway 8 =

State highway in Iowa, United States

Iowa Highway 8
- Iowa 8 highlighted in red

Route information
- Maintained by Iowa DOT
- Length: 13.961 mi (22.468 km)

Major junctions
- West end: US 63 in Traer
- Iowa 21 at Dysart
- East end: US 218 near Garrison

Location
- Country: United States
- State: Iowa
- Counties: Tama; Benton

Highway system
- Iowa Primary Highway System; Interstate; US; State; Secondary; Scenic
← Iowa 7	→ Iowa 9

Iowa Highway 8 is a state highway that runs from east to west in east central Iowa. Highway 8 is a short state highway in Iowa, at only 14 miles (23 km) long. Iowa 8 begins at an intersection with U.S. Highway 63 in Traer and ends at an intersection with U.S. Highway 218 northwest of Garrison. The route has largely remained the same since its designation.

== Route description ==
Iowa 8 begins in downtown Traer at an intersection with US 63. As it exits the small community, it turns to the southeast and then again to the east, forming a long S curve. Through Tama County, the highway travels over a plain with farmland on either side of the road. Two miles (3.2 km) west of Dysart, the road is intersected by Iowa 21, which joins Iowa 8 from the north. For the next 2.5 miles (4.0 km), the two highways run together until they reach the eastern limits of Dysart, which is also the Tama–Benton county line. Now in Benton County, the Iowa 8 continues due east. The final three miles (4.8 km) of the route are much hillier than the preceding ten miles (16 km). The highway ends at the midpoint of a 90-degree turn along US 218 northwest of Garrison.

== History ==
Prior to becoming a primary highway, Iowa 8's route was a part of the Diagonal Trail, which connected Sioux Falls, South Dakota, and Danville, Illinois. Through Iowa, it passed through Davenport, Cedar Rapids, Iowa Falls, Spencer, and Spirit Lake. The Diagonal Trail was registered with the Iowa State Highway Commission on December 4, 1918. When the primary highway system was created, a portion of the Diagonal Trail was assigned Primary Road No. 58. This portion of Primary Road No. 58 (which was truncated) was renumbered Iowa 8 in the 1926 Iowa highway renumbering. Since its designation, the route mostly has remained unchanged. Two sharp curves east of Traer were eliminated for a straighter route with one more-gradual curve.

== Major intersections ==
County	Location	mi	km	Destinations	Notes
Tama	Traer	0.000	0.000	US 63 (Main Street) – Waterloo, Toledo	
Tama	Clark Township	6.301	10.140	Iowa 21 north – Waterloo	Western end of Iowa 21 overlap
Tama–Benton county line	Dysart	8.790	14.146	Iowa 21 south (Holsted Street) / CR V37 north – Dysart	Eastern end of Iowa 21 overlap
Benton	Monroe Township	13.961	22.468	US 218 – La Porte City, Vinton	
1.000 mi = 1.609 km; 1.000 km = 0.621 mi: Concurrency terminus
