= Eldorado Township, Benton County, Iowa =

Township in Iowa, US

Eldorado Township
- Township
- Location in Benton County
- Coordinates: 41°59′36″N 92°00′35″W
- Country: United States
- State: Iowa
- County: Benton

Area
  - Total: 35.60 sq mi (92.21 km^{2})
  - Land: 35.60 sq mi (92.21 km^{2})
  - Water: 0 sq mi (0 km^{2}) 0%
- Elevation: 942 ft (287 m)

Population (2000)
  - Total: 1,240
  - Density: 35/sq mi (13.4/km^{2})
- Time zone: UTC-6 (CST)
  - Summer (DST): UTC-5 (CDT)
- ZIP codes: 52209, 52315, 52346, 52354
- GNIS feature ID: 0467771

Eldorado Township is one of twenty townships in Benton County, Iowa, United States. As of the 2000 census, its population was 1,240.

== Geography ==
According to the United States Census Bureau, Eldorado Township covers an area of 35.6 square miles (92.21 square kilometers).

=== Cities, towns, villages ===
- Newhall

=== Adjacent townships ===
- Eden Township (north)
- Canton Township (northeast)
- Fremont Township (east)
- Florence Township (southeast)
- St. Clair Township (south)
- Leroy Township (southwest)
- Union Township (west)
- Big Grove Township (northwest)

=== Cemeteries ===
The township contains these three cemeteries: Prairie Lutheran, Saint Johns Lutheran and Salem.

=== Major highways ===
- U.S. Route 30
- U.S. Route 218

== School districts ==
- Benton Community School District

== Political districts ==
- Iowa's 3rd congressional district
- State House District 39
- State Senate District 20
