= Benton Township, Benton County, Iowa =

Township in Iowa, US

Benton Township
- Township
- Location in Benton County
- Coordinates: 42°09′14″N 91°53′07″W
- Country: United States
- State: Iowa
- County: Benton

Area
  - Total: 22.57 sq mi (58.46 km^{2})
  - Land: 22.39 sq mi (57.99 km^{2})
  - Water: 0.18 sq mi (0.47 km^{2}) 0.8%
- Elevation: 928 ft (283 m)

Population (2000)
  - Total: 900
  - Density: 40/sq mi (15.5/km^{2})
- Time zone: UTC-6 (CST)
  - Summer (DST): UTC-5 (CDT)
- ZIP codes: 52332, 52349
- GNIS feature ID: 0467440

Benton Township is one of twenty townships in Benton County, Iowa, United States. As of the 2000 census its population was 900.

== History ==
Benton Township was founded in 1846.

== Geography ==
According to the United States Census Bureau, Benton Township covers an area of 22.57 square miles (58.46 square kilometers); of this, 22.39 square miles (57.99 square kilometers, 99.2 percent) is land and 0.18 square miles (0.47 square kilometers, 0.8 percent) is water.

=== Extinct towns ===
- Benton City at 42.158328°N 91.933791°W

(These towns are listed as "historical" by the USGS.)

- Civil Bend

=== Adjacent townships ===
- Polk Township (north)
- Washington Township, Linn County (east)
- Fayette Township, Linn County (southeast)
- Canton Township (south)
- Eden Township (southwest)
- Taylor Township (west)

=== Cemeteries ===
The township contains McBroom Cemetery.

=== Lakes ===
- Ice House Lake

=== Landmarks ===
- Pleasant Creek State Par (north edge)

== School districts ==
- Center Point–Urbana Community School District
- Vinton-Shellsburg Community School District

== Political districts ==
- Iowa's 3rd congressional district
- State House District 39
- State Senate District 20
