= Taylor Township, Benton County, Iowa =

Township in Iowa, US

Taylor Township
- Township
- Location in Benton County
- Coordinates: 42°10′19″N 92°00′04″W
- Country: United States
- State: Iowa
- County: Benton

Area
  - Total: 36.70 sq mi (95.04 km^{2})
  - Land: 36.14 sq mi (93.59 km^{2})
  - Water: 0.56 sq mi (1.46 km^{2}) 1.54%
- Elevation: 768 ft (234 m)

Population (2000)
  - Total: 781
  - Density: 21/sq mi (8.3/km^{2})
- Time zone: UTC-6 (CST)
  - Summer (DST): UTC-5 (CDT)
- ZIP code: 52349
- GNIS feature ID: 0468783

Taylor Township is one of twenty townships in Benton County, Iowa, United States. As of the 2000 census, its population was 781.

== History ==
Taylor Township was founded in 1846.

== Geography ==
According to the United States Census Bureau, Taylor Township covers an area of 36.7 square miles (95.04 square kilometers); of this, 36.13 square miles (93.59 square kilometers, 98.47 percent) is land and 0.56 square miles (1.46 square kilometers, 1.54 percent) is water.

The city of Vinton is entirely within this township geographically but is a separate entity.

=== Adjacent townships ===
- Harrison Township (north)
- Polk Township (northeast)
- Benton Township (east)
- Canton Township (southeast)
- Eden Township (south)
- Big Grove Township (southwest)
- Jackson Township (west)
- Vinton Township (west)
- Cedar Township (northwest)

=== Cemeteries ===
The township contains these five cemeteries: Maplewood, Pettit Hill, Plum Grove, Saint Marys and United Brethren.

=== Major highways ===
- U.S. Route 218
- Iowa Highway 150

=== Airports and landing strips ===
- Vinton Veterans Memorial Airpark

== School districts ==
- Vinton-Shellsburg Community School District

== Political districts ==
- Iowa's 3rd congressional district
- State House District 39
- State Senate District 20
