= Jackson Township, Benton County, Iowa =

Township in Iowa, US

Jackson Township
- Township
- Location in Benton County
- Coordinates: 42°10′02″N 92°06′57″W
- Country: United States
- State: Iowa
- County: Benton

Area
  - Total: 36.04 sq mi (93.35 km^{2})
  - Land: 36.00 sq mi (93.24 km^{2})
  - Water: 0.042 sq mi (0.11 km^{2}) 0.12%
- Elevation: 922 ft (281 m)

Population (2000)
  - Total: 710
  - Density: 20/sq mi (7.6/km^{2})
- Time zone: UTC-6 (CST)
  - Summer (DST): UTC-5 (CDT)
- ZIP codes: 52229, 52349
- GNIS feature ID: 0468091

Jackson Township is one of twenty townships in Benton County, Iowa, United States. As of the 2000 census, its population was 710.

== History ==
Jackson Township was founded in 1848.

== Geography ==
According to the United States Census Bureau, Jackson Township covers an area of 36.04 square miles (93.35 square kilometers); of this, 36 square miles (93.24 square kilometers, 99.88 percent) is land and 0.04 square miles (0.11 square kilometers, 0.12 percent) is water.

=== Cities, towns, villages ===
- Garrison

=== Extinct towns ===
- Benton Station at 42.145272°N 92.144628°W

(These towns are listed as "historical" by the USGS.)

=== Adjacent townships ===
- Cedar Township (north)
- Taylor Township (east)
- Eden Township (southeast)
- Big Grove Township (south)
- Homer Township (southwest)
- Monroe Township (west)
- Bruce Township (northwest)

=== Cemeteries ===
The township contains these three cemeteries: Carlisle Grove, Garrison and Pratt Creek.

=== Major highways ===
- U.S. Route 218

== School districts ==
- Vinton-Shellsburg Community School District

== Political districts ==
- Iowa's 3rd congressional district
- State House District 39
- State Senate District 20
