= Eden Township, Benton County, Iowa =

Township in Iowa, US

Eden Township
- Township
- Location in Benton County
- Coordinates: 42°04′58″N 92°00′12″W
- Country: United States
- State: Iowa
- County: Benton

Area
  - Total: 35.51 sq mi (91.97 km^{2})
  - Land: 35.51 sq mi (91.97 km^{2})
  - Water: 0 sq mi (0 km^{2}) 0%
- Elevation: 912 ft (278 m)

Population (2000)
  - Total: 275
  - Density: 7.8/sq mi (3/km^{2})
- Time zone: UTC-6 (CST)
  - Summer (DST): UTC-5 (CDT)
- ZIP codes: 52315, 52332, 52346, 52349
- GNIS feature ID: 0467760

Eden Township is one of twenty townships in Benton County, Iowa, United States. As of the 2000 census, its population was 275.

== History ==
Eden Township was founded in 1849.

== Geography ==
According to the United States Census Bureau, Eden Township covers an area of 35.51 square miles (91.97 square kilometers).

=== Unincorporated towns ===
- Eden at 42.109163°N 91.969625°W

(This list is based on USGS data and may include former settlements.)

=== Adjacent townships ===
- Taylor Township (north)
- Benton Township (northeast)
- Canton Township (east)
- Fremont Township (southeast)
- Eldorado Township (south)
- Union Township (southwest)
- Big Grove Township (west)
- Jackson Township (northwest)

=== Cemeteries ===
The township contains these two cemeteries: Bellar and First Eden.

=== Major highways ===
- U.S. Route 218

== School districts ==
- Benton Community School District
- Vinton-Shellsburg Community School District

== Political districts ==
- Iowa's 3rd congressional district
- State House District 39
- State Senate District 20
