= Big Grove Township, Benton County, Iowa =

Township in Iowa, US

Big Grove Township
- Township
- Location in Benton County
- Coordinates: 42°04′48″N 92°07′36″W
- Country: United States
- State: Iowa
- County: Benton

Area
  - Total: 35.93 sq mi (93.07 km^{2})
  - Land: 35.93 sq mi (93.07 km^{2})
  - Water: 0 sq mi (0 km^{2}) 0%
- Elevation: 896 ft (273 m)

Population (2000)
  - Total: 230
  - Density: 6.5/sq mi (2.5/km^{2})
- Time zone: UTC-6 (CST)
  - Summer (DST): UTC-5 (CDT)
- ZIP codes: 52229, 52249, 52346, 52349
- GNIS feature ID: 0467452

Big Grove Township is one of twenty townships in Benton County, Iowa, United States. As of the 2000 census, its population was 230.

== History ==
Big Grove Township was organized in 1856.

== Geography ==
According to the United States Census Bureau, Big Grove Township covers an area of 35.93 square miles (93.07 square kilometers).

=== Unincorporated towns ===
- Geneva at 42.11694°N 92.12435°W

(This list is based on USGS data and may include former settlements.)

=== Adjacent townships ===
- Jackson Township (north)
- Taylor Township (northeast)
- Eden Township (east)
- Eldorado Township (southeast)
- Union Township (south)
- Kane Township (southwest)
- Homer Township (west)
- Monroe Township (northwest)

=== Cemeteries ===
The township contains these four cemeteries: Bishop Grove, Indian, LaRue and Van Metre.

== School districts ==
- Benton Community School District
- Vinton-Shellsburg Community School District

== Political districts ==
- Iowa's 3rd congressional district
- State House District 39
- State Senate District 20
