= Union Township, Benton County, Iowa =

Township in Iowa, US

Union Township
- Township
- Location in Benton County
- Coordinates: 41°59′21″N 92°07′04″W
- Country: United States
- State: Iowa
- County: Benton

Area
  - Total: 35.88 sq mi (92.92 km^{2})
  - Land: 35.88 sq mi (92.92 km^{2})
  - Water: 0 sq mi (0 km^{2}) 0%
- Elevation: 920 ft (280 m)

Population (2000)
  - Total: 996
  - Density: 28/sq mi (10.7/km^{2})
- Time zone: UTC-6 (CST)
  - Summer (DST): UTC-5 (CDT)
- ZIP codes: 52209, 52249, 52257, 52346
- GNIS feature ID: 0468808

Union Township is one of twenty townships in Benton County, Iowa, United States. As of the 2000 census, its population was 996.

== Geography ==
According to the United States Census Bureau, Union Township covers an area of 35.88 square miles (92.92 square kilometers).

=== Cities, towns, villages ===
- Van Horne

=== Adjacent townships ===
- Big Grove Township (north)
- Eden Township (northeast)
- Eldorado Township (east)
- St. Clair Township (southeast)
- Leroy Township (south)
- Iowa Township (southwest)
- Kane Township (west)
- Homer Township (northwest)

=== Cemeteries ===
The township contains these two cemeteries: Bender and Calvary Catholic.

=== Major highways ===
- U.S. Route 30

== School districts ==
- Benton Community School District

== Political districts ==
- Iowa's 3rd congressional district
- State House District 39
- State Senate District 20
