= IA8 =

IA8 may refer to:

- Iowa's 8th congressional district
- Iowa Highway 8
