= Harrison Township, Benton County, Iowa =

Township in Iowa, US

Harrison Township
- Township
- Location in Benton County
- Coordinates: 42°15′12″N 91°59′19″W
- Country: United States
- State: Iowa
- County: Benton

Area
  - Total: 27.05 sq mi (70.07 km^{2})
  - Land: 26.57 sq mi (68.81 km^{2})
  - Water: 0.48 sq mi (1.25 km^{2}) 1.78%
- Elevation: 810 ft (247 m)

Population (2000)
  - Total: 354
  - Density: 13/sq mi (5.1/km^{2})
- Time zone: UTC-6 (CST)
  - Summer (DST): UTC-5 (CDT)
- ZIP code: 52349
- GNIS feature ID: 0468010

Harrison Township is one of twenty townships in Benton County, Iowa, United States. As of the 2000 census, its population was 354.

== History ==
Harrison Township was founded in 1849.

== Geography ==
According to the United States Census Bureau, Harrison Township covers an area of 27.05 square miles (70.07 square kilometers); of this, 26.57 square miles (68.81 square kilometers, 98.2 percent) is land and 0.48 square miles (1.25 square kilometers, 1.78 percent) is water.

=== Adjacent townships ===
- Jefferson Township, Buchanan County (north)
- Homer Township, Buchanan County (northeast)
- Polk Township (east)
- Taylor Township (south)
- Cedar Township (west)

=== Cemeteries ===
The township contains Bear Creek Cemetery.

=== Major highways ===
- Interstate 380
- Iowa Highway 150

=== Landmarks ===
- Minne Estema Park
- Mount Auburn Bridge Park

== School districts ==
- Independence Community School District
- Vinton-Shellsburg Community School District

== Political districts ==
- Iowa's 1st congressional district
- State House District 75
- State Senate District 38
