= Irving, Iowa =

- Unincorporated community
- Location within Iowa
- Coordinates: 41°56′54″N 92°17′43″W
- Country: United States
- State: Iowa
- County: Benton
- Elevation: 856 ft (261 m)
- Time zone: UTC-6 (Central (CST))
  - Summer (DST): UTC-5 (CDT)
- Area code: 319
- GNIS feature ID: 457854

Irving is an unincorporated community in Benton County, in the U.S. state of Iowa.

== History ==
The community was named in the 1850s for author Washington Irving. The population was estimated at 100 in 1940.
