= Mildred Armstrong Kalish =

American writer

- Born: March 17, 1922; Garrison, Iowa, U.S.
- Died: May 24, 2023 (aged 101)
- Education: Cedar Falls Teacher's College; University of Iowa (M.A.)
- Employer: Suffolk County Community College

Mildred Armstrong Kalish (March 17, 1922-May 24, 2023) was an American writer. Her 2007 memoir Little Heathens: Hard Times and High Spirits on an Iowa Farm During the Great Depression, about her childhood on a small family farm, was named one of the ten best books of year by The New York Times Book Review.

== Life ==
Kalish was born in Garrison, Iowa. She attended Cedar Falls Teacher’s College (now the University of Northern Iowa). After graduation, she worked as a governess in Yonkers, New York beginning in 1942. However, within the year she began serving as a radioman in the Coast Guard Women's Reserve, where she met Harry Kalish. The two married in 1944. They both attended the University of Iowa on the GI Bill, where she earned a Master's in English.

She taught literature and writing at Suffolk County Community College, while her husband chaired the Psychology department at nearby Stony Brook University. They had two children.

Kalish began writing a memoir in 2000, initially inspired by telling stories of her childhood to her grandchild. Little Heathens was positively reviewed, with The New York Times' Elizabeth Gilbert writing that "her terrifically soaring love for those childhood memories saturates this book with pure charm, while coaxing the reader into the most unexpected series of sensations: joy, affection, wonder and even envy." After publishing her book, Kalish spent the next decade touring in Iowa and California.

In 2022, Women in Military Service for America Memorial Foundation gave Kalish a Living Legend Proclamation.
