= Cedar Rapids metropolitan area, Iowa =

Cedar Rapids, IA Cedar Rapids, IA Metropolitan Statistical Area
- Metropolitan Statistical Area
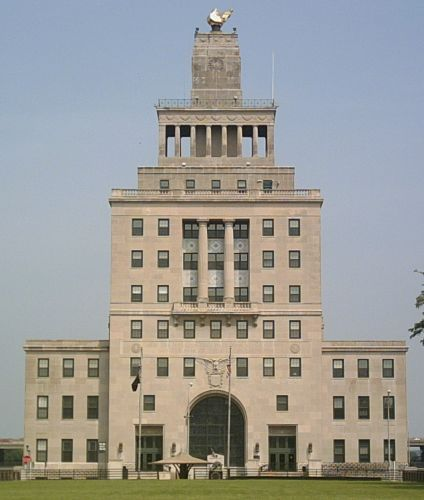
- Veterans Memorial Building
Interactive Map of Cedar Rapids–Iowa City, IA CSA
City of Cedar Rapids
Cedar Rapids, IA MSA
Iowa City
Iowa City, IA MSA
- Country: United States
- State: Iowa
- Principal city: Cedar Rapids
- Other city: Marion

Area
  - Total: 2,020 sq mi (5,230 km^{2})

Population
  - Total: 276,520

GDP
  - Total: $34.909 billion (2022)
- Time zone: UTC−6 (CST)
  - Summer (DST): UTC−5 (CDT)

The Cedar Rapids Metropolitan Statistical Area, as defined by the United States Census Bureau, is an area consisting of three counties in Iowa, anchored by the city of Cedar Rapids. As of the 2020 census, the MSA had a population of 276,520.

The Cedar Rapids MSA is part of a Combined Statistical Area (CSA) with the Iowa City MSA, forming the Cedar Rapids–Iowa City, IA CSA. The area is marketed regionally as Iowa City-Cedar Rapids (ICR), or the "Corridor" (referring to the Interstate 380 corridor) which includes both the Cedar Rapids and Iowa City metropolitan areas and several surrounding counties.

== Definitions ==
=== Metropolitan Statistical Area ===
County	Seat	2025 estimate	2020 census	Change	Area	Density
Linn	Cedar Rapids	232,028	230,299	+0.75%	725 sq mi (1,880 km^{2})	320/sq mi (124/km^{2})
Benton	Vinton	26,004	25,575	+1.68%	718 sq mi (1,860 km^{2})	36/sq mi (14/km^{2})
Jones	Anamosa	21,253	20,646	+2.94%	577 sq mi (1,490 km^{2})	37/sq mi (14/km^{2})
Total		279,285	276,520	+1.00%	2,020 sq mi (5,200 km^{2})	138/sq mi (53/km^{2})

=== Combined Statistical Area ===
The Cedar Rapids–Iowa City, IA Combined Statistical Area is made up of five counties in Iowa. The statistical area includes the Cedar Rapids, IA Metropolitan Statistical Area and the Iowa City, IA Metropolitan Statistical Area.

Statistical Area	2025 Estimate	2020 Census	Change	Area	Density
Cedar Rapids, IA Metropolitan Statistical Area	279,285	276,520	+1.00%	2,020 sq mi (5,200 km^{2})	138/sq mi (53/km^{2})
Iowa City, IA Metropolitan Statistical Area	182,711	175,419	+4.16%	1,194 sq mi (3,090 km^{2})	153/sq mi (59/km^{2})
Total	461,996	451,939	+2.23%	3,214 sq mi (8,320 km^{2})	144/sq mi (56/km^{2})

== Communities ==
The following are cities and towns in the Cedar Rapids, IA Metropolitan Statistical Area categorized based on the United States Census Bureau 2025 population estimates. No population estimates are released for census-designated places (CDPs), which are marked with an asterisk (*). These places are categorized based on their 2020 Census population.

Principal city

- Cedar Rapids (137,935)

Places with 10,000 to 50,000 inhabitants

- Marion (42,732)

Places with 5,000 to 9,999 inhabitants

- Hiawatha (7,432)
- Anamosa (5,901)
- Vinton (5,004)

Places with 1,000 to 4,999 inhabitants

- Mount Vernon (4,514)
- Monticello (4,104)
- Robins (3,366)
- Fairfax (2,925)
- Center Point (2,572)
- Cascade (partial) (2,399)
- Ely (2,366)
- Belle Plaine (2,346)
- Lisbon (2,239)
- Atkins (2,203)
- Urbana (1,671)
- Palo (1,551)
- Walford (1,359)
- Central City (1,253)
- Springville (1,160)

Places with fewer than 1,000 inhabitants

- Shellsburg (997)
- Newhall (906)
- Van Horne (769)
- Blairstown (709)
- Coggon (688)
- Alburnett (675)
- Walker (674)
- Olin (656)
- Keystone (617)
- Wyoming (530)
- Norway (470)
- Oxford Junction (428)
- Garrison (353)
- Bertram (267)
- Martelle (249)
- Onslow (197)
- Stone City* (186)
- Mount Auburn (160)
- Prairieburg (156)
- Watkins* (116)
- Luzerne (113)
- Center Junction* (100)
- Morley (94)

== Demographics ==
Historical population
Census	Pop.	Note	%±
1900	55,392		—
1910	60,720		9.6%
1920	74,004		21.9%
1930	82,336		11.3%
1940	89,142		8.3%
1950	104,274		17.0%
1960	181,014		73.6%
1970	205,966		13.8%
1980	213,825		3.8%
1990	210,640		−1.5%
2000	237,230		12.6%
2010	257,940		8.7%
2020	276,520		7.2%
U.S. Decennial Census

As of the census of 2010, there were 257,940 people, 104,617 households, and 67,059 families residing within the MSA. The racial makeup of the MSA was 92.0% White, 3.4% African American, 0.3% Native American, 1.5% Asian, 0.1% Pacific Islander, 0.6% from other races, and 2.1% from two or more races. Hispanic or Latino of any race were 2.4% of the population.

According to the 2010 American Community Survey 1-Year Estimates, the median income for a household in the MSA was $53,755, and the median income for a family was $67,506. Males had a median income of $47,371 versus $36,167 for females. The per capita income for the MSA was $27,553.

== See also ==
- Iowa census statistical areas
- Cedar Rapids, IA
