= Blairstown, Iowa =

- City
- Nickname: B-Town
- Location of Blairstown, Iowa
- Coordinates: 41°54′25″N 92°5′0″W
- Country: United States
- State: Iowa
- County: Benton

Area
  - Total: 0.49 sq mi (1.28 km^{2})
  - Land: 0.49 sq mi (1.28 km^{2})
  - Water: 0 sq mi (0.00 km^{2})
- Elevation: 840 ft (256 m)

Population (2020)
  - Total: 713
  - Density: 1,438.2/sq mi (555.29/km^{2})
- Time zone: UTC-6 (Central (CST))
  - Summer (DST): UTC-5 (CDT)
- ZIP code: 52209
- Area code: 319
- FIPS code: 19-06805
- GNIS feature ID: 0454677

Blairstown is a city in Benton County, Iowa, United States. The population was 713 at the 2020 census. It is part of the Cedar Rapids Metropolitan Statistical Area.

== History ==
Blairstown was surveyed in the spring of 1862 by George F. Kirby who also surveyed Belle Plaine. It was platted and the plat filed for record on 12 May 1862, the same day as Belle Plaine. It was named for its proprietor and railroad magnate, John Insley Blair who also founded Belle Plaine.

== Geography ==
According to the United States Census Bureau, the city has a total area of 0.52 square miles (1.35 km^{2}), all land.

== Demographics ==
Historical populations
Year	Pop.	±%
1870	682	—
1880	652	−4.4%
1890	583	−10.6%
1900	592	+1.5%
1910	532	−10.1%
1920	540	+1.5%
1930	488	−9.6%
1940	525	+7.6%
1950	523	−0.4%
1960	583	+11.5%
1970	612	+5.0%
1980	695	+13.6%
1990	672	−3.3%
2000	682	+1.5%
2010	692	+1.5%
2020	713	+3.0%
Source:"U.S. Census website". United States Census Bureau. and Iowa Data Center; Source: U.S. Decennial Census

=== 2020 census ===
As of the census of 2020, there were 713 people, 300 households, and 192 families residing in the city. The population density was 1,438.2 inhabitants per square mile (555.3/km^{2}). There were 314 housing units at an average density of 633.4 per square mile (244.5/km^{2}). The racial makeup of the city was 88.8% White, 0.3% Black or African American, 0.1% Native American, 0.0% Asian, 0.0% Pacific Islander, 3.4% from other races and 7.4% from two or more races. Hispanic or Latino persons of any race comprised 10.2% of the population.

Of the 300 households, 28.0% of which had children under the age of 18 living with them, 47.0% were married couples living together, 8.3% were cohabitating couples, 23.7% had a female householder with no spouse or partner present and 21.0% had a male householder with no spouse or partner present. 36.0% of all households were non-families. 29.7% of all households were made up of individuals, 14.7% had someone living alone who was 65 years old or older.

The median age in the city was 36.2 years. 27.8% of the residents were under the age of 20; 5.5% were between the ages of 20 and 24; 27.2% were from 25 and 44; 23.6% were from 45 and 64; and 16.0% were 65 years of age or older. The gender makeup of the city was 51.1% male and 48.9% female.

=== 2010 census ===
As of the census of 2010, there were 692 people, 295 households, and 199 families living in the city. The population density was 1,330.8 inhabitants per square mile (513.8/km^{2}). There were 314 housing units at an average density of 603.8 per square mile (233.1/km^{2}). The racial makeup of the city was 97.8% White, 0.7% African American, 0.1% Native American, 0.1% Asian, 1.0% from other races, and 0.1% from two or more races. Hispanic or Latino of any race were 4.3% of the population.

There were 295 households, of which 33.2% had children under the age of 18 living with them, 53.2% were married couples living together, 7.1% had a female householder with no husband present, 7.1% had a male householder with no wife present, and 32.5% were non-families. 28.1% of all households were made up of individuals, and 14.3% had someone living alone who was 65 years of age or older. The average household size was 2.35 and the average family size was 2.79.

The median age in the city was 39 years. 25.7% of residents were under the age of 18; 7.1% were between the ages of 18 and 24; 25.6% were from 25 to 44; 24.7% were from 45 to 64; and 17.1% were 65 years of age or older. The gender makeup of the city was 50.1% male and 49.9% female.

=== 2000 census ===
As of the census of 2000, there were 682 people, 289 households, and 195 families living in the city. The population density was 1,434.7 inhabitants per square mile (553.9/km^{2}). There were 309 housing units at an average density of 650.0 per square mile (251.0/km^{2}). The racial makeup of the city was 99.41% White, 0.15% from other races, and 0.44% from two or more races. Hispanic or Latino of any race were 0.29% of the population.

There were 289 households, out of which 30.1% had children under the age of 18 living with them, 57.4% were married couples living together, 8.3% had a female householder with no husband present, and 32.2% were non-families. 28.7% of all households were made up of individuals, and 16.3% had someone living alone who was 65 years of age or older. The average household size was 2.36 and the average family size was 2.87.

24.8% are under the age of 18, 6.5% from 18 to 24, 27.1% from 25 to 44, 19.2% from 45 to 64, and 22.4% who were 65 years of age or older. The median age was 39 years. For every 100 females, there were 86.3 males. For every 100 females age 18 and over, there were 86.5 males.

The median income for a household in the city was $40,662, and the median income for a family was $47,778. Males had a median income of $36,705 versus $22,083 for females. The per capita income for the city was $16,828. About 5.9% of families and 11.0% of the population were below the poverty line, including 17.5% of those under age 18 and 11.6% of those age 65 or over.

== Arts and culture ==
Blairstown holds an annual "Sauerkraut Days" celebration.

=== Rolle Bolle ===
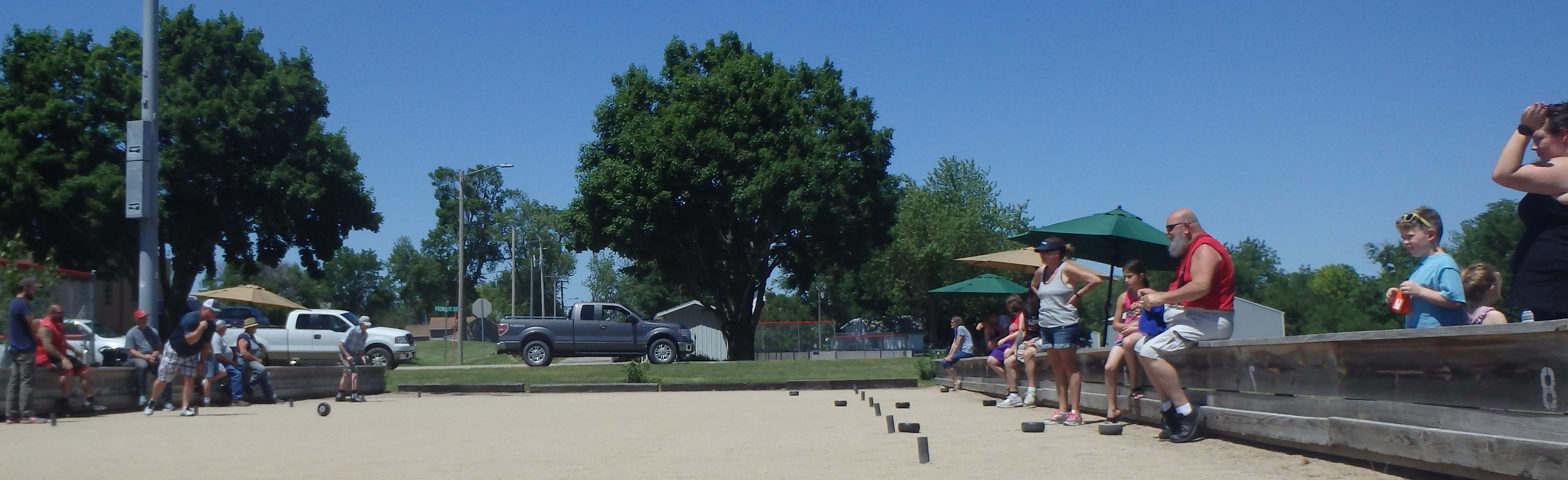
People playing and watching Rolle Bolle in Blairstown, June 2019.

Many Blairstown residents still play the Belgian yard game Rolle Bolle (called krulbollen in Belgium), first brought to the region by Belgian immigrants in the late 19th and early 20th centuries. Blairstown's courts are located in the Blairstown Ball Park. A game of Rolle Bolle is part of the annual Sauerkraut Days celebration. Rolle Bolle is also played in the nearby towns of Belle Plaine, Clutier, Victor, Marengo, and Ladora.

== Education ==
Benton Community School District operates local public schools.

== See also ==
- List of cities in Iowa
