= Walford, Iowa =

- City
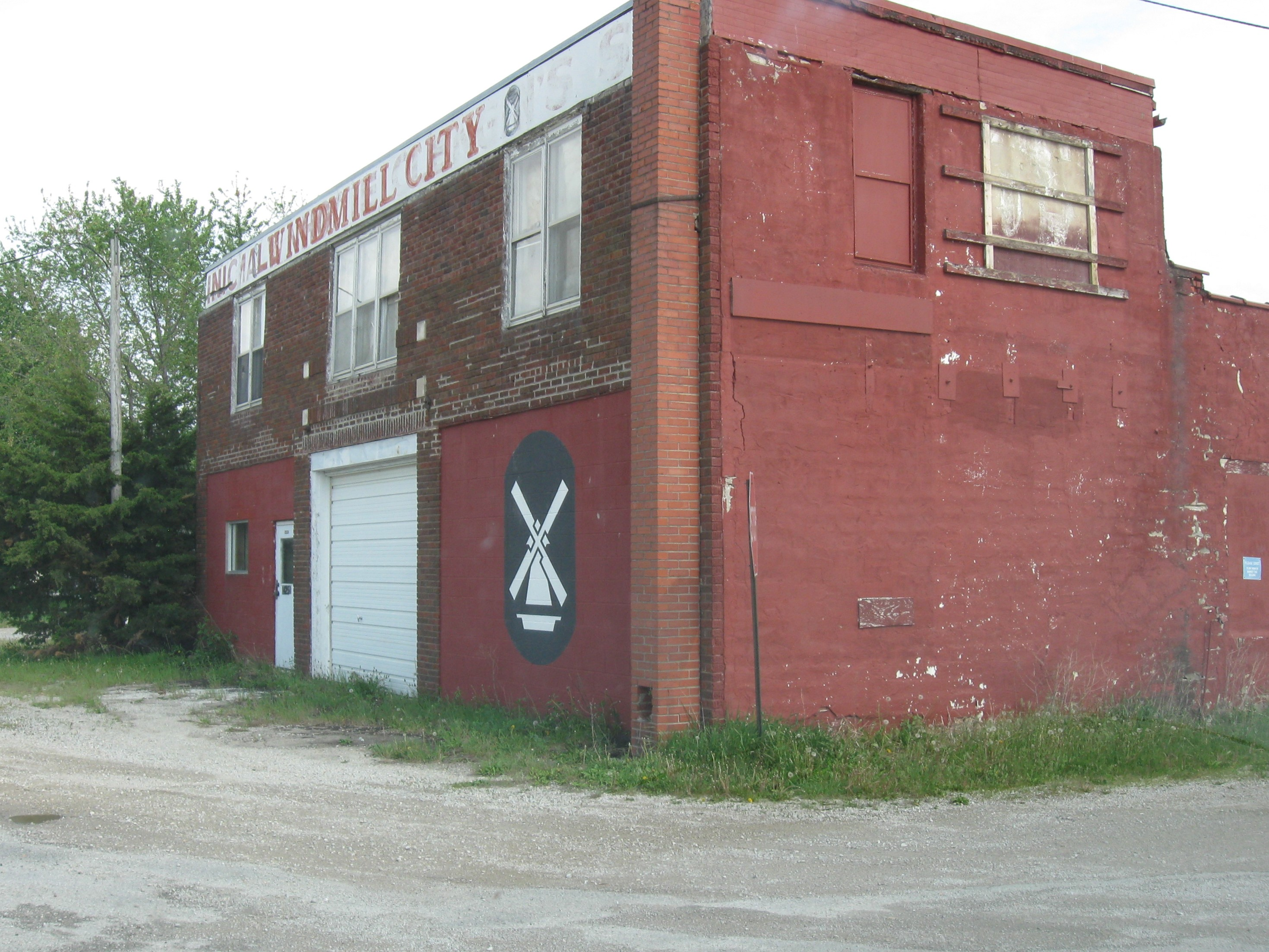
- Building in Walford in May 2009

- Location of Walford, Iowa
- Coordinates: 41°52′34″N 91°50′03″W
- Country: United States
- State: Iowa
- Counties: Benton, Linn

Government
  - Type: Mayor Council

Area
  - Total: 1.04 sq mi (2.69 km^{2})
  - Land: 1.04 sq mi (2.69 km^{2})
  - Water: 0 sq mi (0.00 km^{2})
- Elevation: 794 ft (242 m)

Population (2020)
  - Total: 1,366
  - Density: 1,313.0/sq mi (506.94/km^{2})
- Time zone: UTC-6 (Central (CST))
  - Summer (DST): UTC-5 (CDT)
- ZIP code: 52351
- Area code: 319
- FIPS code: 19-81840
- GNIS feature ID: 2397173
- Website: http://www.cityofwalford.com

Walford is a city in Benton and Linn counties in the U.S. state of Iowa. The population was 1,366 at the time of the 2020 census. It is part of the Cedar Rapids Metropolitan Statistical Area.

== History ==
Walford was originally called Terry, and under the latter name was laid out in the year 1884 when the Chicago, Milwaukee and St. Paul Railroad was extended to that point. In 1889, the town's name was changed to Walford, primarily at the behest of the U.S. Postal Service due to the similarity of names between Terry and Perry, Iowa. In 1897, Walford gained national attention when the general store burned down, leaving a charred corpse; since two men were missing, news stories about the identity of the corpse and the hunt for the survivor made the headlines for weeks.

== Geography ==
According to the United States Census Bureau, the city has a total area of 1.11 square miles (2.87 km^{2}), all land.

=== Climate ===
This region has significant seasonal temperature differences, going from warm summers to very cold winters. There is precipitation year-round. Most summer rainfall occurs during thunderstorms and during a very occasional tropical system.

Climate data for Walford, Iowa
Month	Jan	Feb	Mar	Apr	May	Jun	Jul	Aug	Sep	Oct	Nov	Dec	Year
Mean daily maximum °C (°F)	−2 (28)	1 (33)	8 (46)	17 (62)	22 (72)	27 (81)	29 (85)	28 (83)	24 (76)	18 (64)	8 (47)	0 (32)	15 (59)
Mean daily minimum °C (°F)	−12 (10)	−9 (15)	−3 (26)	3 (38)	9 (49)	14 (58)	17 (62)	16 (60)	11 (51)	5 (41)	−2 (28)	−9 (16)	3 (38)
Average precipitation days	1.1	1.0	2.1	3.4	4.2	4.4	3.9	3.7	3.4	2.4	1.8	1.4	32.7
Source: Weatherbase

== Demographics ==
Historical populations
Year	Pop.	±%
1960	264	—
1970	286	+8.3%
1980	285	−0.3%
1990	303	+6.3%
2000	1,224	+304.0%
2010	1,463	+19.5%
2020	1,366	−6.6%
Source:"U.S. Census website". United States Census Bureau. and Iowa Data Center; Source: U.S. Decennial Census

=== 2020 census ===
As of the 2020 census, Walford had a population of 1,366, with 485 households and 403 families. The population density was 1,313.0 inhabitants per square mile (506.9/km^{2}). There were 497 housing units at an average density of 477.7 per square mile (184.4/km^{2}).

The median age was 40.1 years. 27.8% of residents were under the age of 18 and 10.3% were 65 years of age or older. 30.2% of residents were under the age of 20; 4.6% were from 20 to 24; 21.0% were from 25 to 44; and 33.9% were from 45 to 64. For every 100 females, there were 109.2 males, and for every 100 females age 18 and over there were 102.5 males age 18 and over. The gender makeup of the city was 52.2% male and 47.8% female.

Of the 485 households, 40.4% had children under the age of 18 living with them. 72.6% were married-couple households, 4.7% were cohabitating couples, 12.0% had a female householder with no spouse or partner present, and 10.7% had a male householder with no spouse or partner present. 16.9% of households were non-families, 14.0% of all households were made up of individuals, and 5.4% had someone living alone who was 65 years old or older.

There were 497 housing units, of which 2.4% were vacant. The homeowner vacancy rate was 1.1% and the rental vacancy rate was 11.4%. 0.0% of residents lived in urban areas, while 100.0% lived in rural areas.

Racial composition as of the 2020 census
Race	Number	Percent
White	1,289	94.4%
Black or African American	5	0.4%
American Indian and Alaska Native	0	0.0%
Asian	4	0.3%
Native Hawaiian and Other Pacific Islander	0	0.0%
Some other race	7	0.5%
Two or more races	61	4.5%
Hispanic or Latino (of any race)	25	1.8%

=== 2010 census ===
As of the census of 2010, there were 1,463 people, 479 households, and 414 families living in the city. The population density was 1,318.0 inhabitants per square mile (508.9/km^{2}). There were 492 housing units at an average density of 443.2 per square mile (171.1/km^{2}). The racial makeup of the city was 98.6% White, 0.1% African American, 0.1% Native American, 0.3% Asian, 0.1% from other races, and 0.8% from two or more races. Hispanic or Latino of any race were 0.6% of the population.

There were 479 households, of which 52.0% had children under the age of 18 living with them, 75.6% were married couples living together, 7.3% had a female householder with no husband present, 3.5% had a male householder with no wife present, and 13.6% were non-families. 10.0% of all households were made up of individuals, and 2.8% had someone living alone who was 65 years of age or older. The average household size was 3.05 and the average family size was 3.29.

The median age in the city was 35.1 years. 33.4% of residents were under the age of 18; 5.6% were between the ages of 18 and 24; 30.4% were from 25 to 44; 25.3% were from 45 to 64; and 5.3% were 65 years of age or older. The gender makeup of the city was 51.4% male and 48.6% female.

=== 2000 census ===
As of the census of 2000, there were 1,224 people, 389 households, and 348 families living in the city. The population density was 1,276.8 inhabitants per square mile (493.0/km^{2}). There were 399 housing units at an average density of 416.2 per square mile (160.7/km^{2}). The racial makeup of the city was 98.94% White, 0.25% African American, 0.08% Native American, 0.16% Asian, and 0.57% from two or more races. Hispanic or Latino of any race were 0.08% of the population.

There were 389 households, out of which 56.6% had children under the age of 18 living with them, 81.2% were married couples living together, 6.2% had a female householder with no husband present, and 10.5% were non-families. 8.2% of all households were made up of individuals, and 3.6% had someone living alone who was 65 years of age or older. The average household size was 3.14 and the average family size was 3.35.

36.4% were under the age of 18, 5.4% from 18 to 24, 39.8% from 25 to 44, 14.1% from 45 to 64, and 4.3% were 65 years of age or older. The median age was 31 years. For every 100 females, there were 100.3 males. For every 100 females age 18 and over, there were 94.3 males.

The median income for a household in the city was $67,833, and the median income for a family was $70,000. Males had a median income of $42,197 versus $27,188 for females. The per capita income for the city was $21,370. None of the families and 0.4% of the population were living below the poverty line, including no under eighteens and none of those over 64.
