= Mount Auburn, Iowa =

- City
- Location of Mount Auburn, Iowa
- Coordinates: 42°15′26″N 92°5′34″W
- Country: United States
- State: Iowa
- County: Benton

Area
  - Total: 0.25 sq mi (0.64 km^{2})
  - Land: 0.25 sq mi (0.64 km^{2})
  - Water: 0 sq mi (0.00 km^{2})
- Elevation: 879 ft (268 m)

Population (2020)
  - Total: 162
  - Density: 658.4/sq mi (254.21/km^{2})
- Time zone: UTC-6 (Central (CST))
  - Summer (DST): UTC-5 (CDT)
- ZIP code: 52313
- Area code: 319
- FIPS code: 19-54435
- GNIS feature ID: 0459272
- Website: mountauburnia.com

Mount Auburn is a city in Benton County, Iowa, United States. The population was 162 at the time of the 2020 census. It is part of the Cedar Rapids Metropolitan Statistical Area.

== History ==
Mount Auburn was platted in 1871 when the Burlington, Cedar Rapids and Minnesota Railway was extended to that point.

== Geography ==
According to the United States Census Bureau, the city has a total area of 0.28 square miles (0.73 km^{2}), all land.

== Demographics ==
Historical populations
Year	Pop.	±%
1910	228	—
1920	249	+9.2%
1930	196	−21.3%
1940	223	+13.8%
1950	216	−3.1%
1960	186	−13.9%
1970	200	+7.5%
1980	188	−6.0%
1990	134	−28.7%
2000	160	+19.4%
2010	150	−6.2%
2020	162	+8.0%
Source:"U.S. Census website". United States Census Bureau. and Iowa Data Center; Source: U.S. Decennial Census

=== 2020 census ===
As of the census of 2020, there were 162 people, 61 households, and 50 families residing in the city. The population density was 658.4 inhabitants per square mile (254.2/km^{2}). There were 68 housing units at an average density of 276.4 per square mile (106.7/km^{2}). The racial makeup of the city was 93.8% White, 0.0% Black or African American, 2.5% Native American, 1.2% Asian, 0.0% Pacific Islander, 0.0% from other races and 2.5% from two or more races. Hispanic or Latino persons of any race comprised 2.5% of the population.

Of the 61 households, 47.5% of which had children under the age of 18 living with them, 65.6% were married couples living together, 6.6% were cohabitating couples, 11.5% had a female householder with no spouse or partner present and 16.4% had a male householder with no spouse or partner present. 18.0% of all households were non-families. 18.0% of all households were made up of individuals, 6.6% had someone living alone who was 65 years old or older.

The median age in the city was 40.4 years. 24.7% of the residents were under the age of 20; 6.8% were between the ages of 20 and 24; 25.3% were from 25 and 44; 27.8% were from 45 and 64; and 15.4% were 65 years of age or older. The gender makeup of the city was 51.9% male and 48.1% female.

=== 2010 census ===
As of the census of 2010, there were 150 people, 64 households, and 44 families living in the city. The population density was 535.7 inhabitants per square mile (206.8/km^{2}). There were 68 housing units at an average density of 242.9 per square mile (93.8/km^{2}). The racial makeup of the city was 98.0% White, 1.3% Native American, and 0.7% from two or more races. Hispanic or Latino of any race were 0.7% of the population.

There were 64 households, of which 31.3% had children under the age of 18 living with them, 60.9% were married couples living together, 4.7% had a female householder with no husband present, 3.1% had a male householder with no wife present, and 31.3% were non-families. 26.6% of all households were made up of individuals, and 12.6% had someone living alone who was 65 years of age or older. The average household size was 2.34 and the average family size was 2.89.

The median age in the city was 35 years. 24% of residents were under the age of 18; 9.3% were between the ages of 18 and 24; 22% were from 25 to 44; 28.7% were from 45 to 64; and 16% were 65 years of age or older. The gender makeup of the city was 54.0% male and 46.0% female.

=== 2000 census ===
As of the census of 2000, there were 160 people, 62 households, and 46 families living in the city. The population density was 598.5 inhabitants per square mile (231.1/km^{2}). There were 64 housing units at an average density of 239.4 per square mile (92.4/km^{2}). The racial makeup of the city was 91.88% White, 3.12% Native American, 1.25% Asian, and 3.75% from two or more races. Hispanic or Latino of any race were 0.62% of the population.

There were 62 households, out of which 32.3% had children under the age of 18 living with them, 67.7% were married couples living together, 3.2% had a female householder with no husband present, and 25.8% were non-families. 21.0% of all households were made up of individuals, and 12.9% had someone living alone who was 65 years of age or older. The average household size was 2.58 and the average family size was 3.04.

In the city, the population was spread out, with 24.4% under the age of 18, 6.3% from 18 to 24, 28.8% from 25 to 44, 21.3% from 45 to 64, and 19.4% who were 65 years of age or older. The median age was 40 years. For every 100 females, there were 97.5 males. For every 100 females age 18 and over, there were 98.4 males.

The median income for a household in the city was $39,250, and the median income for a family was $41,786. Males had a median income of $27,083 versus $22,917 for females. The per capita income for the city was $15,909. None of the population or families were below the poverty line.

== Education ==
Union Community School District serves the municipality. The district was established on July 1, 1993 by the merger of the La Porte City Community School District and the Dysart-Geneseo Community School District.
