= Dysart, Iowa =

- City
- Location of Dysart, Iowa
- Coordinates: 42°10′19″N 92°18′33″W
- Country: United States
- State: Iowa
- County: Tama

Area
  - Total: 1.25 sq mi (3.24 km^{2})
  - Land: 1.25 sq mi (3.24 km^{2})
  - Water: 0 sq mi (0.00 km^{2})
- Elevation: 974 ft (297 m)

Population (2020)
  - Total: 1,281
  - Density: 1,024.2/sq mi (395.45/km^{2})
- Time zone: UTC-6 (Central (CST))
  - Summer (DST): UTC-5 (CDT)
- ZIP code: 52224
- Area code: 319
- FIPS code: 19-23160
- GNIS feature ID: 2394585
- Website: www.cityofdysartia.com

Dysart (Note: /ˈdaɪzərt/) is a city in Tama County, Iowa, United States. The population was 1,281 at the 2020 census. The Mayor of Dysart is currently Tim Glenn.

== History ==
Dysart got its start in the year 1872, following construction of the Burlington, Cedar Rapids and Northern Railway through the territory. Dysart was platted in 1872. The town takes its name from Joseph Dysart, a farmer and founder of the town.

== Geography ==
According to the United States Census Bureau, the city has a total area of 1.25 square miles (3.24 km^{2}), all land.

== Demographics ==
Historical populations
Year	Pop.	±%
1880	516	—
1890	775	+50.2%
1900	902	+16.4%
1910	906	+0.4%
1920	955	+5.4%
1930	971	+1.7%
1940	986	+1.5%
1950	1,089	+10.4%
1960	1,197	+9.9%
1970	1,251	+4.5%
1980	1,355	+8.3%
1990	1,230	−9.2%
2000	1,303	+5.9%
2010	1,379	+5.8%
2020	1,281	−7.1%
Source:"U.S. Census website". United States Census Bureau. and Iowa Data Center; Source: U.S. Decennial Census

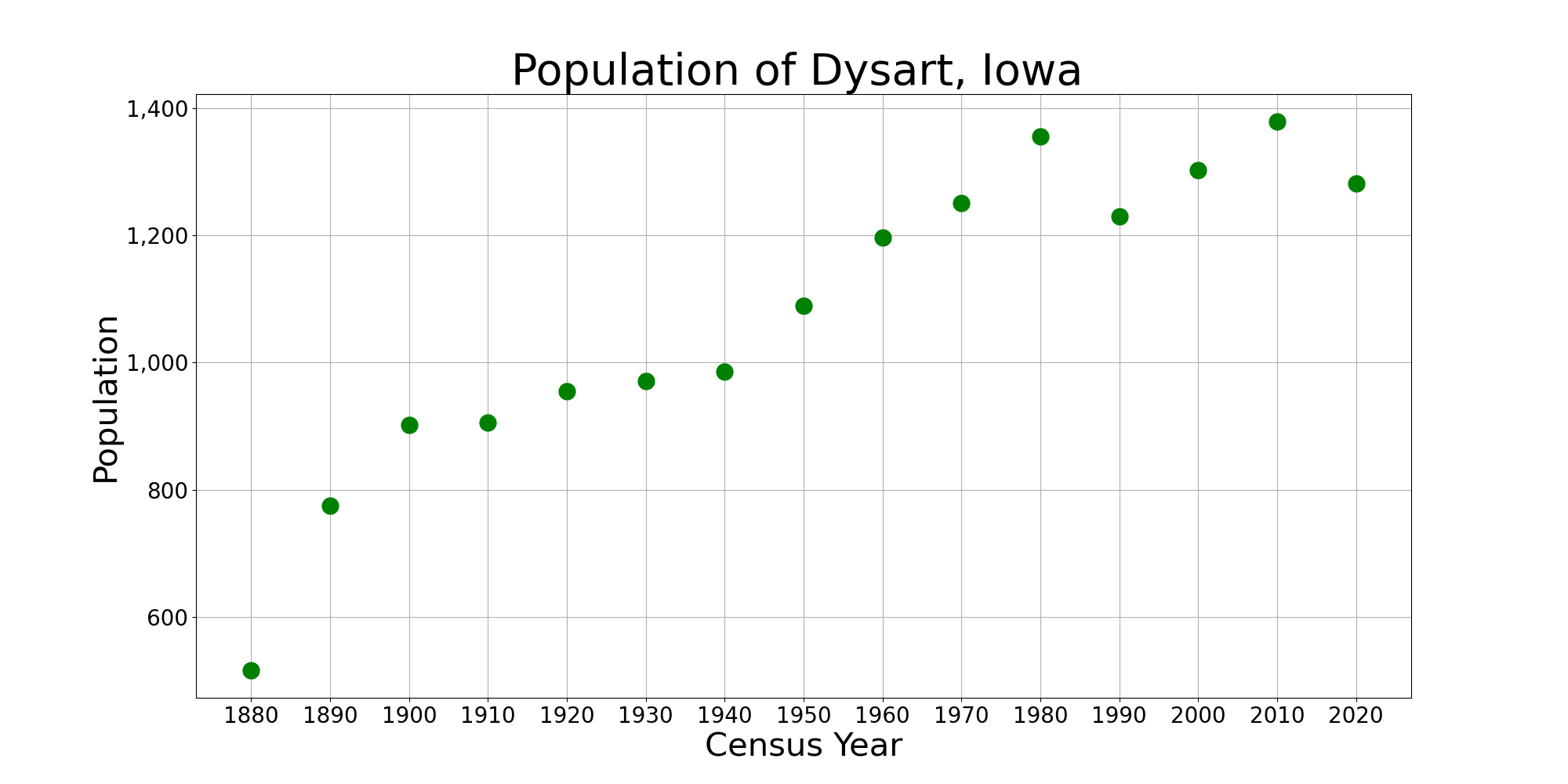
The population of Dysart, Iowa from US census data

=== 2020 census ===
As of the 2020 census, there were 1,281 people, 527 households, and 346 families residing in the city. The population density was 1,024.2 inhabitants per square mile (395.5/km^{2}).

There were 597 housing units at an average density of 477.3 per square mile (184.3/km^{2}). Of all housing units, 11.7% were vacant. The homeowner vacancy rate was 4.6% and the rental vacancy rate was 8.0%.

Of the 527 households, 28.8% had children under the age of 18 living with them, 53.5% were married couples living together, 3.6% were cohabitating couples, 24.7% had a female householder with no spouse or partner present, and 18.2% had a male householder with no spouse or partner present. 34.3% of households were non-families. 30.2% of all households were made up of individuals, and 14.4% had someone living alone who was 65 years old or older.

The median age in the city was 43.8 years. 24.1% of residents were under the age of 18, 26.0% were under the age of 20, 3.9% were between the ages of 20 and 24, 21.3% were from 25 to 44, 25.5% were from 45 to 64, and 23.3% were 65 years of age or older. The gender makeup of the city was 49.2% male and 50.8% female. For every 100 females there were 96.8 males, and for every 100 females age 18 and over there were 94.0 males age 18 and over.

0.0% of residents lived in urban areas, while 100.0% lived in rural areas.

Racial composition as of the 2020 census
Race	Number	Percent
White	1,227	95.8%
Black or African American	5	0.4%
American Indian and Alaska Native	1	0.1%
Asian	7	0.5%
Native Hawaiian and Other Pacific Islander	0	0.0%
Some other race	1	0.1%
Two or more races	40	3.1%
Hispanic or Latino (of any race)	16	1.2%

=== 2010 census ===
As of the census of 2010, there were 1,379 people, 544 households, and 380 families living in the city. The population density was 1,103.2 inhabitants per square mile (425.9/km^{2}). There were 598 housing units at an average density of 478.4 per square mile (184.7/km^{2}). The racial makeup of the city was 97.6% White, 0.5% African American, 0.1% Native American, 0.2% Asian, 0.4% from other races, and 1.2% from two or more races. Hispanic or Latino of any race were 1.5% of the population.

There were 544 households, of which 31.8% had children under the age of 18 living with them, 58.3% were married couples living together, 9.9% had a female householder with no husband present, 1.7% had a male householder with no wife present, and 30.1% were non-families. 24.8% of all households were made up of individuals, and 13.3% had someone living alone who was 65 years of age or older. The average household size was 2.47 and the average family size was 2.96.

The median age in the city was 42 years. 26% of residents were under the age of 18; 5.8% were between the ages of 18 and 24; 21.7% were from 25 to 44; 25.2% were from 45 to 64; and 21.4% were 65 years of age or older. The gender makeup of the city was 48.3% male and 51.7% female.

=== 2000 census ===
As of the census of 2000, there were 1,303 people, 529 households, and 358 families living in the city. The population density was 1,034.5 inhabitants per square mile (399.4/km^{2}). There were 571 housing units at an average density of 453.4 per square mile (175.1/km^{2}). The racial makeup of the city was 98.47% White, 0.31% African American, 0.31% Native American, 0.23% Asian, 0.23% Pacific Islander, 0.08% from other races, and 0.38% from two or more races. Hispanic or Latino of any race were 0.54% of the population.

There were 529 households, out of which 31.4% had children under the age of 18 living with them, 59.2% were married couples living together, 5.5% had a female householder with no husband present, and 32.3% were non-families. 29.9% of all households were made up of individuals, and 17.6% had someone living alone who was 65 years of age or older. The average household size was 2.37 and the average family size was 2.95.

25.5% were under the age of 18, 5.7% from 18 to 24, 23.8% from 25 to 44, 20.9% from 45 to 64, and 24.2% were 65 years of age or older. The median age was 42 years. For every 100 females, there were 92.2 males. For every 100 females age 18 and over, there were 85.0 males.

The median income for a household in the city was $40,857, and the median income for a family was $45,774. Males had a median income of $34,063 versus $22,368 for females. The per capita income for the city was $20,203. About 4.4% of families and 6.8% of the population were below the poverty line, including 10.2% of those under age 18 and 3.7% of those age 65 or over.

== Education ==
Union Community School District serves the municipality. The district was established on July 1, 1993 by the merger of the Dysart-Geneseo Community School District and La Porte City Community School District; the former was established on July 1, 1966 by the merger of the Dysart and Geneseo school districts.

Dysart has one kindergarten through fifth grade elementary: Dysart-Geneseo Elementary School. Dysart-Geneseo's high school consolidated with La Porte City's in 1989. UCS has learning centers located in Dysart and La Porte City, Iowa. The district office as well as Union High School and one elementary school are located in La Porte City and the middle, Union Middle School, and another elementary school are located in Dysart.
