= Atkins, Iowa =

- City
- Location of Atkins, Iowa
- Coordinates: 41°59′41″N 91°51′40″W
- Country: United States
- State: Iowa
- County: Benton

Area
  - Total: 1.10 sq mi (2.84 km^{2})
  - Land: 1.10 sq mi (2.84 km^{2})
  - Water: 0 sq mi (0.00 km^{2})
- Elevation: 850 ft (260 m)

Population (2020)
  - Total: 2,056
  - Density: 1,874/sq mi (723.6/km^{2})
- Time zone: UTC-6 (Central (CST))
  - Summer (DST): UTC-5 (CDT)
- ZIP code: 52206
- Area code: 319
- FIPS code: 19-03475
- GNIS feature ID: 0454274
- Website: cityofatkins.org

Atkins is a city in Benton County, Iowa, United States. The population was 2,056 at the 2020 census. It is part of the Cedar Rapids Metropolitan Statistical Area.

== History ==
Atkins was founded in 1881, following construction of the Chicago, Milwaukee and St. Paul Railroad through the territory. It was named for a railroad official.

== Geography ==
Atkins is located approximately 10 miles (16 km) west of downtown Cedar Rapids.

According to the United States Census Bureau, the city has a total area of 1.09 square miles (2.82 km^{2}), all land.

== Demographics ==
Historical populations
Year	Pop.	±%
1920	202	—
1930	314	+55.4%
1940	330	+5.1%
1950	387	+17.3%
1960	527	+36.2%
1970	581	+10.2%
1980	678	+16.7%
1990	637	−6.0%
2000	977	+53.4%
2010	1,670	+70.9%
2020	2,056	+23.1%
Source:"U.S. Census website". United States Census Bureau. and Iowa Data Center; Source: U.S. Decennial Census

=== 2020 census ===
As of the 2020 census, Atkins had a population of 2,056. There were 719 households and 573 families residing in the city. The population density was 1,874.1 inhabitants per square mile (723.6/km^{2}). There were 747 housing units at an average density of 680.9 per square mile (262.9/km^{2}), of which 3.7% were vacant. The homeowner vacancy rate was 1.0% and the rental vacancy rate was 9.7%.

0.0% of residents lived in urban areas, while 100.0% lived in rural areas.

Of the 719 households, 43.7% had children under the age of 18 living with them. Of all households, 70.0% were married-couple households, 5.3% were cohabiting-couple households, 10.8% were households with a male householder and no spouse or partner present, and 13.9% were households with a female householder and no spouse or partner present. About 20.3% of households were non-families, 16.4% of all households were made up of individuals, and 6.5% had someone living alone who was 65 years of age or older.

The median age was 36.7 years. 31.2% of residents were under the age of 18 and 11.5% of residents were 65 years of age or older. 33.5% of residents were under the age of 20; 4.0% were between the ages of 20 and 24; 25.6% were from 25 to 44; and 25.4% were from 45 to 64. The gender makeup of the city was 50.2% male and 49.8% female. For every 100 females there were 101.0 males, and for every 100 females age 18 and over there were 99.4 males age 18 and over.

Racial composition as of the 2020 census
Race	Number	Percent
White	1,969	95.8%
Black or African American	8	0.4%
American Indian and Alaska Native	1	0.0%
Asian	2	0.1%
Native Hawaiian and Other Pacific Islander	0	0.0%
Some other race	1	0.0%
Two or more races	75	3.6%
Hispanic or Latino (of any race)	15	0.7%

=== 2010 census ===
As of the census of 2010, there were 1,670 people, 592 households, and 480 families living in the city. The population density was 1,532.1 inhabitants per square mile (591.5/km^{2}). There were 610 housing units at an average density of 559.6 per square mile (216.1/km^{2}). The racial makeup of the city was 98.9% White, 0.1% African American, 0.3% Native American, 0.1% Asian, and 0.7% from two or more races. Hispanic or Latino of any race were 0.7% of the population.

There were 592 households, of which 45.6% had children under the age of 18 living with them, 72.8% were married couples living together, 4.1% had a female householder with no husband present, 4.2% had a male householder with no wife present, and 18.9% were non-families. 14.7% of all households were made up of individuals, and 6% had someone living alone who was 65 years of age or older. The average household size was 2.82 and the average family size was 3.14.

The median age in the city was 35.7 years. 31.3% of residents were under the age of 18; 5% were between the ages of 18 and 24; 30.5% were from 25 to 44; 23.1% were from 45 to 64; and 9.9% were 65 years of age or older. The gender makeup of the city was 51.0% male and 49.0% female.

=== 2000 census ===
As of the census of 2000, there were 977 people, 361 households, and 275 families living in the city. The population density was 1,197.6 inhabitants per square mile (462.4/km^{2}). There were 369 housing units at an average density of 452.3 per square mile (174.6/km^{2}). The racial makeup of the city was 99.69% White, 0.10% Native American, and 0.20% from two or more races. Hispanic or Latino of any race were 0.82% of the population.

There were 361 households, out of which 42.4% had children under the age of 18 living with them, 68.1% were married couples living together, 5.3% had a female householder with no husband present, and 23.8% were non-families. 20.8% of all households were made up of individuals, and 8.3% had someone living alone who was 65 years of age or older. The average household size was 2.71 and the average family size was 3.13.

31.3% were under the age of 18, 5.7% from 18 to 24, 34.2% from 25 to 44, 17.7% from 45 to 64, and 11.1% were 65 years of age or older. The median age was 33 years. For every 100 females, there were 102.7 males. For every 100 females age 18 and over, there were 101.5 males.

The median income for a household in the city was $50,833, and the median income for a family was $58,375. Males had a median income of $40,950 versus $26,719 for females. The per capita income for the city was $20,507. About 1.7% of families and 3.9% of the population were below the poverty line, including 6.0% of those under age 18 and 3.4% of those age 65 or over.

== Education ==
Benton Community School District operates local public schools.
