= Newhall, Iowa =

- City
- Location of Newhall, Iowa
- Coordinates: 41°59′38″N 91°57′59″W
- Country: United States
- State: Iowa
- County: Benton

Area
  - Total: 0.30 sq mi (0.78 km^{2})
  - Land: 0.30 sq mi (0.78 km^{2})
  - Water: 0 sq mi (0.00 km^{2})
- Elevation: 876 ft (267 m)

Population (2020)
  - Total: 876
  - Density: 2,904/sq mi (1,121.4/km^{2})
- Time zone: UTC-6 (Central (CST))
  - Summer (DST): UTC-5 (CDT)
- ZIP code: 52315
- Area code: 319
- FIPS code: 19-56055
- GNIS feature ID: 0459508
- Website: www.cityofnewhall.com

Newhall is a city in Benton County, Iowa, United States. The population was 876 at the time of the 2020 census. It is part of the Cedar Rapids Metropolitan Statistical Area.

== History ==
Newhall was founded in 1881, following construction of the Chicago, Milwaukee and St. Paul Railroad through the territory.

== Geography ==
According to the United States Census Bureau, the city has a total area of 0.32 square miles (0.83 km^{2}), all land.

== Demographics ==
Historical populations
Year	Pop.	±%
1920	293	—
1930	336	+14.7%
1940	330	−1.8%
1950	366	+10.9%
1960	495	+35.2%
1970	701	+41.6%
1980	899	+28.2%
1990	854	−5.0%
2000	886	+3.7%
2010	875	−1.2%
2020	876	+0.1%
Source:"U.S. Census website". United States Census Bureau. and Iowa Data Center; Source: U.S. Decennial Census

=== 2020 census ===
As of the census of 2020, there were 876 people, 392 households, and 239 families residing in the city. The population density was 2,904.4 inhabitants per square mile (1,121.4/km^{2}). There were 396 housing units at an average density of 1,313.0 per square mile (506.9/km^{2}). The racial makeup of the city was 95.9% White, 0.0% Black or African American, 0.1% Native American, 0.2% Asian, 0.1% Pacific Islander, 0.2% from other races and 3.4% from two or more races. Hispanic or Latino persons of any race comprised 1.5% of the population.

Of the 392 households, 33.7% of which had children under the age of 18 living with them, 46.7% were married couples living together, 9.4% were cohabitating couples, 26.3% had a female householder with no spouse or partner present and 17.6% had a male householder with no spouse or partner present. 39.0% of all households were non-families. 30.9% of all households were made up of individuals, 17.3% had someone living alone who was 65 years old or older.

The median age in the city was 38.8 years. 27.5% of the residents were under the age of 20; 3.5% were between the ages of 20 and 24; 25.9% were from 25 and 44; 23.4% were from 45 and 64; and 19.6% were 65 years of age or older. The gender makeup of the city was 48.4% male and 51.6% female.

=== 2010 census ===
As of the census of 2010, there were 875 people, 353 households, and 254 families living in the city. The population density was 2,734.4 inhabitants per square mile (1,055.8/km^{2}). There were 376 housing units at an average density of 1,175.0 per square mile (453.7/km^{2}). The racial makeup of the city was 98.3% White, 1.0% African American, 0.1% Native American, 0.3% Asian, and 0.2% from two or more races. Hispanic or Latino of any race were 1.0% of the population.

There were 353 households, of which 33.7% had children under the age of 18 living with them, 60.6% were married couples living together, 7.9% had a female householder with no husband present, 3.4% had a male householder with no wife present, and 28.0% were non-families. 25.5% of all households were made up of individuals, and 13.6% had someone living alone who was 65 years of age or older. The average household size was 2.48 and the average family size was 2.98.

The median age in the city was 39.7 years. 25.6% of residents were under the age of 18; 5.8% were between the ages of 18 and 24; 25.6% were from 25 to 44; 25.5% were from 45 to 64; and 17.5% were 65 years of age or older. The gender makeup of the city was 48.0% male and 52.0% female.

=== 2000 census ===
As of the census of 2000, there were 886 people, 360 households, and 245 families living in the city. The population density was 2,966.2 inhabitants per square mile (1,145.3/km^{2}). There were 368 housing units at an average density of 1,232.0 per square mile (475.7/km^{2}). The racial makeup of the city was 100.00% White. Hispanic or Latino of any race were 0.68% of the population.

There were 360 households, out of which 33.9% had children under the age of 18 living with them, 61.1% were married couples living together, 4.4% had a female householder with no husband present, and 31.9% were non-families. 27.5% of all households were made up of individuals, and 17.5% had someone living alone who was 65 years of age or older. The average household size was 2.46 and the average family size was 3.02.

In the city, the population was spread out, with 27.2% under the age of 18, 6.9% from 18 to 24, 26.2% from 25 to 44, 18.7% from 45 to 64, and 21.0% who were 65 years of age or older. The median age was 39 years. For every 100 females, there were 88.9 males. For every 100 females age 18 and over, there were 88.0 males.

The median income for a household in the city was $43,269, and the median income for a family was $51,250. Males had a median income of $35,250 versus $29,167 for females. The per capita income for the city was $20,124. About 0.8% of families and 2.3% of the population were below the poverty line, including none of those under age 18 and 2.1% of those age 65 over.

== Education ==
Benton Community School District operates local public schools.

Central Lutheran School is also located in Newhall.
