= Belle Plaine Community School District =

School district in Belle Plaine, Iowa, United States

Coordinates: 41.890925°N 92.276652°W

Location
- Belle Plaine, Iowa Benton, Tama, Iowa and Powesheik counties United States
- Coordinates: 41.890925, -92.276652

District information
- Type: Local school district
- Grades: K-12
- Superintendent: Chad Straight
- Schools: 2
- Budget: $8,665,000 (2020-21)
- NCES District ID: 1904620

Students and staff
- Students: 479 (2022-23)
- Teachers: 39.34 FTE
- Staff: 33.63 FTE
- Student–teacher ratio: 12.18
- Athletic conference: South Iowa Cedar League
- District mascot: Plainsman
- Colors: Gold and blue

Other information
- Website: www.belle-plaine.k12.ia.us

The Belle Plaine Community School District is a rural, public school district in Belle Plaine, Iowa, United States. The district covers southwest Benton County, eastern Tama County, and smaller portions of Iowa and Powesheik counties. It serves the towns of Belle Plaine and Luzerne.

The school's mascot is the Plainsman. Their colors are gold and navy blue. They compete in the South Iowa Cedar League (SICL) conference.

== Schools ==
- Longfellow Elementary School
- Belle Plaine Jr./Sr. High School

The administrative offices are located at Longfellow Elementary School.

=== Belle Plaine Jr./Sr. High School ===
Belle Plaine Jr./Sr. High School is the local public high school in Belle Plaine.

==== Athletics ====
The Plainsmen compete in the South Iowa Cedar League Conference in the following sports:

- Cross country (boys' and girls')
- Volleyball (girls')
- Football (boys')
- Basketball (boys' and girls')
- Wrestling (boys' and girls')
  - Boys' State Champions - 1976, 2001
- Track and field (boys' and girls')
  - Boys' State Champions- 1969, 1971
  - Girls' State Champions - 1964, 1965, 1966, 1984, 1998
- Golf (boys' and girls')
  - Boys' State Champions - 2002
- Baseball (boys')
- Softball (girls')
