= Benton County, Iowa =

County in Iowa, United States

- County
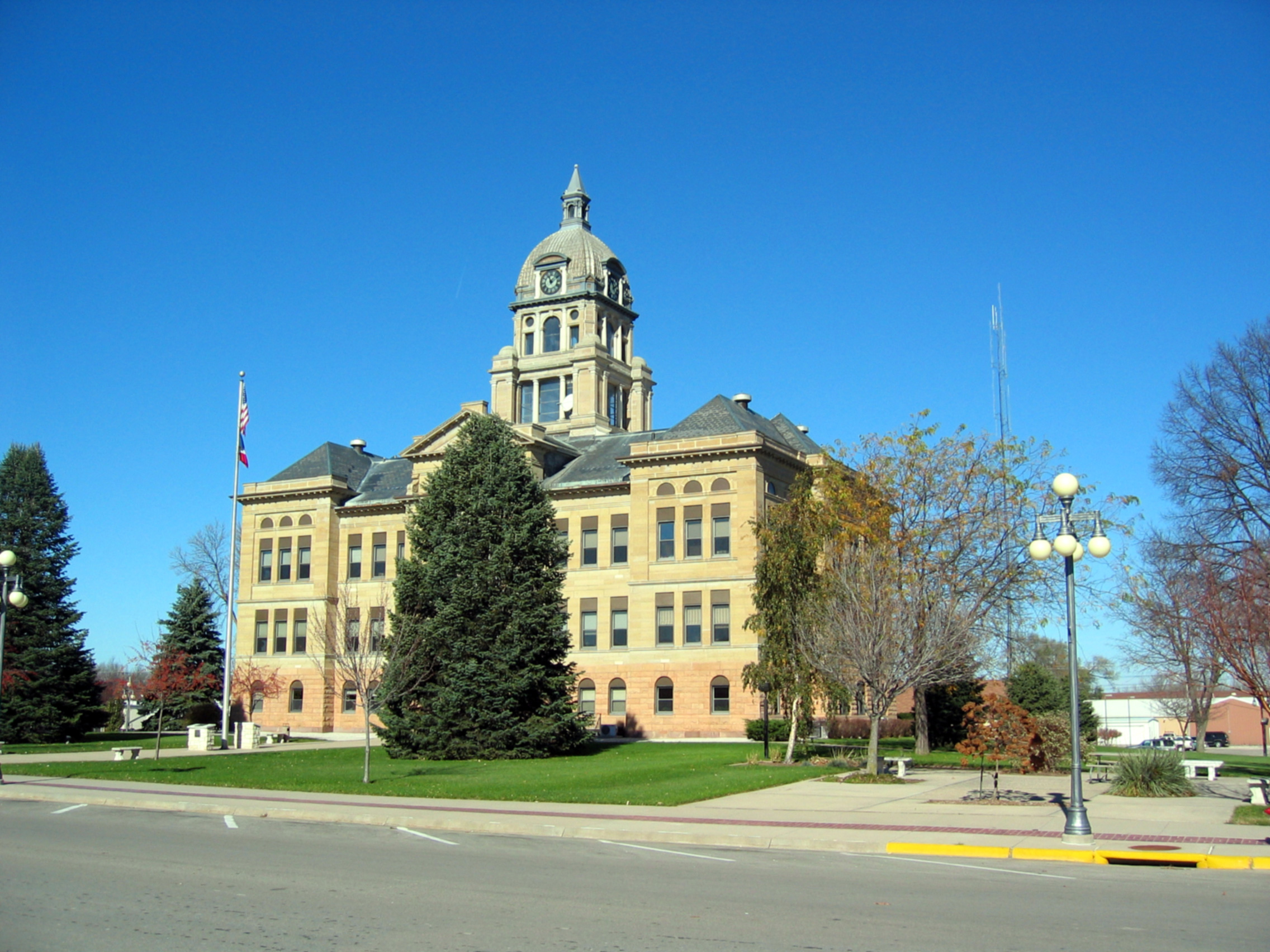
- Benton County Courthouse

- Location within the U.S. state of Iowa
- Coordinates: 42°04′47″N 92°04′03″W
- Country: United States
- State: Iowa
- Founded: 1837
- Named for: Thomas Hart Benton
- Seat: Vinton
- Largest city: Vinton

Area
  - Total: 718 sq mi (1,860 km^{2})
  - Land: 716 sq mi (1,850 km^{2})
  - Water: 2.2 sq mi (5.7 km^{2}) 0.3%

Population (2020)
  - Total: 25,575
  - Estimate (2025): 26,004 ▲
  - Density: 35.7/sq mi (13.8/km^{2})
- Time zone: UTC−6 (Central)
  - Summer (DST): UTC−5 (CDT)
- Congressional district: 1st
- Website: www.bentoncountyia.gov
- Iowa county number 06

Benton County is a county in the U.S. state of Iowa. As of the 2020 census, the population was 25,575. Its county seat and largest city is Vinton. The county is named for Thomas Hart Benton, a U.S. Senator from Missouri.

Benton County is part of the Cedar Rapids, IA Metropolitan Statistical Area.

== History ==
Benton County was formed on December 21, 1837, from sections of Dubuque County. It was named after US Senator Thomas Hart Benton.

== Geography ==
According to the U.S. Census Bureau, the county has a total area of 718 square miles (1,860 km^{2}), of which 716 square miles (1,850 km^{2}) is land and 2.2 square miles (5.7 km^{2}) (0.3%) is water.

=== Major highways ===
- Interstate 380
- U.S. Highway 30
- U.S. Highway 151
- U.S. Highway 218
- Iowa Highway 8
- Iowa Highway 21
- Iowa Highway 27
- Iowa Highway 150

=== Adjacent counties ===
- Black Hawk County (northwest)
- Buchanan County (northeast)
- Linn County (east)
- Iowa County (south)
- Tama County (west)
- Poweshiek County (southwest)
- Johnson County (southeast)

== Demographics ==
Historical population
Census	Pop.	Note	%±
1850	672		—
1860	8,496		1,164.3%
1870	22,454		164.3%
1880	24,888		10.8%
1890	24,178		−2.9%
1900	25,177		4.1%
1910	23,156		−8.0%
1920	24,080		4.0%
1930	22,851		−5.1%
1940	22,879		0.1%
1950	22,656		−1.0%
1960	23,422		3.4%
1970	22,885		−2.3%
1980	23,649		3.3%
1990	22,429		−5.2%
2000	25,308		12.8%
2010	26,076		3.0%
2020	25,575		−1.9%
2025 (est.)	26,004	▲	1.7%
U.S. Decennial Census; 1790-1960 1900-1990; 1990-2000 2010-2018

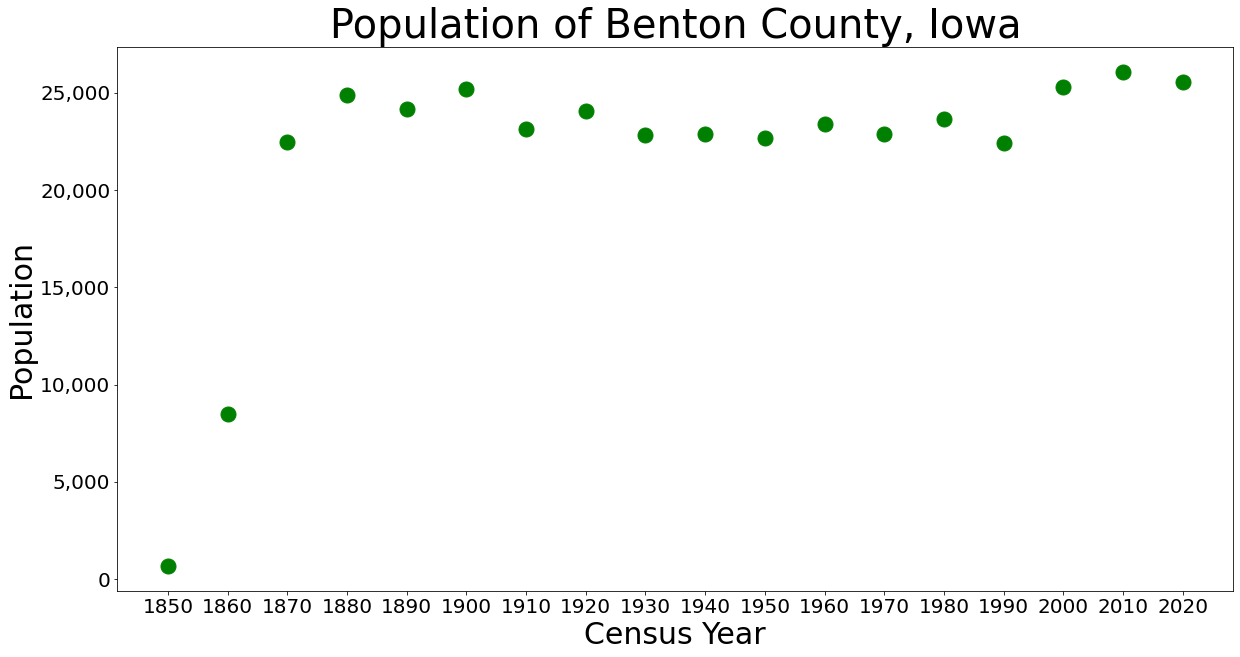
Population of Benton County from US census data

=== 2020 census ===
As of the 2020 census, the county had a population of 25,575 and a population density of 35.6/sq mi (13.8/km^{2}). 96.29% of residents reported being of one race.

The median age was 42.3 years. 23.9% of residents were under the age of 18 and 18.3% of residents were 65 years of age or older. For every 100 females there were 101.5 males, and for every 100 females age 18 and over there were 100.2 males age 18 and over.

The racial makeup of the county was 94.9% White, 0.4% Black or African American, 0.1% American Indian and Alaska Native, 0.3% Asian, <0.1% Native Hawaiian and Pacific Islander, 0.5% from some other race, and 3.7% from two or more races; Hispanic or Latino residents of any race comprised 1.8% of the population. Of those reporting a single race, 93.04% were non-Hispanic White, 0.45% were Black, 0.13% were Native American, 0.32% were Asian, 0.01% were Native Hawaiian or Pacific Islander, and 4.24% were some other race or more than one race.

18.7% of residents lived in urban areas, while 81.3% lived in rural areas.

There were 10,282 households in the county, of which 30.4% had children under the age of 18 living in them. Of all households, 55.8% were married-couple households, 17.5% were households with a male householder and no spouse or partner present, and 19.6% were households with a female householder and no spouse or partner present. About 25.5% of all households were made up of individuals and 12.1% had someone living alone who was 65 years of age or older. There were 11,076 housing units, of which 7.2% were vacant and 10,282 were occupied. Among occupied housing units, 82.5% were owner-occupied and 17.5% were renter-occupied. The homeowner vacancy rate was 1.5% and the rental vacancy rate was 9.5%.

=== 2010 census ===
The 2010 census recorded a population of 26,076 in the county, with a population density of 36.4/sq mi (14.1/km^{2}). There were 11,095 housing units, of which 10,302 were occupied.

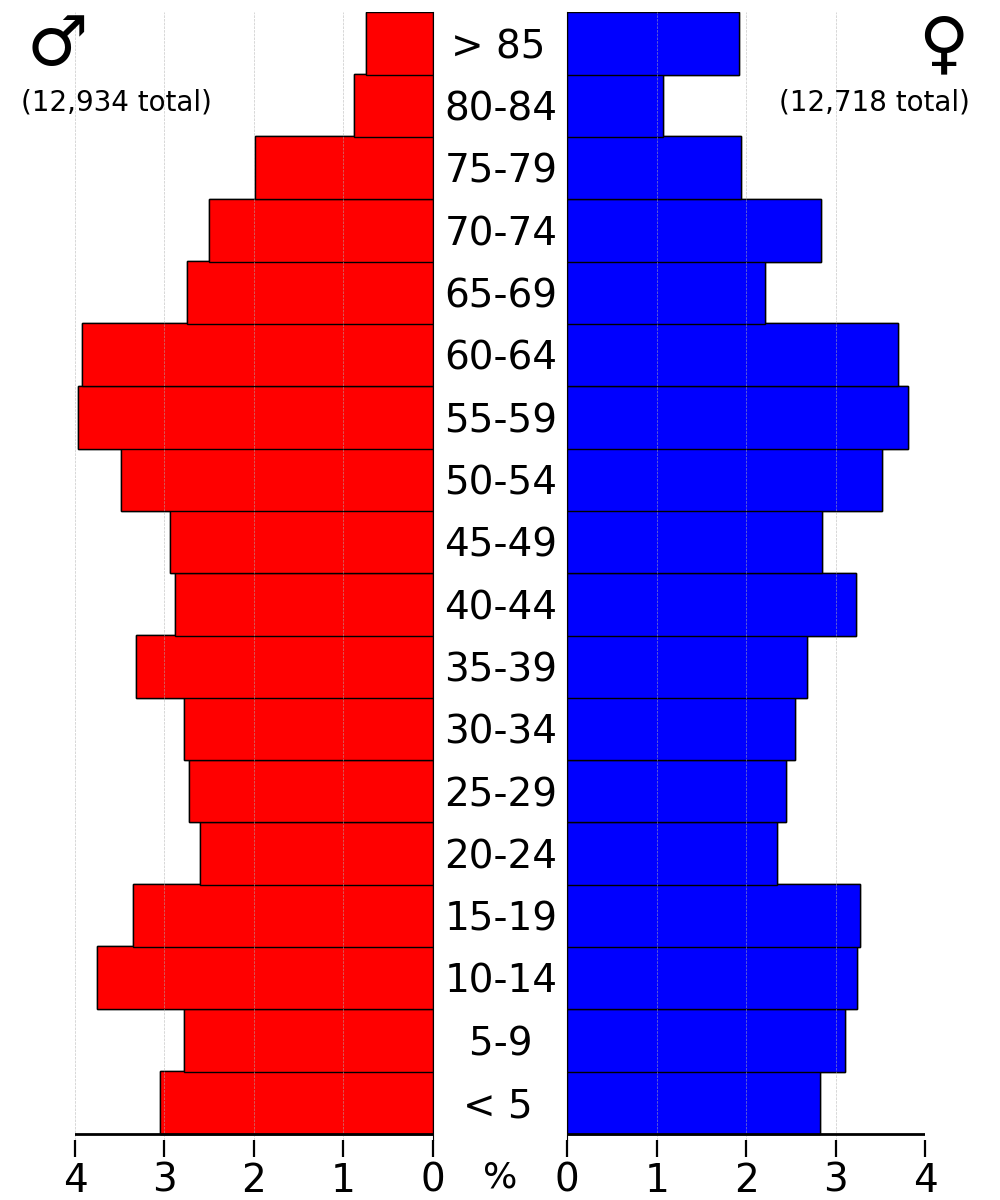
2022 US Census population pyramid for Benton County from ACS 5-year estimates

=== 2000 census ===
As of the census of 2000, there were 25,308 people, 9,746 households, and 7,056 families residing in the county. The population density was 35 inhabitants per square mile (14/km^{2}). There were 10,377 housing units at an average density of 14 per square mile (5.4/km^{2}). The racial makeup of the county was 98.84% White, 0.20% Black or African American, 0.15% Native American, 0.17% Asian, 0.02% Pacific Islander, 0.11% from other races, and 0.52% from two or more races. 0.62% of the population were Hispanic or Latino of any race.

There were 9,746 households, out of which 34.90% had children under the age of 18 living with them, 62.70% were married couples living together, 6.5% had a female householder with no husband present, and 27.6% were non-families. 23.4% of all households were made up of individuals, and 11.70% had someone living alone who was 65 years of age or older. The average household size was 2.56 and the average family size was 3.04.

In the county, the population was spread out, with 27.4% under the age of 18, 6.8% from 18 to 24, 29.3% from 25 to 44, 21.1% from 45 to 64, and 15.4% who were 65 years of age or older. The median age was 37 years. For every 100 females, there were 100.0 males. For every 100 females age 18 and over, there were 95.8 males.

The median income for a household in the county was $42,427, and the median income for a family was $49,701. Males had a median income of $35,044 versus $23,978 for females. The per capita income for the county was $18,891. About 4.6% of families and 6.1% of the population were below the poverty line, including 7.2% of those under age 18 and 7.0% of those age 65 or over.

== Communities ==
=== Cities ===
- Atkins
- Belle Plaine
- Blairstown
- Garrison
- Keystone
- Luzerne
- Mount Auburn
- Newhall
- Norway
- Shellsburg
- Urbana
- Van Horne
- Vinton
- Walford

=== Townships ===
Benton County is divided into twenty townships:

- Benton
- Big Grove
- Bruce
- Canton
- Cedar
- Eden
- Eldorado
- Florence
- Fremont
- Harrison
- Homer
- Iowa
- Jackson
- Kane
- Leroy
- Monroe
- Polk
- St. Clair
- Taylor
- Union

=== Census-designated place ===
- Watkins

=== Population ranking ===
The population ranking of the following table is based on the 2020 census of Benton County.

† county seat

Rank	City/Town/etc.	Municipal type	Population (2020 Census)	Population (2024 Estimate)
1	† Vinton	City	4,938	5,065
2	Belle Plaine	City	2,330	2,336
3	Atkins	City	2,056	2,297
4	Urbana	City	1,554	1,788
5	Walford (partially in Linn County)	City	1,366	1,378
6	Shellsburg	City	961	996
7	Newhall	City	876	892
8	Van Horne	City	774	791
9	Blairstown	City	713	722
10	Keystone	City	599	630
11	Norway	City	466	480
12	Garrison	City	344	338
13	Mount Auburn	City	162	167
14	Watkins	CDP	116	119
15	Luzerne	City	112	117

== Politics ==
United States presidential election results for Benton County, Iowa
Year	Republican		Democratic		Third party(ies)	
Year	No.	%	No.	%	No.	%
1896	3,604	57.50%	2,560	40.84%	104	1.66%
1900	3,609	56.89%	2,575	40.59%	160	2.52%
1904	3,609	61.10%	2,057	34.82%	241	4.08%
1908	3,180	55.08%	2,418	41.88%	175	3.03%
1912	1,831	31.53%	2,472	42.56%	1,505	25.91%
1916	3,189	54.16%	2,556	43.41%	143	2.43%
1920	6,539	71.02%	2,343	25.45%	325	3.53%
1924	5,314	58.13%	1,459	15.96%	2,369	25.91%
1928	5,669	62.68%	3,307	36.56%	69	0.76%
1932	3,424	34.87%	6,070	61.82%	325	3.31%
1936	4,144	41.72%	5,606	56.43%	184	1.85%
1940	5,298	49.55%	5,363	50.15%	32	0.30%
1944	4,378	48.43%	4,619	51.10%	42	0.46%
1948	3,770	45.06%	4,209	50.30%	388	4.64%
1952	6,316	59.09%	3,831	35.84%	542	5.07%
1956	5,634	56.31%	3,946	39.44%	426	4.26%
1960	5,972	56.33%	4,620	43.58%	9	0.08%
1964	3,453	34.24%	6,614	65.59%	17	0.17%
1968	5,016	52.06%	3,944	40.93%	675	7.01%
1972	5,273	54.09%	4,282	43.92%	194	1.99%
1976	5,014	46.85%	5,514	51.52%	175	1.64%
1980	5,329	50.11%	4,223	39.71%	1,083	10.18%
1984	5,566	52.13%	4,993	46.76%	119	1.11%
1988	4,011	40.20%	5,873	58.87%	93	0.93%
1992	3,469	33.23%	4,467	42.79%	2,503	23.98%
1996	3,835	37.31%	5,546	53.95%	898	8.74%
2000	5,468	46.47%	5,915	50.27%	383	3.26%
2004	6,658	49.31%	6,747	49.97%	96	0.71%
2008	6,447	47.00%	7,058	51.45%	212	1.55%
2012	6,940	49.49%	6,862	48.93%	221	1.58%
2016	8,232	59.46%	4,678	33.79%	934	6.75%
2020	9,188	62.75%	5,160	35.24%	294	2.01%
2024	9,549	65.81%	4,739	32.66%	221	1.52%

== Education ==
School districts:

- Belle Plaine Community School District
- Benton Community School District
- Center Point-Urbana Community School District
- College Community School District
- Independence Community School District
- North Linn Community School District
- Vinton-Shellsburg Community School District
- Union Community School District

There was formerly a state-operated school, Iowa Braille and Sight Saving School.

== See also ==
- Benton County Courthouse (Iowa)
- National Register of Historic Places listings in Benton County, Iowa
- Civil Bend
