= Honey Creek Township, Iowa County, Iowa =

Township in Iowa County, Iowa, U.S.

Coordinates: 41.8306°N 92.2503°W

Honey Creek Township is a township in Iowa County, Iowa, United States. It is named after the Honey Creek, a tributary of the Iowa River, which flows through it in a northwesterly direction.

== History ==
Honey Creek Township was established on 18 February 1856 out of a part of old Marengo Township. The first township meeting was held in the pioneer town of Koszta, which with the Koszta Cemetery are located in Section 14 of the township.

Early pioneer settlements were along watercourses because of the groves of trees which provided timber for farmers. One of the first settlements in the county was Hoosier Grove, later called The Hench Settlement, near where surveyors later platted Koszta.

Samuel Huston, who was a winning plaintiff in the first civil lawsuit held in Iowa County in May 1847, founded the pioneer town of Koszta in Honey Creek Township in 1856. Martin Koszta was formerly a citizen of the Austro-Hungarian Empire whom fled Hungary for Turkey, began the process of citizenship in the American consulate at Constantinople, then began his immigration to the United States. After spending over a year in the United States, he returned to Constantinople on business. He departed for the United States on an American vessel, but was waylaid while on shore at the port of Smyrna. While held in chains on board an Austrian naval vessel awaiting a packet ship that would send him back to Trieste and likely death, the United States intervened on his behalf. The incident, known as the Koszta Affair, set a precedent for protections afforded US residents not yet fully naturalized.

The Koszta Post Office was established in 1857. Samuel Huston was responsible for building the first bridge in the township. It provided access to the town which he platted.

The Koszta Cemetery was founded and initially laid out by Mart Coates. The first sawmill in Honey Creek township was built at Koszta in 1855. The first township school was built five years later, also in Koszta. A general store and hotel also once occupied the small town. The first congregation, of Methodist Episcopal denomination, was organized in 1845 and in 1860 they built their own church.
