= Geneseo Township, Tama County, Iowa =

Township in Tama County, Iowa, U.S.

Coordinates: 42.254608°N 92.34252°W

Location of Geneseo Township in Tama County

Geneseo Township is one of the twenty-one townships of Tama County, Iowa, United States.

== History ==
Geneseo Township was organized in 1856. Its name was chosen by a citizen who hailed from Geneseo, New York.
