= Vinton, Iowa =

- City
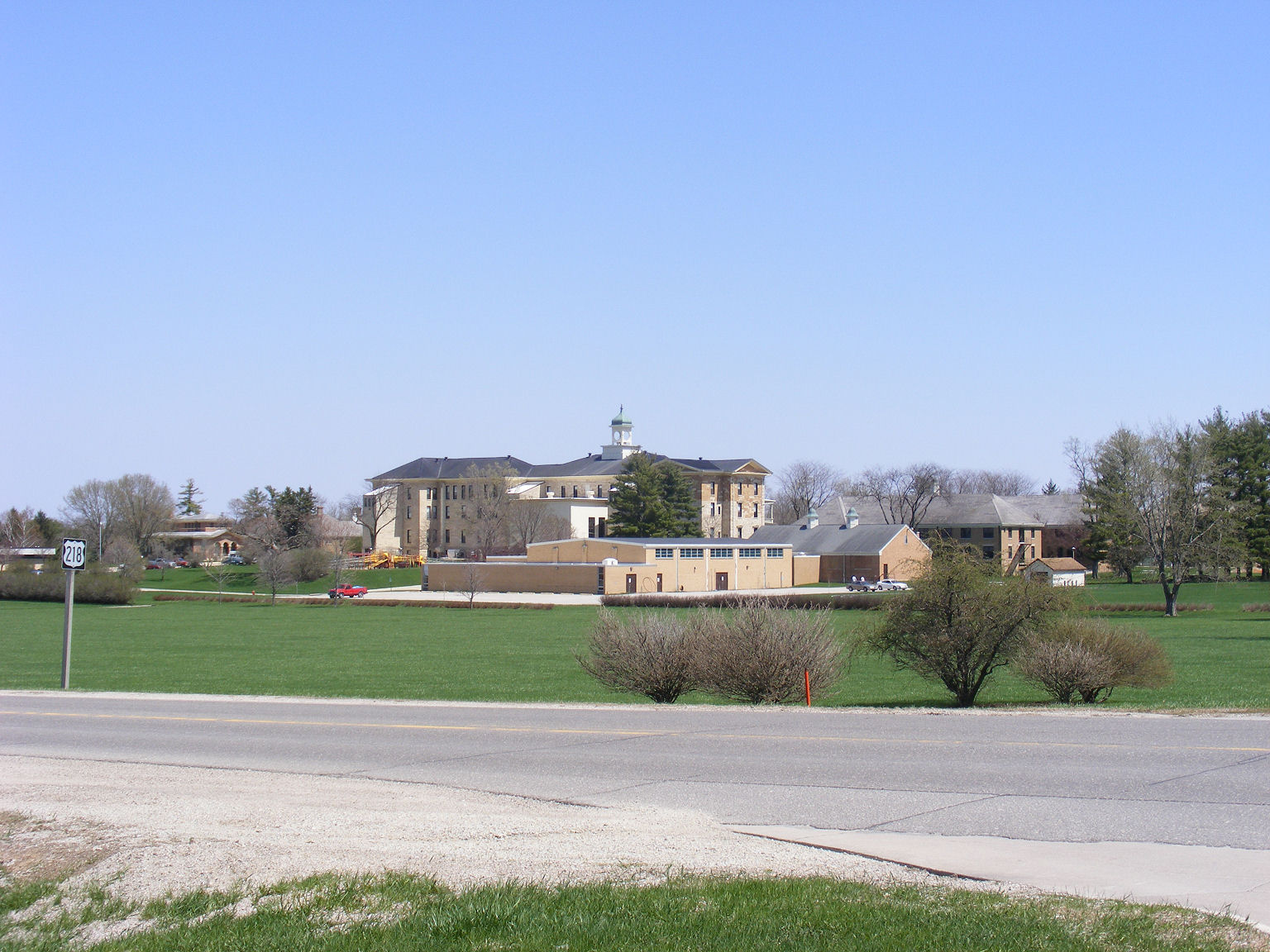
- Iowa Braille and Sight Saving School

- Location of Vinton, Iowa
- Coordinates: 42°9′51″N 92°1′34″W
- Country: United States
- State: Iowa
- County: Benton

Area
  - Total: 4.97 sq mi (12.88 km^{2})
  - Land: 4.88 sq mi (12.65 km^{2})
  - Water: 0.085 sq mi (0.22 km^{2})
- Elevation: 790 ft (240 m)

Population (2020)
  - Total: 4,938
  - Density: 1,010.9/sq mi (390.32/km^{2})
- Time zone: UTC-6 (Central (CST))
  - Summer (DST): UTC-5 (CDT)
- ZIP code: 52349
- Area code: 319
- FIPS code: 19-81210
- GNIS feature ID: 0462580
- Website: www.cityofvinton.org

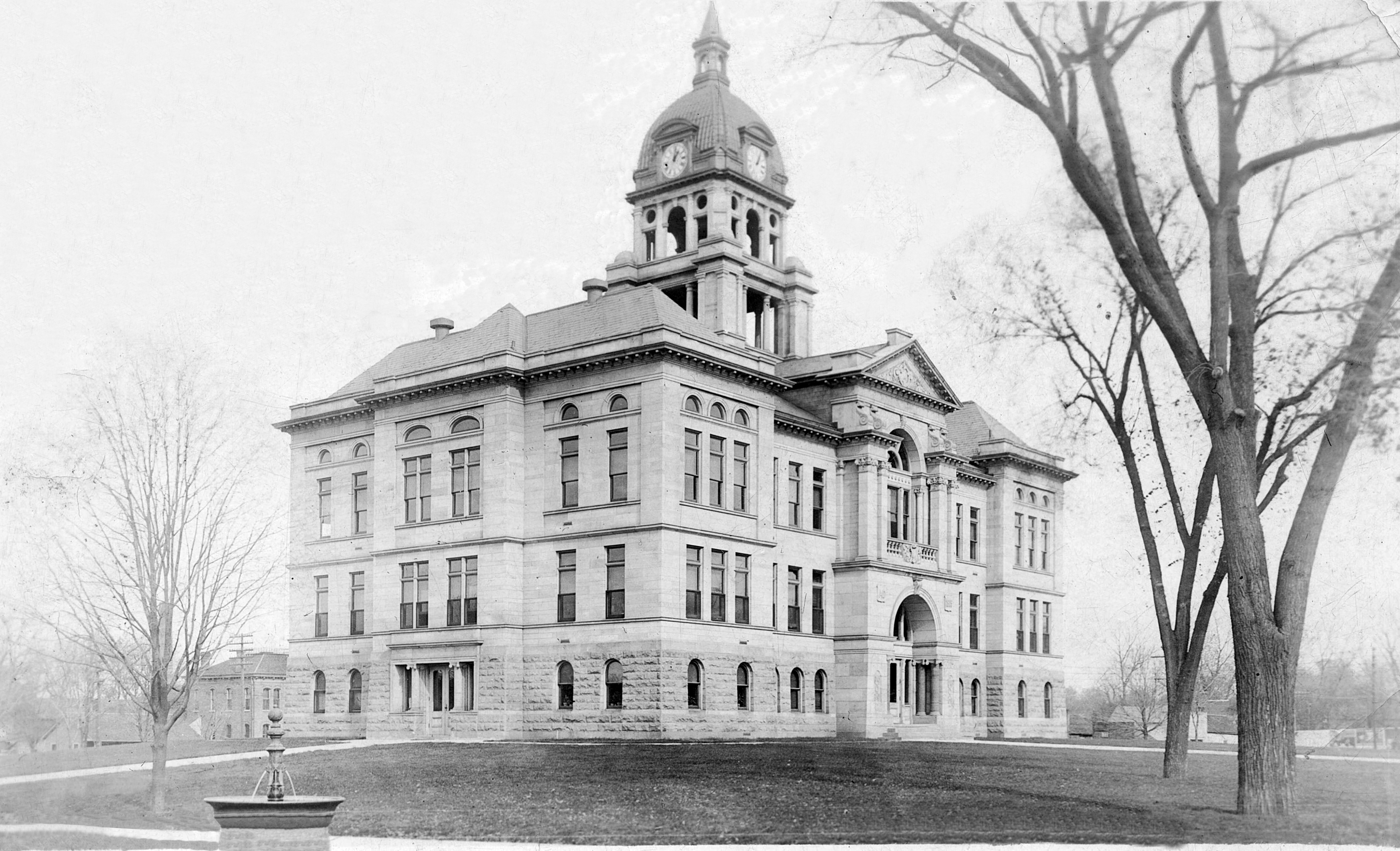
Courthouse in Vinton, 1911

Vinton is a city in Benton County, Iowa, United States. The population was 4,938 in the 2020 census, a decrease from 5,102 in 2000. It is also part of the Cedar Rapids metropolitan area. Vinton is the county seat of Benton County.

== History ==
Vinton was founded in 1849. It was named afterPlynn Vinton, a state legislator. The first railroad line was extended to Vinton in 1869, and it was incorporated as a city that same year.

=== Public Library controversy ===
In 2022, the library in Vinton closed after employees quit following complaints and allegations by patrons that included: the head librarian's "hiring and support for LGBTQ+ staff"; books by Jill Biden and Kamala Harris; "LGBTQ-themed book displays in the children’s section"; and male staff members "wearing dresses". One of the library's former directors said they had 173 books about Christian life, and only seven books about "LGBT, gay or transgender" topics; another former director said some patrons "would check out the books and not return them", rather than file written complaints about the books.

The library reopened later that same year and remains accredited through the State Library of Iowa. The library's website, including a searchable card catalog, can be found by visiting www.vinton.lib.ia.us.

== Geography ==
According to the United States Census Bureau, the city has a total area of 4.83 square miles (12.51 km^{2}), of which 4.74 square miles (12.28 km^{2}) is land and 0.09 square miles (0.23 km^{2}) is water.

Vinton is located on U.S. Route 218 and the Cedar River, which has flooded parts of the city, most recently in 2008. The town's extensive tree cover was damaged by a derecho (straight line windstorm) on July 11, 2011.

=== Climate ===
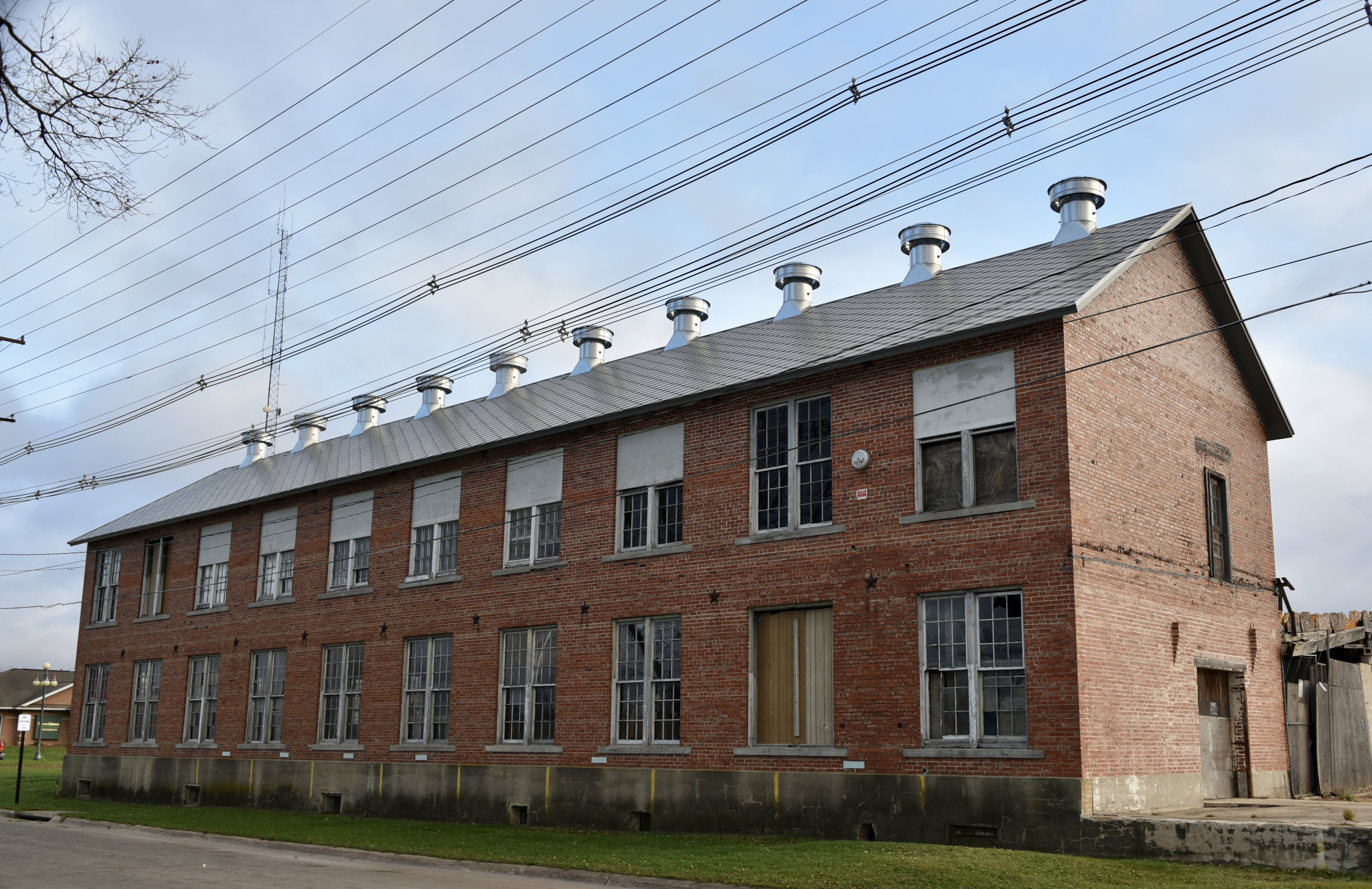
This is the iowa seeding and canning company

This region experiences significant seasonal temperature fluctuations, going from warm summers to very cold winters. There is precipitation year-round, and snowfall occurs in almost all years. Most summer rainfall occurs during thunderstorms and a very occasional tropical system. This area is classified as humid because it is not dry enough to be classified as semi-arid or arid.

Climate data for Vinton, Iowa, 1991–2020 normals, extremes 1904–present
Month	Jan	Feb	Mar	Apr	May	Jun	Jul	Aug	Sep	Oct	Nov	Dec	Year
Record high °F (°C)	63 (17)	72 (22)	88 (31)	91 (33)	95 (35)	101 (38)	105 (41)	104 (40)	100 (38)	94 (34)	80 (27)	73 (23)	105 (41)
Mean maximum °F (°C)	47.5 (8.6)	53.4 (11.9)	69.8 (21.0)	81.1 (27.3)	87.0 (30.6)	91.3 (32.9)	92.5 (33.6)	90.8 (32.7)	88.9 (31.6)	82.4 (28.0)	67.2 (19.6)	52.4 (11.3)	94.0 (34.4)
Mean daily maximum °F (°C)	25.6 (−3.6)	30.4 (−0.9)	44.4 (6.9)	58.7 (14.8)	69.4 (20.8)	78.3 (25.7)	81.4 (27.4)	79.3 (26.3)	73.5 (23.1)	60.2 (15.7)	44.2 (6.8)	31.0 (−0.6)	56.4 (13.5)
Daily mean °F (°C)	16.9 (−8.4)	21.3 (−5.9)	34.1 (1.2)	46.8 (8.2)	58.0 (14.4)	67.5 (19.7)	70.8 (21.6)	68.5 (20.3)	61.5 (16.4)	48.8 (9.3)	34.7 (1.5)	22.7 (−5.2)	46.0 (7.8)
Mean daily minimum °F (°C)	8.1 (−13.3)	12.3 (−10.9)	23.8 (−4.6)	34.9 (1.6)	46.6 (8.1)	56.6 (13.7)	60.2 (15.7)	57.7 (14.3)	49.5 (9.7)	37.3 (2.9)	25.2 (−3.8)	14.5 (−9.7)	35.6 (2.0)
Mean minimum °F (°C)	−13.4 (−25.2)	−8.3 (−22.4)	3.9 (−15.6)	21.8 (−5.7)	33.6 (0.9)	46.0 (7.8)	52.0 (11.1)	49.5 (9.7)	35.9 (2.2)	22.9 (−5.1)	9.7 (−12.4)	−5.5 (−20.8)	−17.7 (−27.6)
Record low °F (°C)	−35 (−37)	−32 (−36)	−34 (−37)	4 (−16)	22 (−6)	35 (2)	42 (6)	36 (2)	22 (−6)	10 (−12)	−10 (−23)	−27 (−33)	−35 (−37)
Average precipitation inches (mm)	1.19 (30)	1.25 (32)	2.05 (52)	3.90 (99)	5.01 (127)	5.62 (143)	4.15 (105)	4.22 (107)	3.68 (93)	3.22 (82)	2.05 (52)	1.59 (40)	37.93 (962)
Average snowfall inches (cm)	8.3 (21)	8.5 (22)	4.4 (11)	1.4 (3.6)	0.0 (0.0)	0.0 (0.0)	0.0 (0.0)	0.0 (0.0)	0.0 (0.0)	0.4 (1.0)	1.8 (4.6)	8.8 (22)	33.6 (85.2)
Average precipitation days (≥ 0.01 in)	7.2	6.4	7.6	9.5	12.3	11.8	9.4	9.4	8.6	8.3	6.2	7.5	104.2
Average snowy days (≥ 0.1 in)	5.1	4.4	2.2	0.7	0.0	0.0	0.0	0.0	0.0	0.2	1.0	4.4	18.0
Source 1: NOAA
Source 2: National Weather Service

== Demographics ==
Historical population
Year	Pop.	±%
1870	2,460	—
1880	2,906	+18.1%
1890	2,865	−1.4%
1900	3,499	+22.1%
1910	3,336	−4.7%
1920	3,381	+1.3%
1930	3,372	−0.3%
1940	4,163	+23.5%
1950	4,307	+3.5%
1960	4,781	+11.0%
1970	4,845	+1.3%
1980	5,040	+4.0%
1990	5,103	+1.2%
2000	5,102	−0.0%
2010	5,257	+3.0%
2020	4,938	−6.1%
Iowa Data Center; Source: U.S. Decennial Census

=== 2020 census ===
As of the 2020 census, there were 4,938 people, 2,117 households, and 1,278 families residing in the city. The population density was 1,010.9 inhabitants per square mile (390.3/km^{2}). There were 2,262 housing units at an average density of 463.1 per square mile (178.8/km^{2}).

96.7% of residents lived in urban areas, while 3.3% lived in rural areas.

Of the 2,117 households, 28.0% had children under the age of 18 living with them, 43.5% were married couples living together, 7.8% were cohabitating couples, 29.8% had a female householder with no spouse or partner present, and 18.9% had a male householder with no spouse or partner present. In total, 39.6% of households were non-families; 33.8% of all households were made up of individuals, and 16.6% had someone living alone who was 65 years old or older.

The median age in the city was 42.2 years. 22.9% of residents were under the age of 18, 25.4% were under the age of 20, 4.8% were between the ages of 20 and 24, 22.8% were from 25 to 44, 25.0% were from 45 to 64, and 21.9% were 65 years of age or older. The gender makeup of the city was 47.7% male and 52.3% female. For every 100 females there were 91.2 males, and for every 100 females age 18 and over there were 87.5 males age 18 and over.

Of the 2,262 housing units, 6.4% were vacant. The homeowner vacancy rate was 2.3% and the rental vacancy rate was 5.9%.

Racial composition as of the 2020 census
Race	Number	Percent
White	4,657	94.3%
Black or African American	34	0.7%
American Indian and Alaska Native	12	0.2%
Asian	17	0.3%
Native Hawaiian and Other Pacific Islander	0	0.0%
Some other race	37	0.7%
Two or more races	181	3.7%
Hispanic or Latino (of any race)	84	1.7%

=== 2010 census ===
As of the census of 2010, there were 5,257 people, 2,187 households, and 1,397 families residing in the city. The population density was 1,109.1 inhabitants per square mile (428.2/km^{2}). There were 2,299 housing units at an average density of 485.0 per square mile (187.3/km^{2}). The racial makeup of the city was 97.8% White, 0.3% African American, 0.2% Native American, 0.3% Asian, 0.2% from other races, and 1.2% from two or more races. Hispanic or Latino of any race were 1.0% of the population.

There were 2,187 households, of which 30.4% had children under the age of 18 living with them, 47.9% were married couples living together, 11.3% had a female householder with no husband present, 4.6% had a male householder with no wife present, and 36.1% were non-families. 31.0% of all households were made up of individuals, and 16.1% had someone living alone who was 65 years of age or older. The average household size was 2.33 and the average family size was 2.91.

The median age in the city was 40.3 years. 24.7% of residents were under the age of 18; 8.1% were between the ages of 18 and 24; 23.1% were from 25 to 44; 24.5% were from 45 to 64; and 19.5% were 65 years of age or older. The gender makeup of the city was 47.3% male and 52.7% female.

=== 2000 census ===
As of the census of 2000, there were 5,102 people, 2,116 households, and 1,390 families residing in the city. The population density was 1,187.7 inhabitants per square mile (458.6/km^{2}). There were 2,227 housing units at an average density of 518.4 per square mile (200.2/km^{2}). The racial makeup of the city was 98.26% White, 0.25% African American, 0.18% Native American, 0.27% Asian, 0.02% Pacific Islander, 0.22% from other races, and 0.80% from two or more races. Hispanic or Latino of any race were 0.94% of the population.

There were 2,116 households, out of which 30.8% had children under the age of 18 living with them, 53.8% were married couples living together, 9.7% had a female householder with no husband present, and 34.3% were non-families. 29.9% of all households were made up of individuals, and 15.0% had someone living alone who was 65 years of age or older. The average household size was 2.34 and the average family size was 2.91.

25.0% are under the age of 18, 7.9% from 18 to 24, 27.3% from 25 to 44, 19.5% from 45 to 64, and 20.2% who were 65 years of age or older. The median age was 38 years. For every 100 females, there were 90.1 males. For every 100 females age 18 and over, there were 84.6 males.

The median income for a household in the city was $35,114, and the median income for a family was $41,546. Males had a median income of $32,460 versus $19,988 for females. The per capita income for the city was $19,808. About 9.5% of families and 9.8% of the population were below the poverty line, including 13.7% of those under age 18 and 6.0% of those age 65 or over.

== Education ==
The Vinton-Shellsburg Community School District operates public schools. The district was established on July 1, 1993, by the merger of the Vinton Community School District and the Shellsburg Community School District.

Vinton was the home of the Iowa Braille and Sight Saving School, Iowa's state educational institution for vision-impaired students.

Residing in the Braille School since 2008 is the North Central Region headquarters for AmeriCorps National Civilian Community Corps (NCCC).

== Media ==
Portions of downtown Vinton, along with the Benton County courthouse, were featured in the 1996 John Travolta film Michael. Also seen during the movie's opening credits was Prairie Creek Church, a rural area Christian church located approximately six miles northeast of the city.

Portions of downtown Vinton were used in the movie "The Final Season".

== Notable people ==
- Desi Druschel, baseball coach, graduated from Vinton's high school and began his coaching career in Vinton.
- James Lorraine Geddes (1827–1887) A native of Scotland he moved to Vinton before the American Civil War where he joined as a private but rose in rank to brigadier general and later became Superintendent of the Iowa Institution for the Education of the Blind from 1867 to 1869.
- Mary E. Holland (1868–1915) A detective and fingerprint expert; She was born in Vinton.
- Mary Ingalls (1865–1928) was a student at the Iowa College for the Blind (now the Iowa Braille and Sight Saving School) in the early 1880s. The town is often mentioned in connection with the writings of her sister Laura Ingalls Wilder, author of Little House on the Prairie.
- Seaman A. Knapp (1833–1911), whose farming experiments led to the formation of the U.S. Department of Agriculture's Cooperative Extension System, claimed Vinton, Iowa, as his hometown and named Vinton, Louisiana, after it.
- Bing Miller (1894–1966) was a professional baseball player and coach for the Philadelphia Athletics; his walk-off hit won the final game of the 1929 World Series against the Chicago Cubs. He was born in Vinton.
- Sally Pederson (1951- ), who was the 45th lieutenant governor of Iowa, graduated from Washington High School in Vinton.
- Cato Sells (1859–1948) The Commissioner at the Bureau of Indian Affairs from 1913 to 1921 was born in Vinton.
- Buren R. Sherman (1836–1904) who would later become the 12th governor of Iowa, was a resident of Vinton from 1863 to 1866, during which he served as county judge for Benton County. His gravesite is in Vinton, in Evergreen Cemetery.
- Calvin Pearl Titus (September 22, 1879 – May 27, 1966), a soldier of the U.S. Army, was the last American standard-bearer. He received the Medal of Honor for his actions during the Battle of Peking of the Boxer Rebellion. He was born in Vinton.
- Everett Warner (1877–1963) was an artist born in Vinton who became a leading contributor to US naval camouflage during both World Wars.

== See also ==
- WaMaC Conference Vinton is a member of this high school athletic conference.
- National Register of Historic Places listings in Benton County, Iowa
