= Washington Township, Iowa County, Iowa =

Township in Iowa County, Iowa, U.S.

Coordinates: 41.8314°N 92.0278°W

Washington Township is a township in Iowa County, Iowa, United States.

== History ==
Washington Township was established in 1861.
