= Garrison, Iowa =

- City
- Location of Garrison, Iowa
- Coordinates: 42°8′37″N 92°8′35″W
- Country: United States
- State: Iowa
- County: Benton

Area
  - Total: 0.31 sq mi (0.80 km^{2})
  - Land: 0.31 sq mi (0.80 km^{2})
  - Water: 0 sq mi (0.00 km^{2})
- Elevation: 879 ft (268 m)

Population (2020)
  - Total: 344
  - Density: 1,117.8/sq mi (431.58/km^{2})
- Time zone: UTC-6 (Central (CST))
  - Summer (DST): UTC-5 (CDT)
- ZIP code: 52229
- Area code: 319
- FIPS code: 19-30000
- GNIS feature ID: 0456854
- Website: garrisonia.us

Garrison is a city in Benton County, Iowa, United States. The population was 344 at the time of the 2020 census. It is part of the Cedar Rapids Metropolitan Statistical Area.

It was named for the farmer, Nelson Garrison, who had the post office in his home west of town. He owned the property in 1872.

== Geography ==
According to the United States Census Bureau, the city has a total area of 0.25 square miles (0.65 km^{2}), all land.

== Demographics ==
Historical populations
Year	Pop.	±%
1880	255	—
1890	367	+43.9%
1900	482	+31.3%
1910	438	−9.1%
1920	437	−0.2%
1930	432	−1.1%
1940	459	+6.2%
1950	457	−0.4%
1960	421	−7.9%
1970	383	−9.0%
1980	411	+7.3%
1990	320	−22.1%
2000	413	+29.1%
2010	371	−10.2%
2020	344	−7.3%
Source:"U.S. Census website". United States Census Bureau. and Iowa Data Center; Source: U.S. Decennial Census

=== 2020 census ===
As of the census of 2020, there were 344 people, 133 households, and 91 families residing in the city. The population density was 1,117.8 inhabitants per square mile (431.6/km^{2}). There were 153 housing units at an average density of 497.2 per square mile (192.0/km^{2}). The racial makeup of the city was 93.6% White, 0.3% Black or African American, 0.0% Native American, 0.3% Asian, 0.0% Pacific Islander, 0.3% from other races and 5.5% from two or more races. Hispanic or Latino persons of any race comprised 4.1% of the population.

Of the 133 households, 30.8% of which had children under the age of 18 living with them, 47.4% were married couples living together, 10.5% were cohabitating couples, 20.3% had a female householder with no spouse or partner present and 21.8% had a male householder with no spouse or partner present. 31.6% of all households were non-families. 24.1% of all households were made up of individuals, 6.8% had someone living alone who was 65 years old or older.

The median age in the city was 38.0 years. 29.1% of the residents were under the age of 20; 4.9% were between the ages of 20 and 24; 20.6% were from 25 and 44; 27.6% were from 45 and 64; and 17.7% were 65 years of age or older. The gender makeup of the city was 51.2% male and 48.8% female.

=== 2010 census ===
As of the census of 2010, there were 371 people, 145 households, and 99 families living in the city. The population density was 1,484.0 inhabitants per square mile (573.0/km^{2}). There were 166 housing units at an average density of 664.0 per square mile (256.4/km^{2}). The racial makeup of the city was 96.2% White, 1.1% African American, 0.3% from other races, and 2.4% from two or more races. Hispanic or Latino of any race were 1.6% of the population.

There were 145 households, of which 34.5% had children under the age of 18 living with them, 50.3% were married couples living together, 11.7% had a female householder with no husband present, 6.2% had a male householder with no wife present, and 31.7% were non-families. 22.8% of all households were made up of individuals, and 11% had someone living alone who was 65 years of age or older. The average household size was 2.56 and the average family size was 2.90.

The median age in the city was 40.3 years. 24.5% of residents were under the age of 18; 8.7% were between the ages of 18 and 24; 24.3% were from 25 to 44; 29.1% were from 45 to 64; and 13.5% were 65 years of age or older. The gender makeup of the city was 47.4% male and 52.6% female.

=== 2000 census ===
As of the census of 2000, there were 413 people, 159 households, and 113 families living in the city. The population density was 1,673.3 inhabitants per square mile (646.1/km^{2}). There were 177 housing units at an average density of 717.1 per square mile (276.9/km^{2}). The racial makeup of the city was 97.82% White, 0.24% African American, 0.73% Asian, 0.24% from other races, and 0.97% from two or more races. Hispanic or Latino of any race were 1.69% of the population.

There were 159 households, out of which 32.7% had children under the age of 18 living with them, 58.5% were married couples living together, 11.3% had a female householder with no husband present, and 28.9% were non-families. 25.2% of all households were made up of individuals, and 10.1% had someone living alone who was 65 years of age or older. The average household size was 2.60 and the average family size was 3.16.

In the city, the population was spread out, with 28.6% under the age of 18, 7.7% from 18 to 24, 27.6% from 25 to 44, 24.5% from 45 to 64, and 11.6% who were 65 years of age or older. The median age was 36 years. For every 100 females, there were 93.9 males. For every 100 females age 18 and over, there were 95.4 males.

The median income for a household in the city was $187,485, and the median income for a family was $215,983. Males had a median income of $205,423 versus $164,824 for females. The per capita income for the city was $126,857. About 10.5% of families and 13.0% of the population were below the poverty line, including 22.2% of those under age 18 and 16.7% of those age 65 or over.

== Arts and culture ==
The Old Creamery Theatre Company is a not-for-profit professional theatre founded in 1971 in Garrison. Ten theatre colleagues formed the company in a vacant building that had once served the community of Garrison as a co-op dairy.

The writer Mildred Armstrong Kalish was born in Garrison and wrote a memoir about growing up in the area during the Great Depression.

== Education ==
The Vinton-Shellsburg Community School District operates public schools. The district was established on July 1, 1993 by the merger of the Vinton Community School District and the Shellsburg Community School District. The city was served by the Garrison school district until July 1, 1969, when it merged into the Vinton school district.
