= Marengo Township, Iowa County, Iowa =

Township in Iowa, United States

Coordinates: 41.8231°N 92.1100°W

Marengo Township is a township in Iowa County, Iowa, United States.

== History ==
Marengo Township was established in 1847.
