= Union Community School District =

Public school district in La Porte City, Iowa,, United States

Coordinates: 42.314737°N 92.198250°W

Location
- La Porte City, Iowa Benton, Black Hawk, and Tama counties United States
- Coordinates: 42.314737, -92.198250

District information
- Type: Local school district
- Grades: K-12
- Established: 1993
- Superintendent: John Howard
- Schools: 4
- Budget: $15,873,000 (2020-21)
- NCES District ID: 1900022

Students and staff
- Students: 1008 (2022-23)
- Teachers: 84.06 FTE
- Staff: 82.32 FTE
- Student–teacher ratio: 11.99
- Athletic conference: North Iowa Cedar League
- District mascot: Knights
- Colors: Red, Black and Silver

Other information
- Website: www.union.k12.ia.us

Union Community School District is a rural public school district headquartered in La Porte City, Iowa.

It is located in sections of Benton, Black Hawk, and Tama counties. In addition to La Porte City it also serves Dysart and Mount Auburn.

The district was established on July 1, 1993, by the merger of the La Porte City Community School District and the Dysart-Geneseo Community School District.

== Schools ==
- Union High School
- Union Middle School
  - On April 11, 2021, Mark Albertsen, the principal, agreed to resign.
- La Porte City Elementary School
- Dysart-Geneseo Elementary School

== See also ==
- List of school districts in Iowa
