= Clinton Township, Linn County, Iowa =

Township in Linn County, Iowa, U.S.

Coordinates: 41.9947°N 91.7894°W

Clinton Township is a township in Linn County, Iowa.

== History ==
Clinton Township was organized in 1854.
