= Luzerne, Iowa =

- City
- Location of Luzerne, Iowa
- Coordinates: 41°54′22″N 92°10′49″W
- Country: United States
- State: Iowa
- County: Benton

Area
  - Total: 0.13 sq mi (0.34 km^{2})
  - Land: 0.13 sq mi (0.34 km^{2})
  - Water: 0 sq mi (0.00 km^{2})
- Elevation: 938 ft (286 m)

Population (2020)
  - Total: 112
  - Density: 849.6/sq mi (328.04/km^{2})
- Time zone: UTC-6 (Central (CST))
  - Summer (DST): UTC-5 (CDT)
- ZIP code: 52257
- Area code: 319
- FIPS code: 19-47505
- GNIS feature ID: 0464635

Luzerne is a city in Benton County, Iowa, United States. The population was 112 at the time of the 2020 census. It is part of the Cedar Rapids Metropolitan Statistical Area.

== History ==
Luzerne was founded following construction of the Chicago and Northwestern Railway through the territory. Luzerne was named and platted as a town on the railroad by Isaac B. Howe, the Superintendent of the Iowa Div. of the railway, in 1868.

In October 1867 it was determined to relocate a station at "Buckeye" to an empty place in the plains midway between Blairstown and Belle Plaine. This move was a mere 2 miles to the east. The new station was named Luzerne, named by IB Howe for the Swiss town that he longed to visit. Buckeye no longer exists but would now be an empty place 2 miles to the west of Luzerne.

It might seem strange that there would be some advantage moving a station 2 miles; plus also a number of buildings that needed moving as well. The Buckeye station was run by railroad magnate John I Blair’s railroad group who owned the Cedar Rapids & Missouri River railroad which had originally planned the road to Omaha. The CR&MR was now under permanent lease to the Chicago & North Western, who wanted any excuse to squeeze out Blair if it could be to their benefit. Taking full advantage of the Luzerne station, Howe purchased the land and platted a new town there on 17 April 1868. This was shortly after the C&NW had connected with the Union Pacific's Transcontinental railroad in Council Bluffs, giving Luzerne a direct connection with the Pacific Coast the following year.

== Geography ==
According to the United States Census Bureau, the city has a total area of 0.12 square miles (0.31 km^{2}), all land.

== Demographics ==
Historical populations
Year	Pop.	±%
1880	265	—
1890	215	−18.9%
1900	169	−21.4%
1910	160	−5.3%
1920	180	+12.5%
1930	149	−17.2%
1940	135	−9.4%
1950	186	+37.8%
1960	136	−26.9%
1970	134	−1.5%
1980	114	−14.9%
1990	110	−3.5%
2000	105	−4.5%
2010	96	−8.6%
2020	112	+16.7%
Source: U.S. Decennial Census

=== 2020 census ===
As of the census of 2020, there were 112 people, 31 households, and 29 families residing in the city. The population density was 849.6 inhabitants per square mile (328.0/km^{2}). There were 35 housing units at an average density of 265.5 per square mile (102.5/km^{2}). The racial makeup of the city was 94.6% White, 1.8% Black or African American, 0.0% Native American, 0.0% Asian, 0.0% Pacific Islander, 0.0% from other races and 3.6% from two or more races. Hispanic or Latino persons of any race comprised 0.0% of the population.

Of the 31 households, 48.4% of which had children under the age of 18 living with them, 71.0% were married couples living together, 12.9% were cohabitating couples, 9.7% had a female householder with no spouse or partner present and 6.5% had a male householder with no spouse or partner present. 6.5% of all households were non-families. 0.0% of all households were made up of individuals, 0.0% had someone living alone who was 65 years old or older.

The median age in the city was 33.0 years. 33.9% of the residents were under the age of 20; 4.5% were between the ages of 20 and 24; 33.9% were from 25 and 44; 17.0% were from 45 and 64; and 10.7% were 65 years of age or older. The gender makeup of the city was 47.3% male and 52.7% female.

=== 2010 census ===
As of the census of 2010, there were 96 people, 34 households, and 26 families living in the city. The population density was 800.0 inhabitants per square mile (308.9/km^{2}). There were 38 housing units at an average density of 316.7 per square mile (122.3/km^{2}). The racial makeup of the city was 91.7% White, 2.1% African American, 4.2% from other races, and 2.1% from two or more races. Hispanic or Latino of any race were 5.2% of the population.

There were 34 households, of which 47.1% had children under the age of 18 living with them, 47.1% were married couples living together, 20.6% had a female householder with no husband present, 8.8% had a male householder with no wife present, and 23.5% were non-families. 20.6% of all households were made up of individuals, and 8.8% had someone living alone who was 65 years of age or older. The average household size was 2.82 and the average family size was 3.08.

The median age in the city was 28.5 years. 32.3% of residents were under the age of 18; 9.5% were between the ages of 18 and 24; 25% were from 25 to 44; 25% were from 45 to 64; and 8.3% were 65 years of age or older. The gender makeup of the city was 53.1% male and 46.9% female.

=== 2000 census ===
As of the census of 2000, there were 105 people, 37 households, and 31 families living in the city. The population density was 834.5 inhabitants per square mile (322.2/km^{2}). There were 39 housing units at an average density of 310.0 per square mile (119.7/km^{2}). The racial makeup of the city was 100.00% White.

There were 37 households, out of which 54.1% had children under the age of 18 living with them, 70.3% were married couples living together, 5.4% had a female householder with no husband present, and 16.2% were non-families. 13.5% of all households were made up of individuals, and 5.4% had someone living alone who was 65 years of age or older. The average household size was 2.84 and the average family size was 3.06.

In the city, the population was spread out, with 33.3% under the age of 18, 4.8% from 18 to 24, 31.4% from 25 to 44, 14.3% from 45 to 64, and 16.2% who were 65 years of age or older. The median age was 36 years. For every 100 females, there were 105.9 males. For every 100 females age 18 and over, there were 94.4 males.

The median income for a household in the city was $28,750, and the median income for a family was $34,688. Males had a median income of $30,833 versus $28,333 for females. The per capita income for the city was $14,747. None of the population and none of the families were below the poverty line.
