= Fayette Township, Linn County, Iowa =

Township in Linn County, Iowa, U.S.

Coordinates: 42.0897°N 91.8044°W

Fayette Township is a township in Linn County, Iowa. The township's population as of the 2020 census was 1,720.

== History ==
Fayette Township was organized in 1841.
