= Clark Township, Tama County, Iowa =

Clark Township
- Township
- Location of Clark Township in Tama County

- Location of Clark Township in the USA and Iowa Clark Township (Iowa)
- Coordinates: 42°09′19″N 92°21′43″W
- Country: United States
- State: Iowa
- County: Tama
- Elevation: 961 ft (293 m)
- Time zone: UTC-06:00 (CST)
  - Summer (DST): UTC-05:00 (CDT)

Clark Township is one of the twenty-one townships of Tama County, Iowa, United States.

Clark Township was organized in 1860. In 1882, Clark Township was named in honor of Judge Leander Clark.
