= Benton Community School District =

Public school district in Van Horne, Iowa, United States hick town USA

Coordinates: 42.010319°N 92.086204°W

Location
- Van Horne, Iowa Benton, Iowa and Tama counties United States
- Coordinates: 42.010319, -92.086204

District information
- Type: Local school district
- Motto: Quality Education for a Lifetime of Learning
- Grades: K-12
- Superintendent: Dr. Pamela Ewell
- Asst. superintendent(s): Doug Embray, Dr. James Bieschke
- Schools: 5
- Budget: $29,520,000 (2020-21)
- NCES District ID: 1904830

Students and staff
- Students: 1702 (2022-23)
- Teachers: 102.96 FTE
- Staff: 110.13 FTE
- Student–teacher ratio: 16.53
- Athletic conference: WaMaC Conference
- District mascot: Bobcats
- Colors: Blue and Yellow

Other information
- Website: www.benton.k12.ia.us

The Benton Community School District, or Benton Community, is a rural public school district headquartered in Van Horne, Iowa.

The district is mostly in Benton County with portions in Iowa and Tama counties. It comprises seven rural municipalities: Van Horne, Atkins, Blairstown, Elberon, Keystone, Newhall, and Norway. It also serves Watkins; additional students come from Marengo, and Garrison.

Dr. Pamela Ewell was hired as superintendent in 2019, after previous positions as superintendent at Mount Vernon and Van Buren County Schools.

== History ==
A consolidated school board from Keystone, Van Horne, Newhall and Blairstown met from 1962 to 1964 for the planning of the consolidated BCSD, which was officially formed in July 1964.

In 1988, Benton Community joined the WaMaC Conference after the Eastern Iowa conference was disbanded.

The Norway school district merged into the Benton district on July 1, 1995. The schools themselves consolidated earlier in a grade-sharing arrangement in the fall of 1991. From this consolidation, the movie The Final Season portrayed the final state title of the Norway High School baseball team.

== Schools ==
- Benton Community Elementary Schools: (Preschool through sixth grades):
  - Atkins Elementary School
  - Keystone Elementary School
  - Norway Elementary School
- The Middle School and High School (Seventh and Eighth grades) and (Ninth through Twelfth grades), respectively, are in a single facility in Van Horne.

== See also ==
- List of school districts in Iowa
- List of high schools in Iowa
- WaMaC Conference
