= Vinton-Shellsburg Community School District =

Public school district in Vinton, Iowa, United States, 52349

Coordinates: 41.662855°N 92.018800°W

Location
- Vinton, Iowa Benton and Buchanan counties United States
- Coordinates: 41.662855, -92.018800

District information
- Type: Public high school
- Grades: K-12
- Established: 1993
- Superintendent: Kyle Koeppen
- Schools: 5
- Budget: $25,072,000 (2020-21)
- NCES District ID: 1929310

Students and staff
- Students: 1555 (2022-23)
- Teachers: 114.42 FTE
- Staff: 142.37 FTE
- Student–teacher ratio: 13.59
- Athletic conference: WaMaC Conference
- District mascot: Vikings
- Colors: Gold and Black

Other information
- Website: https://www.vscsd.org/

Vinton-Shellsburg Community School District (VSCSD) is a school district headquartered in Vinton, Iowa.

The majority of the district is in Benton County with a small section in Buchanan County. In addition to Vinton it serves Shellsburg and Garrison.

The district was established on July 1, 1993, by the merger of the Vinton Community School District and the Shellsburg Community School District.

== History ==
Before the merger of 1993, the communities of Vinton and Shellsburg were two separate entities. The following is a timeline of what took place prior to consolidation.

- Due to a proposal by the Iowa legislature Vinton will look to consolidate with Shellsburg
- 1989-Begin grade sharing (Vinton School Board Meeting Minutes)
- 1991-School board is going to hold an official election on Dec. 17, 1991 (Benton County Auditor's Office).If passed the merger will become effective July 1st, 1993.

Final vote count was:

- Shellsburg Yes 160-107 No
- Vinton Yes 572-413 No

(Benton County Auditor's office)

Narrative: House File 2462 was passed in 1986 to provide tax incentives to Iowa taxpayers, to encourage small districts to merge with neighboring districts. This led to Vinton Community School District and Shellsburg Community School District to begin discussing the possibility of consolidation. In 1989 VCSD and SCSD began whole grade sharing, meaning that all students from Vinton and Shellsburg would share the same middle school and high school experience. Vinton School Board and Shellsburg School Board held an official election on December 17, 1991 in hope of consolidating the Vinton Community School District and the Shellsburg Community School District. If the vote was successful, consolidation would become effective July 1st of 1993.

Vinton Community School District and Shellsburg Community School District officially became Vinton-Shellsburg Community School District on July 1st, 1993.

Mary Jo Hainstock became the superintendent circa 2009 and was scheduled to end her job in 2020. Kyle Koeppen, the principal of Prairie Point Middle School in Cedar Rapids, replaced her as of July 1.

== Schools ==
- Vinton-Shellsburg High School
- Vinton-Shellsburg Middle School
- Shellsburg Elementary School
- Tilford Elementary School

Previously, it also operated Tilford Middle School, West Elementary School, and East/Lincoln Center.

== Vinton-Shellsburg High School ==
=== Athletics ===
The Vikings compete in the WaMaC Conference in the following sports:

- Baseball
  - 1998 Class 3A State Champions
- Basketball (boys and girls)
  - Girls' State Champions - 1984, 1995
- Bowling
  - Boys' 2016 Class 1A State Champions
  - Boys' 2024 Class 1A Individual State Champion- Vann Lessig
  - Boys' 2025 Class 1A State Champions.
- Cross Country (boys and girls)
- Football (Class 2A)
- Golf (boys and girls)
- Soccer (boys and girls)
- Softball
- Swimming (boys and girls)
- Tennis (boys and girls)
- Track and Field (boys and girls)
- Volleyball
- Wrestling
- E-Sports

== Notable alumni ==
- Desi Druschel, baseball coach

== See also ==
- List of school districts in Iowa
- List of high schools in Iowa
