= LBX Company =

American manufacturing company

LBX Link-Belt Excavators
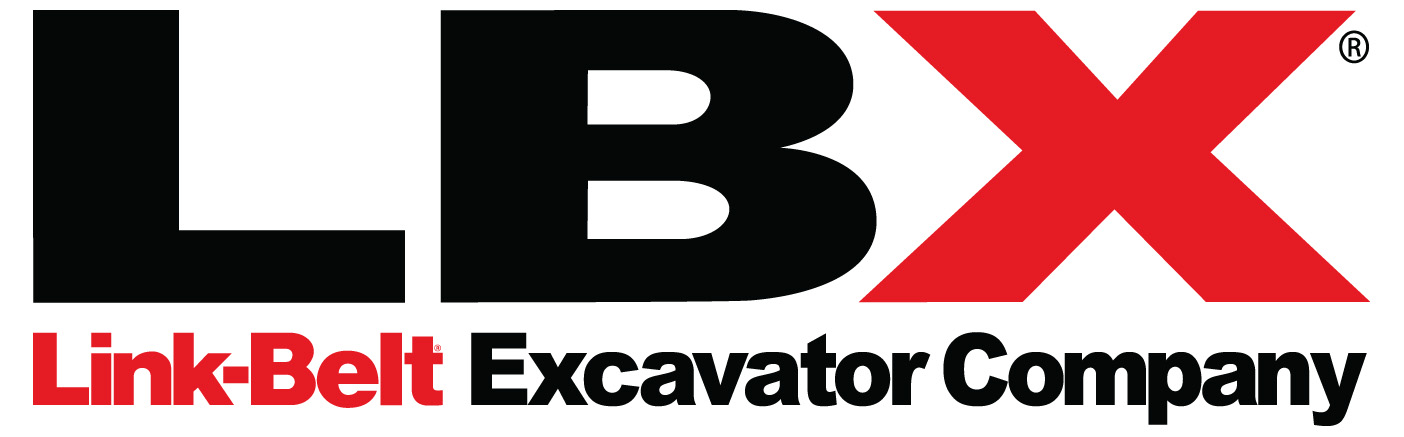
- Type: Wholly-owned subsidiary
- Industry: Heavy equipment
- Predecessors: Link-Belt Machinery Company (1986–1998); Link-Belt Company (1906–1986); Link-Belt Construction Equipment Company (1880–1906)
- Founded: 1880; 146 years ago in Belle Plaine, Iowa, US
- Founder: William Dana Ewart
- Headquarters: Lexington, Kentucky, US
- Key people: Eric Sauvage (President & CEO)
- Parent: Sumitomo Heavy Industries
- Website: en.lbxco.com

LBX (Link-Belt Excavators) is an American industrial company manufacturing excavators, forestry equipment and scrap material handlers.

Link-Belt is headquartered in Lexington, Kentucky. It is a subsidiary of Japanese conglomerate Sumitomo Heavy Industries.

LBX shares the Link-Belt brand with its sister company, Link-Belt Cranes. The two companies split in 1998. Sumitomo operates them as separate organizations.

== History ==
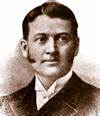
William (Will) Ewart

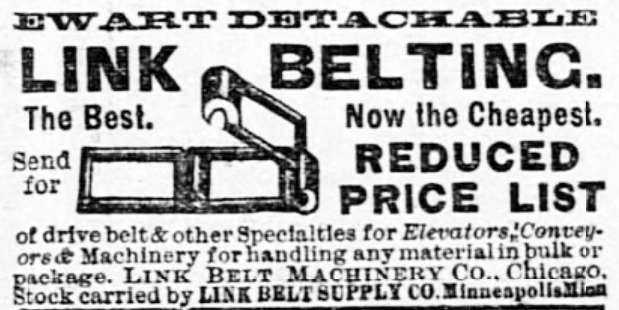
Link-Belt Ad - St. Paul Globe 1891 Note the open hook at the end of each square link, allowing replacement of broken links.

=== Expansion into coal and materials handling ===
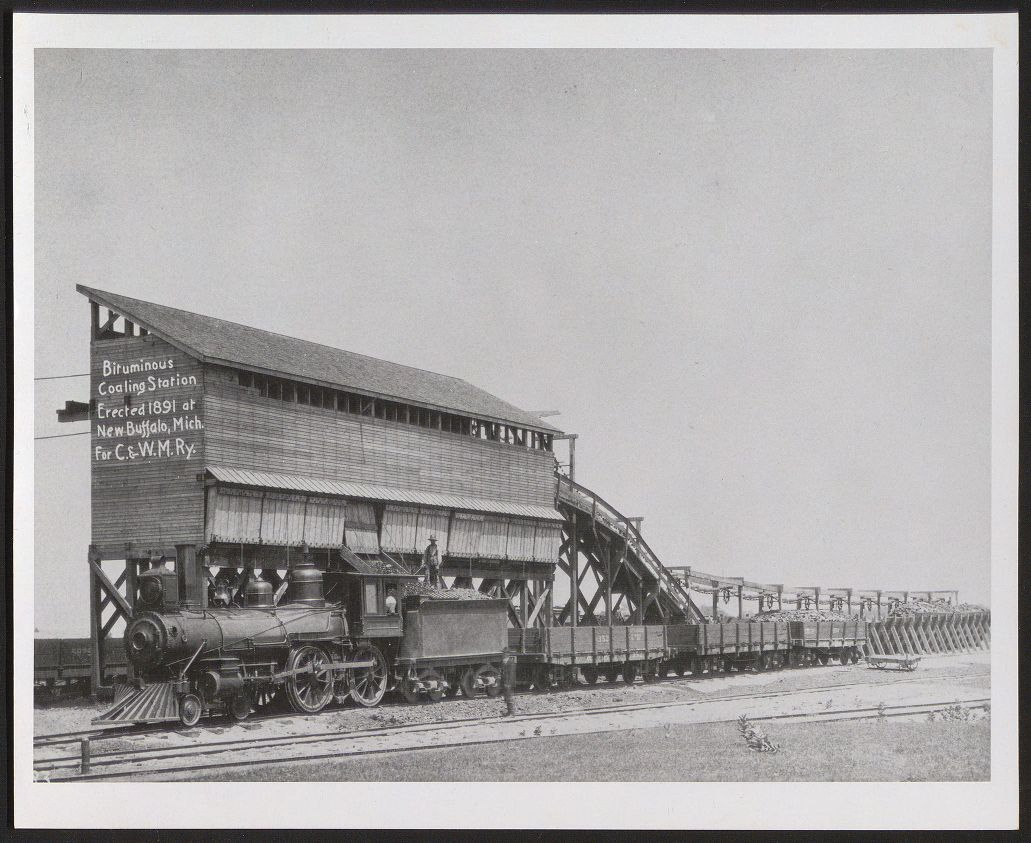
Coaling station constructed by Link-Belt Engineering. New Buffalo, Michigan circa 1891.

William Dana Ewart patented the Link-Belt drive chain in 1874, designed for conveyor and elevator drive systems.

Ewart quickly found customers requesting help engineering and constructing industrial facilities, especially coal-handling systems. During this time, coal fueled almost everything. Railroads especially used huge amounts of coal to power steam engines.

To serve the market, Ewart founded two new companies. In 1880, he created Link-Belt Machinery in Chicago, "to design, build, and supply accessory parts, and install elevating and conveying machinery employing Ewart chains."

Then in 1888, he formed Link-Belt Engineering in Philadelphia. This company built a factory in Philadelphia's Nicetown neighborhood.

By 1894, the three companies had constructed facilities for railroads including the New York Central and Hudson, the Philadelphia and Reading, and the Chicago and West Michigan. (See circa 1894 marketing booklet.)

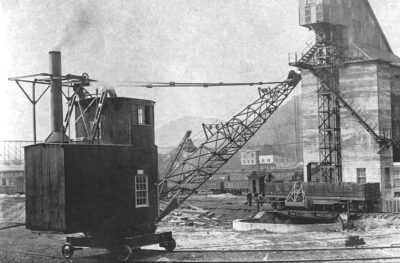
An early rail-chassis Link-Belt crane with clamshell loading bucket for coal handling. Note the large middle structure housing a locomotive-type steam engine.

=== Link-Belt coal-handling cranes ===
During this period, cranes and excavators shared many similarities. Huge steam shovels and steam cranes operated from railroad chassis. Workers laid rail tracks where the shovel was expected to work, then repositioned as required. Link-Belt Machinery quickly developed a steam-powered crane for wide-gauge rails. It used a clamshell-bucket for coal-handling. As shown in the photo at the right, the crane had a large house-like structure mounted on its rail chassis. The middle house-like structure held a steam engine like those used for locomotives.

Through the turn of the century, Link-Belt expanded its line of steam-powered, heavy-duty coal-handling cranes. The company also expanded into lighter, more versatile rail-based cranes.

=== 1906–1939: Link-Belt moves to Chicago, expands into excavation ===
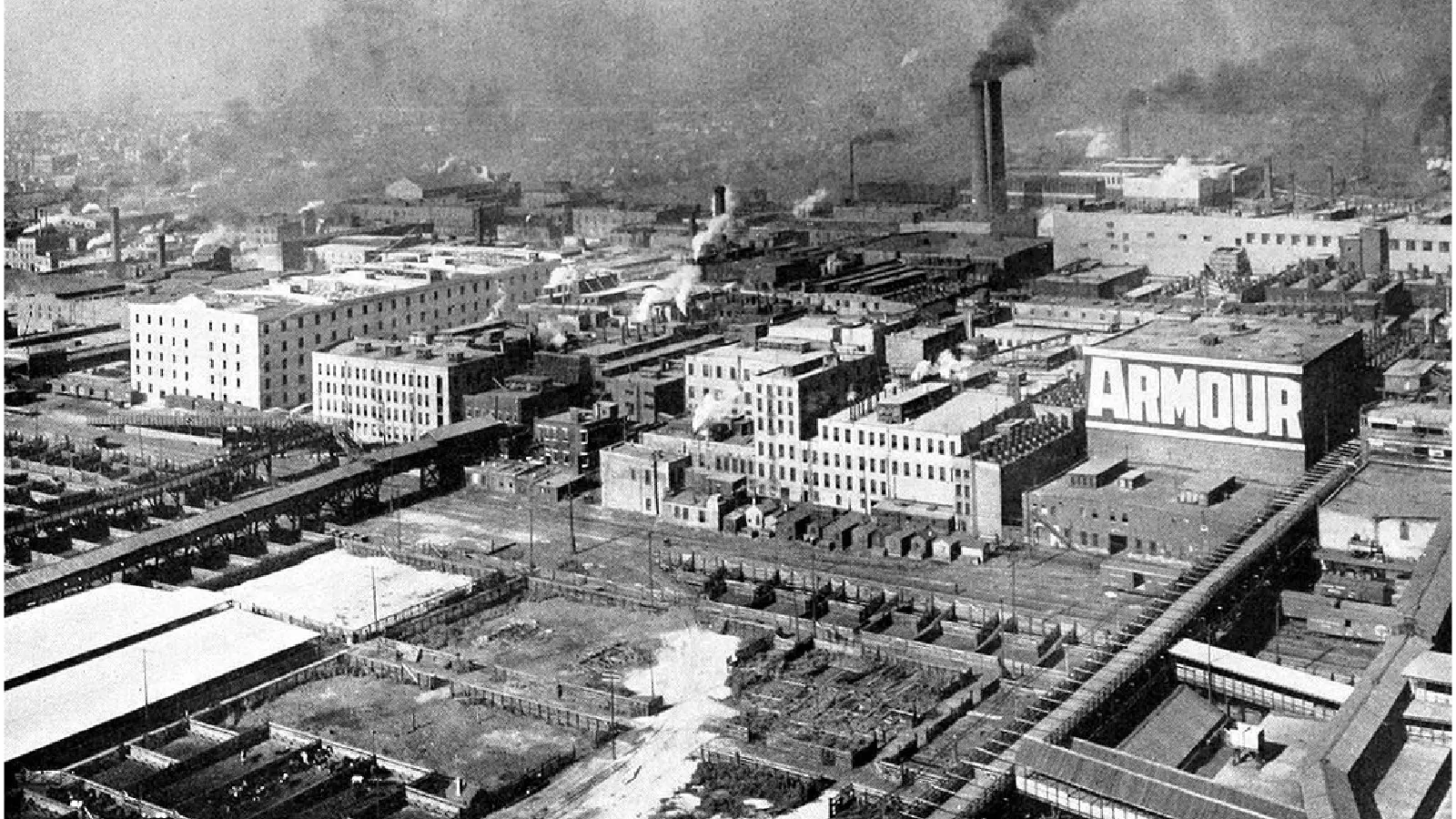
Link-Belt Chicago Factory Circa 1910

==== Move to Chicago and consolidation to single company ====
By the early 1900s, Link-Belt had moved well beyond its initial drive-chain origins. To support the growth, in 1906, the three Link-Belt companies consolidated into one publicly traded organization: the Link-Belt Company headquartered in Chicago. Charles Piez, who had started at Link-Belt as a Nicetown-based engineer-draftsman, became company president.

==== 1920–1939: Crawler chassis and dragline excavators ====
The 1900s brought new technologies to cranes and excavators. Continuous-track crawler systems moved the machines off rail platforms, allowing them to move freely. Dragline excavators expanded the power of crane-shovel systems.

By 1922, Link-Belt expanded into the crawler-mounted crane-shovel excavator market. The company continued building rail-based cranes and material-handling equipment, but the rail-based market continued shrinking.

By its 50th anniversary in 1925, Link-Belt operated ten large manufacturing plants and 27 branch offices across the United States. It offered materials-handling products, including locomotive- and crawler-type cranes and excavators. By the 1930s, Link-Belt excavators ranged from 3/4-yd to a 2-1/5-yd capacity.

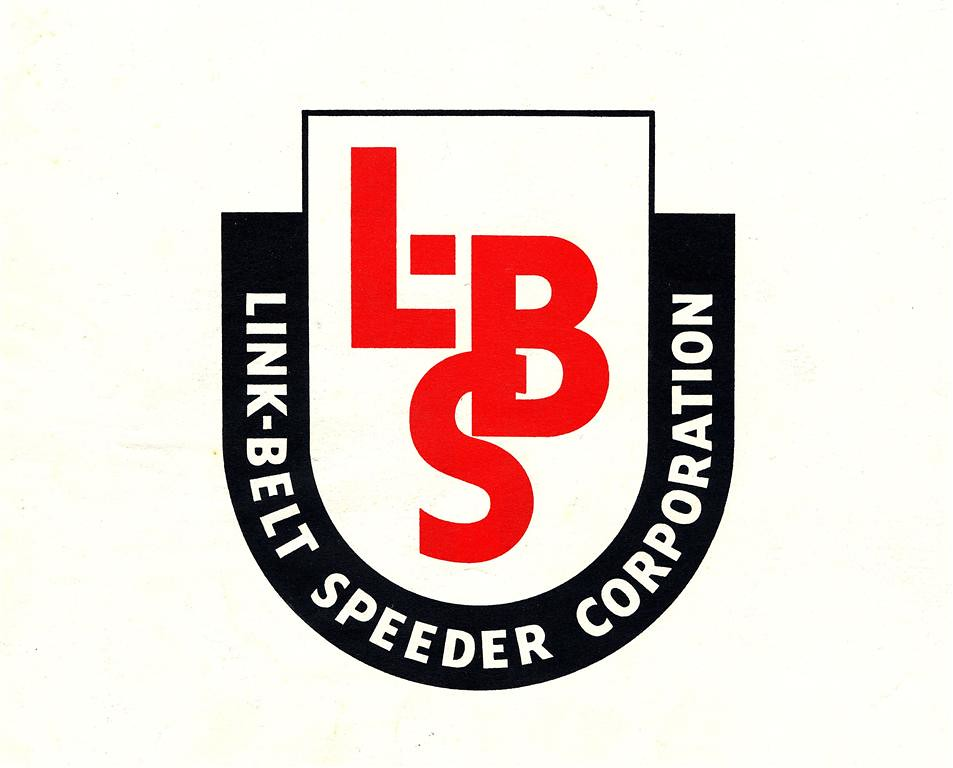
Link-Belt Speeder Logo

=== 1939: Link-Belt Speeder acquisition and Shovel-Cranes move to Cedar Rapids ===
In 1939, Link-Belt purchased Speeder Machinery, a Cedar Rapids, Iowa-based excavator company. This returned Link-Belt to the Eastern Iowa area where Will Ewart had invented his replaceable-link drive belt. Belle Plaine is 47 miles west of Cedar Rapids.

==== Speeder Machinery ====
Cedar Rapids-based Speeder Machinery built crane-shovels. It was an innovator in truck-based excavators, developing the world's first wheel-mounted excavator in 1922. It also built smaller-capacity crane-shovels, down to 3/8-yard.

The merged companies formed the Link-Belt Speeder Corporation as a wholly owned subsidiary of the Link-Belt Company of Chicago. The new Cedar Rapids location also offered a strong base of crane manufacturing experience, since it was also the home of a large Harnischfeger (P&H) crane factory.

=== Disruptive innovations: gasoline power and hydraulics ===
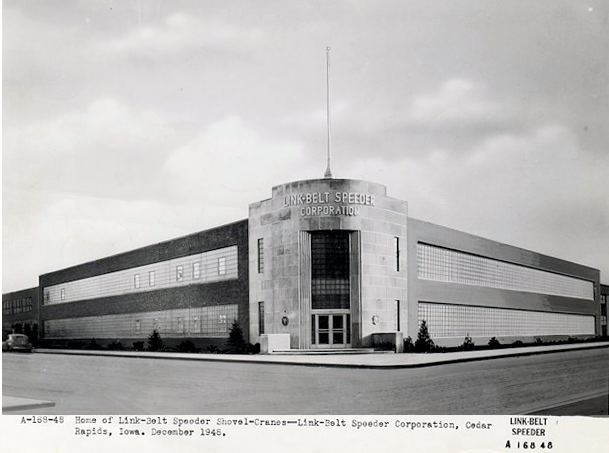
New Link-Belt Speeder Shovel-Crane Plant, opened in 1948, Cedar Rapids, Iowa

This period (1920–1970) put Link-Belt into business history for managing disruptive innovation. Harvard economist Clayton Christiansen analyzed the mechanical excavator industry to understand why disruptive technology innovations frequently cause well-managed companies to fail. Christiansen tracked excavator companies navigating two key technology changes: moving to gasoline power and switching to hydraulic mechanisms.

==== 1920s: Steam engines to gasoline and diesel power ====
The technology transition to gasoline power was less disruptive than the one to hydraulic mechanisms. Clayton identified Link-Belt as one of thirty-two steam shovel manufacturers operating in the early 1920s. These companies faced a radical technological change to gasoline power, changing their products' foundations. "Where steam shovels used steam pressure to power a set of steam engines to extend and retract the cables that actuated their buckets, gasoline shovels used a single engine and a very different system of gearing, clutches, drums, and brakes to wind and unwind the cable."

Most of the largest manufacturers survived this transition, making gasoline power more of a "sustaining innovation." Following gasoline power, 1928 and onward included less-radical transitions to diesel engines and electric motors. Clayton also noted the surviving companies integrated new articulated-boom technology, "which allowed longer reach, bigger buckets, and better down-reaching flexibility."

This disruptive period in excavator history set the background for the children's classic Mike Mulligan and His Steam Shovel, based on a machine from Marion Steam Shovel.

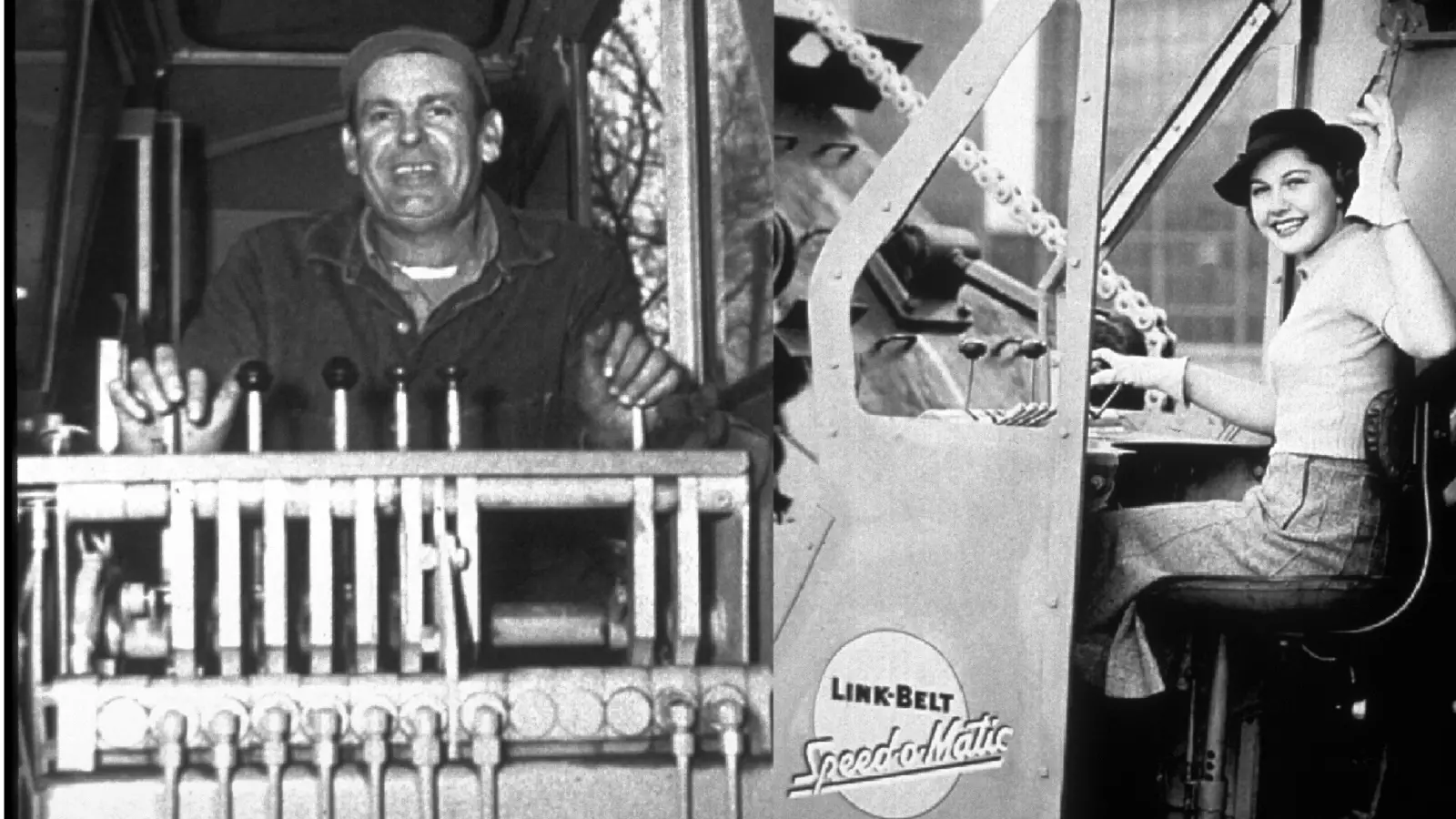
Marketing Materials for Link-Belt Speed-o-Matic Hydraulic Controls

==== 1936–1970: Hydraulics innovation leading to market leadership ====
Early adoption of hydraulics (1936 onward)

Clayton found Link-Belt was part of a much smaller group surviving the transition to hydraulics. Before hydraulic technology, cranes and crane-excavators used cable actuators to control movements. Operators would stand all day at the crane controls, pulling large levers to engage the cables. This was difficult, tiring work. The cables were also dangerous when they snapped.

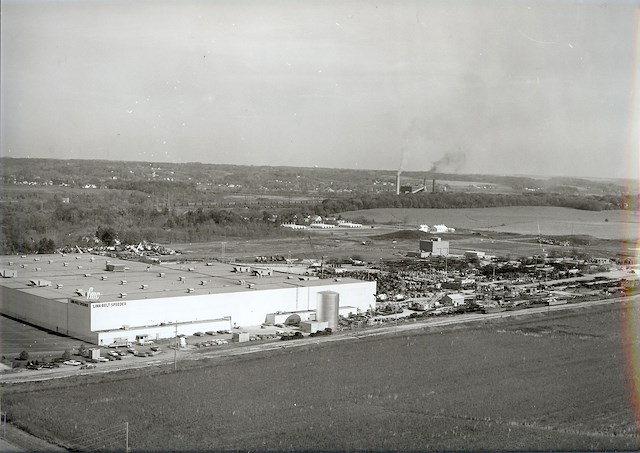
Second Link-Belt Speeder Crane Excavator Factory in Cedar Rapids, Iowa, Completed 1967

Hydraulic systems allowed the operator to sit and operate "fingertip" controls. This made the work less tiring and safer.

Link-Belt adopted the new technology early. It began the switch in 1936, before the 1939 Speeder acquisition. The company later branded its hydraulic controls as "Speed-o-Matic."

1950–1970: Market shakeout from disruptive hydraulic technology

Hydraulic innovators like Link-Belt drove a market shakeup. Clayton identifies Link-Belt as one of about 30 established cable-actuated excavator companies of the 1950s. By 1970, only four of these companies had survived by transitioning to hydraulics. These four were Link-Belt, Insley, Koehring, and Little Giant.

A few other companies survived by shifting to the upper end of the market, producing dragline excavators for strip mining. This included former market leader Marion Steam Shovel. which changed to Marion Power Shovel and focused on dragline systems including ones that helped dig the Panama Canal.

==== New major competitors, domestic and international ====
Link-Belt faced strong new competition from other hydraulic innovators, which Clayton identifies as Case, John Deere, Drott, Ford, JCB, Poclain, International Harvester, Caterpillar, O & K, Demag, Liebherr, Komatsu, and Hitachi.

A number of these entrants came to excavators through the invention of the backhoe. These small-capacity excavators were initially mounted on the back of tractors, either farm or industrial varieties. This opened the excavator market to general contractors.

Link-Belt Speeder succeeded in competing against the new entrants, making the company a showcase for managing disruptive innovation. Link-Belt Speeder's rapid adoption of the new hydraulic technologies let it survive where most other established companies failed.

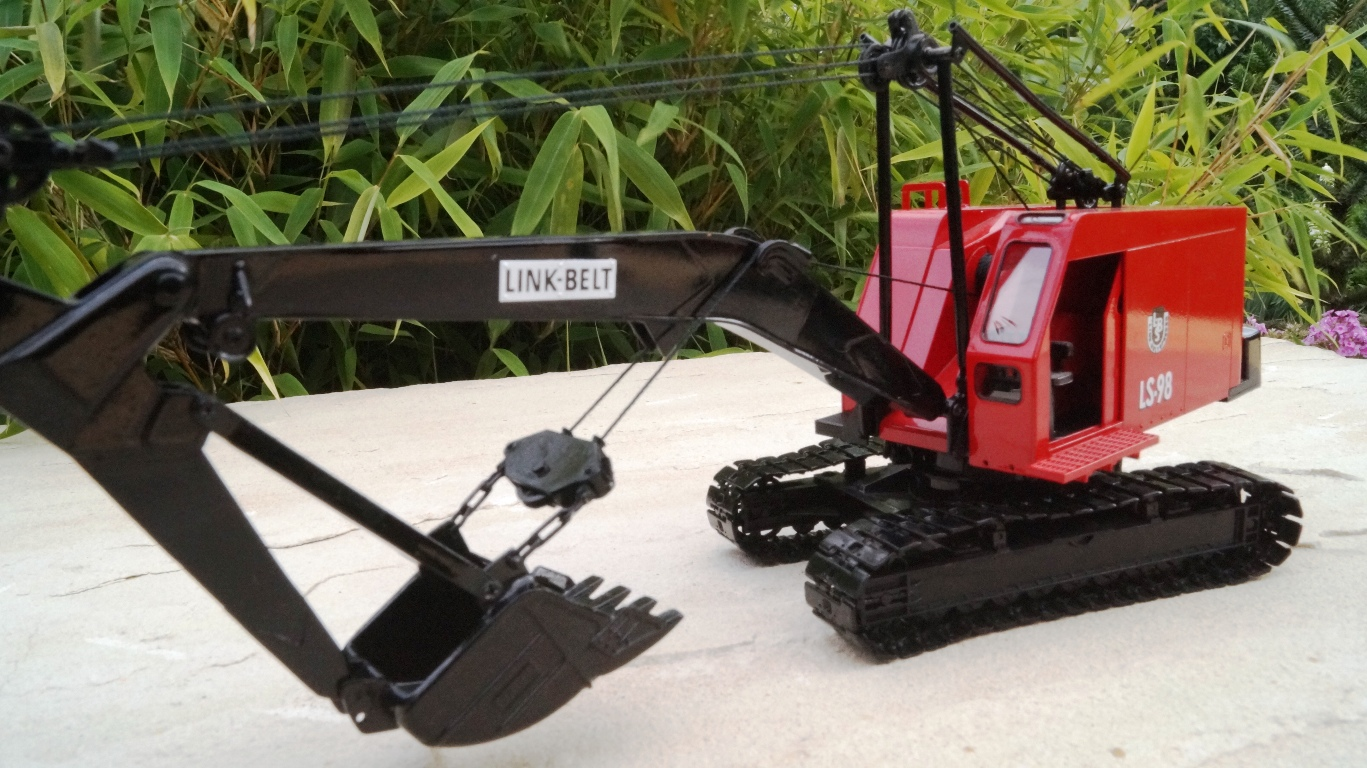
Toy version of Link-Belt LS-98 excavator. The LS-98 crane and crane-excavator continued in production for 42 years (1954 to 1996).

==== Worldwide market leadership and LS-98 ====
This early adoption of hydraulics launched Link-Belt Speeder to the forefront of the crane and crane-shovel excavator markets worldwide. The 1954 flagship model LS-98 platform offers a key example. The LS-98 is one of the most successful pieces of construction equipment ever built. Production of these cranes and crane-excavators continued for over 42 years (1954 to 1996). Link-Belt built over 7,000 units and LS-98 units are still operating around the world.

Link-Belt Speeder faced growing competition from Japanese manufacturers. Japanese labor was cheaper than America's. To address this and expand sales in Asia, Link-Belt Speeder established an agreement with Japan's Sumitomo Heavy Industries. Sumitomo began manufacturing Link-Belt products under license, selling them in Asia. Link-Belt also began contracting with Sumitomo to build parts and models for sale in the USA.

=== 1965–1986: FMC Link-Belt ===
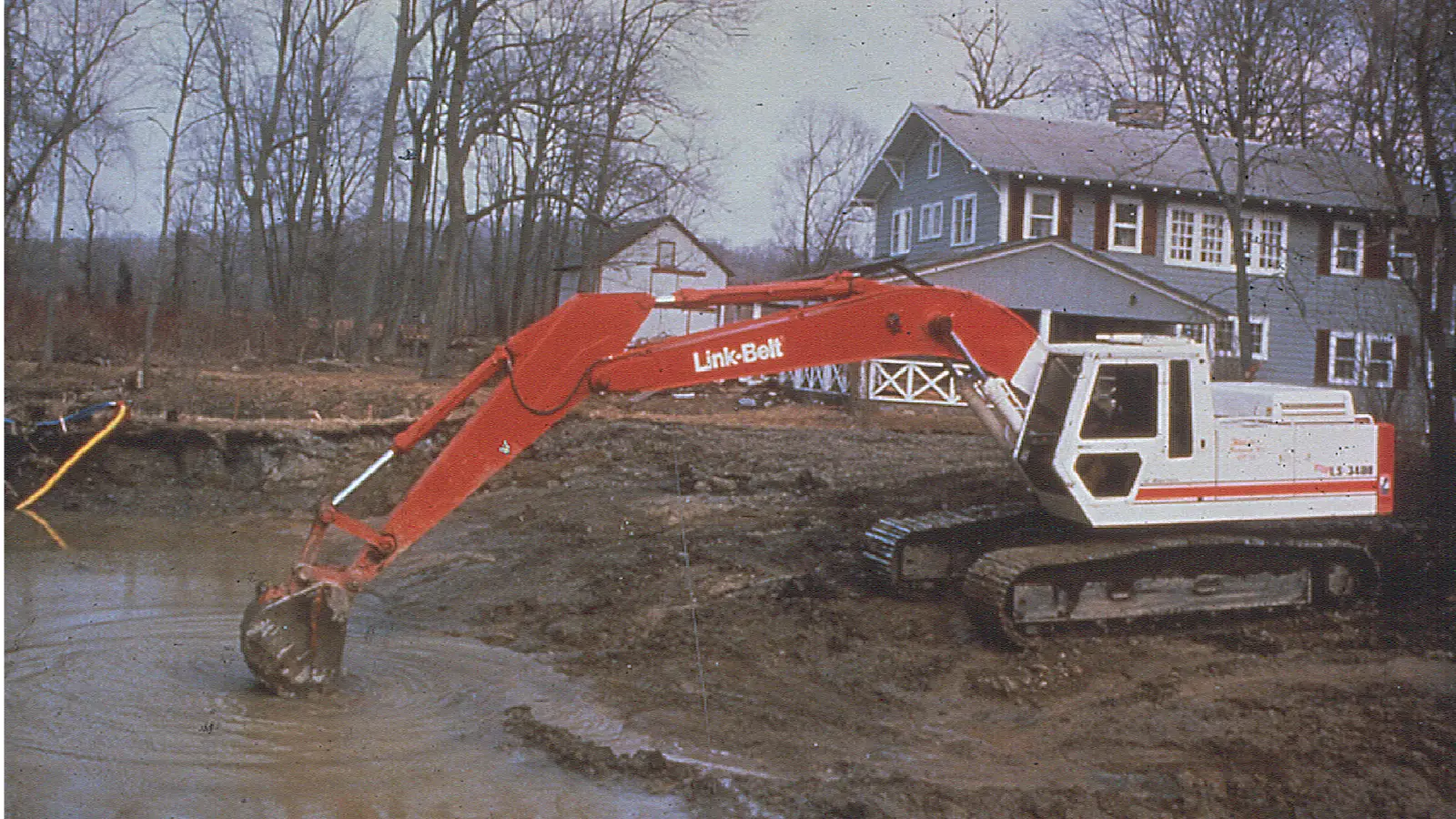
FMC Link-Belt Excavator, 1960

In 1965, FMC Corporation purchased Link-Belt Speeder as a subsidiary, later making it the FMC Construction Equipment Group. It dropped the Speeder name and branded products as FMC Link-Belt.

==== Long-term capital expansion ====
FMC began an aggressive long-term capital expansion plan for Link-Belt's manufacturing facilities and product lines. For example, FMC tried to leverage Link-Belt's expertise into its fire truck division. Working with Ladder Towers Inc. (LTI), FMC Link-Belt developed aerial ladder trucks. This venture was unsuccessful and shut down in 1990.

==== 1979 peak in US-based production ====
By 1979, FMC Link-Belt reached its American production peak. For example, the two Cedar Rapids factories employed 2,300 workers. Sumitomo also sold many Japanese-built, Link-Belt branded models of cranes and excavators.

==== Early 1980s recession and consolidation to Lexington ====
FMC's expansion of Link-Belt ended with the early 1980s recession. Worldwide inflation combined with a double-dip recession dramatically reduced the need for new construction equipment. With the prime interest rate peaking at 22%, businesses cut construction plans and FMC began layoffs. The United States had reached its peak industrialization and would never again reach 1979 levels.

In an effort to save the older Cedar Rapids plants, FMC reorganized the construction group. It merged control of the Cedar Rapids plants with its Kentucky facilities. The American recession ended by 1983, but worldwide demand continued to be slow and cutbacks continued into 1984. From its 1979 peak of 2,300 workers in two Cedar Rapids plants, FMC Link-Belt reduced to only 450 Iowa employees by 1985.

Across the FMC Link-Belt factories, utilization remained low at 25%. In February 1985, FMC announced the closure of both Cedar Rapids plants. FMC consolidated Link-Belt operations to the newer Kentucky plants in Lexington and Bowling Green. A third plant in Milan, Italy also remained open. In Cedar Rapids, FMC laid off the remaining 380 Cedar Rapids factory workers, leaving 70 engineers and marketing employees in Iowa.

As the consolidation later continued, the remaining Cedar Rapids workers were laid off. The Bowling Green factory also shut down. All American Link-Belt operations moved to Lexington.

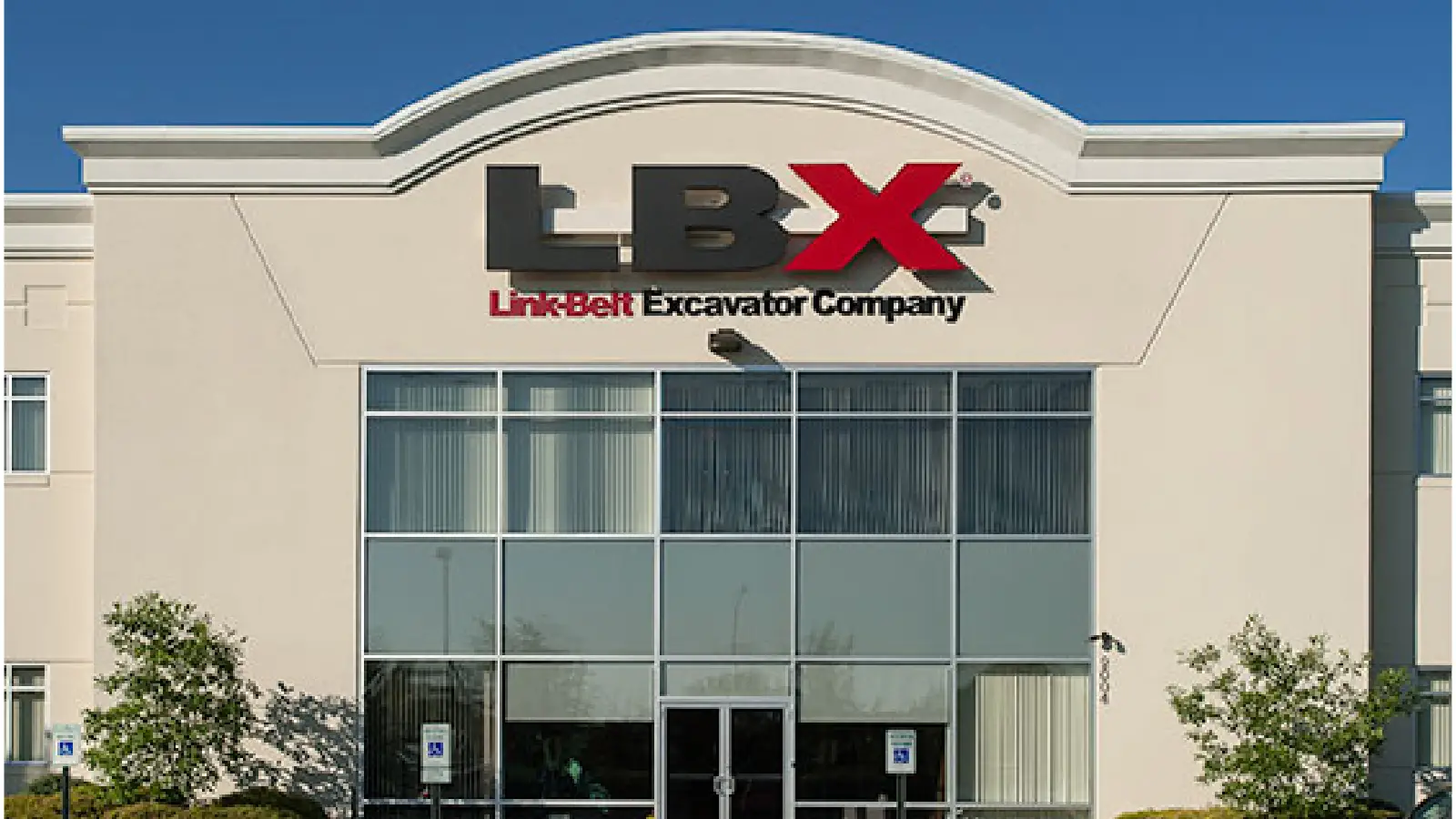
LBX Link-Belt Excavator Facility, 2000

==== Sumitomo, Link-Belt Excavators and Link-Belt Cranes ====
By 1986, FMC still struggled recovering from the recession. As American deindustrialization continued, FMC turned to long-time Japanese partner Sumitomo Heavy Industries. In 1986, FMC and Sumitomo expanded their relationship by forming a joint venture (JV) named Link-Belt Construction Equipment Company.

By the late 1990s, excavators had developed past crane-shovels and become the modern hydraulic machines of today. The Link-Belt LS-98 ceased production in 1996 after 42 years of production. This mostly eliminated the economy of scale between crane and excavator manufacture.

To address this, in 1998 the FMC/Sumitomo JV spun off excavator products to a new JV with Case Corporation. The excavator company became LBX LLC, building and selling Link-Belt branded excavators.

Sumitomo later acquired full ownership of both joint ventures. It now operates LBX Excavators separately from Link-Belt Cranes.

== Gallery ==
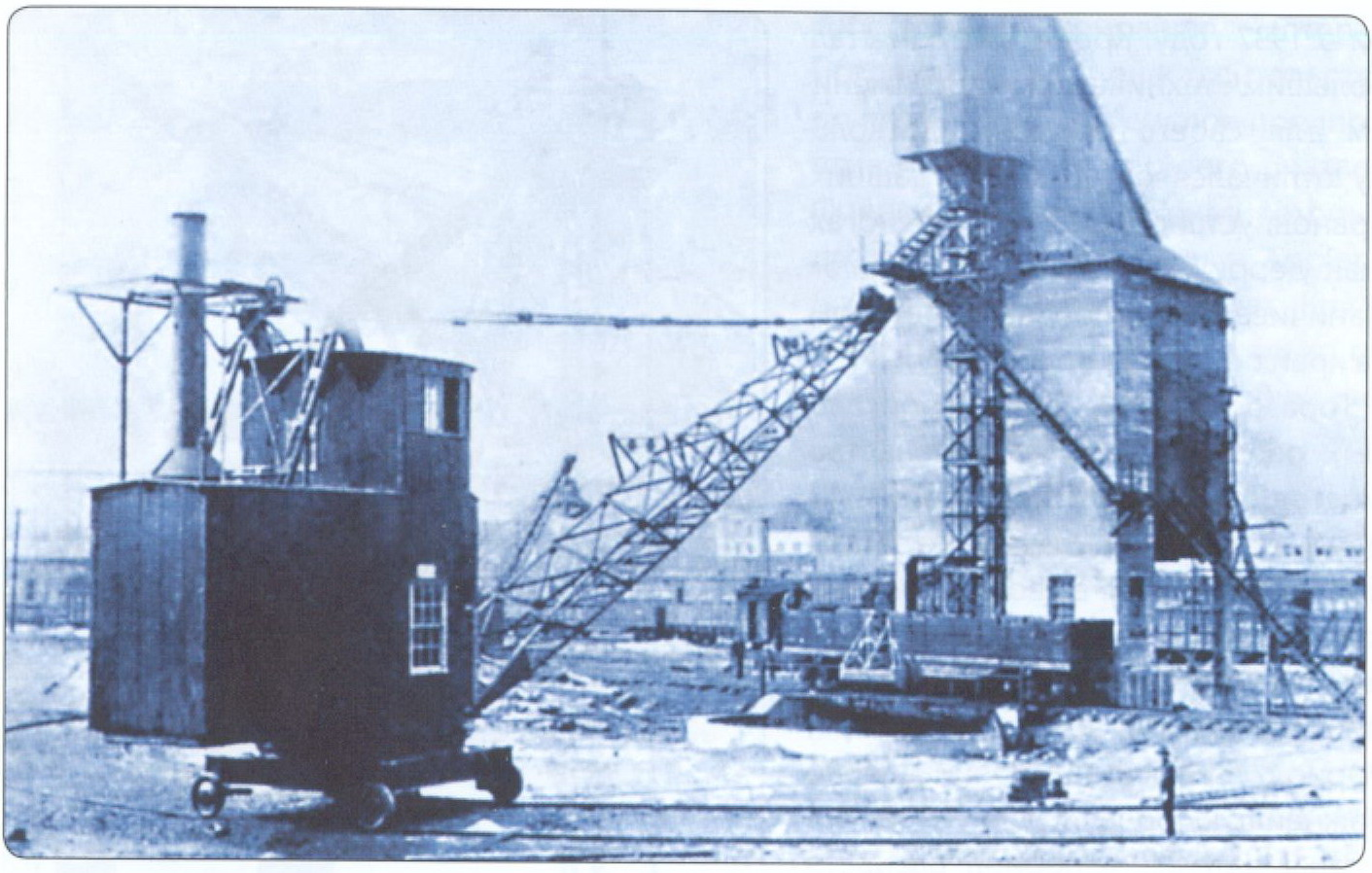
Link-Belt Crane Excavator, 1890

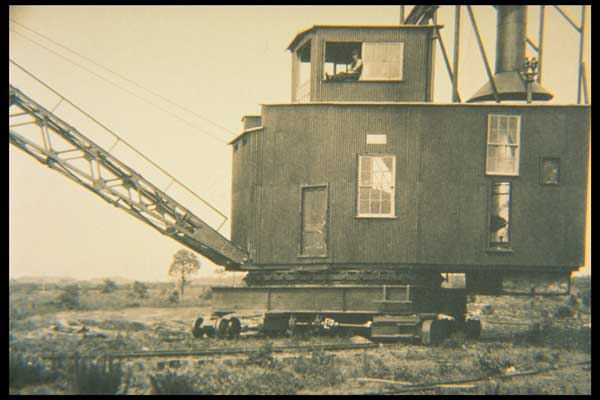
Link-Belt steam shovel crane circa 1890

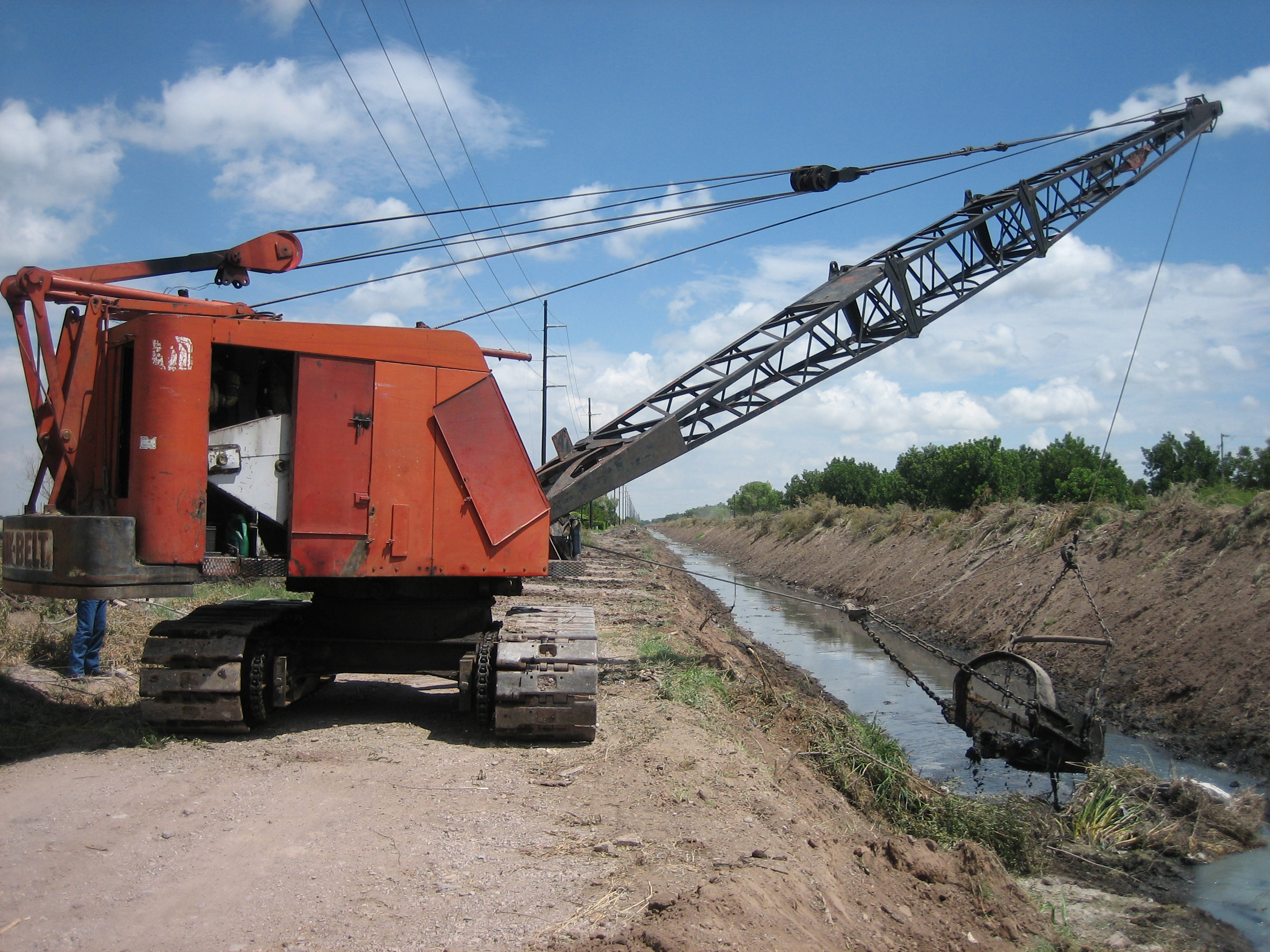
Vintage Link-Belt excavator

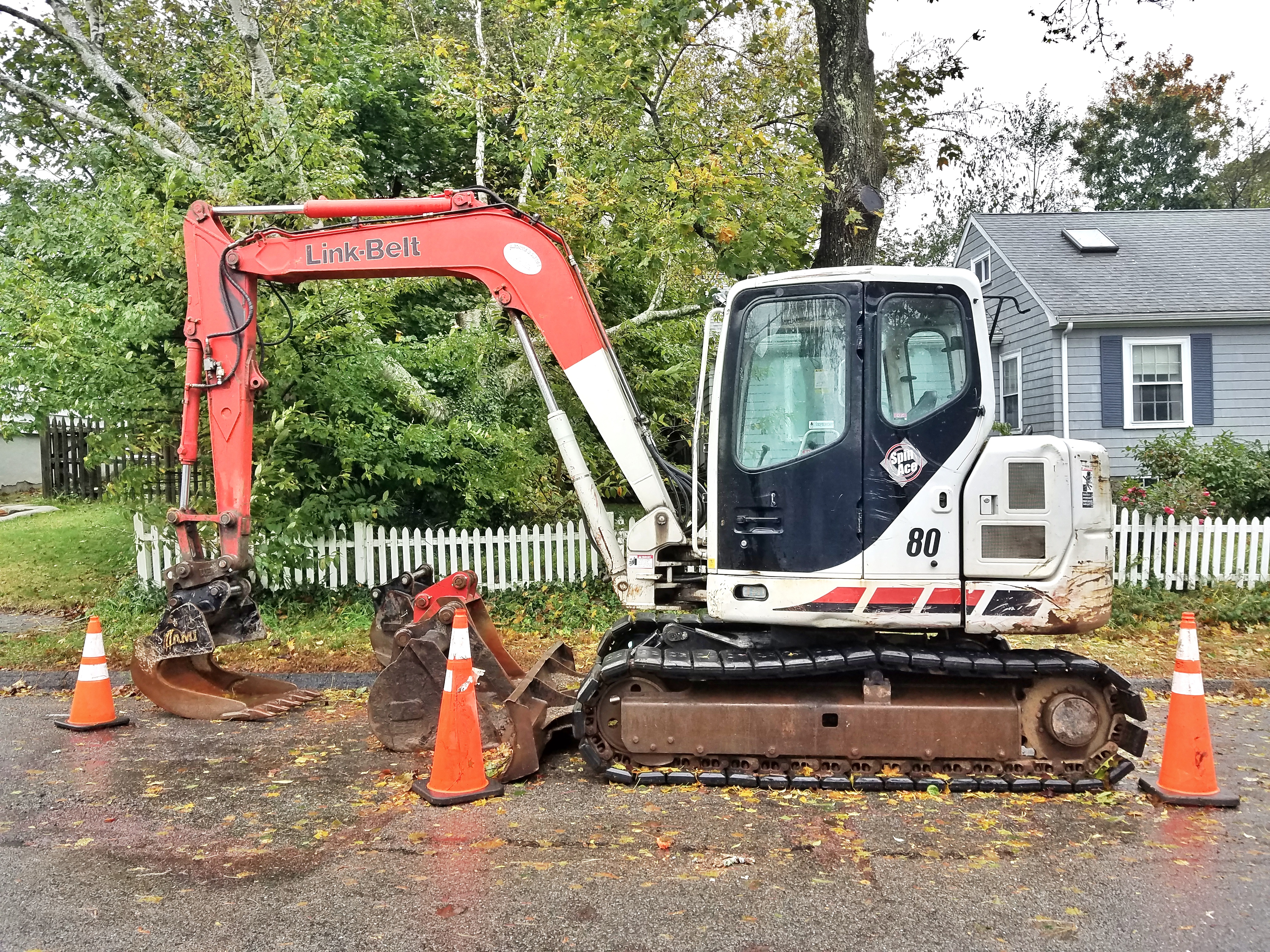
Link-Belt 80 Spin Ace excavator.

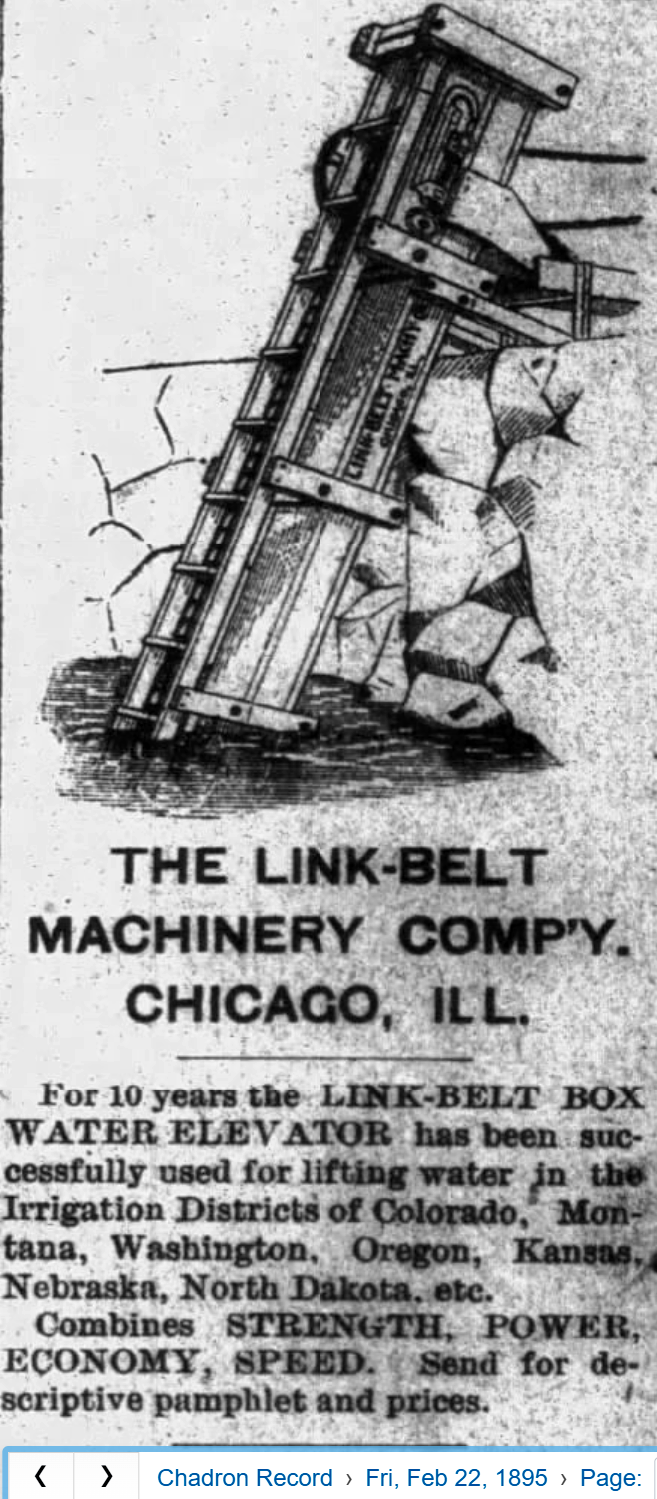
Link-Belt Box Water Elevator Irrigation System, Advertisement in Chadron Record, Feb 22 1895

== See also ==
- Liebherr Group
- Manitowoc Cranes
- Tadano
- Terex
