= Link Belt =

Link-Belt or Link Belt may refer to:

- A linked-belt drive, a type of chain drive
- Link-Belt Cranes, a subsidiary of Sumitomo Group.
- LBX Link-Belt Excavators, another Sumitomo subsidiary.
- Link Belt station, a SEPTA railway station in Montgomeryville, Pennsylvania
