= William Dana Ewart =

American inventor (1851–1908)

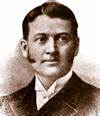
William (Will) Ewart

William Dana Ewart (April 24, 1851 – May 3, 1908) invented and patented the linked belt, a square detachable link for chain belts, on September 1, 1874. The metal chain "linked belt" replaced the leather and strap belts used on agricultural equipment at the time.

Ewart was inducted into the Association of Equipment Manufacturers Hall of Fame in 1996 at CONEXPO-CONAGG.

== History ==
=== Invention of linked-belt drive chain ===
In 1874, William (Will) Dana Ewart sold farm implements in Belle Plaine, Iowa. He saw metal drive-chain belts on harvesters would break, requiring difficult repairs and delaying harvests.

Ewart invented a new version using detachable links -- a "linked belt." Farmers could carry extra links into the field and then quickly repair a broken drive chain.

The new drive chain was useful far beyond farm equipment, integrating into any machinery transmitting power via a sprocket and chain. In 1875, Ewart and investors founded the Ewart Manufacturing Company to manufacture the new "Ewart Detachable Link-Belting" and matching sprockets.

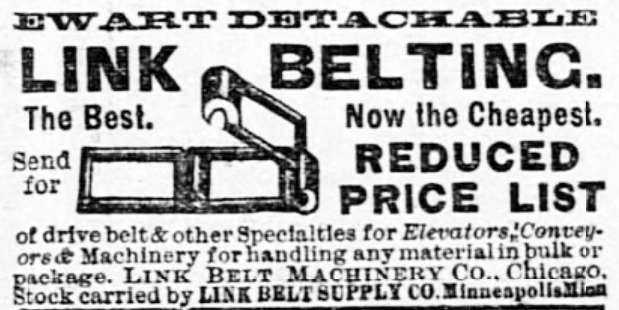
Link-Belt Ad - St. Paul Globe 1891 Note the open hook at the end of each square link, allowing replacement of broken links.

=== Expansion into coal and materials handling ===
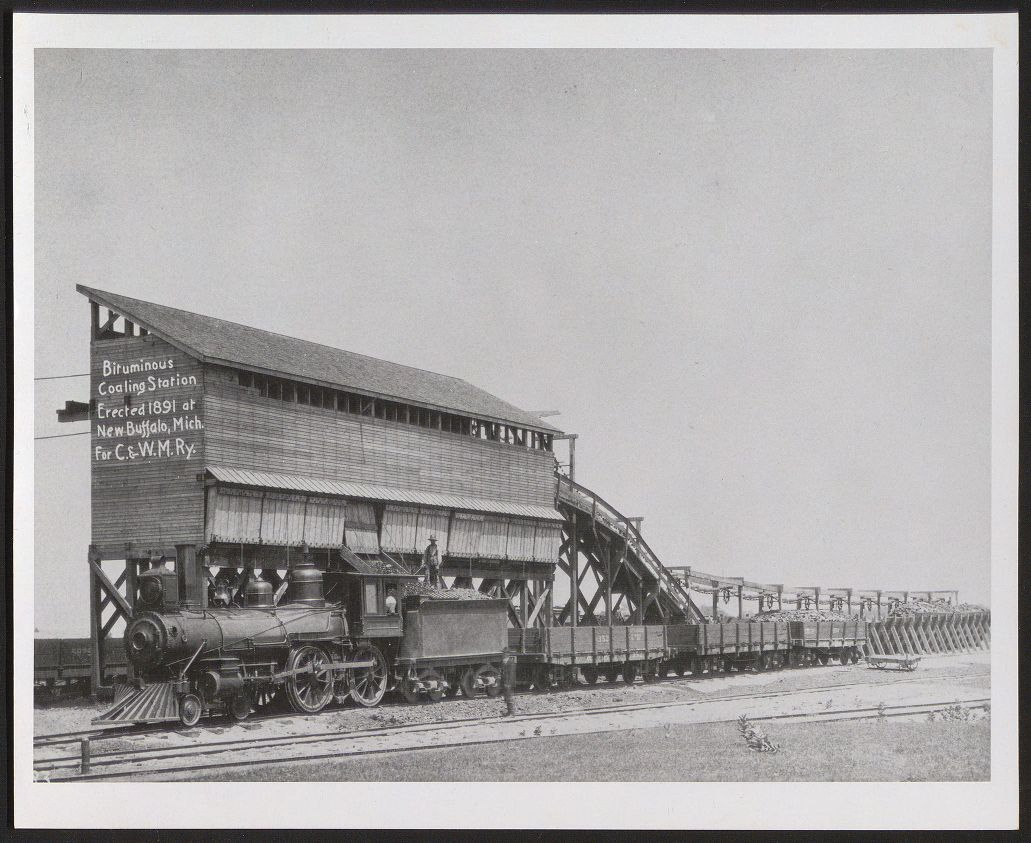
Coaling station constructed by Link-Belt Engineering. New Buffalo, Michigan circa 1891.

Ewart quickly found customers requesting help engineering and constructing industrial facilities, especially coal-handling systems. During this time, coal fueled almost everything. Railroads especially used huge amounts of coal to power steam engines.

To serve the market, Ewart founded two new companies. In 1880, he created Link-Belt Machinery in Chicago, "to design, build, and supply accessory parts, and install elevating and conveying machinery employing Ewart chains."

Then in 1888, he formed Link-Belt Engineering in Philadelphia. This company built a plant in Philadelphia's Nicetown neighborhood.

By 1894, the three companies had constructed facilities for railroads including the New York Central and Hudson, the Philadelphia and Reading, and the Chicago and West Michigan. (See circa 1894 marketing booklet.)

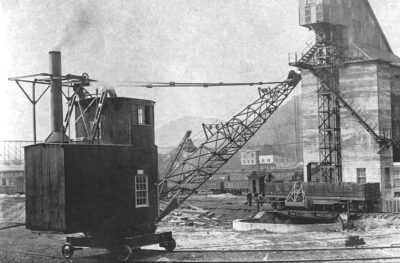
An early rail-chassis Link-Belt crane with clamshell loading bucket for coal handling. Note the large middle structure housing a locomotive-type steam engine.

=== Link-Belt coal-handling cranes ===
During this period, cranes and excavators shared many similarities. Huge steam shovels and steam cranes operated from railroad chassis. Workers laid rail tracks where the shovel was expected to work, then repositioned as required. Link-Belt Machinery quickly developed a steam-powered crane for wide-gauge rails. It used a clamshell-bucket for coal-handling. As shown in the photo at the right, the crane had a large house-like structure mounted on its rail chassis. The middle house-like structure held a steam engine like those used for locomotives.

Through the turn of the century, Link-Belt expanded its line of steam-powered, heavy-duty coal-handling cranes. The company also expanded into lighter, more versatile rail-based cranes.

=== Retirement, death and legacy ===
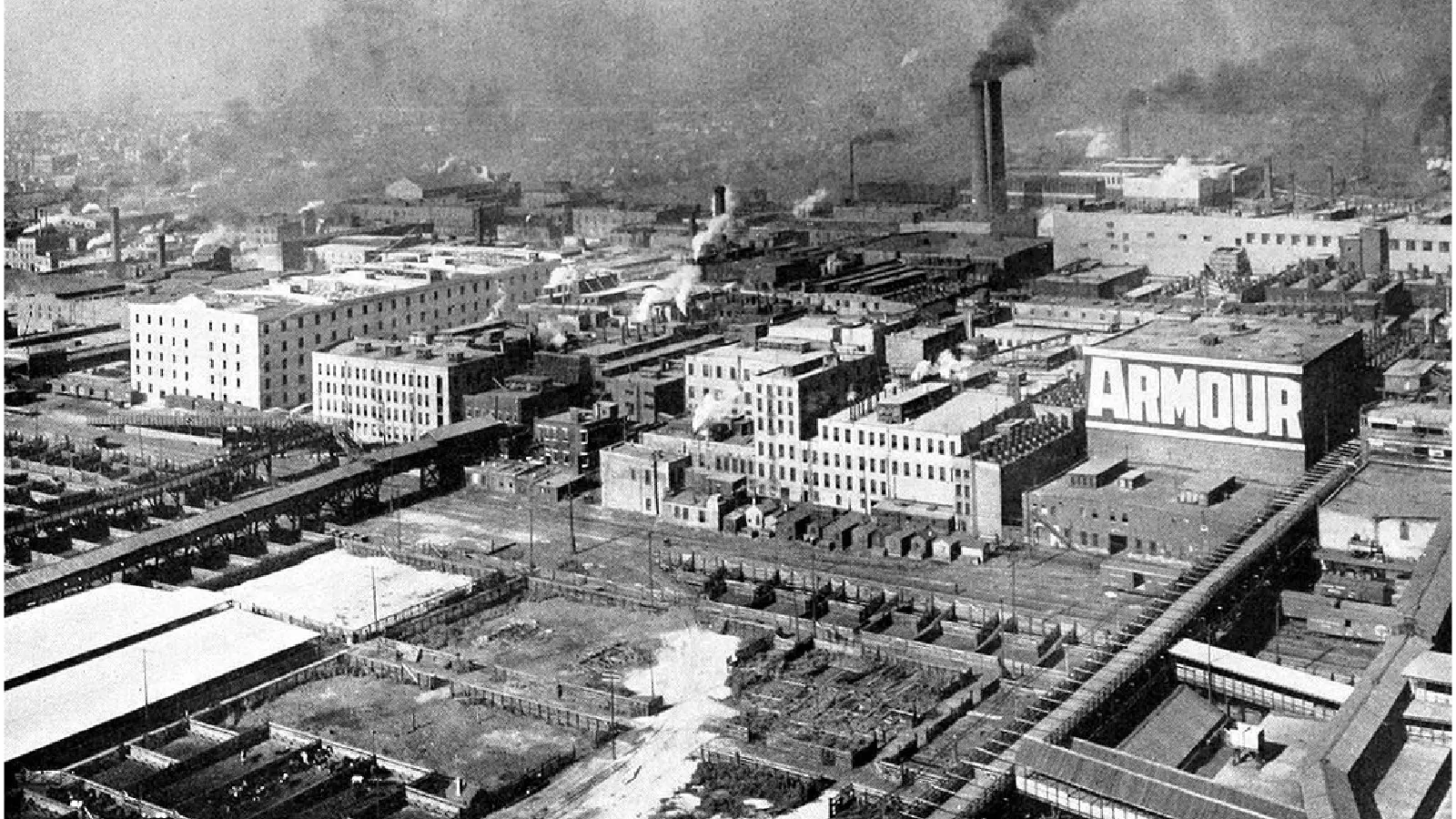
Link-Belt Chicago Factory Circa 1910

==== Declining health and life in Italy ====
By the early 1900s, Link-Belt had moved well beyond its initial drive-chain origins. Ewart was leading several companies. As he became increasingly ill, Ewart mostly retired and moved to Italy.

==== Move to Chicago and consolidation to a single company ====
Likely as part of Ewart's retirement, in 1906 the three Link-Belt companies consolidated into one publicly traded organization: the Link-Belt Company headquartered in Chicago. Charles Piez, who had started at Link-Belt as a Nicetown-based engineer-draftsman, became company president.

Death in Italy and legacy

Ewart died in Rome on May 3, 1908. The Association of Equipment Manufacturers inducted him into its Hall of Fame in 1996 at CONEXPO-CONAGG.

Ewart's Link-Belt companies live on as Link-Belt Cranes and LBX Link-Belt Excavators.
