= Link-Belt Cranes =

American company

- Company type: Wholly-owned subsidiary
- Industry: Heavy equipment
- Predecessors: Link-Belt Machinery Company (1986–1998); Link-Belt Company (1906–1986); Link-Belt Construction Equipment Company (1880–1906)
- Founded: 1880; 146 years ago in Belle Plaine, Iowa, US
- Founder: William Dana Ewart
- Headquarters: Lexington, Kentucky, US
- Key people: Melvin Porter (President & CEO)
- Products: Cranes; Mobile cranes
- Parent: Sumitomo Heavy Industries
- Website: linkbelt.com

Link-Belt Cranes is an American manufacturer of heavy construction equipment, best known for its telescopic and lattice boom cranes. Founded in 1880, the company traces its origins to the invention of the detachable “link-belt” chain drive by Iowa inventor William Dana Ewart. Over time, Link-Belt expanded from agricultural machinery into cranes, excavators, and material-handling equipment.

Today, Link-Belt Cranes is headquartered in Lexington, Kentucky, and operates as a wholly owned subsidiary of Sumitomo Heavy Industries. The company designs and manufactures a range of mobile and crawler cranes for construction, infrastructure, and industrial applications.

== History ==
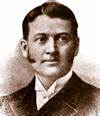
William Dana Ewart, Iowa Inventor

=== Invention of Linked-Belt chain drive ===
In 1874, William Dana Ewart sold farm implements in Belle Plaine, Iowa. He invented a new harvester drive-chain which used a square detachable link—a "linked belt."

"William Ewart recognized that harvesters with continuous chain belt drives made up of square links and flat links would wear unevenly and break in one spot. Once broken, the entire chain belt had to be taken back to the barn for needed repairs, thus delaying all harvesting."

In 1875, Ewart and investors founded the Ewart Manufacturing Company to build and market the new detachable drive chain. This later changed to Ewart Detachable Link-Belt.

=== Expansion into coal handling ===
In the 1880s, Ewart's company looked to expand into coal handling. Ewart Detachable Link-Belt became Link-Belt Machinery Company. In 1888, the company created a separate Link-Belt Engineering Company for its development efforts.

During this period, cranes and excavators shared many similarities. Steam shovels were mounted on railroad chassis. Temporary rail tracks were laid by workers where the shovel was expected to work, then repositioned as required.

The railroad market provided a successful focus for the growing companies. Link-Belt Machinery began manufacturing railroad coal-handling cranes. Link-Belt Engineering began custom designing and building locomotive coaling stations, building facilities railroads like the New York Central and Hudson, the Philadelphia and Reading, and the Chicago and West Michigan. In 1894, Link-Belt developed the first wide-gauge, steam-powered, coal-handling clamshell-bucket crane.

Through the turn of the century, Link-Belt expanded its line of steam-powered, heavy-duty coal-handling cranes. The line expanded into lighter, more versatile rail-based cranes.

=== Link-Belt moves to Chicago, expands into excavation ===
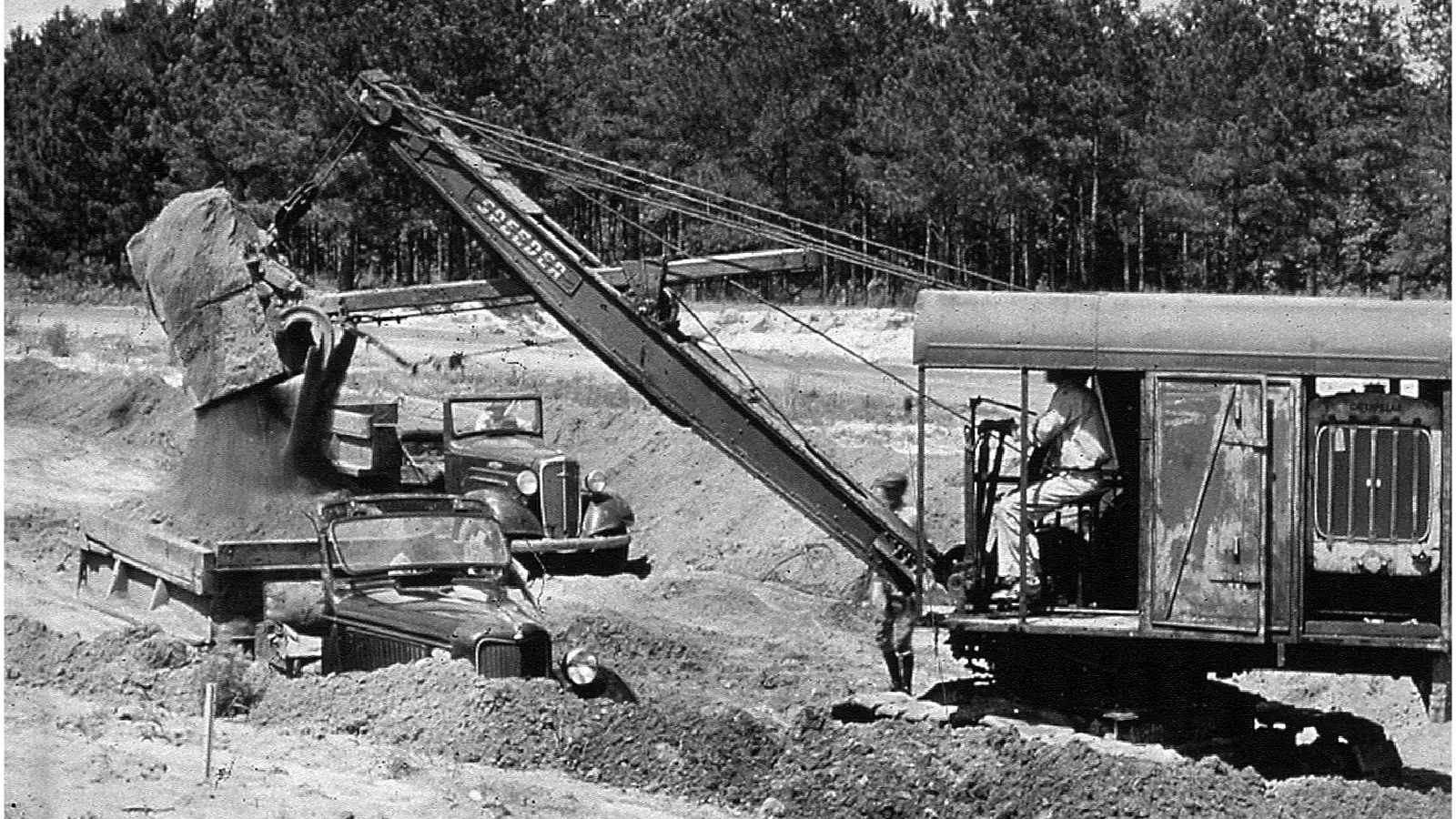
Link-Belt Crane Excavator, 1940

By the early 1900s, Link-Belt had moved well beyond its initial drive-chain origins. To support the growth, Link-Belt relocated from Iowa to Chicago in 1906. The two companies, Link-Belt Machinery and Link-Belt Engineering, consolidated into a single Link-Belt Company.

The 1900s also brought new technologies to Link-Belt cranes and excavators. Continuous-track crawler systems moved Link-Belt products off the railroad chassis, removing the need for temporary tracks. Dragline excavators expanded the power of crane-shovel systems. By 1922, Link-Belt expanded into this crawler-mounted crane-shovel excavator market, complementing its locomotive cranes and material handling equipment.

As the rail-based market shrank, Link-Belt's crawler-mounted line continued to grow. By the late 1930s, Link-Belt offered excavators ranging from a 3/4-yd to a 2-1/5-yd capacity.

=== Link-Belt Speeder and move to Cedar Rapids ===
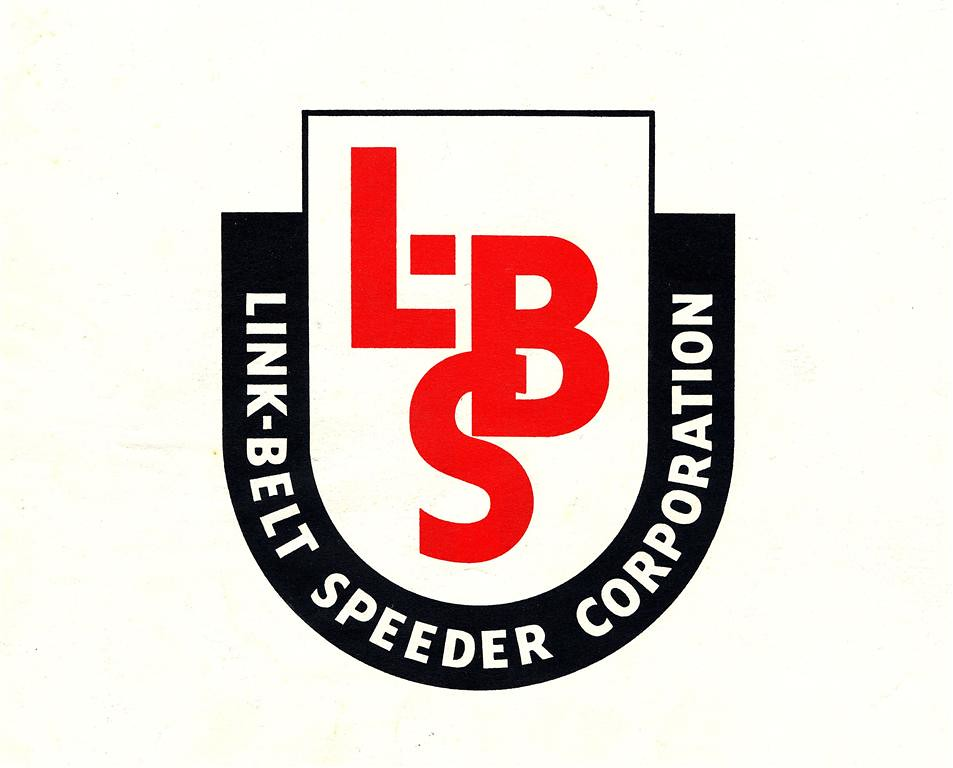
Link-Belt Speeder logo

In 1939, Link-Belt purchased Speeder Machinery and its line of smaller excavators. Merging Speeder with Link-Belt's Crane and Shovel Division expanded crane-shovel excavator line into the smaller capacity 3/8- to 3/4-yard range.

The acquisition also bought Link-Belt immediate entry into the wheel-mounted excavator market. Speeder had developed the world's first wheel-mounted excavator in 1922.

The merged companies formed the Link-Belt Speeder Corporation, a wholly owned subsidiary of Link-Belt Company. The company eventually relocated manufacturing to Cedar Rapids, Iowa.

=== Disruptive innovations: gasoline power and hydraulics ===
==== Industry analysis and disruptive innovation framework ====
From the post–World War II period through about 1970, Link-Belt became a notable case in business history for how established firms respond to major technological change. Harvard economist Clayton Christensen examined the mechanical excavator industry to explain why disruptive innovations often cause well-managed companies to fail, tracing how manufacturers adapted to shifts from steam to gasoline power and later to hydraulics.

Christensen identified gasoline power as a less disruptive transition. He listed Link-Belt among thirty-two steam shovel manufacturers operating in the early 1920s that had to redesign their machines. Steam shovels relied on steam pressure and multiple engines to control cable-driven buckets, while gasoline machines used a single engine and a new system of gears, clutches, drums, and brakes to perform the same functions.

Most large manufacturers successfully made this transition, leading Christensen to classify gasoline power as a sustaining innovation. Later changes—including the adoption of diesel engines, electric motors, and articulated-boom designs that improved reach, bucket size, and digging flexibility—were even less disruptive and were widely integrated by surviving firms.

==== Transition to hydraulics and competitive pressure ====
Clayton found Link-Belt was part of a more select group surviving the transition to hydraulics. After World War II, excavators moved from cable-actuated systems extending and lifting the bucket to hydraulic mechanisms, which were safer and simpler. Link-Belt was one of about 30 established cable-actuated excavator companies of the 1950s. By 1970, only four of these companies had survived by transitioning to hydraulics: Link-Belt, along with Insley, Koehring, and Little Giant.

Link-Belt faced strong new competition from hydraulic innovators, including Case, John Deere, Drott, Ford, Bamford (JCB), Poclain, International Harvester, Caterpillar, O & K, Demag, Liebherr, Komatsu, and Hitachi. A number of these entrants came to excavators through the invention of the backhoe. These small-capacity excavators initially mounted on the back of tractors, either farm or industrial varieties. This opened the excavator market to general contractors.

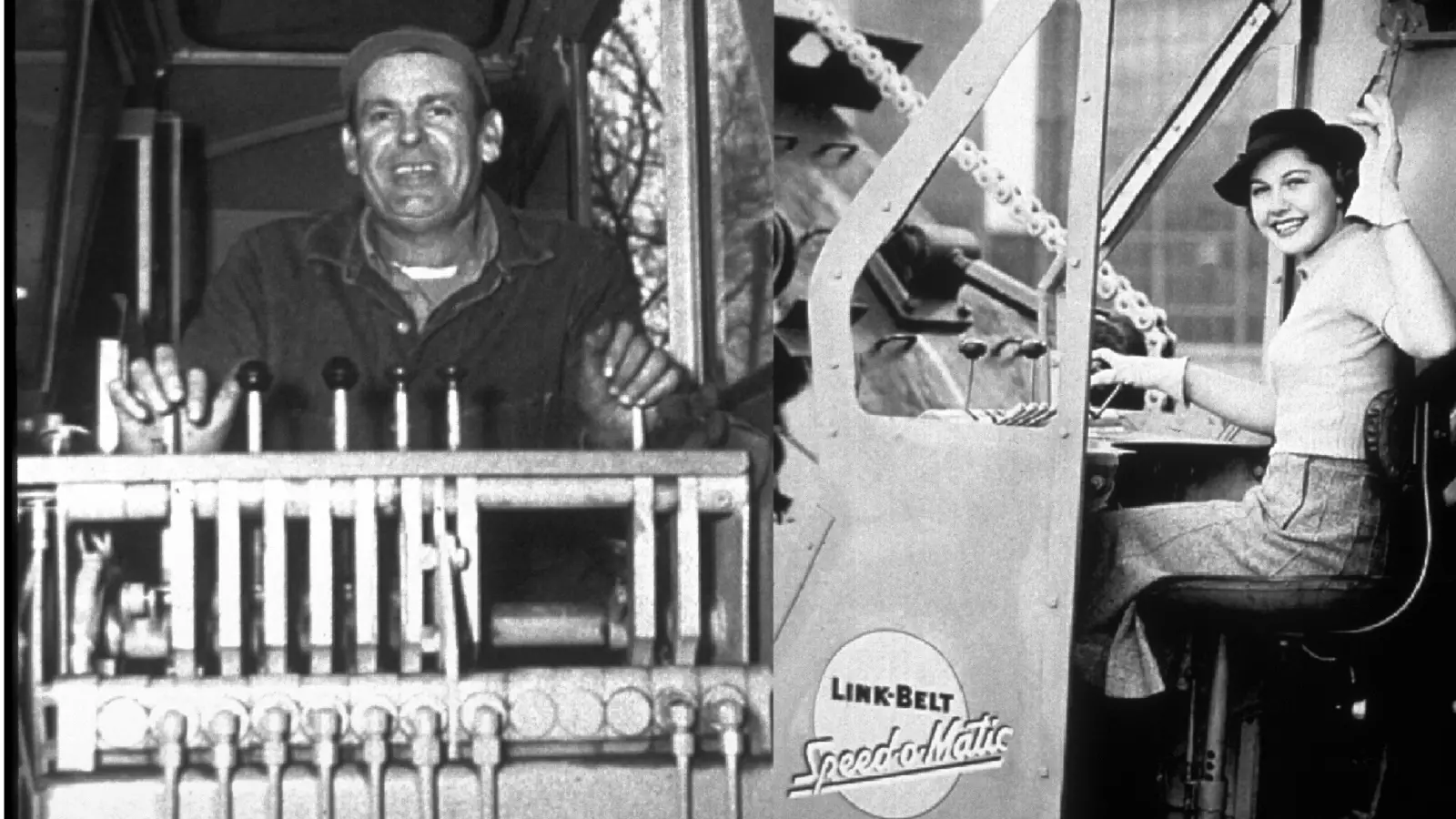
Marketing materials for Link-Belt Speed-O-Matic hydraulic controls

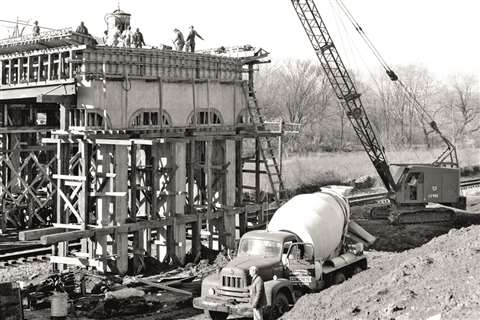
Link-Belt LS-98 crane. The LS-98 crane and crane-excavator continued in production for 42 years (1954 to 1996).

==== Link-Belt Speeder and hydraulic adoption ====
Link-Belt Speeder succeeded in competing against these new entrants, making it a showcase for managing disruptive innovation. The company adopted the new hydraulic technology quickly. Two years after the 1947 British invention of the backhoe, Link-Belt launched its full-function "Speed-O-Matic" hydraulic control system. It also launched new smaller-capacity excavators on both wheel-based chassis and crawlers.

This early adoption of hydraulics launched Link-Belt Speeder to the forefront of the worldwide crane-shovel market. This culminated in the 1954 flagship model LS-98 crane and crane-excavator, one of the most successful pieces of construction equipment ever built. Production of this model continued for over 42 years (1954 to 1996) with over 7,000 units being shipped. LS-98 units are still in operation around the world.

=== FMC Link-Belt and move to Lexington ===
In 1965, FMC Corporation purchased Link-Belt as a subsidiary. Link-Belt Speeder later became the Construction Equipment Group of FMC Corporation. It branded products with the FMC Link-Belt name, dropping Speeder.

FMC began an aggressive long-term capital expansion plan for manufacturing facilities and product lines. For example, FMC tried to leverage Link-Belt's expertise into its fire truck division. Working with Ladder Towers Inc. (LTI), FMC Link-Belt developed aerial ladder trucks. This venture was unsuccessful and shut down in 1990.

The expansion ended in the early 1980s during the early 1980s recession. FMC consolidated its Link-Belt operations to Lexington, Kentucky. This included the 1985 closure of the Cedar Rapids plant, which had 450 employees manufacturing excavators and both crawler and gantry cranes.

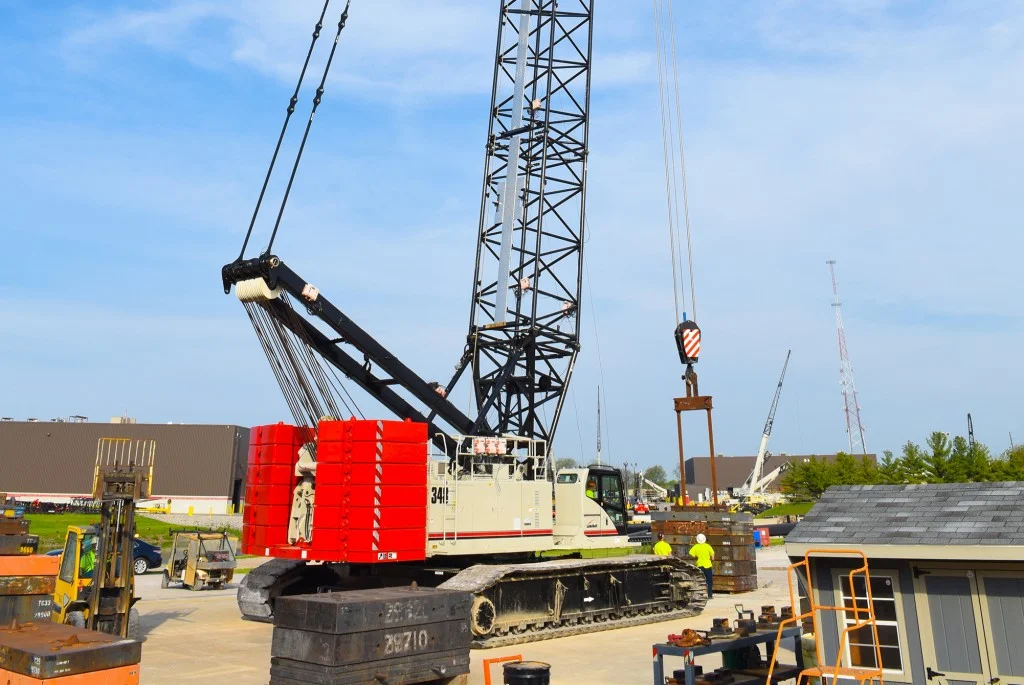
Link-Belt 300-ton crane

=== Sumitomo, Link-Belt Excavators and Link-Belt Cranes ===
Sumitomo Heavy Industries now owns the Link-Belt companies. Link-Belt Cranes operates separately from Link-Belt Excavators. Both are wholly owned subsidiaries based in Lexington, Kentucky. Sumitomo's involvement began when FMC and Sumitomo formed a 1986 joint venture named Link-Belt Construction Equipment Company.

The excavator/materials handling versus cranes separation occurred 1998. The FMC/Sumitomo joint venture (JV) spun off excavator products to a new JV with Case Corporation. The excavator JV became LBX, selling Link-Belt branded excavators.

=== Link-Belt cranes and excavators in North America ===
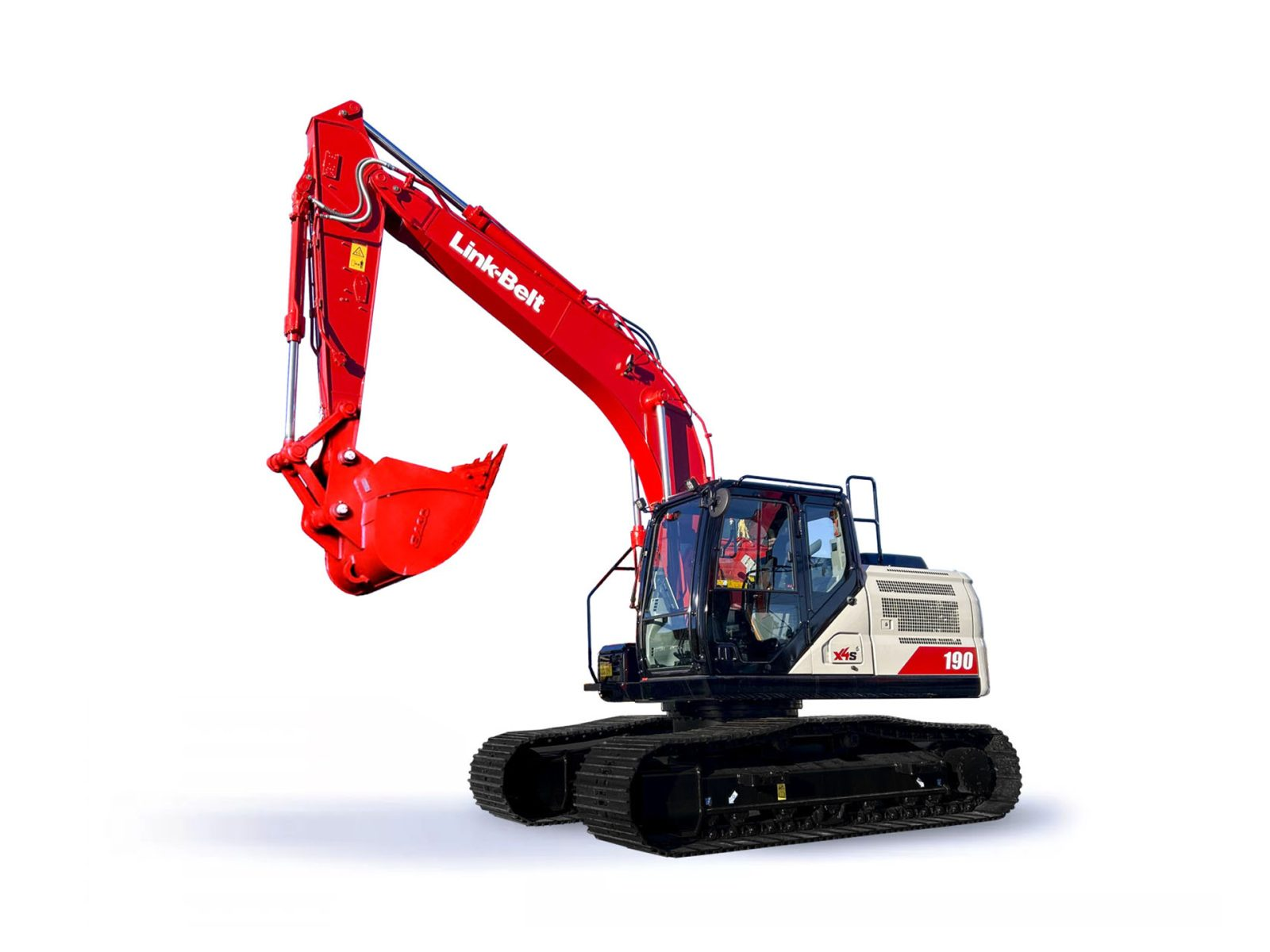
Link-Belt excavator

Today, Link-Belt sells its equipment worldwide through authorized distributors. These distributors handle sales, service, and technical support for the machines in their regions, while warranties are provided through the company.

Link-Belt is best known for its cranes, which remain a core part of its business. Its excavators, sold under the LBX brand, have also gained a stronger presence in North America, particularly in Canada and the United States.

Sumitomo Heavy Industries later acquired full ownership of both joint ventures and continues to operate Link-Belt Cranes separately from LBX Excavators.

==== Current products ====
Link-Belt Cranes currently produces a range of six crane categories (Rough Terrain, Telescopic Truck, Truck Terrain, All Terrain, Telescopic Crawler, and Lattice Crawler).

Current Link-Belt Crane Models
Rough Terrain	Telescopic Truck	Truck Terrain	All Terrain	Telescopic Crawler	Lattice Crawler
65|RT – 65T (65mt)	65|HT – 65T (55mt)	HTT-8675 Series II – 75T (70mt)	175|AT – 175T (150mt)	TCC-550 – 55T (50mt)	138 HSL – 80T (73mt)
75|RT – 75T (70mt)	HTC-8675 Series II – 75T (70mt)	HTT-86100 – 100T (85mt)	225|AT – 225T (200mt)	TCC-800 – 80T (75mt)	218 V – 110T (100mt)
100|RT – 100T (90mt)	HTC-86100 – 100T (85mt)	HTT-86110 – 110T (100mt)	300|AT – 300T (275mt)	TCC-1200 – 120T (110mt)	228 HSL – 130T (118mt)
120|RT – 120T (110mt)	HTC-86110 – 110T (100mt)	120|TT – 120T (110mt)		TCC-1400 – 140T (127mt)	238 HSL – 150T (136mt)
RTC-80130 Series II – 130T (120mt)	120|HT – 120T (110mt)	120|TT LB – 120T (110mt)		TCC-2500 – 250T (230mt)	248 HSL – 200T (181mt)
RTC-80160 Series II – 160T (145mt)	120|HT LB – 120T (110mt)				298 Series 2 – 250T (227mt)
					348 Series 2 – 300T (272mt)

==== Legacy products ====
Link-Belt was the last U.S. crane manufacturer to continue making lattice boom truck cranes. Its HC-238H II model, rated at 150 U.S. tons (137 metric tons), remained in production from 1999 to 2020. A larger version, the HC-278H II, was discontinued earlier.

The company also continued producing a small number of mechanical, or “friction,” cranes until 1997. Models such as the LS-98D and LS-108D were mainly used in dragline work, including excavation and dredging.

== Gallery ==
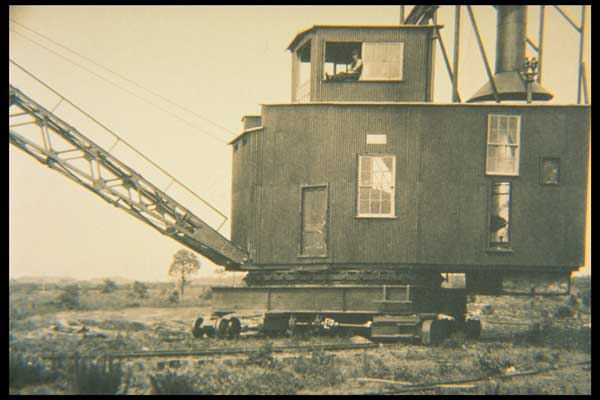
Link-Belt steam shovel crane circa 1890

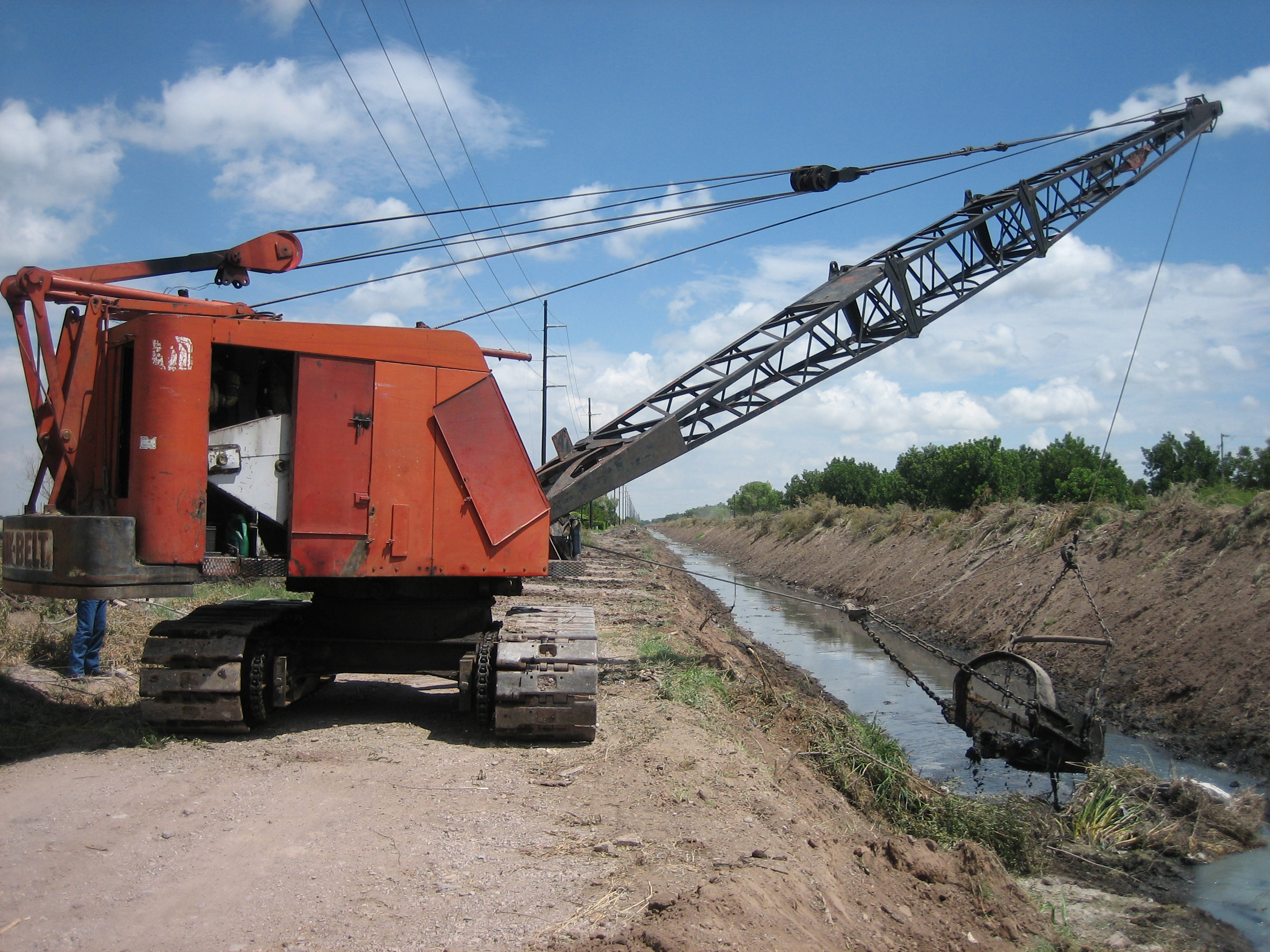
Vintage Link-Belt crawler crane in dragline configuration

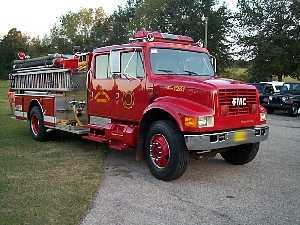
Chaires Engine 12-61 GMC FMC

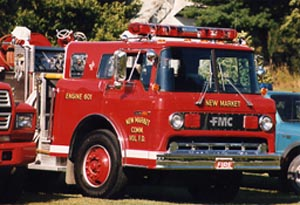
1991 Ford FMC

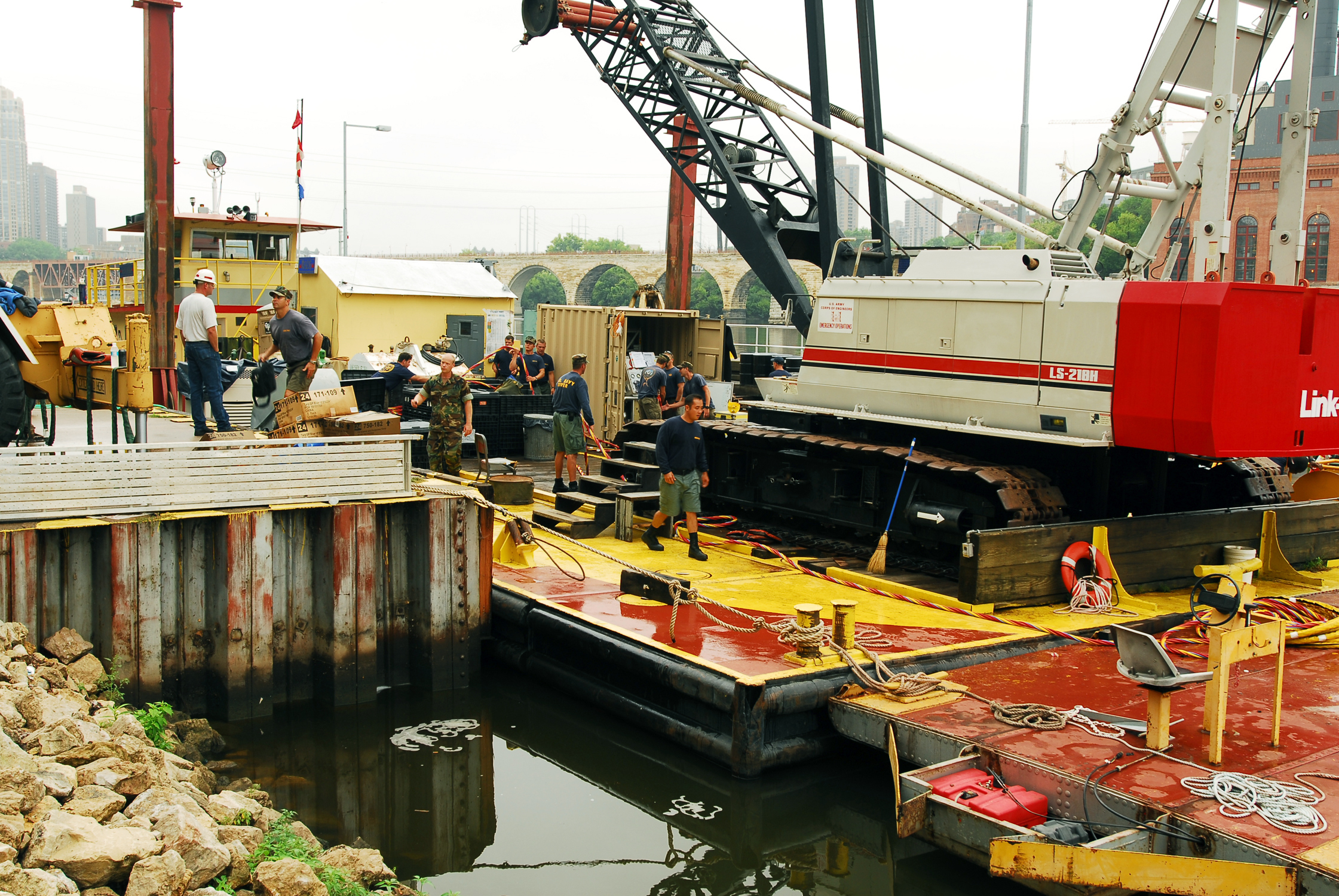
US Army Corps of Engineers Link-Belt crawler crane on US Navy docks

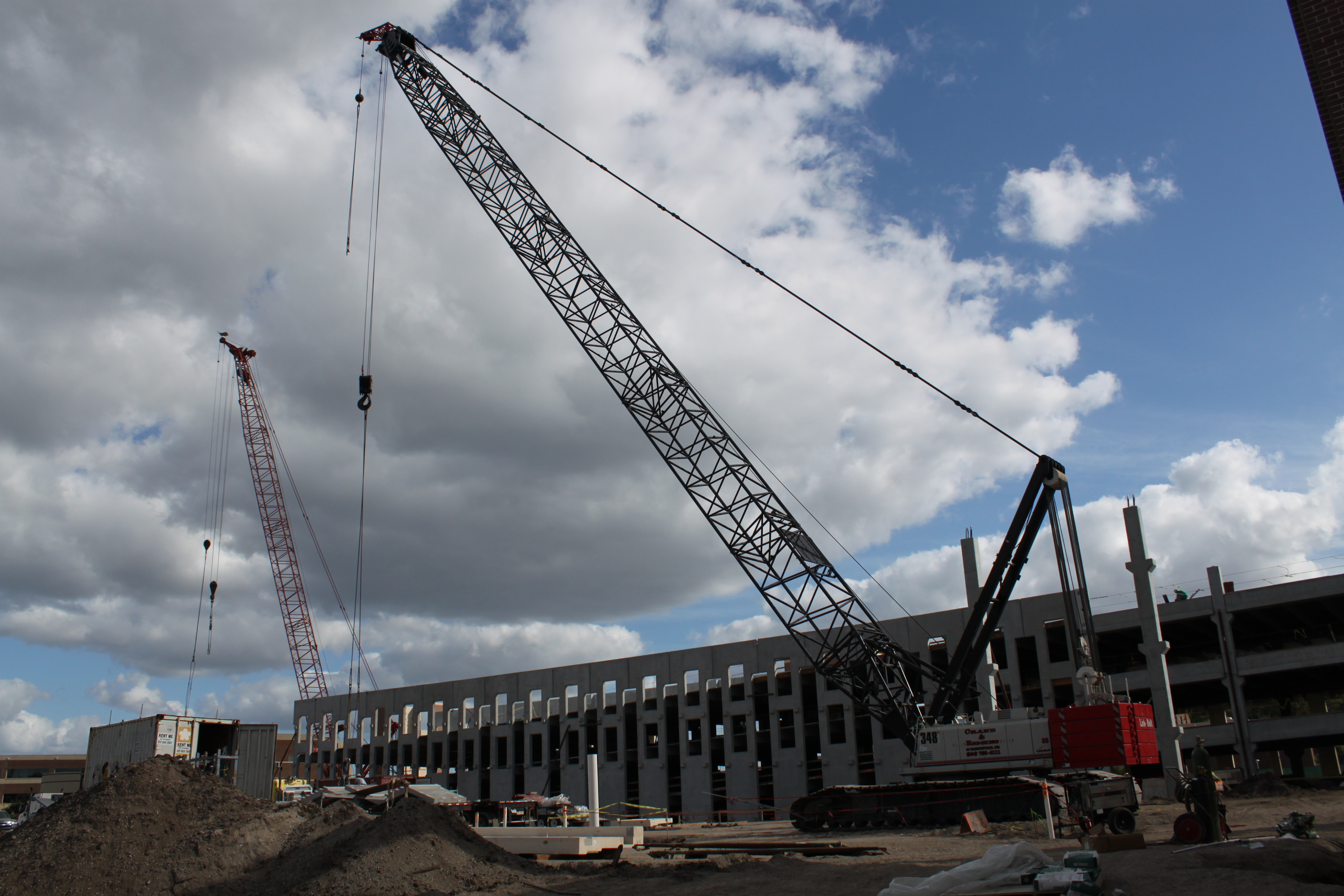
A Link-Belt 348 HYLAB 5 lattice crawler crane

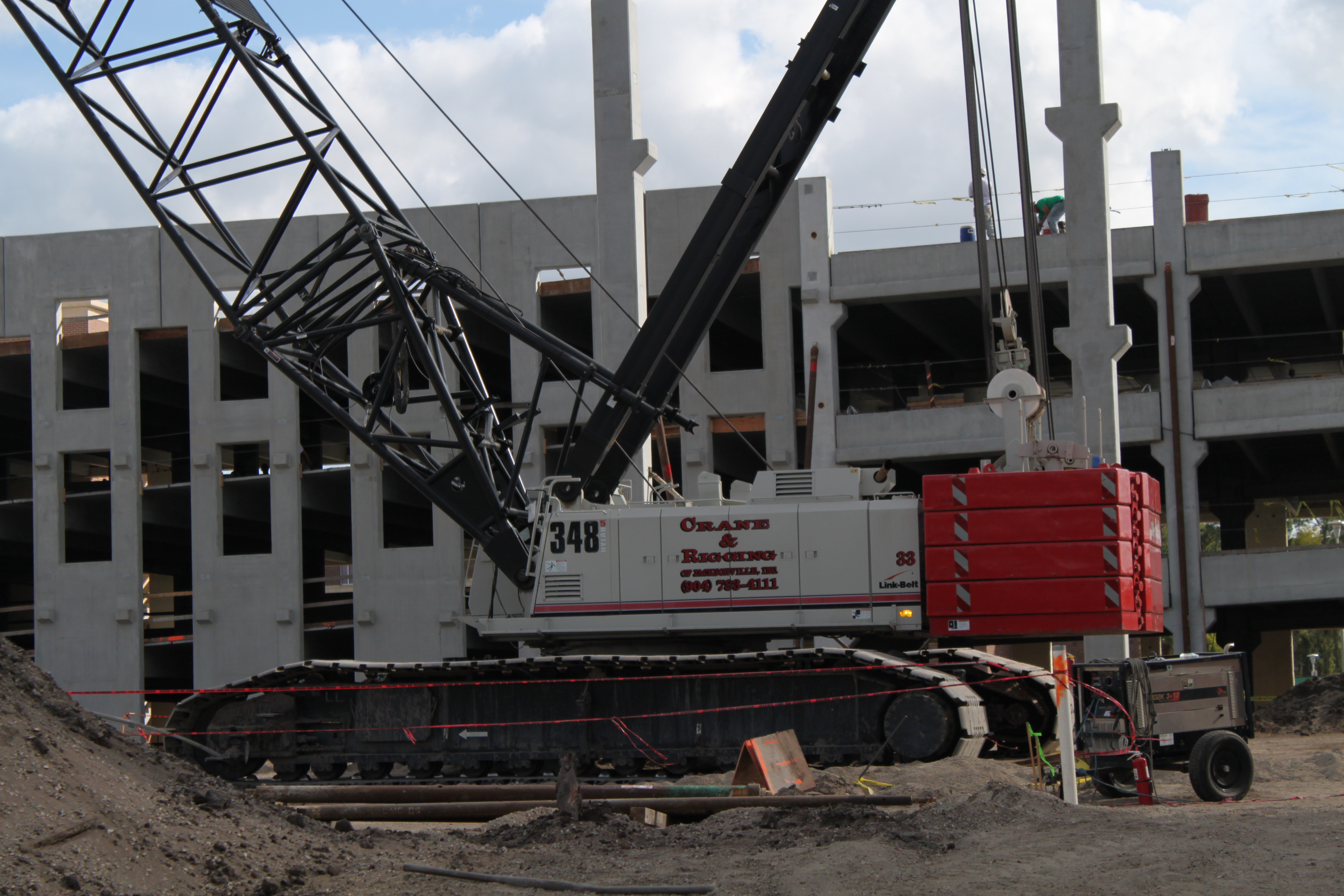
A Link-Belt 348 HYLAB 5 lattice crawler crane

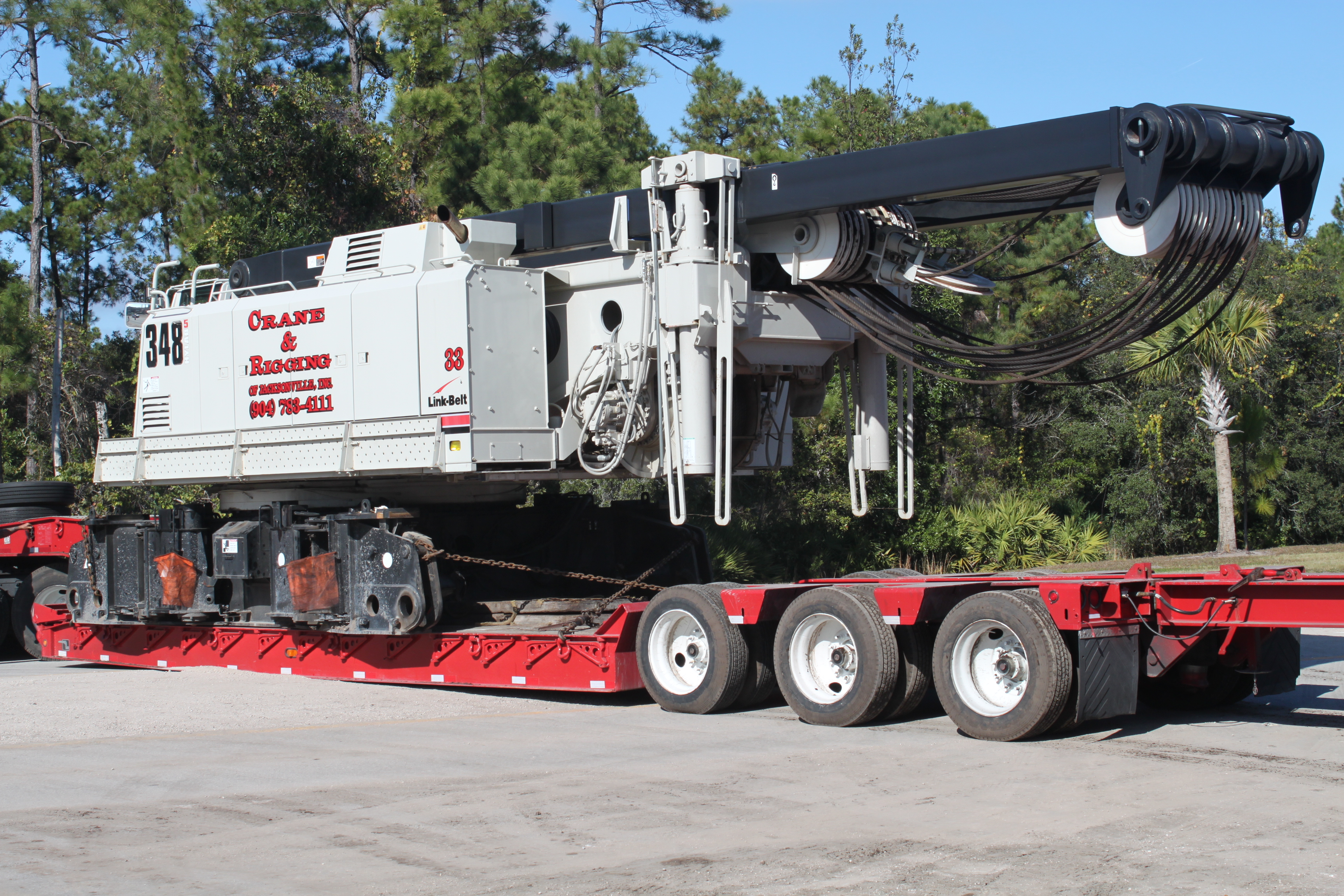
Base section of a Link-Belt 348 HYLAB 5 lattice crawler crane on a lowboy trailer

== See also ==
- Liebherr Group
- Manitowoc Cranes
- Tadano
- Terex
