= KTZT =

KTZT may refer to:

- KTZT-CD, a television station (channel 29) licensed to serve Tulsa, Oklahoma, United States
- Belle Plaine Municipal Airport in Belle Plaine, Iowa (ICAO code KTZT)
