= Iowa Highway 212 =

State highway in Iowa, United States

Iowa Highway 212
- Iowa 212 highlighted in red

Route information
- Maintained by Iowa DOT
- Length: 12.157 mi (19.565 km)

Major junctions
- West end: Iowa 21 near Belle Plaine
- East end: US 6 near Marengo

Location
- Country: United States
- State: Iowa
- Counties: Iowa

Highway system
- Iowa Primary Highway System; Interstate; US; State; Secondary; Scenic
← Iowa 210	→ US 218

Iowa Highway 212 is a state highway in Iowa County, Iowa. It runs 12 miles (19 km) from Iowa Highway 21 south of Belle Plaine to U.S. Highway 6 in Marengo. Iowa 212 was once a much longer highway, nearly 37 miles (60 km), covering parts of the Lincoln Highway.

== Route description ==
Iowa Highway 212 begins at an intersection with Iowa Highway 21 (Iowa 21) 4 miles (6.4 km) south of Belle Plaine. The intersection features a dominant curve from southbound Iowa 21 to eastbound Iowa 212. A short connector road allows westbound Iowa 212 traffic to reach southbound Iowa 21. Northbound Iowa 21 traffic must stop at the curve in order to continue north on Iowa 21.

Heading east, Iowa 212 runs roughly parallel to the Iowa River for its entire length. It crosses Bear Creek before entering Marengo along South Street. At Western Avenue, Iowa 212 turns south towards U.S. Highway 6. Just 1/5 mile (0.32 km) from its eastern end, Iowa 212 crosses a single line of the Iowa Interstate Railroad. The route ends at US 6 on the southwestern edge of Marengo.

== History ==
The route which is now Iowa 212 was originally designated as Primary Road No. 73 (PR No. 73) in 1920. PR No. 73 was a 16-mile-long (26 km) route which began at the Lincoln Highway (PR No. 6) in Belle Plaine and ended at the River to River Road (PR No. 7) in Marengo. By 1947, Iowa 73 had been renumbered Iowa 212. The Lincoln Highway, now U.S. Highway 30 (US 30), had been relocated north of Belle Plaine. Iowa 212 was extended west through Chelsea along the western leg of the abandoned section of US 30. In 1980, the Lincoln Highway section of Iowa 212 was turned over to Tama County and became County Road E66. Iowa 212 was truncated at its intersection with Iowa 21.

== Major intersections ==
The entire route is in Iowa County.

Location	mi	km	Destinations	Notes
Honey Creek Township	0.000	0.000	Iowa 21 – Belle Plaine, Victor	Dominant curve from southbound Iowa 21
Marengo	12.157	19.565	US 6 – Brooklyn, Coralville	
1.000 mi = 1.609 km; 1.000 km = 0.621 mi
