= Charles Piez =

American engineer (1866–1933)

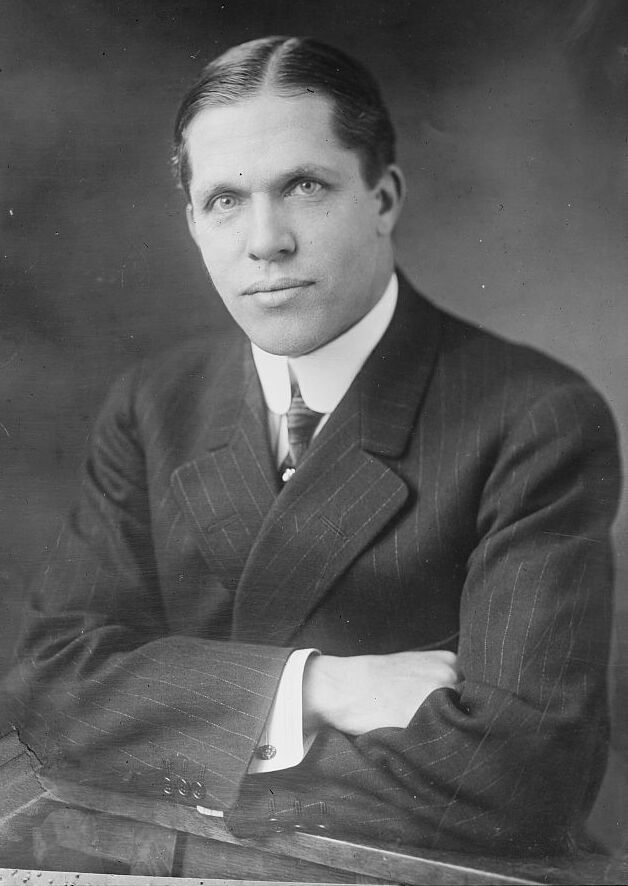
- Piez, c. 1915

President of the American Society of Mechanical Engineers
- In office 1930–1931

Personal details
- Born: September 24, 1866 Mainz, Germany
- Died: October 2, 1933 (aged 67) Washington, D.C., U.S.
- Resting place: Oak Hill Cemetery

Charles Piez (September 24, 1866 - October 2, 1933) was an American mechanical engineer, manufacturer, and president of the Link-Belt Co. He was president of the Electric Company, and vice president and general manager of the Emergency Fleet Corporation (EFC). He is also known as president of the American Society of Mechanical Engineers from 1930 to 1931.

== Biography ==
Piez was born in Mainz, Grand Duchy of Hesse, the son of Jacob Piez and Katherine (Liebig) Piez, both naturalized American citizens. He emigrated with his parents to the United States, and attended public schools in Manhattan, New York City. He entered the School of Mines of Columbia University in the class of 1888. Due to financial reverses in the family he worked for a year, and graduated with the class of 1889.

After graduation Piez started his career in industry as an engineer draftsman at the Link-Belt Engineering Corporation in Philadelphia under James Mapes Dodge. He worked his way up to chief engineer, general manager, and eventually vice-president until 1906.

In 1906, the Link-Belt Engineering Corporation merged into the Link-Belt Co., and Piez was elected president. Piez held the position of president until 1917. After the outbreak of World War I, Piez was appointed vice-president of the Emergency Fleet Corporation (EFC). He represented the EFC on the priorities board of the War Industries Board. In 1917, he was also appointed manager of the United States Shipping Board, succeeding Rear-Admiral Frederic R. Harris. In 1919, Piez forbade the Seattle ship manufacturers from meeting workers demands, triggering the Seattle General Strike. Piez was singled out as a prime target of the strike. The action was unsuccessful. Until his retirement in April 1933, Piez served as chairman of the board of the Link-Belt Corporation.

From 1925 to 1927, Piez served as president of the Illinois Manufacturers' Association. From 1930 to 1931, he served as president of the American Society of Mechanical Engineers.

He died on October 2, 1933, in Washington, D.C. He was buried in Oak Hill Cemetery.

== Selected publications ==
- Charles Piez. Personal reminiscences of James Mapes Dodge, 1916
