= Drott Manufacturing Company =

Construction equipment manufacturers of the United States

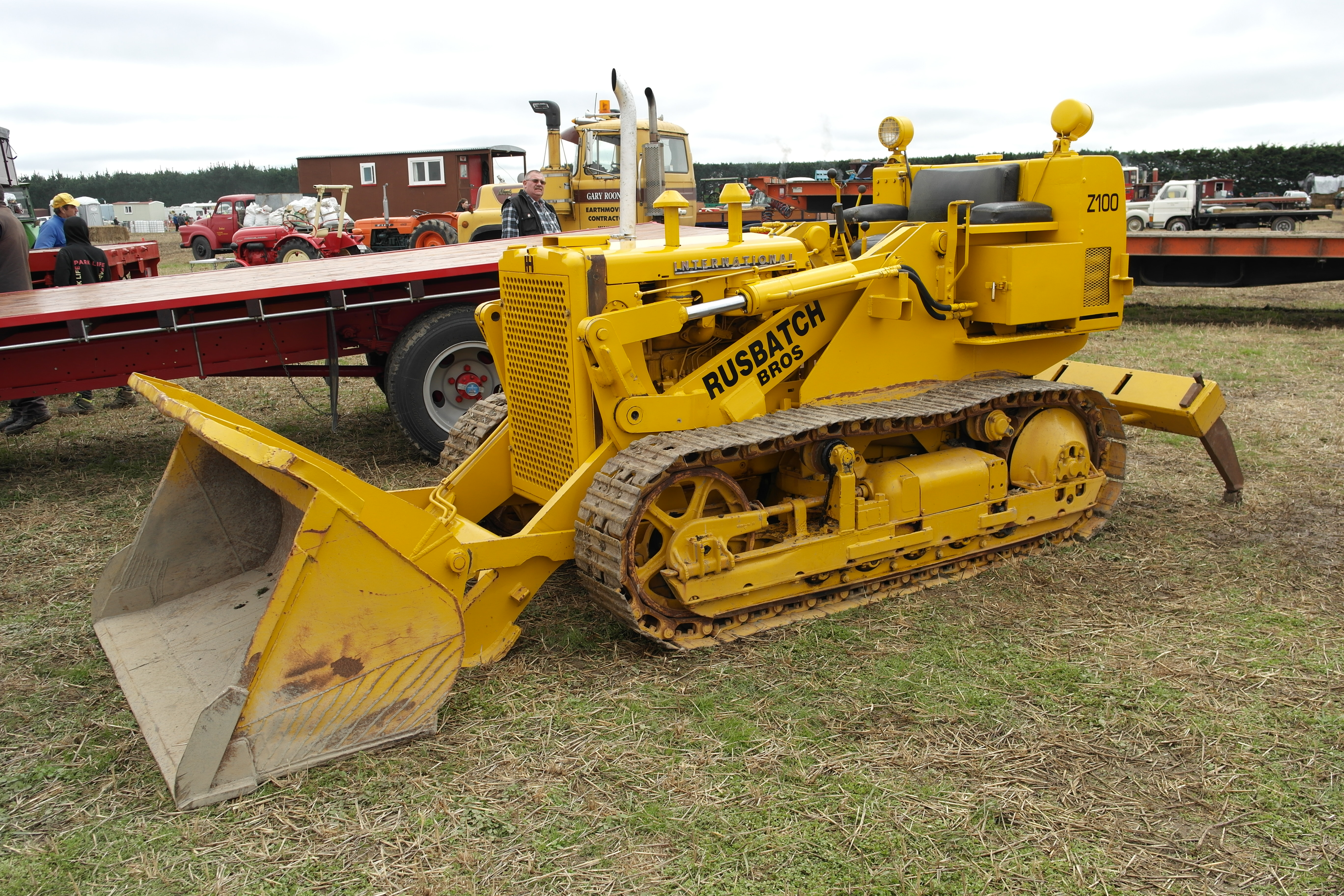
International tractor with Drott bucket

The Drott Manufacturing Company was a manufacturer of heavy equipment buckets. The company existed from 1916 until 1968.

== History ==
The company founded (as the Drott Tractor Company) by Edward Drott in 1916. The company was based in Butternut, Wisconsin before moving to Wausau, Wisconsin. In 1923, after several re-organizations, it became the Drott Manufacturing Company. Drott was taken over by Tenneco in 1968 and became a division of Case Corporation which was owned by Tenneco.

== Drott Buckets ==
Drott developed buckets for other manufacturer's construction bulldozers, including one of the first of its type for Caterpillar in 1930. The bucket held roughly 1 cubic yard of soil. The company's best-known product was the Drott 4 in 1 bucket. This was a tractor attachment with four functions: dozer, clamshell, bucket and scraper. The "International Drott" was an International Harvester tractor fitted with Drott equipment. In 1950, International signed an agreement with Drott to produce the machines under the name "International-Drott."

== United Kingdom ==
The Drott 4 in 1 bucket was manufactured in the UK by Rubery Owen and tractors fitted with this equipment became known as "Drotts".
