= Poclain =

French excavator manufacturer

Poclain is a French agricultural machinery company. It was founded by the engineer Georges Bataille (not to be confused with the writer Georges Bataille) in France in 1927, then developed by his sons Pierre and Claude Bataille, with help from Jacques and Bernard Bataille. It was originally called Ateliers de Poclain and operated out of Le Plessis-Belleville.

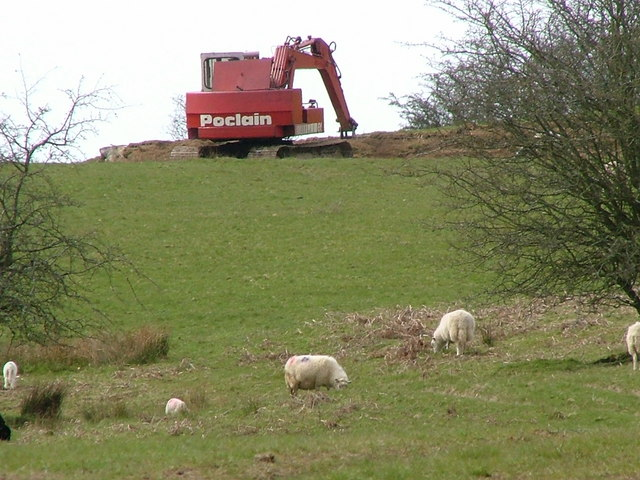
Tracked Poclain excavator

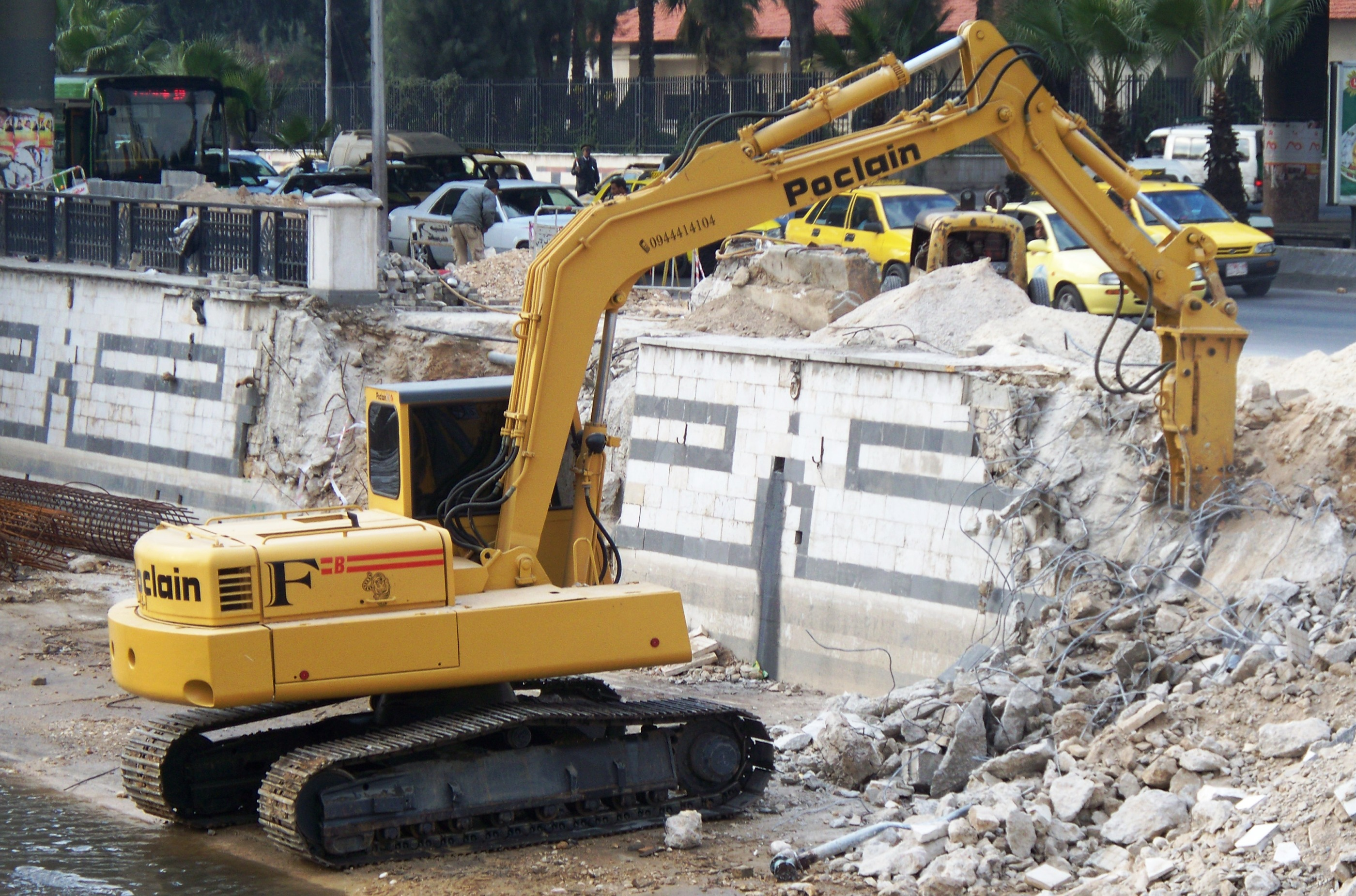
Tracked Poclain excavator

Poclain produced excavators, and was a leader on the French and world market thanks to a revolutionary hydraulic motor. The Batailles were forced to sell the company to Case in 1974, an American company, which then took over completely in 1987, leaving them (the Batailles) only the hydraulics division, which is still trading today.

Poclain makes radial piston hydraulic motors, which are mostly used in industrial and off highway vehicles.

== History ==
The company started in the excavator business in 1948 in France, when they built a loader unit on a Dodge 4x4 chassis, followed by a hydraulic excavator, the TU, in 1951. This was built on a two-wheeled trailer and powered from the towing tractor. Over 1000 were sold before a new design was introduced in 1956, the TO. By 1961 they had sold over 400 units, and moved into the German market, the TY and TYA being introduced that year. The German firm O&K also introduced the RH5, their first hydraulic machine, in 1961.

The TY45, a revolutionary design, was also introduced in 1961. This machine featured a full 360 deg rotating excavator on a three-wheeled tricycle undercarriage. Over the next 21 years of production 30,000 were built.

Company president Pierre Bataille led an early diversification with a move into mobile cranes with the creation of PPM in 1965, and later into hydraulic components. Diversification also led to international marketing agreements; with Poclain machines were being manufactured in Argentina, Czechoslovakia, India, Japan, and Korea. At this time, manufacturing subsidiaries were also set up in Brazil and Mexico.

In 1975 an agreement between Poclain and Volvo initiated production in France and Germany while Volvo would distribute Poclain products in Scandinavia and Austria.

In the 1970s they expanded rapidly, taking over various supplier companies to gain control of supply, but a recession obliged them to sell 40% to Case of America in 1977 who were looking to expand their construction equipment division (CE). Case assumed responsibility for distribution of Poclain products in the USA and Canada. In 1980 production of Poclain machines began in America. By 1987 Case had 98.7% control, leaving the family with the hydraulics company.
