= Belle Plaine, Iowa =

- City
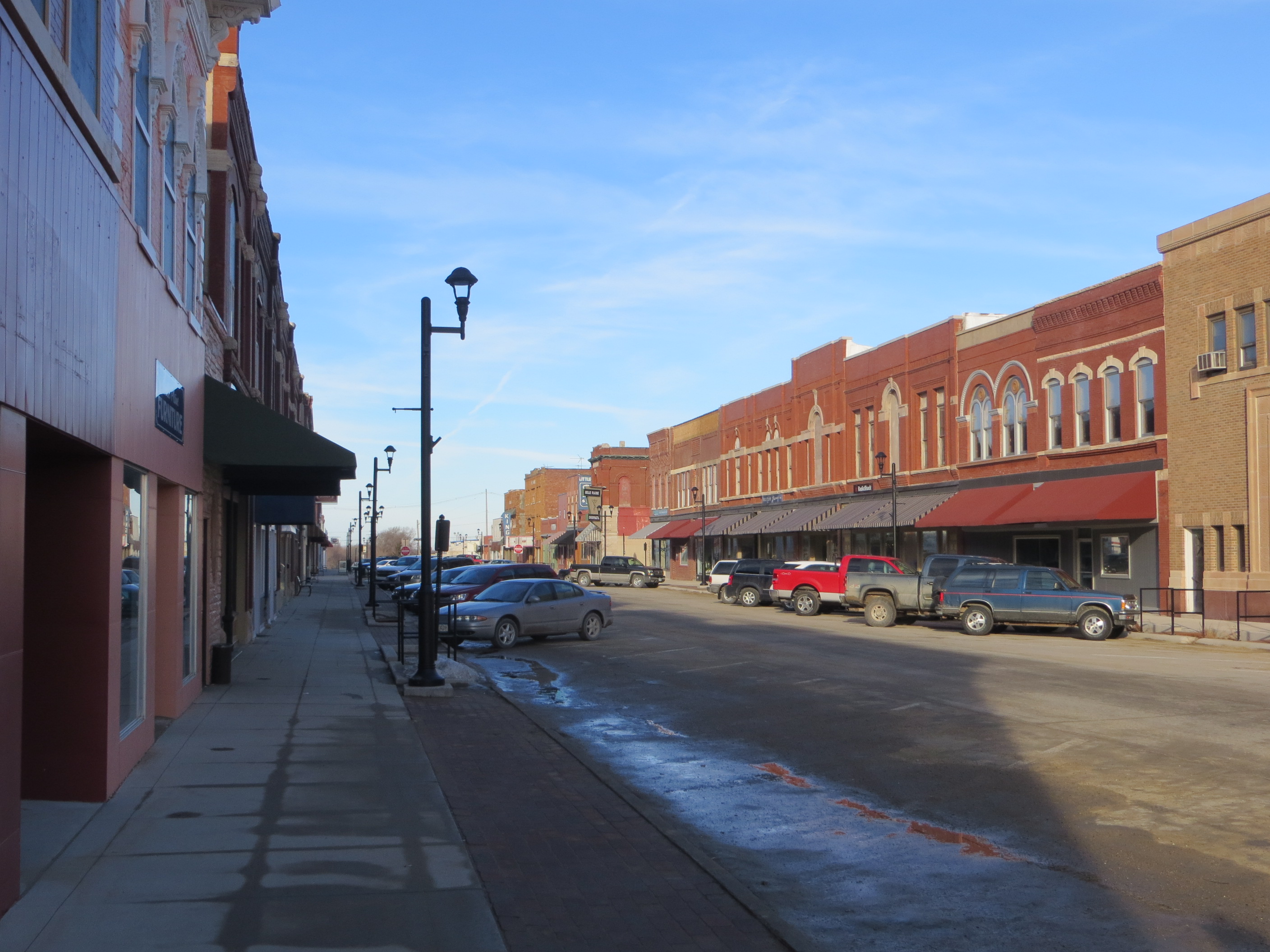
- Downtown Belle Plaine

- Location of Belle Plaine, Iowa
- Coordinates: 41°53′48″N 92°16′39″W
- Country: United States
- State: Iowa
- County: Benton

Area
  - Total: 3.19 sq mi (8.27 km^{2})
  - Land: 3.18 sq mi (8.23 km^{2})
  - Water: 0.015 sq mi (0.04 km^{2})
- Elevation: 827 ft (252 m)

Population (2020)
  - Total: 2,330
  - Density: 730/sq mi (283/km^{2})
- Time zone: UTC-6 (Central (CST))
  - Summer (DST): UTC-5 (CDT)
- ZIP Code: 52208
- Area code: 319
- FIPS code: 19-05590
- GNIS feature ID: 0454495
- Website: belleplaineiowa.gov

Belle Plaine is a city in Benton County, Iowa, United States. The population was 2,330 at the 2020 census. It is part of the Cedar Rapids metropolitan area.

== History ==
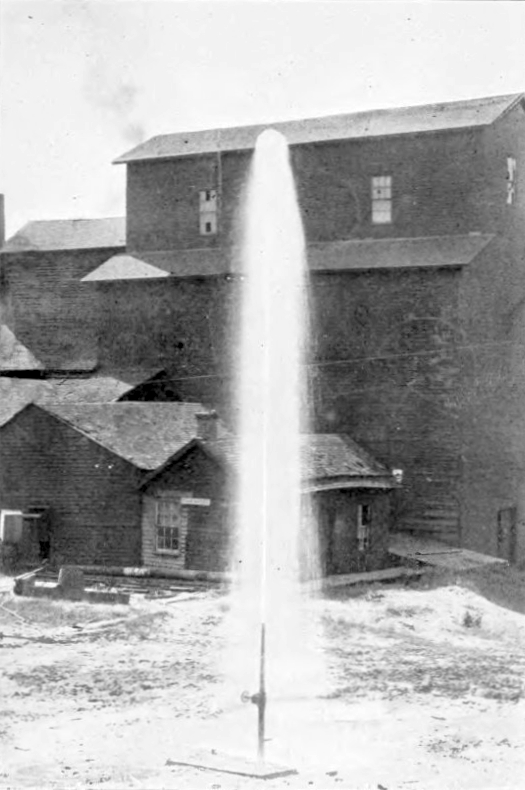
An artesian well at Belle Plaine, 1903

Belle Plaine was founded in 1862 when it was certain the railroad would be extended to that point. It was surveyed in March 1862 by George F. Kirby for its proprietor, John I Blair who platted it and filed the plat for record on 12 May 1862. (The date and surveyor were identical for Blairstown.) "Belle Plaine" is derived from the French meaning "beautiful plain".

Belle Plaine is located on both the historic Lincoln Highway and the cross country tracks of the Union Pacific Railroad.

== Geography ==
According to the United States Census Bureau, the city has a total area of 3.23 square miles (8.37 km^{2}), of which 3.22 square miles (8.34 km^{2}) is land and 0.01 square miles (0.03 km^{2}) is water.

The Iowa River flows roughly southeastward, just south of the city airport.

=== Climate ===
Climate data for Belle Plaine, Iowa (1991–2020)
Month	Jan	Feb	Mar	Apr	May	Jun	Jul	Aug	Sep	Oct	Nov	Dec	Year
Mean daily maximum °F (°C)	28.1 (−2.2)	32.8 (0.4)	46.0 (7.8)	60.0 (15.6)	70.9 (21.6)	80.3 (26.8)	83.6 (28.7)	82.1 (27.8)	75.8 (24.3)	62.9 (17.2)	47.2 (8.4)	33.6 (0.9)	58.6 (14.8)
Daily mean °F (°C)	19.3 (−7.1)	23.5 (−4.7)	35.9 (2.2)	48.6 (9.2)	60.1 (15.6)	70.0 (21.1)	73.3 (22.9)	71.1 (21.7)	63.5 (17.5)	51.0 (10.6)	37.2 (2.9)	25.2 (−3.8)	48.2 (9.0)
Mean daily minimum °F (°C)	10.4 (−12.0)	14.3 (−9.8)	25.8 (−3.4)	37.1 (2.8)	49.2 (9.6)	59.7 (15.4)	62.9 (17.2)	60.2 (15.7)	51.1 (10.6)	39.0 (3.9)	27.1 (−2.7)	16.8 (−8.4)	37.8 (3.2)
Average precipitation inches (mm)	1.11 (28)	1.28 (33)	2.03 (52)	3.68 (93)	4.43 (113)	5.23 (133)	4.06 (103)	4.08 (104)	3.55 (90)	2.86 (73)	2.11 (54)	1.58 (40)	36 (916)
Average snowfall inches (cm)	7.8 (20)	7.4 (19)	3.4 (8.6)	0.8 (2.0)	0.0 (0.0)	0.0 (0.0)	0.0 (0.0)	0.0 (0.0)	0.0 (0.0)	0.4 (1.0)	1.8 (4.6)	6.3 (16)	27.9 (71.2)
Source: NOAA

== Demographics ==
Historical populations
Year	Pop.	±%
1870	1,488	—
1880	1,689	+13.5%
1890	2,623	+55.3%
1900	3,283	+25.2%
1910	3,121	−4.9%
1920	3,887	+24.5%
1930	3,239	−16.7%
1940	3,202	−1.1%
1950	3,056	−4.6%
1960	2,923	−4.4%
1970	2,810	−3.9%
1980	2,903	+3.3%
1990	2,834	−2.4%
2000	2,878	+1.6%
2010	2,534	−12.0%
2020	2,330	−8.1%
Source:"U.S. Census website". United States Census Bureau. and Iowa Data Center; Source: U.S. Decennial Census

=== 2020 census ===
As of the 2020 census, Belle Plaine had a population of 2,330, with 1,058 households and 589 families. The population density was 733.0 inhabitants per square mile (283.0/km^{2}). There were 1,222 housing units at an average density of 384.4 per square mile (148.4/km^{2}). For every 100 females there were 101.9 males, and for every 100 females age 18 and over there were 97.9 males age 18 and over.

The median age was 44.4 years. 21.8% of residents were under the age of 18, 24.4% were under the age of 20, 4.1% were between the ages of 20 and 24, 21.8% were from 25 to 44, 28.8% were from 45 to 64, and 20.8% were 65 years of age or older. The gender makeup of the city was 50.5% male and 49.5% female.

Of households, 23.9% had children under the age of 18 living in them. Of all households, 40.5% were married-couple households, 8.4% were cohabitating couples, 23.4% were households with a male householder and no spouse or partner present, and 27.7% were households with a female householder and no spouse or partner present. About 44.3% of households were non-families, 37.7% of all households were made up of individuals, and 17.8% had someone living alone who was 65 years of age or older.

Of all housing units, 13.4% were vacant. The homeowner vacancy rate was 2.9% and the rental vacancy rate was 17.6%.

0.0% of residents lived in urban areas, while 100.0% lived in rural areas.

Racial composition as of the 2020 census
Race	Number	Percent
White	2,188	93.9%
Black or African American	13	0.6%
American Indian and Alaska Native	0	0.0%
Asian	15	0.6%
Native Hawaiian and Other Pacific Islander	0	0.0%
Some other race	12	0.5%
Two or more races	102	4.4%
Hispanic or Latino (of any race)	46	2.0%

=== 2010 census ===
As of the census of 2010, there were 2,534 people, 1,101 households, and 659 families living in the city. The population density was 787.0 inhabitants per square mile (303.9/km^{2}). There were 1,258 housing units at an average density of 390.7 per square mile (150.9/km^{2}). The racial makeup of the city was 97.8% White, 0.3% African American, 0.4% Asian, 0.7% from other races, and 0.8% from two or more races. Hispanic or Latino of any race were 1.7% of the population.

There were 1,101 households, of which 27.2% had children under the age of 18 living with them, 45.9% were married couples living together, 10% had a female householder with no husband present, 4.0% had a male householder with no wife present, and 40.1% were non-families. 34.5% of all households were made up of individuals, and 16.1% had someone living alone who was 65 years of age or older. The average household size was 2.26 and the average family size was 2.9.

The median age in the city was 42.8 years. 23.5% of residents were under the age of 18; 7% were between the ages of 18 and 24; 22.5% were from 25 to 44; 28.2% were from 45 to 64; and 19.1% were 65 years of age or older. The gender makeup of the city was 48.9% male and 51.1% female.

=== 2000 census ===
As of the census of 2000, there were 2,878 people, 1,212 households and 749 families living in the city. The population density was 890.6 inhabitants per square mile (343.9/km^{2}). There were 1,318 housing units at an average density of 407.9 per square mile (157.5/km^{2}). The racial makeup of the city was 98.92% White, 0.07% African American, 0.03% Native American, 0.17% Asian, 0.1% Pacific Islander, 0.07% from other races, and 0.63% from two or more races. Hispanic or Latino of any race were 0.66% of the population.

There were 1,212 households, out of which 29.9% had children under the age of 18 living with them, 49.5% were married couples living together, 8% had a female householder with no husband present, and 38.2% were non-families. 33.9% of all households were made up of individuals, and 20.6% had someone living alone who was 65 years of age or older. The average household size was 2.32 and the average family size was 2.97.

25.7% are under the age of 18, 7.2% from 18 to 24, 26.6% from 25 to 44, 19.6% from 45 to 64, and 20.8% who were 65 years of age or older. The median age was 39 years. For every 100 females, there were 95.3 males. For every 100 females age 18 and over, there were 86.3 males.

The median income for a household in the city was $36,316, and the median income for a family was $47,105. Males had a median income of $31,750 versus $24,966 for females. The per capita income for the city was $16,321. About 3.3% of families and 7% of the population were below the poverty line, including 5.3% of those under age 18 and 10.6% of those age 65 or over.

== Government ==
The current mayor of Belle Plaine is Lyle Morrow.

== Education ==
The Belle Plaine Community School District provides education services to the Belle Plaine area. The district is one of three school districts serving Benton County. Belle Plaine High School and the junior high school are co-located. Longfellow Elementary school provides pre-K through 6th grade education.

== Infrastructure ==
Iowa Highway 21 passes through Belle Plaine providing north to south travel from Waterloo to Hedrick and connections with both state and US east to west highways, U.S. Highway 30 north of town and Iowa Highway 212 south of town.

The railroad provides east to west freight service to the city.

The city airport is located on the south side of the town.

== Notable people ==
- George Alexander, 28th Mayor of Los Angeles; lived in Belle Plaine for several years.
- Marjorie Cameron, artist, occultist, actress, and wife of rocket pioneer and occultist Jack Parsons.
- Steve Carl, mixed martial artist.
- William Dana Ewart, invented and patented the linked belt.
- Tom McLaury, outlaw cowboy; grew up in Belle Plaine.
- Earl Moran, 20th century pin-up and glamour artist was born in Belle Plaine in 1893.
- Hap Moran, New York Giants football star, was born in Belle Plaine in 1901.
- Lonnie Nielsen, professional golfer, was born in Belle Plaine in 1953.
- Rod Rust, former New England Patriots Head Coach; coached Belle Plaine High School in 1954–1955
- Henry B. Tippie (1927–2022), businessman in the NYSE Hall of Fame, was born Belle Plaine
- Frank Wearne, raced seven times in the Indianapolis 500
