= Grab (tool) =

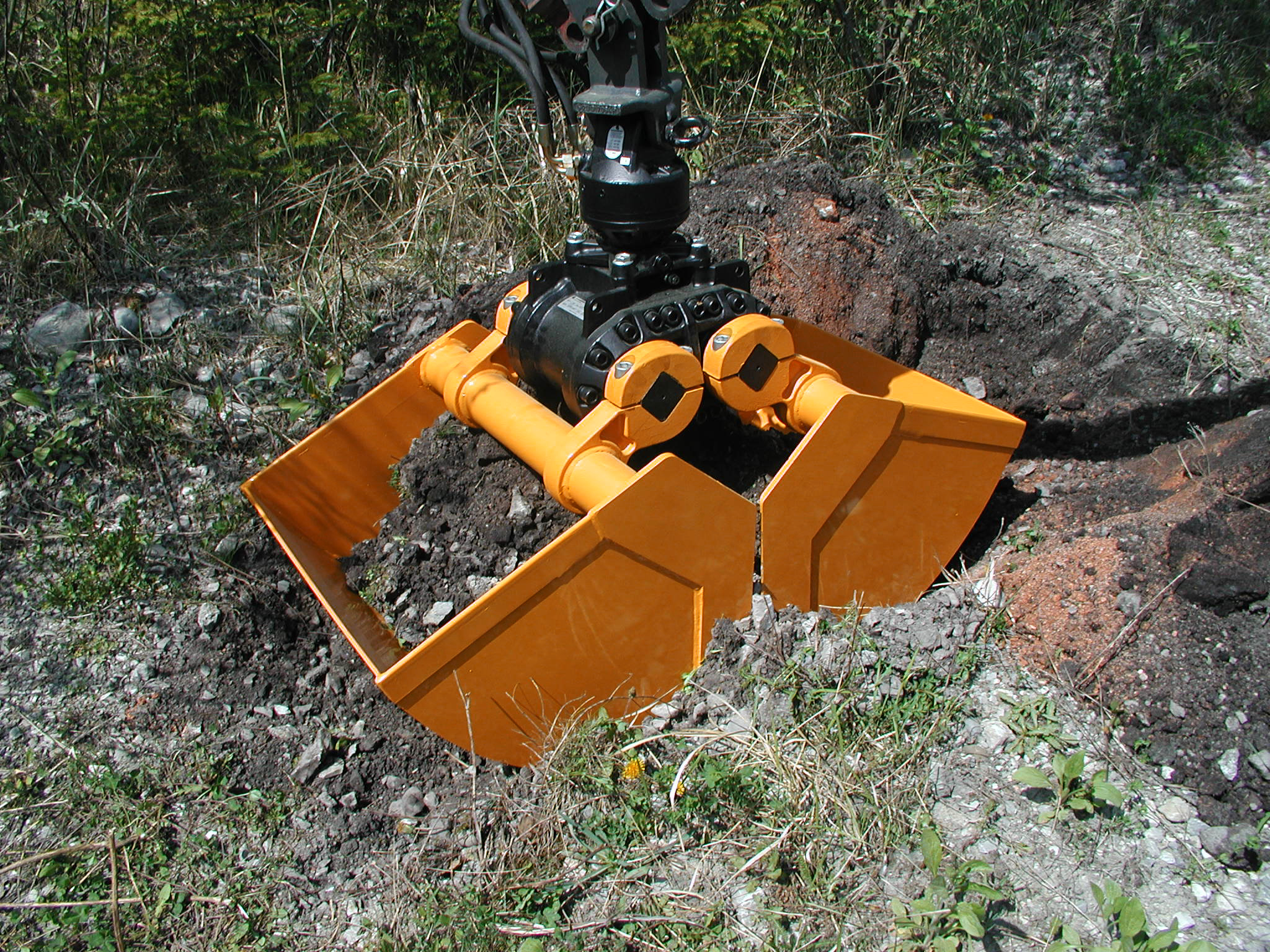
A clamshell bucket

A grab or mechanical grab is a mechanical device with two or more jaws (sometime clamshell-shaped), used to pick things up or to capture things. Some types include:

- Roundnose grab
- Clamshell grab
- Orange-peel grab
  - in Dutch and German they are called poliep grijpers/ Polypengreifer = "polyp grabs".

There are different ways of open/close the grabs:

- electro-hydraulic / diesel-hydraulic
- mechanical by rope(s) (1-rope, 2-ropes, 3-ropes, 4-ropes)

Grabs can be used for:

- dredging
- bulk handling (e.g. loading/unloading ships)
- salvage (e.g. ship-wrecks, oil)
- seabed sampling

== History ==
The mechanical grab, specifically the clamshell grab, was invented by the Persian Banu Musa brothers and described in their Book of Ingenious Devices in the 9th century. It was an original innovation by the Banu Musa that does not appear in any earlier Greek works. The grab described by the Banu Musa was used to extract objects from underwater, and recover objects from the beds of streams.

== See also ==
- Bucket (machine part)
