= Rock Island Depot =

Rock Island Depot (or variations such as Rock Island Passenger Station) may refer to:

- Any one of many railroad stations of the Rock Island Railroad

These include:

== Arkansas ==
- Blue Mountain Depot
- Carlisle Rock Island Depot, Carlisle, Arkansas, listed on the National Register of Historic Places (NRHP) in Lonoke County, Arkansas
- Rock Island Railway Depot (Fordyce, Arkansas), listed on the NRHP in Dallas County, Arkansas
- Rock Island Depot (Hazen, Arkansas), listed on the NRHP in Prairie County, Arkansas
- Rock Island Depot (Lonoke, Arkansas), listed on the NRHP in Lonoke County, Arkansas
- Rock Island-Argenta Depot, North Little Rock, Arkansas, listed on the NRHP in Pulaski County, Arkansas
- Rock Island Depot-Weldon, Weldon, Arkansas, listed on the NRHP in Jackson County, Arkansas

== Colorado ==
- Arriba Depot
- Burlington station (Colorado)
- Calhan Depot
- Colorado Springs Depot
- Flagler Depot
- Limon Depot
- Ramah Depot
- Simla Depot
- Stratton Depot

== Illinois ==
- Auburn Park station
- Bureau Junction, located on the main line between Chicago and Colorado Springs
- Chillicothe Depot, Illinois
- DePue station
- Englewood station, located on the commuter line between Chicago and Joliet
- Geneseo station, located on the main line between Chicago and Colorado Springs
- Hamilton Park station, located on the commuter line between Chicago and Joliet
- Joliet station, located on the commuter line between Chicago and Joliet
- Lafayette station (Illinois)
- La Salle station
- Marseilles Depot, located on the main line between Chicago and Colorado Springs
- Morris station, located on the main line between Chicago and Colorado Springs
- Normal Park station
- Ottawa station (Illinois)
- Peoria Depot, Peoria, Illinois, NRHP-listed
- Rock Island Depot, NRHP-listed
- Tiskilwa station, located on the main line between Chicago and Colorado Springs
- Washington Heights station

== Iowa ==
- Atlantic Depot
- Clarion Depot
- Council Bluffs Depot
- Des Moines Station, main hub for Rock Island with lines in 6 directions
- Dows Depot
- Grinnell Union Depot, located on the main line between Chicago and Colorado Springs
- Iowa City Depot
- Oskaloosa Depot, listed on the NRHP in Mahaska County, Iowa
- Pella Depot located on the line between Des Moines and Washington
- Rock Rapids Depot located on the line between Sioux Falls and Ellsworth
- Stuart Depot located on the main line between Chicago and Colorado Springs
- Vinton Depot
- Walker Depot
- Wilton Depot

== Kansas ==
- Rock Island Depot (Abilene, Kansas), listed on the NRHP in Dickinson County, Kansas
- Rock Island Depot (Wichita, Kansas), listed on the NRHP in Kansas

== Minnesota ==
- Rock Island Depot (Faribault, Minnesota), listed on the NRHP in Minnesota

== Nebraska ==
- Beatrice Depot
- De Witt Depot
- Fairbury Rock Island Depot and Freight House, Fairbury, Nebraska, listed on the NRHP in Nebraska
- Hebron Depot
- Jansen Depot, located on the main line between Chicago and Colorado Springs
- Rock Island Depot (Lincoln, Nebraska), listed on the NRHP in Nebraska
- Omaha Union Station
- Ruskin Depot
- South Bend Depot
- Thompson Depot located on the main line between Chicago and Colorado Springs

== Oklahoma ==
- Rock Island Depot (Chickasha, Oklahoma), listed on the NRHP in Oklahoma
- Rock Island Depot (El Reno, Oklahoma), listed on the NRHP in Oklahoma
- Rock Island Depot (Enid, Oklahoma), listed on the NRHP in Oklahoma
- Rock Island Depot (Grandfield, Oklahoma), listed on the NRHP in Oklahoma
- Hobart Rock Island Depot, Hobart, Oklahoma, listed on the NRHP in Oklahoma
- Sayre Rock Island Depot, Sayre, Oklahoma, listed on the NRHP in Oklahoma
- Walters Rock Island Depot, Walters, Oklahoma, listed on the NRHP in Oklahoma
- Rock Island Passenger Station (Waurika, Oklahoma), listed on the NRHP in Oklahoma

== South Dakota ==
- Clear Lake Depot
- Elkton Depot
- Sioux Falls Depot, listed on the NRHP in South Dakota

== See also ==
- Chicago, Rock Island and Pacific Railroad Depot (disambiguation)
- Rock Island Railroad Bridge (Columbia River), Rock Island, Washington, listed on the NRHP in Washington
- Rock Island (disambiguation)
