= Chicago, Rock Island and Pacific Railroad Depot =

Chicago, Rock Island and Pacific Railroad Depot may refer to:

Any of numerous train stations of the Chicago, Rock Island and Pacific Railroad

== These include ==
- Chicago, Rock Island, and Pacific Railroad Depot (Blue Mountain, Arkansas), listed on the NRHP in Arkansas
- Chicago, Rock Island and Pacific Railroad Depot (Marseilles, Illinois), listed on the NRHP in Illinois
- Chicago, Rock Island & Pacific Railroad Depot (Atlantic, Iowa), listed on the NRHP in Iowa
- Chicago, Rock Island & Pacific Railroad Passenger Depot (Council Bluffs, Iowa), listed on the NRHP in Iowa
- Chicago, Rock Island & Pacific Railroad Depot (Des Moines, Iowa), NRHP-eligible
- Chicago, Rock Island and Pacific Railroad-Grinnell Passenger Station, listed on the NRHP in Iowa
- Chicago, Rock Island & Pacific Railroad Depot (Iowa City, Iowa), listed on the NRHP in Iowa
- Chicago, Rock Island and Pacific Passenger Depot-Pella, Pella, IA, listed on the NRHP in Iowa
- Chicago, Rock Island and Pacific Railroad Depot (Stuart, Iowa), Stuart, IA, listed on the NRHP in Iowa
- Chicago, Rock Island and Pacific Railroad-Wilton Depot, Wilton, Iowa, listed on the NRHP in Iowa

== See also ==
- Rock Island Depot (disambiguation)
- Chicago, Rock Island and Pacific Railroad Stone Arch Viaduct, Shelby, IA, listed on the NRHP in Iowa
