= Des Moines station =

Des Moines station could refer to the following current and former transport facilities in Des Moines, Iowa:

- DART Central Station, local transportation hub
- Des Moines Bus Station, home of intercity bus services
- Des Moines Rock Island Depot, which closed in 1970
- Des Moines Union Station, which closed in 1959
- East Union Depot (Des Moines, Iowa)

== See also ==
- Kent Des Moines station
