= National Register of Historic Places listings in Tillman County, Oklahoma =

Location of Tillman County in Oklahoma

This is a list of the National Register of Historic Places listings in Tillman County, Oklahoma.

This is intended to be a complete list of the properties and districts on the National Register of Historic Places in Tillman County, Oklahoma, United States. The locations of National Register properties and districts for which the latitude and longitude coordinates are included below, may be seen in a map.

There are 10 properties and districts listed on the National Register in the county.

This National Park Service list is complete through NPS recent listings posted March 14, 2025.

== Current listings ==
	Name on the Register	Image	Date listed	Location	City or town	Description
1	Grandfield Downtown Historic District	Grandfield Downtown Historic District	June 20, 2002 (#02000656)	100 block of W. 2nd St., ½ block of E. 2nd St., bounded by northern and southern alleys. 34°13′50″N 98°40′59″W	Grandfield	
2	William and Mabel Donahoo Hubbard House	William and Mabel Donahoo Hubbard House	March 21, 1991 (#91000310)	323 E. 5th St. 34°13′39″N 98°40′46″W	Grandfield	
3	Humphreys Drugstore Building	Humphreys Drugstore Building	June 18, 1992 (#92000797)	106 E. 2nd St. 34°13′52″N 98°40′58″W	Grandfield	
4	J.D. Laney House		February 3, 1984 (#84003441)	Southwest of Frederick; 34°20′20″N 99°04′24″W	Frederick	
5	Manitou Jail	Manitou Jail	December 13, 2016 (#16000851)	NE intersection of 3rd St. and US 183; 34°30′31″N 98°58′58″W	Manitou	
6	Ramona Theatre	Ramona Theatre	November 8, 1984 (#84000377)	114 S. 9th St. 34°23′21″N 99°01′05″W	Frederick	
7	Rock Island Depot	Rock Island Depot	September 23, 1996 (#96000978)	201 S. Bridge Rd. 34°13′51″N 98°40′44″W	Grandfield	
8	Tillman County Bank of Grandfield	Tillman County Bank of Grandfield	June 18, 1992 (#92000796)	123 W. 2nd St. 34°13′50″N 98°41′03″W	Grandfield	
9	Tillman County Courthouse	Tillman County Courthouse	August 24, 1984 (#84003455)	201 N. Main St. 34°23′29″N 99°01′01″W	Frederick	
10	Tipton Orphans Home		August 28, 2024 (#100010779)	1000 North Broadway Avenue; 34°30′41″N 99°08′28″W	Tipton	

== See also ==
- List of National Historic Landmarks in Oklahoma
- National Register of Historic Places listings in Oklahoma
