= Ottawa station (disambiguation) =

Ottawa station is the primary train station in Ottawa, Ontario, Canada. It could also be:

- Ottawa Central Station, the former intercity bus terminal in Ottawa, Ontario, Canada
- Ottawa station (Rock Island Line), a former station in Ottawa, Illinois
- Old Depot Museum, a historic train station and museum in Ottawa, Kansas, United States
- Senate of Canada Building, formerly Ottawa Union Station
