= Lincoln station (Rock Island Line) =

Lincoln
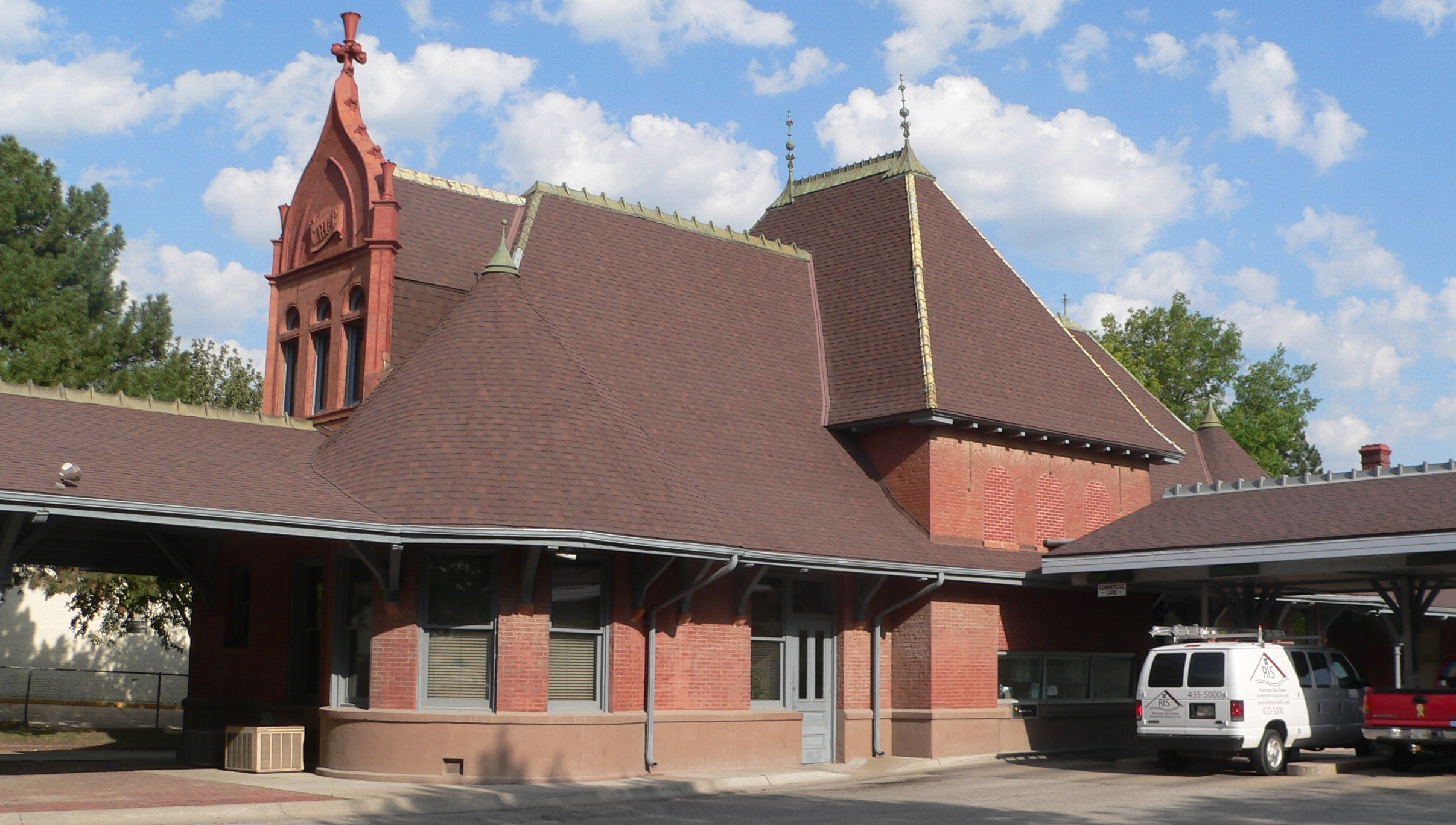
- Rock Island Depot

General information
- Location: 1944 O Street, Lincoln, Nebraska 68510
- System: Former Rock Island Line passenger rail station

History
- Opened: 1893
- Closed: 1968

Services
Preceding station	Chicago, Rock Island and Pacific Railroad	Following station
Rokeby toward Colorado Springs	Main Line	Prairie Home toward Chicago
- Rock Island Depot
- U.S. National Register of Historic Places
- Location within Nebraska
- Location: 1944 O St., Lincoln, Nebraska
- Coordinates: 40°48′52″N 96°41′33″W
- Area: 0.5 acres (0.20 ha)
- Built: 1892
- Architect: Eugene Woerner
- Architectural style: Renaissance
- NRHP reference No.: 71000487
- Added to NRHP: September 3, 1971
Location

The Rock Island Depot in Lincoln, Nebraska is a historic railroad station which served passenger trains of the Chicago, Rock Island and Pacific Railroad (Rock Island Line) from 1893 to 1966. The station served trains including the Rock Island's Rocky Mountain Rocket (Chicago - Colorado Springs). When the Rocky Mountain Rocket was terminated on October 15, 1966, the Rock Island's passenger service was discontinued west of Omaha. Thus, Lincoln lost its passenger service at that time.

It was listed on the National Register of Historic Places on September 3, 1971. The buildings are now occupied by a branch of Union Bank and Trust.

Most of Lincoln's former Rock Island Line trackage has been converted to rail trails.
