= Utica station (Illinois) =

Utica
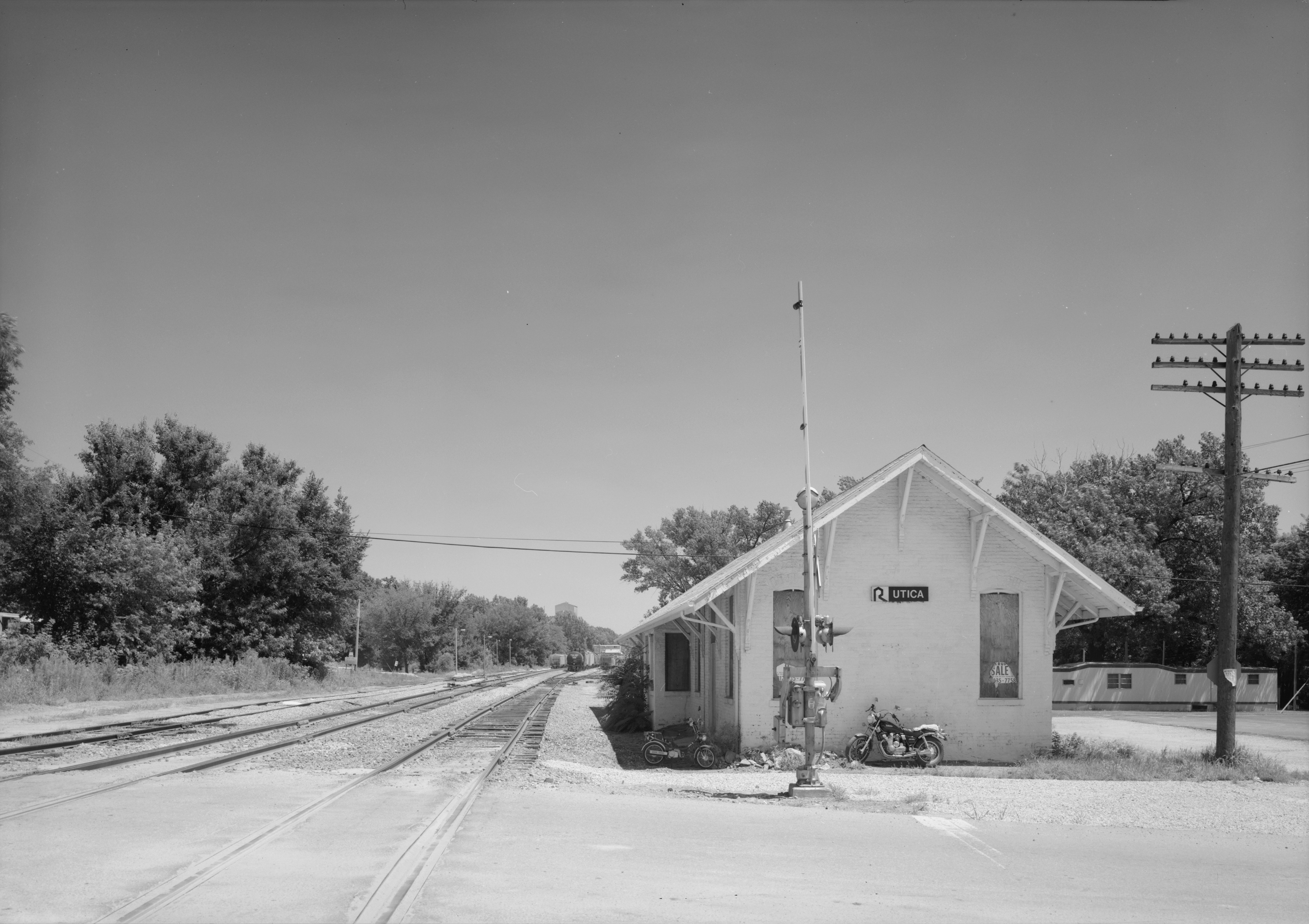
- Utica station in 1986.

General information
- Location: Mill Street; North Utica, Illinois
- Coordinates: 41.342705°N 89.008929°W
- System: Former Rock Island Line passenger rail station
- Owner: tracks owned by CSX Transportation
- Platforms: 1 side platform
- Tracks: 2

Construction
- Structure type: at-grade

Services
Preceding station	Chicago, Rock Island and Pacific Railroad	Following station
Former services
Peru–LaSalle toward Colorado Springs	Main Line	Ottawa toward Chicago
Location

Utica station was a Chicago, Rock Island and Pacific Railroad station in North Utica, Illinois (also known as Utica). The station is about 90 miles west of Chicago and is on one of the few double tracked parts of the CSX New Rock Subdivision (Joliet—Bureau). It is also just west of a grain elevator and a small yard to load hopper cars. The building was heavily damaged by an April 20, 2004 tornado, that killed 8 in Utica. Because of that damage, it was eventually razed.
