= Peru–LaSalle station =

Peru – LaSalle
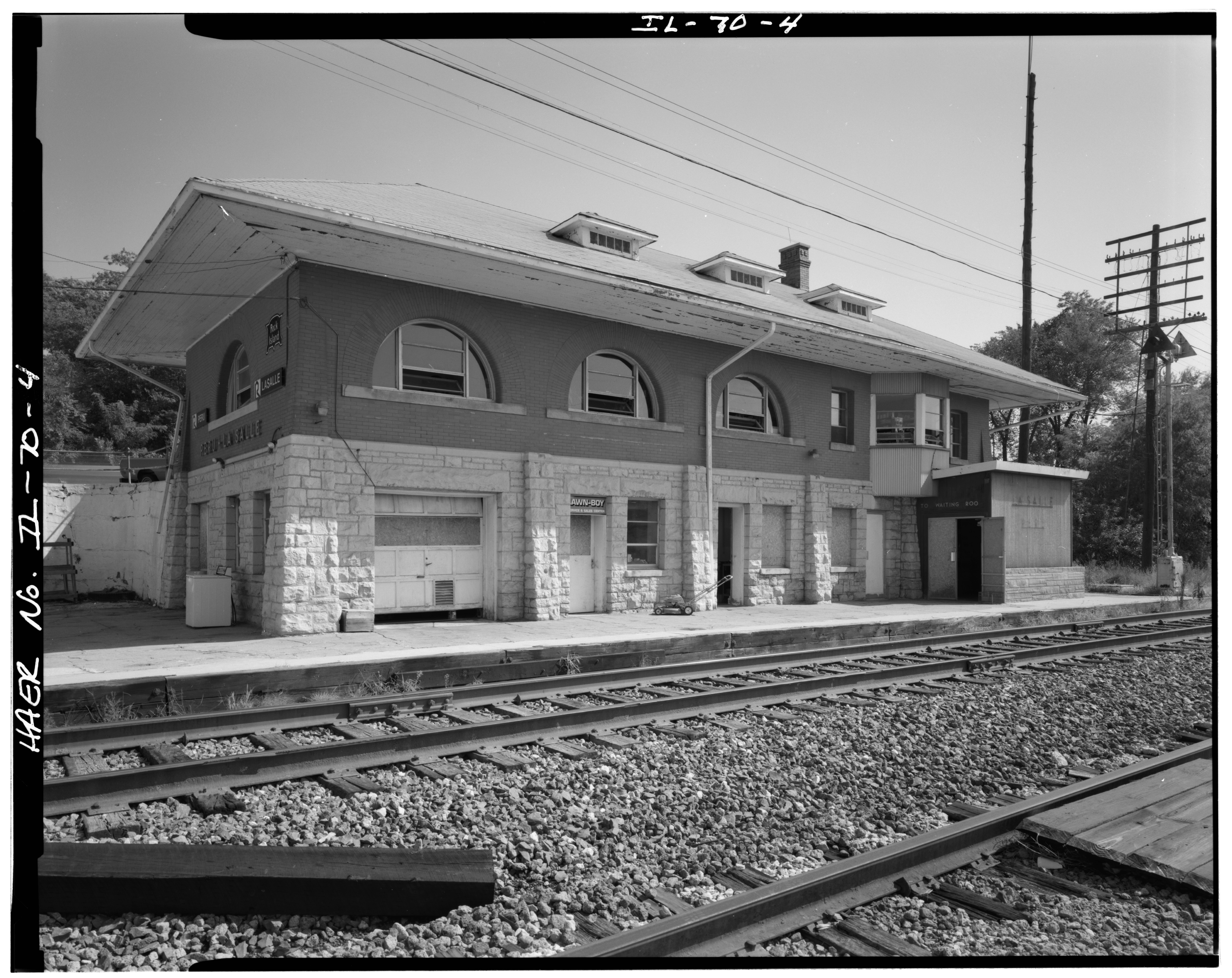
- South and west façades from northeast

General information
- Location: 1st Street and Canal Street; LaSalle, Illinois
- Coordinates: 41°19′38.7″N 89°6′4.5″W
- System: Former Rock Island Line passenger rail station
- Owner: Building: local business Track: CSX Transportation
- Line: Rock Island Line main line
- Platforms: 1 side platform
- Tracks: 1

Construction
- Structure type: at-grade

Services
Preceding station	Chicago, Rock Island and Pacific Railroad	Following station
Former services
Spring Valley toward Colorado Springs	Main Line	Utica toward Chicago
Location

Peru – LaSalle station was a Chicago, Rock Island and Pacific Railroad station situated between the towns of Peru and LaSalle, Illinois. The station building—which still exists as a lawn and garden center—is located on the north side of the track, on 1st Street. LaSalle/Peru was the original eastern terminus of the Rock Island Line, as it first traveled from Rock Island, Illinois to connect with the Illinois and Michigan Canal. "The Rock" was eventually liquidated, and now the track is operated by CSX, with the Iowa Interstate Railway getting some service via trackage rights.
