= Section (rail transport) =

In rail transport, a section could refer to: a portion of a train that may be operated independently and/or combined with other sections to operate as a single unit; or a portion of railway line designated for signalling or maintenance; or an interior portion of a sleeping car made up of two double seats during daytime that convert to two double berths during nighttime.

Trains could be split into multiple sections for reasons including: an abundance of freight or passengers requiring the use of a second train to cover a route; two or more routes with a common start point but multiple destinations on separate lines. Where multiple trains are used on the same route to convey an excess of freight or passengers, the trains will be defined as "first section", "second section", "third section", etc. to differentiate the vehicles for dispatching. Although it was not always the case that the first section travelled first, this naming and travel sequence was generally followed by convention. Each section prior but not the last would display green classification signals in the form of either flags or lamps at the head end.

== By country ==
=== United States ===
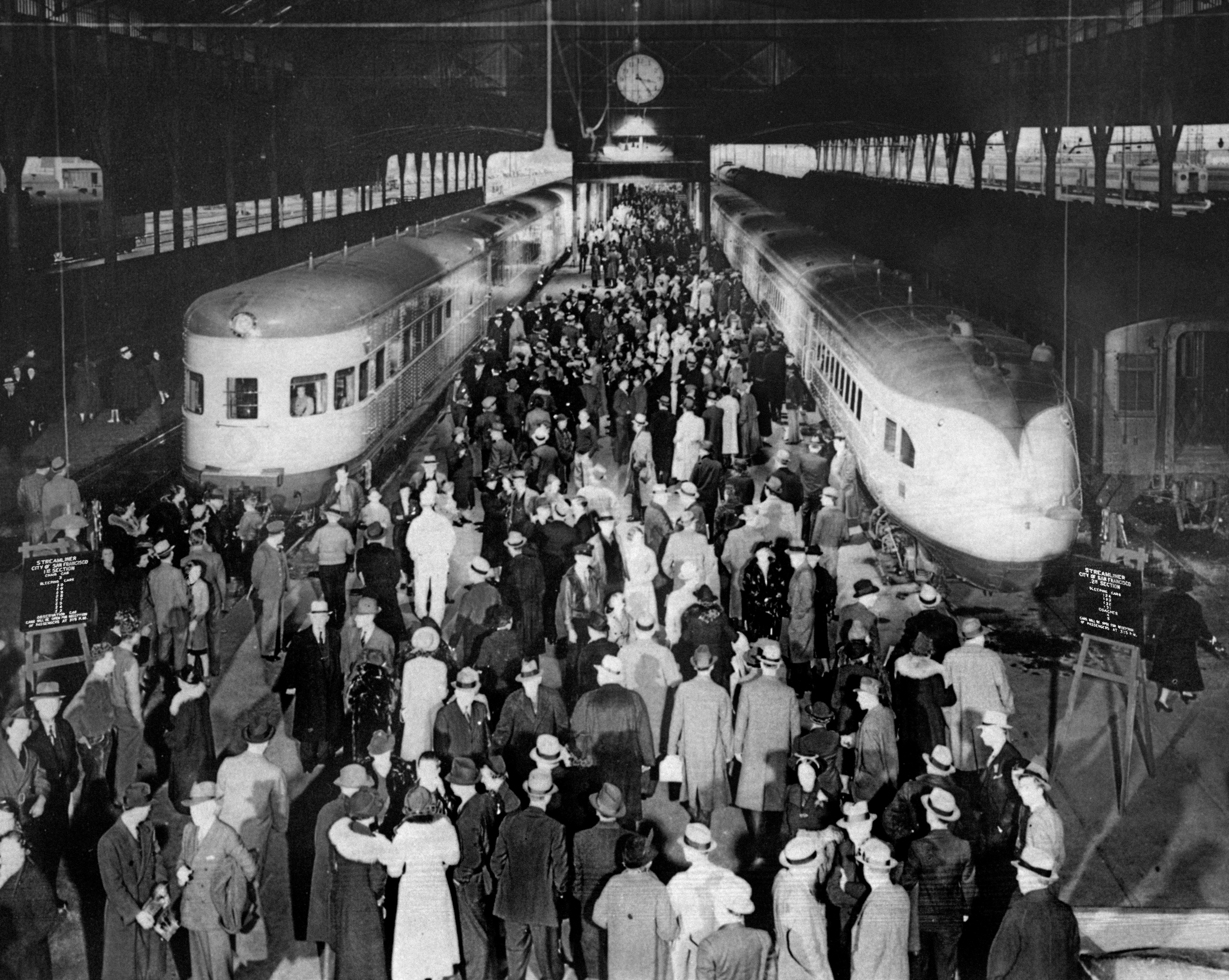
Two sections of the City of San Francisco were run on January 2, 1938, for the introduction of the route's new equipment (left).

Trains with common start points and multiple destinations

- The Rocky Mountain Rocket passenger train of the Chicago, Rock Island and Pacific Railroad was operated in multiple sections. The two sections were combined from Chicago to Limon, Colorado, where they were split into sections and subsequently operated as two trains, one to Denver and one to Colorado Springs. The process was reversed for the eastbound direction as the two sections were combined in Limon for the trip to Chicago. The Rock Island commissioned construction of the AB6 locomotive specifically for this service.
- Santa Fe's Grand Canyon Limited was operated in multiple sections. Two sections were combined from Chicago to Barstow, California, where they were split with one section continuing to San Francisco and the other to Los Angeles.

Some accidents and incidents

- October 10, 1888; Mud Run disaster – The seventh of eight sections of a passenger service on the Lehigh Valley Railroad in Pennsylvania collided with the rear of the stopped sixth section, telescoping the seventh section's locomotive through the last two cars of the sixth section, killing 64 and injuring 50.
- August 7, 1903 – The Great Wallace Show circus train was split into two sections for its journey to Durand, Michigan. The first section arrived without incident, but the second section did not slow for the yard and rear-ended the first section, killing 26.
- January 10, 1918 – The southbound Katy Flyer was operated as two sections. While the first section was stopped at the coal chute in Granger, Texas, for refueling, the second section rear-ended it killing 3 and injuring 11 passengers.

== See also ==
- Dividing train
- Through coach
- Slip coach
