= Seely Creek Guard Station =

Coordinates: 39.3122°N 111.4296°W

The Seely Creek Guard Station is a forestry guard headquarters, near Ephraim in Utah, United States. It was built in 1907–1908 by the Manti National Forest, with improvements made to the building by the Civilian Conservation Corps during the Great Depression in 1934.

Owing to a nearby road being upgraded, the station was hardly used by the 1970s, nearly derelict by the 1990s. It was going to be demolished, until both the Forest Service and local people got together to save it. It was restored and renovated as part of the Forest Service Cabin Rental Program between 2002 and 2008, becoming available for rental in the summer of that year.

== See also ==
- Great Basin Research Station Historic District
