= Quad Cities Rocket =

Illinois passenger train

Overview
- Service type: Inter-city rail
- Status: Discontinued
- Locale: Illinois
- Predecessor: Rocky Mountain Rocket
- First service: 1970
- Last service: December 31, 1978
- Former operator(s): Chicago, Rock Island & Pacific Railroad

Route
- Termini: Chicago, Illinois; Rock Island, Illinois
- Distance travelled: 181 mi (291 km)
- Service frequency: Daily

Technical
- Track gauge: 4 ft 8 1/2 in (1,435 mm)

The Quad Cities Rocket was a named passenger train of the Chicago, Rock Island and Pacific Railroad. It operated on a route between Chicago and Rock Island, Illinois. It was a remnant of one of the Rock Island's premier trains, the Rocky Mountain Rocket. That train's route had been cut back to Omaha in 1966; after a year without a name, it was renamed The Cornhusker. In 1970, the train took its final form when its western terminus was cut all the way back to Rock Island.

The railroad initially declined to hand passenger operations over to Amtrak in 1971 and the Quad Cities continued to run as one of the company's two remaining routes (the other being the Peoria Rocket). That year, a stop was added at Sheffield. The State of Illinois subsidized the cost of service, contributing $500,000 in 1977 to offset losses by the railroad (equivalent to $2.59 million in 2024 adjusted for inflation). Trains ran until December 31, 1978 when the Rock Island ended its intercity passenger operations.
