= Grand Canyon Limited =

ATSF Railway passenger service

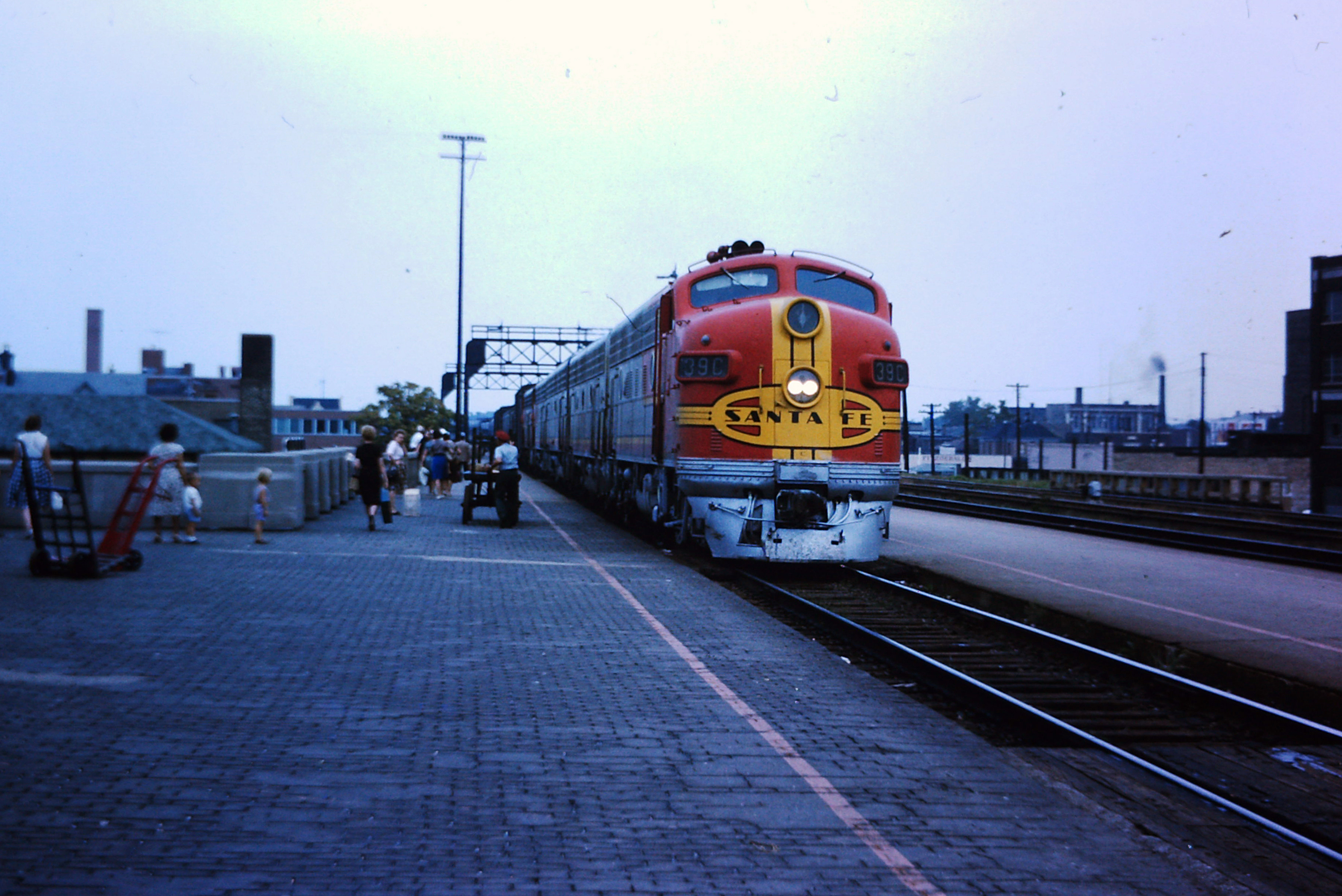
- EMD F7 #39C leads the Grand Canyon into Joliet in August 1963.

Overview
- Service type: Inter-city rail
- Status: Discontinued
- Locale: Midwestern and Southwestern United States
- First service: June 29, 1929
- Last service: May 1, 1971
- Former operator: Santa Fe

Route
- Termini: Chicago; Los Angeles
- Average journey time: 51 hours, 10 minutes (westbound); 48 hours (eastbound)
- Service frequency: Daily
- Train numbers: 23 and 24
- Lines used: Grand Canyon Railway, Southern Transcon

On-board services
- Seating arrangements: Chair cars Dormitory lounge car
- Sleeping arrangements: Roomettes; Double bedrooms
- Catering facilities: Dining car
- Baggage facilities: Baggage car

Technical
- Track gauge: 4 ft 8 1/2 in (1,435 mm) standard gauge
- Operating speed: 43.7 mph (70.3 km/h) (westbound); 46.6 mph (75.0 km/h) (eastbound)

The Grand Canyon Limited was one of the named passenger trains of the Atchison, Topeka and Santa Fe Railway. It was train Nos. 23 & 24 between Chicago, Illinois, and Los Angeles, California.

== History ==
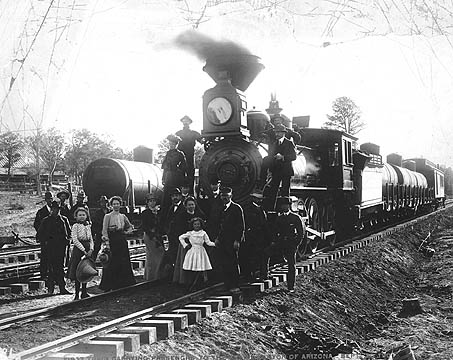
A group photo of passengers from the first run of the Grand Canyon Railway in 1901.

In 1901 the Santa Fe Railroad completed a 64-mile (103-km) branch from Williams, Arizona, to "Grand Canyon Village" at the South Rim of Grand Canyon National Park. The first scheduled train arrived from Williams on September 17 of that year; branch line trains and excursions from Southern California, Chicago, and Texas could run directly to the Rim. On June 29, 1929, service commenced on the Grand Canyon Limited, which became a celebrated vacation train.

The westward train split at Barstow, one section running to San Francisco (Oakland-Richmond) via the Tehachapi Loop while the other continued to Los Angeles. In 1938 it began running via Amarillo instead of La Junta; in 1950 it became two trains west of Kansas City, one by each route.

During World War II the Limited often ran in two or three sections carrying troops. In later years the train lost passengers to the railroad's newer trains such as the Super Chief with its streamlined cars.

The Grand Canyon train lost its name in early 1968 when the railway petitioned the ICC to drop service to Grand Canyon National Park; the train would continue as Trains 23 and 24 until the May 1, 1971, handover of all passenger service to Amtrak. While the Santa Fe had been willing to continue operating its famed Chiefs and the San Diegan, the prospect of having to operate its less successful routes until at least 1976 led it to get out of passenger service altogether. The Grand Canyon had been an anachronism for some time. It remained a mostly whistle stop train long after the automobile made this scheduling model obsolete for passenger service. Despite this, the Santa Fe continued operating whistle stops along the Grand Canyon route in order to more efficiently deliver mail parcels. However, when the Post Office abruptly pulled its mail contracts in 1967, the Grand Canyon became a particularly large albatross around the Santa Fe's neck, especially when the ICC turned down requests to withdraw the train.

=== Timeline ===
- September 17, 1901: The Santa Fe inaugurates service on the 64-mile (103 km) Grand Canyon Railway, running between Williams, Arizona, and the South Rim of Grand Canyon.
- January 1905: The Santa Fe-built El Tovar Hotel opens its doors. The luxurious destination resort is situated just 20 feet (6.1 m) from the canyon rim.
- June 29, 1929: The Grand Canyon Limited enters service; schedule 66 hours each way between Chicago and Los Angeles.
- June 4, 1938: the Grand Canyon Limited is rerouted over the Belen Cutoff through Amarillo, Texas. Transit time is reduced to 60 hr 15 min westward and 58 hr 35 min eastward.
- June 2, 1946: The Grand Canyon Limited begins running via Riverside-Fullerton) instead of Pasadena.
- June 8, 1947: The train receives its first diesel locomotives and stainless-steel lightweight passenger cars. The train is broken into two sections and the name is shortened to the Grand Canyon; the schedule is reduced to 48 hours, 45 minutes.
- July 1968: The Santa Fe discontinues all passenger service to the Grand Canyon National Park although the tracks are retained for freight service; the Grand Canyon train is stripped of its name becoming simply Trains 23 and 24.
- May 1, 1971: Amtrak takes over passenger service from the Santa Fe; the Southwest Chief begins service over much of the route.
- May 2, 1971: The final Train 24 that left Los Angeles on April 30 arrives at Dearborn Station in Chicago, ending Santa Fe revenue passenger service.
- 1974: The Santa Fe abandons the Grand Canyon Railway.
- September 17, 1989: Passenger service on the Grand Canyon Railway resumes after being purchased by private owners, independent from the Santa Fe in 1988.
- 2002: Santa Fe 3751, a preserved steam locomotive, runs on the line as part of the 2002 NRHS Convention. It briefly operated over the Grand Canyon Railway alongside the railroad's steam locomotives 18 and 4960.
- May 16, 2012: As part of the State of Arizona's centennial celebration, a 5-day journey to the Grand Canyon took place on a special excursion train of the same name. Santa Fe 3751 and Grand Canyon Railway 4960 pulled the train with the help of an Amtrak heritage unit over the Grand Canyon Railway route.

== Equipment used ==
Grand Canyon Limited departing the park at 4:10 p.m. May 16, 2012.

A variety of steam- and diesel-powered locomotives pulled the Grand Canyon Limited.

The original rolling stock delivered for the second-class Grand Canyon Limited was heavyweight cars built by Pullman-Standard.

- One baggage-dormitory-buffet smoking car
- Two "chair" cars (coaches)
- One dining car
- Three compartment and drawing-room sleepers
- One full open-end observation / parlor car

Train length varied; the train often ran in two or three sections during the summer months.

Near the end of its career, in 1968, a typical consist from Chicago to Kansas City was:

- Two ALCO PAs
- One streamline baggage car
- Two coaches

== Notable incidents ==
- July 7, 1945: Combined train No. 2 (The Scout) and No. 24, powered by locomotive #3733, strikes a "Caterpillar" shovel. The locomotive's pilot, headlight, and cylinders are damaged.
- December 27, 1949: Train No. 23 collides with an automobile at a grade crossing in Highland Park, California, which flattens the wheels on the locomotives.
- May 31, 1951: Combined train is sideswiped by train No. 123 in Chandler, Arizona, derailing cars #RSX 287, express #2558, baggage #1634, and "chair" cars #3108 and #3070. No. 123 cars baggage #1791 and #1601, "chair" cars #3087, #3158, and #1169, diner #1461, lounge #136, and sleepers L.S. Hungerford, Tonelea, Toreva, and Centgate also sustain damage.
- April 5, 1964: Train No. 123 with five diesel locomotives and 16 cars hits a rockslide at 81 miles per hour (130 km/h) near Doublea, Arizona, which derails the locomotives, ten baggage cars, and a passenger car.

== See also ==
- Grand Canyon Railway
- Passenger train service on the Atchison, Topeka and Santa Fe Railway
