= Blue Mountain, Arkansas =

Town in Arkansas

- Town
- Location in Logan County, Arkansas
- Coordinates: 35°07′52″N 93°42′58″W
- Country: United States
- State: Arkansas
- County: Logan

Area
  - Total: 1.07 sq mi (2.77 km^{2})
  - Land: 1.07 sq mi (2.76 km^{2})
  - Water: 0.0039 sq mi (0.01 km^{2})
- Elevation: 495 ft (151 m)

Population (2020)
  - Total: 88
  - Estimate (2025): 83 ▼
  - Density: 83/sq mi (31.9/km^{2})
- Time zone: UTC-6 (Central (CST))
  - Summer (DST): UTC-5 (CDT)
- ZIP code: 72826
- Area code: 479
- FIPS code: 05-07210
- GNIS feature ID: 2405283

Blue Mountain is a town in Logan County, Arkansas, United States. The population was 88 at the 2020 census.

== Geography ==
Blue Mountain is located south of the center of Logan County and is bordered to the east by Yell County.

The town sits in a valley bordered to the south by 860-foot-high (260 m) Potts Ridge and to the north by the west end of Mount Magazine, which 4 miles (6 km) farther east rises to the highest point in Arkansas at 2,753 feet (839 m). Arkansas Highway 10 passes through the town, leading west 5 miles (8 km) to Magazine and 12 miles (19 km) to Booneville, the southern Logan county seat, and east 11 miles (18 km) to Havana.

According to the United States Census Bureau, the town of Blue Mountain has an area of 1.1 square miles (2.8 km^{2}), all of it recorded as land. The town is drained by Ashley Creek, which flows to the south through Potts Ridge to Blue Mountain Lake, a reservoir on the Petit Jean River, an east-flowing tributary of the Arkansas River.

== Demographics ==
Historical population
Census	Pop.	Note	%±
1930	145		—
1940	171		17.9%
1950	122		−28.7%
1960	94		−23.0%
1970	108		14.9%
1980	112		3.7%
1990	146		30.4%
2000	132		−9.6%
2010	124		−6.1%
2020	88		−29.0%
2025 (est.)	83	▼	−5.7%
U.S. Decennial Census; 2014 Estimate

As of the census of 2000, there were 132 people, 55 households, and 33 families residing in the town. The population density was 47.2 people/km^{2} (122 people/mi^{2}). There were 67 housing units at an average density of 24.0 units/km^{2} (62 units/mi^{2}). The racial makeup of the town was 100.00% White.

There were 55 households, out of which 29.1% had children under the age of 18 living with them, 49.1% were married couples living together, 7.3% had a female householder with no husband present, and 38.2% were non-families. 32.7% of all households were made up of individuals, and 16.4% had someone living alone who was 65 years of age or older. The average household size was 2.40 and the average family size was 3.15.

In the town, the population was spread out, with 26.5% under the age of 18, 3.8% from 18 to 24, 25.8% from 25 to 44, 25.0% from 45 to 64, and 18.9% who were 65 years of age or older. The median age was 42 years. For every 100 females, there were 109.5 males. For every 100 females age 18 and over, there were 102.1 males.

The median income for a household in the town was $16,500, and the median income for a family was $23,750. Males had a median income of $32,500 versus $21,667 for females. The per capita income for the town was $10,481. There were 5.6% of families and 19.3% of the population living below the poverty line, including 23.5% of under eighteens and 3.8% of those over 64.
