= Pella station =

Former train station in Pella, Iowa

Pella
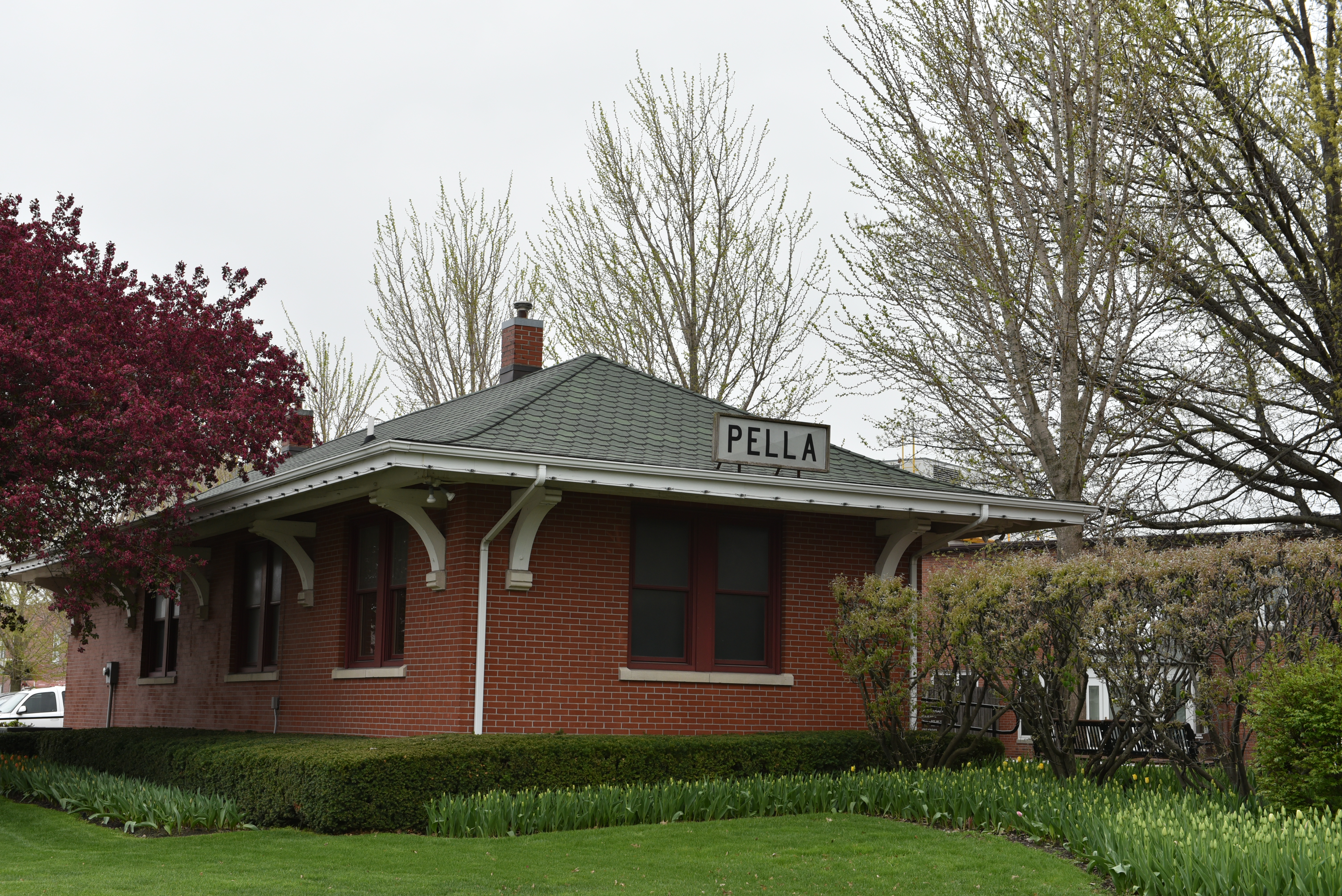

General information
- Location: 679 Oskaloosa Street, Pella, Iowa
- System: Former Rock Island Line passenger rail station

Services
Preceding station	Chicago, Rock Island and Pacific Railroad	Following station
Otley toward Des Moines	Des Moines – Washington	Leighton toward Washington
- Chicago, Rock Island and Pacific Passenger Depot-Pella
- U.S. National Register of Historic Places
- Location within Iowa Location within the United States
- Location: Junction of Main and Oskaloosa Sts. Pella, Iowa
- Coordinates: 41°23′54″N 92°54′57″W
- Area: less than one acre
- Built: 1906
- MPS: Advent & Development of Railroads in Iowa MPS
- NRHP reference No.: 91000909
- Added to NRHP: July 22, 1991
Location

Pella station, also known as the Rolscreen Museum, is a historic building located in Pella, Iowa, United States. The Des Moines Valley Railroad built the first tracks through the area in 1865, and they built a simple frame depot to serve passengers' needs. For 10 years, Pella served as the only rail stop in Marion County until a competing station was built in Knoxville, Iowa by the Chicago, Burlington, and Quincy Railroad. The Chicago, Rock Island & Pacific Railroad leased the Des Moines Valley's tracks beginning in 1878 and provided freight service through 1980. The old frame building was replaced, in 1906, with a single story, brick depot–a conventional building style for the railroad. The new, brick depot served as a passenger station until the latter 1940s. The last passenger service was as a stop on a short line motor train service between Eldon in southeast Iowa and Des Moines. The station was freight only by 1949.

In 1975 the future of the depot was thrown into question when the Rock Island Line filed for bankruptcy protection. However, the Pella Corporation, whose headquarters are adjacent, acquired the property and converted the depot into a company museum. It was listed on the National Register of Historic Places in 1991.
