= Great Basin Research Station Historic District =

Historic district in Utah, United States

- U.S. National Register of Historic Places
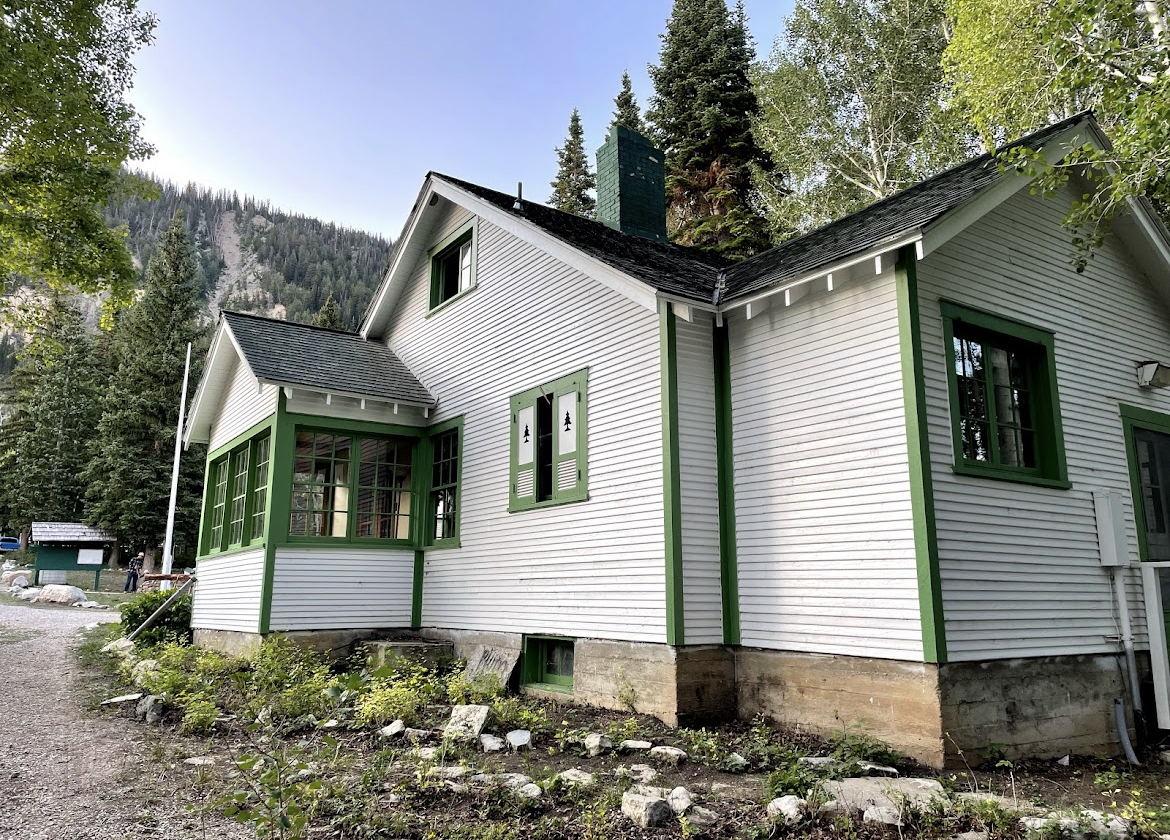
- The research station house

- Location within Utah Location within the United States
- Nearest city: Ephraim, Utah
- Coordinates: 39.319977°N 111.486679°W
- Area: 71.9 acres (0.291 km^{2})
- Built: 1912-16; 1933-36
- Built by: Civilian Conservation Corps
- Architect: U.S.F.S. architects
- Architectural style: Bungalow/craftsman, Colonial Revival, Forest Service Standards
- NRHP reference No.: 96000678
- Added to NRHP: June 28, 1996

The Great Basin Research Station Historic District, in Ephraim Canyon near Ephraim, Utah, is a historic district that was listed on the National Register of Historic Places in 1996.

The noncontiguous district includes two complexes of buildings about three miles apart.

The Headquarters portion is the experiment station headquarters complex, located on Forest Road 0053 off Ephraim Canyon Road, at 39.319977°N 111.486679°W, and is perhaps also known as Great Basin Station (per Google maps).

The Alpine Cabin portion is another complex of buildings, about three miles east, apparently at 39.301909°N 111.447435°W (based on Google Satellite searching and map sketch in nomination document). (This is not the Seely Creek Guard Station, on Forest Road 0050, at 39.312229°N 111.429447°W, just a bit further.)

It is located off Ephraim Canyon Road, which in the past was denoted Utah State Route 29 before 29's routing was revised. It is approximately 8 miles (13 km) east of Ephraim in what is now the Manti-La Sal National Forest. The two areas combined have area of 71.9 acres (0.291 km^{2}) area and include 13 contributing buildings, four contributing structures, one contributing object and three contributing sites.

Includes work designed by Architects of the United States Forest Service including a standard R-4 design building.
