= Walker station =

Walker
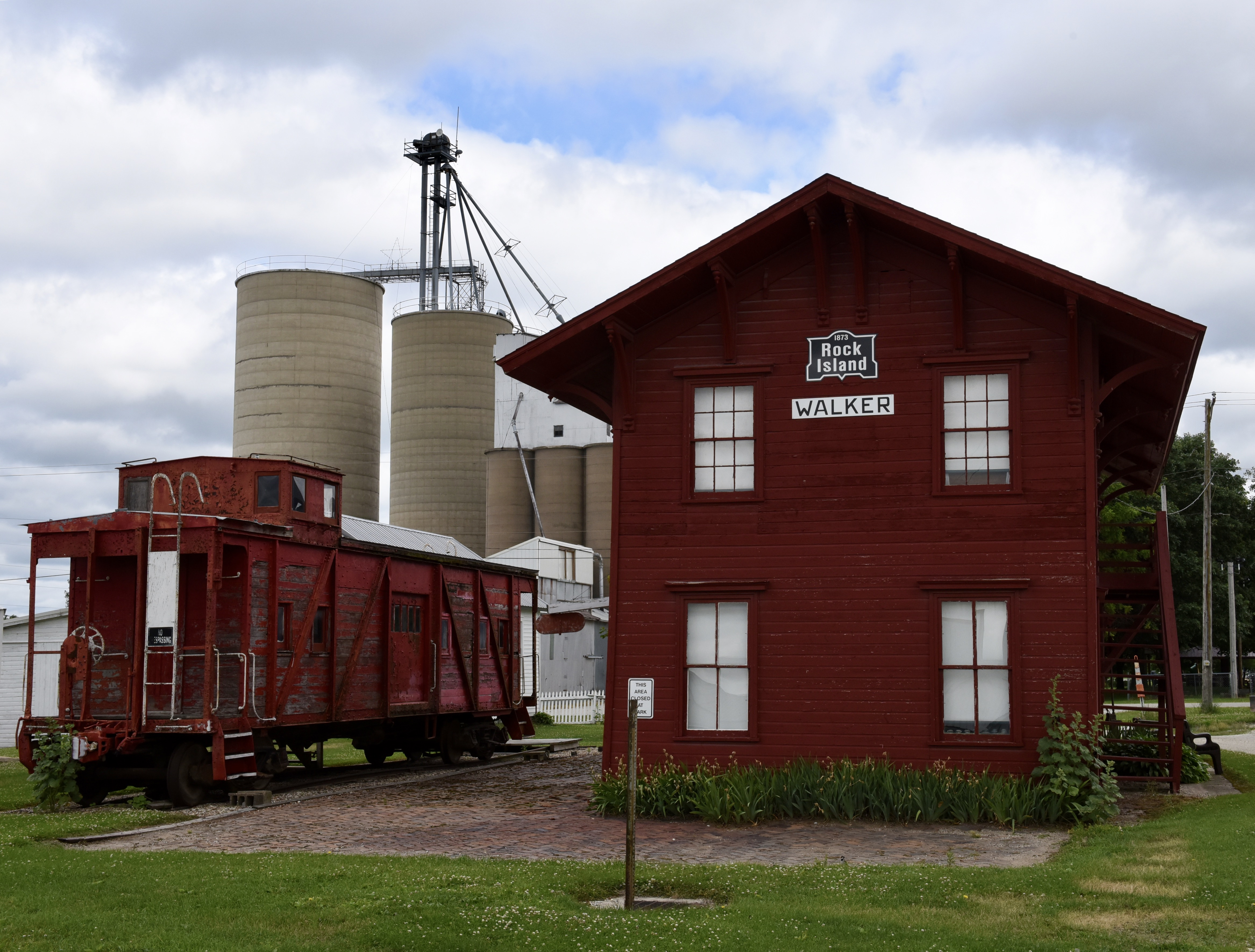
- The station in August 2007.

General information
- Location: 304 Rowley Street, Walker, Iowa 52352
- System: Former Rock Island Line passenger station
- Platforms: 1

History
- Opened: 1873
- Burlington, Cedar Rapids, and Minnesota Railroad: Walker Station
- U.S. National Register of Historic Places
- Location within Iowa Location within the United States
- Location: Between Rowley and Washington Sts., Walker, Iowa
- Coordinates: 42°17′10.8″N 91°46′56.3″W
- Area: less than one acre
- Built: 1873
- NRHP reference No.: 78001242
- Added to NRHP: February 14, 1978
Location

Walker Station is a historic building located in Walker, Iowa, United States. The two-story frame building with bracketed eaves was completed in 1873 along the Burlington, Cedar Rapids, and Minnesota Railway tracks. The depot also served its successor railroads: the Burlington, Cedar Rapids and Northern, and the Chicago, Rock Island and Pacific. Typical of many railroad towns in the Midwest, this is the first building that was built here and the town grew up around it. It is an example of a combination depot that was used for both passenger and freight usage in smaller communities. Because it has a ground level brick platform, service here was primary passenger and light freight service. A higher level of freight service would have required a raised platform.

The station was closed in 1976 and later turned into a museum. It was listed on the National Register of Historic Places in 1978.
