= RailsWest Railroad Museum =

Railroad museum in Iowa

Council Bluffs
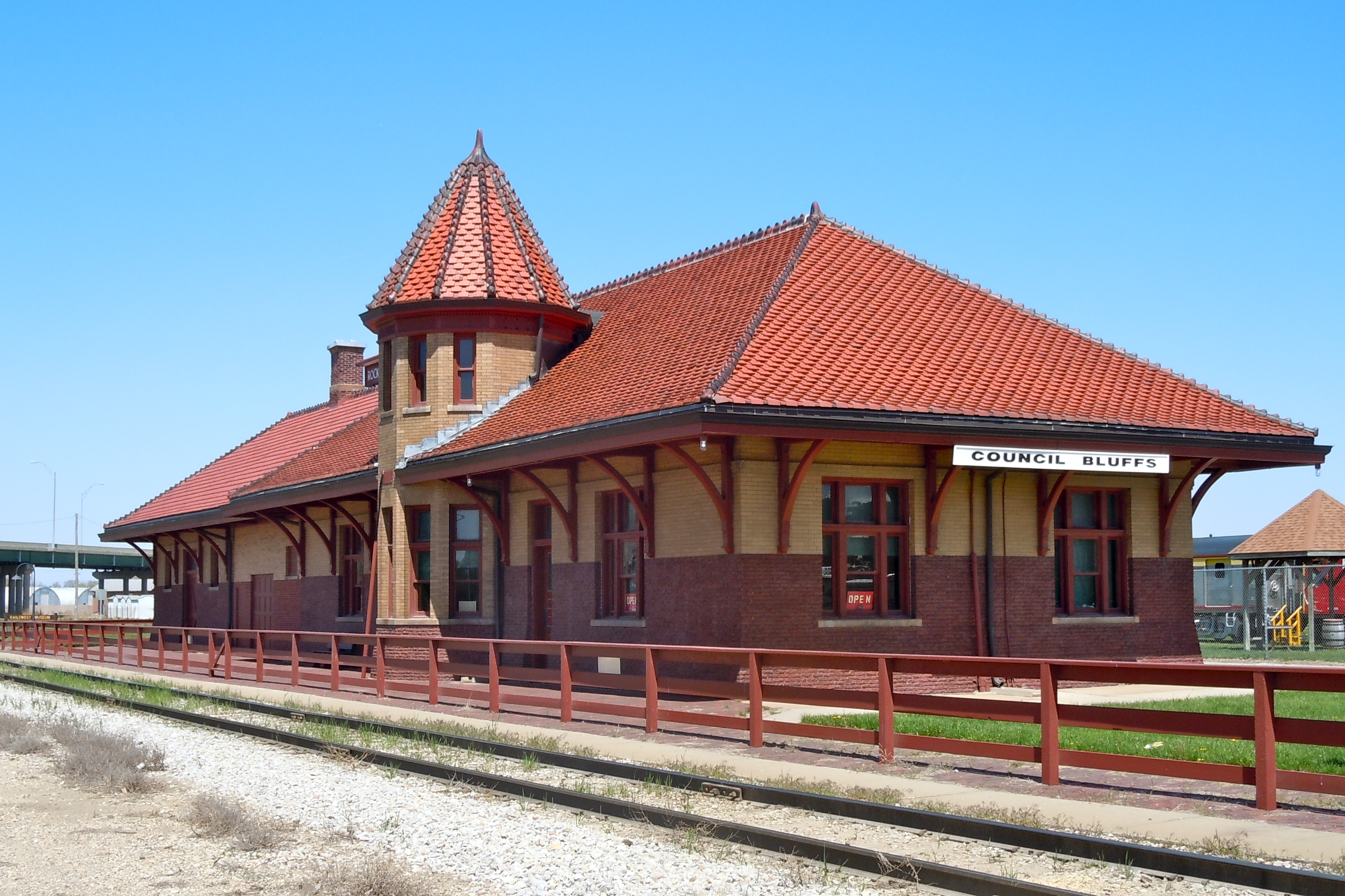
- Council Bluffs station in May 2011.

General information
- Location: 1512 South Main Street, Council Bluffs, Iowa 51503
- System: Former Rock Island Line passenger rail station

History
- Closed: 1971
- Rebuilt: 1899

Former services
Preceding station	Union Pacific Railroad	Following station
Omaha toward Ogden	Overland Route	through to Chicago & North Western/Milwaukee Road
Preceding station	Chicago, Rock Island and Pacific Railroad	Following station
Omaha toward Colorado Springs	Main Line	Underwood toward Chicago
- Chicago, Rock Island & Pacific Railroad Passenger Depot
- U.S. National Register of Historic Places
- Location within Iowa Location within the United States
- Location: 1512 S. Main St. Council Bluffs, Iowa
- Coordinates: 41°14′49″N 95°51′8″W
- Area: less than one acre
- Built: 1899
- Architect: Chief Engineer, CRI & PRR; Volk, John, & Co.
- Architectural style: Romanesque
- NRHP reference No.: 95000856
- Added to NRHP: July 21, 1995
Location

RailsWest Railroad Museum is a railroad museum operated by the Historical Society of Pottawattamie County at 16th Avenue and South Main Street and illustrates the history of railroads in Council Bluffs, Iowa.

== History ==
The museum is housed inside a Chicago, Rock Island and Pacific Railroad passenger depot that was also used by the Chicago, Milwaukee, St. Paul and Pacific. The depot is listed on the National Register of Historic Places as Chicago, Rock Island and Pacific Railroad Passenger Depot and also has been known as just Rock Island Depot. The depot opened in 1899 and would become a daily stop for the Rocky Mountain Rocket, Midwest Hiawatha, the Arrow, and Corn Belt Rocket before the end of passenger service in 1971. Similar Rock Island passenger depots were also constructed in Iowa City, Iowa and Ottawa, Illinois.

== Museum ==
RailsWest includes historical exhibits on the eight railroads that served the community along with displays on the Railway Mail Service and an extensive HO scale model railroad. Adjacent to the historic depot are Union Pacific locomotive 814 and Chicago, Burlington and Quincy locomotive 915, Chicago, Rock Island and Pacific Railroad and Chicago, Burlington and Quincy cabooses, a 1953 switch engine built by the Plymouth Locomotive Works, the Chicago, Burlington and Quincy Omaha lounge car, a Union Pacific boxcar, and Union Pacific Railway Post Office car 5908. RailsWest is adjacent to tracks of the Union Pacific, BNSF, and Iowa Interstate Railroad with a fenced-in area for railfanning.

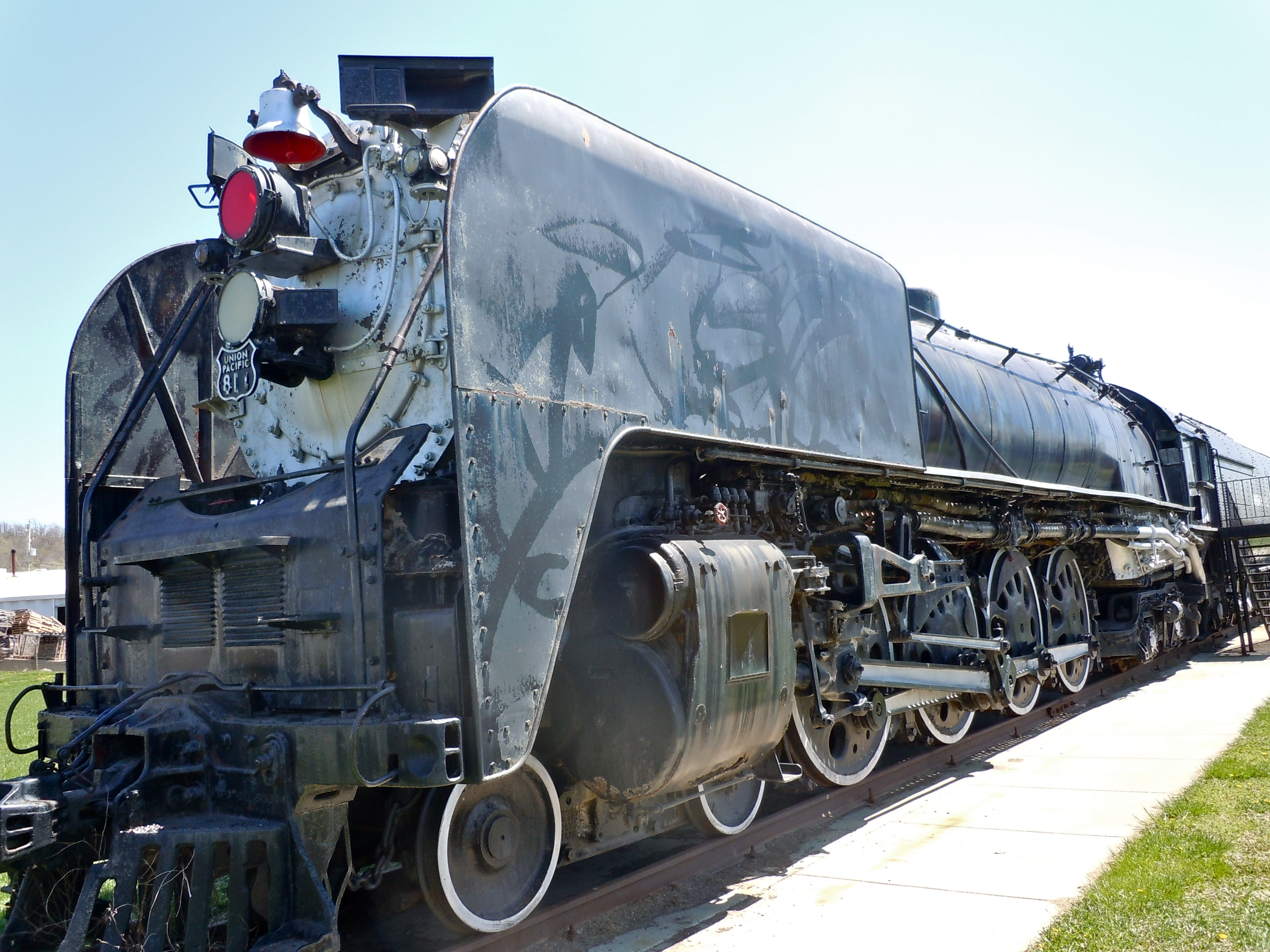
Union Pacific 814

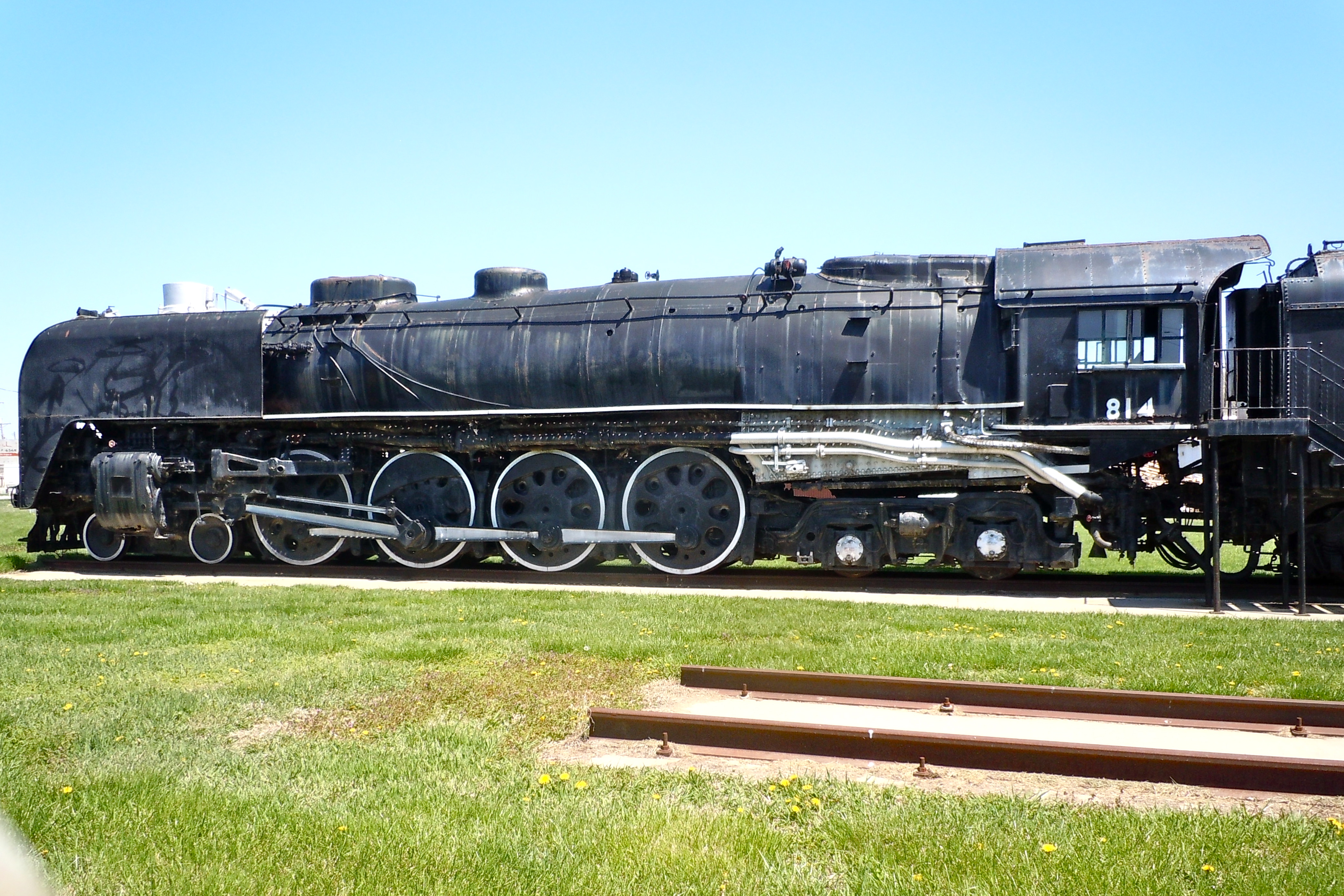
Union Pacific 814 side view

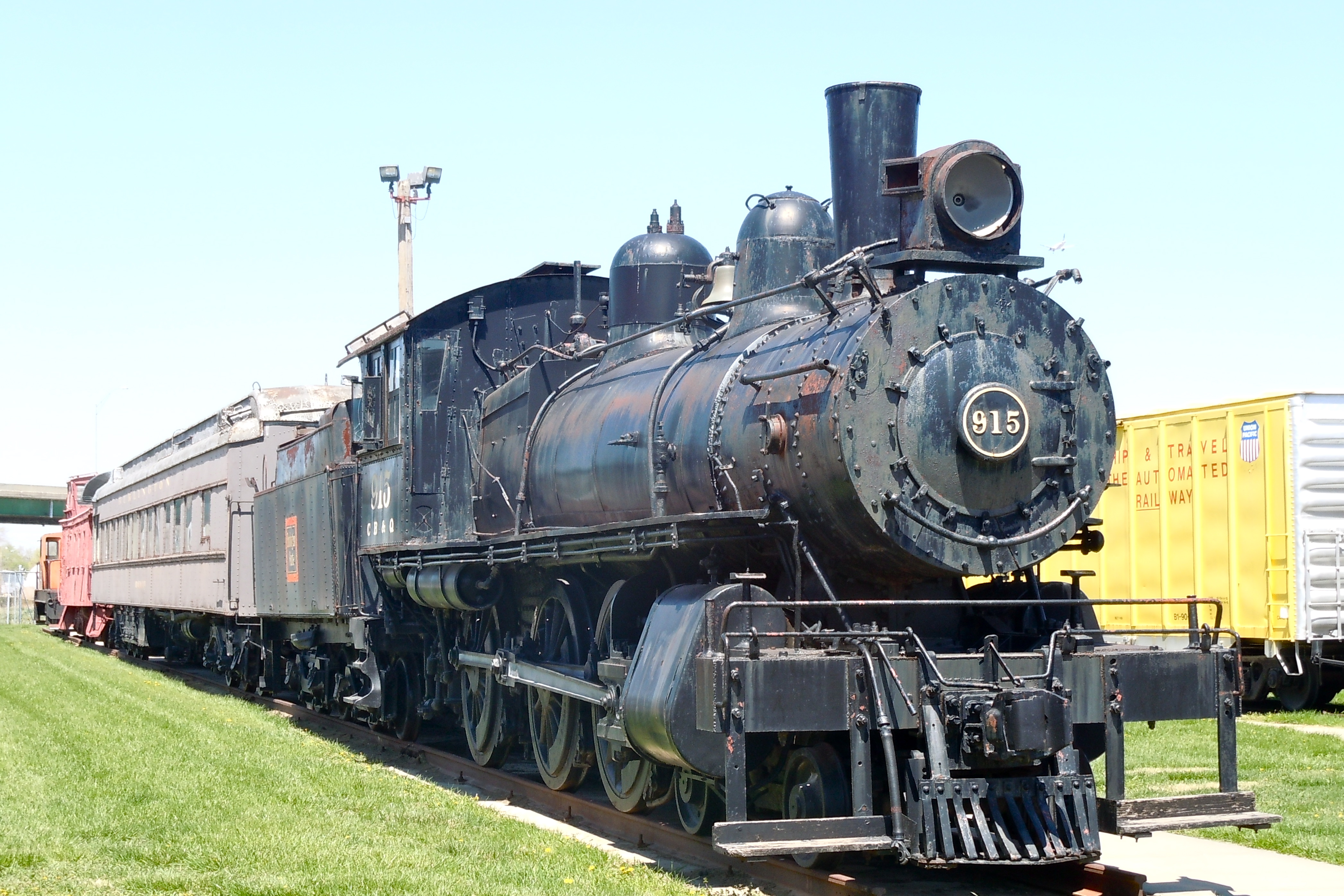
Chicago, Burlington and Quincy 915
