= Rock Island Depot (Grandfield, Oklahoma) =

- U.S. National Register of Historic Places
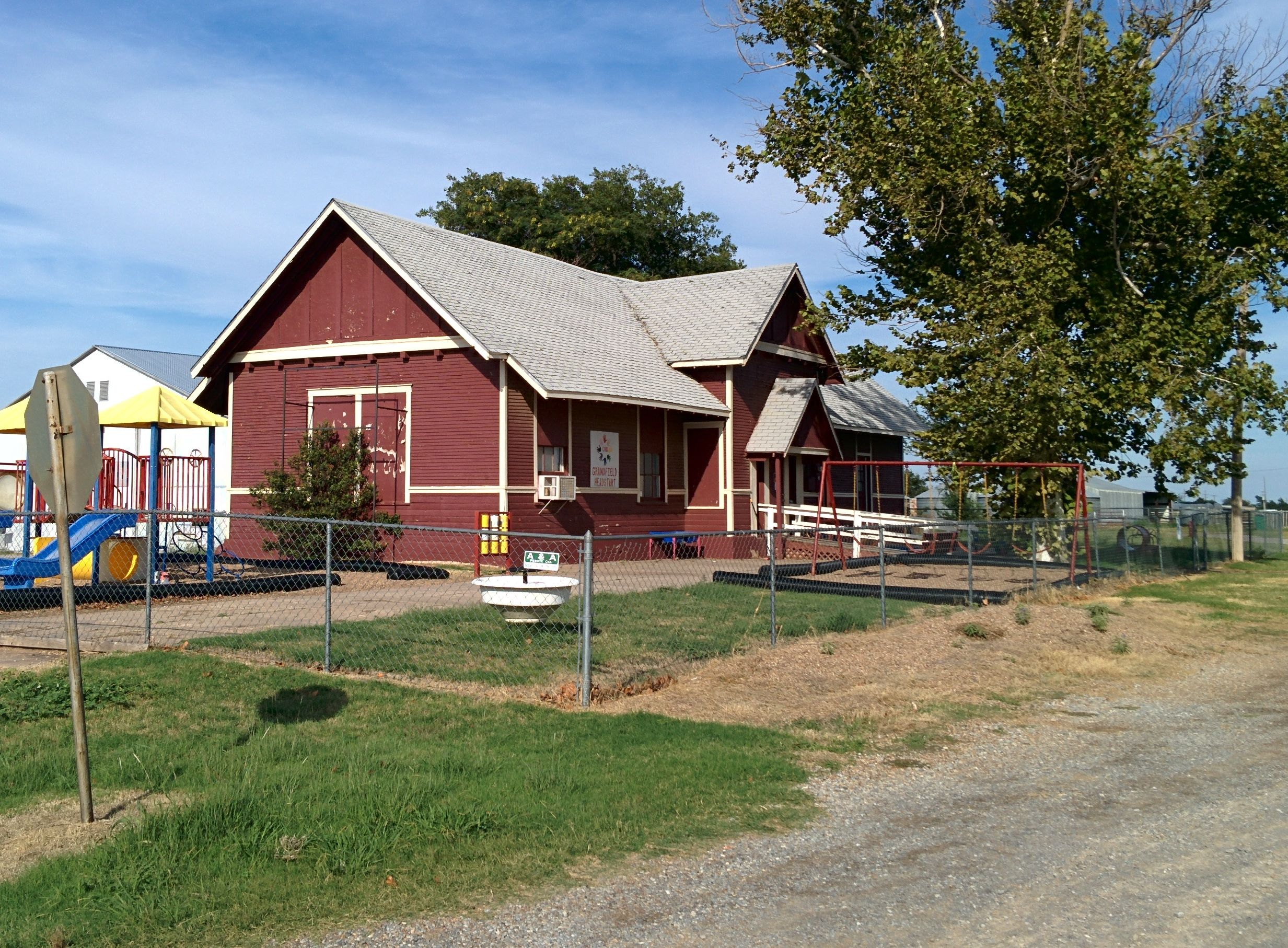

- Location within Oklahoma
- Location: 201 S. Bridge Rd., Grandfield, Oklahoma
- Coordinates: 34°13′51″N 98°40′44″W
- Area: less than one acre
- Built: 1920
- Built by: Chicago, Rock Island & Pacific Railway
- Architectural style: Tudor Revival
- NRHP reference No.: 96000978
- Added to NRHP: September 23, 1996

The Rock Island Depot in Grandfield, Oklahoma, at 201 S. Bridge Rd., was built in 1920. It was listed on the National Register of Historic Places in 1996.

It was a rail station of the Chicago, Rock Island and Pacific Railroad.

It is a wood-frame building on a concrete foundation, with a vernacular Tudor Revival style. (Note: Photos intended to accompany the Rock Island Depot nomination, but miss-filed under Great Basin Research Station Historic District's reference number, are these three photos from 1993. These are photos of Rock Island Depot in Grandfield, Oklahoma.)
