= Des Moines Bus Station =

Intercity bus station in Des Moines, Iowa

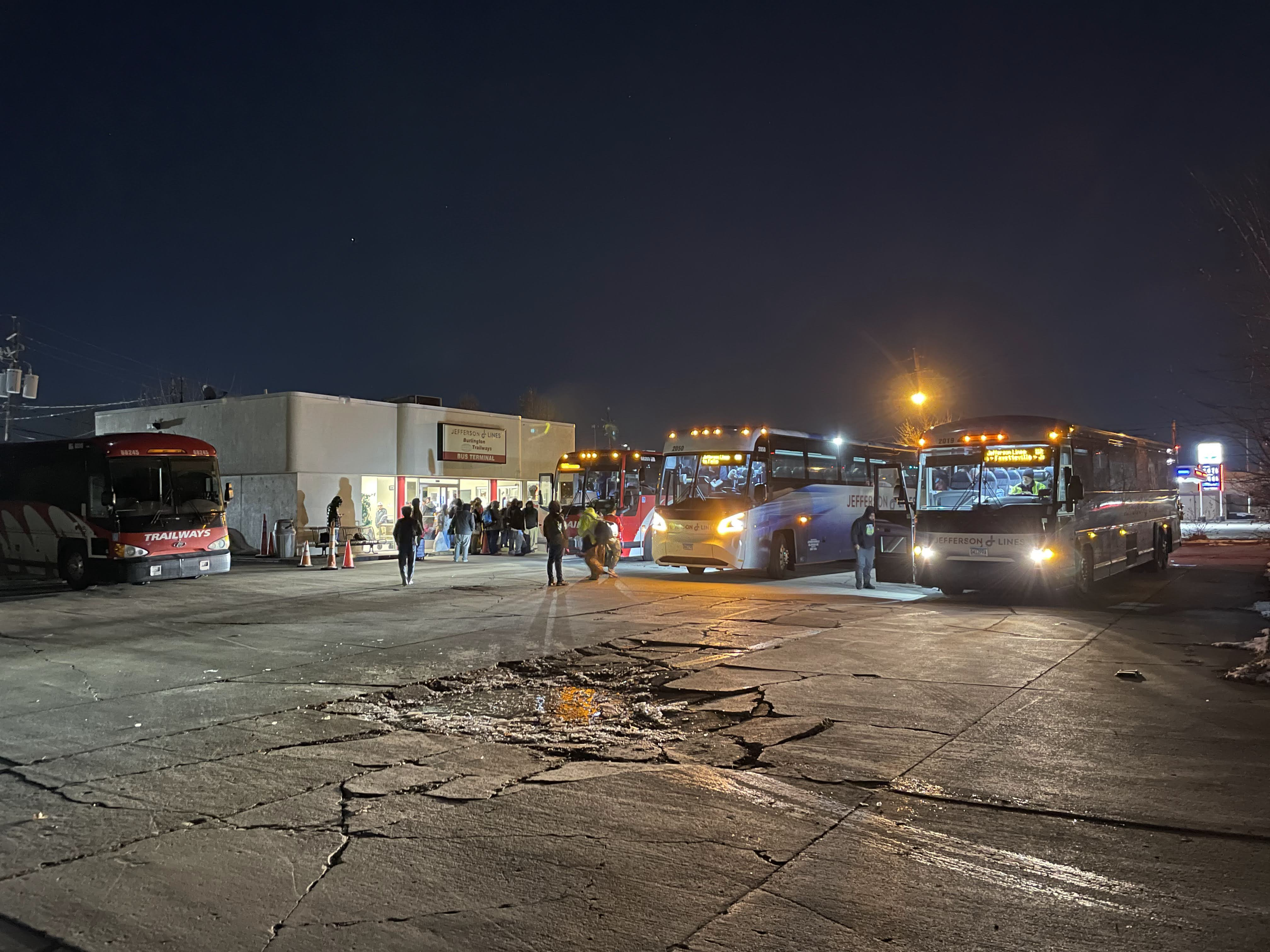
- The Second Avenue station in 2023

General information
- Location: 1641 East Euclid Avenue; Des Moines, Iowa
- Coordinates: 41.6273°N 93.5935°W
- Operator: Jefferson Lines
- Bus operators: Jefferson Lines; Greyhound Lines

Other information
- Website: Official website

History
- Opened: March 14, 2024
Location

The Des Moines Bus Station is an intercity bus station in the Highland Park neighborhood of Des Moines, Iowa. The station, managed by Jefferson Lines, also serves Greyhound Lines. The current building was opened as a bus terminal in 2024.

Des Moines has seen intercity bus transit since at least the early 1920s, when a union bus terminal operated on Sixth Avenue. In 1932, a new Union Bus Depot opened on Grand Avenue, while Burlington Bus Lines opened their own terminal in 1935 on Mulberry Street. The Burlington station was replaced in 1956 with a location on Locust Street. In 1972, a Greyhound Lines bus terminal opened on Keosauqua Way. This was replaced by a station on Second Avenue, which was open from 2013–2024.

== Attributes ==
The bus station building is a former warehouse in the Highland Park neighborhood, off Euclid Avenue and adjacent to the freight-only Mason City Subdivision of the Union Pacific Railroad. The bus station is managed by Jefferson Lines, but also serves Greyhound Lines.

== History ==
=== Early stations ===
The first intercity bus station in Des Moines was the Union Bus Station, which opened in February 1924 at 106 Sixth Avenue. On January 5, 1932, a new union bus depot opened at 505 Grand Avenue, built by Chicago & North Western Stages. Yet another new bus station would open in the city when Burlington Bus Lines began operations at their own facility on September 7, 1935, at Sixth and Mulberry.

The stations at Grand Avenue and Mulberry Street would remain the primary points of departure until 1956. On November 15, Continental American Trailways opened a new station at 1100 Locust Street to replace the 1935 built station on Mulberry Street. The new station would allow boarding of six buses at once, compared to four at the old site. Alongside Continental American Trailways, Jefferson Transportation Company and Marshall-Boonville Stage Line also moved to the new facility.

In 1972, the station at 505 Grand closed after 40 years of service, being replaced by a Greyhound Lines terminal at 1107 Keosauqua Way, which opened the morning of July 27. The $500,000 station provided eight bus bays and served Greyhound, Jefferson Lines, and Sedalia-Marshall-Boonville Stage Line. In the mid-1990s, the idea of moving the bus station to the Des Moines International Airport was floated, but never pursued.

=== 2013–2024 ===
By 2013, the bus station on Keosauqua Way was beginning to show its age, and Burlington Trailways and Jefferson Lines were the only remaining operators. Greyhound Lines, which had been the primary operator at the station for years, put the property up for sale in March, leading to a search for a new station. That new station was found at 1501 Second Avenue, in the River Bend neighborhood. A former gas station opened as the new bus terminal on December 30, 2013. The new station saw 22 daily buses upon opening, while the 1972 station has since been converted into a bank.

=== Current station ===
The bus station moved to 1641 East Euclid Avenue on March 14, 2024. Burlington Trailways ceased operation in September 2025.

== Connections ==
As of the June 2026 DART network redesign,, there is no direct service to the terminal by Des Moines Area Regional Transit. The nearest services operate on East 14th Street (U.S. Route 69).

== See also ==
- Des Moines Area Regional Transit
