= Des Moines Union Station =

Railroad station in Des Moines, Iowa

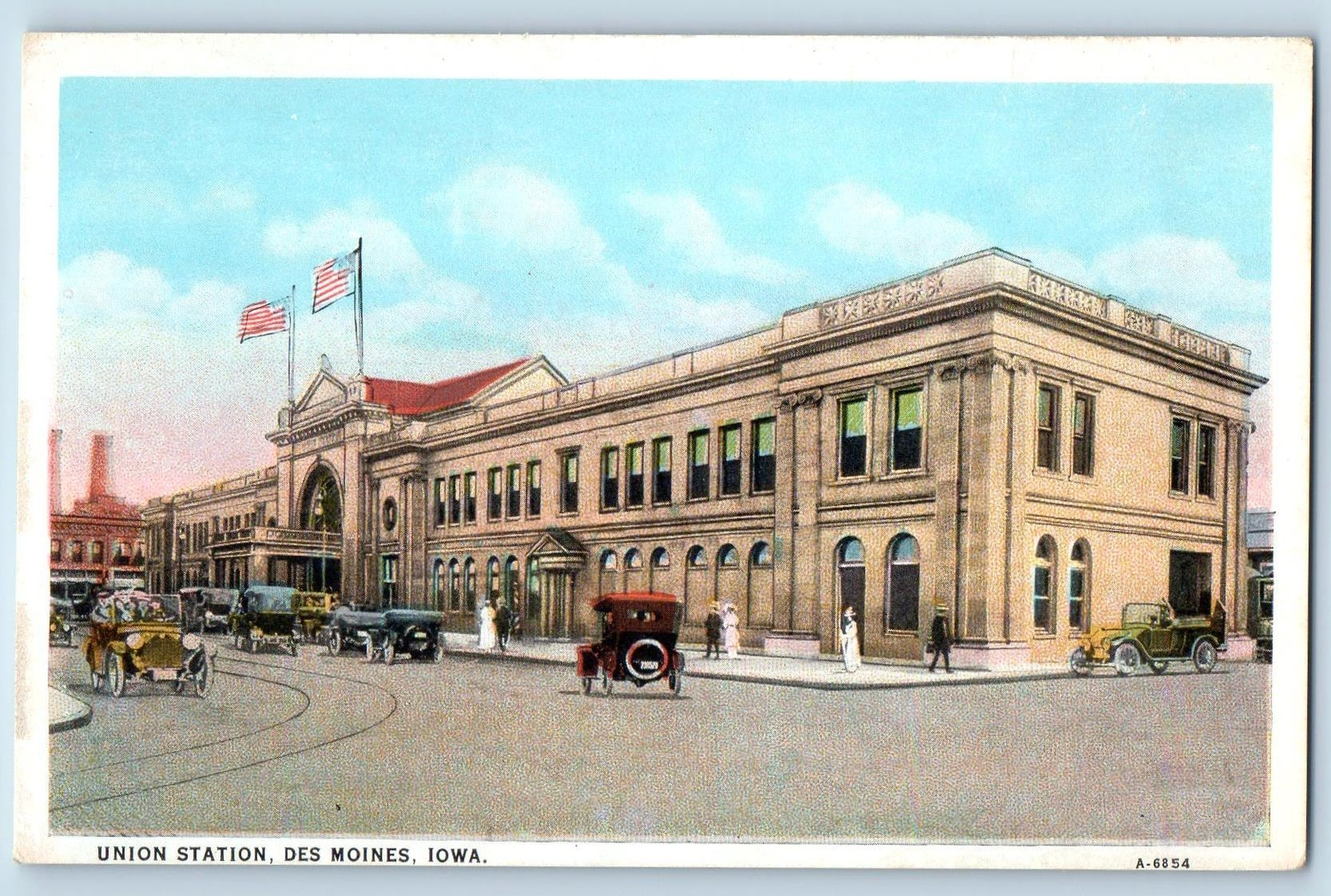
- Postcard of the station circa 1910

General information
- Location: Fifth and Cherry; Des Moines, Iowa
- Coordinates: 41.5839°N 93.6232°W
- Owner: Des Moines Union Railway

History
- Opened: April 3, 1899
- Closed: September 30, 1959

Former services
Preceding station	Burlington Route	Following station
Terminus	Des Moines – Albia	East Des Moines toward Albia
Preceding station	Chicago Great Western Railway	Following station
Millman toward Kansas City	Main Line	East Des Moines toward Minneapolis
Preceding station	Milwaukee Road	Following station
Clive toward Spirit Lake	Spirit Lake – Des Moines	Terminus
Preceding station	Wabash Railroad	Following station
Terminus	Des Moines – Moberly	East Des Moines toward Moberly
Location

Des Moines Union Station, also known as Des Moines Union Depot, was a railroad station in Des Moines, Iowa. It was owned and operated by the Des Moines Union Railway, itself co-owned by the Milwaukee Road and Wabash Railroad. The other principal railroads using Union Station were the Chicago, Burlington and Quincy Railroad and Chicago Great Western Railway. The station opened in 1899 and closed in 1959. It was demolished in 1975. The Chicago, Rock Island and Pacific Railroad used its own station, still standing, one block to the southeast.

== History ==
The station opened on April 3, 1899. The station was located on Cherry Street, between Fifth Street and Sixth Avenue, directly south of the Polk County Courthouse. The Chicago, Rock Island and Pacific Railroad had its own station on Vine between Fourth and Fifth Streets, to the southeast.

Passenger service ended on September 30, 1959, when the Wabash Railroad discontinued service between Des Moines, Iowa, and St. Louis, Missouri. The station building was demolished in 1975.
