= Ottawa station (Rock Island Line) =

Defunct train station in Ottawa, Illinois, USA

Ottawa
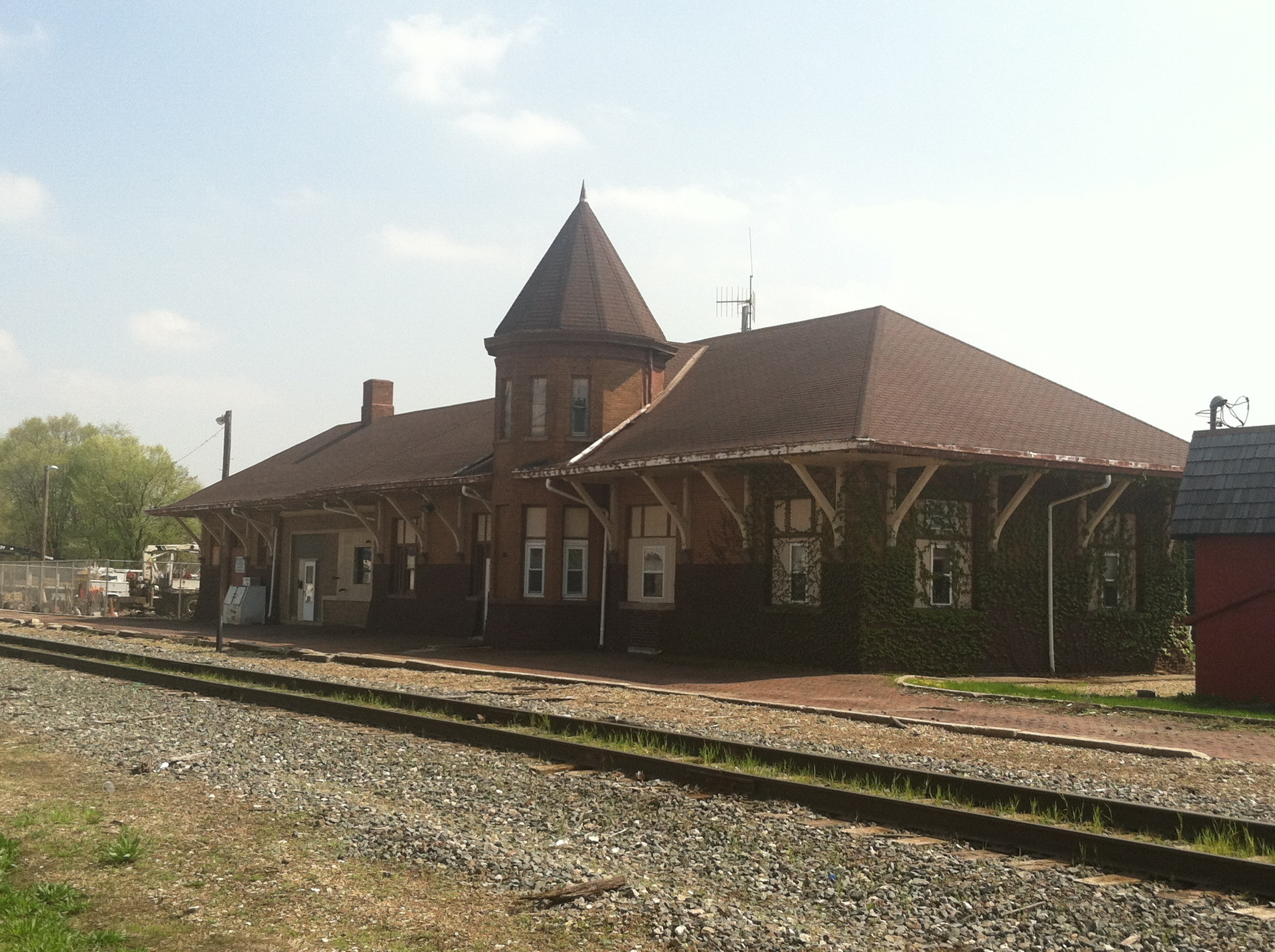
- The station in 2012.

General information
- Location: Marquette Street and IL 23 / IL 71 (Columbus Street); Ottawa, Illinois; United States
- Coordinates: 41.354573°N 88.840218°W
- System: Former Rock Island Line passenger rail station
- Owner: track owned by CSX Transportation
- Platforms: 1 side platform
- Tracks: 1 (formerly 2)

Construction
- Structure type: at-grade

Other information
- Status: disused

Services
Preceding station	Chicago, Rock Island and Pacific Railroad	Following station
Former services
Utica toward Colorado Springs	Main Line	Marseilles toward Chicago
Location

Ottawa station was a Chicago, Rock Island and Pacific Railroad station in Ottawa, Illinois. It was located just east of Columbus Street and on the south side of the track. The building had the same design as Rock Island Line stations in Iowa City and Council Bluffs, Iowa. The station is east of a junction with the Illinois Railway (former CB&Q branch line to Streator). The still standing station house is used for CSX maintenance of way vehicles.
