= Blue Mountain station (Arkansas) =

Demolished train station in Blue Mountain, Arkansas

Blue Mountain

General information
- Location: 386 Logan Street, Blue Mountain, Arkansas 72826
- System: Former Rock Island Line passenger rail station
- Line: Chicago, Rock Island and Pacific Railroad

History
- Opened: 1890s

Former services
Preceding station	Chicago, Rock Island and Pacific Railroad	Following station
Magazine toward Tucumcari	Tucumcari – Memphis	Waveland toward Memphis
- Chicago, Rock Island, and Pacific Railroad Depot
- U.S. National Register of Historic Places
- Location within Arkansas Location within the United States
- Location: Off AR 10, Blue Mountain, Arkansas
- Coordinates: 35°7′47″N 93°42′34″W
- Area: 1 acre (0.40 ha)
- Built: 1898
- Architectural style: Bungalow/craftsman
- NRHP reference No.: 78000607
- Added to NRHP: February 14, 1978
Location

The Chicago, Rock Island, and Pacific Railroad Depot was a historic railroad station off Arkansas Highway 10 in Blue Mountain, Arkansas. It was a single-story rectangular wood-frame structure, with a hip roof whose deep eaves were supported by triangular brackets. The station was built in the late 1890s to serve the local Chicago, Rock Island and Pacific Railroad line, and was a significant element of the community's growth until the 1930s. In 1939 it was purchased by a local community group and moved four lots from its original site, for use as a community center.

The station was listed on the National Register of Historic Places in 1978. It has since been demolished.

== See also ==
- National Register of Historic Places listings in Logan County, Arkansas
