= Chicago, Rock Island & Pacific Railroad Depot (Iowa City, Iowa) =

Former Chicago, Rock Island and Pacific Railroad Passenger Station

Iowa City
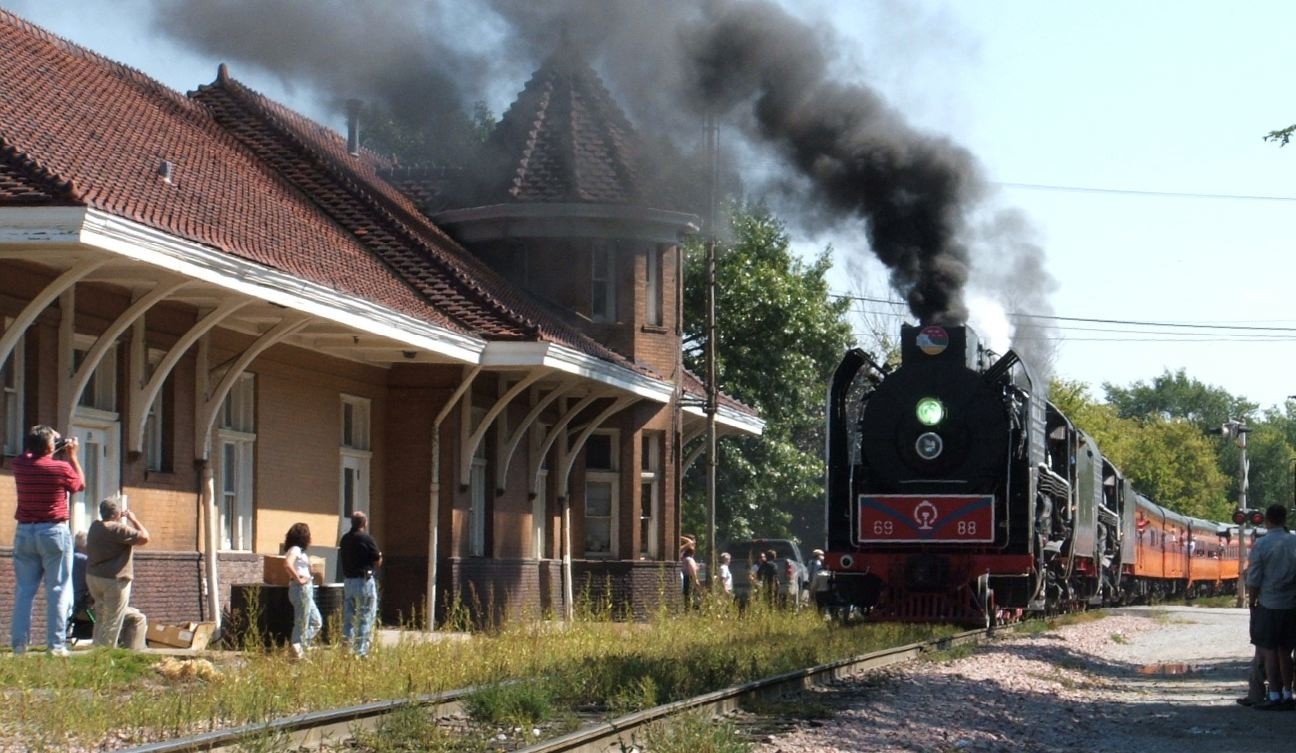
- A steam excursion stops at the depot in 2006.

General information
- Location: 115 Wright Street, Iowa City, Iowa 52240
- System: Former Rock Island Line passenger station
- Platforms: 1

History
- Opened: 1855
- Closed: 1970
- Rebuilt: 1898

Former services
Preceding station	Chicago, Rock Island and Pacific Railroad	Following station
Tiffin toward Colorado Springs	Main Line	Downey toward Chicago
- Chicago, Rock Island and Pacific Railroad Passenger Station
- U.S. National Register of Historic Places
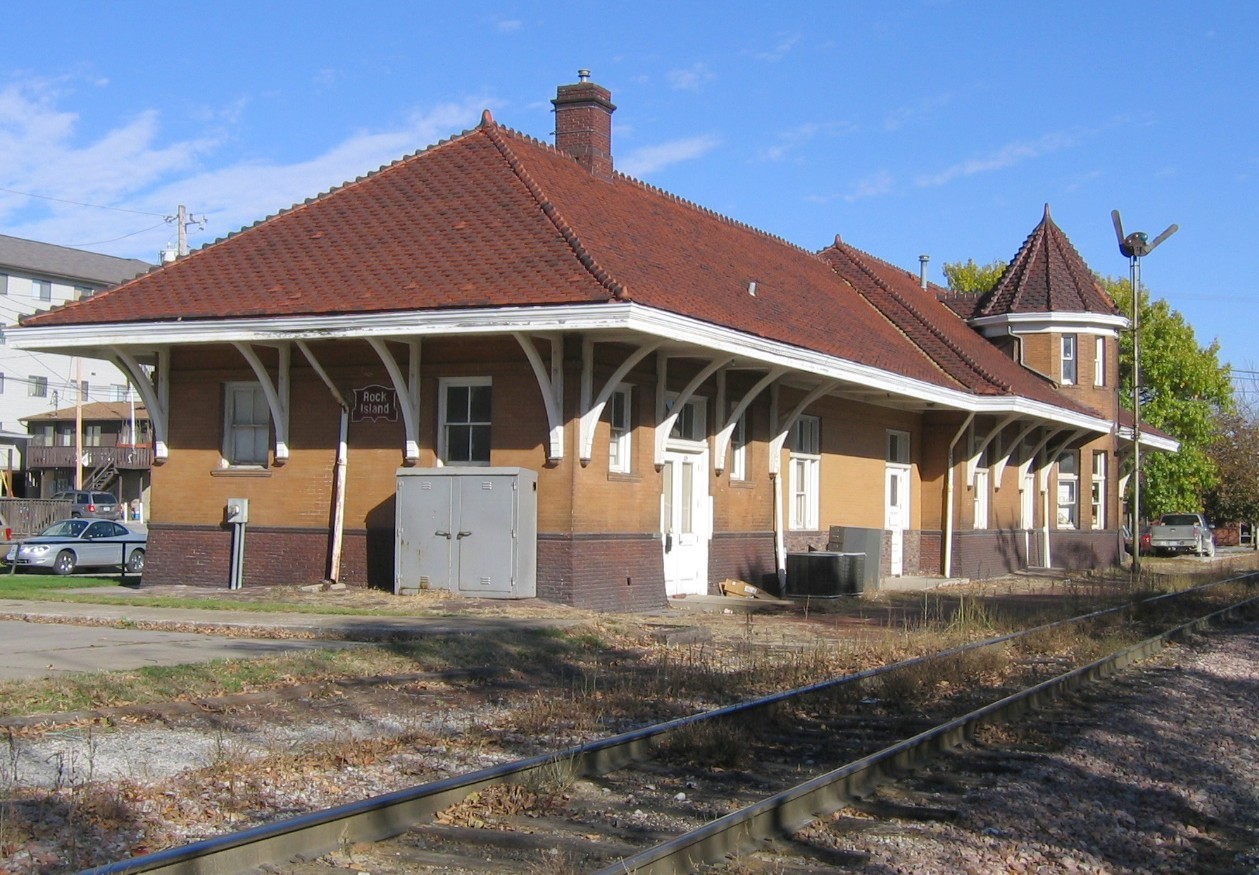

- Location within Iowa Location within the United States
- Location: 115 Wright St. Iowa City, Iowa
- Coordinates: 41°39′13″N 91°32′1″W
- Area: less than one acre
- Built: 1898
- Architectural style: Romanesque
- NRHP reference No.: 82000411
- Added to NRHP: December 10, 1982
Location

The Chicago, Rock Island and Pacific Railroad Passenger Station is a historic building located in Iowa City, Iowa, United States. Built in 1898 for passenger use, it was the second depot in the city. The first one was built by the Mississippi and Missouri Railroad, a predecessor of the Chicago, Rock Island and Pacific Railroad (CRI&P), in 1855. This one was built through the efforts of Harry Breene, the local Rock Island agent. W.K. McFarlin, CRI&P's superintendent of maintenance and construction oversaw the building's construction. Architecturally, it is a combination of the Richardsonian Romanesque and Victorian Romanesque. The depot was built to similar designs of stations in Ottawa, Illinois, and Council Bluffs, Iowa.

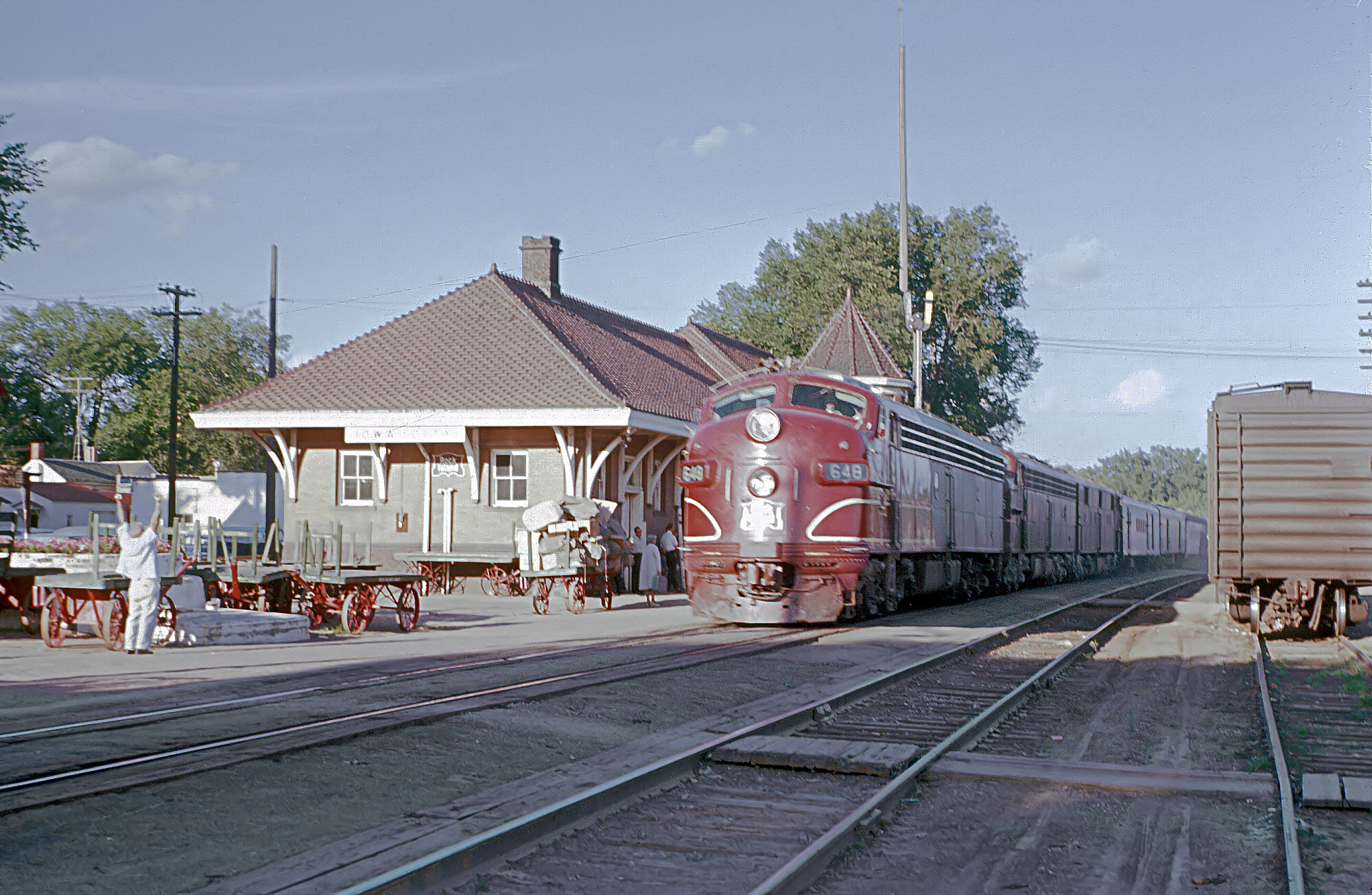
The Rocky Mountain Rocket at the station in July of 1963

Service included the CRI&P's Corn Belt Rocket and Rocky Mountain Rocket passenger lines. In the trains' final year there, the route was shortened to Chicago to Council Bluffs.

The depot ceased operations in 1970, although the railroad continued to maintain offices here. In 1982 (two years after the Rock Island ceased operations) it was acquired by a couple of attorneys for their offices. It was listed on the National Register of Historic Places the same year. The building sits adjacent to the Iowa Interstate Railroad lines, and the railroad has operated occasional excursion trains that have stopped at the former depot.
