= Chicago, Rock Island and Pacific Railroad Stone Arch Viaduct =

- U.S. National Register of Historic Places
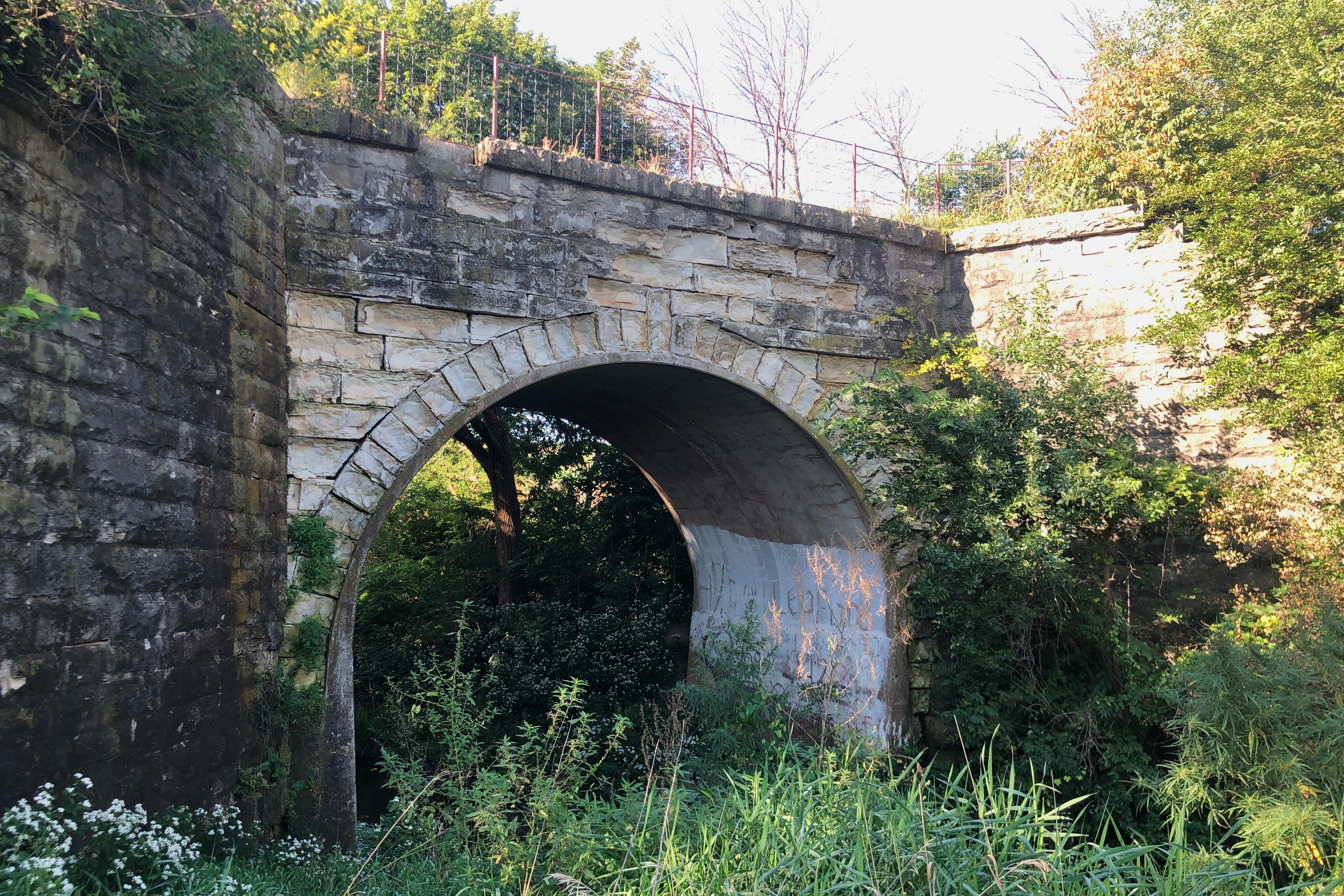
- Chicago, Rock Island and Pacific Railroad Stone Arch Viaduct in 2025

- Location within Iowa Location within the United States
- Location: 0.5 miles northwest of the junction of Co. Rd. F66 and Hackberry Rd.
- Nearest city: Shelby, Iowa
- Coordinates: 41°31′26″N 95°26′12″W
- Area: less than one acre
- Built: 1868
- Architectural style: Arch bridge
- NRHP reference No.: 98000870
- Added to NRHP: July 15, 1998

The Chicago, Rock Island and Pacific Railroad Stone Arch Viaduct, also known as the Old Stone Arch, is located northeast of Shelby, Iowa, United States. The span carried the Chicago, Rock Island and Pacific Railroad tracks over Little Silver Creek. It measures 35 feet (11 m) from the water level to the deck, 20 feet (6.1 m) in width, and 30 feet (9.1 m) in length. The bridge has flanking wingwalls that measure 40 feet (12 m) in length. Limestone for the bridge was quarried near Earlham, Iowa and transported by train to the site. It is one of two such bridges known to exist in Shelby County. The Rock Island was the first railroad to enter the county, and continued to operate here into the 1950s. At that time they abandoned the line when the Atlantic cutoff was built providing a more direct route between Atlantic, Iowa and Council Bluffs. While the tracks were removed, the stone arch, the railroad grade, and the right-of-way were left intact. They are now part of the Rock Island Old Stone Arch Nature Trail. The bridge was listed on the National Register of Historic Places in 1998.
