= Union Depot (Grinnell, Iowa) =

Grinnell
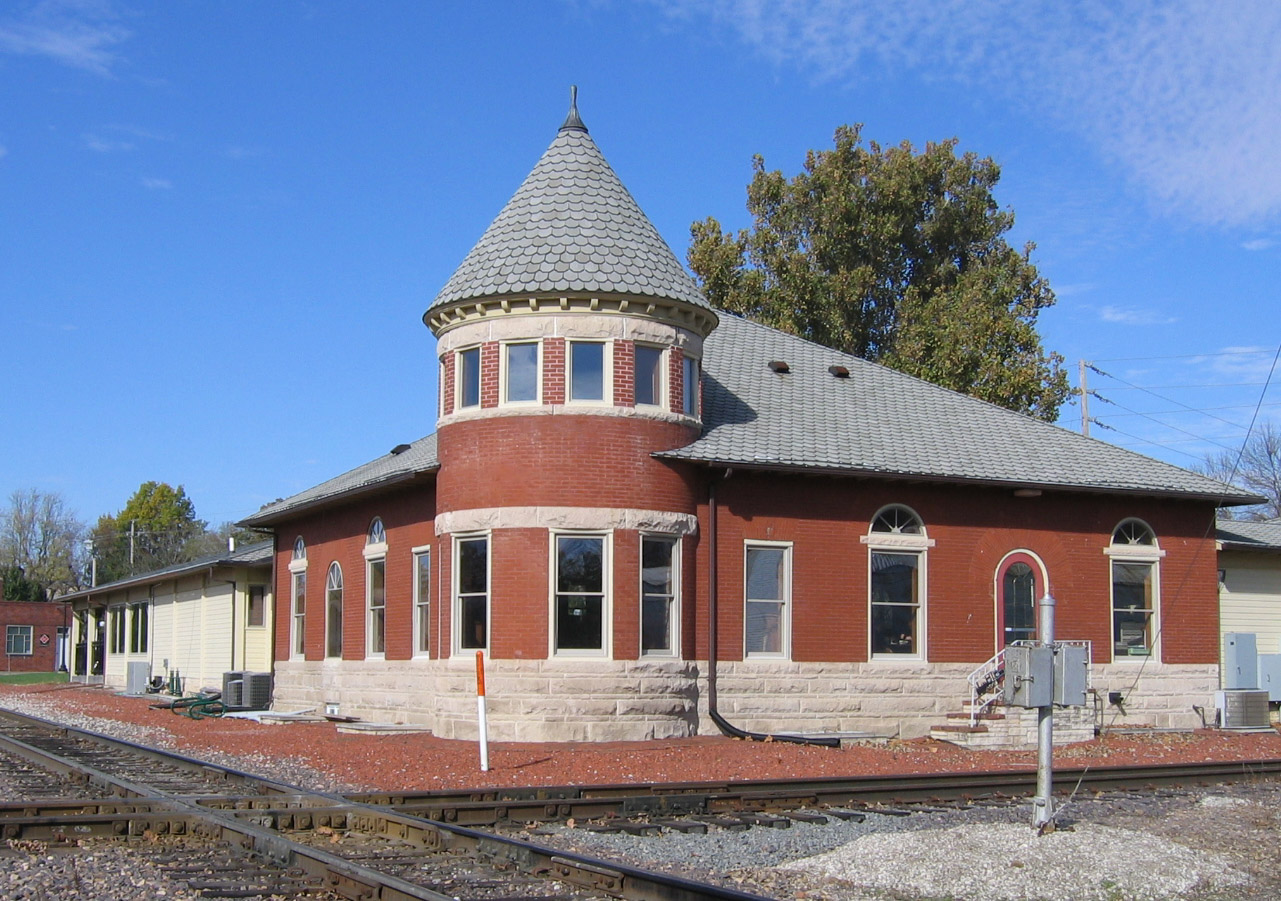
- Grinnell station in June 2006

General information
- Location: 1014 Third Avenue, Grinnell, Iowa 50112
- System: Former Rock Island Line passenger rail station

History
- Opened: 1863
- Closed: May 31, 1970
- Rebuilt: 1893

Former services
Preceding station	Chicago, Rock Island and Pacific Railroad	Following station
Kellogg toward Colorado Springs	Main Line	Malcom toward Chicago
- Union Depot
- U.S. National Register of Historic Places
- Location within Iowa Location within the United States
- Location: Park and State Sts. Grinnell, Iowa
- Coordinates: 41°44′28″N 92°43′17″W
- Area: less than one acre
- Built: 1893
- Built by: Chicago, Rock Island & Pacific Railroad
- NRHP reference No.: 76000805
- Added to NRHP: December 12, 1976
Location

Union Depot, also known as the Grinnell Union Depot, is an historic building located in Grinnell, Iowa, United States. The Chicago, Rock Island & Pacific Railroad built the first tracks through the area in 1863, and they built a simple frame depot the same year. The Central Railroad of Iowa extended its north–south line to Grinnell nine years later, and their tracks crossed the Rock Island tracks at this location. The Minneapolis and St. Louis Railway eventually acquired the Central Railroad. The old depot became too small and this one replaced it in 1893. It was designed by the Rock Island Lines and built by a local contractor. The one-story, brick structure follows a square plan with a round corner tower at the junction of the two tracks. The tower provided the station agent with a clear view in all directions.

Service included the CRI&P's Corn Belt Rocket and Rocky Mountain Rocket passenger lines. In the trains' final year there, the route was shortened to Chicago to Council Bluffs. Service ended on May 31, 1970; with the end of the Council Bluffs train.

The building now houses a restaurant. It was listed on the National Register of Historic Places in 1976.
