= Des Moines Rock Island Depot =

Des Moines
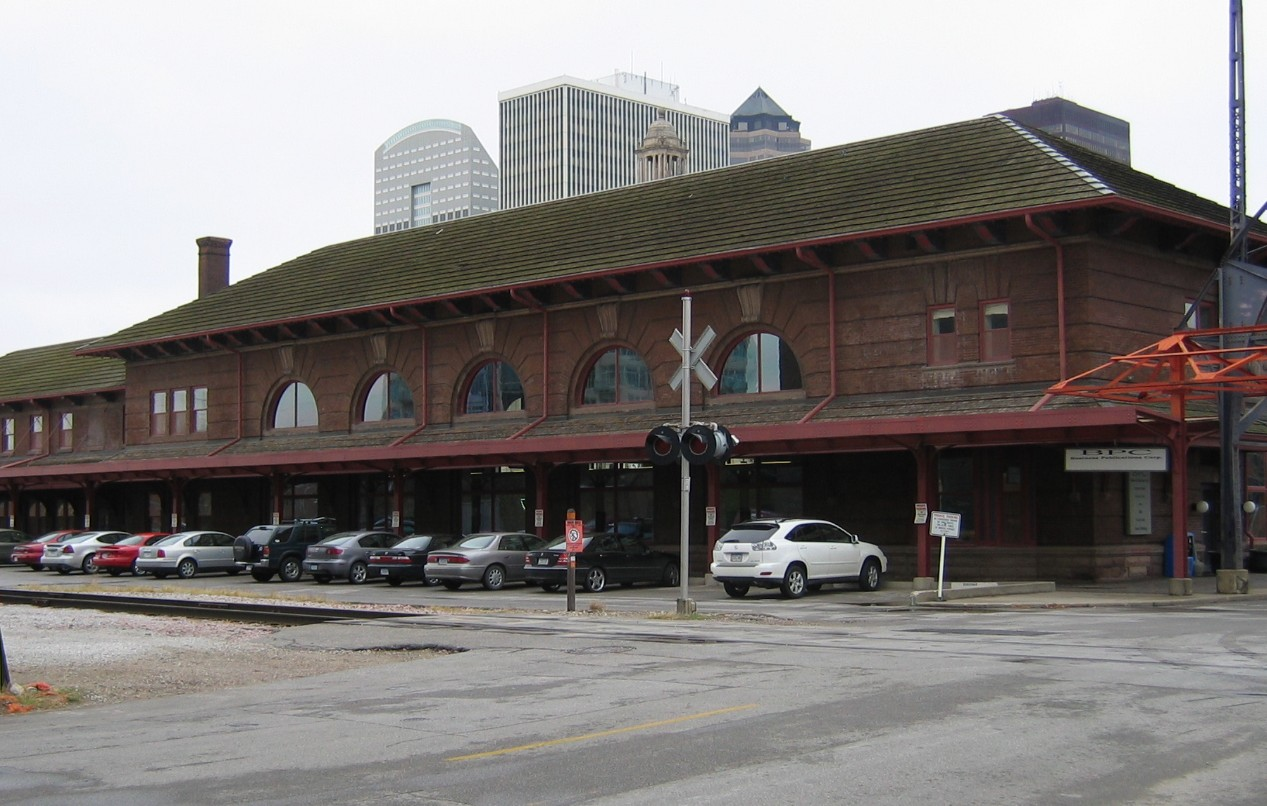
- The Rock Island Depot seen on October 26, 2006 at 1:41 PM, Central Daylight Time

General information
- Location: 107 Fourth Street, Des Moines, Iowa 50309
- Coordinates: 41°35′1.360″N 93°37′18.471″W
- System: Former Rock Island Line passenger rail station
- Line: Chicago, Rock Island and Pacific Railroad
- Platforms: 1 side platform, 1 island platform
- Tracks: 1 (formerly 4)

Construction
- Accessible: No
- Architectural style: Beaux-Arts

History
- Opened: 1901
- Closed: May 31, 1970
- Rebuilt: 1910

Former services
| Preceding station | Chicago, Rock Island and Pacific Railroad | Following station |
|---|---|---|
| Valley Junction toward Colorado Springs | Main Line | East Des Moines toward Chicago |
| Carlisle toward Teague | Teague – Minneapolis | East Des Moines toward Minneapolis |
| Terminus | Des Moines – Washington | East Des Moines toward Washington |
Location

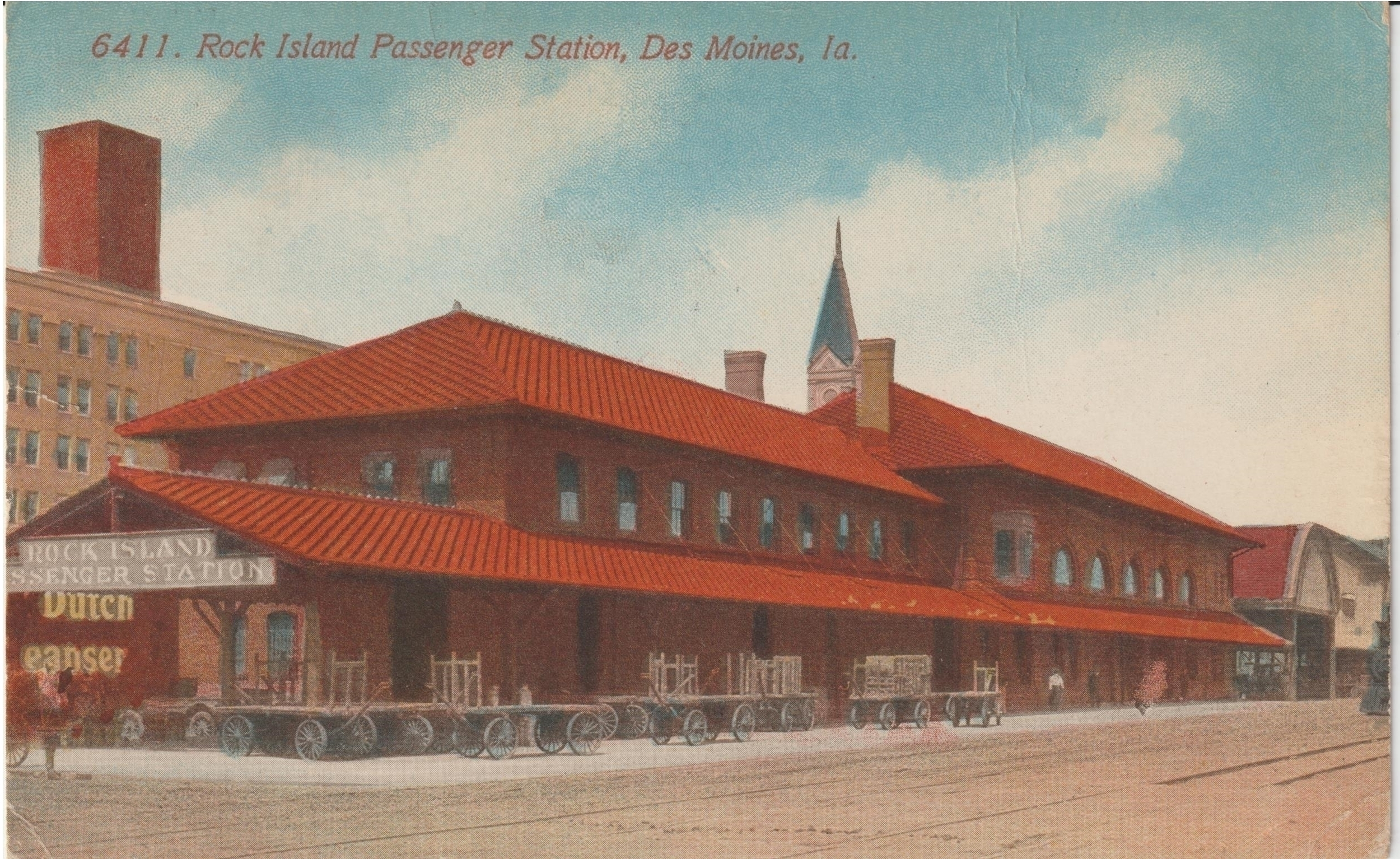
The Des Moines Rock Island Depot, view from the south, ca. 1910.

The Des Moines Rock Island Depot is a combination passenger and freight pair of buildings in the Beaux-Arts style in downtown Des Moines, Iowa. Construction of the Chicago, Rock Island and Pacific Railroad (Rock Island) passenger building was completed in 1901. The building is in the Civic Center Historic District, west of the Des Moines River. A covered freight platform and brick building added in 1910 on the east side of the pair of buildings. Des Moines Union Station, which served several other railroads, was located one block to the northwest.

An unusual aspect is that it spanned from one building at 107 Fourth Street to an older depot building at 108 Fourth Street, connecting across Fourth Street with a metal arch. The principal building, the passenger station, on the west side of Fourth Street, is a two story brick structure.

The depot was a presidential campaign stop for Herbert Hoover, Franklin D. Roosevelt, and Harry S. Truman.

== Passenger trains ==
A Pullman train at Des Moines Rock Island Depot, early 20th century

The station served Rock Island trains from the north to the south, and from the west to the east. In 1957 passenger trains included:

- multiple Rocket trains (Chicago – Davenport - Des Moines)
- Rocky Mountain Rocket (Chicago – Davenport - Colorado Springs, CO)
- Kansas City Rocket (Minneapolis-St. Paul – Kansas City)
- Twin Star Rocket (Minneapolis-St. Paul – Houston)

== Decline and modern use ==
By 1970, passenger service was a mere single train west (#7) to Council Bluffs and east (#10) to Chicago. Service ended on May 31, 1970; with the end of the Council Bluffs train. This was the last passenger train in Des Moines.

In 1986 the Douglas Wells architectural firm designed the restoration of the building. The western part was used for the Business Record offices, and the freight part, the eastern section, was restored for restaurant use.

The building remains intact today. However, the station-associated tracks, which in the past had been numerous, have been reduced to a single track farther from the station. The nearest passenger train service is in Osceola, 40 miles to the south, where Amtrak's California Zephyr makes a daily westbound and eastbound stop.

In 2023, it was reported that Connie Wimer, who has owned the building since the mid-1980s intended to sell it. The building had been serving as office space for Business Publications Corp., who relocated to a smaller space in Des Moines citing a shift away from in-office work.
