= East Union Depot (Des Moines, Iowa) =

Historic train depot in Des Moines, Iowa, U.S.

- U.S. Historic district – Contributing property
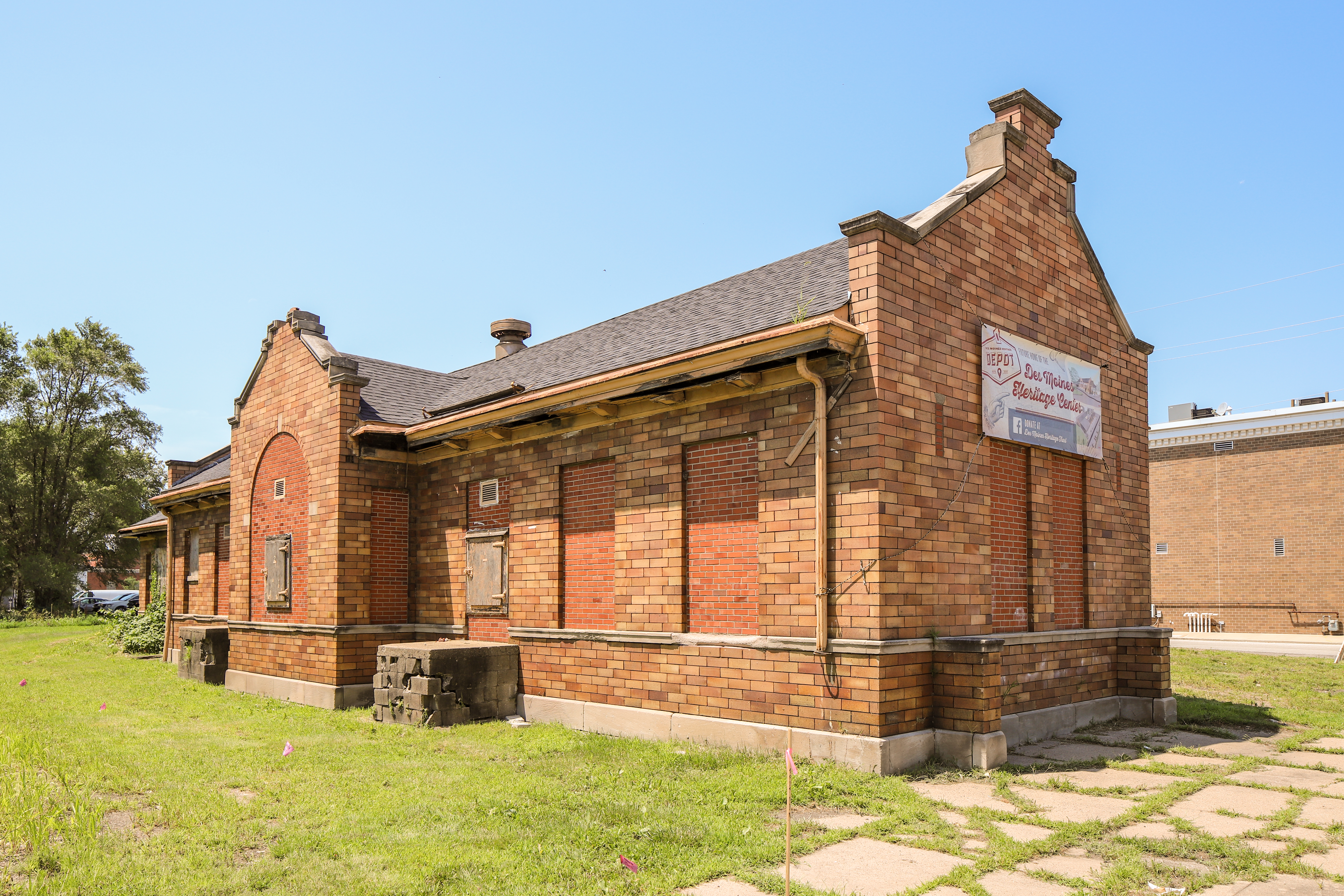
- East Des Moines Union Depot, view from the southeast c. 2019

- Location within Iowa Location within the United States
- Location: E. 5th St, Des Moines, Iowa
- Coordinates: 41.5866°N 93.6104°W
- Built: 1909
- Architectural style: Late Victorian
- Part of: East Des Moines Commercial Historic District (ID100003523)
- Designated CP: March 22, 2019

The East Des Moines Union Depot is in a Dutch Revival style in the Market District of Des Moines, Iowa. Construction of the East Des Moines Union Depot was completed in 1909. The building is in the East Village Historic District, east of the Des Moines River. The depot was built by William H. Brereton for the Des Moines Union Railway, and served the Wabash Railroad, Chicago Great Western Railway, Chicago, Burlington and Quincy Railroad, and the Des Moines, Iowa Falls and Northern Railway. The building operated as a depot until the 1950s when it was sold and converted to cold storage for tomatoes. In 2017 the building was purchased by The Des Moines Heritage Trust which completed a $4 million renovation in 2021.

Preceding station	Burlington Route	Following station
Des Moines Terminus	Des Moines – Albia	Clarkson toward Albia
Preceding station	Chicago Great Western Railway	Following station
Des Moines toward Kansas City	Main Line	Norwoodville toward Minneapolis
Preceding station	Wabash Railroad	Following station
Des Moines Terminus	Des Moines – Moberly	Hastie toward Moberly
