= Rocky Mountain Rocket =

1939 to 1966 US passenger train

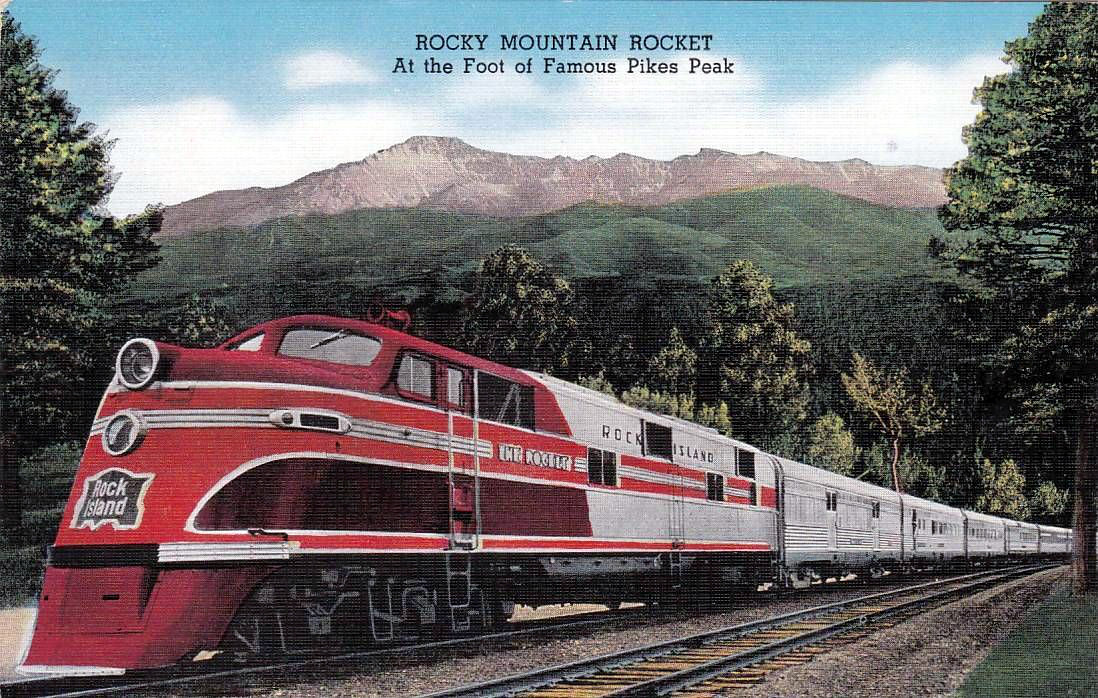
- The Rocky Mountain Rocket in 1942

Overview
- Status: Discontinued
- Predecessor: Rocky Mountain Limited
- First service: November 12, 1939
- Last service: October 15, 1966
- Successor: Quad Cities Rocket
- Former operator: Chicago, Rock Island and Pacific Railroad

Route
- Termini: Chicago, Illinois; Denver, Colorado
- Stops: 23 intermediate stops (westbound), 21 intermediate stops (eastbound)
- Distance travelled: 1,083 miles (1,743 km)
- Average journey time: 19 hours 30 minutes (westbound); 18 hours 50 minutes (eastbound)
- Service frequency: Daily
- Train numbers: 7 (westbound), 8 (eastbound)

On-board services
- Seating arrangements: Coach
- Sleeping arrangements: Sections, roomettes, double bedrooms, compartments
- Catering facilities: Dining car-cocktail lounge Stewardess-nurse service
- Observation facilities: Buffet lounge with radio

The Rocky Mountain Rocket was a streamlined passenger train of the Chicago, Rock Island and Pacific Railroad. Rock Island's train numbers 7 and 8 ran between Chicago's LaSalle Street Station and Denver's Union Station and Colorado Springs, Colorado. The Rocky Mountain Rocket ran from 1939 to 1966; the train was discontinued prior to the creation of Amtrak in 1971.

== History ==
The Rock Island was one of several railroads competing in the Chicago–Denver passenger market. The Chicago, Burlington and Quincy Railroad started the streamliner era in the United States in 1934 when its Pioneer Zephyr made its special "Dawn-to-Dusk" run from Denver to Chicago in 13 hours 5 minutes. By 1936 both the Burlington's Denver Zephyr and the Union Pacific Railroad's City of Denver were locked in head-to-head competition, each with new equipment and a 16-hour schedule. The Rock Island's offering was the Rocky Mountain Limited, operating traditional heavyweight cars on a 27-hour schedule.

Although mired in bankruptcy, the Rock Island introduced six new streamlined trainsets, known as "Rockets", in 1936. Pleased with the results, the Rock Island bought two new sets of streamlined equipment for Chicago–Denver train. The new train, christened, the Rocky Mountain Rocket, entered service on November 12, 1939. In contrast to the Rocky Mountain Limited, the Rocket required only twenty hours. A section split off at Limon, Colorado to serve Colorado Springs. At the time the Rocket was the only train that offered a one-seat ride between Chicago and Colorado Springs. The new train was profitable, despite the slower running time compared to the Burlington and UP streamliners. Further competition arrived in 1942, when the Missouri Pacific Railroad and Denver and Rio Grande Western Railroad introduced the Colorado Eagle between St. Louis, Missouri, and Denver.

Facing steep competition from airlines and improved highways, the Rocky Mountain Rocket lost its sleeping and dining cars in July 1965. Snack cars were added to replace the diners and remained in service until the train was discontinued 15 months later. The last train ran on October 16, 1966. Among its final passengers was the railfan and photographer Otto Perry. Unnamed train numbers 7 and 8 continued to operate between Chicago and Omaha, but the name was gone, along with all Rock Island passenger service west of Omaha. After a year without a name, it was renamed The Cornhusker. In 1970, the train was renamed the Quad Cities Rocket after its western terminus was cut all the way back to Rock Island, Illinois. The train continued in this truncated form alongside the once-proud Rock Island's other remaining passenger train, the Peoria Rocket, after the formation of Amtrak. From 1971 onward, Illinois provided subsidies for the train. By this time, it was down to just two coaches. What remained of the train made its last run on December 31, 1978.

== Route ==
In 1942 the Rocky Mountain Rocket ran on a 19.5 hour schedule from Denver to Chicago. An extra quarter-hour was required for the Colorado Springs Section. At Limon, Colorado, the Rocket was split on its westbound run. The bulk of the train went northwest to Denver on the Union Pacific's main line (ex-Kansas Pacific) to Denver, while the rest of the train continued on Rock Island tracks southwest to Colorado Springs. Eastbound, the train was combined at Limon and split in Belleville, Kansas, with one section continuing to Union Station, Kansas City, Missouri, while the other section went to Chicago.

== Equipment ==
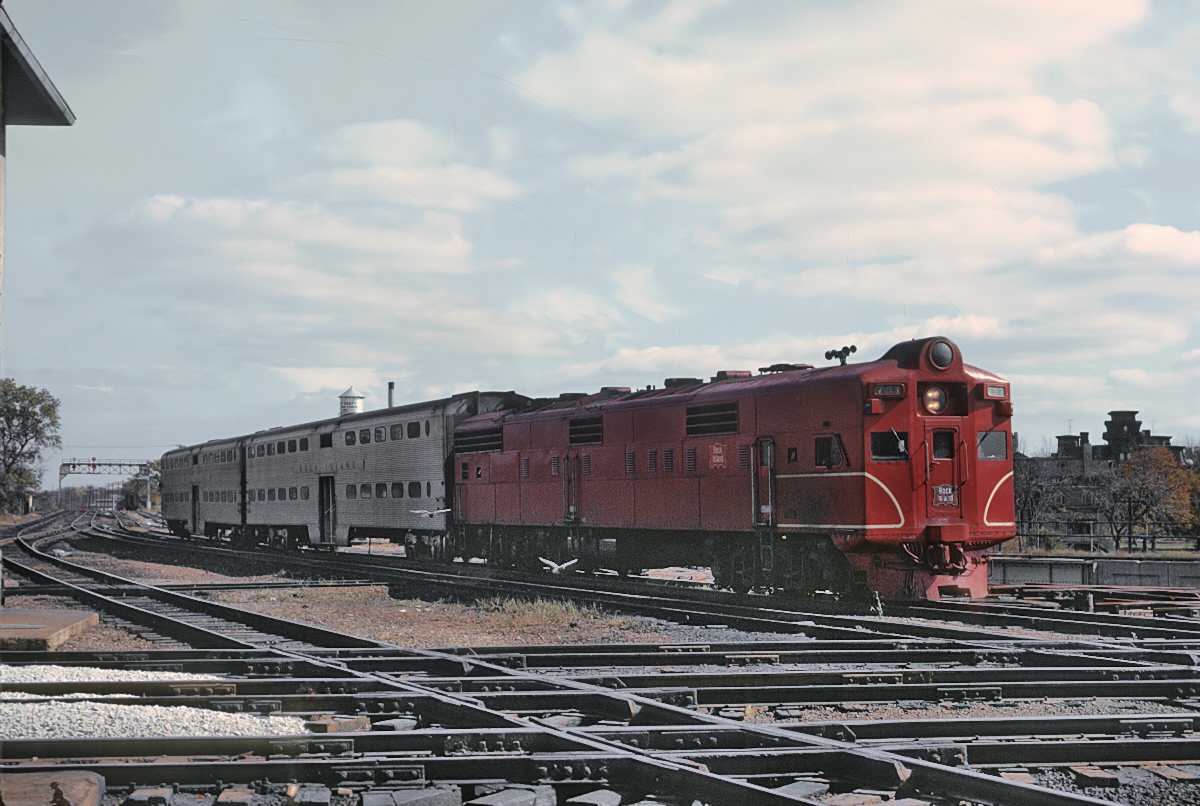
Rock Island AB6 No. 751 in commuter service in 1966

Both Budd and Pullman-Standard contributed cars to the inaugural equipment sets used by the Rocky Mountain Rocket. Each of the two equipment sets comprised a baggage car, 44-seat post office-coach, 52-seat coach, diner-lounge, two sleeping cars, and a sleeper-observation car. Budd built the baggage cars, coaches, and dining cars. The diner-lounge could seat 32 patrons in the main dining, plus 14 in a cocktail lounge. The car included a kitchen and pantry. Pullman-Standard built the sleeping cars and sleeper-observation car. The first sleeping car contained eight sections, two compartments, and two double bedrooms. The second contained ten sections and four roomettes. The sleeper-observation contained five bedrooms toward the front of the car, followed by a small lounge and round-end observation area.

The motive power for the Rocket was unusual. The Rock Island assigned an EMC E6 and EMC AB6 to haul the train. The AB6s, unique to the Rock Island and this route, were flat-fronted, similar to a B unit, but with a cab and capable of independent operation. It could operate behind an A unit without ruining the streamlined profile of the train, but then pull the Colorado Springs section after the separation in Limon.
