= National Register of Historic Places listings in Benton County, Iowa =

Location of Benton County in Iowa

This is a list of the National Register of Historic Places listings in Benton County, Iowa.

This is intended to be a complete list of the properties and districts on the National Register of Historic Places in Benton County, Iowa, United States. Latitude and longitude coordinates are provided for many National Register properties and districts; these locations may be seen together in a map.

There are 16 properties listed on the National Register in the county, and one former listing.

This National Park Service list is complete through NPS recent listings posted December 12, 2025.

	Name on the Register	Image	Date listed	Location	City or town	Description
1	Belle Plaine Main Street Historic District	Belle Plaine Main Street Historic District	October 16, 2013 (#13000828)	Roughly bounded by 7th & 9th Avenues and 11th & 13th Streets; 41°53′47″N 92°16′36″W	Belle Plaine	
2	Benton County Courthouse	Benton County Courthouse	October 8, 1976 (#76000733)	E. 4th St. 42°10′05″N 92°01′25″W	Vinton	Beaux Arts Renaissance classicism style 1905 County Courthouse.
3	Burlington, Cedar Rapids & Northern Passenger Station-Vinton	Burlington, Cedar Rapids & Northern Passenger Station-Vinton	December 6, 1990 (#90001852)	612 2nd Ave. 42°09′55″N 92°01′19″W	Vinton	1900 stone and brick depot with marble floor tiles and oak wood work. Within 3 years, became a part of the Rock Island line, also known as the Chicago, Rock Island and Pacific Railroad.
4	Central Vinton Residential Historic District	Central Vinton Residential Historic District	November 21, 2012 (#12000948)	Roughly bounded by 2nd & D Aves., W. 13th & W. 6th Sts. 42°09′45″N 92°01′34″W	Vinton	Historic residential district representing the largest intact collection of contiguous mid-nineteenth to mid-twentieth century dwellings in Vinton. Most dwellings have not been significantly altered. The district also contains three churches built prior to 1955 which are included as contributing for their architectural significance.
5	Herring Hotel	Herring Hotel	December 31, 2008 (#08001250)	718 13th St. 41°53′49″N 92°16′35″W	Belle Plaine	Built in 1900, this once prominent hotel was a version of the so-called "one-stop" along the Lincoln Highway where travelers could find lodging, food, entertainment, and service for their cars.
6	Iowa Canning Company Seed House Building	Iowa Canning Company Seed House Building	March 12, 2012 (#12000094)	201 1st Ave. 42°10′10″N 92°01′29″W	Vinton	
7	James Greer McQuilkin Round Barn		June 30, 1986 (#86001414)	Off County Road D65; 42°16′06″N 92°16′49″W	Bruce Township	Clay tile exterior round barn, classified as an Iowa Agricultural Experiment Station.
8	Preston’s Station Historic District	Preston’s Station Historic District	September 21, 2020 (#100005572)	402 4th Ave. 41°53′14″N 92°16′59″W	Belle Plaine	
9	Frank G. Ray House & Carriage House	Frank G. Ray House & Carriage House	December 10, 1982 (#82000403)	912 1st Ave. 42°09′44″N 92°01′26″W	Vinton	Late Victorian Queen Anne style home, built for the secretary of the Iowa Canning Company, Frank G. Ray. Property is also known as Ray Towers.
10	Round Barn, Bruce Township Section 3		June 30, 1986 (#86001415)	County Road D56; 42°17′31″N 92°14′08″W	Bruce Township	
11	Sankot Motor Company	Sankot Motor Company	July 28, 1995 (#95000558)	807 13th St. 41°53′49″N 92°16′32″W	Belle Plaine	
12	Shellsburg Bridge		June 25, 1998 (#98000770)	Pearl St. over Bear Creek; 42°05′36″N 91°52′10″W	Shellsburg	
13	Upper Stone Schoolhouse		July 7, 1983 (#83000340)	East of Vinton; 42°10′28″N 91°53′29″W	Vinton	
14	Vinton Public Library	Vinton Public Library	May 23, 1983 (#83000341)	510 2nd Ave. 42°09′58″N 92°01′20″W	Vinton	
15	Youngville Cafe	Youngville Cafe	February 1, 2007 (#06001321)	2409 73rd St. 41°57′57″N 92°01′32″W	Watkins	
16	Frank E. and Katie (Cherveny) Zalesky House	Frank E. and Katie (Cherveny) Zalesky House	April 10, 2012 (#12000191)	802 9th Ave. 41°53′33″N 92°16′31″W	Belle Plaine	

== Former listings ==
	Name on the Register	Image	Date listed	Date removed	Location	City or town	Description
1	Round Barn, Bruce Township Section 6		June 30, 1986 (#86001416)	May 28, 2019	West of U.S. Route 218; 42°17′13″N 92°16′50″W	Bruce Township	

== See also ==
- List of National Historic Landmarks in Iowa
- National Register of Historic Places listings in Iowa
- Listings in neighboring counties: Black Hawk, Buchanan, Iowa, Linn, Tama
