= Cedar Rapids Union Station =

Former train station in Cedar Rapids, Iowa, US

Cedar Rapids
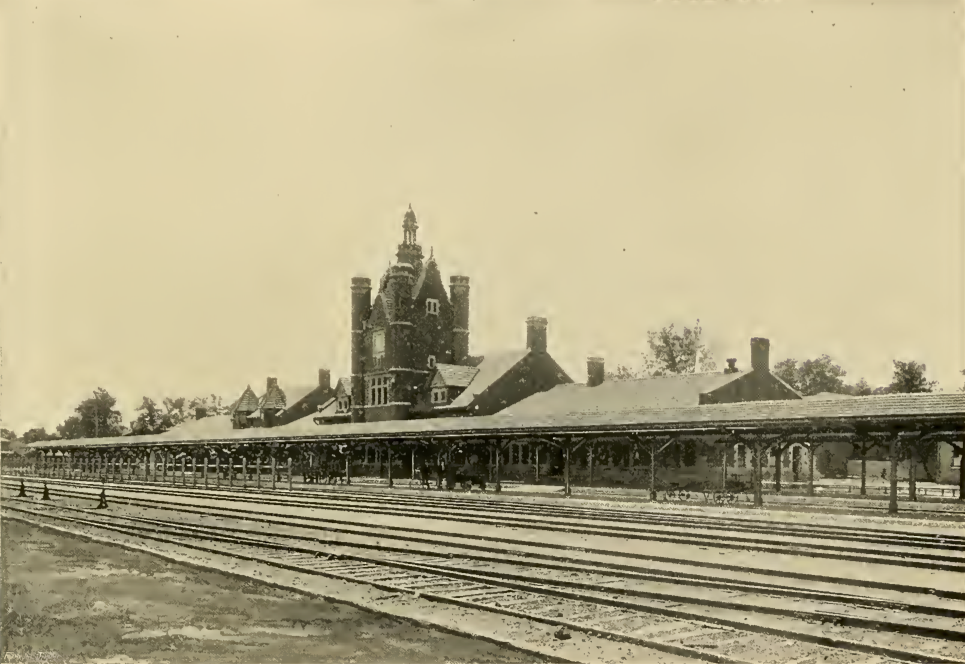
- Union Station c. 1898

General information
- Location: Cedar Rapids, Iowa

History
- Opened: 1897
- Closed: 1961

Former services
Preceding station	Chicago and North Western Railway	Following station
Luzerne toward Omaha	Main Line	Mount Vernon, IA toward Chicago
Preceding station	Chicago, Rock Island and Pacific Railroad	Following station
Palo toward Minneapolis	Burlington, Cedar Rapids and Northern Railway	Ely, IA toward Burlington
Vinton toward Watertown	Watertown – Cedar Rapids	Terminus
Terminus	Cedar Rapids – Decorah	Linn toward Decorah

The Cedar Rapids Union Station served different railroads' passenger operations for six decades. The structure at 4th Street and 4th Avenue SE, Cedar Rapids, was opened with fanfare in 1897 with a gala for Cedar Rapids' charities. The station was 600 feet long with gargoyles. The interior of the main building was 40 by 400 feet and 27 feet high.

The station served the Chicago and North Western Railroad and the Rock Island Railroad, as such, it was a hub for trains from Minneapolis, Chicago, Omaha, St. Louis, Kansas City, Denver, Portland and the Oakland/San Francisco market. Additionally, Railway Post Office rail cars were handled at the station.

Cedar Rapids was accompanied by another railroad station, the Milwaukee Depot on 1st Avenue SE, serving trains of the Milwaukee Road and the Illinois Central.

In its later years service declined. In 1955, the Union Pacific Railroad changed its partner for the eastern leg of West Coast – Chicago trips from Chicago and North Western to the Milwaukee Road. As such, several trains were shifted over to the Milwaukee Road's station at Marion, a town on the northeastern periphery of Cedar Rapids. In 1957, two executives from the Chicago & North Western Railroad visited the station, decided that it was obsolete and moved to have it replaced. It was demolished in 1961 and replaced by a smaller structure. Amtrak took over intercity rail in the United States in 1971 and Cedar Rapids has not been served since.

Major named trains at mid-twentieth century were:

- Chicago & North Western:

All these trains routed out of Des Moines in 1955, as these routes were switched to Milwaukee Road, to Marion on the outskirts of the city.

  - Challenger Streamliner* – Chicago – Los Angeles
  - City of Denver* – Chicago – Denver
  - City of Los Angeles* – Chicago – Los Angeles
  - City of Portland* – Chicago – Portland
  - City of San Francisco* – Chicago – San Francisco
  - Gold Coast – Chicago – San Francisco
  - L.A. Challenger – Chicago – Los Angeles
  - Overland Limited – Chicago – San Francisco
  - Pacific Limited – Chicago – San Francisco
  - San Francisco Challenger – Chicago – San Francisco

The above trains marked * persisted as Milwaukee Rd trains to 1971, albeit to Marion.

- Rock Island:
  - Zephyr Rocket – Minneapolis – St. Louis

This was last named Rock Island train, serving Cedar Rapids until 1967. In the last years of service an unnamed train making the same route & local trains from Cedar Rapids to various parts of the state.
