= Burlington Cedar Rapids and Northern Depot =

Burlington Cedar Rapids and Northern Depot may refer to any railway station on the Burlington, Cedar Rapids and Northern Railway including:

- Burlington, Cedar Rapids and Northern Railroad Passenger Station (Clarion, Iowa), listed on the National Register of Historic Places in Wright County, Iowa
- Burlington, Cedar Rapids & Northern Passenger Depot-Dows, Iowa, listed on the National Register of Historic Places in Wright County, Iowa
- Burlington Cedar Rapids and Northern Depot (Pipestone, Minnesota), listed on the National Register of Historic Places in Pipestone County, Minnesota

== See also ==
- Burlington Station (disambiguation)
