= Burlington Northern Depot =

Burlington Northern Depot or Burlington Northern Station may refer to:

Any one of many former train stations on the Burlington Northern Railroad, including:

in the United States (by state then city)

- Sandpoint Burlington Northern Railway Station, Sandpoint, Idaho, listed on the NRHP in Bonner County, Idaho
- Burlington Northern Depot (Detroit Lakes, Minnesota), listed on the National Register of Historic Places listings in Becker County, Minnesota
- Burlington Northern Depot (Beatrice, Nebraska), listed on the National Register of Historic Places in Gage County, Nebraska
- Burlington Northern Depot (Amenia, North Dakota), listed on the National Register of Historic Places in Cass County, North Dakota
- Burlington Northern Depot (Chehalis, Washington), listed on the National Register of Historic Places in Lewis County, Washington

== See also ==
- Burlington Station (disambiguation)
- Burlington Cedar Rapids and Northern Depot (disambiguation)
