= Oasis, Iowa =

- Unincorporated community
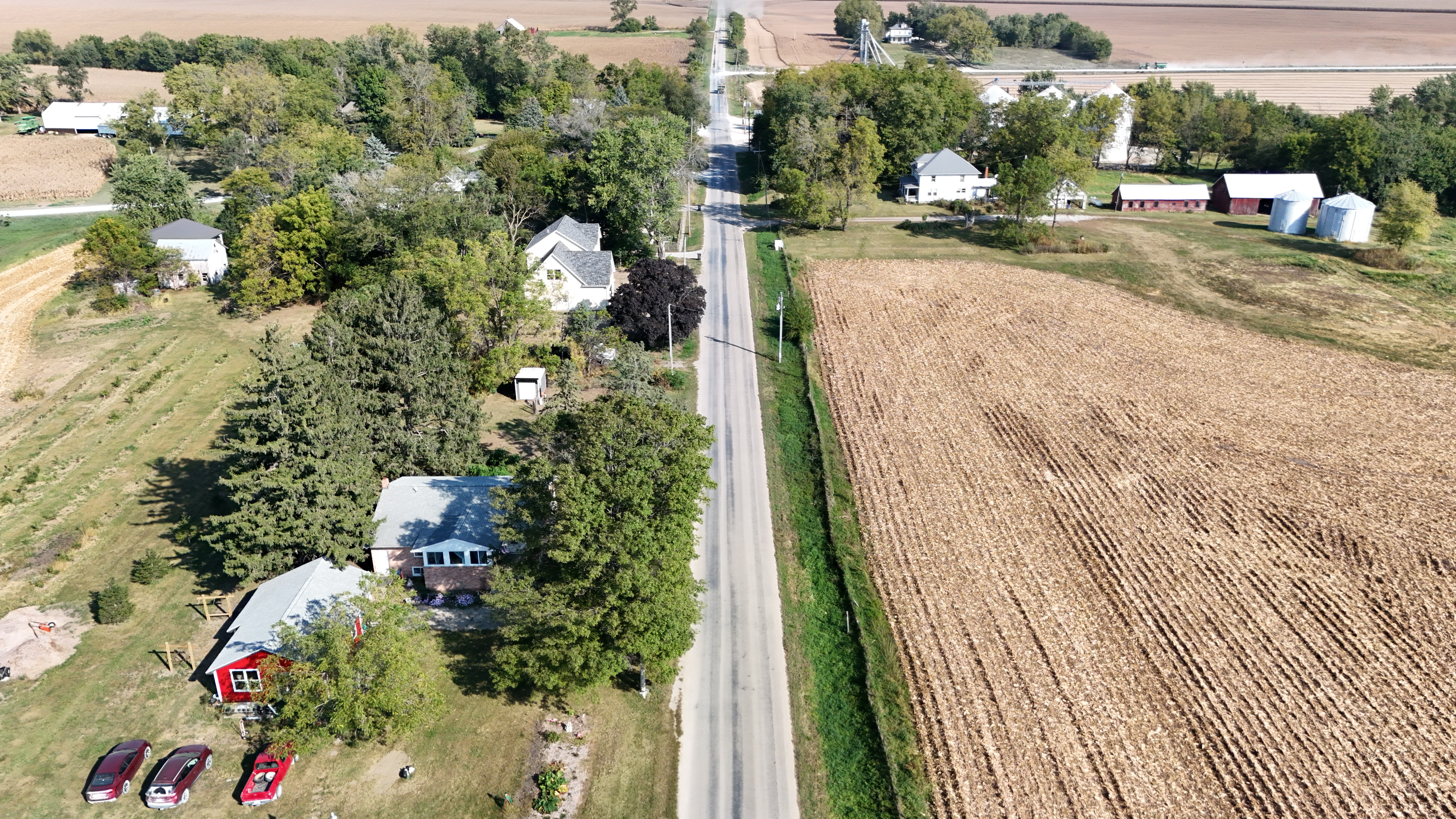
- Oasis, looking north along Oasis Road

- Location within Iowa Location within the United States
- Coordinates: 41°42′22″N 91°23′08″W
- Country: United States
- State: Iowa
- County: Johnson
- Elevation: 801 ft (244 m)
- Time zone: UTC-6 (Central (CST))
  - Summer (DST): UTC-5 (CDT)
- Area code: 319
- GNIS feature ID: 464679

Oasis is an unincorporated community located in Johnson County, Iowa, United States. It is within section 26 of Graham Township, and was once known as Graham, Iowa. It is part of the Iowa City, Iowa Metropolitan Statistical Area.

As of 2005, the town had a total population of approximately 20. It contains several homes, a cemetery, and a functioning grain elevator. It was once a stop on the Burlington, Cedar Rapids and Northern Railway, later the CRI&P, whose bed has now become the Hoover Nature Trail which runs from Oasis to West Branch. West of town is the Oasis Cemetery. Oasis once featured a sign that greeted visitors, but it disappeared.

== History ==
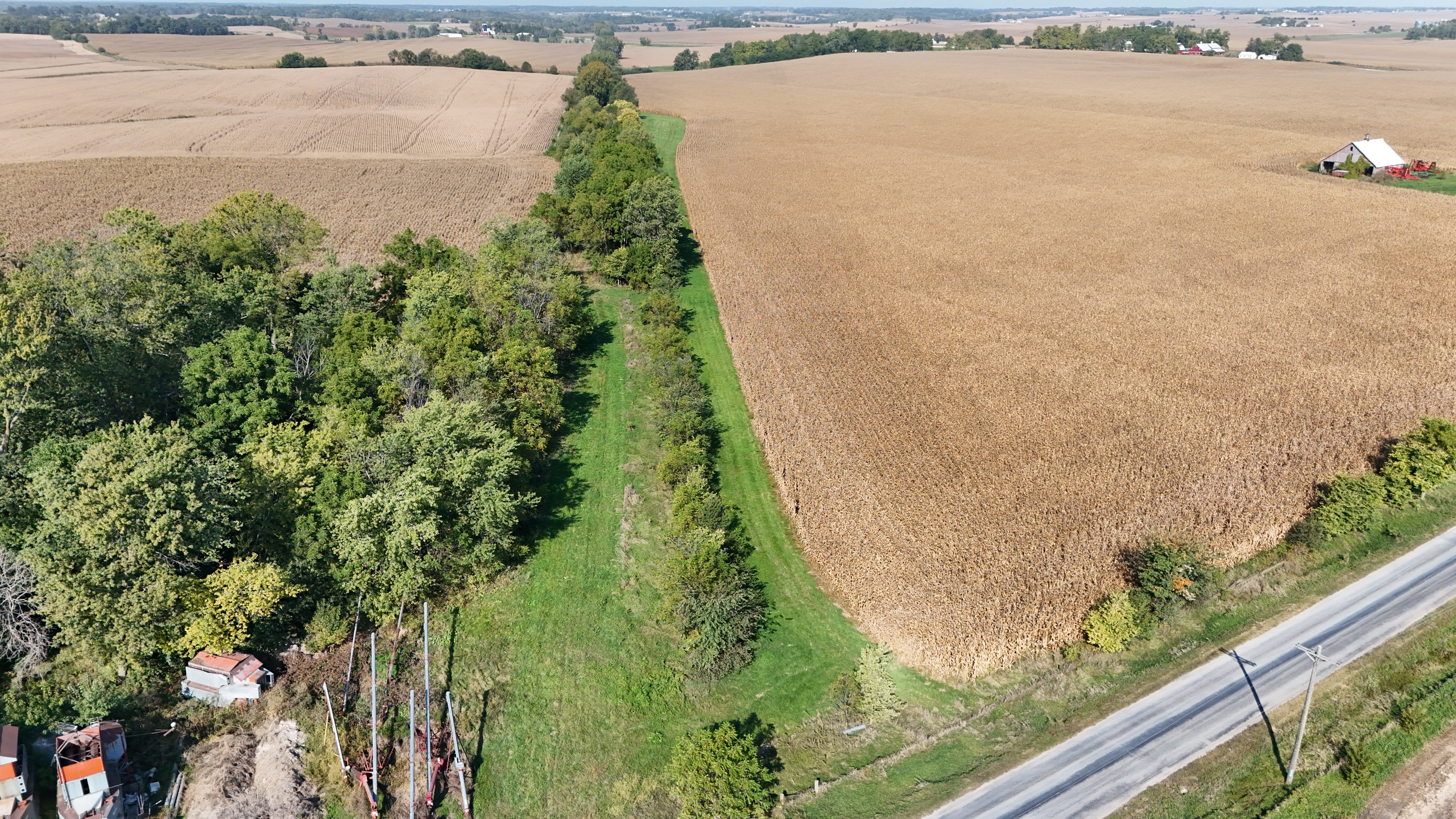
The Herbert Hoover Nature Trail heading west out of Oasis

The Oasis Post Office operated from 1864 until 1871, when its name was changed to Graham; however the name changed back later in 1871, and the post office was then operational until 1920.

William Jayne, the first settler in Graham Township, arrived in 1840 and owned land in Oasis, as did his brother Dr David Jayne of "Jayne Patent Medicine" fame. William's eldest son, also named William Jayne, died on 16 March 1897, and is buried in the Oasis Cemetery. His father died in 1880 and is buried in the Oakland Cemetery in Iowa City, along with his wife Maria, the younger William's two brothers John and David, and sister Elizabeth. John's wife and their son Eben, Eben's wife Gertrude, and their three children Geraldine, Katheryne and John (with his wife Helen) are also buried in the Oakland Cemetery.

Oasis' population was 130 in 1902, and was 115 in 1925. The population was 12 in 1940.
