= Burlington station =

Burlington Station or Burlington Depot may refer to:

== Current stations ==
- Burlington GO Station, Ontario
- Burlington Depot (Ottumwa, Iowa)
- Burlington Station (Hastings, Nebraska)
- Burlington station (Iowa)
- Burlington station (North Carolina)
- Union Station (Burlington, Vermont), served by the Ethan Allen Express
- Essex Junction station in Essex Junction, Vermont, also serving the Burlington, Vermont area, served by the Vermonter

== Historic stations ==
- Burlington Depot (Bellevue, Nebraska)
- Burlington Station (Omaha, Nebraska)
- Burlington Depot (Red Cloud, Nebraska)
- Burlington station (Southern Railway), in Burlington, North Carolina

== See also ==
- Burlington Northern Depot (disambiguation)
- Burlington Cedar Rapids and Northern Depot (disambiguation)
