= Burlington, Cedar Rapids, and Northern Railroad-Rock Rapids Station, Railroad Track and Bridge =

Historic district in Iowa, United States

Rock Rapids
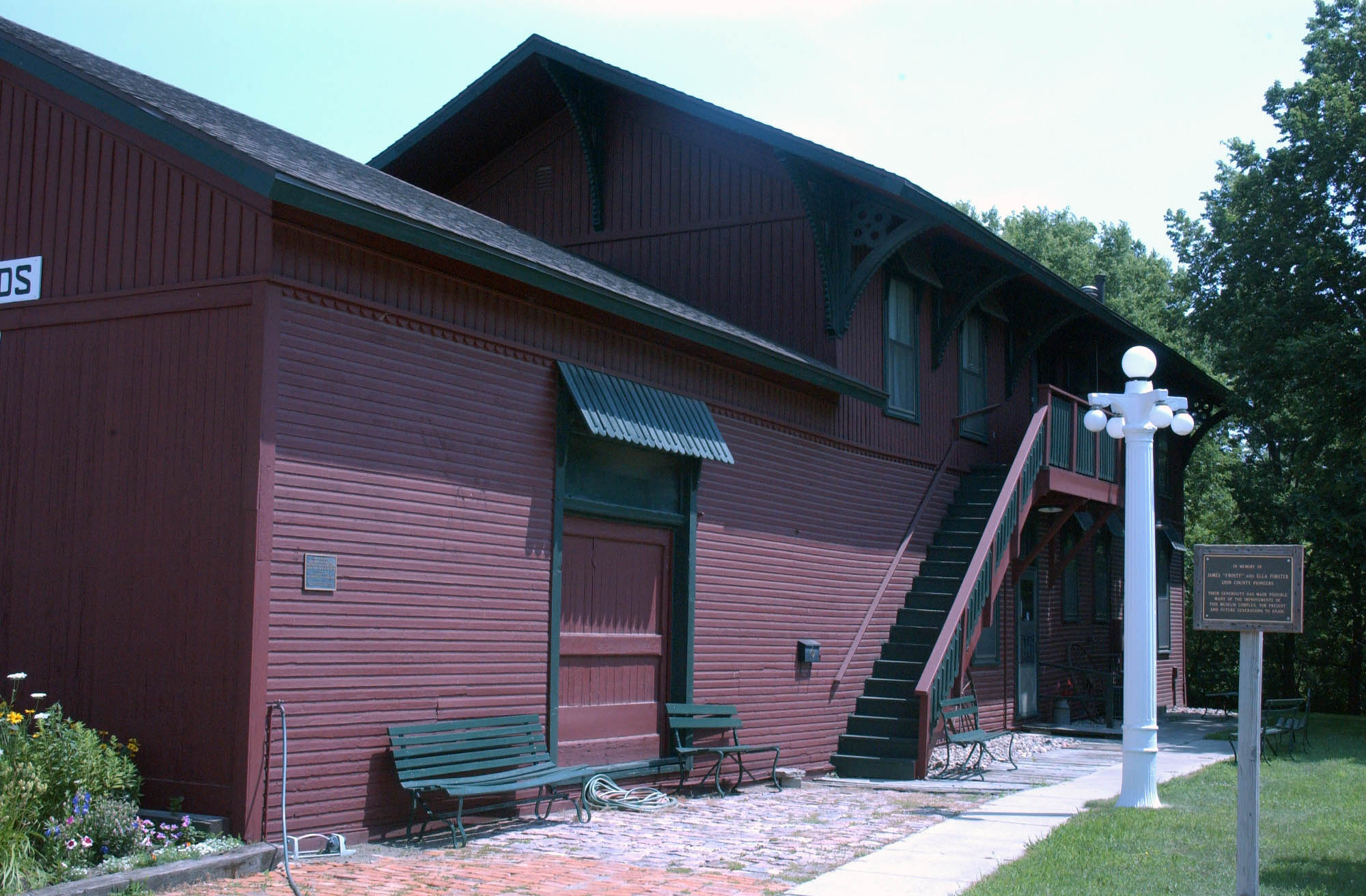
- The station in April 2005.

General information
- Location: 255–399 North Story Street, Rock Rapids, Iowa 51246
- System: Former Rock Island Line passenger station
- Platforms: 1

History
- Opened: 1886

Former services
Preceding station	Chicago, Rock Island and Pacific Railroad	Following station
Lester toward Sioux Falls	Sioux Falls – Ellsworth	Midland toward Ellsworth
- Burlington, Cedar Rapids, and Northern Railroad-Rock Rapids Station, Railroad Track and Bridge
- U.S. National Register of Historic Places
- U.S. Historic district
- Location within Iowa Location within the United States
- Location: N. Story St. Rock Rapids, Iowa
- Coordinates: 43°26′01″N 96°10′01″W
- Area: less than one acre
- Built: 1886
- Built by: Cedar Rapids, Iowa Falls and Northwestern Railway
- NRHP reference No.: 76000783
- Added to NRHP: November 7, 1976
Location

The Burlington, Cedar Rapids, and Northern Railroad-Rock Rapids Station, Railroad Track and Bridge is a nationally recognized historic district located in Rock Rapids, Iowa, United States. It was listed on the National Register of Historic Places in 1976. At the time of its nomination the district included one contributing building and three contributing structures.

The railroad did not come to Lyon County until 1885 when the Burlington, Cedar Rapids and Northern Railway (BCR&N) proposed to construct a line between Little Rock, Iowa and Sioux Falls, South Dakota via Rock Rapids. The county and local citizens promised financial support, and the line was completed the following year. The Cedar Rapids, Iowa Falls and Northwestern Railway, which was affiliated with the BCR&N, laid the track and built the structures. The depot is a one and two-story frame building. The decorative treatment of the exterior of building is in the Stick style. The single story section was used as a warehouse. Bridge No. 2834 is a 550 feet (170 m) structure, and features a horizontal circular curve. The Plate girder bridge is nine spans in length. The eastern two spans cross the main channel of the Rock River, the interior six spans cross Island Park, and the western span crosses the west branch of the Rock River. Just to the north of the depot is a hand switch along the tracks (date unknown).

The BCR&N was succeeded by the Chicago, Rock Island and Pacific Railroad, who then took over these facilities. The Lyon County Historical Society has owned the depot since 1973, and operates it as a museum. The Rock Island Line operated the tracks into the mid-1970s, when they were abandoned.
