= Amenia station =

Amenia station could refer to:

- Amenia station (New York), a former train station in Amenia, New York
- Amenia station (North Dakota), a historic train station in Amenia, North Dakota
