= Burlington Railroad (disambiguation) =

Burlington Railroad most commonly refers to the Chicago, Burlington and Quincy Railroad.

Burlington Railroad may also refer to:

- Burlington, Cedar Rapids and Northern Railway
- Burlington and Missouri River Railroad
- Burlington Northern Railroad
