= Burlington, Cedar Rapids and Northern Railroad Passenger Station (Clarion, Iowa) =

- U.S. National Register of Historic Places
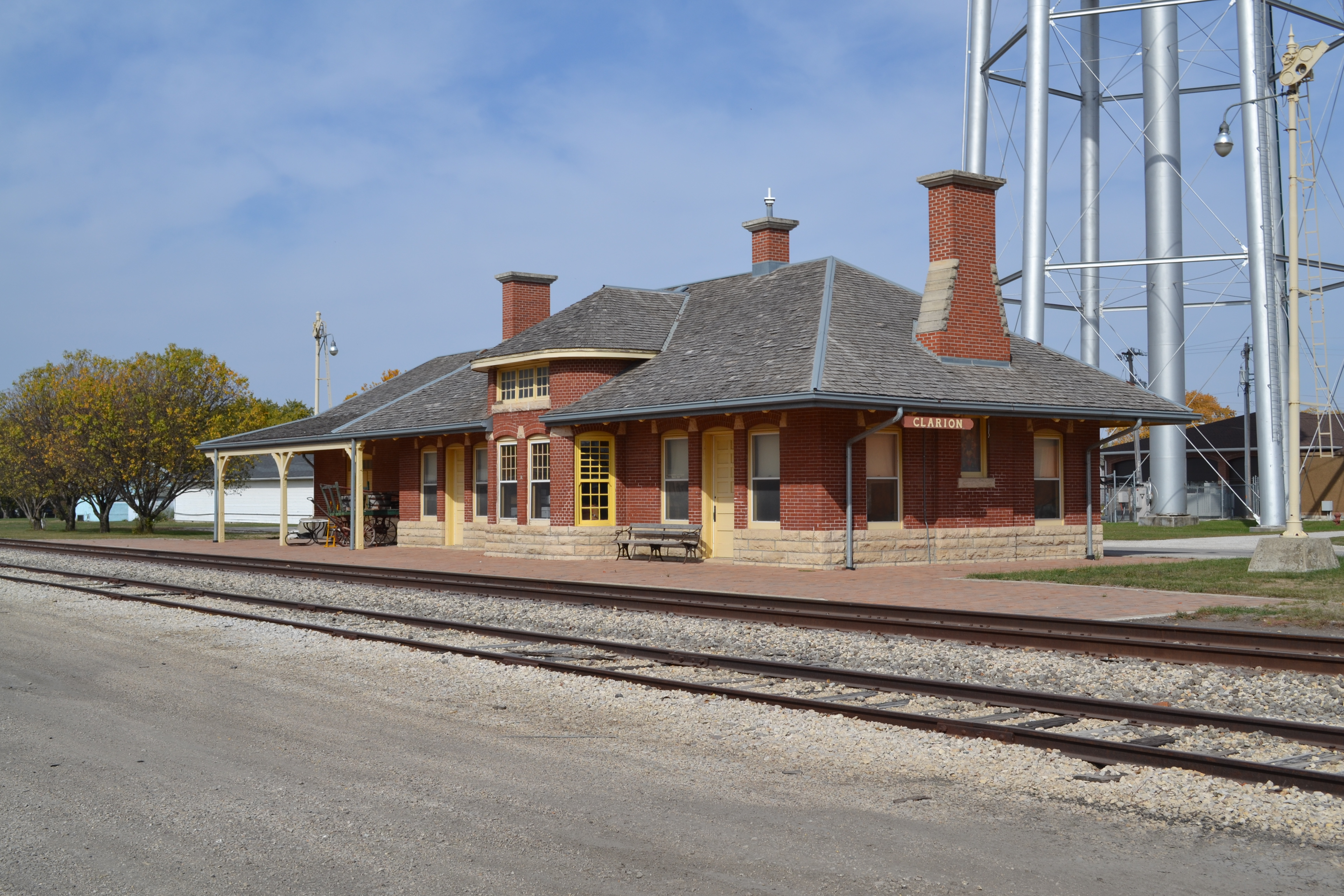

- Location within Iowa Location within the United States
- Location: 302 S. Main; Clarion, Iowa
- Coordinates: 42°43′48″N 93°43′59″W
- Area: less than 1 acre (0.40 ha)
- Built: 1898
- Built by: A.H. Connor
- Architectural style: Romanesque Revival
- NRHP reference No.: 88000926
- Added to NRHP: June 23, 1988

Burlington, Cedar Rapids and Northern Railroad Passenger Station, also known as Rock Island Railroad Depot and the Rock Island Depot Railroad Museum, is a historic building located in Clarion, Iowa, United States. The station was built in 1898 by contractor A. H. Connor & Company of Cedar Rapids, Iowa for the Burlington, Cedar Rapids and Northern Railroad (BCR&N). Clarion also had a Chicago Great Western Railway depot, no longer extant. At one time there were 14 trains that served the city. In 1903 the Chicago, Rock Island and Pacific Railway acquired the BCR&N, and this depot served that railroad. The single story, Romanesque Revival, brick structure measures 26 by 88.5 feet (7.9 by 27.0 m). It was added to the National Register of Historic Places in 1988.

The depot was restored in 1984 and currently serves as the Rock Island Depot Railroad Museum with displays of local and railroad history, and also serves as the office for the Clarion Chamber & Development office.

Preceding station	Chicago, Rock Island and Pacific Railroad	Following station
Holmes toward Watertown	Watertown – Cedar Rapids	Galt toward Cedar Rapids
