= World's Largest Peace Pipe =

Coordinates: 44°0′13.2″N 96°19′4.4″W

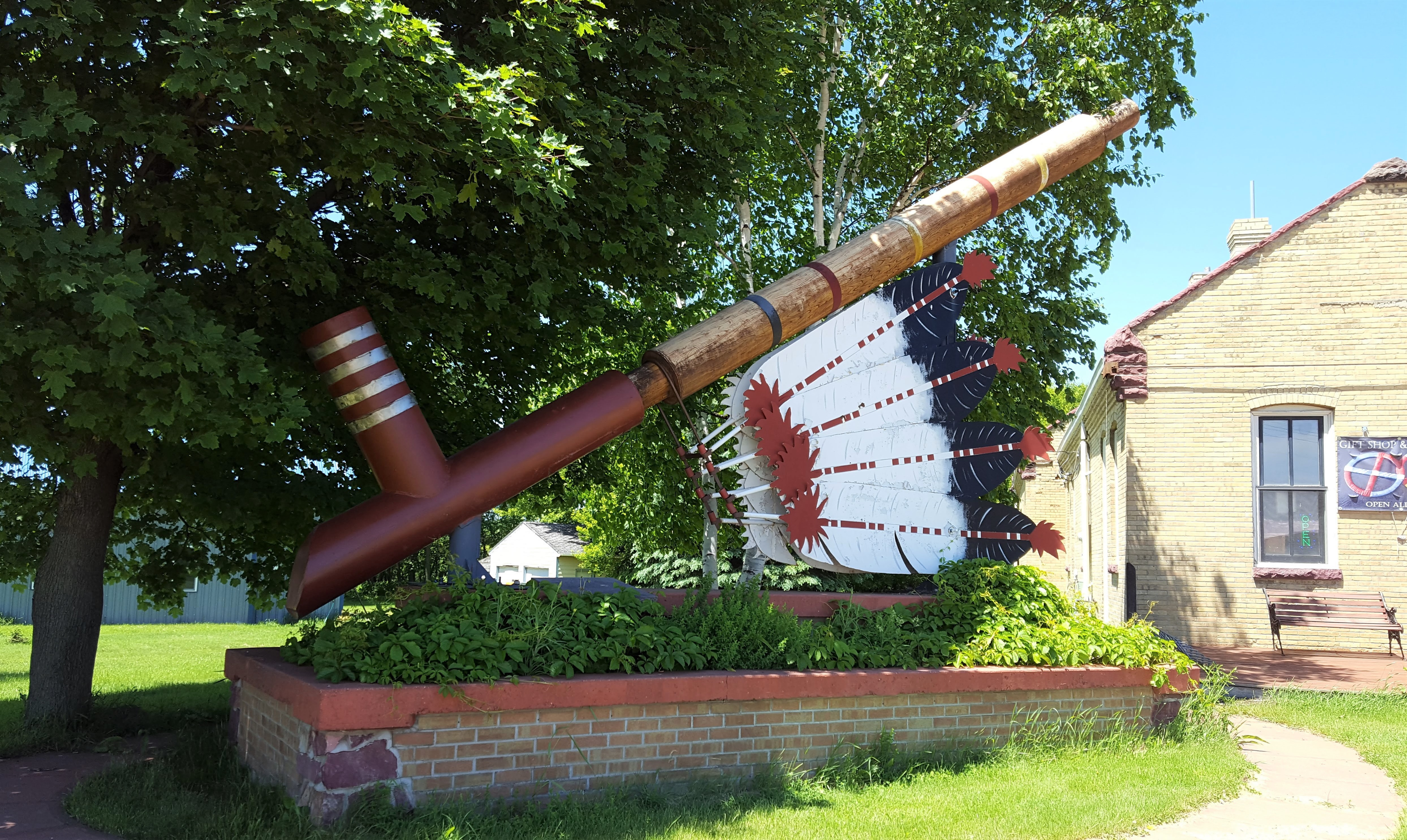
The World's Largest Peace Pipe

The World's Largest Peace Pipe is a statue of a ceremonial pipe in Pipestone, Minnesota, United States. It began with a vision shared by three spiritual people: one Lakota and two Anishinaabe. The pipe stands on the grounds of the historic Rock Island Railroad depot near the entrance to Pipestone National Monument, home to the Keepers of the Sacred Tradition of Pipemakers. The location of the giant peace pipe is significant; the pipestone quarry nearby is known as "the crossroads of the Indian world." The soft red catlinite from the quarry has been used by American Indians for thousands of years to create ceremonial peace pipes.

== Origin ==
In the 1990s, three spiritual people from different Native tribes had the same dream within a two-year period. Art Zimmiga, a Lakota from Pine Ridge, South Dakota, was the first. He came to Pipestone to write a business plan for the Keepers of the Sacred Tradition of Pipemakers. To wish success to the new organization, Zimmiga presented founder Bud Johnston (Bad River Band of Lake Superior Chippewa) with an eagle feather from his medicine bundle. To many indigenous people, the eagle feather represents the gateway to the Creator.

On his way back to Pine Ridge, Zimmiga had a day vision. He saw a huge pipe that could produce smoke. In his vision, elders were giving gifts. Each time they offered a gift, smoke came out of the big pipe.

About six months later, a Midi Anishinaabe woman named Lisa Dietz from Sault Ste. Marie, Michigan, shared a similar vision. She was a member of a group of spiritual people who blessed the depot building upon the formation of the Keepers of the Sacred Tradition of Pipemakers in 1996 and presented an eagle feather. She also had a dream of a giant pipe and encouraged the building of it.

A few months later, Bud Johnston's oldest son, Bill, came home to Pipestone on a visit from Spokane, Washington. While visiting the depot, Bill had a vision about building a huge piece pipe. He sent his father a drawing of the pipe, and the two men discussed what it would take to build it.

Bill envisioned the pipe to be about 30 feet (9 m) long. He made a scaled drawing and determined that it could be made out of steel well casing 12 inches (30 cm) in diameter and seven or eight inches (18 or 20 cm) where the bowl and stem fit together.

Bill purchased the steel and his father flew out to Spokane to begin work on the sculpture. Bud invited his youngest son, John, a meticulous welder, to help with the creation of the pipe. The pipe was designed as a "four winds" pipe, with four rings welded onto the bowl to honor the four directions from which Native people have come to Pipestone.

== Installation ==
Once it was completed, finding a location for the pipe proved challenging. The city of Pipestone was reluctant to have the pipe installed on its historic Rock Island Depot property. After much debate, the Historic Preservation Committee finally approved the installation with the agreement that the pipe would sit on a foundation of cream-colored brick (to match the depot building) and red quartzite, in a bed of flowers. The Keepers of the Sacred Tradition of Pipemakers bought the depot building and adjacent land in January 1997.

Getting the pipe from Spokane to Pipestone presented another challenge. Mike Ziebarth arranged for a trucker who delivered Bayliner boats across the country to haul it to Minnesota for the price of gas.

The pipe arrived in Pipestone for installation in January 1999. John Johnston suggested that feathers be added to the sculpture, as Indian tradition holds that the feathers help to speed prayers to the Creator. The feathers were created and attached to the sculpture during an annual pow wow the following August. A local artist painted the pipe sculpture. A poem by Rona Johnston honoring all Native people who have made the journey to Pipestone is engraved on a piece of red quartzite and mounted below the pipe.

== Regard ==
The big pipe was featured in the May 2008 issue of Reader's Digest. People come from all over the world to visit the quarries and have their picture taken in front of the world’s largest peace pipe.
