= Youngville Cafe =

- U.S. National Register of Historic Places
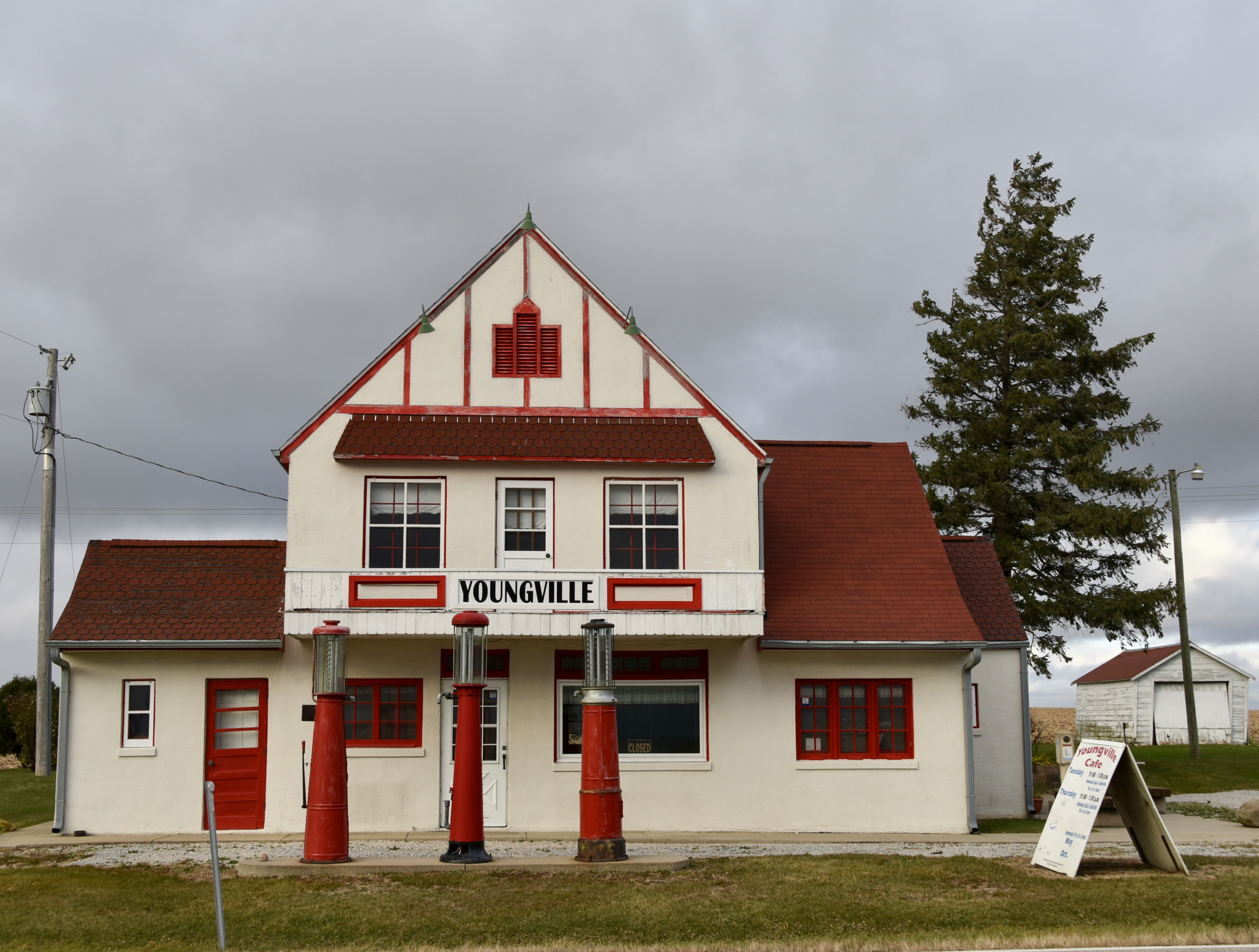

- Location within Iowa Location within the United States
- Location: 2409 73rd St. Watkins, Iowa
- Coordinates: 41°57′50″N 92°01′32″W
- Built: 1931
- Architectural style: Tudor Revival
- NRHP reference No.: 06001321
- Added to NRHP: February 1, 2007

Youngville Cafe, also known as Youngville Station, is a historic building located northwest of Watkins, Iowa, United States. It was a one-stop roadside business that included a café, a Skelly gas station, and three cabins for travelers to stay in. The cabins have subsequently been removed. The building calls attention to increasing business opportunities for women. The Tudor Revival building was built in 1931 by Joe Young on his pasture land for his widowed daughter Lizzie Wheeler to support her and her children. The main building also contained residential space where the family lived. It is located on U.S. Route 30, which at this point had been the Lincoln Highway. The café/station also served as a bus depot for the Greyhound and Jefferson bus lines.

When Wheeler retired to Cedar Rapids, she rented out the business to others to run. She returned to the café/station in 1967 after the lease ended, but it closed that year because it didn't have enough parking and vehicles could no longer park along the highway. The building was used as a residence into the 1980s, when it was abandoned. The Benton County Sesquicentennial Commission acquired it as a restoration project to celebrate Iowa's 150th anniversary of statehood in 1996. It is now owned by the Youngville Highway History Association and open as a café on a limited basis. The building was listed on the National Register of Historic Places in 2007.

Highway construction and the COVID-19 pandemic led the establishment not to open in 2020. Youngville Cafe was also impacted by the August 2020 Midwest derecho, which topped off two pine trees and collapsed the garage onto the information kiosk. The damage prevented reopening until 2022.
