= Frank G. Ray House & Carriage House =

Historic house in Iowa, United States

- U.S. National Register of Historic Places
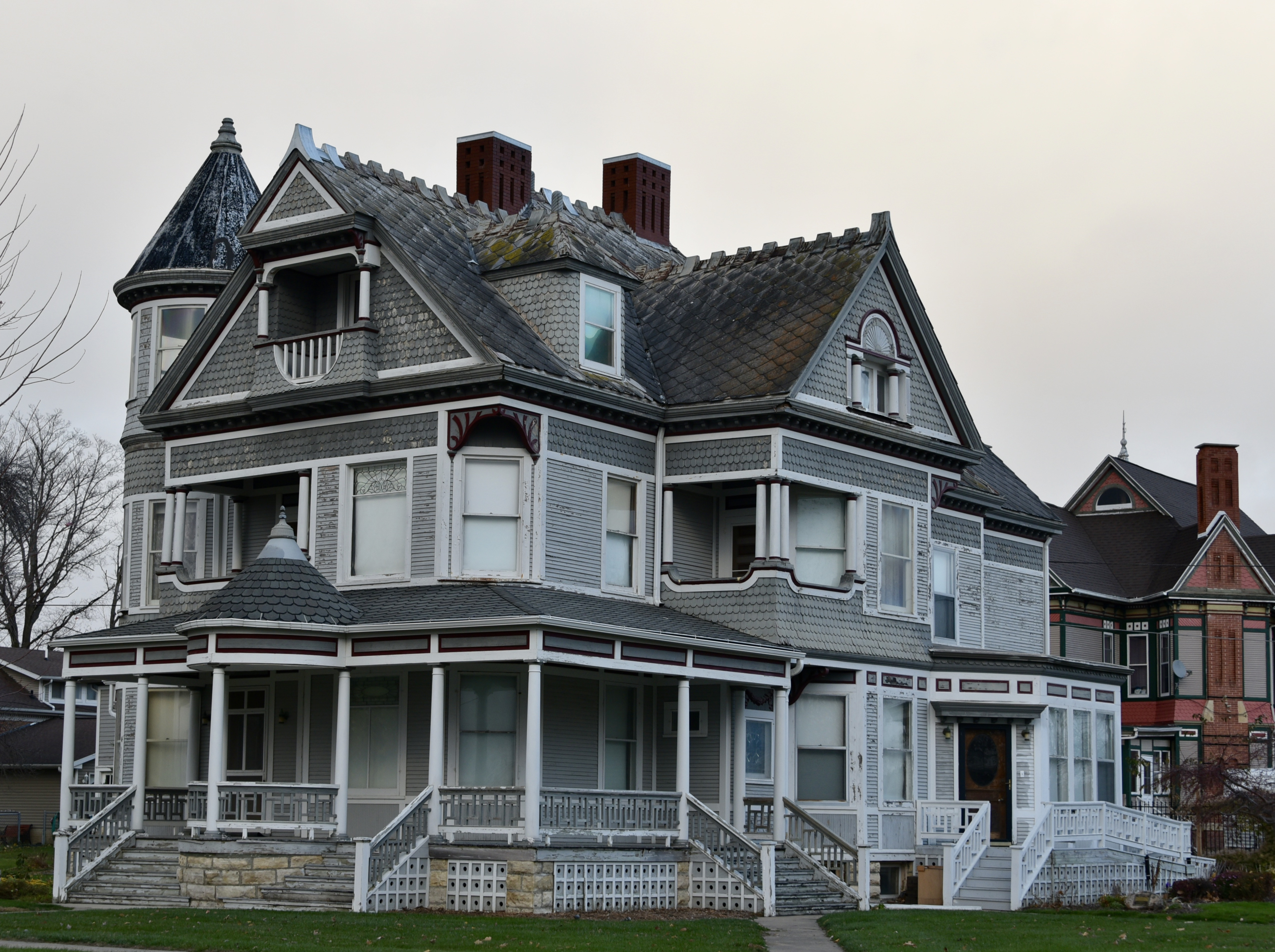

- Location within Iowa Location within the United States
- Location: 912 1st Ave. Vinton, Iowa
- Coordinates: 42°09′44″N 92°01′26″W
- Built: 1890
- Architectural style: Queen Anne
- NRHP reference No.: 82000403
- Added to NRHP: December 10, 1982

The Frank G. Ray House & Carriage House, also known as Ray Towers, is a historic residence located in Vinton, Iowa, United States. Ray was a local businessman who was associated with the Iowa Canning Company, the largest corporation in Benton County and a major employer in the region. His 2½-story frame Queen Anne house features a complex composition that includes a wraparound front porch, three decorative chimneys, a three-story round tower, porte-cochère, and small porches at various places on all stories. The carriage house features decorative shingles and an irregular roofline that is capped with a cupola and weather vane. They were listed together on the National Register of Historic Places in 1982.
