= Bellevue station (Nebraska) =

Rail depot

Bellevue

General information
- Location: 2402 Clay St, Bellevue, Nebraska 68005
- Coordinates: 41°08′03″N 95°54′19″W
- System: Former Burlington Route passenger rail station

History
- Opened: 1869
- Burlington Depot
- Formerly listed on the U.S. National Register of Historic Places
- Location within Nebraska
- Coordinates: 41°08′03″N 95°54′19″W
- NRHP reference No.: 70000375

Significant dates
- Added to NRHP: October 16, 1970
- Removed from NRHP: April 13, 1987
Location

Bellevue station, otherwise known as the Burlington Depot in Bellevue, Nebraska is a historic railroad station which served trains of the Chicago, Burlington and Quincy Railroad (Burlington Route). The depot was originally built in 1869 for the Omaha and South Western Railroad, making it the oldest surviving depot in Nebraska.

In 1940, the station had daily mixed train service to Omaha or Ashland. This service lasted at least until 1951, but was gone by 1965.

The station was listed on the National Register of Historic Places on October 16, 1970. After the depot was relocated from the railroad tracks to a local park, it was removed from the NRHP on April 13, 1987. Today, the depot is part of the Sarpy County Museum.
