= Burlington, Cedar Rapids & Northern Freight House =

- U.S. National Register of Historic Places
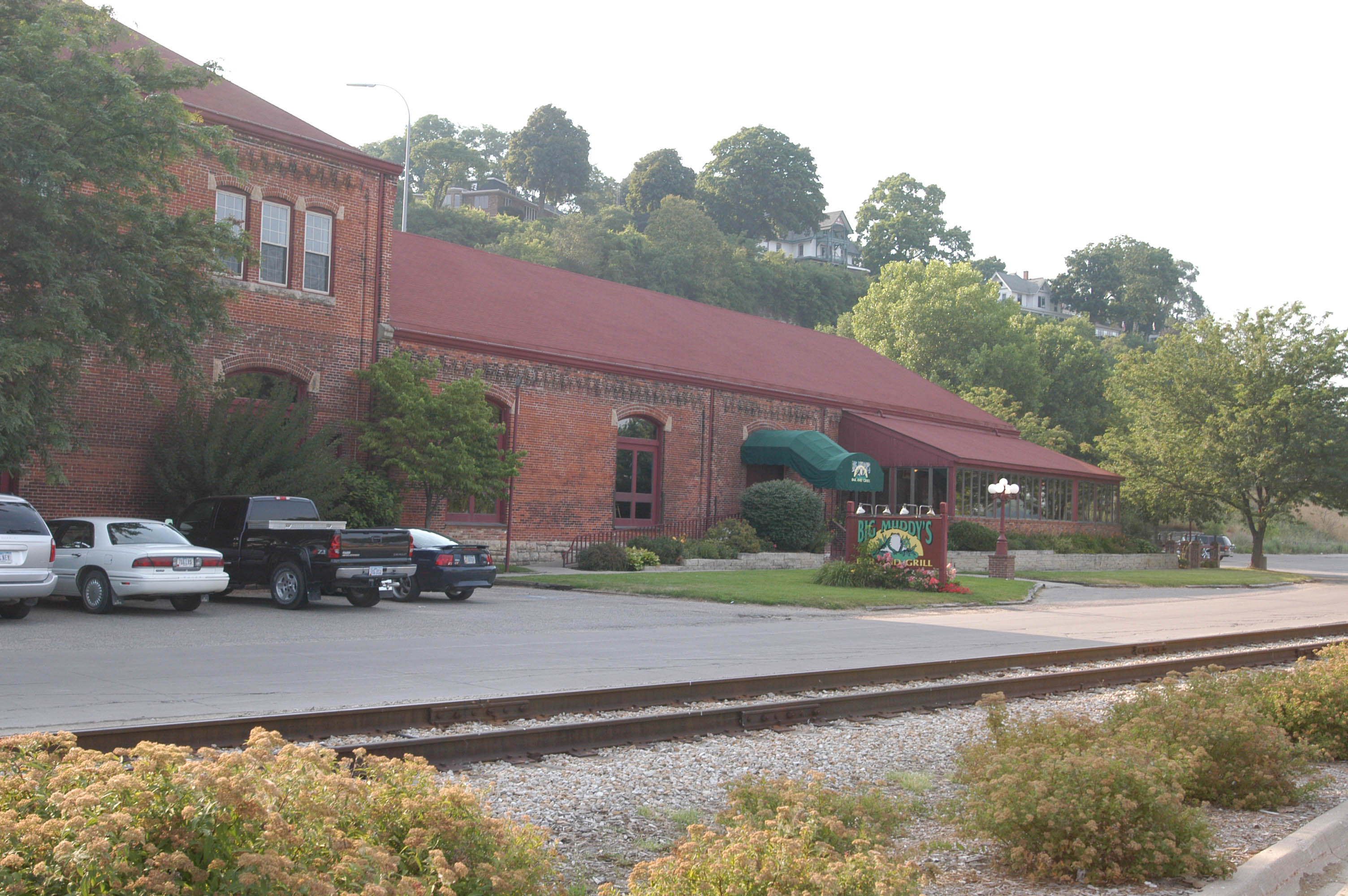

- Location within Iowa Location within the United States
- Location: Front and High Sts. Burlington, Iowa
- Coordinates: 40°48′50″N 91°05′56″W
- Area: less than one acre
- Built: 1898
- NRHP reference No.: 83000351
- Added to NRHP: January 27, 1983

The Burlington, Cedar Rapids & Northern Freight House, also known as the Rock Island Freight House, is a historic building located in Burlington, Iowa, United States. It was listed on the National Register of Historic Places in 1983.

The freight house was built by the Burlington, Cedar Rapids and Northern Railroad (BCR&N) in 1898. It replaced a smaller brick freight house that had been built in 1873. The freight house is the only remaining structure from the BCR&N left in Burlington, and the only Victorian structure remaining on the riverfront. The railroad's shops had been located further north in an area called "The Bottoms." Its original passenger depot was located in a commercial building that was located at Jefferson and Front Streets. It moved into the CB&Q's Union Depot further south along the riverfront where the Amtrak station is now located. The BCR&N, with passenger and freight service between Minneapolis and St. Louis was considered the most important north-south rail line in Iowa. In 1903 the railroad was acquired by the Chicago, Rock Island and Pacific Railroad, and the freight house served that line. After the Rock Island Line went out of business the building sat empty until it was converted into a restaurant. The structure had to be restored after floods in 1993 and 2008 inundated it.

The freight house is a two-story brick structure with a single-story wing on the north side. Freight from the trains passed through the seven bays on the east side, while freight from wagons, and later trucks, passed through the seven bays on the west side. Freight from riverboats on the Mississippi River was also transferred onto trains at this facility.
