= Pipestone station =

Historic railroad depot in Minnesota, U.S.

Pipestone
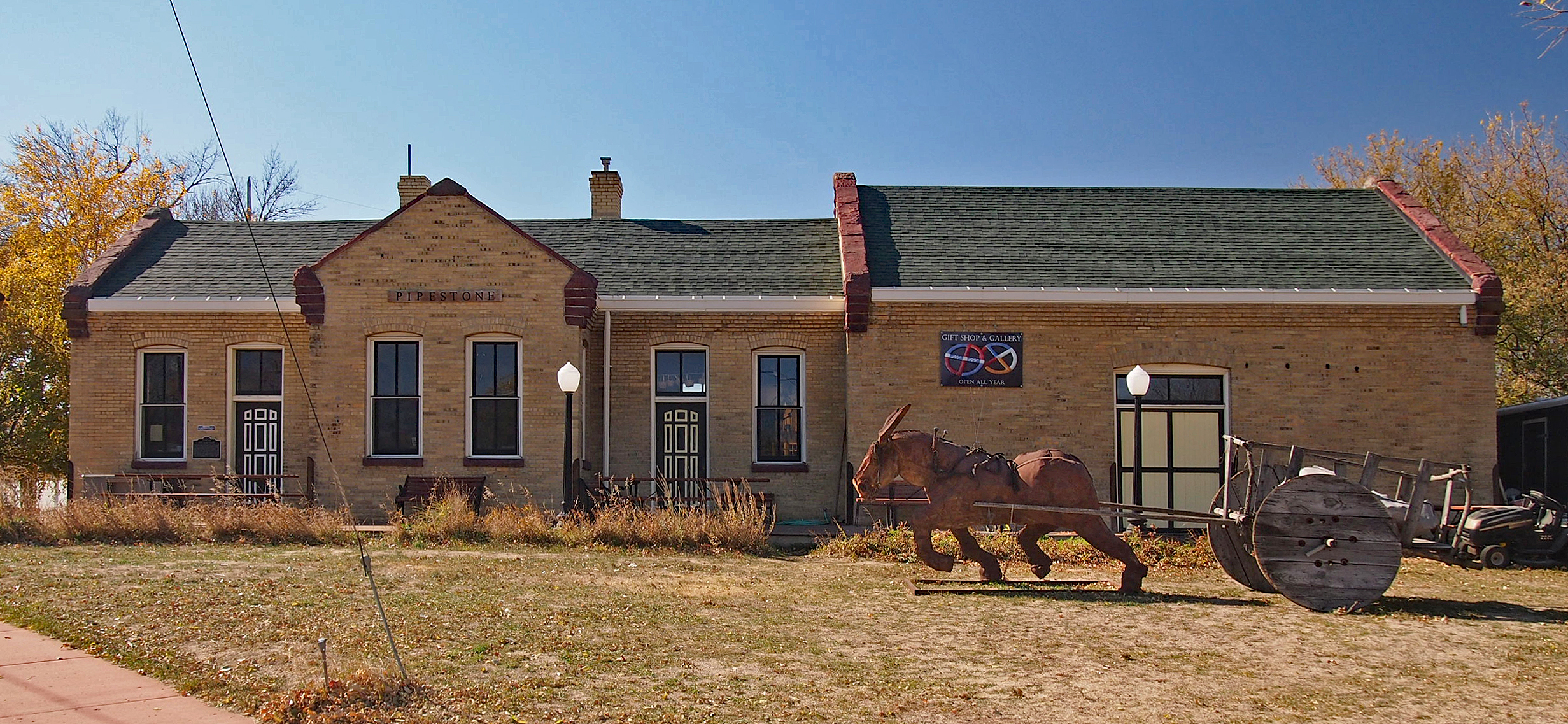
- Pipestone Depot (2012)

General information
- Location: 400 North Hiawatha Avenue, Pipestone, Minnesota
- System: Former intercity passenger rail station

History
- Opened: 1890

Former services
Preceding station	Chicago, Rock Island and Pacific Railroad	Following station
Cazenovia toward Watertown	Watertown – Cedar Rapids	Trosky toward Cedar Rapids
- Burlington Cedar Rapids and Northern Depot
- U.S. National Register of Historic Places
- Location within Minnesota
- Location: 400 North Hiawatha Avenue; Pipestone, Minnesota, USA
- Coordinates: 44°0′14″N 96°19′05″W
- Built: 1890
- NRHP reference No.: 80002124
- Added to NRHP: March 3, 1980
Location

The Burlington Cedar Rapids and Northern Depot is a historic railroad depot in Pipestone, Minnesota, United States, constructed by the Burlington, Cedar Rapids and Northern Railway in 1890. Later, the line would become a branch of the Chicago, Rock Island, and Pacific Railroad. The depot consists of a freight room, a ticket office and separate men's and women's waiting rooms.

The depot is constructed of buff colored brick with detailing of locally quarried quartzite stone. The interior partitions are of brick. The stone is used to cap the gable ends of the building. A stepped brick cornice and segmental arched windows and doors are distinct features. Window sills are of quartzite.

In plan, the Rock Island depot is fairly typical, though the separate men's and women's waiting rooms are not too common. The use of local stone in detailing distinguishes the Rock Island station. The structure is a replacement depot built on the site of the earlier 1884 frame depot. Pipestone paid $25,000 in bonds for the line, and the local Close brothers donated the right-of-way.

The Pipestone depot was located on the line between Ellsworth, Minnesota and Watertown, South Dakota and by 1935 had already lost dedicated passenger trains. The 1935 and 1949 timetables both show mixed train service to the station, but this too was gone by the 1955 timetable.
