= Sankot Motor Company =

- U.S. National Register of Historic Places
- U.S. Historic district – Contributing property
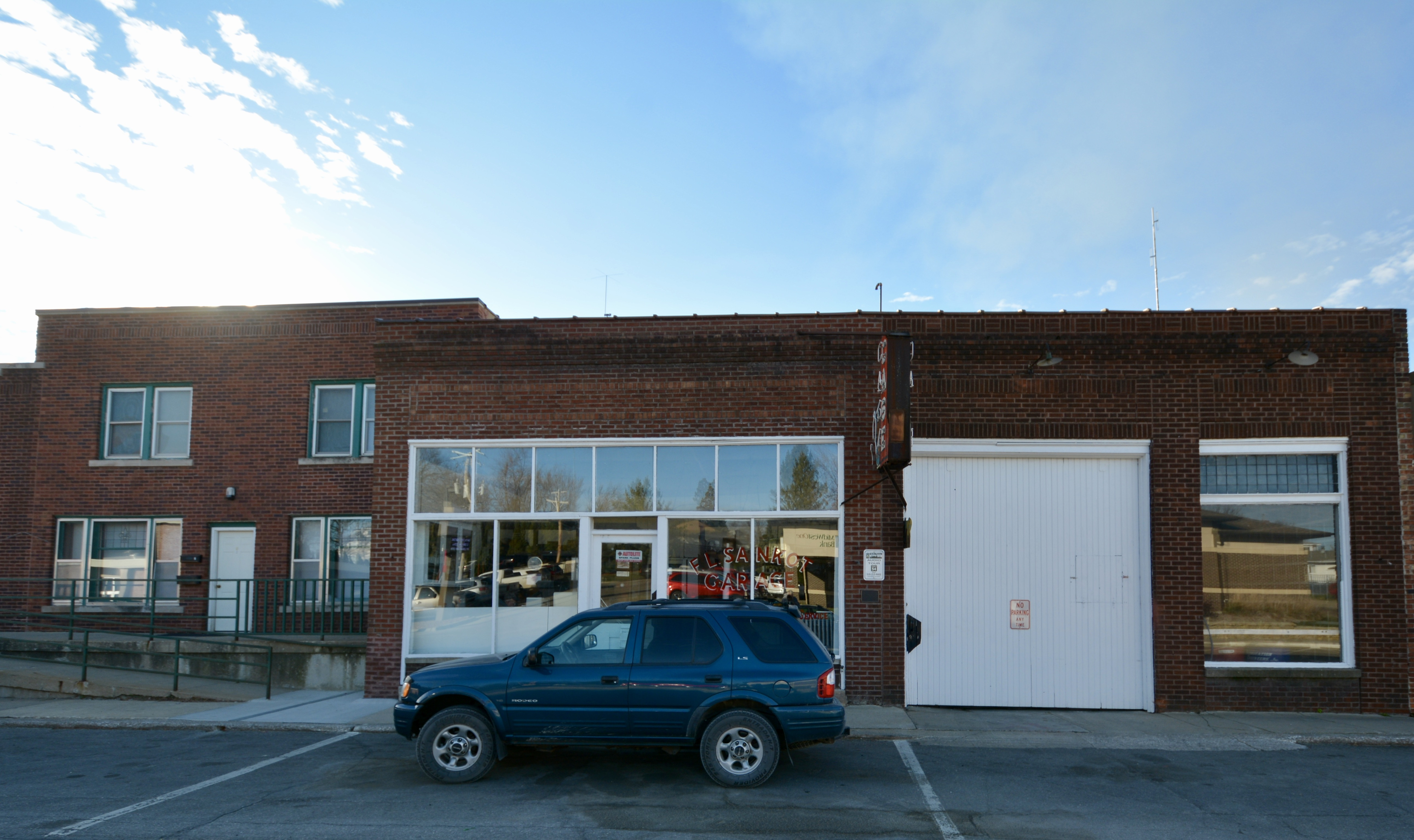

- Location within Iowa Location within the United States
- Location: 807 13th St. Belle Plaine, Iowa
- Coordinates: 41°53′49″N 92°16′34″W
- Built: c. 1910
- Part of: Belle Plaine Main Street Historic District (ID13000828)
- NRHP reference No.: 95000558
- Added to NRHP: July 28, 1995

The Sankot Motor Company, also known as the Sankot Garage, is a historic building located in Belle Plaine, Iowa, United States. The historical significance of this building is its association with the increase in all-season travel and the development of businesses to serve them along the Lincoln Highway, the United States's first transcontinental route. It is a brick front building with side walls of clay tile that was constructed on a concrete foundation. The west half of the building was added in 1927. It was operated by O.B. Charles and Sid Sankot until 1937. They also sold Chryslers. Gasoline was sold from 1920 to 1944. F.L. Sankot bought the business in 1937. In addition to vehicle repair he sold Case and Oliver tractors and implements. William and Jerry Sankot purchased the business in 1985, and limited it to passenger, commercial and agricultural vehicle repairs. The building was listed on the National Register of Historic Places in 1995. It was included as a contributing property in the Belle Plaine Main Street Historic District in 2013.
