= San Francisco Challenger =

Overview
- Service type: Inter-city rail
- Status: Discontinued
- Locale: Western United States
- First service: 1936
- Last service: 1947
- Successor: Gold Coast
- Former operators: Chicago and North Western Railway; Union Pacific Railroad; Southern Pacific Railroad

Route
- Termini: Chicago, Illinois; Oakland, California
- Line used: Overland Route

Technical
- Track gauge: 4 ft 8 1/2 in (1,435 mm)

The San Francisco Challenger was a train operated by Southern Pacific Railroad, Union Pacific Railroad and Chicago and Northwestern Railroad. Starting in 1936, it ran from Oakland, California to Chicago, Illinois via the Overland Route. Schedule was about 60 hours—three nights and two days. In 1947 it was replaced by the Gold Coast, which was discontinued in January 1955.

== See also ==
- Challenger — a Union Pacific and Chicago and Northwestern train that ran from Chicago to Los Angeles
