= Sioux Falls station (Rock Island Line) =

Former train station in Sioux Falls, South Dakota

Sioux Falls
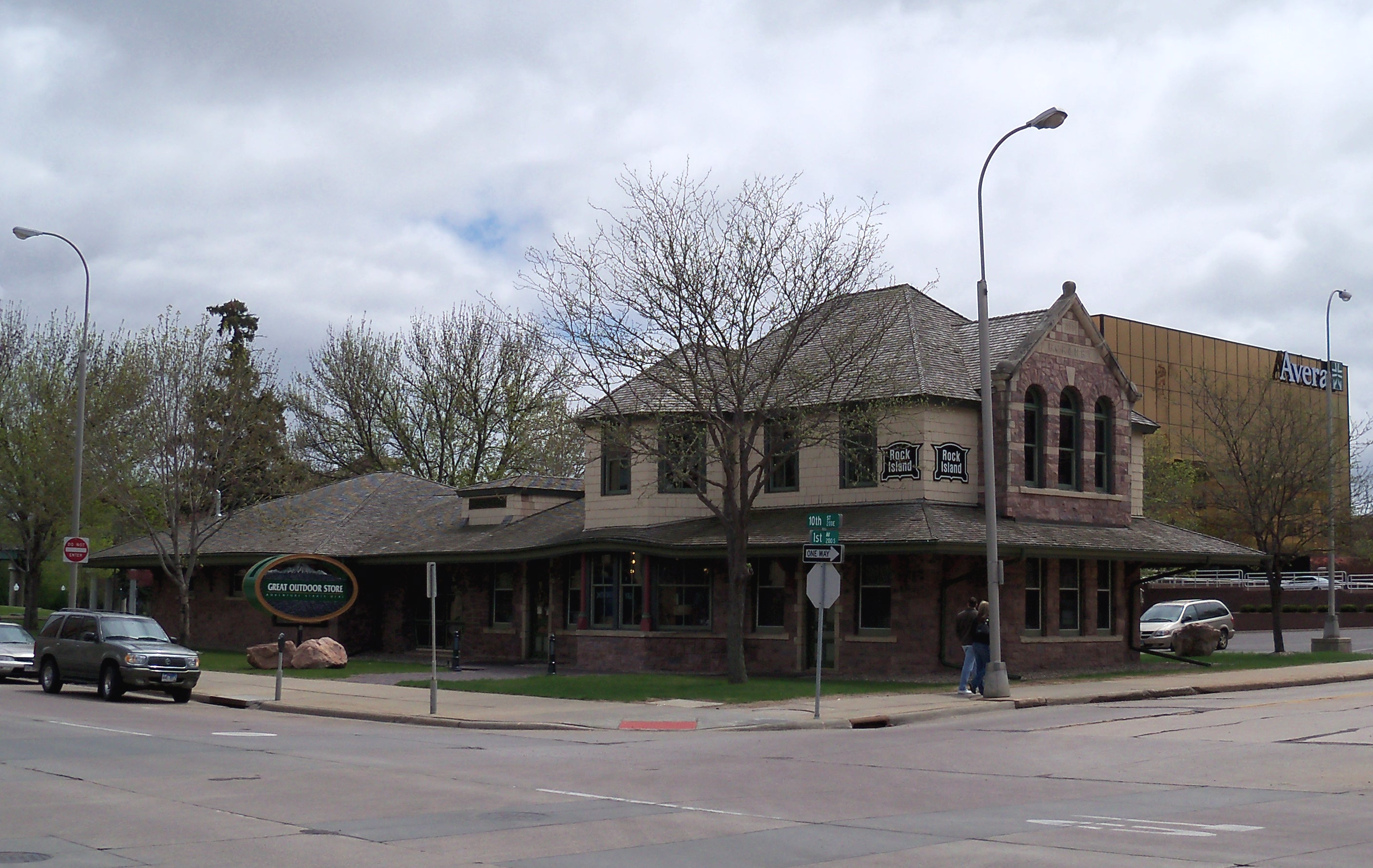
- The station in May 2011.

General information
- Location: 201 East Tenth Street, Sioux Falls, South Dakota 57104
- System: Former Rock Island Line passenger rail station
- Platforms: 1

History
- Opened: 1886
- Closed: 1970

Former services
Preceding station	Chicago, Rock Island and Pacific Railroad	Following station
Terminus	Sioux Falls – Ellsworth	Shindler toward Ellsworth
- Rock Island Depot
- U.S. National Register of Historic Places
- Location within South Dakota Location within the United States
- Location: 201 E. 10th St., Sioux Falls, South Dakota
- Coordinates: 43°32′45″N 96°43′29″W
- Area: 0.1 acres (0.040 ha)
- Built: 1886
- Architectural style: Romanesque
- NRHP reference No.: 74001895
- Added to NRHP: February 15, 1974
Location

The Rock Island Depot is a historic railroad station located at 201 East 10th Street in Sioux Falls, South Dakota. The station opened in 1886 to serve the Burlington, Cedar Rapids and Northern Railway, a predecessor of the Rock Island. The ashlar and wood building has a Richardsonian Romanesque design with a side-facing stone gable and an octagonal turret. The interior of the station includes a waiting room, a ticket office, and the station agent's quarters. As the railroad network spread through South Dakota, Sioux Falls became the state's primary commercial and transportation hub due to its established station. The station served passenger trains through Sioux Falls until 1970.

The station was added to the National Register of Historic Places on February 15, 1974.
