= Central Vinton Residential Historic District =

Historic district in Iowa, United States

- U.S. National Register of Historic Places
- U.S. Historic district
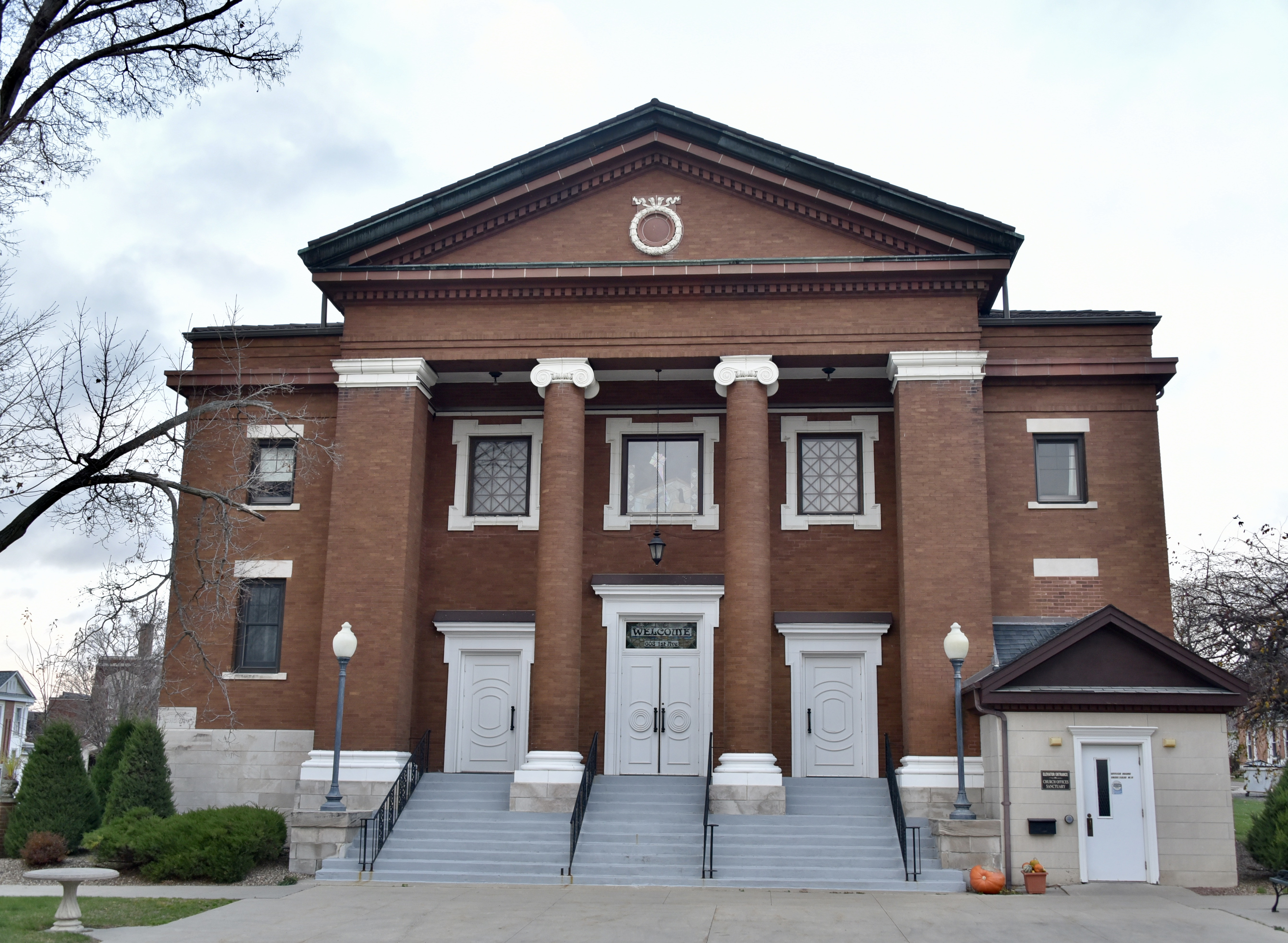
- Presbyterian Church of Vinton (1913)

- Location within Iowa Location within the United States
- Location: Roughly bounded by 2nd & D Aves., W. 13th & W. 6th Sts. Vinton, Iowa
- Coordinates: 42°09′45″N 92°01′34″W
- Area: 50 acres (20 ha)
- Architect: William F. Murphy; Charles A. Dieman
- Architectural style: Greek Revival; Late Victorian
- NRHP reference No.: 12000948
- Added to NRHP: November 21, 2012

The Central Vinton Residential Historic District is a nationally recognized historic district located in Vinton, Iowa, United States. It was listed on the National Register of Historic Places in 2012. At the time of its nomination it contained 266 resources, which included 184 contributing buildings, one contributing structure, and 81 non-contributing buildings. Most of the contributing buildings are houses, and outbuildings. Second Avenue retains its brick paving and it is the contributing structure. Vinton is the county seat of Benton County, and this is one of its most affluent neighborhoods. Because the town is a center of commerce and government, it started to grow in the mid-to-late-nineteenth century.

Over 90% of the houses are frame construction, and the rest are brick. A large variety of popular late 19th- and early 20th-century architectural styles are represented in the district. They include: Greek Revival, Gothic Revival, Queen Anne, Second Empire, Italianate, Neoclassical, Tudor Revival, American Foursquare, Colonial Revival, American Craftsman and Bungalows. The houses were largely built before 1930, with a few built after World War II. Three churches are also included in the district: First Baptist (Neoclassical; 1915), Presbyterian Church of Vinton (Neoclassical; 1913), and Faith Independent Baptist (Gothic Revival, c. 1920).
