= Upper Stone Schoolhouse =

- U.S. National Register of Historic Places
- Location within Iowa Location within the United States
- Location: East of Vinton
- Coordinates: 42°10′28″N 91°53′30″W
- Built: 1875
- NRHP reference No.: 83000340
- Added to NRHP: July 7, 1983

The Upper Stone Schoolhouse, also known as the Scott House, is a historic One-room schoolhouse located east of Vinton, Iowa, United States. Built in 1875, this is an unusual example of a stone one-room school. There was only one other built in Benton County, about 2 miles (3.2 km) to the southeast. The stone schoolhouse was replaced by a wood-frame building to the south sometime between 1905 and 1910 to accommodate the large number of students. It served eight rural sections of farmland from the time . The Scott family, who owned the adjacent farmland, bought the stone school building after it closed and converted it into a house. It was listed on the National Register of Historic Places in 1983.
