= Belle Plaine Main Street Historic District =

Historic district in Iowa, United States

- U.S. National Register of Historic Places
- U.S. Historic district
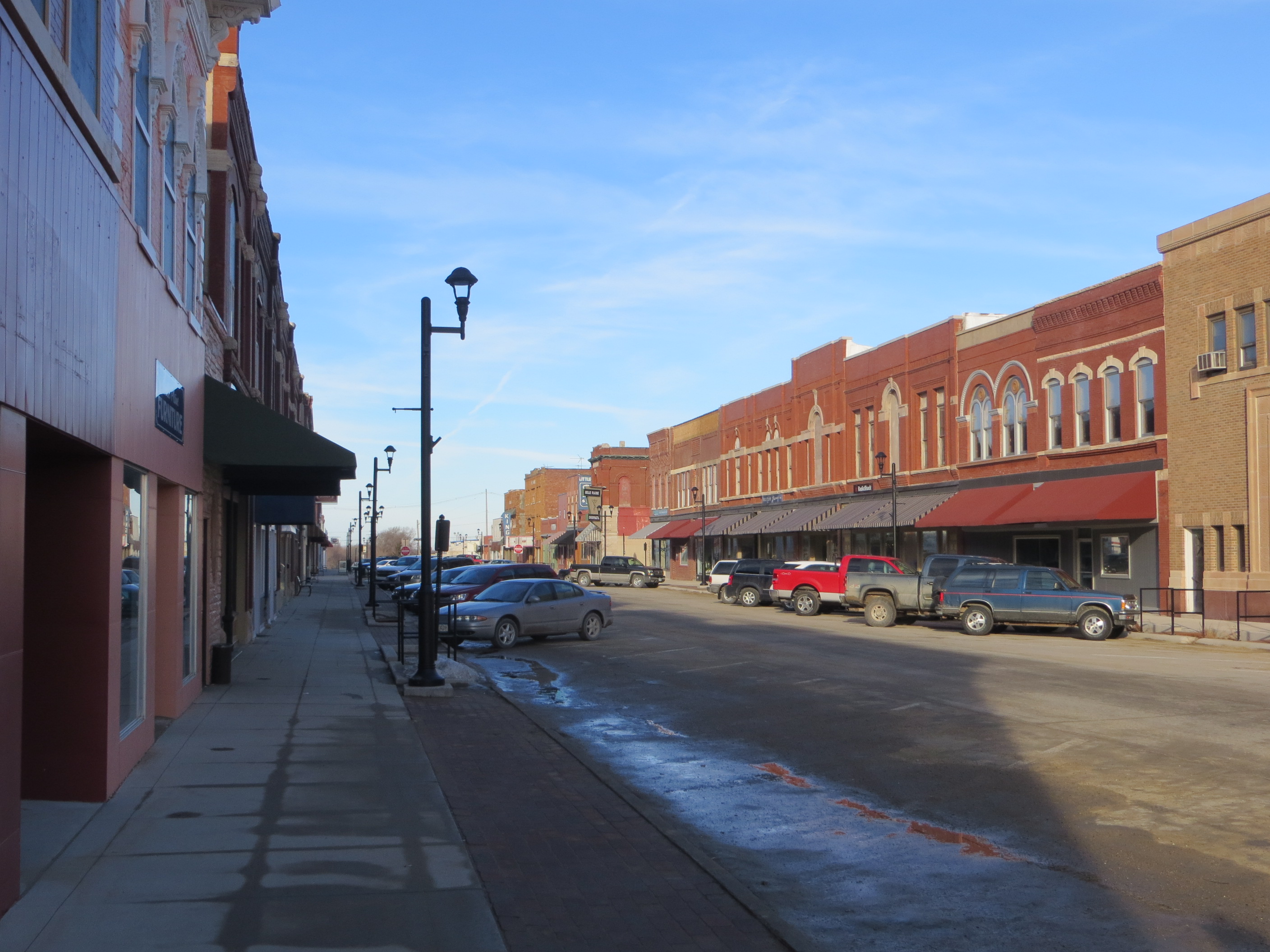

- Location within Iowa Location within the United States
- Location: Roughly bounded by 7th & 9th Avenues and 11th & 13th Streets; Belle Plaine, Iowa
- Coordinates: 41°53′47″N 92°16′36″W
- Area: 11.47 acres (4.64 ha)
- Architects: Charles B. Zalesky; Charles A. Dieman
- Architectural style: Classical Revival; Early Commercial
- NRHP reference No.: 13000828
- Added to NRHP: October 16, 2013

The Belle Plaine Main Street Historic District is a nationally recognized historic district located in Belle Plaine, Iowa, United States. It was listed on the National Register of Historic Places in 2013. At the time of its nomination it contained 63 resources, which included 46 contributing buildings, one contributing structure, and 16 non-contributing buildings. The historic district covers most of the city's central business district. Belle Plaine was laid out in 1862 as a railroad town. The Cedar Rapids & Missouri River railroad under lease to the Chicago & North Western Railway was extended westward from Cedar Rapids that year, as it built as rapidly as the war would allow toward Marshalltown. The commercial district is adjacent to the tracks. A major fire destroyed much of the business district in 1894. Thirty-five buildings in the district were built in the months after the fire.

Commercial buildings dominate the district. They include the Sankot Motor Company (c. 1910), which is individually listed on the National Register. Also included in the district are the Pythian Castle (1895), Masonic Temple (1895), Odd Fellows Building (1906), two theaters, the former Hart Memorial Library (1931), the Chicago & North Western Railroad Depot and Freight House (1894), and the section of the tracks adjacent to the depot. The period of significance is from 1885 to 1960, and the buildings are constructed during that time frame. The Classical Revival and the Early Commercial architectural styles are dominant. Architect-designed buildings include the First National Bank (Charles A. Dieman; 1921), and the Hart Memorial Library (Charles B. Zalesky). Both architects were from Cedar Rapids.
