= Preston's Station Historic District =

Historic district in Iowa, United States

- U.S. National Register of Historic Places
- U.S. Historic district
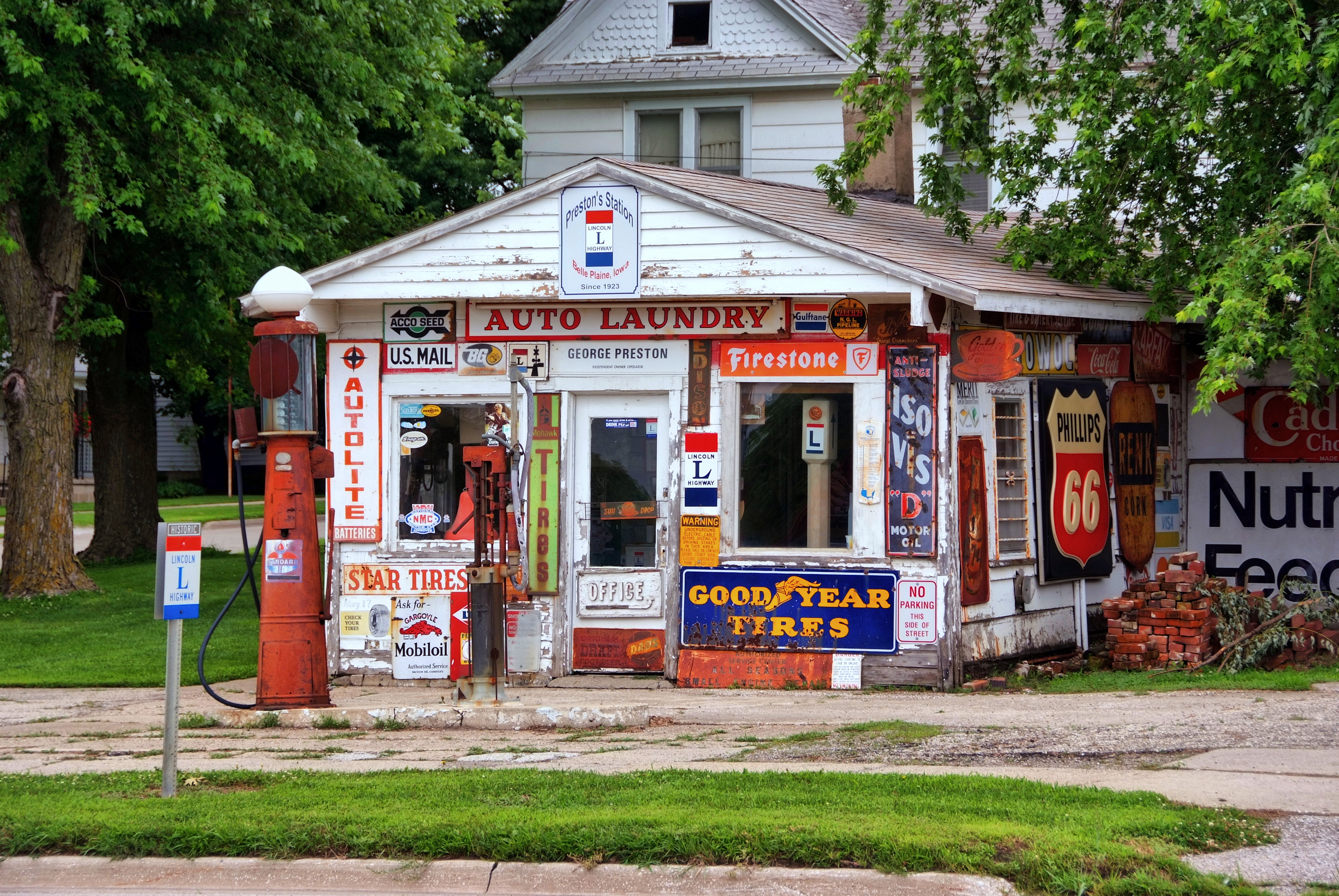
- The station was moved to this location in 1921.

- Location within Iowa Location within the United States
- Location: 402 4th Ave. Belle Plaine, Iowa
- Coordinates: 41°53′14″N 92°16′59″W
- Built: 1912, 1943
- NRHP reference No.: 100005572
- Added to NRHP: September 21, 2020

The Preston's Station Historic District is a nationally recognized historic district located in Belle Plaine, Iowa, United States. It was listed on the National Register of Historic Places in 2020. The district is composed of three contributing buildings, a gas station, garage, and motel.

The gas station was built by Frank Fiene in 1912 at the corner of 7th Avenue and 19th Street. It was moved to its present 4th Avenue location in 1921 to take advantage of the traffic off of the Lincoln Highway when it was rerouted through Belle Plaine. George W. Preston bought the station two years later for $100.

The gas station is a single-story wood-frame structure. It had a canopy that extended over the gas pumps, but it was removed prior to 1965. A single-story concrete block garage was built next to the station in 1943. It features a sliding barn door on its main facade. Automobile repairs were performed in the garage before it housed Preston's memorabilia collection, which is now located in the former gas station as well. Antique advertising and highway signs cover the station and the garage. A three-unit motel was added next to the garage sometime before 1949. The gas station remained in operation until 1989.
