= Pacific Limited =

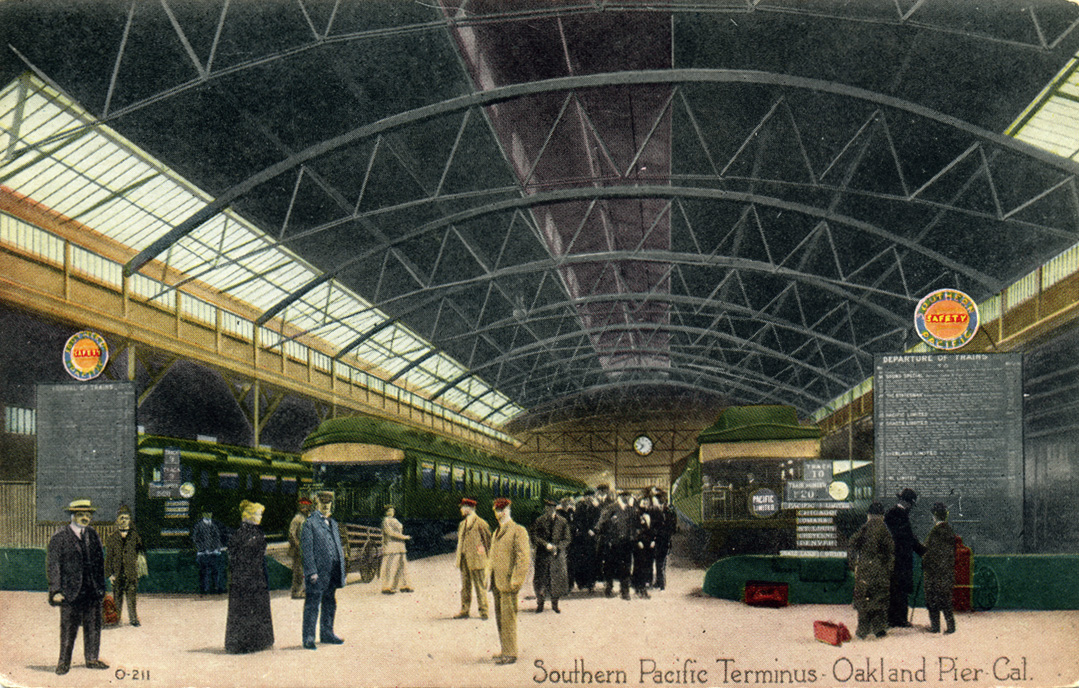
- An early-20th-century postcard showing the Pacific Limited (right) at Oakland Long Wharf.

Overview
- Service type: Inter-city rail
- Status: Discontinued
- Locale: Central and Western United States
- First service: 1913
- Last service: 1947
- Former operator(s): UP and CNW; UP and SP; UP and MILW

Route
- Termini: Chicago, Illinois * Los Angeles, California: Oakland, California; Portland, Oregon
- Distance travelled: 785 miles (1,263 km) (1946) (Chicago - Los Angeles, via Salt Lake City)
- Service frequency: Daily
- Train number(s): 21-23-25 (westbound); 24-26-22 (eastbound)

On-board services
- Seating arrangements: Reclining seat coaches (1946)
- Sleeping arrangements: Open sections, double bedrooms, drawing rooms
- Catering facilities: Dining car

Technical
- Track gauge: 4 ft 8 1/2 in (1,435 mm)

The Pacific Limited was an American named passenger train which from 1913 to 1947 was jointly operated by three railroads on the Overland Route between Portland, Oregon, Oakland, California, Los Angeles, California and Chicago. The Southern Pacific Railroad (SP) handled the train west of Ogden, Utah, the Union Pacific Railroad (UP) between Ogden and Omaha, Nebraska, and east of the Missouri River to Chicago it was operated at different times by the Chicago, Milwaukee, St. Paul and Pacific Railroad (MILW) or the Chicago and North Western Railway (CNW). While the train was advertised as going to San Francisco, it actually went to Oakland. Passengers completed the trip by ferry from Oakland Pier to the San Francisco Ferry Building at the foot of Market Street in San Francisco.

== History ==
The Pacific Limited first ran on April 3, 1913 as train numbers 19 and 20 carrying standard and tourist sleeping cars on a 68-hour trip between San Francisco and Chicago over the SP, the UP, and the MILW railroads. Trains ran over the CNW east of Omaha rather than the MILW under United States Railroad Administration (USRA) control from June 2, 1918 to November 14, 1920. Routing east of Omaha returned to the CNW as a result of Great Depression service reductions in September 1930. Pacific Limited train numbers were changed to 20 and 21 on December 11, 1932; to 10 and 21 on April 1, 1933; to 14 and 21 on April 1, 1935; and to 21 and 22 on June 7, 1942. The Pacific Limited operated briefly as the Pacific after July 10, 1947.

== Cancellation ==
Service over the UP and CNW was cancelled on October 1947 1, and replaced by the SP Mail handling baggage, mail, and express cars between Oakland and Ogden, Utah with a single coach for local passengers.

== Saint Louis Express ==
Upon expiration of USRA control on November 14, 1920, the Wabash Railroad initiated the Saint Louis Express as train numbers 21 and 22 carrying coaches with standard and tourist sleeping cars between St. Louis and the Overland Route over which UP and SP took those trains to and from San Francisco. Six years later the Saint Louis Express was consolidated with the Pacific Limited on the Overland Route.

== Gold Coast ==
Cancellation of the Saint Louis Express on November 14, 1926 coincided with a faster schedule requiring extra fare for the Overland Limited. The Gold Coast began operating over the same Overland Route on the old slower schedule as trains 27 and 28. The Gold Coast was temporarily discontinued on June 14, 1931 as part of the Great Depression service reductions, but reappeared as train numbers 23 and 24 on October 1, 1947 with a 58.5-hour schedule for first class and coach passengers between San Francisco and Chicago replacing both the Pacific Limited and the San Francisco Challenger. The Gold Coast was discontinued on January 9, 1955.
