= Frank E. and Katie (Cherveny) Zalesky House =

Historic house in Iowa, United States

- U.S. National Register of Historic Places
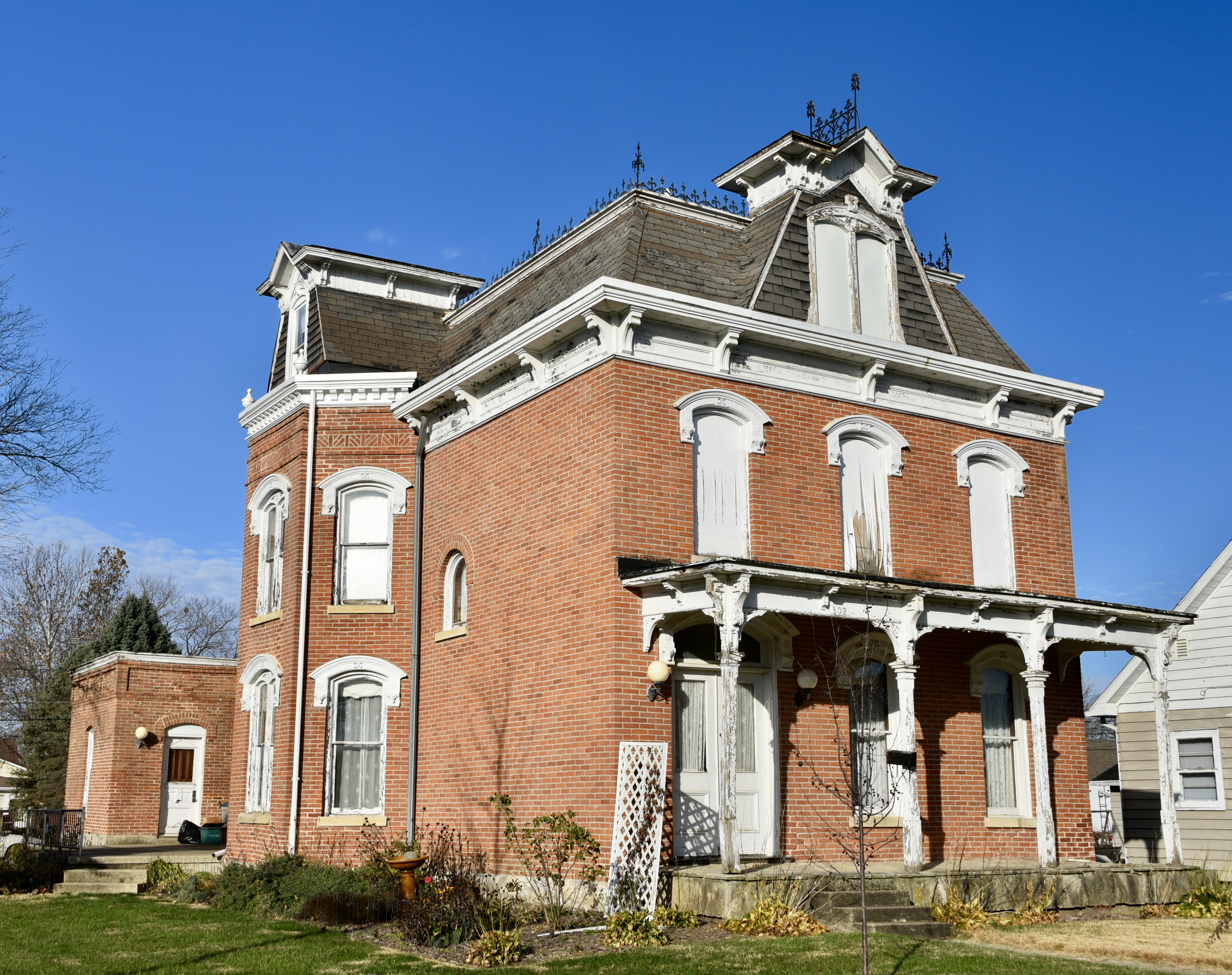

- Location within Iowa Location within the United States
- Location: 802 9th Ave. Belle Plaine, Iowa
- Coordinates: 41°53′32.7″N 92°16′31.1″W
- Built: 1872
- Built by: James Park
- Architect: Charles A. Dieman
- Architectural style: Second Empire
- NRHP reference No.: 12000191
- Added to NRHP: April 10, 2012

The Frank E. and Katie (Cherveny) Zalesky House is a historic building located in Belle Plaine, Iowa, United States. Built around 1872, the 2½-story, brick house features a mansard roof with dormers, roof cresting, veranda-like porch, bracketed cornice, a two-story bay, and windows with heavy hoods. The Zalesky family were part of Belle Plaine's Bohemian immigrant community. That community included author, philosopher, teacher and journalist František Klácel who lived in this house at the end of his life under the Zalesky's care. The house was listed on the National Register of Historic Places in 2012.
