= Omaha and South Western Railroad =

The Omaha and South Western Railroad was a subsidiary of the Chicago, Burlington and Quincy Railroad, carrying the CB&Q from the west to Omaha, Nebraska starting in the 1860s.

The railroad line is still in operation by the BNSF Railway, successor to the CB&Q; Amtrak trains also operate over the line.

The town of La Platte in Sarpy County was laid out by the Omaha and Southwestern Railroad in 1870, and was named for the surrounding Platte River valley.
