= Hoover Nature Trail =

Rail trail in Iowa, United States

The Hoover Nature Trail (HNT) is a crushed limestone rail trail in eastern Iowa that follows the old Chicago, Rock Island, and Pacific Railroad route between Burlington and Cedar Rapids. The trail is a shared-use trail for bicycling, hiking, jogging, walking, cross-country skiing, and nature study, and it is 24 miles (39 km) long.

Portions of the trail are in varying stages of development, with sections near Ely, West Branch, Nichols, Columbus Junction, and Morning Sun completed. In 1990, a three-mile (4.8 km) section opened east of Morning Sun. Lately, there has been a renewed push to connect the HNT with other trails in eastern Iowa.

The trail is part of the American Discovery Trail, and when completed, the HNT will become Iowa’s longest recreational trail.

== History ==
When the Chicago, Rock Island, and Pacific Railroad went bankrupt, Milly Gregg led a group of West Liberty, Iowa residents to preserve some features of the former Burlington, Cedar Rapids, and Northern mainline. Initial efforts focused on a possible steam-powered tourist line, which proved impractical. In the early 1990s, under Gregg's leadership, the Hoover Nature Trail began acquiring the Burlington to Cedar Rapids right of way for conversion to a recreational trail.
