= Watkins, Iowa =

- Census-designated place
- Location within the state of Iowa
- Coordinates: 41°53′28″N 91°59′11″W
- Country: United States
- State: Iowa
- County: Benton

Area
  - Total: 0.41 sq mi (1.07 km^{2})
  - Land: 0.41 sq mi (1.07 km^{2})
  - Water: 0 sq mi (0.00 km^{2})
- Elevation: 830 ft (250 m)

Population (2020)
  - Total: 116
  - Density: 280.2/sq mi (108.18/km^{2})
- Time zone: UTC-6 (Central (CST))
  - Summer (DST): UTC-5 (CDT)
- ZIP codes: 52354
- FIPS code: 19-82515
- GNIS feature ID: 462737

Watkins is an unincorporated community and census-designated place (CDP) in southeastern Benton County, Iowa, United States. As of the 2020 census, it had a population of 116. Watkins lies along local roads south of the city of Vinton, the county seat of Benton County. Its elevation is 830 feet (250 m) above sea level. Although Watkins is unincorporated, it has a post office, with the ZIP code of 52354, which opened on 15 December 1873. Watkins was platted in 1874. Watkins is within the Benton Community School District.

== History ==
The community was named for John Burton Watkins who was the Superintendent of the Iowa Divisions of the Chicago & North Western Railway from 1870 until he was killed in a tragic railroad accident near there on 30 October 1873. Nearly the entire C&NW Rwy. management team was witness to the accident. "...Albert Keep, President of the road; James Howe, General Manager; Marvin Hughitt, General Superintendent; John B. Watkins, Superintendent of the Iowa Division; M. Johnson, Chief Engineer; W. Ferry, Director, and Horace Williams, President of the Chicago, Iowa, and Nebraska Railroad Company were on a tour of inspection over the road."

During the early morning on 30 October 1873 the managers of the company were eastbound on the road from Council Bluffs, the western terminus of the division, headed back to Chicago when the train became stalled. It was overtaken by a freight train that was unable to stop in time to avoid a collision. Supt. Watkins was crushed between the Director's car and the Pullman sleeping car, expiring after about 20 minutes.

Watkins was previously Master of Transportation for the Iowa Division under Division Supt. Isaac B. Howe. Subsequently he replaced Howe as Supt. when Howe became Chief Engineer. After Watkins death Howe covered the Supt. position in addition to his other duties. In the early morning Howe received the following telegraph from Supt. Hughitt:

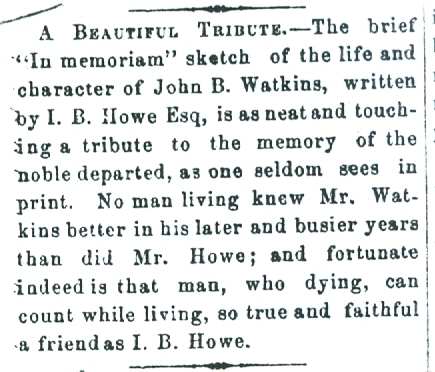
Watkins Death 30Oct73 tribute by IB Howe

"C. Rapids 30 ...    Isaac Howe  ...   Mr. Watkins is dead.  Will you break the news to his wife in your own way.  M.  Hughitt"

== Demographics ==
=== 2020 census ===
As of the census of 2020, there were 116 people, 49 households, and 30 families residing in the community. The population density was 280.2 inhabitants per square mile (108.2/km^{2}). There were 54 housing units at an average density of 130.4 per square mile (50.4/km^{2}). The racial makeup of the community was 96.6% White, 0.0% Black or African American, 0.0% Native American, 0.0% Asian, 0.0% Pacific Islander, 0.0% from other races and 3.4% from two or more races. Hispanic or Latino persons of any race comprised 2.6% of the population.

Of the 49 households, 12.2% of which had children under the age of 18 living with them, 53.1% were married couples living together, 4.1% were cohabitating couples, 12.2% had a female householder with no spouse or partner present and 30.6% had a male householder with no spouse or partner present. 38.8% of all households were non-families. 30.6% of all households were made up of individuals, 22.4% had someone living alone who was 65 years old or older.

The median age in the community was 44.4 years. 23.3% of the residents were under the age of 20; 6.9% were between the ages of 20 and 24; 22.4% were from 25 and 44; 25.9% were from 45 and 64; and 21.6% were 65 years of age or older. The gender makeup of the community was 47.4% male and 52.6% female.
