= Vinton station =

Historic railway station

Vinton
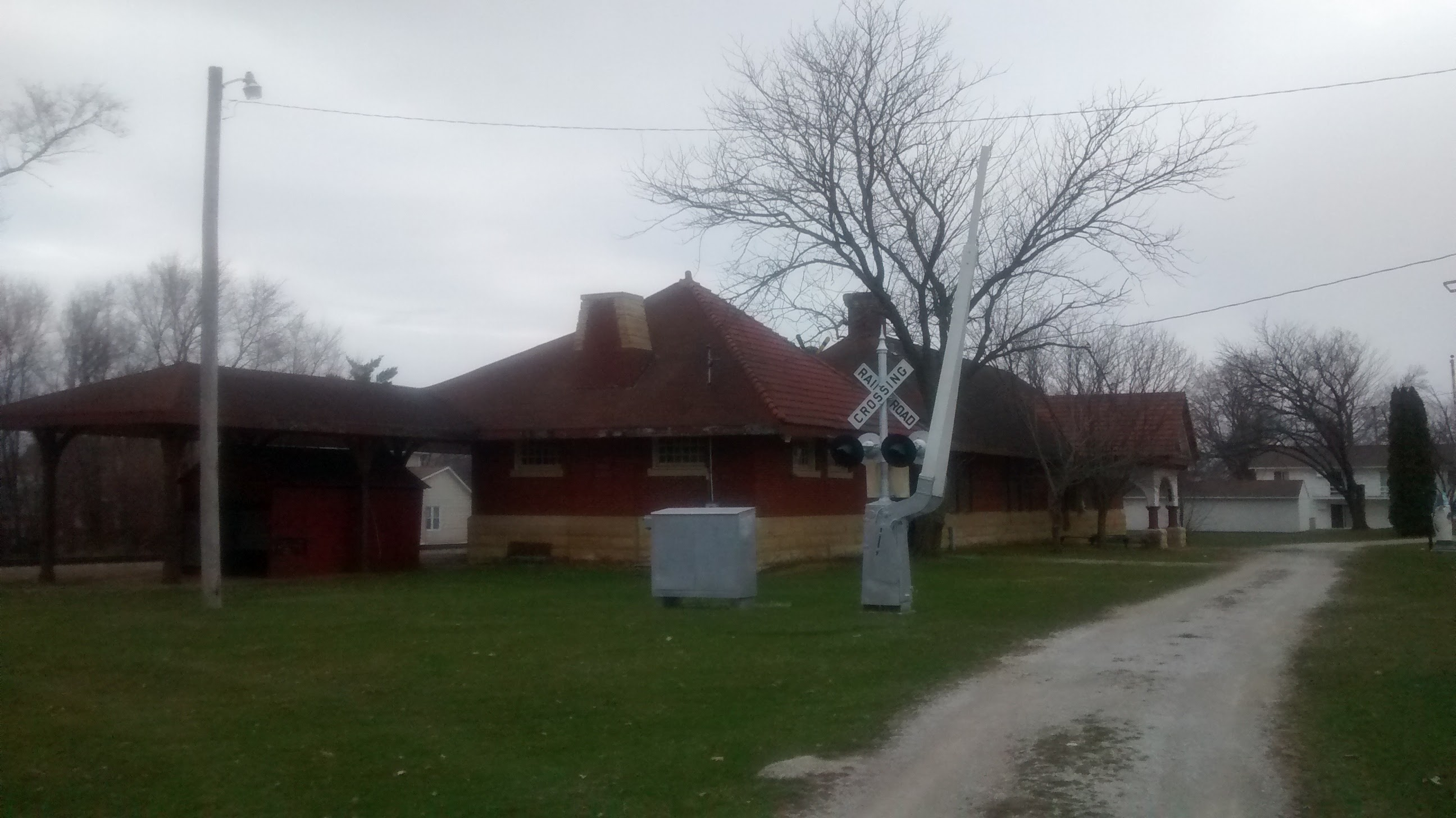
- Vinton station in March 2016.

General information
- Location: 612 Second Avenue, Vinton, Iowa 52349
- System: Former Rock Island Line passenger station
- Platforms: 1

History
- Opened: 1900
- Closed: 1967

Services
| Preceding station | Chicago, Rock Island and Pacific Railroad | Following station |
|---|---|---|
| Mount Auburn toward Minneapolis | Burlington, Cedar Rapids and Northern Railway | Shellsburg toward Burlington |
- Burlington, Cedar Rapids & Northern Passenger Station-Vinton
- U.S. National Register of Historic Places
- Location within Iowa Location within the United States
- Location: 612 2nd Ave. Vinton, Iowa
- Coordinates: 42°09′53″N 92°01′18″W
- Built: 1899-1900
- Built by: A.H. Connor
- Architect: H.F. White
- MPS: Advent & Development of Railroads in Iowa MPS
- NRHP reference No.: 90001852
- Added to NRHP: December 6, 1990
Location

The Burlington, Cedar Rapids & Northern Passenger Station-Vinton, also known as Rock Island Depot and the Vinton Depot, is a historic building located in Vinton, Iowa, United States. Completed in 1900, this depot replaced a previous depot of the Burlington, Cedar Rapids and Northern Railway (BCR&N) located on the east side of town. It was designed by the railroad's architect and chief engineer, H.F. White, and built by A.H. Connor & Company of Cedar Rapids. The single-story brick structure was constructed on a limestone foundation. Three years after it was built, the BCR&N was acquired by the Chicago, Rock Island and Pacific Railroad. It continued to serve as a working depot until 1967. The Benton County Historical Society restored the depot and converted into a railroad museum. The building was listed on the National Register of Historic Places in 1990.
