= Burlington, Cedar Rapids and Northern Railway =

Former railroad in the US

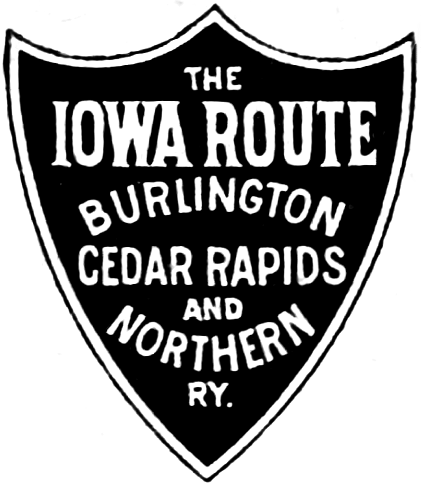

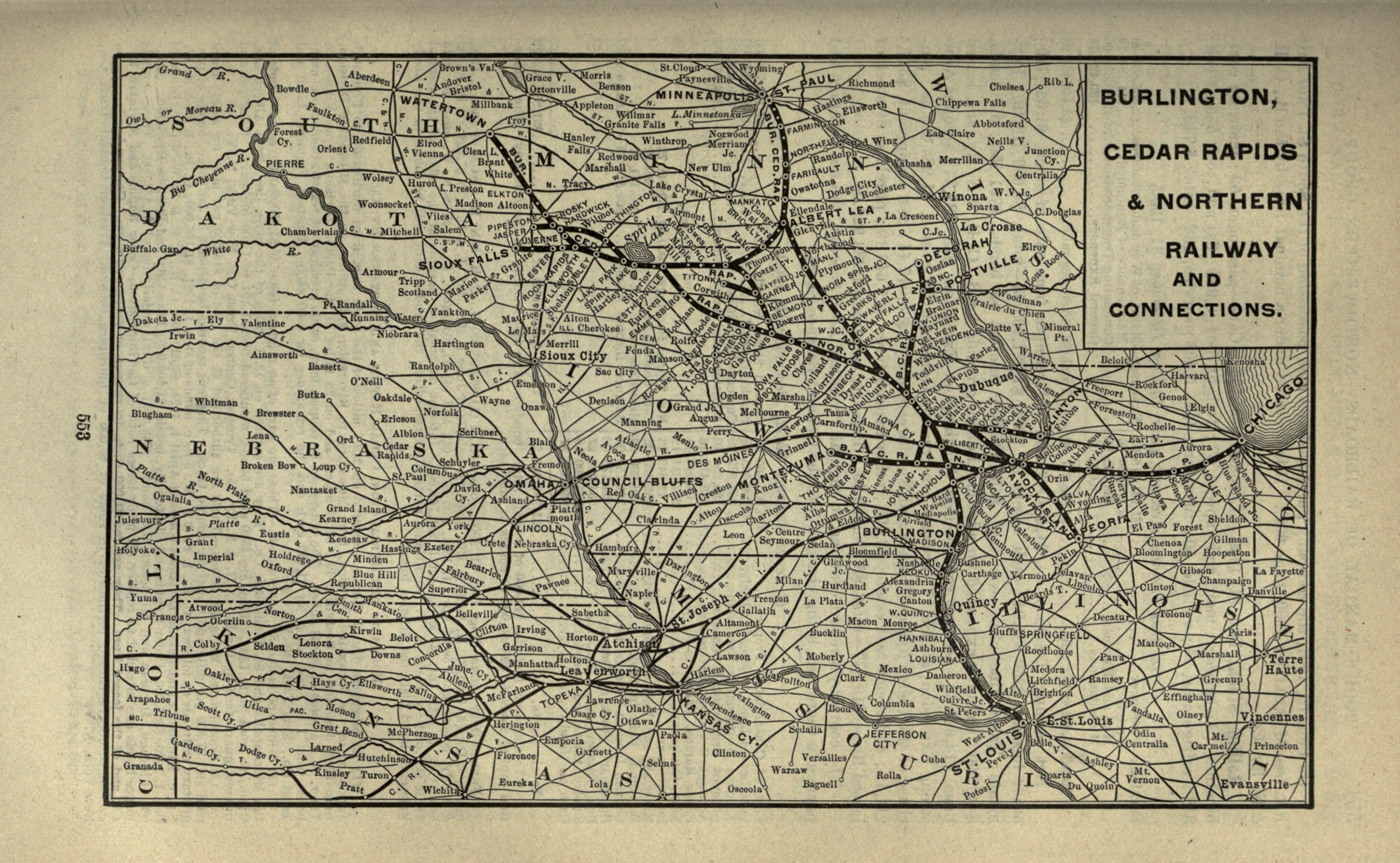

Overview
- Headquarters: Cedar Rapids, Iowa
- Locale: Iowa, Minnesota, South Dakota
- Dates of operation: 1869–1903
- Successor: CRI&P

Technical
- Track gauge: 4 ft 8 1/2 in (1,435 mm) and 3 ft (914 mm)

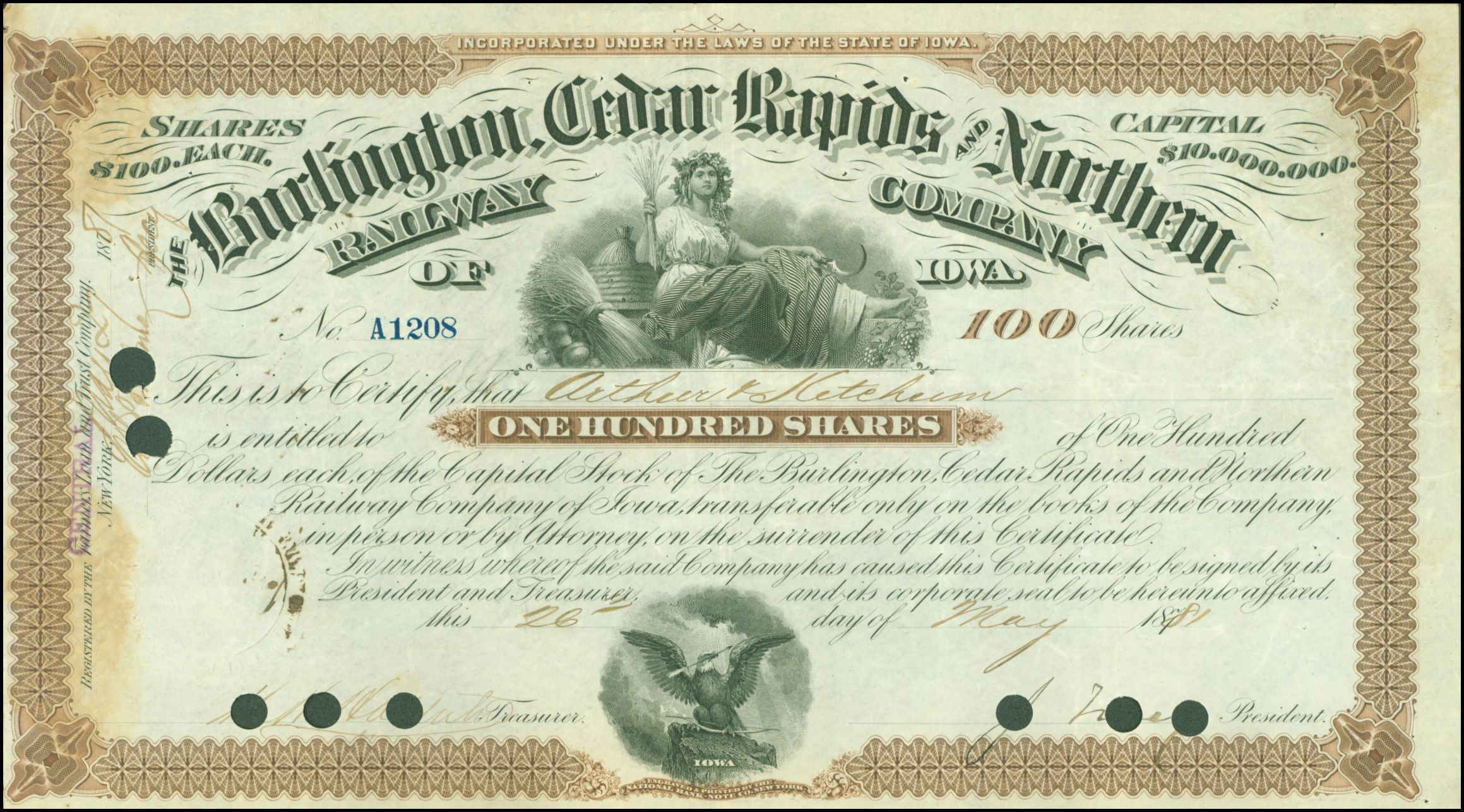
Share of the Burlington, Cedar Rapids and Northern Railway Company, issued 26. May 1881

The Burlington, Cedar Rapids and Northern Railway (BCR&N) was a railroad that operated in the United States from 1876 to 1903. It was formed to take over the operations of the bankrupt Burlington, Cedar Rapids and Minnesota Railway, which was, in turn, the result of merging several predecessor lines, the construction of which began in 1869. The corporate headquarters were in Cedar Rapids, Iowa, and it had operations in Iowa and in Minnesota. It was succeeded by the Chicago, Rock Island and Pacific Railway.

The original mainline ran from Burlington, Iowa via Cedar Rapids north to Albert Lea, Minnesota, with a perpetual lease of the 'Minneapolis Road' from there to Minneapolis. By 1882, branch lines had been built to Traer, Postville, Muscatine, Iowa City, and the coal mines of the What Cheer region, all in Iowa. Through passenger service was offered from Minneapolis to St. Louis in conjunction with the St. Louis, Keokuk and Northwestern Railroad (later part of the CB&Q).

== Dual gauge operations ==
In 1880, the Burlington Cedar Rapids and Northern granted running rights to the Burlington and Northwestern Railway from Burlington, Iowa north to Mediapolis, a distance of 13.77 miles. Since the latter line used three foot gauge until regauged in the 20th century, a third rail was put down on this stretch of mainline, converting it to dual gauge.

== Legacy ==
The last run of the Zephyr Rocket between St. Louis and Minneapolis over the former BCR&N mainline was on April 8–9, 1967. Freight service on the line from Burlington to Cedar Rapids ceased with the bankruptcy of the Chicago, Rock Island and Pacific Railroad in March 1980. In the early 1990s, the Hoover Nature Trail began acquiring the Burlington to Cedar Rapids right of way for conversion to a recreational trail.

Between Cedar Rapids and Manly, Iowa, the former mainline remains in service, operated by the Iowa Northern Railway.

Union Pacific still uses remnants of the former BCR&N branch to Sioux Falls, SD that ran off of the mainline at Vinton, IA with segments remaining between Dows and Clarion, as well as between Goldfield, IA and Superior, IA.

=== Surviving passenger facilities ===
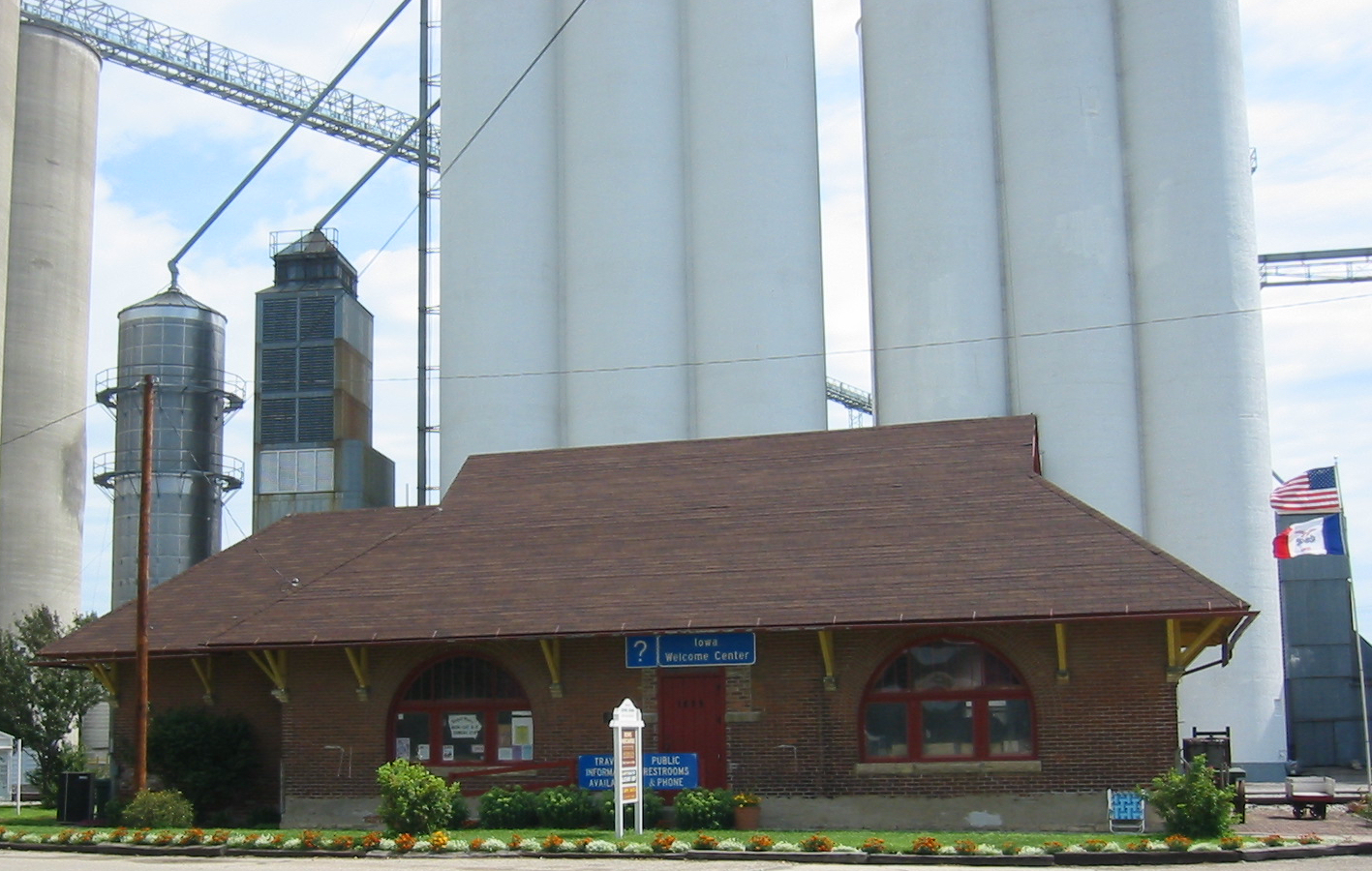
Depot in Dows, Iowa

At least eight of its stations survive:

- Station in Clarion, Iowa, listed on the National Register of Historic Places listings in Wright County, Iowa
- Depot in Dows, Iowa, listed on the National Register of Historic Places listings in Wright County, Iowa
- Depot in Greene, Iowa
- Depot in Kalona, Iowa (relocated to Kalona Historic Village).
- Depot, track and bridge in Rock Rapids, Iowa, listed on the National Register of Historic Places listings in Lyon County, Iowa
- Station in Vinton, Iowa, listed on the National Register of Historic Places listings in Benton County, Iowa
- Depot in Walker, Iowa
- Depot in Rockford, Iowa
- Depot in Pipestone, Minnesota, listed on the National Register of Historic Places listings in Pipestone County, Minnesota
- Depot in Sioux Falls, South Dakota
- Depot in Lone Tree, Iowa, now a community center

=== Other structures ===
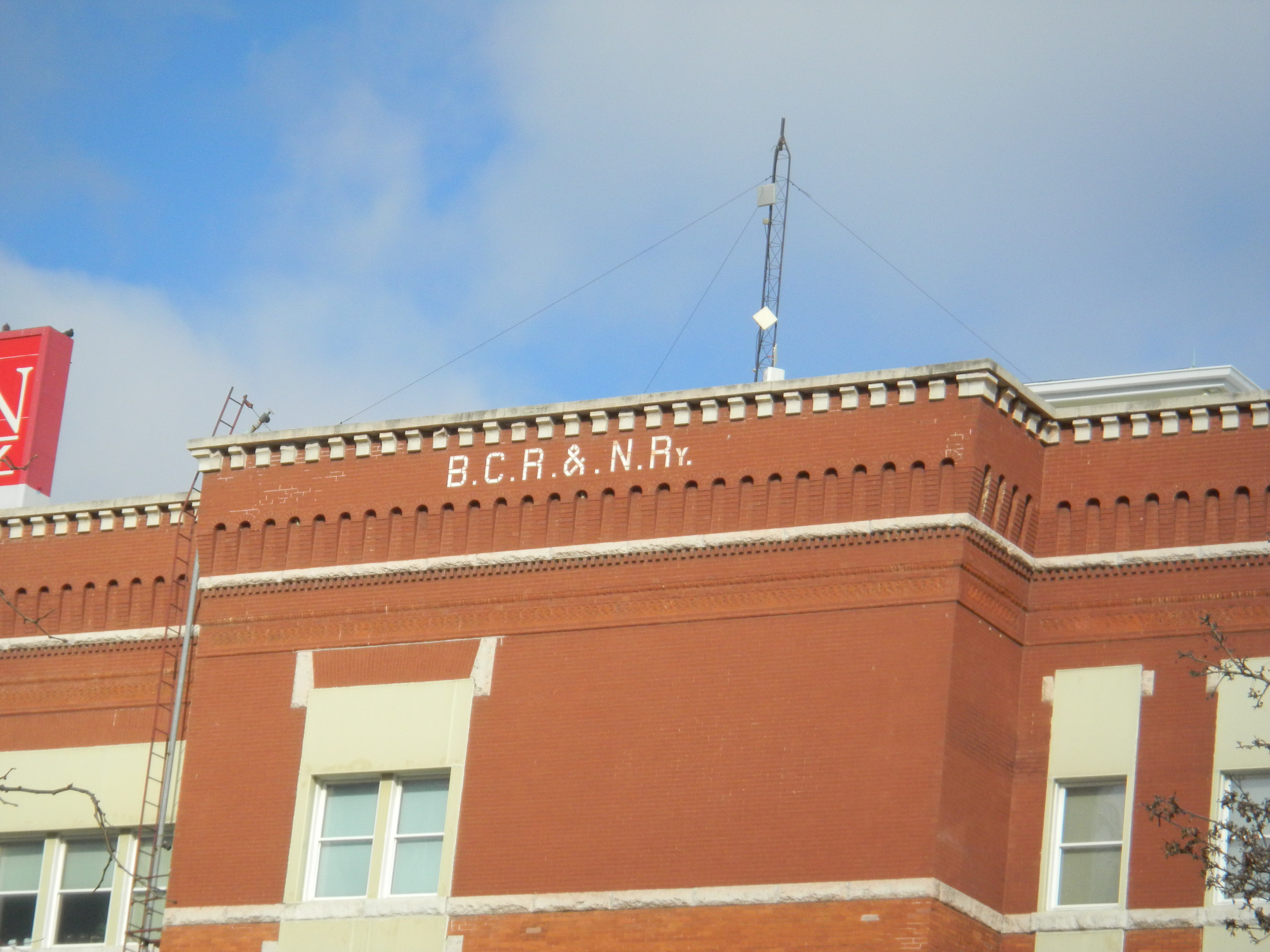
The former corporate headquarters building in Cedar Rapids, Iowa

The corporate headquarters building at 411 1st Ave. SE in Cedar Rapids still carries the BCR&N Ry initials at the top of the wall facing the tracks. The historic facade facing First Avenue, constructed in 1885, has been completely modernized. The building now serves Skogman Realty.

The former roundhouse of the Iowa City branch was still standing in Iowa City in 2010.

The former Burlington, Cedar Rapids & Northern Freight House, built in 1898 on the corner of Front and High Streets in Burlington, is now a restaurant. This building was listed on the National Register of Historic Places in 1983. During the Iowa Flood of 2008, this building was inundated with four feet of water. The construction of this freight house (replacing an earlier structure) lead to a court battle with the Burlington Gaslight Company that was ultimately decided by the US Supreme Court.

A two-span through truss bridge, composed of a Warren truss and a Lattice truss, exists in Iowa City in Napoleon Park. It is now being used by the Cedar Rapids and Iowa City Railway, albeit infrequently.

An abandoned three-span Parker through truss bridge, built circa 1890, exists over the Iowa River in Columbus Junction.

Several bridges and culverts in Cedar Rapids have been reused on the Cedar River Trail.

Several other bridges have been reused on the various portions of the Hoover Nature Trail.

A partially destroyed bridge exists in the Czech Village neighborhood of Cedar Rapids.

The Iowa Northern Railway operates across several BCRN structures, including a Warren through truss bridge over Beaver Creek northeast of Cedar Falls.

A former Burlington, Cedar Rapids & Northern deck truss bridge, built circa 1882, exists over the West Fork Des Moines River in Estherville. The bridge is still in use by the Union Pacific Railroad.
