= Iowa Canning Company Seed House Building =

- U.S. National Register of Historic Places
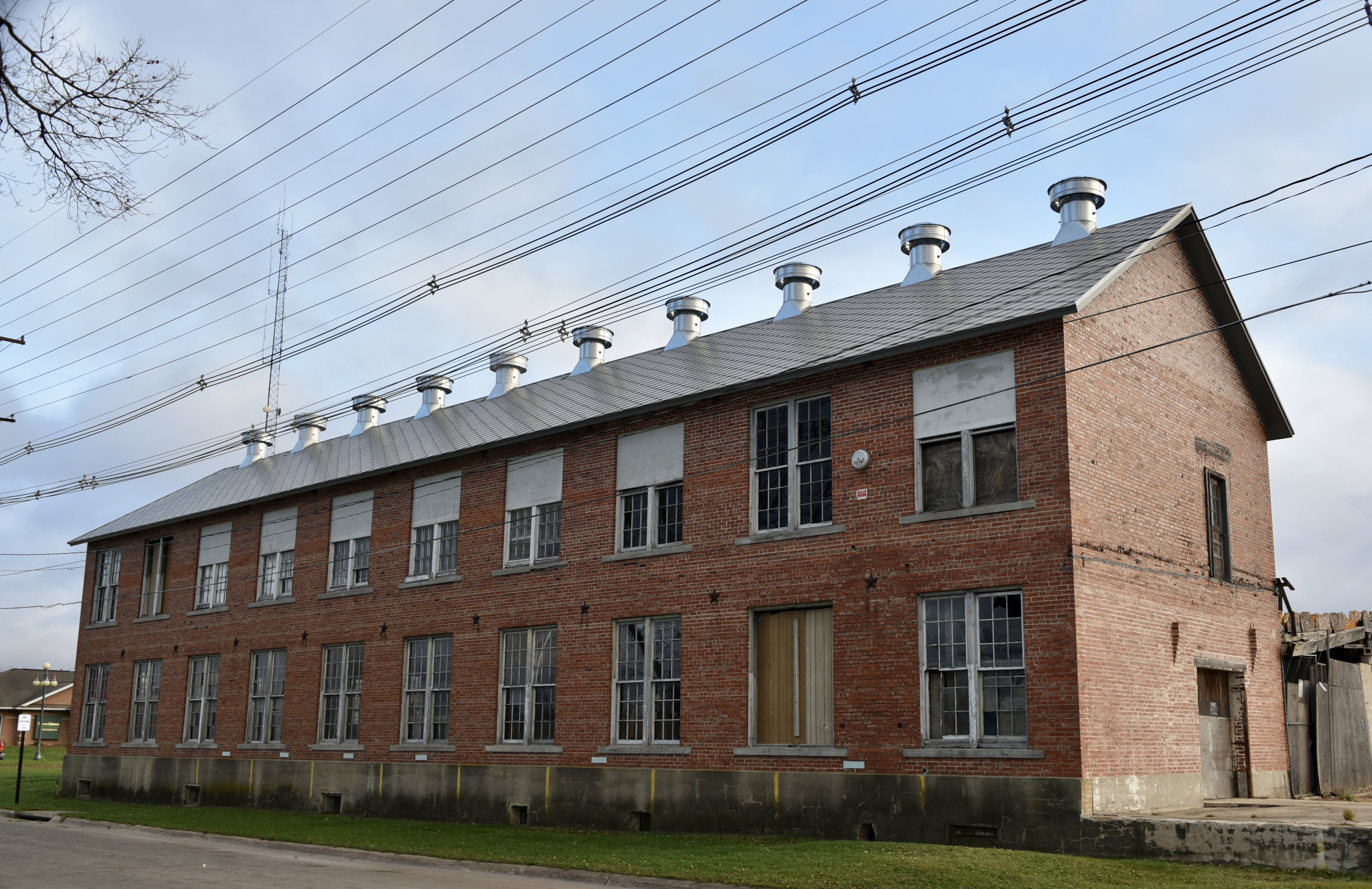

- Location within Iowa Location within the United States
- Location: 201 1st Ave. Vinton, Iowa
- Coordinates: 42°10′10″N 92°01′29″W
- Area: less than one acre
- NRHP reference No.: 12000094
- Added to NRHP: March 12, 2012

The Iowa Canning Company Seed House Building is a historic industrial building located in Vinton, Iowa, United States. The earliest available Sanborn map shows the building in 1885, and lists it as S.H. Watson Canning Company. It was known as the first corn canning operation west of the Mississippi River in the 1890s. In addition to S.H. Watson, the facility went by a variety of names throughout its history:Cedar Valley Packing Company, the Vinton Canning Company, and the Iowa Canning Company. Before World War I the operation employed 250 people at its peak, and it produced more than 3 million cans annually. Ideal Industries, who manufactured hog confinement equipment and other items, occupied the building from the mid-1980s and sold it in 2002. The structure sustained damage in the flood of 2008, and was substantially damaged in a wind storm in 2011. Much of the damage has been repaired. The building was listed on the National Register of Historic Places in 2012.
