= Amenia station (North Dakota) =

- Burlington Northern Depot
- Formerly listed on the U.S. National Register of Historic Places
- Location within North Dakota Location within the United States
- Location: Woodard Ave., Amenia, North Dakota
- Coordinates: 47°0′17″N 97°13′9″W
- Area: less than 1 acre (0.40 ha)
- Built: 1880
- Architect: Northern Pacific Railroad
- NRHP reference No.: 77001024

Significant dates
- Added to NRHP: August 29, 1977
- Removed from NRHP: December 6, 2016

Amenia station is a historic railroad station in Amenia, North Dakota, United States. It was built in 1880, and was designed and/or built by the Northern Pacific Railroad. The depot served Amenia until 1974. It was listed on the National Register of Historic Places in 1977 as the Burlington Northern Depot, and delisted in 2016.
