= Zephyr Rocket =

Passenger train operated by the CB&Q Railroad

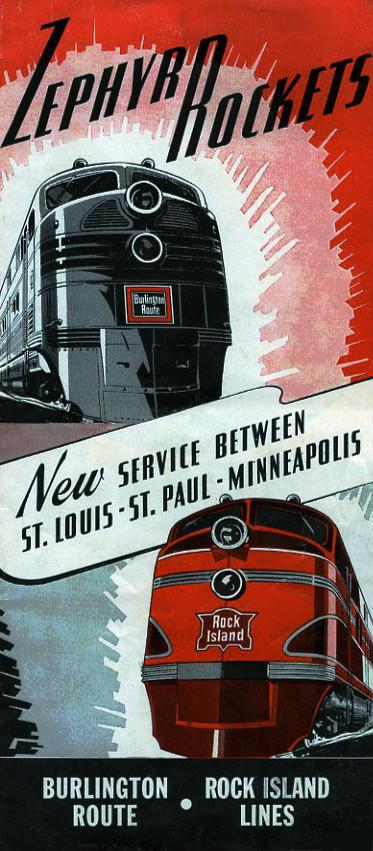
- Front of 1941 timetable

Overview
- Service type: Inter-city rail
- Status: Discontinued
- Locale: Midwestern United States
- First service: January 7, 1941
- Last service: April 8, 1967
- Former operators: Chicago, Burlington and Quincy Railroad; Chicago, Rock Island and Pacific Railroad

Route
- Termini: St. Louis, Missouri; Minneapolis, Minnesota
- Distance travelled: 586.5 miles (943.9 km)
- Service frequency: Daily
- Train numbers: 51-561 (northbound), 562-62 (southbound)

On-board services
- Seating arrangements: Reclining seat chair cars
- Sleeping arrangements: Sections, double bedrooms and drawing rooms (1949)
- Catering facilities: Observation-parlor-dining car (1949)

The Zephyr Rocket was an overnight passenger train operated jointly by the Chicago, Burlington and Quincy Railroad ("Burlington Route") and the Chicago, Rock Island and Pacific Railroad ("Rock Island Lines") between Saint Louis, Missouri and the Twin Cities of Saint Paul and Minneapolis, Minnesota, with major intermediate stops in Burlington, Cedar Rapids, and Waterloo, Iowa. The Chicago, Burlington & Quincy carried the train between St. Louis and Burlington, while the Chicago, Rock Island and Pacific carried it between Burlington and Minneapolis/St. Paul. Motive power and equipment were pooled and traveled the entire distance without change.

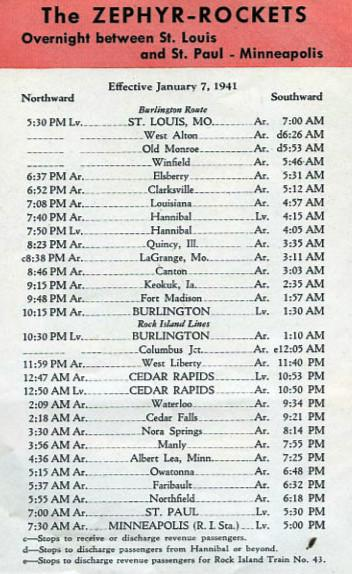
1941 Zephyr Rocket schedule

The trains, with coaches and sleeping cars, started operating on January 7, 1941. They also carried round-end observation cars with the train's name emblazoned on the rear for several years.

The train was named by combining the nicknames of the operating railroads' passenger train fleets: The passenger trains of the Burlington Route were called Zephyrs, while those of the Rock Island Lines were called Rockets, hence Zephyr Rocket.

In 1964 the train was still earning money above its direct costs, at least for the Chicago, Burlington & Quincy. In 1967 the train, by then coaches-only, was discontinued, with the last trains departing on April 8 and arriving at their respective end points the following morning.

Reinstatement of direct passenger rail service between the Twin Cities and St. Louis is infeasible on the original route, as a key part of it, between Burlington and Cedar Rapids, was abandoned when the Rock Island ceased operations in 1980. Portions of this section have been converted to bicycle/hiking trails. Although service could be run on an alternative routing (e.g. via Twin Star Rocket route; or by combining Zephyr Rocket and Twin Star Rocket routes).
