= Watertown station (South Dakota) =

Watertown
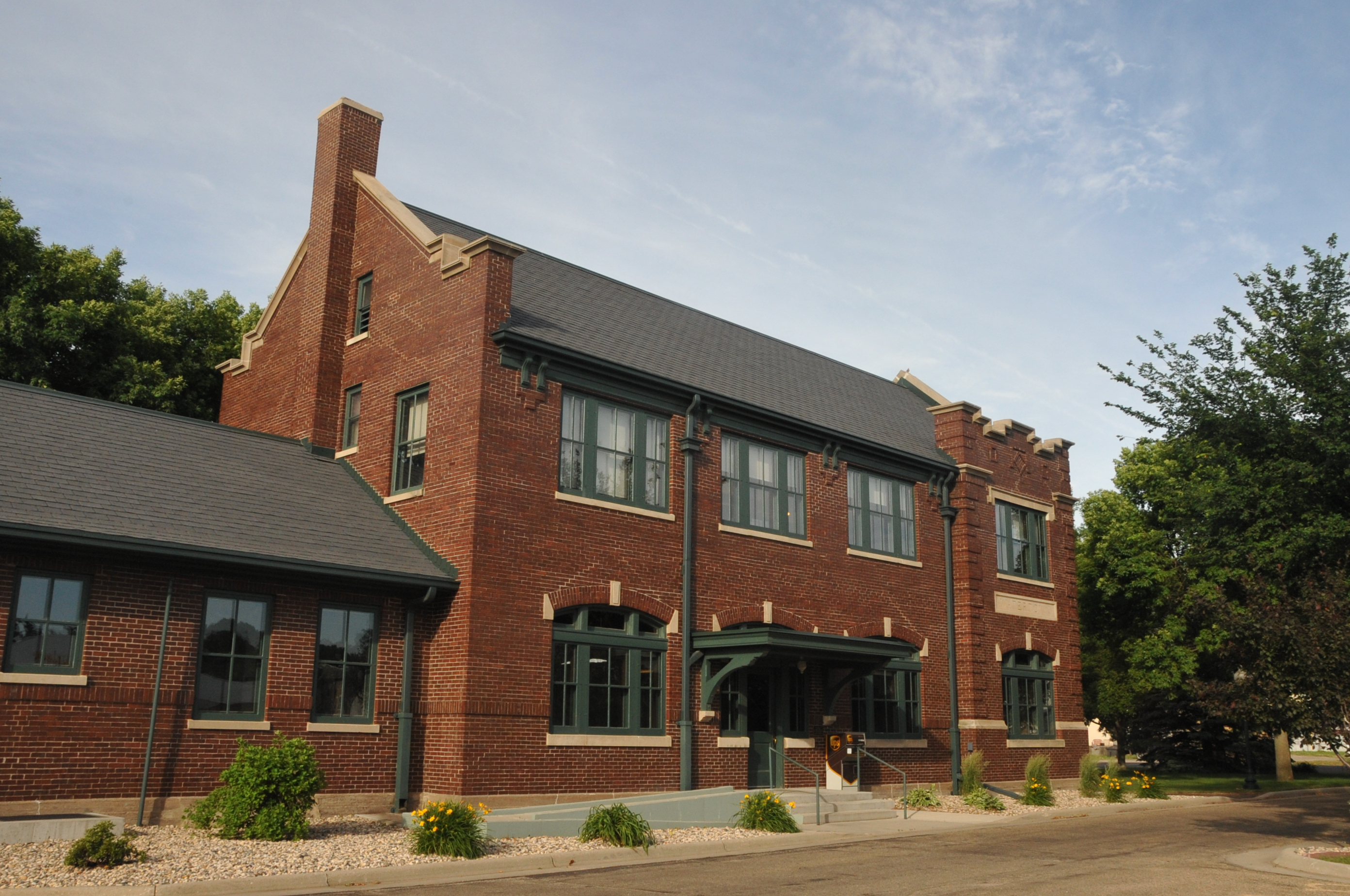
- Watertown station in July 2013.

General information
- Location: 168 N. Broadway, Watertown, South Dakota 57201
- Coordinates: 44°54′12″N 97°06′43″W
- System: Former Minneapolis & St. Louis Railway passenger rail station

History
- Opened: 1911
- Closed: July 21, 1960
- Minneapolis and St. Louis Railroad Depot
- U.S. National Register of Historic Places
- Location within South Dakota Location within the United States
- Location: 168 N. Broadway; Watertown, South Dakota
- Coordinates: 44°54′12″N 97°06′43″W
- Built: 1911
- Architect: A.T. Hawks
- NRHP reference No.: 85003477
- Added to NRHP: October 31, 1985
Location

The Minneapolis and St. Louis Railroad Depot in Watertown, South Dakota was built by the Minneapolis and St. Louis Railway (M&StL) in 1911 and served passengers until July 21, 1960.

The depot is a two story brick building with a high pitched slate gable roof and a projecting brick chimney. The Minneapolis and St. Louis Railroad began laying tracks into Watertown in 1884. Passenger service west of Watertown to Conde and Aberdeen ended on January 1, 1950. The final passenger train departed the station for Minneapolis on July 20, 1960, with the train from Minneapolis arriving in Watertown on July 21.
