= Mass media in Cedar Rapids, Iowa =

Newspapers, radio, and television in Cedar Rapids, Iowa, United States.

== Print ==
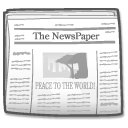

The Gazette is the primary daily newspaper for Cedar Rapids. The Cedar Rapids Gazette won a Pulitzer Prize in 1936, under editor Verne Marshall and primarily due to his efforts and articles, for its campaign against corruption and misgovernment in the State of Iowa.

== Radio ==
Start dates are for the frequency/station license, not for callsign or programming that may have moved from license to license.

=== FM ===
Freq (MHz)	Call	City	Owner	Start	ERP (W)	Nickname	Format	RDS	HD
88.3	KCCK	Cedar Rapids	Kirkwood Community College	1972	10,000	All That Jazz 88.3	Jazz	No	1
89.1	KXGM	Hiawatha	Educational Media Foundation	2002	5,800	Positive, Alternative 89.1 FM	Contemporary Christian Music	No	No
90.9	KUNI	Cedar Falls	University of Northern Iowa	1960	100,000	90.9 KUNI	News/Talk, Adult Album Alternative	Yes	1
91.7	KSUI	Iowa City	University of Iowa	1977	100,000	91.7 KSUI	Classical Music	No	2
92.3	KOEL-FM	Oelwein	Townsquare Media	1971	95,000	K92.3	Country Music	No	No
93.1	K226BO	Cedar Rapids	Ecker Broadcasting Company	2011	250	^{[t]}Classic KMRY	Classic Hits	No	No
94.1	KRNA	Iowa City	Townsquare Media	1974	100,000	Real Rock 94.1 KRNA	Classic Rock	No	No
94.7	KMCH	Manchester	Delaware County Broadcasting	1991	6,000	Mix 94.7 KMCH	Full Service	No	No
95.1	K236AA	Cedar Rapids	KZIA, Inc.	1997	230	^{[t]}Smart FM^{[Z]}	80's Hits	No	No
95.7	KOSY	Anamosa	iHeartMedia	2008	18,000	Hot 95.7	Rhythmic Contemporary	Yes	No
96.5	KKSY	Cedar Rapids	iHeartMedia	1963	100,000	96.5 Kiss Country	Country Music	Yes	No
98.1	KHAK	Cedar Rapids	Townsquare Media	1961	100,000	98.1 K-Hawk	Country Music	No	No
98.5	K253BE	Iowa City	KZIA, Inc.	2016	250	^{[t]}Smart FM^{[Z]}	80's Hits	No	No
99.3	KDST	Dyersville	Design Homes, Inc.	1984	3,000	Real Country 99.3 KDST	Country Music	No	No
99.7	KBEA	Muscatine	Townsquare Media	1949	100,000	B100	Contemporary Hit Radio	No	No
100.7	KKRQ	Iowa City	iHeartMedia	1966	100,000	100.7 The Fox	Classic Rock	Yes	No
101.5	K268CY	Cedar Rapids	iHeartMedia	2016	30	^{[t]}Leo 1360	Oldies	No	No
101.9	KNWS	Waterloo	Northwestern College	1965	100,000	Life 101.9	Contemporary Christian Music	No	No
102.3	K272GB	Cedar Rapids	KZIA, Inc.	2020	250	^{[t]}1600 The Gym	Sports Radio	No	No
102.9	KZIA	Cedar Rapids	KZIA, Inc.	1975	100,000	Z 102.9	Contemporary Hit Radio	No	4
104.5	KDAT	Cedar Rapids	Townsquare Media	1971	100,000	104.5 KDAT	Adult Contemporary Music	No	No
105.7	KOKZ	Waterloo	NRG Media	1962	100,000	105.7 KOKZ	Classic Hits	No	No
106.3	K292FZ	Iowa City	KZIA, Inc.	2007	175	^{[t]}1600 The Gym^{[Z]}	Sports Radio	No	No
107.1	KRQN	Vinton	George S. Flinn, Jr.	2002	4,700	i107.1	Contemporary Hit Radio	No	No
107.5	K298BM	Cedar Rapids	KZIA, Inc.	2007	250	^{[t]}X107.5^{[Z]}	Alternative Rock	No	No
107.9	KFMW	Waterloo	NRG Media	1968	77,000	Rock 108	Active Rock	No	No

- ^[a&t] displays artist and title on Radio Data System
- ^[t] FM translator: repeats another station's program
- ^[Z] this translator rebroadcasts the programming of a HD Radio digital subchannel of KZIA in a standard analog format

=== AM ===
Freq (kHz)	Call	City	Owner	Start	Day Power (W)	Night Power (W)	Nickname	Format	Stereo	HD
600	WMT	Cedar Rapids	iHeartMedia	1922	5,000	5,000	NewsRadio 600 WMT	News/Talk	No	No
800	KXIC	Iowa City	iHeartMedia	1960	1,000	199	AM 800 KXIC	News/Talk	No	No
910	WSUI	Iowa City	University of Iowa	1922	5,000	4,000	910 WSUI	Public Radio	No	No
1360	KMJM	Cedar Rapids	iHeartMedia	1961	1,000	124	Leo 1360	Oldies	No	No
1450	KMRY	Cedar Rapids	Ecker Broadcasting Company	1948	1,000	1,000	Classic KMRY	Classic Hits	No	No
1540	KXEL	Waterloo	NRG Media	1942	50,000	50,000	KXEL NewsTalk 1540	News/Talk	No	No
1600	KGYM	Cedar Rapids	KZIA, Inc.	1947	5,000	5,000	1600 The Gym	Sports Radio	No	No
1630	KCJJ	Iowa City	River City Radio, Inc.	1982	10,000	1,000	The Mighty 1630 KCJJ	Hot Adult Contemporary	No	No
1650	KCNZ	Cedar Falls	Fife Communication Company LLC	1998	10,000	1,000	1650 The Fan KCNZ	Sports Radio	No	No

== Television ==
Virt. Ch.	Call	City	Owner	Operator	Start	Digital Ch.	DTV	Nickname	Programming
2.1	KGAN	Cedar Rapids	Sinclair Broadcast Group	Sinclair Broadcast Group	1953	29	720p	CBS 2	CBS
2.2	KGAN	Cedar Rapids	Sinclair Broadcast Group	Sinclair Broadcast Group	1953	29	720p	Fox 28	Fox
2.3	KGAN	Cedar Rapids	Sinclair Broadcast Group	Sinclair Broadcast Group	1953	29	480i	Quest	Quest
7.1	KWWL	Waterloo	Allen Media Broadcasting	Allen Media Broadcasting	1953	7	1080i	NewsChannel 7	NBC
7.2	KWWL	Waterloo	Allen Media Broadcasting	Allen Media Broadcasting	1953	7	720p	H&I 7.2	Heroes & Icons
7.3	KWWL	Waterloo	Allen Media Broadcasting	Allen Media Broadcasting	1953	7	480i	Me-TV 7.3	MeTV
7.4	KWWL	Waterloo	Allen Media Broadcasting	Allen Media Broadcasting	1953	7	480i	CourtTV	Court TV
7.5	KWWL	Waterloo	Allen Media Broadcasting	Allen Media Broadcasting	1953	7	480i	TruCrim	True Crime Network
9.1	KCRG	Cedar Rapids	Gray Television	Gray Television	1953	9	720p	KCRG-TV 9	ABC
9.2	KCRG	Cedar Rapids	Gray Television	Gray Television	1953	9	720p	My 9.2	MyNetworkTV
9.3	KCRG	Cedar Rapids	Gray Television	Gray Television	1953	9	720p	The CW 9.3	The CW
12.1	KIIN	Iowa City	Iowa Public Broadcasting Board	Iowa Public Broadcasting Board	1939	12	1080i	IPBS HD	PBS
12.2	KIIN	Iowa City	Iowa Public Broadcasting Board	Iowa Public Broadcasting Board	1939	12	480i	IPBS Kids	PBS Kids
12.3	KIIN	Iowa City	Iowa Public Broadcasting Board	Iowa Public Broadcasting Board	1939	12	480i	IPBS World	World
12.4	KIIN	Iowa City	Iowa Public Broadcasting Board	Iowa Public Broadcasting Board	1939	12	480i	IPBS Create	Create
20.1	KWKB	Iowa City	TCT	TCT	1999	25	720p	TCT	TCT
20.2	KWKB	Iowa City	TCT	TCT	1999	25	480i	Ion Mystery	Ion Mystery
20.3	KWKB	Iowa City	TCT	TCT	1999	25	480i	SBN	Sonlife
20.4	KWKB	Iowa City	TCT	TCT	1999	25	480i	Start	Start TV
20.5	KWKB	Iowa City	TCT	TCT	1999	25	480i	CHSN	Chicago Sports Network
20.9	KWKB	Iowa City	TCT	TCT	1999	25	480i	GetTV	Get
28.1	KFXA	Cedar Rapids	Second Generation of Iowa, Ltd.	Sinclair Broadcast Group	1988	27	480i	Dabl 28	Dabl
28.2	KFXA	Cedar Rapids	Second Generation of Iowa, Ltd.	Sinclair Broadcast Group	1988	27	480i	Charge!	Charge!
28.3	KFXA	Cedar Rapids	Second Generation of Iowa, Ltd.	Sinclair Broadcast Group	1988	27	480i	Roar	Roar
28.4	KFXA	Cedar Rapids	Second Generation of Iowa, Ltd.	Sinclair Broadcast Group	1988	27	480i	The Nest	The Nest
28.5	KFXA	Cedar Rapids	Second Generation of Iowa, Ltd.	Sinclair Broadcast Group	1988	27	480i	Comet	Comet
32.1	KRIN	Waterloo	Iowa Public Broadcasting Board	Iowa Public Broadcasting Board	1974	35	1080i	IPBS HD	PBS
32.2	KRIN	Waterloo	Iowa Public Broadcasting Board	Iowa Public Broadcasting Board	1974	35	480i	IPBS Kids	PBS Kids
32.3	KRIN	Waterloo	Iowa Public Broadcasting Board	Iowa Public Broadcasting Board	1974	35	480i	IPBS World	World
32.4	KRIN	Waterloo	Iowa Public Broadcasting Board	Iowa Public Broadcasting Board	1974	35	480i	IPBS Create	Create
40.1	KFXB	Dubuque	Christian Television Network	Christian Television Network	1976	14	480p	CTN 40	CTN
40.2	KFXB	Dubuque	Christian Television Network	Christian Television Network	1976	14	480p	Lifesty	CTN Lifestyle
40.3	KFXB	Dubuque	Christian Television Network	Christian Television Network	1976	14	480p	CTNi	CTNi
48.1	KPXR	Cedar Rapids	Ion Media Networks	Ion Media Networks	1997	22	720p	Ion 48	Ion Television
48.2	KPXR	Cedar Rapids	Ion Media Networks	Ion Media Networks	1997	22	480i	Grit	Grit
48.3	KPXR	Cedar Rapids	Ion Media Networks	Ion Media Networks	1997	22	480i	Bounce TV	Bounce TV
48.4	KPXR	Cedar Rapids	Ion Media Networks	Ion Media Networks	1997	22	480i	Laff	Laff
48.5	KPXR	Cedar Rapids	Ion Media Networks	Ion Media Networks	1997	22	480i	Ion Plus	Ion Plus
48.6	KPXR	Cedar Rapids	Ion Media Networks	Ion Media Networks	1997	22	480i	Busted	Busted
48.7	KPXR	Cedar Rapids	Ion Media Networks	Ion Media Networks	1997	22	480i	Game Show Central	Game Show Central
48.8	KPXR	Cedar Rapids	Ion Media Networks	Ion Media Networks	1997	22	480i	HSN	HSN
48.9	KPXR	Cedar Rapids	Ion Media Networks	Ion Media Networks	1997	22	480i	QVC	QVC
