= WMT =

WMT may refer to:

- Nasdaq stock ticker for Walmart
- Zunyi Maotai Airport, IATA code WMT
- Warsaw mean time
- WMT (AM), an AM radio station (600 kHz) in Cedar Rapids, Iowa, United States
- KOSY-FM, an FM radio station (95.7 MHz) in Anamosa, Iowa, United States branded as "WMT-FM" and simulcasting WMT (AM)
- KKSY-FM, an FM radio station (96.5 MHz) in Cedar Rapids, Iowa, United States, which held the call sign WMT-FM from 1963 to 2012
- KGAN, a television station (channel 2 analog/29 digital) licensed to Cedar Rapids, Iowa, United States, which held the call sign WMT-TV from 1953 to 1981
- West Midlands Trains, a train operator in England
- World Masterpiece Theater, a series of anime series
