= KWWL (disambiguation) =

KWWL may refer to:

- KWWL (TV), a television station (channel 7 digital/virtual) licensed to serve Waterloo, Iowa, United States
- KPTY (AM), an AM radio station (1330 AM) licensed to serve Waterloo, Iowa, which held the call sign KWWL from 1947 to 1980
- KFMW, an FM radio station (107.9 FM) licensed to serve Waterloo, Iowa, which previously held the KWWL-FM callsign
