= KCRG =

KCRG may refer to:

- The Gazette (Cedar Rapids), a newspaper in Cedar Rapids, Iowa, United States, and the namesake and founding owner of the KCRG broadcasting stations in Cedar Rapids
  - KCRG-TV, a television station (Channel 9 digital/virtual) licensed to Cedar Rapids, Iowa, United States
  - KGYM, an AM radio station (1600 kHz) licensed to Cedar Rapids, Iowa, United States, which held the call sign KCRG until 2006
- the ICAO code for Jacksonville Executive at Craig Airport in Jacksonville, Florida, United States
