= 1961 in radio =

The year 1961 in radio involved some significant events.

== Events ==
- March 7 – Los Angeles station KLAC begins FM broadcasting as KLAC-FM.
- April 1 – The Zenith Radio FM Stereo standard is authorized for US FM stations by the FCC.
- April 12: 07:00 UTC – Soviet announcer Yuri Levitan broadcasts news of Yuri Gagarin's Vostok 1 mission, the first human spaceflight, on Radio Moscow while it is still in progress.
- October 8 – The BBC Home Service in the United Kingdom first broadcasts In Touch; the world's first national radio programme for people who are blind; it will still be running in 2021.

== Debuts ==
- February 11 – KSHE debuts as a female-oriented rock station in St. Louis, Missouri.
- April 12 – WLKW/990-Providence, Rhode Island signs on as Rhode Island's only 50 kW A.M. station.
- June 25 – WPLM-FM/99.1-Plymouth, Massachusetts signs on.
- KHAK-AM and KHAK-FM, Cedar Rapids, Iowa, sign on at 1360 AM and 98.1 FM, respectively. Although formatting country music, neither station is exclusively country until some point later in 1960s.
- WIBC-FM in Indianapolis, Indiana signs on the air.
- WNOR, an Active Rock station in the Hampton Roads area of the United States, has its debut.
- WKFD/1370-Wickford, Rhode Island begins broadcasting.
- Lohman and Barkley, a radio talk show featuring Al Lohman and Roger Barkley, begins on KLAC in Los Angeles and runs on several stations until 1986.
- October 23 – WAMU is established as an FM station and part of the Educational Radio Network, in Washington, D.C.
- December 23 - WURV signs on as WFMV in Richmond, Virginia.

== Births ==
- February 25 – Todd Blackledge, American sports radio host, previously NFL player
- March 4 – Tom Churchill, Iowa-based radio and television weatherman, inventor of the Digital Weatherman, a computer automation system
- March 14 – Gary Dell'Abate, American radio producer (The Howard Stern Show)
- April 26 – Anthony Cumia, American radio personality (The Anthony Cumia Show, previously of The Opie and Anthony Show)
- September 29 – Stephanie Miller, American comedian and radio talk show host (The Stephanie Miller Show)
- October 25 – Pat Sharp, English radio DJ and children's television host
- December 30 – Sean Hannity, American talk radio host and conservative commentator

== Deaths ==
- January 30 – Dorothy Thompson, American journalist and radio commentator (born 1893)
- April 21 – Wallace Greenslade, English radio announcer (born 1912)
- October 22 – L. Stanton Jefferies, English musician and radio producer (born 1896)
