= KXGM =

KXGM may refer to:

- KXGM (FM), a radio station (89.1 FM) licensed to Hiawatha, Iowa
- KXGM (AM), a defunct radio station (850 AM) formerly licensed to Waterloo, Iowa
