= WDBQ =

WDBQ may refer to:

- WDBQ (AM), a radio station (1490 AM) licensed to Dubuque, Iowa, United States
- WDBQ-FM, a radio station (107.5 FM) licensed to Galena, Illinois, United States
