= KWOF =

KWOF may refer to:

- KWOF (FM), a radio station (106.3 FM) licensed to serve Waukomis, Oklahoma, United States
- KKSE-FM, a radio station (92.5 FM) licensed to serve Broomfield, Colorado, United States, which held the call sign KWOF from 2009 to 2018
- KXGM (FM), a radio station (89.1 FM) licensed to serve Hiawatha, Iowa, United States, which held the call sign KWOF-FM from 2002 to 2008
- KXGM (AM), a defunct radio station (850 AM) licensed to serve Waterloo, Iowa, which held the call sign KWOF from 1985 to 2008
