= AFLAC Tower =

Communication tower in Iowa, United States

Coordinates: 42°24′2.0″N 91°50′37.0″W

AFLAC Tower is a tall guyed mast located in Rowley, Iowa, in the United States. AFLAC Tower (which is named for the former owner of KWWL) was completed in July 1984, and is 1,999 feet (609 m) tall with appurtenances and 1,866 feet (569 m) without appurtenances. The antenna appurtenance is 133 feet (41 m) tall.

Television station KWWL and radio stations KFMW and KNWS-FM broadcast from this tower. The transmitter site is owned by KWWL's current owner, Allen Media Broadcasting.

The KWWL transmitter site building features running water and a shower, allowing someone to maintain at least rudimentary living conditions. The site has a backup generator for KWWL's digital channel along with KNWS, but not for their analog signal or KFMW.

== See also ==
- Tallest structures in the U.S.
- List of the world's tallest structures
