= Hotel Russell-Lamson =

- U.S. National Register of Historic Places
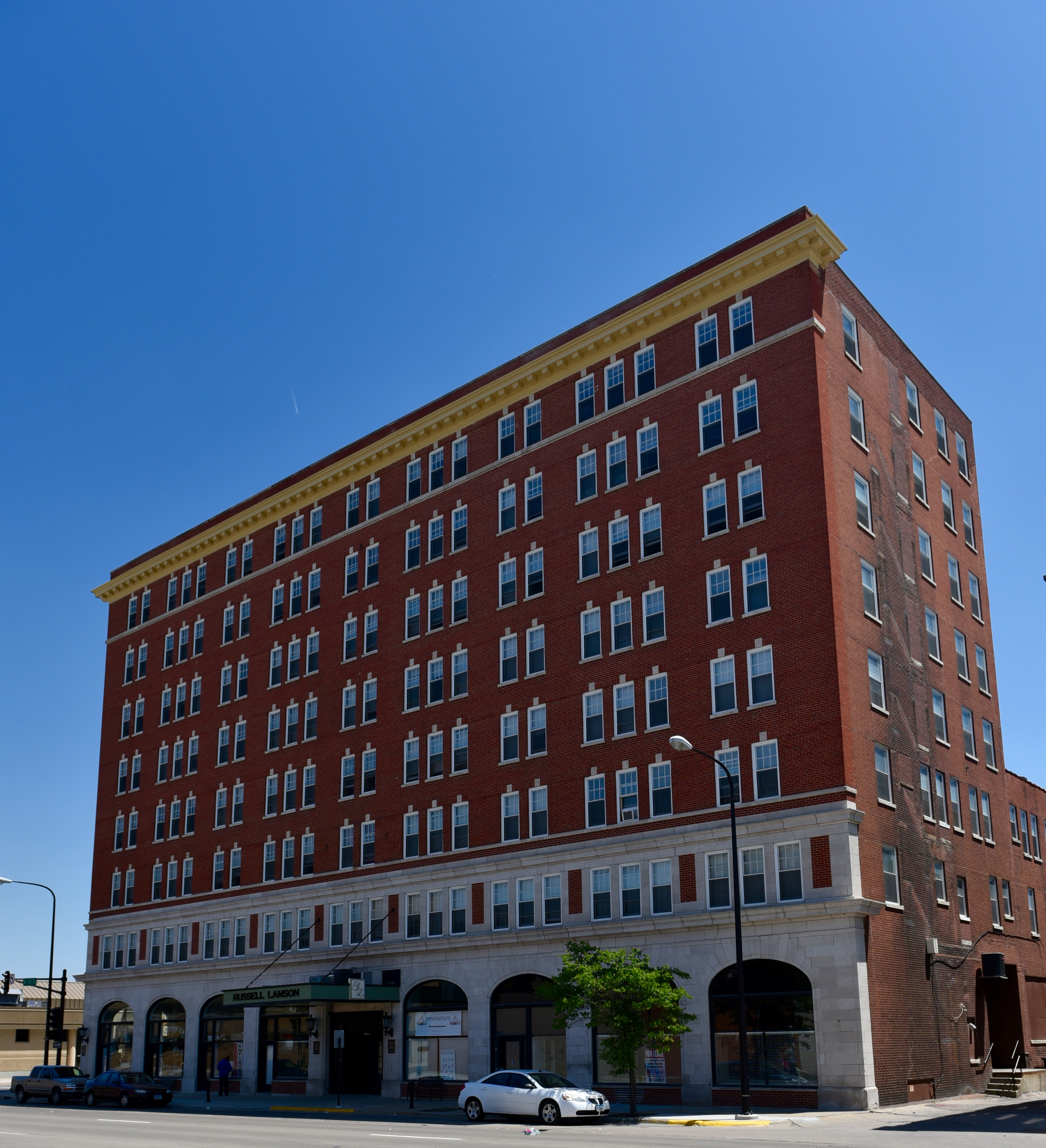

- Location within Iowa Location within the United States
- Location: 201-215 W. 5th St. Waterloo, Iowa
- Coordinates: 42°29′39″N 92°20′19″W
- Area: less than one acre
- Built: 1912-1914
- Architect: Marshall & Fox
- Architectural style: Colonial Revival
- MPS: Waterloo MPS
- NRHP reference No.: 88001324
- Added to NRHP: November 29, 1988

The Hotel Russell-Lamson is a historic building located in Waterloo, Iowa, United States. Clyde O. Lamson, a real estate developer, and his wife Lillian Russell Lamson were instrumental in the construction of the hotel. Completed in 1914, it uses their family names for its name. The Chicago architectural firm of Marshall & Fox designed the eight-story Georgian Revival building. It utilizes the base-shaft-capital configuration that is typical for this building type. The base is composed of rusticated Bedford limestone, which extends to the mezzanine level. The shaft is six floors of red brick veneer. It contrasts with the limestone trim. The capital is a rather simple cornice composed of moldings and a row of dentils.

From 1919 to 1921 the hotel became the home of the Greater Waterloo Association. It was the result of a merger of four organizations that had worked separately to improve and develop the city. Black Hawk Broadcasting Company established radio station KWWL in the hotel in 1947, and television station KWWL in 1953. Studios for both stations were located in the hotel until 1958. The building was listed on the National Register of Historic Places in 1988. The 250-room hotel has been converted into a 90-unit apartment building.
