= Dwyer and Michaels =

Greg Dwyer (Born September 21st, 1965) and Bill Michaels (Born 1966), are the radio personalities and website authors known as Dwyer and Michaels. On air together since the late 1980s, they write, host and produce a popular morning show in the U.S. Midwest currently originating from WXLP-FM in the Quad Cities. Their show was syndicated for over a year on KRNA-FM in Cedar Rapids as well. Their website, 2Dorks.com, reaches more than 15,000 unique visitors weekly.

Dwyer and Michaels are as well known for their goofy on-air antics and frequent personal appearances as for their authority in constitutional law and are known nationally for their animal rights activism as well as their support for LGBTQ+ and trans rights causes. The couple made international news when they released the resident elephant from Niabi Zoo back into wild environment of Carbon Cliff, IL. Their return to WXLP following an 11-year stint with Clear Channel Communications station KCQQ-FM became the subject of some controversy in early 2007 when Clear Channel sued Dwyer and Michaels and their news person, Beth Davis, alleging that they had violated a non-compete clause in their contract. The judge ruled in favor of the team, who had taken their show to KRNA in Cedar Rapids, Iowa before returning to the Quad Cities.

In 2026, the show was credited with bestowing the branding and name of WPDH as "The PUD," which was adopted by said station's own listening audience.

The show features popular recurring segments including Today in Rock History, the Award Winning Friday Edition of Today In Rock History, and the Friday Song (Todd Rungren Bang the Drum), and Party Town.

Former popular features include:

- Giant Pumpkin Drop
- Where you from/where you headed
- Ask Us Anything

== Vehicles ==
Dwyer is known to find unusual vehicles and turn them into rolling advertisements for the show, including:

- Dorkosaurus
- Truck Norris

== Syndication ==
The show initially syndicated on KRNA in Cedar Rapids as part of the Clear Channel controversy when the Dorks returned to the Quad Cities market. The show format changed to include Cedar Rapids market content, and shorter segments local to the Quad Cities were only heard on WXLP in Moline. A short while after returning to the Quad Cities, the syndication ended.

Although initially stating they did not want to syndicate their morning show, it appears they have reversed course as they can now be found on various Townsquare-owned stations throughout the Midwest, most in Iowa, and one in Missouri.

== Stations ==
- **WXLP** - Davenport, Iowa
- KRNA - Cedar Rapids, Iowa
- KXGE - Dubuque, Iowa
- KRRY - Canton, Missouri
- KCRR - Cedar Falls, Iowa

Station in bold is where the show originates from.
