= Ron Steele =

Ron Steele may refer to:

- Ron Steele (news anchor) (fl. 1970s–2020s), American local news anchor
- Ron Steele (ski jumper) (born 1953), American ski jumper
