= KKSY-FM =

- Cedar Rapids, Iowa; United States
- Broadcast area: Eastern Iowa
- Frequency: 96.5 MHz
- Branding: 96.5 Kiss Country

Programming
- Format: Country
- Affiliations: Premiere Networks

Ownership
- Owner: iHeartMedia, Inc.; (iHM Licenses, LLC)
- Sister stations: KKRQ; KMJM; KOSY-FM; KXIC; WMT

History
- First air date: February 27, 1963
- Former call signs: WMT-FM (1963–2012)
- Call sign meaning: "Kiss Country"

Technical information
- Licensing authority: FCC
- Facility ID: 73594
- Class: C1
- ERP: 100,000 watts
- HAAT: 158 meters (518 ft)
- Transmitter coordinates: 42°1′40″N 91°38′25″W

Links
- Public license information: Public file; LMS
- Webcast: Listen live (via iHeartRadio)
- Website: 965kisscountry.iheart.com

KKSY-FM (96.5 MHz "Kiss Country") is a commercial FM radio station in Cedar Rapids, Iowa. It broadcasts a country music radio format and is owned by iHeartMedia, Inc. KKSY carries the syndicated Bobby Bones Show in morning drive time and After Midnite with Granger Smith overnight.

KKSY-FM has an effective radiated power (ERP) of 100,000 watts, the maximum for most FM stations. The transmitter tower and studios are on Old Marion Road and Collins Road NE (Iowa Highway 100) in Cedar Rapids, co-located with the tower for KGAN channel 2.

== History ==
=== Easy listening and beautiful music ===
The station signed on the air on February 27, 1963, as WMT-FM, the sister station to WMT (600 AM), the oldest station in Cedar Rapids, Iowa. At first, the two stations simulcast. By the late 1960s, WMT-FM had its own format featuring easy listening, jazz and classical music. There were 90-minute classical music segments in the morning and evening with regular programs of jazz and show tunes from Broadway musicals. Some of those early announcers were Keith Webster, Bill Dutcher, Don John Ross, Bill Grubbe, and Jim Wicks, as well as other WMT announcers who took the helm of hosting on FM. WMT-FM would simulcast the 15-minute newscasts of WMT AM several times a day.

In the 1970s, WMT-FM became a full-time beautiful music station. It played quarter hour sweeps of instrumental music, with some Hollywood and Broadway show tunes.

=== Adult contemporary ===
In an effort to sound younger, WMT-FM added more soft vocals to its easy listening format, as the audience for beautiful music was aging. WMT-FM switched to an adult contemporary format in 1982, and became the dominant AC station for the Cedar Rapids market. The amount of adult contemporary stations in the Cedar Rapids market (excluding Waterloo) was upgraded from one to three, when WMT AM flipped from MOR to adult contemporary in 1986, and KCRG returned to its adult contemporary format after a nearly three-year hiatus in January 1987. Both WMT and KCRG's adult contemporary formats did not last long, as WMT-FM became the only (and dominant) AC station in the Cedar Rapids market after WMT AM flipped back to MOR in late 1988 and KCRG flipped to oldies in 1989.

WMT-FM's studios have been located at Broadcast Park on Collins Road in Cedar Rapids, along with WMT and TV station KGAN (the former WMT-TV), since it signed on. Until the 1970s, the studios of WMT radio were located on the fifth floor of the historic Paramount Theatre building in downtown Cedar Rapids. It was one of the few stations with a callsign beginning with W located west of the Mississippi River.

By the early 2000s, WMT-FM stepped up the tempo of its playlist and transitioned to hot AC. The station was known for its "time warp weekends" and long-standing tradition of being heavily involved in the Cedar Rapids community. The station hosted "Uptown Friday Nights" every Friday night in downtown Cedar Rapids. WMT-FM often joined up with WMT for special promotional events, and simulcasts during severe weather conditions.

=== Country music ===
WMT-FM ended its longtime hot adult contemporary format on December 27, 2011. Its owner, Clear Channel Communications, transferred the country format from co-owned KKSY 95.7 FM, to 96.5 MHz. The call sign on 96.5 was changed to KKSY-FM. For several weeks, there was a temporary simulcast period. The 95.7 facility began to simulcast WMT on January 2, 2012, and eventually took the KWMG call letters on January 17, 2012.

In 2014, Clear Channel changed its name to iHeartMedia, Inc. As an iHeart Country station, KKSY carries The Bobby Bones Show Monday through Saturday mornings from Nashville. In overnights, KKSY carries After Midnite with Granger Smith. Both shows are syndicated by co-owned Premiere Networks.
