= KLYV =

- Dubuque, Iowa; United States
- Broadcast area: Dubuque, Iowa
- Frequency: 105.3 MHz
- Branding: Y105

Programming
- Format: Top 40 (CHR)
- Affiliations: Compass Media Networks

Ownership
- Owner: Townsquare Media; (Townsquare License, LLC)
- Sister stations: KXGE, WDBQ, WDBQ-FM, WJOD

History
- First air date: September 1, 1965
- Former call signs: WDBQ-FM (1965–1974); KIWI (1974–1982)

Technical information
- Licensing authority: FCC
- Facility ID: 12717
- Class: C2
- ERP: 50,000 watts
- HAAT: 106 meters (348 ft)
- Transmitter coordinates: 42.503°N 90.707°W

Links
- Public license information: Public file; LMS
- Webcast: Listen live
- Website: y105music.com

KLYV (105.3 FM) is a radio station broadcasting a top 40 (CHR) format branded as Y105, serving the Dubuque, Iowa, United States, area. The station is owned by Townsquare Media and licensed to Townsquare License, LLC.

The station has been a "typical" Top 40 station since 1982, and a CHR station since 1986. The station first went under the formats of MOR in the 1970s, and beautiful music beginning in 1980. The station dropped the beautiful music format in 1982 for an AOR-leaning Top 40 format, and its KIWI call letters changed to KLYV. Its AOR-lean dropped in 1986 when more contemporary titles were added.

On August 30, 2013, a deal was announced in which Cumulus Media would swap its stations in Dubuque (including KLYV) and Poughkeepsie, New York, to Townsquare Media in exchange for Peak Broadcasting's stations in Fresno, California. The deal was part of Cumulus' acquisition of Dial Global; Townsquare, Peak, and Dial Global were all controlled by Oaktree Capital Management. The sale to Townsquare was completed on November 14, 2013. From March 2022 to October 2026, the flagship program was the morning show, hosted by Steve Pulaski.
