= KRQN =

Radio station in Vinton, Iowa

- Vinton, Iowa; United States
- Broadcast area: Cedar Rapids metropolitan area
- Frequency: 107.1 MHz
- Branding: Radio Pig

Programming
- Format: Classic hits

Ownership
- Owner: George S. Flinn, Jr.
- Operator: Gorilla Broadcasting Company

History
- First air date: 2005 (as KROJ)
- Former call signs: KROJ (2002–2006)

Technical information
- Licensing authority: FCC
- Facility ID: 89113
- Class: A
- ERP: 4,700 watts
- HAAT: 113 meters (371 ft)
- Transmitter coordinates: 42°8′56″N 91°52′50″W

Links
- Public license information: Public file; LMS
- Webcast: Listen live
- Website: radiopig.com

KRQN (107.1 FM) is a radio station broadcasting a classic hits format. Licensed to Vinton, Iowa, United States, the station serves the Cedar Rapids area. The station is owned by George S. Flinn, Jr., and is programmed by Gorilla Broadcasting Company. KRQN's transmitter is located east of Vinton near Pleasant Creek State Recreation Area.

== History ==
In June 2005, the station signed on the air under the KROJ call letters and airing a classic country format. Since its sign on, Flinn Broadcasting of Memphis has owned the station, but has outsourced programming operations to other owners via local marketing agreements. The station would later flip to oldies under the KRQN call letters, and would shift to classic hits. On September 9, 2011, at 1:07 p.m., after stunting with clips of top 40 music and liners promoting that "the clock is ticking" and to "lock in a preset" and listen at said time, along with bell tolling sounds and people saying "I", KRQN flipped to Top 40/CHR as i107.1, launching with Party Rock Anthem by LMFAO. With this move, KRQN took on the market's more established Top 40/CHR, KZIA, and later, KOSY-FM upon that station's debut in August 2014.

On August 30, 2013, a deal was announced in which Townsquare Media would acquire 53 Cumulus Media stations, including the local marketing agreement for KRQN, for $238 million. The deal was part of Cumulus' acquisition of Dial Global; Townsquare and Dial Global were both controlled by Oaktree Capital Management. The sale to Townsquare was completed on November 14, 2013.

On May 1, 2021, KRQN dropped its top 40/CHR format and flipped to conservative talk, supplied by USA Radio Networks, as a result of its LMA with Townsquare Media ending.

On November 18, 2022, KRQN flipped to Regional Mexican, branded as "El Gallo 107.1". The change came after Gorilla Broadcasting Company (controlled by Steven Lara) began programming the station; Gorilla's other stations (WNMB in North Myrtle Beach, South Carolina, and a local marketing agreement with WLEL in Ellaville, Georgia) also utilize this format and branding.

In March 2026, KRQN changed their format from Regional Mexican to classic hits, branded as "Radio Pig".
