= Tom Churchill =

American radio personality (1961–2020)

Thomas John Churchill (March 4, 1961 – July 5, 2020) was a native of Dubuque, Iowa, where he started in radio as on-air weatherman at WDBQ-AM Radio at the age of 13 in August 1974.

Churchill gained notoriety for reportedly being more accurate than the National Weather Service. As a 14-year-old, he appeared on the Tomorrow Show with Tom Snyder. An appearance on the television game show The $128,000 Question earned Churchill $16,000 in 1976.

== Digital Weatherman ==
In 1979, Churchill formed his first weather forecasting company providing live weather forecasts to radio stations across the United States. In the late 1980s he invented the Digital Weatherman system, an automated system that provides audio weather forecasts. It was first marketed to radio stations in 1986 and is now used by hundreds of radio stations and cable systems across the United States.

This method of providing weather information to listeners allows many broadcasters to provide 24-hour coverage of severe weather events and current conditions without employing full-time staff. Based on a personal computer, the system contains 30,000 small audio cuts of every possible weather condition or bulletin information that can be spoken. The PC reads text forecast information and uses this to merge audio cuts, known as domain specific synthesis, into a complete weather forecast based on the radio station's preferences.

The system's audio library contains different voices and languages. This allows users to instantaneously create forecasts and bulletins in Spanish, for example, directly from English-language text. The first automated Spanish language weather bulletins using this method aired in 1997 on KANS-FM in Emporia, Kansas.

During the 1980s Churchill provided weather forecasting services to a number of Hollywood movie productions filmed in and around the Dubuque area, including George S. Blackwell's Take This Job and Shove It. For his efforts Churchill received kudos from the production team in industry publications such as Variety. This movie as released originally included a scene inserted by the producer after Churchill requested a screen credit for his services. As the lead character, played by actor Robert Hays, showers in his hotel room an English Bulldog leaps into the shower stall with him, brought by his girlfriend, played by Barbara Hershey, on a surprise visit. Hays asks his girlfriend why she is there, and why she brought "what's-his-name" with her. To which Hershey responds "Oh, you never remember Churchill's name." Churchill was married in the late 1980s to Rita Daniels-Churchill, a close relative to Preston Daniels and Robert Wright. They had a son born in 1992, Georan Thomas Churchill.

Tom Churchill is profiled as a biographee in numerous Marquis Who's Who references, from Who's Who in the World and Who's Who in Entertainment to Who's Who in America. He retired to the Dominican Republic in 2001, and in 2016 was sentenced in absentia to 12 months in federal prison for tax evasion for failing to report revenue for Weatheradio and Virtual Voice Technologies.
