= Homer Township, Buchanan County, Iowa =

Township in Iowa, US

Homer Township, Buchanan County
- Township
- Coordinates: 42°20′46″N 091°53′27″W
- Country: United States
- State: Iowa
- County: Buchanan

Area
  - Total: 36.1 sq mi (93.6 km^{2})
  - Land: 36.1 sq mi (93.6 km^{2})
  - Water: 0 sq mi (0 km^{2})
- Elevation: 915 ft (279 m)

Population (2000)
  - Total: 681
  - Density: 19/sq mi (7.3/km^{2})
- FIPS code: 19-91977
- GNIS feature ID: 0468050

Homer Township is one of 16 townships in Buchanan County, Iowa, USA. As of the 2000 census, its population was 681. Homer Township was organized in 1858.

== Geography ==
Homer Township covers an area of 36.14 square miles (93.6 km^{2}) and contains one incorporated settlement, Rowley. According to the USGS, it contains two cemeteries: Clayton and Rowley.
