= WJOD =

Country radio station in Iowa

- Asbury, Iowa; United States
- Broadcast area: Dubuque and Vicinity
- Frequency: 103.3 MHz
- Branding: 103 WJOD

Programming
- Format: Country
- Affiliations: Compass Media Networks; Premiere Networks

Ownership
- Owner: Townsquare Media; (Townsquare License, LLC)
- Sister stations: KLYV, KXGE, WDBQ, WDBQ-FM

History
- First air date: March 31, 1994
- Former call signs: KIKR (1992–1999)

Technical information
- Licensing authority: FCC
- Facility ID: 34596
- Class: C3
- ERP: 6,600 watts
- HAAT: 196 meters (643 ft)
- Transmitter coordinates: 42°24′16″N 90°34′12.5″W

Links
- Public license information: Public file; LMS
- Webcast: Listen live
- Website: 103wjod.com

WJOD (103.3 FM) is a radio station broadcasting a country music format serving the community of Dubuque, Iowa, United States. The station is owned by Townsquare Media and licensed to Townsquare License, LLC.

The station was originally based in Galena, Illinois, and broadcast on a frequency of 107.5. Initially playing adult contemporary, the station later switched to a country music format. The station was later purchased by Cumulus Media and moved to 103.3.

On August 30, 2013, a deal was announced in which Cumulus would swap its stations in Dubuque (including WJOD) and Poughkeepsie, New York, to Townsquare Media in exchange for Peak Broadcasting's stations in Fresno, California. The deal was part of Cumulus' acquisition of Dial Global; Townsquare, Peak, and Dial Global were all controlled by Oaktree Capital Management. The sale to Townsquare was completed on November 14, 2013.
