= KHAK =

Radio station in Cedar Rapids, Iowa

- Cedar Rapids, Iowa; United States
- Broadcast area: Cedar Rapids-Iowa City
- Frequency: 98.1 MHz
- Branding: 98.1 KHAK (pronounced as K-Hawk)

Programming
- Format: Country
- Affiliations: Compass Media Networks; Westwood One

Ownership
- Owner: Townsquare Media; (Townsquare License, LLC)
- Sister stations: KRNA, KDAT

History
- First air date: September 10, 1961
- Call sign meaning: "K-Hawk" (reference to Iowa's nickname as the Hawkeye State, and concurrently University of Iowa athletics)

Technical information
- Licensing authority: FCC
- Facility ID: 54163
- Class: C1
- ERP: 100,000 watts
- HAAT: 140 meters
- Transmitter coordinates: 41°55′28″N 91°36′55″W

Links
- Public license information: Public file; LMS
- Webcast: Listen Live
- Website: khak.com

KHAK (98.1 FM) is a radio station that broadcasts a country music format to the Cedar Rapids–Iowa City, Iowa area. Licensed to Cedar Rapids, the station is currently owned by Townsquare Media. KHAK's studios are located in the Alliant Energy Building on Second Street SE in Cedar Rapids, and its transmitter is located near US 30/US 151 and Ivanhoe Road on the south side of Cedar Rapids.

== History ==
KHAK is one of the top-ranked radio stations in the Cedar Rapids–Iowa City Market. It is based in the Cedar Rapids Market, but it is heard in the Waterloo–Cedar Falls and Quad Cities markets as well in spots. Townsquare Media is the owner of the station, as well as its sister stations KRNA, KRQN, and KDAT.

The Cedar Rapids allocation for 98.1 FM signed on in September 1961, alongside its AM sister station at 1360 AM, both taking on the call letters KHAK. In the early 1960s KHAK's format was MOR, news and talk. Tony Dean, the infamous outdoorsman, was the morning personality and Program Director at KHAK. In the late 1960s both stations changed format to country music and for many years the FM signal duplicated from the AM frequency. University of Iowa athletics were also a mainstay for many years. This setup continued for many years, until some point in the mid-1990s when KHAK (AM) changed its format to contemporary Christian as KTOF, and was a simulcast of KWOF in Hiawatha, Iowa; KHAK FM's country format remains to this day.

On August 30, 2013, a deal was announced in which Townsquare Media would acquire 53 Cumulus Media stations, including KHAK, for $238 million. The deal is part of Cumulus' acquisition of Dial Global; Townsquare and Dial Global are both controlled by Oaktree Capital Management. The sale to Townsquare was completed on November 14, 2013.
