= Dottie Ray =

American journalist and radio host

- Born: September 20, 1922; Eagle Grove, Iowa, U.S.
- Died: August 9, 2016 (aged 93)
- Occupations: journalist and radio host
- Known for: Dottie Ray Show (1959–2014)

Dottie Ray (September 20, 1922 – August 9, 2016) was an American journalist and radio host. While a student at the University of Iowa she joined the student newspaper, the Daily Iowan, and became its first female editor-in-chief. Ray led an all-female editorial team during World War II and employed her future husband, Robert Ray, to write editorials. She moved with Robert to Albany, New York, but returned to Iowa after three years. Ray was asked to become a host for Iowa radio station KXIC around 1959 and accepted when the station offered to set up a studio in her house so she could manage her childcare. She initially presented a show as "President Alice" interviewing children on their birthdays. Ray was offered a 15-minute show interviewing local personalities which ran weekly from September 4, 1959, as the Dottie Ray Show. The show survived cancellation in 1980 and ran until 2014, by which time she had broadcast 14,444 shows and interviewed 32,397 people. Ray was entered into the Iowa Broadcasters Association Hall of Fame in 2008 and received the national Marconi Small Market Personality of the Year award in 2014. She was featured in a documentary in June 2016.

== University of Iowa ==
Dottie Ray was born in Eagle Grove and attended the University of Iowa. Ray became the fifth editor-in-chief of the university's student newspaper, the Daily Iowan, in 1942; she was the first woman to hold the role. During World War II, she led an all-female editorial staff, most of the men being away fighting. Her tenure included coverage of D-Day (1944) and the start of Dwight D. Eisenhower's administration (1953). Ray employed the newspaper's first female sports editor and had to fight to get her admittance into the Iowa Hawkeyes press box to cover sports events. Ray met her husband, Robert Ray, at the newspaper when he came to her office to complain about the quality of the editorials being run; Dottie offered Robert a job writing editorials. During this period, Ray also acted as an announcer on the university radio station WSUI. She earned bachelor's and master's degrees and remained at the university for a period as a teacher of journalism. She then worked for a Cedar Rapids advertising agency and for the Iowa Development Commission.

== KXIC ==
The dog barks, and the clock bongs. The kids grew up with the show. They just took it for granted.

— Dottie Ray

Ray and her husband lived for three years in Albany, New York, before returning to Iowa where she remained for the rest of her life. Ray was afterwards offered a morning slot on Iowa City radio station KXIC. She refused, citing childcare constraints, but the station persisted and offered to set up a studio in her home. She presented a 15-minute interview segment, with guests sitting on her living room with a cup of coffee. On occasion, guests failed to show, and Ray ad-libbed with personal recollections. She stated that these were the shows that received the most response from members of the public. Broadcasting from home came with its own pitfalls; once, Dottie's daughter Amy unplugged the microphone and stopped the show, and on another occasion, a repairman who had been ringing the doorbell to no response entered to find out that he was on the air.

She joined KXIC around 1959 and broadcast a show as "President Alice". In this role she interviewed children on their birthdays and gave them cupcakes. She later said "If I'd had my druthers, I would have only interviewed children all my life". The first episode of the Dottie Ray Show was broadcast on September 4, 1959. On this 15-minute programme she interviewed local personalities, with a focus on arts and culture. Ray was one of the first women to host their own radio talk show. Ray was responsible for booking her own guests. When KXIC was sold in 1980, the new owners canceled Ray's show; it was saved after advertisers threatened en masse to cancel their contracts and was returned to the air within the week. After long airing at 11:45 am, the show moved to 8:45 am in 2003.

Ray's husband, who became director of the University of Iowa's Institute of Public Affairs, died in 1982. Ray was entered into the Iowa Broadcasters Association Hall of Fame in 2008 and received the national Marconi Small Market Personality of the Year award in 2014. The final episode of the Dottie Ray Show was broadcast from Ray's home on May 13, 2014. She broadcast 14,444 shows in which she interviewed 32,397 people. Her final show was an hour long and Ray was interviewed by KXIC's morning show host Jay Capron. In June 2016 the Coralville Center for the Performing Arts screened a documentary about Ray, Staying Tuned: The Dottie Ray Story. Ray's death, at the age of 93, was announced by KXIC on August 9, 2016.
