= KPTY (AM) =

Radio station in Waterloo, Iowa

Coordinates: 42°28′1″N 92°15′59.7″W

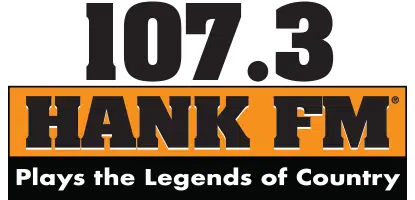
- Waterloo, Iowa; United States
- Broadcast area: Waterloo–Cedar Falls metropolitan area and Vicinity
- Frequency: 1330 kHz
- Branding: 107.3 Hank FM

Programming
- Format: Classic country
- Affiliations: University of Northern Iowa Sports Network

Ownership
- Owner: NRG Media (sale to Cedar Basin Media) pending); (NRG License Sub, LLC)
- Sister stations: KFMW; KOKZ; KXEL

History
- First air date: November 4, 1947
- Former call signs: KWWL (1947–1981); KWLO (1981–2015)
- Call sign meaning: "Party" (previous format)

Technical information
- Licensing authority: FCC
- Facility ID: 51662
- Class: B
- Power: 5,000 watts
- Translator: 107.3 K297BS (Waterloo)

Links
- Public license information: Public file; LMS
- Webcast: Listen live
- Website: www.1073hankfm.com

KPTY (1330 kHz, "107.3 Hank FM") is an AM radio station serving the Waterloo–Cedar Falls metropolitan area with a classic country format. It is under ownership of NRG Media.

== History ==
On June 12, 1947, the Federal Communications Commission granted a construction permit to Black Hawk Broadcasting Company for a radio station in Waterloo, Iowa. Less than five months later, Black Hawk president R.J. McElroy made the launch of KWWL a reality. The station began broadcasting on 1320 kHz, operating with 1,000 watts of power in studio space once occupied by WMT in the Hotel Russell-Lamson. The frequency changed to 1330 a short time later, operating with 5,000 watts. McElroy formed KWWL-TV in 1953, and KWWL-FM (now KFMW) in 1968.

KWWL was a very popular top 40 station until the format moved to KFMW in 1982. On February 16, 1981, KWWL became KWLO with the sale of the Black Hawk Broadcasting Company to Forward Communications. KWLO's format moved to adult contemporary and evolved into full service. In the summer of 1993, KWLO switched music formats from lite AC to oldies, adopting "Oldies 1330" as a moniker. The new format maintained existing full service news and talk programming as well as local features like "Buy, Sell, & Trade", a Tradio program.

After KWLO and KFMW were purchased by Bahakel Communications in 1996, the adult standards format that was on KXEL moved to KWLO in March 1997. For a time, it was syndicating a combined oldies/adult standards format courtesy of Citadel Media's "Timeless" satellite feed. With that network's demise on February 13, 2010, KWLO slightly tweaked their format and switched over to Dial Global's Kool Gold oldies network. On July 1, 2012, KWLO's format changed to sports radio.

The station was purchased by Woodward Communications, Inc., in April 2012 along with Bahakel's other Waterloo radio stations. Woodward Communications sold KWLO and three sister stations to NRG Radio's NRG License Sub, LLC effective December 1, 2014, at a price of $3.55 million.

On June 28, 2015, at midnight, KWLO flipped back to top 40/CHR, branded as "107.3 The Party" (simulcast on translator K297BS 107.3 FM Waterloo). On July 9, 2015, KWLO changed its call sign to KPTY to go with the "Party" branding.

On January 31, 2020, after playing “Him & I” by G-Eazy and Halsey, KPTY flipped to classic country, branded as "107.3 Hank FM". The first song on “Hank FM” was “Live Until I Die” by Clay Walker.

In September 2026, it was announced that NRG Radio would sell all four stations in the Waterloo–Cedar Rapids cluster to Civic Media's subsidiary Cedar Basin Media for an undisclosed amount.
