= KRNA =

- Iowa City, Iowa; United States
- Broadcast area: Cedar Rapids, Iowa
- Frequency: 94.1 MHz
- Branding: 94.1 KRNA

Programming
- Format: Classic rock
- Affiliations: Compass Media Networks

Ownership
- Owner: Townsquare Media; (Townsquare License, LLC)
- Sister stations: KDAT, KHAK

History
- First air date: October 4, 1974 (at 93.5)
- Former frequencies: 93.5 MHz (1974–1979); 93.9 MHz (1979–1991)

Technical information
- Licensing authority: FCC
- Facility ID: 35555
- Class: C1
- ERP: 100,000 watts
- HAAT: 299 meters (981 ft)
- Transmitter coordinates: 41°45′0″N 91°50′16″W

Links
- Public license information: Public file; LMS
- Webcast: Listen Live
- Website: krna.com

KRNA (94.1 FM) is a classic rock-formatted radio station licensed to Iowa City, Iowa. The station is currently owned by Townsquare Media. KRNA's studios located in the Alliant Energy Building in Downtown Cedar Rapids, and their transmitter is located west of Oxford.

== History ==
In 1971, a group of University of Iowa students formed a company known as Communicators Inc. of Iowa that aimed "to put together a radio station with a major market sound in what was basically a small-to-medium market." At the time, FM radio stations in Iowa were primarily used for beautiful music formats or repeater signals for co-owned AM stations while popular music was played on AM stations. By 1974, Communicators Inc. of Iowa had been renamed KRNA, Inc., and the company was granted FCC approval to begin broadcasting. KRNA began broadcasting at 93.5 FM on October 4, 1974. (KRNA later moved to 93.9 FM in 1979 before moving to its present 94.1 FM at 9 a.m. on October 14, 1991.) By January 1975, Arbitron telephone surveys showed that nearly half of local radio listeners were tuned into KRNA. As part of its "major market sound", KRNA pre-recorded its commercial announcements during a time when most commercials were read live on the air, and it also broadcast 24 hours a day while other radio stations signed off during the overnight hours for equipment maintenance.

When the early 1980s rolled along, KRNA began tweaking its Top 40 format by leaning towards rock. In June 1985, the station dropped its rock-leaned Top 40 format for album rock. In 1994, KRNA purchased KQCR (102.9 FM) in Cedar Rapids, the area's longtime dominant CHR station, to create the area's first radio duopoly. After reformatting KQCR as country music station KXMX, owners Rob Norton and Eliot Keller agreed to sell KRNA and KXMX to Capstar Broadcasting in 1998. While the KRNA sale was successful, Capstar terminated the agreement to buy KXMX. (Norton and Keller kept KXMX, renaming it KZIA and changing the station's format to contemporary hits.) AMFM, Inc., acquired Capstar in 1999, and Clear Channel Communications acquired AMFM in 2000; however, KRNA was sold to Cumulus Media that year since Clear Channel already owned a group of stations in eastern Iowa.

In 2004, KRNA's format shifted from classic rock to active rock, adopting the nickname "Real Rock 94.1". That year, former KFMW morning DJs Lou Waters and Scott Steele became the station's morning-drive disc jockeys. Lou and Scott were replaced by Davenport-based DJs Greg Dwyer and Bill Michaels in January 2007. Dwyer and Michaels joined KRNA as the result of a non-compete clause that prevented them from working at any station in the Quad Cities market for six months after their contract with Clear Channel Communications expired at the end of 2006. Dwyer and Michaels, who had previously worked with WXLP and KCQQ radio in the Quad Cities, rejoined Cumulus-owned WXLP on July 13, 2007, but continued to simulcast their show on KRNA until late 2008. Clear Channel sued Dwyer and Michaels in February 2007, claiming that KRNA was audible in the Quad Cities area and the duo was actively promoting the show in the Quad Cities. On March 1, 2007, a Scott County judge ruled that Dwyer and Michaels did not violate the clause since Arbitron did not consider the Quad Cities part of KRNA's market area. Dwyer and Michaels would return to KRNA in October 2020.

For many years, KRNA was known for distributing free posters of the Iowa Hawkeyes men's basketball team at live remote broadcasts. This tradition began in the late 1970s, and while the posters are now sold by the University of Iowa athletic department, they continue to be printed under the sponsorship of KZIA.

On August 30, 2013, a deal was announced in which Townsquare Media would acquire 53 Cumulus stations, including KRNA, for $238 million. The deal was part of Cumulus' acquisition of Dial Global; Townsquare and Dial Global are both controlled by Oaktree Capital Management. The sale to Townsquare was completed on November 14, 2013.

On September 5, 2014, KRNA adjusted its playlist to include more songs from the alternative rock genre.

At 5 p.m. on August 12, 2016, KRNA shifted back to classic rock.
