= KXGE =

- Dubuque, Iowa; United States
- Broadcast area: Dubuque and vicinity
- Frequency: 102.3 MHz
- Branding: Eagle 102.3

Programming
- Format: Classic rock
- Affiliations: Compass Media Networks; United Stations Radio Networks

Ownership
- Owner: Townsquare Media; (Townsquare License, LLC)
- Sister stations: KLYV, WDBQ, WDBQ-FM, WJOD

History
- First air date: 1980 (as KLXL)
- Former call signs: KLXL (1978–1985); KIYX (1985–1986); KQKX (1986); KXKX (1986–1989); KDFX (1989–1992); KGGY (1992–1997)

Technical information
- Licensing authority: FCC
- Facility ID: 29127
- Class: A
- ERP: 2,000 watts
- HAAT: 94 meters (308 ft)
- Transmitter coordinates: 42°35′7″N 90°38′50.5″W

Links
- Public license information: Public file; LMS
- Webcast: Listen live
- Website: eagle1023fm.com

KXGE (102.3 FM) is a radio station broadcasting a classic rock format serving the Dubuque, Iowa, United States, community. The station is owned by Townsquare Media and licensed to Townsquare License, LLC. The station at one time broadcast a country music format as KXKX ("Kix 102"). The station also broadcasts every home and away game for the Dubuque Fighting Saints of the United States Hockey League (USHL).

On August 30, 2013, a deal was announced in which Cumulus Media would swap its stations in Dubuque (including KXGE) and Poughkeepsie, New York, to Townsquare Media in exchange for Peak Broadcasting's stations in Fresno, California. The deal was part of Cumulus' acquisition of Dial Global; Townsquare, Peak, and Dial Global were all controlled by Oaktree Capital Management. The sale to Townsquare was completed on November 14, 2013. As of March 2022, Dwyer & Michaels is the syndicated morning show on the station, with local personality Tom Drake hosting the weekday afternoon show.
