= KOKZ =

Radio station in Waterloo, Iowa

Coordinates: 42.410°N 92.086°W

- Waterloo, Iowa; United States
- Broadcast area: Waterloo–Cedar Rapids
- Frequency: 105.7 MHz
- Branding: 105.7 KOKZ

Programming
- Format: Classic hits
- Affiliations: Premiere Networks; United Stations Radio Networks

Ownership
- Owner: NRG Media (sale to Cedar Basin Media pending); (NRG License Sub, LLC)
- Sister stations: KFMW; KPTY; KXEL

History
- First air date: November 21, 1962
- Former call signs: KXEL-FM (1962–1979); KCNB (1979–1985)

Technical information
- Licensing authority: FCC
- Facility ID: 35949
- Class: C0
- ERP: 100,000 watts
- HAAT: 403 m (1,322 ft)

Links
- Public license information: Public file; LMS
- Webcast: Listen live
- Website: www.1057kokz.com

KOKZ (105.7 FM) is a radio station licensed to Waterloo, Iowa, United States, serving the Waterloo and Cedar Rapids metropolitan areas with a classic hits format which includes a diverse playlist of music from the late 1960s to the early 1990s. It is under ownership of Cedar Rapids-based NRG Media and has its studios in nearby Hiawatha.

== History ==
The station signed on in 1962 as KXEL-FM, and in 1979, was given the callsign KCNB. The station has been known as KOKZ since 1985.

The station originally broadcast a Top 40/CHR format as "Hits 106" and "OK 105.7", and then programmed an adult contemporary format for several years in the 1990s. It switched to oldies, and rebranded as "Cool 105.7", at 6 a.m. on February 3, 1997, and adopted the current classic hits format in 2006. The “Cool” branding would later be dropped in favor of branding by their call letters.

Syndicated weekend programs currently airing on KOKZ include classic "American Top 40" rebroadcasts from the 1970s and 1980s, "Absolutely '80s" hosted by former MTV VJ Nina Blackwood, and "Retro Pop Reunion" with Joe Cortese.
