= KDAT =

- Cedar Rapids, Iowa; United States
- Broadcast area: Cedar Rapids-Iowa City
- Frequency: 104.5 MHz
- Branding: 104.5 KDAT

Programming
- Format: Adult contemporary
- Affiliations: Compass Media Networks; Westwood One

Ownership
- Owner: Townsquare Media; (Townsquare License, LLC)
- Sister stations: KHAK, KRNA

History
- First air date: May 18, 1971
- Former call signs: KTOF (1971–1995)

Technical information
- Licensing authority: FCC
- Facility ID: 54165
- Class: C1
- ERP: 100,000 watts
- HAAT: 168 meters (551 ft)
- Transmitter coordinates: 42°4′51″N 91°41′45″W

Links
- Public license information: Public file; LMS
- Webcast: Listen Live
- Website: kdat.com

KDAT (104.5 FM) is a radio station broadcasting an adult contemporary music format. Licensed to Cedar Rapids, Iowa, the station serves the Cedar Rapids-Iowa City area. The station is currently owned by Townsquare Media. KDAT's studios are located in the Alliant Energy Building on Second Street SE in Cedar Rapids, and its transmitter is located in Robins.

Formerly a Christian music station, KTOF flipped to its current format and KDAT call letters on March 6, 1995.

On August 30, 2013, a deal was announced in which Townsquare would acquire 53 Cumulus stations, including KDAT, for $238 million. The deal is part of Cumulus' acquisition of Dial Global; Townsquare and Dial Global are both controlled by Oaktree Capital Management. The sale to Townsquare was completed on November 14, 2013.
