= KKRQ =

Coordinates: 41.757°N 91.525°W

- Iowa City, Iowa; United States
- Broadcast area: Iowa City-Cedar Rapids
- Frequency: 100.7 MHz
- Branding: 100.7 The Fox

Programming
- Format: Classic rock
- Affiliations: Westwood One

Ownership
- Owner: iHeartMedia; (iHM Licenses, LLC)
- Sister stations: KOSY-FM, KKSY-FM, KMJM, KXIC, WMT

History
- First air date: 1966 (as KXIC-FM)
- Former call signs: KXIC-FM (1966–1975); KICG (1975–1980)

Technical information
- Licensing authority: FCC
- Facility ID: 29076
- Class: C1
- ERP: 100,000 watts
- HAAT: 162 meters (531 ft)

Links
- Public license information: Public file; LMS
- Webcast: Listen Live
- Website: kkrq.iheart.com

KKRQ (100.7 FM) is a classic rock station in the Cedar Rapids and Iowa City areas. Known as "100.7 The Fox", the station is operated by iHeartMedia and licensed to Iowa City, Iowa.

Music on "100.7 The Fox" includes hits from the 1960s through the 1990s, and uses the slogan "The Corridor's Classic Rock".

KKRQ broadcasts with a power of 100,000 watts, with transmitter and tower located outside on the north side of Iowa City. Its studios had been co-located with sister station KXIC (800 AM) in that same facility, but KKRQ has since moved to iHeartMedia's offices at Broadcast Park in northeast Cedar Rapids.

== History ==
The station signed on as KXIC-FM in 1966, and is the FM sister station to KXIC.

The station, now known as KKRQ, would flip to oldies on September 18, 1989. The format would later evolve to classic hits.

At some point after 2010, KKRQ switched to a classic hits format with elements of classic rock (similar to WROR, Boston and WJJK, Indianapolis), playing a variety of music from the 1960s through to the 2000s. At night the station switched purely to classic rock with Sixx Sense with Nikki Sixx. In 2021, KKRQ dropped the classic hits portion of their playlist and segued into a full time classic rock format emphasizing the "Classic Rock" slogan.

Since 1997, KKRQ has carried The Bob & Tom Show from sister station WFBQ in Indianapolis.

Logo under previous slogan

On March 31, 2023 an EF-2 Tornado knocked down the station's radio tower forcing the station off the air. The station plans on rebuilding their tower and using a temporary transmitter to broadcast in the meantime.
