= KGYM =

- Cedar Rapids, Iowa; United States
- Broadcast area: Cedar Rapids, Iowa
- Frequency: 1600 kHz
- Branding: 1600 ESPN

Programming
- Format: Sports
- Affiliations: ESPN Radio

Ownership
- Owner: KZIA, Inc.
- Sister stations: KZIA

History
- First air date: December 20, 1947
- Former call signs: KCRG (1947–1953, 1954-2006); KCRI (1953–1954)
- Call sign meaning: Sports are commonly played in a gym

Technical information
- Licensing authority: FCC
- Facility ID: 9718
- Class: B
- Power: 5,000 watts
- Transmitter coordinates: 41°58′15″N 91°32′01″W
- Translator: See § Translators
- Repeater: 102.9 KZIA-HD3 (Cedar Rapids)

Links
- Public license information: Public file; LMS
- Webcast: Listen live
- Website: kgymradio.com

KGYM (1600 AM) is a radio station broadcasting in Cedar Rapids, Iowa. The station is owned by KZIA, Inc., which also owns KZIA (102.9 FM). It is Cedar Rapids' second-oldest radio station, after WMT.

KGYM does not broadcast a digital HD signal on its AM frequency of 1600 kHz, but it can be heard in HD on KZIA-HD3.

== History ==
KGYM signed on as KCRG on December 20, 1947, under the ownership of the Cedar Rapids Gazette Company (later known as Gazette Communications). The Gazette Company had launched Cedar Rapids' first FM station, KCRK-FM 96.1, a month earlier, and had applied for a construction permit for a television station on channel 9 that year. (KCRK-FM signed off in 1954, as FM radio was still in its infancy and the station proved to be unprofitable.) In 1953, the Gazette Company consolidated its interests with the Cedar Rapids Television Company, another group interested in the channel 9 license, and in October 1953, the call letters of the radio and television stations were changed to KCRI. After the Gazette Company bought out the Cedar Rapids Television Company's stock on August 27, 1954, the KCRG call letters were restored to both the AM and TV stations.

KCRG was formerly an adult contemporary station until August 31, 1984, when it switched to a big band/adult standards format, branded as "Stardust 16". The station returned back to adult contemporary in January 1987, but flipped to oldies two years later in 1989. On April 2, 1990, KCRG flipped to country music as "16 Country" KCRG adopted a news radio format on September 26, 1994, and would later evolve into a news/talk format. By 2000, the station had moved to its current sports talk format, but continued to simulcast KCRG-TV's newscasts and ABC's World News Tonight for radio listeners. KCRG adopted the nickname "The Zone" in 2003.

On July 10, 2006, Gazette Communications announced that KCRG was being sold to owners of another local broadcaster, KZIA, subject to FCC approval. The sale was finalized on October 31, 2006, and the call letters were changed to KGYM as a result of the sale. After the acquisition, KGYM ended its simulcasting of KCRG-TV's newscasts, and KGYM's studios moved from downtown Cedar Rapids to KZIA's studios on the city's southwest side.

Logo as The Gym

== Programming ==
KGYM currently broadcasts ESPN Radio programming along with Iowa State University sports, college basketball and the NFL from Westwood One, the IndyCar Series, Minnesota Twins baseball on 107.5 FM and area high school football and basketball games. It also carried Cedar Rapids Kernels games before sharing rights with KMRY, another Cedar Rapids radio station, during the 2006 season. Kernels games moved exclusively to KMRY starting in 2007.

Local talk shows include The Gym Class hosted by KGYM sports director Scott Unash and former Cedar Rapids Gazette sports editor Mark Dukes, and The Todd Brommelkamp Show hosted by Voice of the Hawkeyes magazine editor Todd Brommelkamp. "Spencer on Sports" was added in early 2022, hosted by Spencer Wagen.

== Translators ==
Call sign	Frequency (MHz)	City of license	Facility ID	Rebroadcasts
K272GB	102.3	Cedar Rapids, Iowa	202139	KGYM
K292FZ	106.3	Iowa City, Iowa	153604	KZIA-HD3
