= WDBQ-FM =

Radio station in Galena, Illinois, US

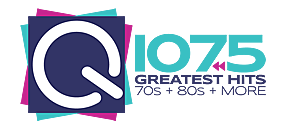
- Galena, Illinois; United States
- Broadcast area: Dubuque, Iowa and Vicinity
- Frequency: 107.5 MHz
- Branding: Q107.5

Programming
- Format: Classic hits
- Affiliations: Compass Media Networks; Premiere Networks; Westwood One

Ownership
- Owner: Townsquare Media; (Townsquare License, LLC)
- Sister stations: KLYV, KXGE, WDBQ, WJOD

History
- First air date: 1989 (as WJOD)
- Former call signs: WJOD (1988–1999)
- Call sign meaning: Dubuque

Technical information
- Licensing authority: FCC
- Facility ID: 30617
- Class: A
- ERP: 6,000 watts
- HAAT: 100 meters (330 ft)
- Transmitter coordinates: 42°24′2.00″N 90°23′55.00″W

Links
- Public license information: Public file; LMS
- Webcast: Listen Live
- Website: myq1075.com

WDBQ-FM (107.5 MHz) is a radio station broadcasting a classic hits format. Located near Galena, Illinois, United States, the station serves the Dubuque, Iowa area. The station is owned by Townsquare Media and licensed to Townsquare License, LLC.

== History ==
The station went was assigned the call sign WJOD on May 6, 1988; it signed on in 1989. As WJOD the station broadcast a country music format, which is now located at 103.3 MHz. On February 8, 1999, the station changed its call sign to WDBQ-FM.

WDBQ-FM changed formats from oldies (1960s and 1970s) to the more modern classic hits format, which focuses more on music from the 1970s and 1980s, on November 14, 2008. The "Oldies 107.5" moniker was also replaced, WDBQ-FM now goes as "Q107.5".

On August 30, 2013, a deal was announced in which Cumulus Media would swap its stations in Dubuque (including WDBQ-FM) and Poughkeepsie, New York, to Townsquare Media in exchange for Peak Broadcasting's stations in Fresno, California. The deal was part of Cumulus' acquisition of Dial Global; Townsquare, Peak, and Dial Global are all controlled by Oaktree Capital Management. The sale to Townsquare was completed on November 14, 2013.
