= Ron Steele (news anchor) =

News anchor and university professor

Ronald Lee Steele is an American retired local news anchor at KWWL in Waterloo, Iowa. He spent 51 years with KWWL, the NBC affiliate for the Cedar Rapids–Waterloo–Iowa City–Dubuque television market.

Starting as the sports director for KWWL, Steele did play-by-play for NBC Sports and ESPN. He was the original play-by-play voice of the Iowa Television Network, which broadcast University of Iowa basketball games over a statewide network. He also was in Saudi Arabia during the Persian Gulf War, and at the White House when the hostages came home from Iran and he interviewed President George H. W. Bush on Air Force One.

He also taught media at the University of Northern Iowa for 10 years from 2004 to 2014.

In April 2024, Steele celebrated 50 years at the station. Week-long highlights of his half-century career were shown along with a 30-minute special. Steele announced that he is leaving KWWL, with February 27, 2025, being his last day. Steele's lengthy career was recognized by Senator Chuck Grassley in remarks on the U.S. Senate floor on February 26, 2025.
