= KMJM (AM) =

Radio station in Cedar Rapids, Iowa

- Cedar Rapids, Iowa; United States
- Frequency: 1360 kHz
- Branding: Leo 1360

Programming
- Format: Oldies

Ownership
- Owner: iHeartMedia, Inc.; (iHM Licenses, LLC)
- Sister stations: KKRQ, KKSY-FM, KOSY-FM, KXIC, WMT

History
- First air date: September 10, 1961
- Former call signs: KHAK (1961–1995); KTOF (1995–2001)

Technical information
- Licensing authority: FCC
- Facility ID: 54164
- Class: D
- Power: 1,000 watts (day); 124 watts (night)
- Transmitter coordinates: 41°55′28″N 91°36′55″W
- Translator: 101.5 K268CY (Cedar Rapids)

Links
- Public license information: Public file; LMS
- Webcast: Listen Live
- Website: 1360kmjm.iheart.com

KMJM (1360 AM) is a radio station licensed to serve Cedar Rapids, Iowa. The station is owned by iHeartMedia, Inc. and licensed to iHM Licenses, LLC. It airs an oldies music format including Cedar Rapids Roughriders hockey, Coe College football, and serves as an overflow station for University of Iowa men's and women's basketball when games conflict with another Hawkeye event airing on sister station WMT.

== History ==
The Cedar Rapids allocation for 1360 AM signed on in September 1961, alongside its FM sister station at 98.1 FM, both taking on the call letters KHAK. Both stations formatted country music—although not exclusively until sometime later in the 1960s—and for many years, the AM signal was duplicated on the FM frequency.

On March 6, 1995, KHAK changed its format to contemporary Christian as KTOF, and was a simulcast of KWOF in Hiawatha. On December 19, 2001, the station switched call signs to the current KMJM and began airing a nostalgia format of "American music classics" from the 1930s and 1940s. KMJM would later flip to sports talk as "1360 The Fan".

On January 11, 2010, KMJM changed its format to classic country.

On October 10, 2017, KMJM flipped to adult standards, branded as "Leo 1360". The station had been airing one adult standards-nostalgia based program in the past, "Jim Doyne's Musical Memories", airing at noon Sundays, prior to the format switch.

Every year during the first week of November, KMJM drops its regular format and plays Christmas music.

On May 4, 2020, at midnight, KMJM changed their format to oldies, while retaining the "Leo 1360" moniker.
