= KGAN =

Television station in Cedar Rapids, Iowa

- Cedar Rapids–Waterloo–; Iowa City–Dubuque, Iowa; United States
- City: Cedar Rapids, Iowa
- Channels: Digital: 29 (UHF); Virtual: 2
- Branding: CBS 2; Iowa's News Now; Fox 28 (2.2)

Programming
- Affiliations: 2.1: CBS; 2.2: Fox; 2.3: Quest

Ownership
- Owner: Sinclair Broadcast Group; (KGAN Licensee, LLC)
- Sister stations: KFXA

History
- First air date: September 30, 1953
- Former call signs: WMT-TV (1953–1981); KGAN-TV (1981–1984)
- Former channel numbers: Analog: 2 (VHF, 1953–2009); Digital: 51 (UHF, 2002–2014)
- Former affiliations: DuMont (1953–1956)
- Call sign meaning: Guy Gannett Communications, former owner

Technical information
- Licensing authority: FCC
- Facility ID: 25685
- ERP: 850 kW
- HAAT: 585 m (1,919 ft)
- Transmitter coordinates: 42°18′59″N 91°51′31″W

Links
- Public license information: Public file; LMS
- Website: cbs2iowa.com

KGAN (channel 2) is a television station licensed to Cedar Rapids, Iowa, United States, serving Eastern Iowa as an affiliate of CBS and Fox. It is owned by Sinclair Broadcast Group alongside KFXA (channel 28). The two stations share studios at Broadcast Park on Old Marion Road Northeast (along IA 100) in Cedar Rapids; KGAN's transmitter is located in Rowley.

Channel 2 was the first television station in Eastern Iowa, signing on as WMT-TV on September 30, 1953. It was originally the radio adjunct to Cedar Rapids radio station WMT. A CBS affiliate from its first day on air, channel 2 was the market's leading station for most of its early history. Its original ownership, American Broadcasting Stations, sold WMT radio and television to Orion Broadcasting in 1981; when Orion merged with Cosmos Broadcasting, channel 2 was split from WMT and renamed KGAN by its new owner, Guy Gannett. After being second in news ratings in the 1980s, KGAN sank to third by the early 1990s, a position it continues to hold in the market. Sinclair acquired KGAN as part of its 1999 purchase of Guy Gannett. The Fox programming previously on KFXA relocated to a subchannel of KGAN on January 1, 2021.

== History ==
=== Construction and early years ===
American Broadcasting Stations, Inc., the owner of Cedar Rapids radio station WMT (600 AM), applied to the Federal Communications Commission (FCC) on January 10, 1951, for permission to build a new television station on channel 9. In June 1952, after the FCC lifted its four-year freeze on television station grants and changed many channel allocations nationally, the application was amended to specify channel 2. In addition to the WMT application, the Davenport Broadcasting Company, owner of KSTT in Davenport, sought channel 2. American Broadcasting Stations charged that Davenport Broadcasting was not financially qualified to build the station.

On April 8, 1953, after Davenport withdrew from contention, the FCC approved American Broadcasting Stations's application and granted a construction permit. WMT-TV began regular broadcasting on September 30, 1953, as the first station in Eastern Iowa. After brief remarks by general manager and part-owner William B. Quarton, the station aired Game 1 of the 1953 World Series. The Series was carried by special arrangement with NBC, but WMT-TV was a primary affiliate of CBS with selected programs of the DuMont Television Network. When the station started, the studios on Old Marion Road were still being built and were expected to be completed in November; as a result, live local programming did not appear immediately. As a promotional tactic, the new TV station paid its employees in unusual two-dollar bills. It boasted that it was the first station to broadcast with an effective radiated power of 100,000 watts (the maximum for channels 2 through 6).

WMT-TV began construction of a new, taller tower near Walker in June 1956. The structure, intended to be 1,358 feet (414 m) tall, was toppled in a windstorm on December 10, having reached 1,250 feet (380 m) in height. The structure was rebuilt and put into use in July 1957. In April 1967, the station converted to color for local programming.

In December 1967, American Broadcasting Stations announced it was negotiating to sell WMT radio and television to WAVE, Inc. of Louisville, Kentucky; the $9.98 million purchase was approved by the FCC in June 1968. In 1969, WAVE, Inc. renamed itself Orion Broadcasting in reflection of its broadcasting holdings beyond Louisville.

=== Guy Gannett ownership ===
Orion Broadcasting announced in April 1980 that it would put all of its stations up for sale. The Morton and Norton families opted to sell the entire company to avoid paying inheritance taxes when 71-year-old Mrs. George Norton eventually died, taxes they were not sure the company could pay. Two months later, Orion announced it would merge with Cosmos Broadcasting, a subsidiary of insurance and broadcasting conglomerate Liberty Corporation. However, the two companies together owned eight very high frequency (VHF) television stations, three more than the FCC allowed at the time. As a condition of the merger, Cosmos opted to sell WMT-TV as well as WFRV-TV in Green Bay, Wisconsin, and WJMN-TV in Escanaba, Michigan.

Guy Gannett Broadcasting Services of Portland, Maine, agreed to acquire WMT-TV in February 1981, becoming the company's third television station and first in the Midwest. As Cosmos retained WMT radio and the radio stations would retain the WMT call letters, a new designation was required for channel 2. Guy Gannett selected KGAN, which mirrored the company's WGAN-TV in Portland. The $13 million sale received FCC approval that August and was completed on October 16, 1981, at which time WMT-TV became KGAN-TV.

=== Sinclair ownership ===
Motivated by the impending expiration of the family trust that owned the company, Guy Gannett Communications put itself up for sale in 1998. The Seattle Times Company acquired Guy Gannett's newspapers, while the firm's television stations were purchased by Baltimore-based Sinclair Broadcast Group. The Guy Gannett purchase gave Sinclair diversification into affiliates of the Big Three networks and beyond a portfolio heavy with Fox, WB, and UPN stations.

Sinclair attempted later that year to sell KGAN and two ex-Guy Gannett stations in Illinois—WICS in Springfield and WICD in Champaign—to Sunrise Television. At the time, Sinclair was attempting to shed some of the smaller-market stations it had acquired in a string of recent purchases, as the company had made losses following the purchases. The deal never received approval from the FCC or the United States Department of Justice because of the ownership structure of Sunrise, which was affiliated with investment firm Hicks, Muse, Tate & Furst. That firm was also majority stockholder of the LIN TV Corporation. At the time, LIN owned WAND in Decatur, a rival to WICS/WICD, and could not own both stations.

In 2002, Sinclair and Second Generation of Iowa, owner of KFXA, entered into an outsourcing agreement whereby Sinclair began providing KFXA's sales and other non-programming services. Sinclair then acquired the assets of KFXA, except the license, in 2008. On January 1, 2021, the programming and Fox affiliation of KFXA's main subchannel became the 2.2 subchannel of KGAN.

KGAN began broadcasting a digital signal on channel 51 on October 26, 2002. The station has been digital-only since February 17, 2009; however, the station later asked to move down from its original channel of 51. At the time, the FCC permitted moves of stations off this channel pursuant to agreements with licensees of wireless and cellular services occupying the spectrum formerly allocated to channels 52-69, immediately adjacent. On the morning of April 5, 2014, the station moved to channel 29.

== News operation ==
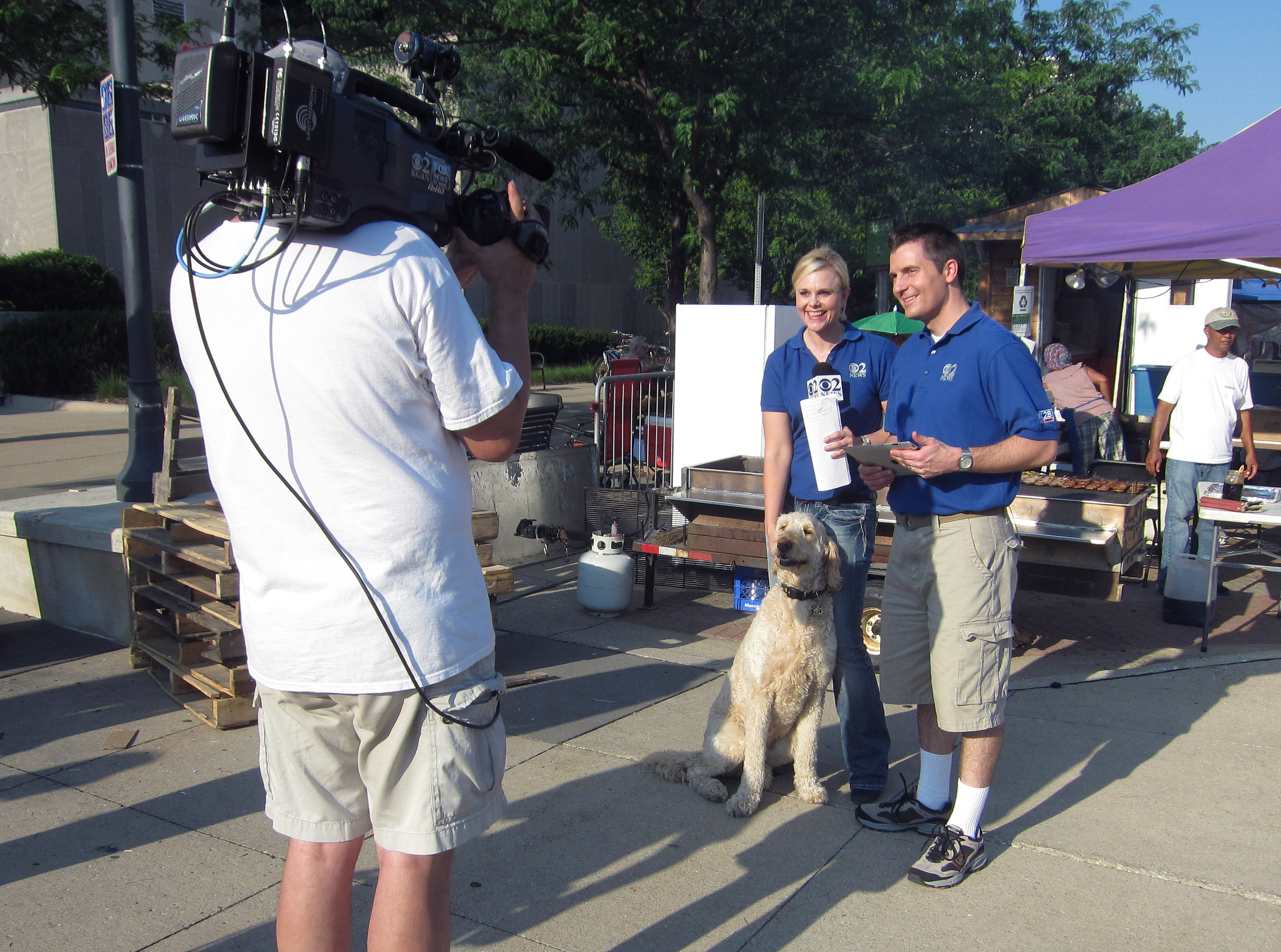
Filming of a KGAN segment at Iowa City Jazz Fest in 2013

The station established a local news department in early 1954 and immediately launched a weeknight 6 p.m. newscast. That fall, a 10 p.m. local newscast was added, followed by a noon news program in 1956. WMT-TV was the dominant television news source in Eastern Iowa in its early years. A February 1965 Arbitron survey found that 71,000 households—approximately 68 percent of the audience—watched WMT's late news, whereas competitors KWWL and KCRG-TV between them only attracted 33,000. In part, this was due to the marketing consulting work of Marion-based Frank Magid and his firm, Frank N. Magid Associates; WMT-TV was the firm's first client, and its success attracted other station groups to the company.

In the late 1960s, KWWL and KCRG began to make significant investments in local news programming that made them competitive in the market and eroded WMT-TV's lead, with KWWL pulling nearly level with channel 2 by 1979. At the time, WMT-TV made what was perceived by viewers and television critics to be a mistake in ousting meteorologist Craig Johnson in favor of Bill Bailey, a popular comedic weatherman in the Quad Cities market at WOC-TV. However, in his time on air at channel 2, ratings fell, and KWWL surpassed the station in the ratings; Bailey left and returned to the Quad Cities. During the time KWWL ascended to first place in the market, its news director was Grant Price, who had previously parted ways with WMT-TV in 1972 over philosophical differences.

KGAN remained in second place in the 1980s, managing to hold off a challenge from KCRG. In 1989, the station reshuffled its anchor lineup. Dave Shay moved to the noon news after 30 years, a step toward retirement, and the station opted not to renew the contract of meteorologist Dave Towne, who several weeks later began working at KCRG. His replacement, Mark Strehl, lasted two years; when his contract was not renewed, he characterized KGAN as a "revolving door" with constant anchor changes. By 1994, KGAN was in third place in many news time slots; where KWWL and KCRG each had audience shares of 29% or greater at 5, 6, and 10 p.m., only at 10 p.m. did the station attract more than half as many viewers as second-place KCRG.

In March 2001, KGAN began producing a 9 p.m. newscast for Sinclair-owned KDSM-TV in Des Moines. After KGAN began providing services to KFXA in 2002, the program was renamed to Fox News at Nine and began to air in Eastern Iowa that October. A 7 a.m. news hour was added to KFXA in 2011.

The station has won two George Foster Peabody Awards. The first award, in 1955, came for its role in developing The Secret of Flight television programs. These shows, focusing on aeronautical education, were made possible with the assistance of Alexander Lippisch, who was the director of the Collins Aeronautical Research Laboratory. In 1994, KGAN won another Peabody for a report exposing a sewer solvent scandal in which the city bought solvent at an 800 percent markup from a local chemical company. The producer of the solvent pleaded guilty to paying 235 bribes to five Cedar Rapids city employees later that year.

=== Notable former on-air staff ===
- Bob Hilton – newscaster, 1993–1996

== Subchannels ==
KGAN's transmitter is located in Rowley. The station's signal is multiplexed:

Subchannels of KGAN
| Subchannel | Res. | Short name | Programming |
|---|---|---|---|
| 2.1 | 720p | KGANCBS | CBS |
| 2.2 | 720p | FOX28 | Fox |
| 2.3 | 480i | Quest | Quest |
