= KXEL =

Radio station in Waterloo, Iowa

Coordinates: 42°10′48″N 92°18′38″W

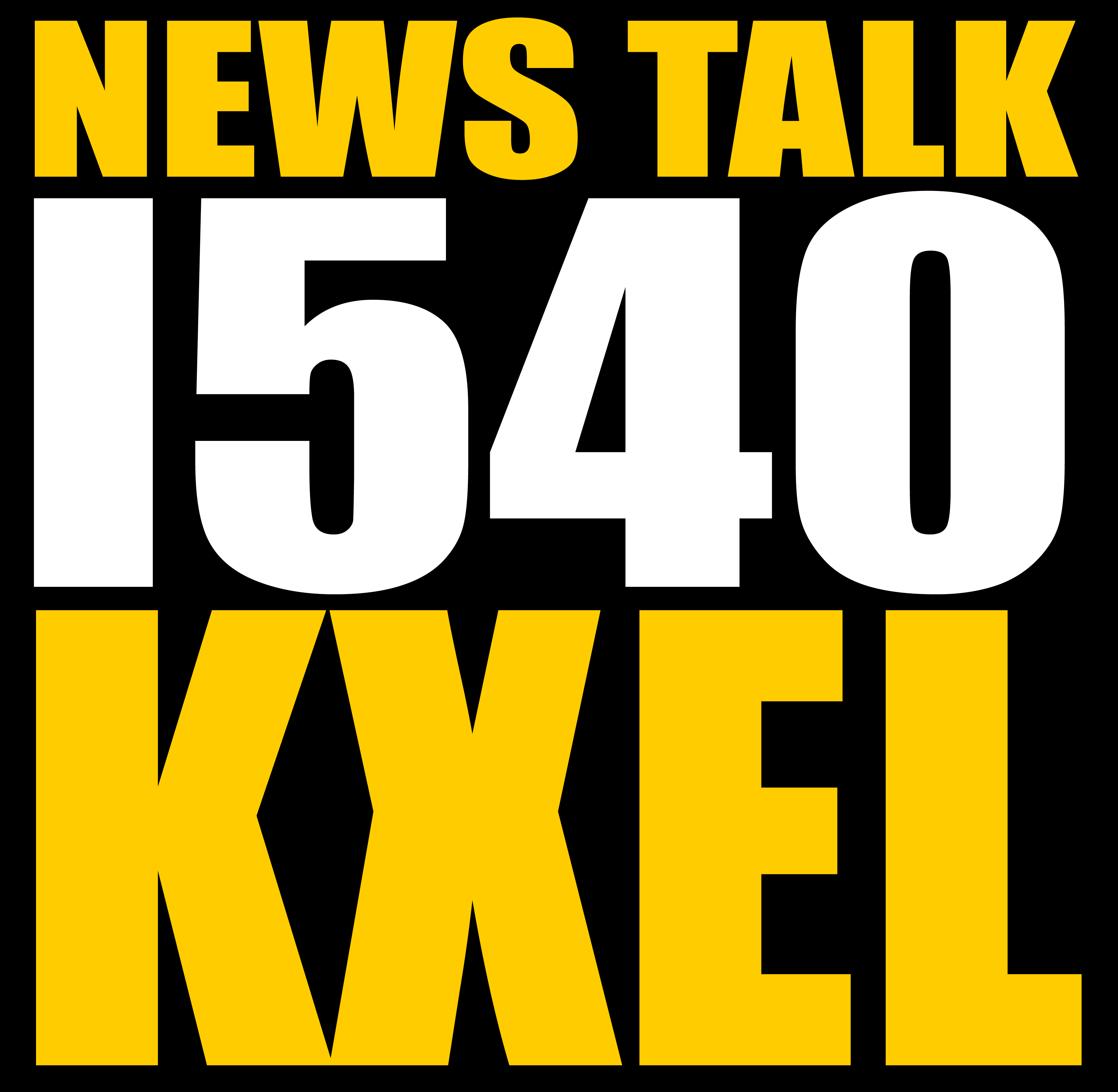
- Waterloo, Iowa; United States
- Broadcast area: Waterloo; Cedar Rapids
- Frequency: 1540 kHz
- Branding: KXEL News/Talk 1540

Programming
- Format: Talk radio
- Affiliations: Fox News Radio; Compass Media Networks; Premiere Networks; Westwood One

Ownership
- Owner: NRG Media (sale to Cedar Basin Media) pending); (NRG License Sub, LLC)
- Sister stations: KFMW; KOKZ; KPTY

History
- First air date: July 14, 1942
- Call sign meaning: "Excel"

Technical information
- Licensing authority: FCC
- Facility ID: 35950
- Class: A
- Power: 50,000 watts
- Translator: 100.5 K263BZ (Waterloo)

Links
- Public license information: Public file; LMS
- Webcast: Listen live
- Website: www.kxel.com

KXEL (1540 AM), branded as News/Talk 1540, is a commercial radio station licensed to Waterloo, Iowa, United States, serving the Waterloo and Cedar Rapids metropolitan areas with a talk format. It is owned by NRG Media with studios and offices on Jefferson Street in Waterloo near U.S. Route 218 (Leo P. Rooff Expressway). Programming is also heard on FM translator K263BZ at 100.5 MHz.

KXEL is one of two Class A stations in Iowa, along with WHO in Des Moines, broadcasting at the maximum power, 50,000 watts. By day, KXEL has a non-directional signal. But at night, to protect other stations on 1540 AM from interference, it uses a two-tower array. The transmitter is near Dysart on the Benton/Tama County line. KXEL provides secondary coverage to most of eastern Iowa during the day (as far west as Des Moines, as far south as Ottumwa and as far east as Dubuque and as far north as Mason City). ZNS-1 1540 in Nassau, Bahamas, shares Class A status with KXEL, so KXEL's nighttime pattern is a cardioid-shaped pattern aimed north. With a good radio, KXEL's skywave signal can be heard after dark throughout much of the Northern Plains States and the Canadian Prairies.

== History ==
=== Early years ===
KXEL signed on the air on July 14, 1942, the first radio station in Waterloo. It was owned by the Josh Higgins Broadcasting Company with its studios in the Waterloo Insurance Building. It was an affiliate of the NBC Blue Network, carrying its news, sports, dramas and comedies during the "Golden Age of Radio." (The Blue Network later became ABC Radio.)

In the early days of broadcasting, most stations went on the air with low power, gradually boosting the wattage by applying for increases to the Federal Communications Commission (FCC). But KXEL was granted 50,000 watts in its early days, in an effort to give a good radio signal to remote sections of Iowa and adjacent states.

=== FM and TV stations ===
On November 16, 1947, KXEL added a sister station, KXEL-FM. It began broadcasting on 105.7 MHz. It was licensed to the Josh Higgins Broadcasting Company, which also held the license for KXEL. It mostly simulcast the same programming as 1540 AM. But few people owned FM receivers in that era and management saw little opportunity to make the station profitable. KXEL-FM was take off the air in the 1950s. KXEL tried FM radio again in 1962 and that station today is KOKZ with a classic hits format.

In the early 1950s, KXEL filed for a television license in Waterloo, seeking to go on the air on channel 7. However, Waterloo's other powerhouse radio station, KWWL (now KPTY) wanted the license as well. KXEL and KWWL went to court and battled it out. KXEL was so sure it would win that it built a new studio large enough to accommodate a television station. This studio was mainly useless because KWWL won the lawsuit and signed on KWWL-TV on November 29, 1953. Interestingly, KXEL and KPTY today are co-owned.

=== Changes in ownership ===
On November 9, 1958, the station was acquired by Cy N. Bahakel, who served as the general manager. As network programming moved from radio to television, KXEL began a full service radio format of news, sports and country music. It carried world and national news from ABC Radio, eventually becoming an affiliate of the ABC Information Network.

As FM radio became the preferred band for country music fans, KXEL switched its format. It began airing adult standards, mostly pop hits of the 1940s and 50s from ABC's "Stardust" satellite network. It later used the "Timeless" network until it ceased operations in 2010. KXEL also featured classic country programming before switching to its current news/talk format.

Woodward Broadcasting owned the station between 2011 and December 2014 before selling KXEL and its sister stations. Woodward sold to the current owner, NRG Media LLC, based in Cedar Rapids.

In September 2026, it was announced that NRG Radio would sell all four stations in the Waterloo–Cedar Rapids cluster to Civic Media's subsidiary Cedar Basin Media for an undisclosed amount.

== Programming ==
Weekdays on KXEL begin with the KXEL Morning News with Tim Harwood, followed by a local talk and interview program hosted by Jeff Stein. The rest of the schedule is nationally syndicated conservative talk shows.

Beginning in the Fall of 2023, radio historian Steve Darnall, publisher of the Nostalgia Digest, hosts "Radio's Golden Age" Sunday nights from 6 - 9 pm on KXEL.
