= WDBQ (AM) =

- Dubuque, Iowa; United States
- Broadcast area: Dubuque and Vicinity
- Frequency: 1490 kHz
- Branding: WDBQ NewsTalk 1490 AM

Programming
- Format: News/talk/sports
- Affiliations: ABC News Radio; Fox News Radio; CBS Sports Radio; Premiere Networks; Westwood One; Chicago Cubs Radio Network; Iowa Hawkeyes football

Ownership
- Owner: Townsquare Media; (Townsquare License, LLC)
- Sister stations: KLYV, KXGE, WDBQ-FM, WJOD

History
- First air date: 1925
- Former call signs: WKBB (1925–1951)
- Former frequencies: 1400 kHz (1925–1928); 1310 kHz (1928–1933); 1500 kHz (1933–1941)
- Call sign meaning: Dubuque

Technical information
- Licensing authority: FCC
- Facility ID: 12705
- Class: C
- Power: 1,000 watts unlimited
- Transmitter coordinates: 42°30′10″N 90°42′24″W

Links
- Public license information: Public file; LMS
- Website: wdbqam.com

WDBQ (1490 kHz) is an AM radio station broadcasting a talk radio format. Located in Dubuque, Iowa, United States, the station is owned by Townsquare Media and licensed to Townsquare License, LLC.

The station is one of six on the Iowa AM broadcast band, where stations are normally assigned call letters beginning with K, with a call sign beginning with W. Although the five other call signs were granted before the boundary between K and W call signs was moved to the Mississippi River in 1923, WKBB was allowed to keep its W call sign when it moved from western Illinois in 1939, and again in 1951, when it changed from WKBB to WDBQ in order to have the same base call sign as its FM station – an exception also granted to WSUI and WMT elsewhere in Iowa.

== History ==
The station was first licensed, as WKBB, on September 30, 1925, to Sanders Brothers at 607 Jefferson Street in Joliet, Illinois, for operation on 1400 kHz. The call sign was randomly issued from a sequential roster of available call letters.

Following the establishment of the Federal Radio Commission (FRC), stations were initially issued a series of temporary authorizations starting on May 3, 1927. In addition, they were informed that if they wanted to continue operating, they needed to file a formal license application by January 15, 1928, as the first step in determining whether they met the new "public interest, convenience, or necessity" standard. On May 25, 1928, the FRC issued General Order 32, which notified 164 stations, including WKBB, that "From an examination of your application for future license it does not find that public interest, convenience, or necessity would be served by granting it." As part of its review, the FRC announced that WKBB had been eliminated, by consolidating with another Joliet station, WCLS. However, WKBB actually successfully convinced the commission that it should remain licensed, and on November 11, 1928, when the FRC made a major reallocation of station transmitting frequencies as part of a reorganization resulting from its implementation of General Order 40, WKBB was assigned to 1310 kHz, sharing time with WCLS and three other stations.

In 1931, the station's ownership wanted to move WKBB to Dubuque, Iowa, which did not have any radio stations. However, the complicated licensing quota system put into place by the Davis Amendment to the Radio Act of 1927 limited the number of stations that could be assigned to various states, and at this time Iowa was above its quota limit, so the FRC had to prohibit station relocations to that state. Blocked from making its preferred move, WKBB's application was modified to instead relocate within Illinois, to East Dubuque, just across the state line from Dubuque. This was granted in 1932 over the objections of the Dubuque Telegraph Herald, which desired to build its own station but could not due to the quota restriction. The Davis Amendment was repealed in 1936; WKBB received permission to move from 1310 to 1500 kHz and relocate to Dubuque the next year. On March 29, 1941, most of the stations on 1500 kHz, including WKBB, were moved to 1490 kHz, its location ever since, as part of the implementation of the North American Regional Broadcasting Agreement.

As of September 2009, WDBQ's weekday programming includes Michael Smerconish, Laura Ingraham, Rush Limbaugh, Sean Hannity and Fred Thompson. Sports on WDBQ includes the Chicago Cubs, Chicago Bulls, and Chicago Bears as well as Loras College football and basketball, high school sports, The Indy Racing League and ESPN Radio. Kim Komando's technology advice show can be heard Saturday mornings.

On August 30, 2013, a deal was announced in which Cumulus Media would swap its stations in Dubuque (including WDBQ) and Poughkeepsie, New York, to Townsquare Media in exchange for Peak Broadcasting's stations in Fresno, California. The deal was part of Cumulus' acquisition of Dial Global; Townsquare, Peak, and Dial Global were all controlled by Oaktree Capital Management. The transaction was consummated effective November 14, 2013.
