= KXIC =

Radio station in Iowa City, Iowa

- Iowa City, Iowa; United States
- Broadcast area: Cedar Rapids; Johnson County
- Frequency: 800 kHz
- Branding: KXIC 800

Programming
- Format: Sports
- Affiliations: Fox Sports Radio; Iowa Hawkeyes Radio Network; Chicago Cubs Radio Network

Ownership
- Owner: iHeartMedia, Inc.; (iHM Licenses, LLC)
- Sister stations: KKRQ, KKSY-FM, KMJM, KOSY-FM, WMT

History
- First air date: June 7, 1947
- Call sign meaning: Iowa City

Technical information
- Licensing authority: FCC
- Facility ID: 29075
- Class: D
- Power: 1,000 watts day; 199 watts night
- Transmitter coordinates: 41°41′15″N 91°32′39″W

Links
- Public license information: Public file; LMS
- Webcast: Listen Live
- Website: kxic.iheart.com

KXIC (800 AM) is a commercial radio station licensed to Iowa City, Iowa, and serving the Cedar Rapids area as well as Johnson County. The station is owned by iHeartMedia and licensed to iHM Licenses, LLC. It airs a sports radio format, with some news and talk shows. Most programming comes from Fox Sports Radio.

KXIC operates on 800 kHz, a Mexican clear channel frequency reserved for XEROK in Ciudad Juárez. As a result, it reduces power at night from 1,000 watts to 199; prior to 1986, it broadcast during the daytime only. It uses a directional antenna for both daytime and nighttime operation.

== History ==
The Johnson County Broadcasting Corporation received a construction permit for a new daytime-only radio station in Iowa City from the Federal Communications Commission on December 15, 1947. The permittee was formed by four war veterans, two with prior involvement at WSUI and two employed other stations in the region and sought to bring the first commercial station to Iowa City (WSUI is owned by the University of Iowa). KXIC began broadcasting on June 6, 1948, as an independent outlet. The station was the originating outlet for radio broadcasts of Iowa Hawkeyes football, feeding a statewide network for decades; Gene Claussen called games until the 1980s, when the Hawkeyes consolidated their network under one broadcast originating at WHO. George M. Ludwig, a state representative and father of space scientist George H. Ludwig, served as KXIC's farm editor for 11 years before his death in 1959. While he was in college at the University of Iowa, future NBC newsman Tom Pettit worked at KXIC.

In the 1960s, Interstate 80 was constructed in Iowa. For several years, KXIC protested the condemnation of part of its transmitter site land for use to build the new highway, as the 8.47 acres of land seized was crucial to the station's future plans to increase power from 1,000 to 5,000 watts. The radio station had initially been awarded $13,200 by a commission seizing land for the interstate, but it appealed the award, asking for $75,000 and later $100,000. The case reached the Iowa Supreme Court before it was returned to Johnson County district court, where a jury awarded the station $53,250; the higher court overturned the award because it included inadmissible evidence about a power increase it felt was infeasible. After the interstate was built, studies were conducted to ensure that lighting on the nearby interchange with Dubuque Street did not interfere with KXIC's operation.

With the door shut on an increase to 5,000 watts, KXIC opted to expand into FM broadcasting. In May 1966, KXIC-FM 100.7 signed on. In addition to a new FM station, KXIC constructed expanded studios at the transmitter site.

Former logo

After more than three decades of broadcasting, the Johnson County Broadcasting Company sold KXIC and the FM station, at that time known as KICG, to Tom Ingstad's Red River Valley Broadcasting Corporation in 1979 for $975,000. In the early 1980s, the station jettisoned its longtime full-service middle of the road format to take on country music sound; KXIC then adopted the syndicated Music of Your Life oldies/adult standards format in 1984. Two years later, in September 1986, KXIC was allowed to broadcast at night for the first time, picking up NBC Talknet programs. Several months later, KXIC flipped to classic hits.

Ingstad reached a deal to sell KXIC and KKRQ to Heartland Media, a group headed by Ron Hamilton, in 1987 for $2.3 million. The transaction, however, never closed, and it was not until 1997 that Ingstad would sell the pair to Jacor for $8 million, with KXIC having moved to a news/talk format. Through all of the changes in KXIC history, one fixture remained constant: a daily 15-minute show hosted by Dottie Ray, who had been at the station since 1956 and began the daily show in 1959, hosting the show for 55 years until 2014 and interviewing 32,397 guests on more than 14,000 broadcasts. Her show had survived the Ingstad purchase when advertisers pulled their support upon the announcement of the program's cancellation, prompting its restoration.
