= KFMW =

Radio station in Waterloo, Iowa

Coordinates: 42.401°N 91.844°W

- Waterloo, Iowa; United States
- Broadcast area: Waterloo–Cedar Rapids
- Frequency: 107.9 MHz
- Branding: Rock 108

Programming
- Format: Active rock
- Affiliations: United Stations Radio Networks

Ownership
- Owner: NRG Media (sale to Cedar Basin Media) pending); (NRG License Sub, LLC)
- Sister stations: KOKZ; KPTY; KXEL

History
- First air date: November 1968
- Former call signs: KWWL-FM (1968–1972)
- Call sign meaning: "FM Waterloo"

Technical information
- Licensing authority: FCC
- Facility ID: 51664
- Class: C
- ERP: 95,500 watts; 100,000 watts (maximum)
- HAAT: 550 meters (1,800 ft)

Links
- Public license information: Public file; LMS
- Webcast: Listen live
- Website: www.rock108.com

KFMW (107.9 FM), known as "Rock 108", is a radio station licensed to Waterloo, Iowa, United States. It is owned by NRG Media of Cedar Rapids and has its studios in nearby Hiawatha. The station has an active rock format. Its signal is transmitted from the AFLAC Tower north of Rowley, Iowa.

== History ==
On June 30, 1966, the Federal Communications Commission approved an application from Black Hawk Broadcasting Company, owner of Waterloo AM radio station KWWL and TV station KWWL-TV, to build a new FM radio station on 107.9 MHz. The station would be transmitted from a 2,000-foot (610 m) tower Black Hawk was planning to build for KWWL-TV. The tower, near Rowley, received Federal Aviation Administration approval in 1967,

KWWL-FM went on the air in November 1968 and changed call signs to KFMW on November 20, 1972. Black Hawk Broadcasting merged into American Family Broadcasting, the broadcast division of insurer American Family Corporation (today better known as Aflac), in a deal announced in 1979 and completed in 1980. In the deal, Black Hawk spun off all of its other broadcast stations except KWWL-TV and KTIV in Sioux City to meet FCC ownership limits. KWWL-AM and KFMW-FM were sold to the Wisconsin-based Forward Communications Corporation for $3,477,500. Operations of the two stations as KWWL-AM was officially renamed KWLO-AM, both KWLO and KFMW were moved out of the KWWL-TV building on Fourth Street to a former post office annex on Jefferson Street in downtown Waterloo.

Since its inception, KFMW had aired a Beautiful Music format, but after ratings steeply declined in the late 1970s and early 1980s, Forward flipped the station to a Top 40/CHR format on November 1, 1982. On November 27, 1983, the KWWL–KFMW tower was felled in an ice storm.

Forward Communications was sold in late 1984 to Wesray Capital Corporation, which retained the Forward name for its media holdings. As early as 1985, Wesray indicated its intention to sell all of Forward's radio stations. KWLO and KFMW were sold to Park Communications in 1986 at a time when Forward was selling most of its broadcasting properties. In 1992, the station shifted from contemporary hit radio to album-oriented rock.

In 1994, Park Communications sold itself to Donald R. Tomlin and Gary B. Knapp in a deal backed by the Retirement Systems of Alabama pension fund. The new owners decided the next year to sell all of the company's radio holdings. Bahakel Communications, owner of KXEL and KOKZ radio stations in Waterloo, bought KWLO and KFMW from Park in 1996.

Previous logo

The Bahakel cluster was sold to Woodward Communications of Dubuque, in 2012, and to NRG Radio in 2014.

In September 2026, it was announced that NRG Radio would sell all four stations in the Waterloo–Cedar Rapids cluster to Civic Media's subsidiary Cedar Basin Media for an undisclosed amount.
