= KZIA =

Radio station in Cedar Rapids, Iowa

- Cedar Rapids, Iowa; United States
- Broadcast area: Cedar Rapids-Iowa City
- Frequency: 102.9 MHz (HD Radio)
- Branding: Z102.9

Programming
- Format: Top 40 (CHR)
- Subchannels: HD2: Smart-FM (80s hits); HD3: KGYM simulcast (Sports); HD4: X107.5 (Alternative rock)

Ownership
- Owner: KZIA, Inc.
- Sister stations: KGYM

History
- First air date: April 25, 1975
- Former call signs: KOWC (1974-1975, pre-sign on); KICR (1975, pre-sign on); KQCR (1975–1995); KXMX (1995–1998)
- Call sign meaning: Common "Z" branding for pop stations inspired by WHTZ, IA is the postal abbreviation for Iowa

Technical information
- Licensing authority: FCC
- Facility ID: 35556
- Class: C1
- ERP: 100,000 watts
- HAAT: 287 meters (942 ft)
- Transmitter coordinates: 42.057°N 91.695°W
- Translator: See § HD Radio digital channels

Links
- Public license information: Public file; LMS
- Webcast: Listen live HD2: Listen live HD3: Listen live HD4: Listen live
- Website: kzia.com HD2: smart80s.com HD3: kgymradio.com HD4: x1075iowa.com

KZIA, known as "Z 102.9", is a radio station based in Cedar Rapids, Iowa. It has a Top 40 (CHR) format primarily staffed with local personalities, including morning DJs Dancin' Eric Hanson, Clare Duffy, and Producer Ben, known as “The Morning Scramble.” Eric and Clare were recognized as the Iowa Broadcasters of the Year in 2022 by the Iowa Broadcasters Association. Other hosts include Chad Taylor and Jaidyn at Night. The station's transmitter is located in Hiawatha, Iowa, and its signal reaches most of eastern Iowa, including Cedar Rapids, Iowa City, Waterloo, and the Quad Cities area. It also reaches Prairie du Chien, and Platteville, both in Wisconsin.

== History ==
On April 25, 1975, the station would sign on as KQCR, and aired a Top 40/CHR format branded as "Q103". KQCR became the dominant CHR station in Eastern Iowa; it initially aired automated programming before going live full-time in 1983. In 1994, Rob Norton Jr. and Eliot Keller, owners of KRNA, purchased KQCR to create the Cedar Rapids market's first radio duopoly. On September 5, 1995, KQCR changed its format to country music and its call letters to KXMX, "Max 102.9". The country format lasted almost three years until Norton and Keller agreed to sell KRNA and KXMX to Texas-based Capstar Broadcasting. While the KRNA sale was successful, Capstar terminated the agreement to buy KXMX. Norton and Keller kept the station, changing their format back to Top 40 and the call letters to KZIA on June 12, 1998. Today, KZIA is the only locally owned commercial FM station in the Cedar Rapids market, as most of the commercial FMs in the area are owned by either iHeartMedia or Townsquare Media.

On October 31, 2006, KZIA acquired the former KCRG radio (1600 AM) from Gazette Communications. KZIA renamed the station KGYM and moved its studios from downtown Cedar Rapids to the KZIA studios on the city's southwest side. KGYM-AM simulcasts on 102.3 FM. KZIA also airs sports programming on their HD Radio signal, KZIA-HD3. KZIA-HD3 feeds Iowa City translator K292FZ (106.3 FM).

== Smart FM ==
The station airs an all-1980s hits format on KZIA-HD2 titled "Smart FM". Originally named "ROBfm" after Norton, and airing an adult hits/classic rock format, it was renamed to "Smart FM" after Norton's death on January 29, 2018, at the age of 69. On August 8, 2020, KZIA-HD2 shifted to all-1980s hits, while retaining the "Smart FM" branding. KZIA-HD2 is also relayed over FM radio through FM translator stations 95.1 K236AA in Cedar Rapids, and 98.5 K253BE in Iowa City. Despite each frequency limited to a low power of 250 watts, the use of two translators allows coverage for both Linn and Johnson counties. The station can also be heard throughout other counties in eastern Iowa via the primary 102.9-HD2 signal through an HD Radio receiver.

== HD Radio digital channels ==
On May 14, 2003, KZIA became the first Iowa radio station to broadcast in HD Radio.

KZIA initially aired two channels of sports programming on two HD Radio sub-channels. Originally, there was one channel of sports programming on KZIA-HD3, which was just a simulcast of sister station KGYM, but would later split into two channels on the HD3 and HD4 sub-channels. KZIA-HD3 feeds Iowa City translator K292FZ (106.3 FM), and KZIA-HD4 fed Cedar Rapids translator K298BM (107.5 FM). This allowed up to three different sports programs at once (listeners may hear a Cedar Rapids High School sports game on 107.5, with one from Iowa City on 106.3, and a game that is the most anticipated for both areas on the main 1600 station). To designate different frequencies, 106.3 is known as the "South Gym", 107.5 was the "North Gym", and 1600 is the "Main Gym".

In January 2020, KGYM began simulcasting on translator K272GB (102.3 FM) in Cedar Rapids, and began redirecting listeners to the new frequency. The following month, K298BM/KZIA-HD4 split from the KGYM simulcast and began airing a separate sports talk format as "Gym OT." The schedule consisted of hot talk/male-oriented talk shows and sports betting shows, along with ESPN Radio and SportsMap Radio programming. On January 1, 2022, K298BM/KZIA-HD4 flipped to alternative rock as "X107.5."

The station's HD signal is multiplexed:

Call sign	Frequency & Subchannel	Format	Branding	Translators
KZIA HD1	102.9-1 FM	Top 40 (CHR)	Z 102.9 (Main Programming)	—
KZIA HD2	102.9-2 FM	'80s Hits	Smart-FM	95.1 K236AA (Cedar Rapids); 98.5 K253BE (Iowa City)
KZIA HD3	102.9-3 FM	Sports	KGYM/ESPN Radio/South Gym	See KGYM § Translators
KZIA HD4	102.9-4 FM	Alternative rock	X107.5	107.5 K298BM (Cedar Rapids)
