= KMRY =

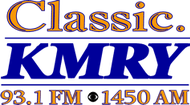
- Cedar Rapids, Iowa; United States
- Frequency: 1450 kHz
- Branding: Classic KMRY

Programming
- Format: Classic hits
- Affiliations: ABC News Radio

Ownership
- Owner: Jim Ecker; (Ecker Broadcasting Co.)

History
- First air date: August 14, 1949
- Former call signs: KWCR (1949–1952); KPIG (1952–1962); KLWW (1962–1980); KCDR (1980–1988)
- Call sign meaning: "Memory", from adult standards format in 1988

Technical information
- Licensing authority: FCC
- Facility ID: 17697
- Class: C
- Power: 1,000 watts (unlimited)
- Transmitter coordinates: 42°00′25″N 91°42′29″W (KMRY)
- Translator: 93.1 K226BO (Cedar Rapids)

Links
- Public license information: Public file; LMS
- Webcast: Listen Live
- Website: yourkmry.com

KMRY (1450 AM, "Classic KMRY") is a radio station licensed to serve Cedar Rapids, Iowa, owned by Jim Ecker, through licensee Ecker Broadcasting Co.

The station was assigned the KMRY call letters by the Federal Communications Commission on November 21, 1988.

The station formerly aired Top 40, country, and adult standards formats.

== Awards ==
In September 2002, the station (as KLWW, its 1960s incarnation) was inducted into the Iowa Rock & Roll Hall of Fame.

In November 2002, then-station owner and long-time morning host Rick Sellers was honored with the Cedar Rapids Freedom Festival Peter Teahen Award.

== Programming ==
The station broadcasts 24 hours a day, 7 days a week. The bulk of its music programming, the "Greatest Hits of All Time," consists of Top 40 hits from the mid-1960s to the mid-1980s. The station carries ABC Radio news at the top of every hour. Music broadcasts at hours not listed below, including the evenings weekdays, are automated.

The station employs two main LIVE on-air personalities; Morning Show Host (Jerry Wright), and Afternoon Host (Holly 'Stevie' Penuel)

Additionally, the station is the home for Cedar Rapids and Marion, IA High School athletics.

Corridor Blend is hosted by recording artist Faye Dudley from 5pm to 7pm Saturday nights. Each show Faye plays music by local Iowa artists and interviews them regarding their journey in their music career. Musicians also play some of their songs live in the studio which makes for a fun time.

Jukebox Rewind Live dives into the oldies live with Frank Balvanz from 7pm to 9pm Saturday nights. Each show he chooses his music based on a specific theme for that weekend.

On Sunday mornings, the station airs Sunday Morning Church Services from First Lutheran Church In Cedar Rapids (8:30 – 9:00 am).

The Sunday Morning Polka Show is on from 9am to noon. Frank Balvanz keeps the shows tradition alive as he plays both physical records and digital music.

== HD radio ==
In 2004, KMRY became the first AM radio station in Iowa to implement HD Radio broadcasting. On January 4, 2004, the first consumer sale of a commercial HD radio, a Kenwood model KTC-HR 100 converter, was made at Ultimate Electronics in Cedar Rapids as a publicity stunt before the national debut at the Consumer Electronics Show in Las Vegas later that week. As of September 2012, the station was no longer broadcasting in HD.

== FM radio ==
On July 1, 2011, KMRY began simulcasting its AM programming on FM, broadcasting a 250 watt signal on 93.1 MHz from translator K226BO in Cedar Rapids, Iowa (originally located in Anamosa, Iowa).
