= KOSY-FM =

- Anamosa, Iowa; United States
- Broadcast area: Cedar Rapids metropolitan area
- Frequency: 95.7 MHz
- Branding: Sports Radio 95.7

Programming
- Format: Sports radio
- Affiliations: Fox Sports Radio; Iowa Hawkeyes

Ownership
- Owner: iHeartMedia, Inc.; (iHM Licenses, LLC)
- Sister stations: KKRQ, KKSY-FM, KMJM, KXIC, WMT

History
- First air date: February 14, 2008; 18 years ago (as KKSY)
- Former call signs: KKSY (2007–2012); KWMG (2012–2013)

Technical information
- Licensing authority: FCC
- Facility ID: 162475
- Class: C3
- ERP: 18,000 watts
- HAAT: 118 meters (387 ft)
- Transmitter coordinates: 42°3′39″N 91°32′36″W

Links
- Public license information: Public file; LMS
- Webcast: Listen live (via iHeartRadio)
- Website: sportsradio957.iheart.com

KOSY-FM (95.7 MHz) is a radio station licensed to Anamosa, Iowa, and serving the Cedar Rapids metropolitan area. It airs a sports radio format and is owned by iHeartMedia, Inc. The station's studios are located within iHeartMedia's Cedar Rapids cluster at Broadcast Park on the city's northeast side, next to dual CBS/Fox affiliate KGAN.

KOSY-FM has an effective radiated power (ERP) of 18,000 watts. The transmitter is on Radio Road near Iowa Highway 13 in Marion.

== History ==
The station signed on the air at 10 a.m. on February 14, 2008. Its call sign was KKSY and it aired a country music format, branded as "Kiss Country 95.7".

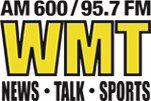
Logo as a simulcast of WMT

Clear Channel Communications began simulcasting KKSY's programming on WMT-FM (96.5 FM) at 9 a.m. on December 27, 2011. The country format moved to 96.5 FM exclusively on January 2, 2012 (with the KKSY-FM call letters following a few weeks later), and 95.7 FM began simulcasting the news/talk programming of sister station WMT, eventually changing call letters to KWMG. On March 1, 2013, KWMG changed its call letters to the current KOSY-FM.

On August 18, 2014, KOSY-FM dropped the WMT simulcast, and flipped to Top 40/CHR as "Y95.7". On October 2, 2017, KOSY-FM rebranded as "Hot 95.7".

On August 5, 2024, at 10 a.m., following that day's broadcast of Elvis Duran and the Morning Show, KOSY-FM flipped to sports radio as "Sports Radio 95.7", duplicating the lineup and local programming of Des Moines sister station KXNO. The station also carries programming from Fox Sports Radio, and simulcasts all Iowa Hawkeyes broadcasts with WMT.
