= The Gazette (Cedar Rapids, Iowa) =

Daily print newspaper in Cedar Rapids, Iowa

- The July 27, 2005, front page of The Gazette
- Type: Daily newspaper
- Format: Broadsheet
- Owner: Adams MultiMedia
- Editor: Zack Kucharski
- Founded: 1883 (143 years ago)
- Language: English
- Headquarters: 116 3rd St Southeast; Cedar Rapids, Iowa 52401; United States
- Circulation: 32,616 Daily; 35,975 Saturday; 37,860 Sunday (as of 2019)
- ISSN: 1066-0291
- Website: www.thegazette.com

The Gazette is an online newspaper that is published three times a week in Cedar Rapids, Iowa. The newspaper is distributed throughout northeastern and east-central Iowa, including the Cedar Rapids and Iowa City metropolitan areas. It was formerly called The Cedar Rapids Gazette. As of September 2019, The Gazette has a circulation of 32,616 for the daily edition and 37,860 for the Sunday edition.

== History ==
The Evening Gazette was first published on January 10, 1883. The paper was co-founded by Lucian H. Post and Elbridge T. Otis. In March 1884, the paper was sold to Clarence Miller and Fred Faulkes. Their descendants would run the paper for the next century.

In 1927, the Gazette bought The Republican and changed its name to The Evening Gazette and Republican. The name was changed again in 1932 to Cedar Rapids Gazette. The word "The" was added to the name in 1936. That same year the paper won a Pulitzer Prize for its reporting on corruption in state government related to illegal gambling and liquor sales.

In 1979, the paper's name was changed to The Gazette.

In 1982, Tom Ecker first published his rebus word puzzles called Wuzzles in The Gazette. Using the name Tom Underwood, Ecker eventually became syndicated with his puzzles appearing around the world. Ecker stopped creating Wuzzles in 2024, after 30,000 of them, and King Features Syndicate now distributes reruns.

In 1986, The Gazette Company formed an employee stock ownership plan which purchased about 38% of outstanding stock. The company became 100% employee owned in 2012 and was renamed to Folience in 2017.

In January 2025, the newspaper announced it will cut back the number of print edition days from seven to three a week on Wednesdays, Saturdays and Sundays. In November 2025, Folience sold The Gazette and 11 other community newspapers to Adams MultiMedia.

== TV and radio ==
The Gazette Company owned KCRG-TV (the call letters stand for "Cedar Rapids Gazette") until selling it to Gray Television, with the transfer being completed on October 1, 2015. The company also owned KCRG radio (1600 AM) until selling the station to the owners of another local broadcaster, KZIA FM 102.9. The sale was completed on October 31, 2006, with the radio station's call letters changing to KGYM as a result. SourceMedia Group also owned Decisionmark, which runs the TitanTV website, until selling it to a syndicate led by Turnstone Capital and Capitol Broadcasting Company.
