= KXGM (FM) =

Air 1 radio station in Hiawatha–Cedar Rapids, Iowa

- Hiawatha, Iowa; United States
- Broadcast area: Cedar Rapids, Iowa
- Frequency: 89.1 MHz (HD Radio)
- Branding: Air1

Programming
- Format: Christian worship
- Subchannels: HD2: K-Love; HD3: Radio Nueva Vida
- Affiliations: Air1

Ownership
- Owner: Educational Media Foundation

History
- First air date: July 2002
- Former call signs: KWOF-FM (2002–2008); KXGM-FM (2008–2015)
- Call sign meaning: "God'x Extreme Grace and Mercy"

Technical information
- Licensing authority: FCC
- Facility ID: 85165
- Class: C3
- ERP: 3,600 watts
- HAAT: 94 meters (308 ft)
- Transmitter coordinates: 42°03′13″N 91°44′35″W
- Translator: HD2: 103.9 K280HA (Hiawatha)

Links
- Public license information: Public file; LMS
- Webcast: Listen Live; Listen Live (HD2)
- Website: air1.com; klove.com (HD2); nuevavida.com (HD3)

KXGM (89.1 MHz, "Air 1") is an FM radio station licensed to serve Hiawatha, Iowa, United States. The station is owned by Educational Media Foundation. It airs a Christian worship music format.

The station was assigned the KWOF-FM call letters by the Federal Communications Commission on July 17, 2002 and changed its call letters to KXGM-FM on August 8, 2008, to reflect the new ownership. The station changed to its current KXGM call sign on March 25, 2015.

== Ownership ==
On March 21, 2002, more than five years after first applying for the frequency in January 1997, Friendship Communications Inc. was awarded a construction permit for 89.1 FM over fellow applicants American Family Association and the University of Northern Iowa. The station began broadcasting as a simulcast of KWOF in July 2002. KWOF-FM applied on July 11, 2002, for a license to cover and a waiver of the "main studio" rule that requires that a broadcaster maintain its main broadcast studio in its city of license. This waiver request was denied and thus the license to cover request was also dismissed. On May 17, 2004, Friendship Communications again applied for a license to cover and this was granted on July 7, 2004.

In March 2008, Extreme Grace Media (Chris Behmlander, president) reached an agreement to purchase KWOF (AM) and KWOF-FM from Friendship Communications (Michael Facciani, president) for a reported sale price of $160,000. The transfer was approved by the FCC on April 23, 2008, and the deal was consummated on July 18, 2008. In June 2011, KXGM's license was transferred to Educational Media Foundation, and it began airing the Air 1 Christian CHR format.
