= Rowley, Iowa =

- City
- Location of Rowley, Iowa
- Coordinates: 42°22′07″N 91°50′39″W
- Country: US
- State: Iowa
- County: Buchanan

Area
  - Total: 0.39 sq mi (1.01 km^{2})
  - Land: 0.39 sq mi (1.01 km^{2})
  - Water: 0 sq mi (0.00 km^{2})
- Elevation: 984 ft (300 m)

Population (2020)
  - Total: 270
  - Density: 695.4/sq mi (268.49/km^{2})
- Time zone: UTC-6 (Central (CST))
  - Summer (DST): UTC-5 (CDT)
- ZIP code: 52329
- Area code: 319
- FIPS code: 19-69060
- GNIS feature ID: 2396442

Rowley is a city in Buchanan County, Iowa, United States. The population was 270 at the time of the 2020 census.

== History ==
Rowley was established in Homer Township when the Burlington, Cedar Rapids and Northern Railroad was built through this area in 1873.

== Geography ==
According to the United States Census Bureau, the city has a total area of 0.36 square miles (0.93 km^{2}), all land.

== Demographics ==
Historical populations
Year	Pop.	±%
1880	40	—
1930	205	+412.5%
1940	233	+13.7%
1950	249	+6.9%
1960	234	−6.0%
1970	241	+3.0%
1980	275	+14.1%
1990	272	−1.1%
2000	290	+6.6%
2010	264	−9.0%
2020	270	+2.3%
Source:"U.S. Census website". United States Census Bureau. and Iowa Data Center; Source: U.S. Decennial Census

=== 2020 census ===
As of the census of 2020, there were 270 people, 112 households, and 81 families residing in the city. The population density was 695.4 inhabitants per square mile (268.5/km^{2}). There were 116 housing units at an average density of 298.8 per square mile (115.4/km^{2}). The racial makeup of the city was 97.0% White, 0.0% Black or African American, 0.0% Native American, 0.0% Asian, 0.0% Pacific Islander, 0.4% from other races and 2.6% from two or more races. Hispanic or Latino persons of any race comprised 1.1% of the population.

Of the 112 households, 28.6% of which had children under the age of 18 living with them, 57.1% were married couples living together, 4.5% were cohabitating couples, 21.4% had a female householder with no spouse or partner present and 17.0% had a male householder with no spouse or partner present. 27.7% of all households were non-families. 20.5% of all households were made up of individuals, 11.6% had someone living alone who was 65 years old or older.

The median age in the city was 44.0 years. 25.6% of the residents were under the age of 20; 4.8% were between the ages of 20 and 24; 20.7% were from 25 and 44; 27.8% were from 45 and 64; and 21.1% were 65 years of age or older. The gender makeup of the city was 49.3% male and 50.7% female.

=== 2010 census ===
As of the census of 2010, there were 264 people, 108 households, and 82 families living in the city. The population density was 733.3 inhabitants per square mile (283.1/km^{2}). There were 116 housing units at an average density of 322.2 per square mile (124.4/km^{2}). The racial makeup of the city was 99.6% White and 0.4% Native American.

There were 108 households, of which 27.8% had children under the age of 18 living with them, 67.6% were married couples living together, 4.6% had a female householder with no husband present, 3.7% had a male householder with no wife present, and 24.1% were non-families. 20.4% of all households were made up of individuals, and 5.6% had someone living alone who was 65 years of age or older. The average household size was 2.44 and the average family size was 2.82.

The median age in the city was 41.8 years. 22.3% of residents were under the age of 18; 5.8% were between the ages of 18 and 24; 26.5% were from 25 to 44; 34.9% were from 45 to 64; and 10.6% were 65 years of age or older. The gender makeup of the city was 49.6% male and 50.4% female.

=== 2000 census ===
As of the census of 2000, there were 290 people, 111 households, and 85 families living in the city. The population density was 806.3 inhabitants per square mile (311.3/km^{2}). There were 114 housing units at an average density of 317.0 per square mile (122.4/km^{2}). The racial makeup of the city was 99.31% White (288 people) and 0.69% Asian (2 people). None of the population is Hispanic or Latino of any race.

There were 111 households, out of which 36.0% had children under the age of 18 living with them, 71.2% were married couples living together, 4.5% had a female householder with no husband present, and 23.4% were non-families. 21.6% of all households were made up of individuals, and 12.6% had someone living alone who was 65 years of age or older. The average household size was 2.61 and the average family size was 3.06.

In the city, the population was spread out, with 26.6% under the age of 18, 7.2% from 18 to 24, 28.3% from 25 to 44, 22.1% from 45 to 64, and 15.9% who were 65 years of age or older. The median age was 40 years. For every 100 females, there were 87.1 males. For every 100 females age 18 and over, there were 91.9 males.

The median income for a household in the city was $36,563, and the median income for a family was $41,875. Males had a median income of $35,625 versus $24,375 for females. The per capita income for the city was $17,315. About 6.0% of families and 7.1% of the population were below the poverty line, including 12.0% of those under the age of eighteen and 10.0% of those 65 or over.

== Education ==
The Independence Community School District operates area public schools.

== Constructions ==
The AFLAC Tower, a guyed television transmission tower with a height of 609.6 metres, is among the world's tallest constructions.

== Notable person ==
- Floyd Smith, physician and missionary, was born in Rowley.
