= WMT (AM) =

News/talk radio station in Cedar Rapids, Iowa

- Cedar Rapids, Iowa; United States
- Broadcast area: Eastern Iowa
- Frequency: 600 kHz
- Branding: Newsradio 600 WMT

Programming
- Format: News/talk
- Affiliations: Fox News Radio; Premiere Networks; Westwood One; Iowa Hawkeyes Radio Network

Ownership
- Owner: iHeartMedia, Inc.; (iHM Licenses, LLC)
- Sister stations: KKRQ; KKSY-FM; KMJM; KOSY-FM; KXIC

History
- First air date: July 30, 1922
- Former call signs: WJAM (1922–1928)
- Call sign meaning: Waterloo Morning Tribune (now-defunct newspaper that once owned the station)

Technical information
- Licensing authority: FCC
- Facility ID: 73593
- Class: B
- Power: 5,000 watts
- Transmitter coordinates: 42°3′40″N 91°32′42.6″W

Links
- Public license information: Public file; LMS
- Webcast: Listen live (via iHeartRadio)
- Website: 600wmtradio.iheart.com

WMT (600 kHz) is a commercial AM radio station in Cedar Rapids, Iowa. It broadcasts a news/talk radio format and is owned by iHeartMedia, Inc. The studios are co-located with former sister station KGAN-TV channel 2, near the intersection of Collins Road (Iowa Highway 100) and Old Marion Road NE in Cedar Rapids, in a building known as "Broadcast Park".

By day, WMT is powered at 5,000 watts non-directional. At night, to protect other stations on 600 AM from interference, WMT uses a directional antenna with a three-tower array. Its transmitter site is on Radio Road near Marion. WMT is a Class B station broadcasting on a Regional AM frequency.

== History ==
WMT is the oldest radio station in Cedar Rapids, Iowa. It was first licensed, as WJAM, on August 1, 1922, to Douglas "Tex" Perham. Its original call sign was randomly assigned from a sequential list of available call signs. In addition, until the January 1923 adoption of the Mississippi River as the dividing line, Iowa was one of the states normally assigned "W" call letters. The station signed on the air on July 30, 1922, with a program presented in conjunction with The Evening Gazette.

=== Waterloo Morning Tribune and Des Moines Register ===
In 1928, Harry Shaw purchased WJAM and moved the station from Cedar Rapids to Waterloo, renaming it WMT after the now-defunct Waterloo Morning Tribune newspaper which he owned. WMT was originally an affiliate of the NBC Blue Network, but flipped affiliates to CBS Radio in 1940. It carried its dramas, comedies, news and sports during the "Golden Age of Radio".

Shaw sold the station to the Cowles family, owners of the Des Moines Register, in October 1934. WMT moved back to Cedar Rapids the following year, occupying the studios of the defunct KWCR radio after KWCR's frequency was taken over by KSO in Des Moines, another Cowles station, WMT continued to operate a secondary studio in Waterloo until 1947. The Cowleses sold WMT to Delaware-based American Broadcasting Stations in 1944.

WMT-TV, the first television station in Cedar Rapids, signed on at channel 2 on September 30, 1953. On February 27, 1963, WMT-FM (now KKSY-FM) debuted at 96.5 MHz with the same song, "Don't Send Me Posies When It's Shoesies That I Need", played on the AM station's inaugural broadcast 41 years earlier.

=== Ownership changes ===
Former WMT logo, still seen on building in Broadcast Park

Ownership of the WMT stations was passed on to Orion Broadcasting of Louisville, Kentucky, in 1968. In 1981, Cosmos Broadcasting of Greenville, South Carolina, purchased WMT-AM-FM. The company had also planned to purchase WMT-TV, but the television station was sold to Guy Gannett Communications because of ownership restrictions at the time. The TV station changed its call letters to KGAN. (WMT and KGAN continue to broadcast from the same building on Collins Road, known as "Broadcast Park"; however, WMT now gets its weather reports from KCRG-TV.)

An ownership group that included former Iowa governor Robert D. Ray and sportscaster Forrest "Frosty" Mitchell purchased WMT on October 1, 1986. On January 1, 1996, Palmer Communications (owners of WHO radio in Des Moines) acquired WMT. WHO and WMT were later sold to Jacor Broadcasting, which was eventually acquired by Clear Channel Communications. In 2014, Clear Channel changed its name to iHeartMedia, Inc.

=== News/talk ===
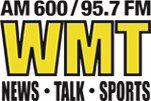
WMT logo when simulcasting on 95.7 FM

WMT has always maintained at full service staff of newscasters, agriculture reporters and sportscasters. From the 1950s to the 1980s, it played middle of the road music. It was also affiliated with CBS Radio News for world and national coverage. By the 1990s, it had eliminated all music programming and became a talk radio station. In the early 2010s, it switched its network to Fox News Radio.

Beginning January 2, 2012, WMT began simulcasting on KWMG in Anamosa at 95.7 MHz, to give WMT listeners the option to hear the station on FM. The simulcast ended on August 18, 2014. FM 95.7 is now KOSY-FM, airing a sports radio format.

== See also ==
- List of three-letter broadcast call signs in the United States
