= KCRG-TV =

Television station in Cedar Rapids, Iowa

- Cedar Rapids–Waterloo–; Iowa City–Dubuque, Iowa; United States
- City: Cedar Rapids, Iowa
- Channels: Digital: 32 (UHF); Virtual: 9
- Branding: KCRG-TV 9; KCRG 9.2; Local 9.2; CW 9.3

Programming
- Affiliations: 9.1: ABC; 9.2: Independent with MyNetworkTV; 9.3: The CW

Ownership
- Owner: Gray Media; (Gray Television Licensee, LLC)

History
- First air date: October 15, 1953
- Former call signs: KCRI-TV (1953–1954)
- Former channel numbers: Analog: 9 (VHF, 1953–2009); Digital: 52 (UHF, 2003–2009), 9 (VHF, 2009–2024)
- Call sign meaning: Cedar Rapids Gazette (former sister newspaper)

Technical information
- Licensing authority: FCC
- Facility ID: 9719
- ERP: 1,000 kW
- HAAT: 588.2 m (1,930 ft)
- Transmitter coordinates: 42°18′59″N 91°51′31″W

Links
- Public license information: Public file; LMS
- Website: www.kcrg.com

KCRG-TV (channel 9) is a television station licensed to Cedar Rapids, Iowa, United States, serving Eastern Iowa as an affiliate of ABC, MyNetworkTV, and The CW. Owned by Gray Media, the station maintains studios on Second Avenue Southeast in downtown Cedar Rapids; its transmitter is located near Walker, Iowa.

== History ==
During the late 1940s, the Cedar Rapids Gazette, then-owners of KCRG (1600 AM), filed an application with the Federal Communications Commission (FCC) for a TV station license. At the time, the FCC had a backlog of over 200 applications and had decided not to proceed with action on further applications until the backlogged requests could be filled.

After the backlog was cleared, many applications were filed for licenses. The Gazette Company did not want to compete for a license and decided to withdraw the initial application. Instead, it joined with a number of other investors as Cedar Rapids Television Company (CRTV), which was granted a license for channel 9. The station began broadcasting October 15, 1953.

Initially, the station was known as KCRI-TV because the other investors did not want the new television station so closely identified with the Gazette newspaper. The radio station also took the KCRI call sign because one of the television station's managers suggested that every mention of "KCRG" on-air was a promotion for the newspaper—one for which the Gazette would have to pay each time. After about a year of operation, the Gazette bought out its partners in CRTV and the station was renamed KCRG-TV in 1954.

From 1954 to 2015, the station remained under the ownership of Gazette Communications, which was renamed the SourceMedia Group in mid-2010. After the 1996 sale of WHO-TV in Des Moines, KCRG-TV was the only locally owned and operated television station left in Iowa. KCRG started broadcasting in high-definition television in January 2003. The station also had the first news helicopter in Iowa, "NewsCopter 9".

KCRG's broadcasts became digital-only, effective June 12, 2009. The station had attempted to convert on February 17, 2009, with the majority of other Cedar Rapids stations, but the FCC requested they maintain one analog commercial network signal for the market for the remaining four months. Upon KCRG-TV's digital transition completion in June 2009, the "KCRG-TV" callsign was legally transferred from the now-defunct analog channel 9 to the new digital channel 9, with the "KCRG-DT" callsign being permanently discontinued.

In September 2015, Atlanta-based Gray Television and Gazette Communications announced they had an agreement where Gray Television would buy KCRG-TV for $100 million, with the transfer taking place on October 1. The sale was completed on November 1.

KCRG became a sister to KWQC-TV in nearby Davenport after Gray purchased the NBC affiliate as a condition of its owner, Media General, merging with Nexstar Broadcasting Group (now Nexstar Media Group), parent of rival WHBF-TV. In 2019, Ottumwa station KYOU-TV came under common ownership with KCRG when Gray completed its merger with Raycom Media, acquiring the Fox/NBC-affiliated station outright from American Spirit Media.

On February 1, 2021, Gray announced it would purchase Quincy Media for $925 million. As Quincy owned the market's KWWL, Gray intended to divest that station and retain KCRG in order to satisfy FCC requirements. The sale was completed on August 2, with KWWL going to Allen Media Broadcasting and KCRG becoming a sister to KTIV in Sioux City and KTTC in Rochester, Minnesota, the latter of which serves the north-central portion of Iowa. The acquisition gives Gray stations in every market covering Iowa outside of Des Moines.

=== Subchannel history ===
As of June 15, 2008, KCRG launched a second digital subchannel called "KCRG 9.2", which originally aired a wheel schedule of local news, weather and features. The remainder of the screen had a news ticker, current weather conditions, rotating weather images and program listings. Over time, syndicated and locally produced programs were added, culminating in the addition of MyNetworkTV to the subchannels in October 2011, one month after KWKB dropped the service and became a sole CW affiliate. However, MyNetworkTV's programming runs as an overnight offering on 9.2, airing from 2 to 4 a.m., seven hours later than its usual prime time slot. Subchannel 9.2 is also used to air ABC network programming preempted on the main signal for breaking news coverage; a prime example was during the Great Iowa Flood of June 2008, when 9.2 carried ABC's coverage of the NBA Finals while 9.1 provided full coverage of the disaster.

The schedule of 9.2 prominently features live and taped local sports coverage, including regular season and state championship coverage of volleyball, wrestling, soccer, baseball, football, and basketball (the latter two sports are broadcast on Friday evenings). Also featured are coverage of the Dubuque Fighting Saints (USHL hockey), Cedar Rapids Kernels (Midwest League baseball), and University of Northern Iowa athletics. Ancillary sports programming includes the discussion show On Iowa Live and the Zach Johnson Foundation pro-am golf tournament.

In late August 2011, KCRG added a third subchannel, 9.3, branded "WXNow" and featuring local forecasts and looping conditions originated locally from station weather computers. On October 1, 2013, the WXNow loop was moved to an online-only streaming channel on the station's website and replaced on 9.3 by the lifestyle-oriented Live Well Network. With Live Well slated to discontinue programming in January 2015, subchannel 9.3 joined Antenna TV that month, taking over the network's Eastern Iowa affiliation from KWKB (subchannel 20.2).

At the start of March 2019, KCRG added two more subchannels on 9.4 and 9.5, carrying Heroes & Icons and Start TV respectively, as part of a multi-station deal with Gray and Weigel Broadcasting, which owns H&I and Start TV. The new subchannels were made possible with a multiplexer upgrade which also resulted in KCRG-DT2 being upgraded to an HD presentation.

On New Year's Day 2020, KCRG launched a new subchannel on channel 9.6 that is affiliated with Circle, a country music-related TV network that was launched the same day.

On August 2, 2021, Antenna TV left the Cedar Rapids market and was replaced by The CW on 9.3, taking the network's affiliation from KWWL-DT2. Also, Heroes & Icons was moved to KWWL-DT2 with Start TV and Circle leaving the Cedar Rapids market due to KCRG using up all available bandwidth within its multiplexer to allow broadcasting The CW and MyNetworkTV in HD. Start TV re-entered the Cedar Rapids market on KWKB-DT4 in November 2023.

== News operation ==
Currently, KCRG-TV broadcasts a total of 36 hours of local newscasts each week (with six hours each weekday and three hours each on Saturdays and Sundays). In addition to its main newsroom at its Cedar Rapids studios, the station also operates a satellite newsroom in Dubuque. It previously operated news bureaus in Iowa City and Waterloo.

KCRG-TV was one of three remaining broadcast television stations in the United States employing the "24 Hour News Source" format in one way or another as a slogan, which it began using in 1990. They ended up changing it in April 2022, along with their TV graphics.

Upon retirement, Meteorologist Denny Frary was the station's longest-running on-air personality, working for KCRG from 1974 until he retired November 17, 2006. Sports director John Campbell, who had been with the station since 1979, retired in 2012. News reporter Dave Franzman was with the station from September 11, 1978, until his retirement at the end of 2018, while Bruce Aune started anchoring at KCRG in 1986 until his retirement in March 2020.

KCRG's first use of a satellite to broadcast 'live' (local) news was December 31, 1982 when Sports Director John Campbell reported the Iowa Hawkeyes had defeated the Tennessee Volunteers 28–22 to win the Peach Bowl at Fulton County Stadium in Atlanta. Use of satellite 'air time' was reported to be $3,000.00 a minute.

On January 3, 2011, KCRG-TV expanded its weekday morning newscast by one half-hour, moving it to 4:30 a.m., creating a 2 1/2 hour block of news each weekday morning.

On January 21, 2012, KCRG-TV became the second station in the Cedar Rapids–Waterloo–Dubuque–Iowa City market to broadcast its newscasts in high definition. The switch to HD came with brand-new logo, graphics, news set and a new 113-inch (290 cm) interactive touch screen that will be used for weather and other interactive storytelling. It is the largest interactive touch screen of its kind in the United States and the third largest in the world.

On April 6, 2020, KCRG-TV began airing 4 p.m. newscasts, under the name First at Four.

In November 2022, KCRG's studio went under renovation for a new set, planned for early 2023. A temporary set was located inside of two small office rooms. Renovations continued until January 10, 2023, when the new studio had its official debut during the 4 p.m. newscast.

On September 11, 2023, KCRG-TV launched Everyday Iowa, a one-hour lifestyle show airing weekdays at 9 a.m. Hosted by Justin Roberts, Catherine Blades and Christina Jensen, the program features local businesses, events and lifestyle topics throughout Eastern Iowa.

=== Notable current and former on-air staff ===
- Paul Burmeister – sports reporter (1998–2001)
- Dick Fletcher – (1960s?–1970s?)
- Ashley Hinson – anchor
- Liz Mathis – anchor (1998–2007)
- Curt Menefee – sports reporter (1984–1988)
- Tom Pettit – news reporter (1950s)

== Subchannels ==
The station's signal is multiplexed:

Subchannels of KCRG-TV
Subchannel	Res.	Short name	Programming
9.1	720p	KCRGABC	ABC
9.2	720p	KCRGMyN	Independent with MyNetworkTV
9.3	720p	KCRGCW	The CW
