= KXGM (AM) =

Radio station in Waterloo, Iowa (1972–2009)

- Waterloo, Iowa; United States
- Frequency: 850 kHz
- Branding: The Spirit

Programming
- Format: Contemporary Christian music

Ownership
- Owner: Extreme Grace Media

History
- First air date: October 31, 1972
- Last air date: December 19, 2009
- Former call signs: KLEU (1972–1984); KQQI (1984–1985); KLEU (1985); KWOF (1985–2008); KXGM (2008–2011)
- Call sign meaning: Extreme Grace Media

Technical information
- Facility ID: 37446
- Class: D
- Power: 500 watts (daytime only)
- Transmitter coordinates: 42°28′56″N 92°16′16″W

KXGM (850 AM) was a radio station that served the Waterloo, Iowa, area. The not-for-profit station broadcast a simulcast of KXGM-FM's Christian contemporary music format during daytime hours only. KXGM was owned by Extreme Grace Media.

The station's antenna system used three towers arranged in a directional array that concentrated the signal toward the northwest. According to the Antenna Structure Registration database, each of the towers was 88.4 m (290 ft) tall. The transmitter site was located in east Waterloo on Osage Road.

== History ==
The station signed on October 31, 1972, as KLEU. On December 31, 1984, the station was assigned the callsign KQQI. Its callsign was changed back to KLEU on April 23, 1985. On July 18, 1985, the station's callsign was changed to KWOF.

In August 1985, the station was transferred from KLEU, Inc., to Michael Facciani Ministries, Inc.

In May 1990, the station was transferred from Melene Facciani to Debra B. Smith.

In April 1995, the station was transferred from Life Unlimited Communications, Inc., to Friendship Communications, Inc.

From 1997 until October 2006, the station aired a Christian Contemporary music format branded as "The Spirit" under the callsign KWOF. On October 20, 2006, the station flipped to a "legendary Christian rock" format featuring artists from the 1970s through the mid-1990s. The format was branded as "The Prodigal." This date also marked the end of simulcasting Christian Contemporary music programming from sister station KWOF-FM.

In March 2008, Extreme Grace Media (Chris Behmlander, president) reached an agreement to purchase KWOF and KWOF-FM from Friendship Communications (Michael Facciani, president) for a reported sale price of $160,000. The transfer was approved by the FCC on April 23, 2008, and the deal was consummated on July 18, 2008.

On August 8, 2008, the station's call letters were changed to KXGM (reflecting its new ownership) and began simulcasting KXGM-FM programming.

KXGM went silent December 19, 2009, following the sale of the station's transmitter site. The station did not return to the air within a year of going silent; its license was cancelled on July 28, 2011.
