= KWWL (TV) =

Television station in Waterloo, Iowa

- Waterloo–Cedar Rapids–; Dubuque–Iowa City, Iowa; United States
- City: Waterloo, Iowa
- Channels: Digital: 7 (VHF); Virtual: 7
- Branding: KWWL; News 7 KWWL; KWWL News; MeTV KWWL 7.3

Programming
- Affiliations: 7.1: NBC; for others, see § Subchannels

Ownership
- Owner: Allen Media Group; (Cedar-Rapids TV License Company, LLC)

History
- First air date: November 29, 1953
- Former call signs: KWWL-TV (1953–1983)
- Former channel numbers: Analog: 7 (VHF, 1953–2009); Digital: 55 (UHF, 2003–2009)
- Former affiliations: DuMont (secondary, 1953–1956); NTA (secondary, 1956–1961); The CW (7.2, 2016−2021)
- Call sign meaning: "Keep Watching Waterloo" (common, but inaccurate belief); -or-; "Waterloo Way Leads"

Technical information
- Licensing authority: FCC
- Facility ID: 593
- ERP: 49 kW
- HAAT: 601 m (1,972 ft)
- Transmitter coordinates: 42°24′2″N 91°50′37″W

Links
- Public license information: Public file; LMS
- Website: kwwl.com

KWWL (channel 7) is a television station licensed to Waterloo, Iowa, United States, serving as the NBC affiliate for Eastern Iowa. Owned by Allen Media Group, KWWL maintains studios on East 5th Street in Waterloo, with news bureaus and advertising sales offices in Cedar Rapids, Dubuque and Iowa City. The station's transmitter is located north of Rowley, Iowa, a city in Buchanan County.

== History ==
When the Federal Communications Commission (FCC) opened up bids for channel 7 in Waterloo, it was obvious that the license would either go to Sonderling Broadcasting, owner of KXEL (1540 AM), or R.J. McElroy and his Black Hawk Broadcasting Company, owner of KWWL (1330 AM, now KPTY). After a long legal battle, Black Hawk won the license, and KWWL-TV signed on for the first time on November 26, 1953.

The station was originally affiliated with NBC and the DuMont network. During the late 1950s, the station was also briefly affiliated with the NTA Film Network.

In 1980, Black Hawk agreed in principle to merge with Forward Communications. However, the FCC told Black Hawk and Forward that the combined company would have to sell either the radio stations–KWWL radio and KFMW–or channel 7. The KWWL stations had been grandfathered under a 1970s FCC rule banning common ownership of radio and television stations. When Forward decided to keep the radio stations, Black Hawk sold channel 7, along with then-sister station KTIV in Sioux City, to AFLAC just before the merger closed. In 1997, AFLAC sold its entire broadcasting division, including KWWL, to Raycom Media.

In 2006, Raycom sold KWWL and a handful of other stations following its purchase of the Liberty Corporation in late 2005. Quincy Newspapers became owner of KWWL on July 1, 2006. The merger made QNI the owner of four of the NBC affiliates serving Iowa, along with flagship station WGEM-TV in Quincy, Illinois, KTTC in Rochester, Minnesota, and Black Hawk/AFLAC sibling KTIV, which had been sold to QNI in 1989.

KWWL shut down its analog signal, over VHF channel 7, on February 17, 2009, the original target date on which full-power television stations in the United States were to transition from analog to digital broadcasts under federal mandate (which was later pushed back to June 12, 2009). The station's digital signal relocated from its pre-transition UHF channel 55, which was among the high band UHF channels (52-69) that were removed from broadcasting use as a result of the transition, to VHF channel 7. The "KWWL" callsign was legally transferred from the now-defunct analog channel 7 to the new digital channel 7, with the "KWWL-DT" callsign being permanently discontinued.

On November 1, 2010, the FCC granted KWWL a construction permit for a 300-watt digital fill-in translator on channel 7 (the same frequency as their main channel). The translator would serve the immediate part and areas northwest of Dubuque. The permit was later canceled on June 6, 2013.

On January 7, 2021, Quincy Media announced that it had put itself up for sale. A few weeks later, Gray Television announced its intent to purchase Quincy for $925 million. As Gray already owns the market's KCRG-TV and both stations rank among the top four in ratings in the Cedar Rapids–Waterloo market, it intended to keep KCRG-TV and divest KWWL in order to satisfy FCC requirements. On April 29, 2021, it was announced that Allen Media Group would acquire KWWL and the remaining Quincy stations not being acquired by Gray Television for $380 million. The sale was completed on August 2 the same year, making KWWL a sister station to CBS affiliate KIMT in nearby Mason City. Gray's decision to sell KWWL came as an ironic twist, given that they had acquired the station's previous owner Raycom in 2019.

On June 1, 2025, amid financial woes and rising debt, Allen Media Group announced that it would explore "strategic options" for the company, such as a sale of its television stations (including KWWL).

=== Studio renovation ===
In late 2014, the KWWL building underwent a major renovation project, which involved extensive interior and exterior work. The neighboring American Legion building was demolished to make way for a new parking lot. This also led to the building's "front" changing from the 4th Street side to the 5th Street side. Further exterior work restored the 4th Street side to how it appeared when the building was first constructed in the early 1900s. This included restoring original trim and detail work, as well as the large windows which surrounded half the building. On the interior, the newsroom and studio were relocated to the newly renovated and updated second floor. The new KWWL set debuted on October 26, 2016. A week later, demolition and remodeling of the first floor began. In July 2017, the remainder of KWWL's departments (Marketing, Sales and Administration) moved to their new location on the first floor. The full renovation of the studio building was completed on September 20, 2017.

== KWWL-DT2 ==
KWWL-DT2 is the Heroes & Icons-affiliated second digital subchannel of KWWL, broadcasting in 480i standard definition on channel 7.2.

=== History ===
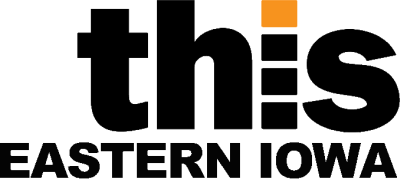
KWWL-DT2's previous logo as a This TV affiliate.

KWWL-DT2 began operations in November 2004 as an affiliate of NBC Weather Plus, airing national weather forecasts from the service as well as inserts of local weather forecasts from the KWWL weather center. However, on October 7, 2008, NBC Universal announced that they would shut down the NBC Weather Plus service by December 31, 2008, concurrently, in January 2009, that subchannel began airing This TV programming.

KWWL-DT2's logo as a CW affiliate; used from 2016 until 2021.

In April 2016, KWWL announced that they would add programming from The CW on KWWL-DT2 beginning on September 12, 2016. At the same time, KWWL-DT2 ended its seven-year affiliation with This TV. This resulted in an affiliation swap between KWWL-DT2 and Iowa City-based KWKB (channel 20), the Cedar Rapids market's former CW affiliate, which then became the This TV affiliate for the Cedar Rapids market.

On August 2, 2021, The CW moved to KCRG-DT3, replacing Antenna TV, and KWWL ended up replacing The CW with Heroes & Icons, which moved from KCRG-DT4.

== News operation ==
On April 11, 2010, KWWL became the first station in eastern Iowa and the first QNI station to broadcast its newscasts in high definition. At this time, it updated its logo, removing the large blue circle that surrounded the 7.

On January 17, 2025, Allen Media Group announced plans to cut local meteorologist/weather forecaster positions from its stations, including KWWL, and replace them with a "weather hub" produced by The Weather Channel, which AMG also owns. The decision was reversed within a week by management in response to "viewer and advertiser reaction".

=== Notable former on-air staff ===
- Paul Burmeister – sports anchor/reporter
- Bob Hogue – 1979–1984, sports director, play-by-play announcer for Iowa Television Network
- Liz Mathis – 1980–1996, anchor
- Ron Steele – 1974–2025, anchor
- Mark Steines
- Irv Weinstein – 90 days in the early 1950s as a director; he was fired and eventually returned to his native Western New York as an anchor for WKBW-TV

== Subchannels ==
The station's signal is multiplexed:

Subchannels of KWWL
Channel	Res.	Short name	Programming
7.1	1080i	KWWLNBC	NBC
7.2	480i	KWWLH&I	Heroes & Icons
7.3	480i	KWWLME	MeTV
7.4	480i	CourtTV	Court TV
7.5	480i	TruCrim	True Crime Network
7.6	480i	MeToons	MeTV Toons
