= Veterans Memorial Building =

Veterans Memorial Building may refer to:

- Veterans Memorial Building (Santa Cruz, California), listed on the National Register of Historic Places in Santa Cruz County, California
- Veterans Memorial Building (Cedar Rapids, Iowa), is a contributing property in the May's Island Historic District, listed on the National Register of Historic Places in Linn County, Iowa
- UAW-Ford National Programs Center, Detroit, Michigan, a building that may possibly also be known as Veterans Memorial Building
- Veterans Memorial Building (American Fork, Utah), listed on the National Register of Historic Places in Utah County, Utah
