= Linn County Courthouse (Iowa) =

- U.S. Historic district – Contributing property
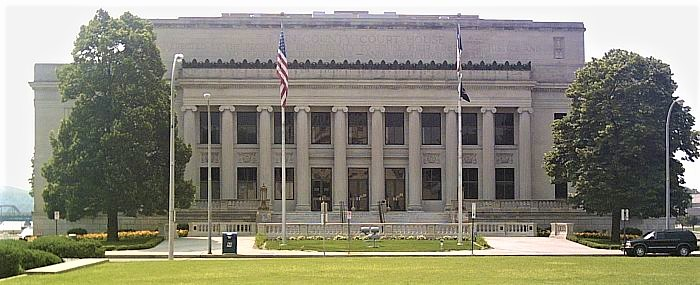

- Location within Iowa Location within the United States
- Interactive map showing the location of Linn County Courthouse
- Location: May’s Island; Cedar Rapids, Iowa
- Coordinates: 41°58′30.1″N 91°40′10.7″W
- Built: 1923-1925
- Architect: Joseph Royer
- Architectural style: Beaux-Arts
- Part of: May's Island Historic District (ID78001240)
- Added to NRHP: October 19, 1978

The Linn County Courthouse is located on May's Island in the middle of the Cedar River in Cedar Rapids, Iowa, United States. It, along with the Veterans Memorial Building and two other buildings, is a contributing property to the May's Island Historic District that was listed on the National Register of Historic Places in 1978. The courthouse is the third building the county has used for court functions and county administration.

== History ==
The county's first courthouse was built for $40,000 in 1842 in Marion. The building was two stories tall and constructed of brick. As Cedar Rapids vied for Marion to be the county seat a second courthouse was built in Marion in 1855. Cedar Rapids deeded a plot of land to the county for a courthouse in 1919. Even though voters failed to support a $1.3 million bond referendum to build the courthouse the board of supervisors continued to plan for a new building. In 1922 voters passed a smaller bond referendum.

The present courthouse was designed by Urbana, Illinois architect Joseph Royer in the Beaux-Arts style. It was completed in 1925 for just under $500,000. Royer also designed the former county jail that sat behind the courthouse.

The building sustained significant damage from a flood in 2008. Renovations of the building were completed in 2014.

== Architecture ==
The Linn County Courthouse is a three-story Bedford stone structure built on a granite foundation. The building consists of a main block flanked by two short wings. Classical elements are found in the full entablature and the protruding, nine-bay entrance porch. Ten fluted columns in the Ionic order support the entablature and parapet. Decorative stone panels separate two floors of windows. A stone balustrade surrounds the terrace, and balconies on the first floor windows flank the entrance pavilion. The side elevations and the rear of the building provide a simpler appearance, but the cornice surrounds most of the building. The interior walls were built of travertine and marble covers the floors.
