= Cedar Rapids Public Library =

Library system in Iowa (USA)

Coordinates: 41.952833°N 91.718248°W

The Cedar Rapids Public Library (CRPL) serves the city of Cedar Rapids, Iowa. It consists of two locations: the Downtown Library, located at 450 5th Avenue SE, and the Busse Branch, located at 1845 Sandberg Lane SW. The CRPL works in cooperation with the Marion Public Library and Hiawatha Public Library to form the Metro Library Network, which allows them to share a collection of materials, partner on programs, and make resources more available to all citizens.

The Iowa flood of 2008, considered by the Federal Emergency Management Agency (FEMA) to be "one of the worst and most costly floods in Iowa--and even U.S. history," destroyed the building at the previous downtown location of the main branch, along with over half of the library's collection. The flooding of the library may have been the worst natural disaster to affect a public library. The new Cedar Rapids Public Library opened to the public on August 24, 2013. More than 8,000 people attended opening day festivities. In the first year of service, the new library saw over 660,000 visits from the community, and over 100,000 people used the meeting room spaces, including the new 200-seat Whipple Auditorium.

== History ==
On March 2, 1896 the city of Cedar Rapids was to make a vote on whether or not they would have a public library. Due largely to the work of a group of women called the City Federation of Ladies Literary Clubs led by Ada Van Vechten, the vote was favorable. On January 15, 1897, the first public library was to open its doors to the citizens of Cedar Rapids. It was located in a small room of the Granby building.

After a few years, the library had outgrown the room. It was moved to the Dows auditorium in May 1900. Andrew Carnegie was contacted in late January 1901 to request money to construct a dedicated library building. He agreed to give $75,000 if the town would pledge $7,500 in taxation annually to support the maintenance. In early 1903, the library chose Ely corner at Third Avenue and Fifth Street as the future site of the Carnegie library. In 1904, Jacob William Hopp was the general superintendent for the construction. On June 23, 1905, the new library was open.

The years to follow were filled with a variety of strategies to expand services within the town and beyond. In 1910, E. Joanna Hagey became the librarian. She was the driving force behind the extension work for nearly three decades. Books were brought to schools, drug stores, and workplaces for extra convenience. Surrounding townships had contracted for library services. By 1928, six library stations were in operation. In 1930 there was a new Kenwood Park station, the first branch building owned by the library.

During the Great Depression, circulation had reached record highs for the library. Beginning in 1933, the circulation began to fall as it had for other libraries across the nation. Everything started to normalize towards the end of the '30s. In 1940 there were 15 people staffing the library. The head librarian, who had replaced Hagey at the end of 1939, was Miss Alice Story. Another librarian that would later have a lasting effect on the library and the community, Evelyn Zerzanek, worked under Miss Story as the head librarian of the school and the children's department.

Evelyn Zerzanek worked hard to not only get books into children's hands, but also to think for themselves and be creative. Under her direction, the summer reading programs and story times had increased in popularity. Evelyn also loved children's book illustrations. She started a collection that would grow to over 850 original paintings and drawings.

In the early 1950s, two bookmobiles were purchased that had replaced all of the stations. Together they would make twelve stops each week at regular locations. Instead of many rented stations, the library now consisted of the two bookmobiles, the Kenwood Park station, and the main building.

Crowding became a pressing issue for the library throughout the '60s. Much of the material had to be stored in the basement. New materials had to be turned away due to the space restrictions. In 1969, the library proposed to expand the current building and to establish a west-side branch. It failed to reach 60% voter approval. In 1971, a branch was established on Edgewood Road NW. The first two of three bookmobiles were retired by 1972.

For the next twelve years, the library would be unsuccessful at securing a majority vote. The library had changed its proposal from remodeling the library to constructing a new facility during that time. In 1981, the Hall Foundation offered over 25% of the $7.9 million bond issue if the city would pay the remainder, but again, the 60% voter approval would not be met. About four months later, the Hall Foundation of Cedar Rapids offered to pay $6.8 million over the next ten years on the condition that the Library Foundation, established in 1972, could obtain $1 million in private donations. By the end of September, $1.3 million in private contributions had secured the amount necessary to move forward with the plans for a new library.

The new library at 500 First Street SE opened on February 17, 1985. The floor space of the new building was 83,000 square feet compared with 29,000 square feet in the Carnegie building. Space issues were not the reason for moving as they had been in the past. The flood of 2008 had taken out much of the adult and reference collections. The children's books on the upper level, along with the Zerzanek collection, were all saved.

The library would lease space at the Westdale Mall where they had already established a library branch in August 1988. The branch material would be consolidated with the library's surviving collection in the former Osco Drug Store space. In February 2013, the Ladd Library was opened, establishing a permanent west-side location. On May 5, 2012, construction began on the new downtown location, which opened to the public in August 2013.

The Ladd Library closed permanently on August 9, 2026 to be replaced the Busse Branch, by a permanent location one block away. The Busse Branch is a 40,000 square foot library featuring a larger collection space with a children's library and program room, a young adult section, and much more meeting space. The Busse Branch opened to the public on Saturday, September 19, 2026.

== Services ==
The CRPL offers an abundance of regular services, including free public computers and wifi access, meeting rooms, and a vast collection of materials. They offer a variety of programs including the Summer Reading Program, story times, and Maker Space programs. There are a number of databases and other materials, such as e-books, downloadable audiobooks, and downloadable music, that can be accessed either at the library or remotely with a library card. Other events include author talks, live music, and art exhibits by local area artists.

With the passing of the FY2017 Budget on January 7, 2016, voted on by the Cedar Rapids Public Library Board of Trustees, the library was subjected to budget costs totaling approximately $461,000. These cuts resulted in a reduction of library services, including operating hours. Beginning March 27, 2016, both the Downtown and Ladd locations were open Monday-Thursday, 9 am-8 pm and Fridays 9 am-5 pm. The Downtown Library will also be open on Saturday, 9 am-5 pm but closed on Sunday, while the Ladd location was closed on Saturday and open Sunday, 1-5 pm. The City Council restored funding to the library in the 2018 budget to ensure full restoration of library hours.

In 2020, a significant gift was left to the Cedar Rapids Public Library Foundation by Nadine Sandberg. This gift started the process of establishing a permanent location to replace the Ladd Library, which was in a leased space. The Foundation began the Inspiring Big Dreams Campaign and raised more than $10 million for the project. That, combined with $6 million in ARPA funding from the City of Cedar Rapids and $4 million in ARPA funding from Linn County, made the Busse Branch possible.

Cedar Rapids Public Library Busse Branch is located at 1845 Sandberg Lane. Sandberg Lane, a new road, just off 20th Avenue and Edgewood Road SW, is named for Nadine Sandberg, whose $2 million estate gift to the Library Foundation in 2020 was used to purchase the land for the new library.

A 40,000 square foot facility, the Busse Branch transformed library service on the city's west side, including a dedicated children’s library complete with a programming room, 11 study rooms, increased meeting space, and a larger collection of books and materials.

The biophilic design of the space creates an indoor-outdoor feel, and two courtyards with seating give direct access inside. The north facade of glass offers spectacular views of the new Allsop Park, set to be completed by the city in phases. Additional features include a drive-up book return and a holds pickup window, as well as a dedicated young adult library, and expanded technology space. Outside the library, the Bloomhall Discovery Garden features an outdoor “reading room,” outdoor classroom, discovery nooks, and native plantings. https://www.crlibrary.org/news/public-invited-grand-opening-cedar-rapids-public-library-busse-branch
