= CRST =

American freight company

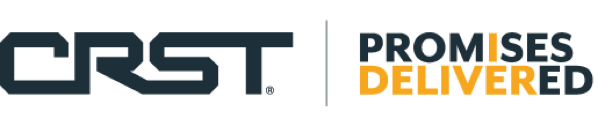

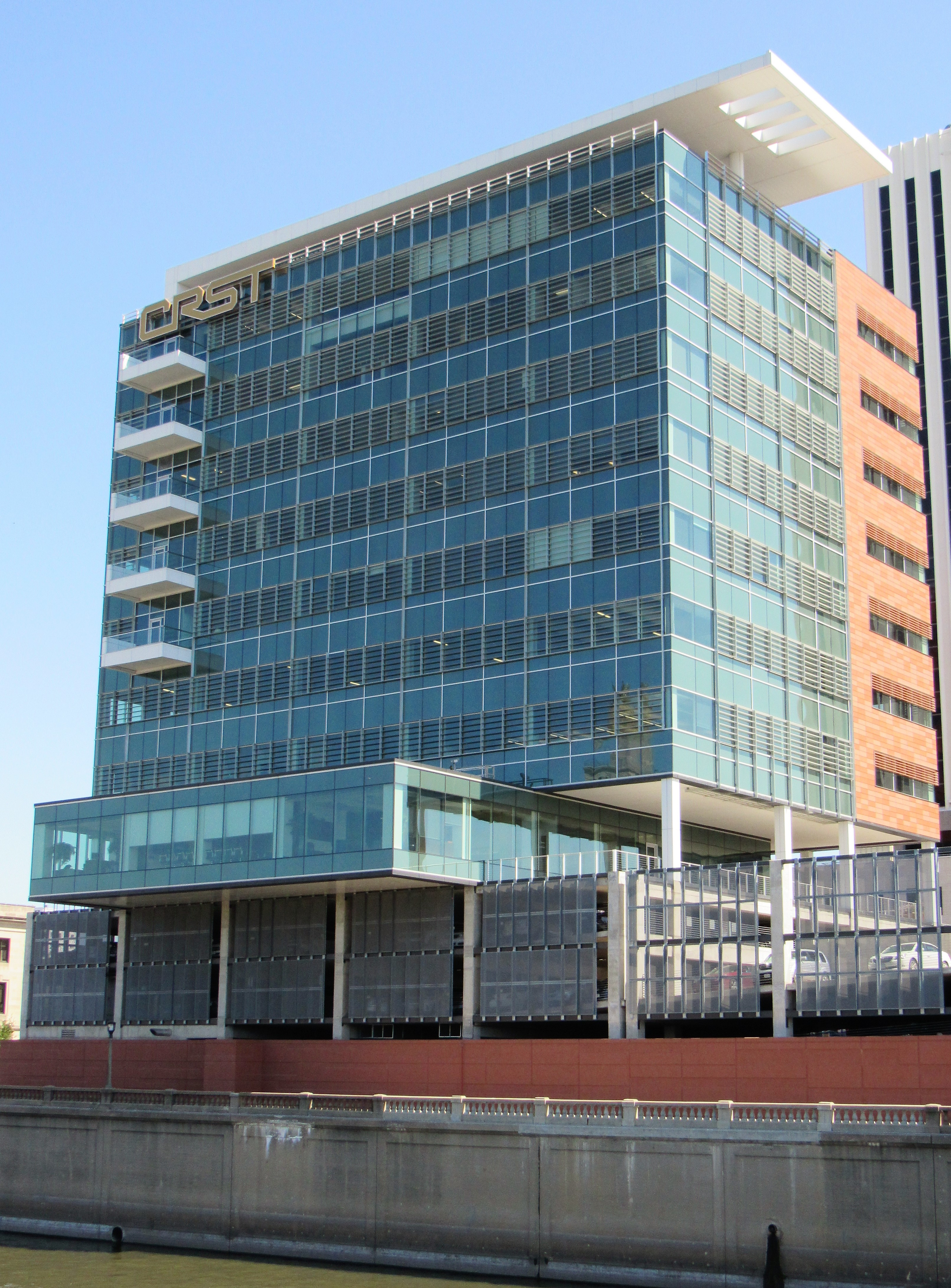
- CRST headquarters, CRST Center
- Formerly: Cedar Rapids Steel Transport
- Type: Private
- Industry: Transportation
- Founded: 1955; 71 years ago
- Founders: Herald and Miriam Smith
- Headquarters: Cedar Rapids, Iowa, U.S.
- Key people: Mike Gannon, CRST President & CEO (August 2024 – present); Hugh Ekberg, former CRST President & CEO (September 2018 – August 2024)
- Website: www.crst.com

CRST The Transportation Solution, Inc. (formerly CRST International) is an American freight company based in Cedar Rapids, Iowa.

Founded as Cedar Rapids Steel Transport in 1955 by Herald and Miriam Smith, it is a privately held company with a current fleet of more than 30,000 transportation service providers, 6,000 drivers, and annual revenues of $1.5 billion.

== History ==
CRST was founded as Cedar Rapids Steel Transport in 1955 by Herald "Smitty" and Miriam Smith. They bought a chicken coop for $125 and with no trucks or customers, started their company. Herald saw his opportunity when he noticed truck drivers hauling livestock to Chicago and returning empty. He convinced Chicago firms he could save them money by loading those empty trucks with steel on their return to Cedar Rapids, hence the name of the company. Smith later purchased his own trucks, and expanded beyond the Chicago to Cedar Rapids route. By 1963, CRST had reached $1 million in revenue.

Herald's son, John Smith, took over as president in 1983. Under John's leadership, CRST began acquiring niche carriers. The most notable was the acquisition of Malone Freight Lines, Inc. of Trussville, Alabama, which allowed CRST to expand its territory into the Southeast of the United States. In 1997, revenues were $300 million and John bought out the rest of his family's holdings in CRST.

In 2010, David Rusch became president and CEO of the company, with John Smith becoming chairman of the board.

In 2014, CRST began building its company headquarters in Cedar Rapids, Iowa. In the same year, it began a program called "Gold Rules" to shift the corporate culture to focus on the drivers' needs. Founder Herald Smith died in 2015.

On December 31, 2022, CRST closed its Cedar Rapids-based North American Driver Training Academy (NADTA) facility after the last group of trainees completed the program.

CRST consolidated into four business units: Capacity Solutions, Dedicated Solutions, Home Solutions, and Specialized Solutions.

== Acquisitions ==
CRST entered a phase of mergers and acquisitions in the 2010s. It acquired Specialized Transportation Inc. of Fort Wayne, Indiana in 2011. It later purchased the Special Products Division of Allied Van Lines in 2013. That same year, CRST acquired BESL Transfer Co. of Cincinnati, Ohio, which specializes in flatbed transportation. In 2015, CRST purchased Pegasus Transportation which is a high security, temperature-controlled freight company of Louisville, KY. In 2016, CRST acquired Gardner Trucking out of Ontario, California.

In March 2020, CRST acquired NAL Group, a logistics company out of New Jersey. In November 2023, CRST acquired BCB Transport, a truckload carrier based in Texas.

== Lawsuits ==
In 2011, the company lost a sexual harassment lawsuit in California's San Bernardino County Superior Court and was ordered to pay $1.5 million to the defendant, who stated she was sexually harassed by her managing driver. An appeal by the company was denied in 2015.

Another lawsuit, involving 67 plaintiffs who sued the company over sexual abuse and harassment beginning in 1999, began in 2007 and was lost for failing to meet pre-suit obligations. The lawsuit was re-filed with three plaintiffs in 2015. CRST took the case to the US Supreme Court to claim reimbursement of legal fees by the United States Equal Employment Opportunity Commission (EEOC) due to their failure to investigate many of the cases brought against CRST. The EEOC claimed they did not owe CRST these fees; however, following the Supreme Court's decision in CRST's favor, the matter was remanded to the Eighth Circuit Court of Appeals and back to the United States District Court for the Northern District of Iowa for further proceedings. In December 2017, the District Court ordered the EEOC to pay CRST $3.3 million in attorney fees. The EEOC appealed this order to the Eighth Circuit, which affirmed the fee award to CRST, paid by EEOC in 2020.

In 2016, a group of CRST drivers sued the company with claims that they were not paid a minimum wage for the number of hours worked due to the fact that CRST did not pay drivers while they were in the sleeper berth. In December 2023, a federal court ruled that drivers must be paid while in the sleeper berth over eight hours.

== Awards ==
Year	Award	Ref.
2023	CRST was named Carrier of the Year by The Home Depot.	
2023	CRST Driver Ondrae Meyers won 2nd place in the 2023 Transition Trucking Award.	
2023	CRST driver Brian Sheehan won American Trucking Associations’ America’s Road Team Captain.	
2024	CRST received the EPA’s 2024 SmartWay Excellence Award.	
2024	CRST won the 2024 IMTA Image Award.	
2024	CRST was named Carrier of the Year by The Home Depot.	
2024	CRST was named 2024 Carrier of the Year by C.H. Robinson	
