= Cedar Rapids, Iowa =

- City
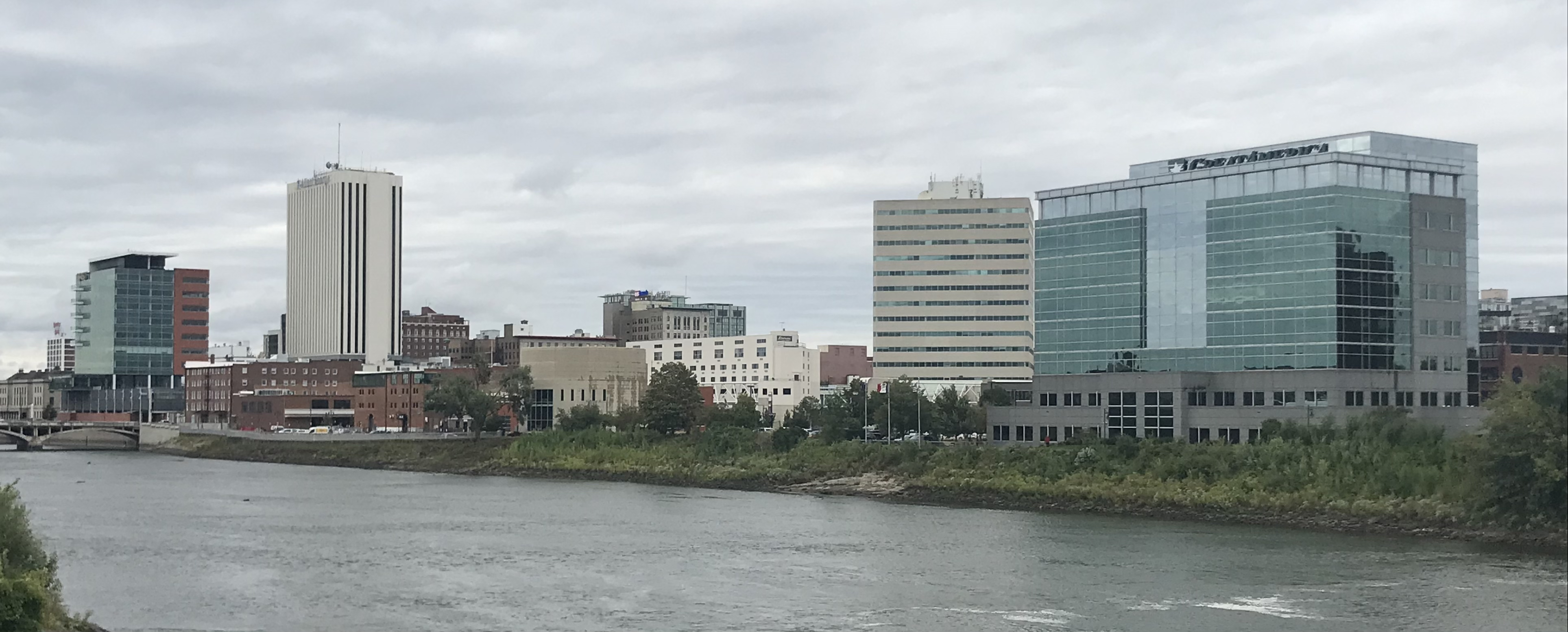
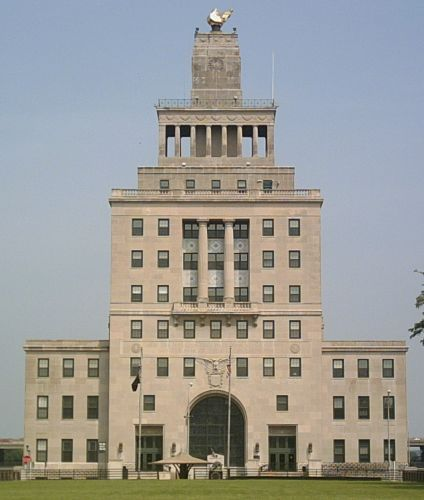
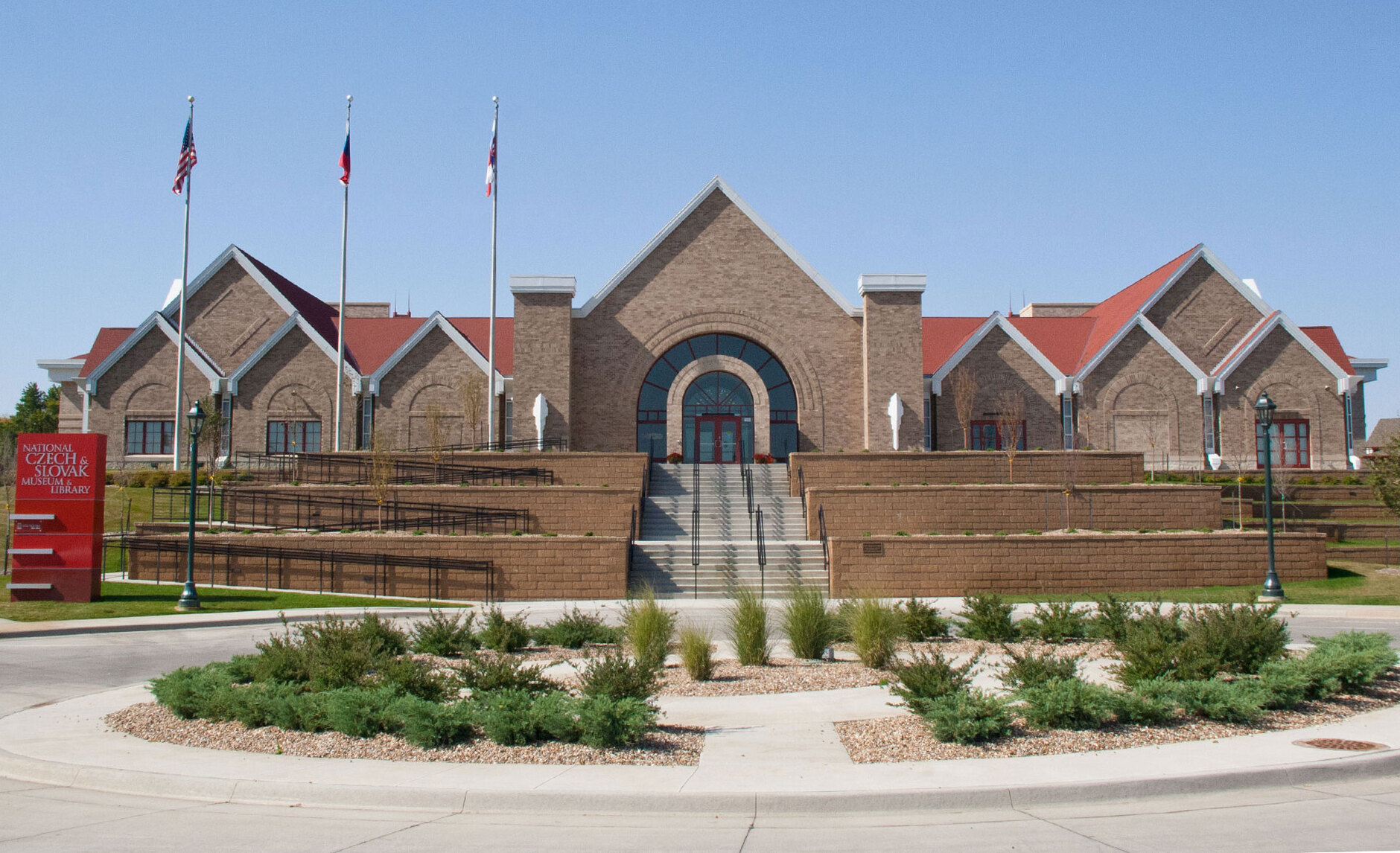
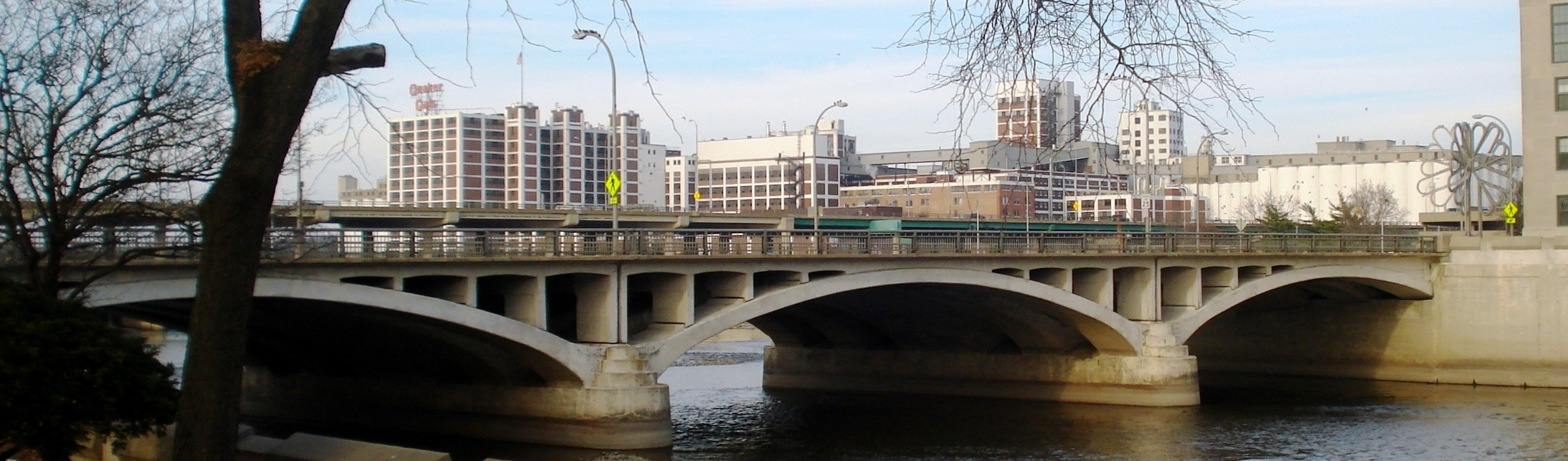
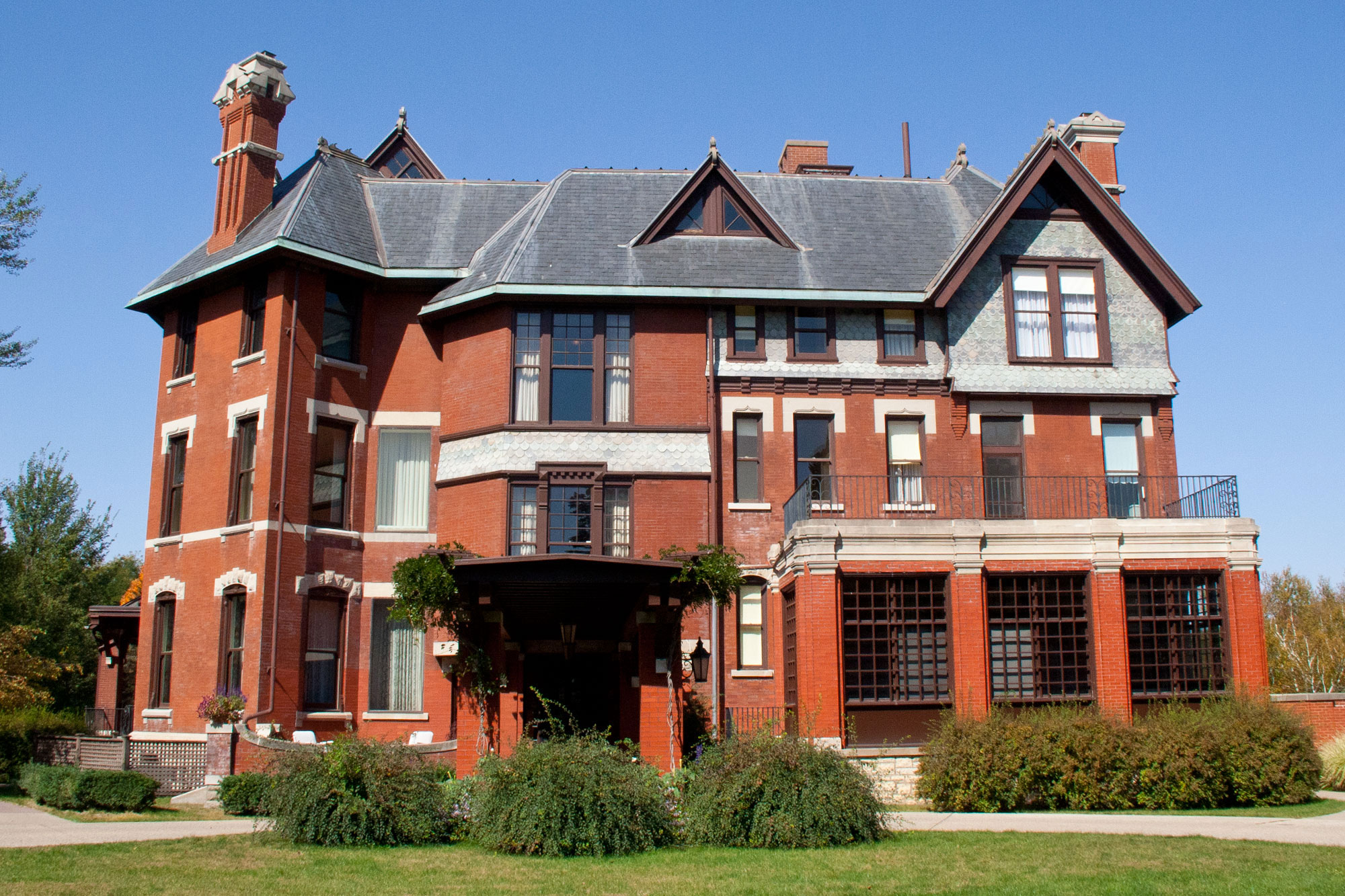
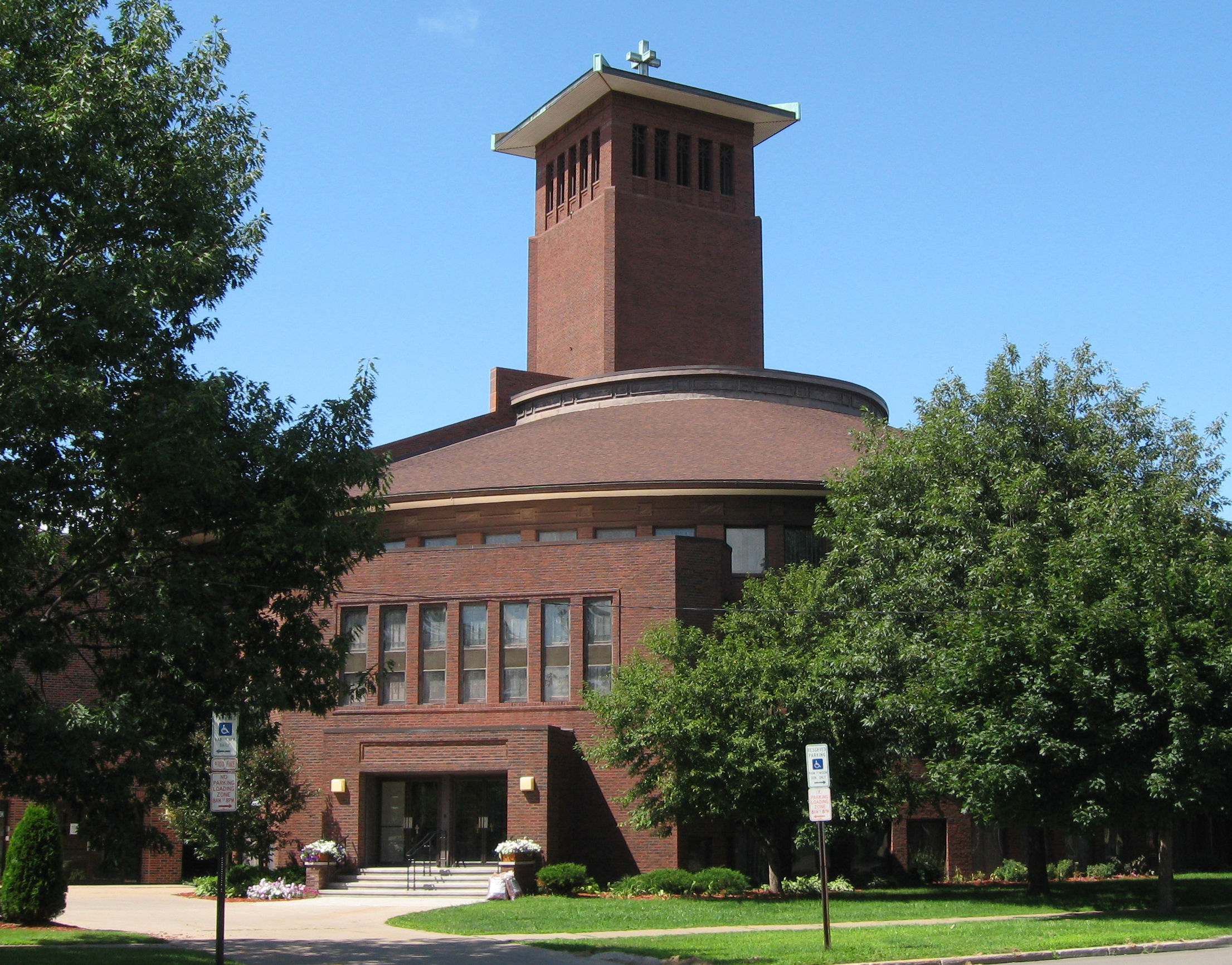
- Cedar Rapids skyline and Cedar River Veterans Memorial Building National Czech & Slovak Museum & Library First Avenue Bridge and Quaker Oats Plant Brucemore St. Paul's United Methodist Church

- Flag Logo
- Nicknames: City of Five Seasons
- Interactive map of Cedar Rapids, Iowa
- Location within Iowa Location within the United States
- Coordinates: 41.96419°N 91.67917°W
- Country: United States
- State: Iowa
- County: Linn
- Settled: Late-1830's
- Platted: 1838
- Surveyed: 1841
- Incorporated: January 15, 1849

Government
  - Type: Mayor–Council
  - Mayor: Tiffany O'Donnell (R)
  - City manager: Jeff Pomeranz
  - At-large: Tyler Olson
  - Representatives: District 1: Martin Hoeger; District 2: Scott Overland; District 3: Dale Todd; District 4: Scott Olson; District 5: Ashley Vanorny

Area
  - City: 76.037 sq mi (196.935 km^{2})
  - Land: 74.787 sq mi (193.697 km^{2})
  - Water: 1.250 sq mi (3.238 km^{2}) 1.64%
- Elevation: 810 ft (247 m)

Population (2020)
  - City: 137,710
  - Estimate (2025): 137,935
  - Rank: US: 211th IA: 2nd
  - Density: 1,841.4/sq mi (710.96/km^{2})
  - Urban: 192,844 (US: 198th)
  - Urban density: 2,242/sq mi (865.5/km^{2})
  - Metro: 278,677 (US: 182nd)
  - Metro density: 138.7/sq mi (53.56/km^{2})
  - Combined: 461,388 (US: 92nd)
  - Combined density: 144.6/sq mi (55.83/km^{2})
- Time zone: UTC−6 (Central (CST))
  - Summer (DST): UTC−5 (CDT)
- ZIP Codes: 52401–52411, 52497–52499
- Area code: 319
- FIPS code: 19-12000
- GNIS feature ID: 467567
- Website: cedar-rapids.org

Cedar Rapids is a city in Linn County, Iowa, United States, and the county seat. The population was 137,710 at the 2020 census, and was estimated at 137,935 in 2025. making it the second-most populous city in Iowa. The city lies on both banks of the Cedar River, 20 miles (32 km) north of Iowa City and 128 miles (206 km) northeast of Des Moines, the state's capital.

Cedar Rapids is the economic hub of Eastern Iowa, located at the core of the Interstate 380 corridor. The population of the three-county Cedar Rapids metropolitan area, which includes the nearby cities of Marion and Hiawatha, was 276,520 in 2020. The Cedar Rapids metropolitan area is also part of a combined statistical area with the Iowa City metropolitan area.

== History ==
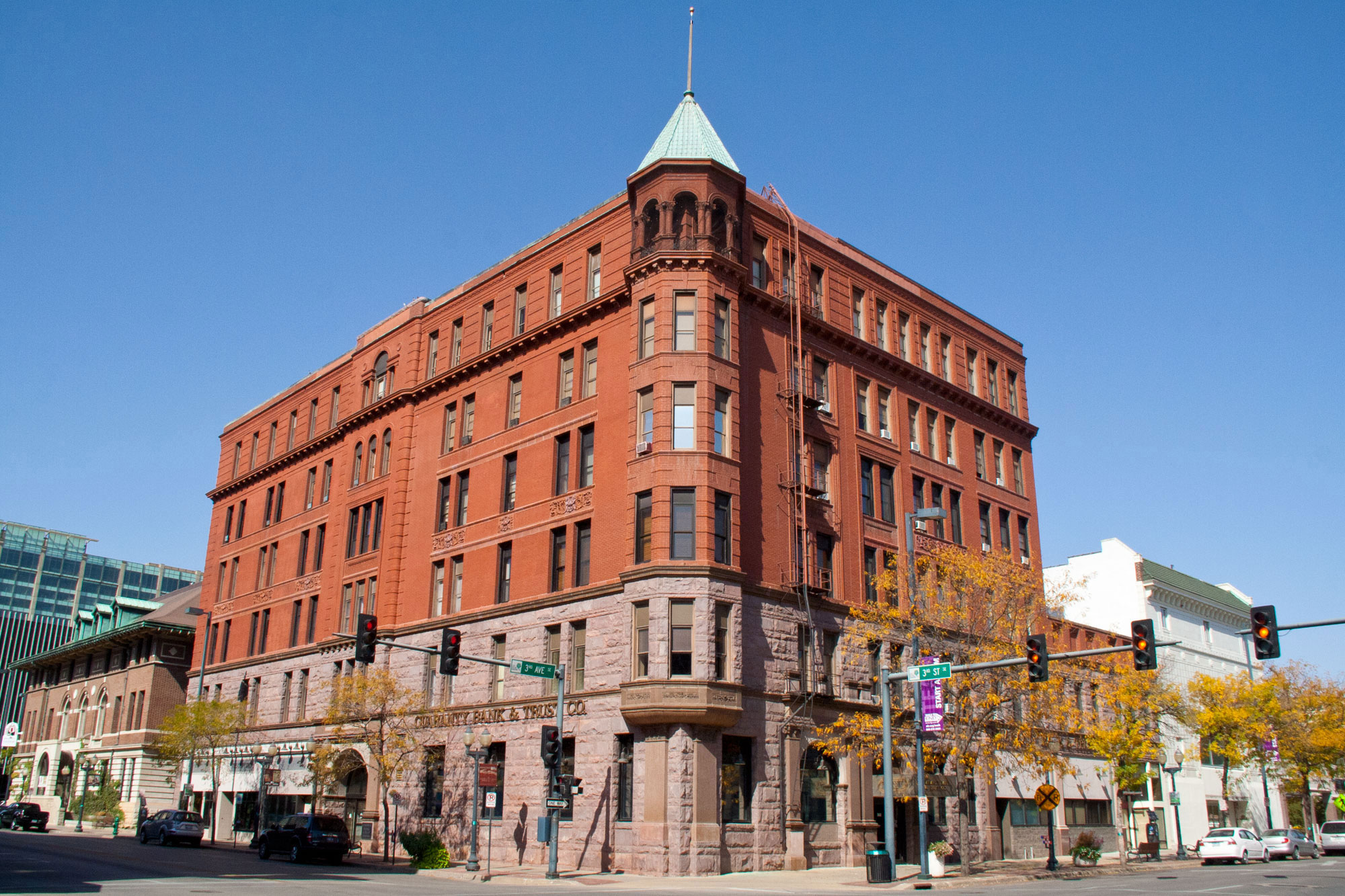
Cedar Rapids Central Business District Commercial Historic District

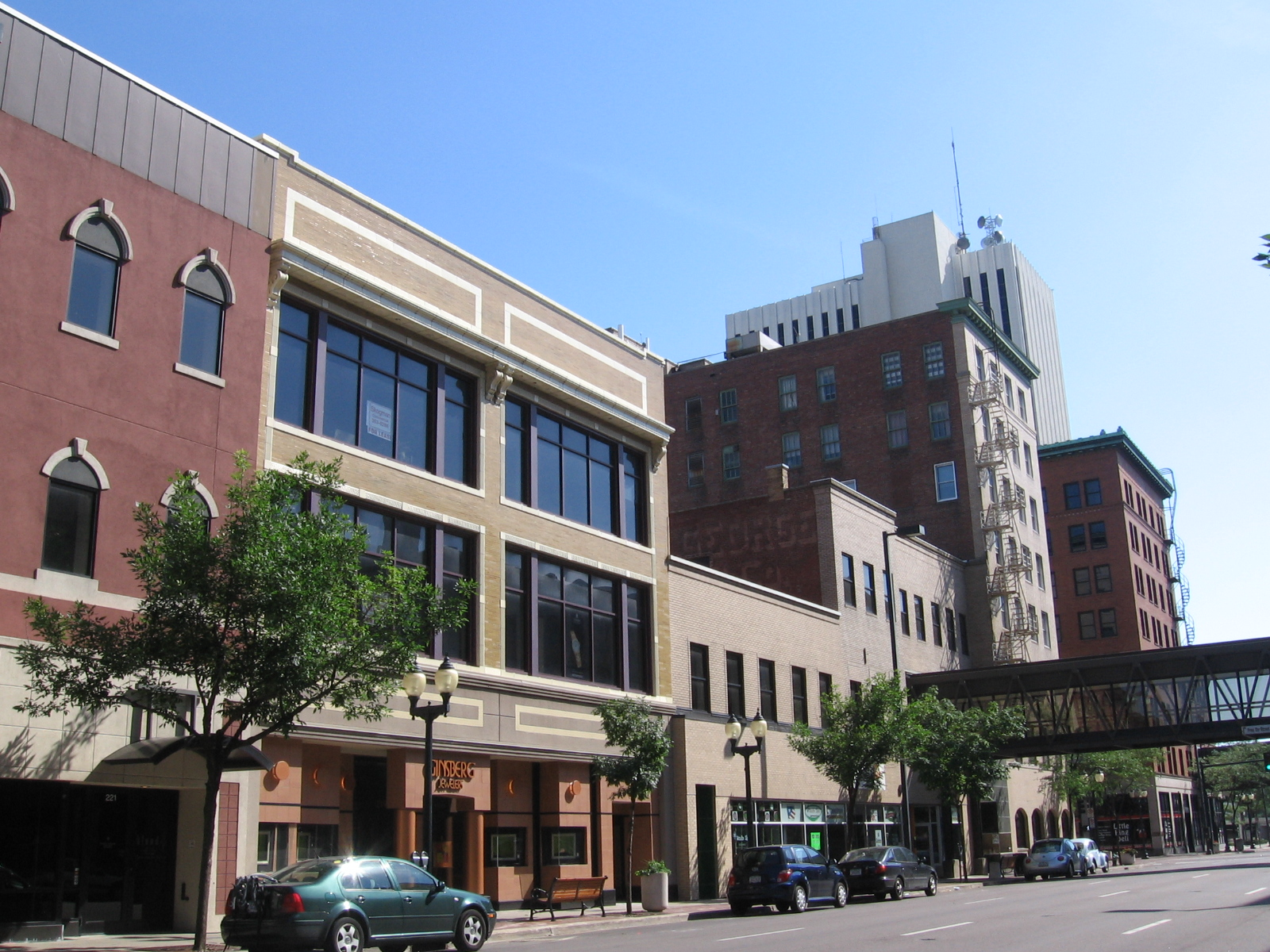
Second Avenue SE in downtown Cedar Rapids, looking towards the Cedar River

=== Early history ===
The location of present-day Cedar Rapids was in the territory of the Meskwaki and Sauk peoples at the time of European American settlement.

The first settler on the site of the future city was Osgood Shepherd, who built a log cabin (which he called a tavern) in 1837 or 1838 next to the Cedar River (then known as the Red Cedar) at what is now the corner of First Avenue and First Street Northeast. Shepherd was a squatter who claimed the land without legal title and also a reputed ne'er-do-well, who, if he was not a horse thief himself, definitely consorted with them. Early on, it appears that he "jumped the claim" of another squatter, Wilbert Stone, who had built a cabin and platted out a town, some distance south of Shepherd's cabin, that he called Columbus. Shepherd drove Stone across the river, claiming that Stone had built his cabin on Shepherd's land, then sold Stone's cabin to a buyer named Hull. Shepherd later tried the same tactic with perhaps the first settler on the west side of the river, Robert Ellis, but Ellis happened to be chopping wood at the time and warned that someone would be dead if Shepherd did not retreat.

The true founders of the city were George Greene, Nicholas Brown, and a few others. Brown had experience as a miller and Greene had surveyed much of eastern Iowa, so both saw the value of the spot Shepherd had claimed. It was right next to the rapids—a prime spot to build a mill—the last set of rapids on the river before the Cedar fed into the Iowa River, meaning that goods milled on the spot could be carried by boat down river to the Mississippi. In 1841, they formed a partnership that bought out Shepherd's claim and platted out a town they called Rapids City. Brown immediately constructed a primitive dam and then built the town's first mill. His crude dam soon washed away, prompting Greene to induce Alexander Ely, an engineer from Michigan, to build a proper dam that created a mill race capable of powering several mills.

At this time, the city was confined to the east side of the river. The west bank soon contained a village named Kingston for resident David King who early on operated a rope ferry across the river.

The town was formally incorporated by the Iowa State Legislature on January 15, 1849 as Cedar Rapids, named for the rapids in the Cedar River (the river itself was named for the large number of red cedar trees that grew along its banks). The population was less than 400.

During the 1850s, Cedar Rapids grew in size, and it was during this decade that the Czech population became substantial; when the town was reincorporated in 1856, a quarter of its roughly 1,600 inhabitants were Czech immigrants. The availability of cheap land in the new state of Iowa happened to coincide with the Revolutions of 1848 in the Austrian Empire that caused a large number of Czechs to flee their homeland and emigrate to the U.S. In 1851, the institution that eventually become Coe College was founded. In the same decade, there were attempts by local leaders to improve the city's access to distant markets, first through purchase of a steamboat (aptly named Cedar Rapids) and ultimately through investment in a railroad. The first locomotive rolled into town on June 15, 1859.

Railroads were an important factor in Iowa's development - which at the end of the 19th century had the fifth largest track mileage of any state - and the growth of cities along rail lines such as Cedar Rapids.

In this same decade, "Major" John May, an inventor and land speculator, purchased the island (now called "May's Island") situated between Cedar Rapids and Kingston with the intention of founding a town he called May Island. When that scheme proved impractical due to the island's tendency to flood, he conceived the idea of making his island the center of a larger city that spanned the river and convinced the state legislature to officially name the land he had bought there, just south of Kingston, "West Cedar Rapids".

Cedar Rapids annexed the community of Kingston in 1870 and constructed an iron bridge across the river along the line of the current Third Avenue bridge.

The economic growth of Cedar Rapids increased in 1871 upon the founding of the Sinclair meatpacking company. The plant allowed for year-round meatpacking because ice could be harvested from the Cedar River in winter to chill an icehouse, and within a few years it became one of the largest factories of its kind in the country, employing 400 people. In 1873, the oatmeal mill that ultimately became the flagship operation of the Quaker Oats Company—and the largest cereal mill in the world—was built.

In 1909, the city acquired May's Island for the purpose of making it the seat of government; then, as now, there were ill feelings between east- and west-siders in Cedar Rapids, and the city's leaders hoped that putting City Hall in the "neutral territory" of the island would help ease tensions. In 1919, the residents of Linn County voted to move the county seat from Marion to Cedar Rapids, partially because Cedar Rapids had offered to donate the southern third of the island as a site for a new county courthouse and jail.

=== Flood of 2008 ===
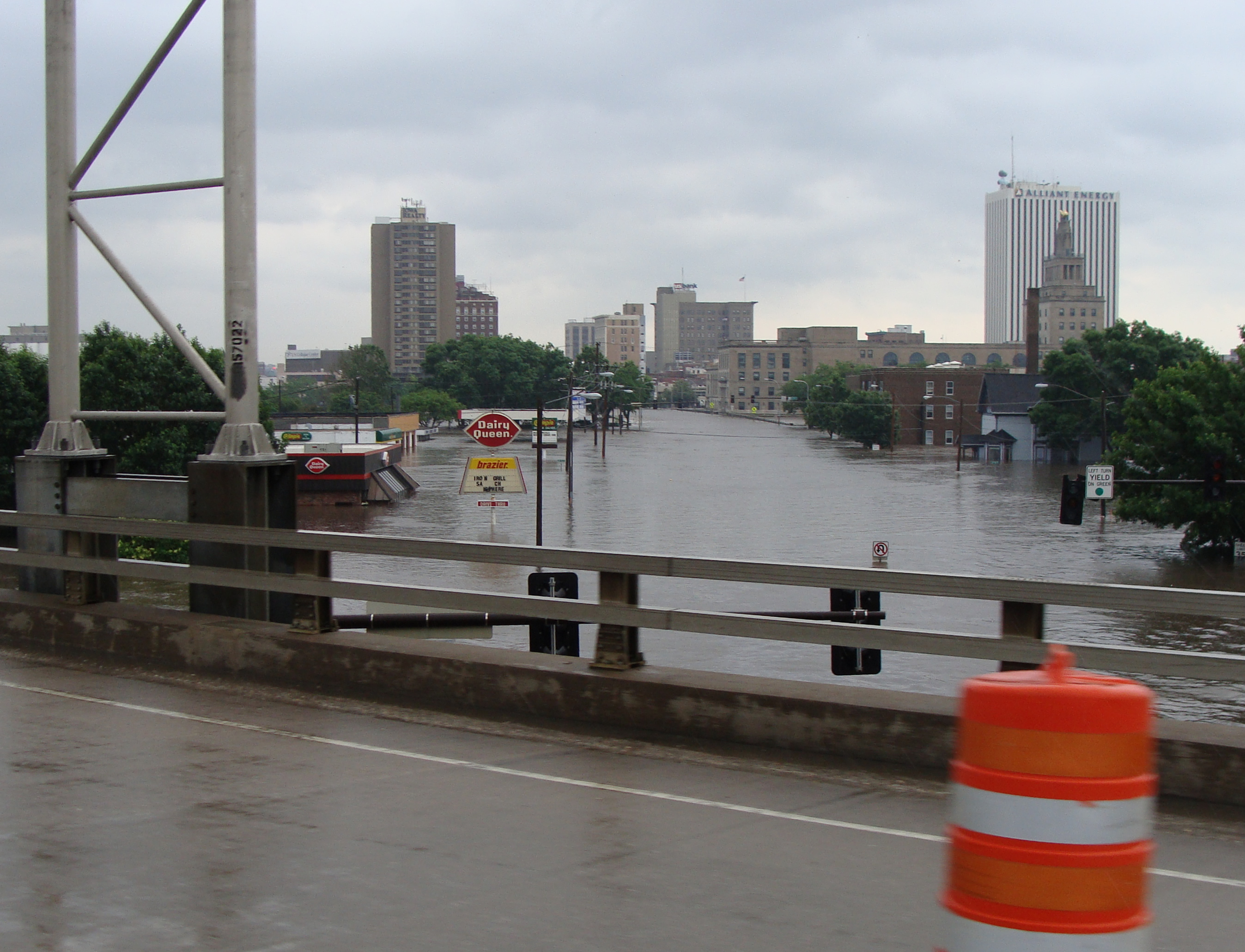
Flooded Business District on June 12, 2008

During the Iowa flood of 2008, the Cedar River reached a record high of 31.12 feet (9.49 m) on June 13 (the previous record was 20 feet (6.1 m)), surpassing the 500-year flood plain. 1,126 city blocks were flooded, or more than 10 square miles (26 km^{2}), and 561 city blocks were severely damaged, on both banks of the Cedar River, comprising 14% of the city's total area. 7,749 flooded properties had to be evacuated, including 5,900 homes and 310 city facilities, among them the City Hall, Central Fire Station, Main Public Library, Ground Transportation Center, Public Works building, and the Animal Control building. It is estimated that at least 1,300 properties in the Cedar Rapids area had to be demolished because of the flood, which caused several billions of dollars in damages. More than 4,000 members of the Iowa National Guard were activated to assist the city. The temporary levees became saturated not only with the flood waters but also with additional rainfall, causing them to fail.

Until the flood, the city's government was headquartered in the Veterans Memorial Building, near the Linn County Courthouse and jail on Mays Island in the Cedar River; it was designed to be the only island used in this manner in North and South America.

=== Flood of 2016 ===
During the flood of 2016, remnants of Hurricane Paine from the eastern Pacific Ocean via the Gulf of California caused the second highest recorded crest of the Cedar River in Cedar Rapids, reaching 22 feet (6.7 m) on September 27. The inundation of southern Minnesota, central and western Wisconsin, and northeastern Iowa by Hurricane Paine's remnants began on September 21 and 22 and continued until the end of the month. The cresting in Cedar Rapids was below the initial estimate of 25 feet (7.6 m) and the revised estimate of 23 feet (7.0 m), but more than 10 feet (3.0 m) above the flood stage of 12 feet (3.7 m). The flood was above levels considered to have about a 1% chance of occurring in a given year. (Note: The September 2016 flood level is misleadingly referred to as the "once in a 100-year flood".) More than 5,000 homes were affected, causing over 5,000 people to evacuate. The Cedar Rapids Schools were closed for a week.

In 2015, Cedar Rapids approved a $625 million flood protection plan over 20 years for levee improvements. Although the improvement to the levee system in Cedar Rapids had not been completed due to over $80 million in funding not appropriated by the United States Congresses of 2014 and 2016 and the voting down by local residents of a temporary increase in the local sales tax to pay for the levee improvements, (Note: $15 million in revenues are expected from a 2016 passage of a local sales tax increase to provide some funding for levee improvements.) out of school students along with hundreds of thousands of volunteers and 412 Iowa National Guard troops filled more than a quarter of a million sandbags in a successful effort to prevent any major flooding of the city outside the evacuation zone. A 9.8-mile (15.8 km) system of Hesco barriers, earthen berms, and over 400,000 sandbags were used to plug the gaps in the levee system. The city of Cedar Rapids purchased additional Hesco barriers from Iowa City for $1.4 million. Numerous upstream cities that had been earlier affected by the September flooding and mandatory evacuations, including Charles City, Greene, Manchester, Clarksville, Shell Rock, Vinton, Janesville, Cedar Falls and Waterloo, sent hundreds of thousands of unused sandbags to support efforts in Cedar Rapids and nearby communities. The remnants of Hurricane Paine did not produce any rain to saturate the temporary earth berms and sandbags, which would have greatly increased the likelihood of breach in the temporary levee structures, causing a much greater flooded area; the river crested during very sunny weather. Additionally, beginning on September 25, 300 to 400 National Guard troops along with the Iowa State Patrol, other law enforcement agencies, and 60 duly sworn law enforcement officials enforced a nightly 8pm to 7am curfew.

=== August 10, 2020, Midwest derecho ===
On August 10, 2020, an intense derecho formed over the Midwest and moved eastward across Iowa, with Cedar Rapids being the hardest-hit city. Sustained winds of 60 to 80 miles per hour (97 to 129 km/h), frequent gusts of 110 miles per hour (180 km/h) or greater, and an estimated peak gust of 140 miles per hour (230 km/h) on the southwest side of the city damaged the majority of residential and commercial buildings in Cedar Rapids, as well as 20 schools, and resulted in the closure of most local businesses. Thousands of trees were downed throughout all 75 square miles of Cedar Rapids. Most of the city's roads became mostly blocked or impassible due to downed trees and blown limbs, power poles along with their lines, and general debris, like large road signs, as well as damaged buildings, homes, and farms. 95% of the city was without power. Trash pickup stopped, cell phone service was very spotty for multiple days, and many gas leaks were reported. Interstate 380 was closed between Cedar Rapids and Iowa City.

Hospitals treated over 300 patients for storm related injuries. Professional estimates suggested that cleanup and removal of the city's downed trees could take months. Arborists urged residents not to clear trees on their own, in order to avoid injury.

On Friday, August 14, Governor Kim Reynolds arrived in Cedar Rapids, accompanied by Adjutant General Benjamin Corell of the Iowa National Guard. Gen. Corell said he had not seen a comparable level of damage since Hurricane Katrina in 2005. Other city officials described the damage as being even worse than the Iowa flood of 2008.

== Geography ==
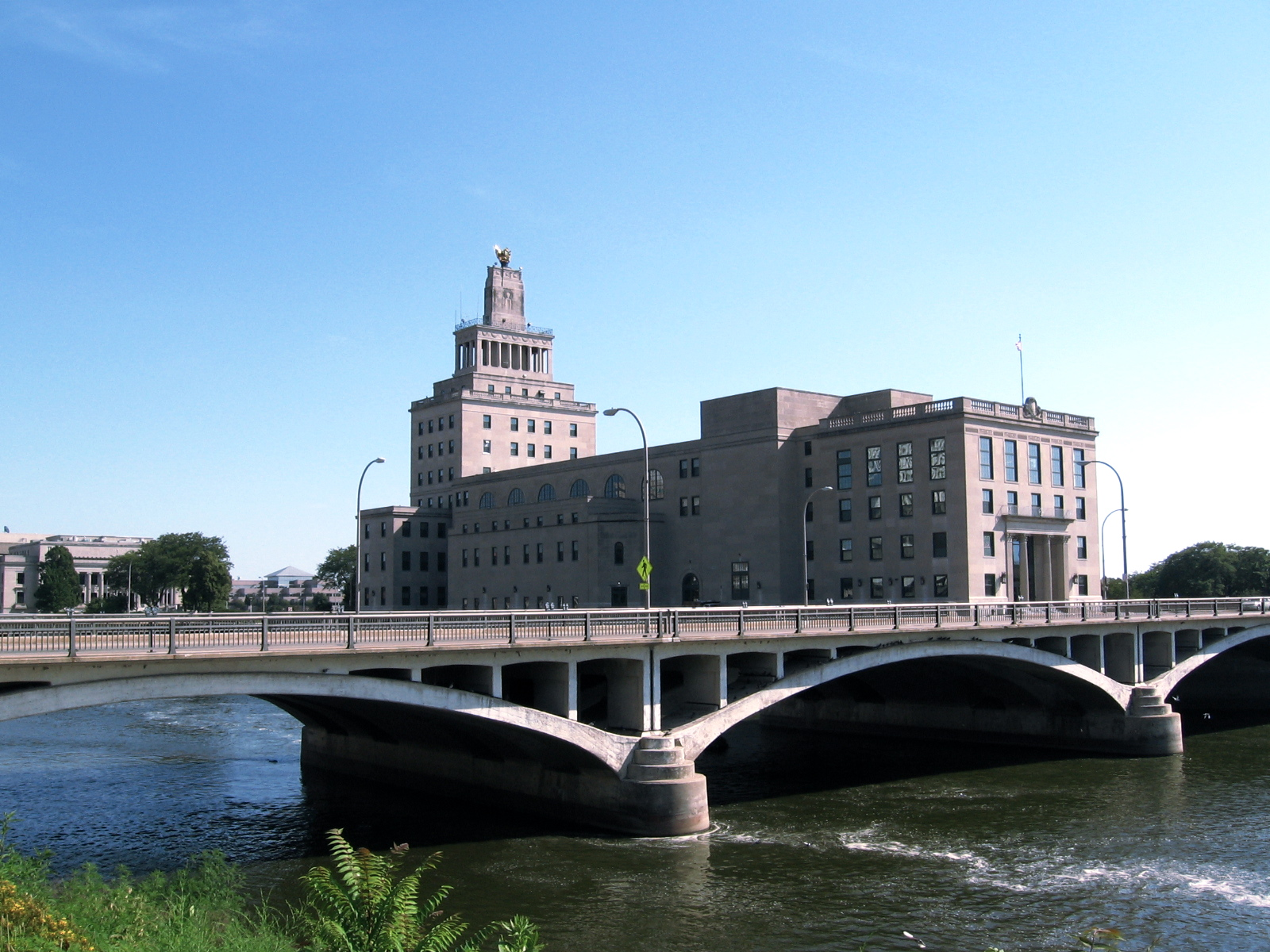
Mays Island, with the Linn County Courthouse in the rear of the former City Hall

The city is divided into four quadrants, used in assigning street addresses. 1st Avenue (U.S. Route 151 Business) divides the north and south sides of the city, and the Cedar River divides east and west. Mays Island, in the middle of the river, is the only area of the city where addresses have no quadrant. Areas outside the city limits that have a Cedar Rapids mailing address do not use the quadrants either.

Except in the downtown area, 1st Avenue and the Cedar River tend to run diagonally instead of along the cardinal directions. Due to the curving of 1st Avenue, there are some areas in western Cedar Rapids where NW addresses are actually south of SW addresses.

Cedar Rapids is divided into 14 ZIP Codes. Mays Island and the downtown area are covered by 52401. The northeast quadrant is covered by 52402 and 52411. The southeast quadrant is covered by 52403. The southwest quadrant is covered by 52404. The northwest quadrant is covered by 52405. Post office boxes are covered by ZIP codes 52406, 52407, 52408, 52409, and 52410. Several other ZIP codes are for specific businesses (Aegon USA, Collins Aerospace, etc.).

According to the United States Census Bureau, the city has a total area of 76.037 square miles (196.93 km^{2}), of which 74.787 square miles (193.70 km^{2}) is land and 1.250 square miles (3.24 km^{2}) (1.64%) is water.

=== Neighborhoods ===
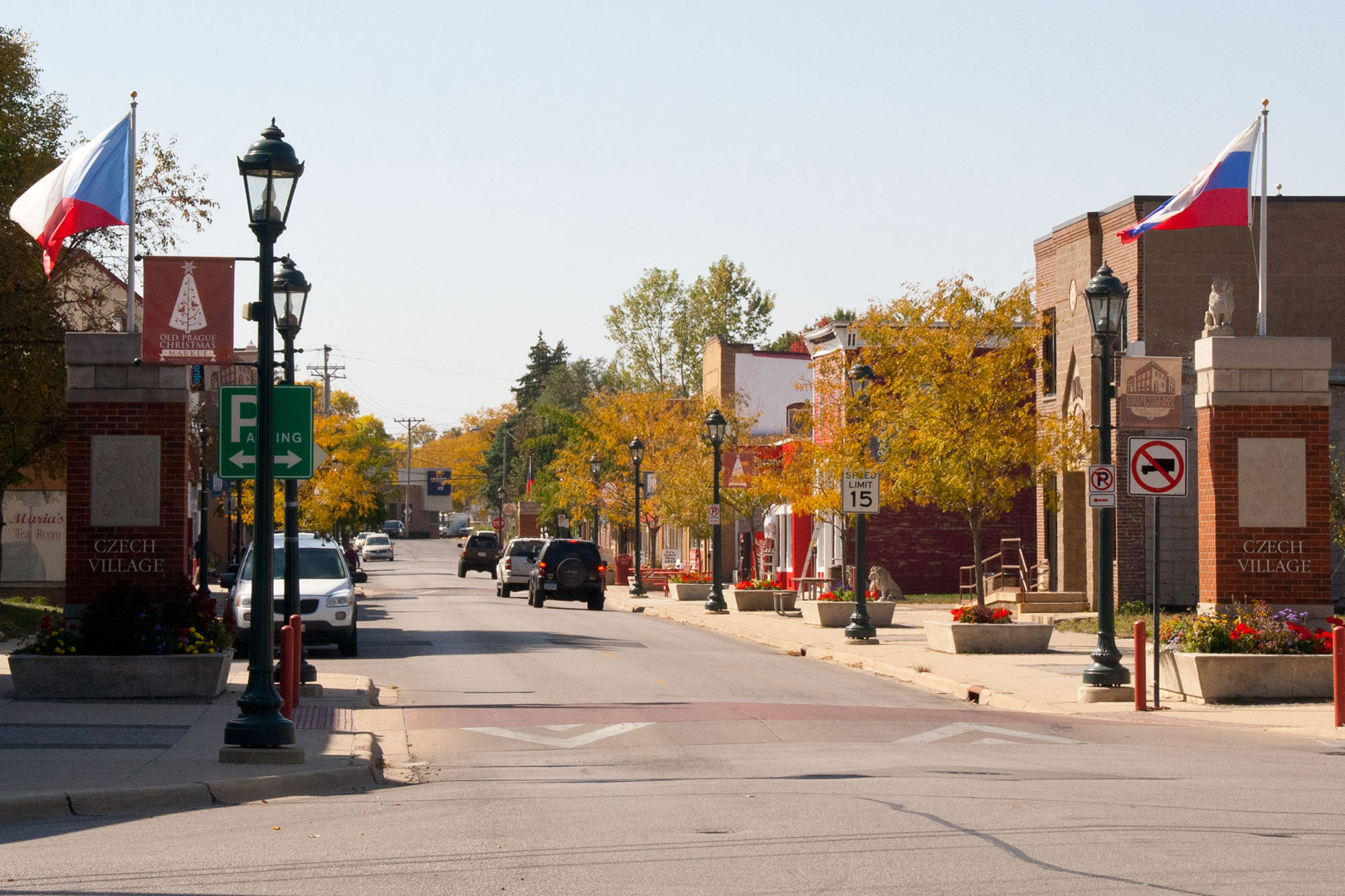
Bohemian Commercial Historic District, Czech Village

There are twelve active neighborhood associations in Cedar Rapids. The neighborhoods nearest downtown include Wellington Heights and Oakhill Jackson in the southeast quadrant and Moundview in the northeast quadrant. Also farther north in the northeast quadrant are Noelridge Park and Kenwood Park, which was independent until it was incorporated into the Cedar Rapids city limits. The boundaries of Kenwood are 32nd Street to Oakland Road to Old Marion Road to C Avenue to 40th Street then 1st Avenue between 40th street and 32nd Street.

In addition to the neighborhood associations in Cedar Rapids, there are many informal, unofficial neighborhoods, such as Bowman Woods, Vernon Heights, Stoney Point, Kingston Village, New Bohemia (NewBo) and Wilderness Estates.

Czech Village is located along 16th Avenue SW, south of the Cedar River. It is home to such Czech-themed businesses as The Czech Cottage, Sykora Bakery, and White Lion Treasures. The National Czech & Slovak Museum & Library is one of Cedar Rapids' major tourist attractions. The museum's main building was directly on the river and was badly damaged by the 2008 floods. After the flood the museum moved a few blocks to Inspiration Place SW. The Bohemian National Cemetery is located nearby.

In 2024, a new astronomical clock was built; the opening was attended by Czech President Petr Pavel, his wife Eva Pavlová and Slovak President Peter Pellegrini.

=== Climate ===
Cedar Rapids has a humid continental climate with long, cold, sometimes brutal winters with plenty of snow, while summers are hot and humid, with frequent severe thunderstorms.

The record low temperature in Cedar Rapids is −30 °F (−34 °C), set on January 31, 2019, while the record high temperature of 110 °F (43 °C) was set on July 6, 1911.

Climate data for Cedar Rapids, Iowa (Eastern Iowa Airport), 1991–2020 normals, extremes 1893–present
Month	Jan	Feb	Mar	Apr	May	Jun	Jul	Aug	Sep	Oct	Nov	Dec	Year
Record high °F (°C)	65 (18)	76 (24)	89 (32)	95 (35)	104 (40)	103 (39)	110 (43)	108 (42)	105 (41)	94 (34)	79 (26)	73 (23)	110 (43)
Mean maximum °F (°C)	49.0 (9.4)	55.0 (12.8)	71.3 (21.8)	82.4 (28.0)	87.5 (30.8)	91.5 (33.1)	92.7 (33.7)	91.7 (33.2)	89.7 (32.1)	82.6 (28.1)	67.9 (19.9)	53.9 (12.2)	94.4 (34.7)
Mean daily maximum °F (°C)	27.9 (−2.3)	32.6 (0.3)	46.3 (7.9)	60.1 (15.6)	71.1 (21.7)	80.1 (26.7)	82.8 (28.2)	81.2 (27.3)	74.7 (23.7)	61.5 (16.4)	46.2 (7.9)	33.3 (0.7)	58.2 (14.5)
Daily mean °F (°C)	19.6 (−6.9)	24.1 (−4.4)	36.5 (2.5)	48.9 (9.4)	60.3 (15.7)	69.9 (21.1)	72.8 (22.7)	70.8 (21.6)	63.3 (17.4)	50.7 (10.4)	37.0 (2.8)	25.2 (−3.8)	48.3 (9.0)
Mean daily minimum °F (°C)	11.3 (−11.5)	15.5 (−9.2)	26.8 (−2.9)	37.6 (3.1)	49.5 (9.7)	59.7 (15.4)	62.7 (17.1)	60.4 (15.8)	51.9 (11.1)	39.9 (4.4)	27.7 (−2.4)	17.1 (−8.3)	38.3 (3.5)
Mean minimum °F (°C)	−12.7 (−24.8)	−5.9 (−21.1)	5.0 (−15.0)	21.8 (−5.7)	34.4 (1.3)	47.2 (8.4)	52.5 (11.4)	50.1 (10.1)	36.3 (2.4)	23.0 (−5.0)	10.4 (−12.0)	−5.1 (−20.6)	−17.1 (−27.3)
Record low °F (°C)	−30 (−34)	−27 (−33)	−20 (−29)	1 (−17)	24 (−4)	36 (2)	42 (6)	37 (3)	22 (−6)	−2 (−19)	−11 (−24)	−28 (−33)	−30 (−34)
Average precipitation inches (mm)	0.95 (24)	1.22 (31)	1.99 (51)	3.56 (90)	4.25 (108)	5.56 (141)	4.41 (112)	4.07 (103)	3.40 (86)	2.91 (74)	2.00 (51)	1.59 (40)	35.91 (911)
Average snowfall inches (cm)	6.2 (16)	6.9 (18)	3.1 (7.9)	1.0 (2.5)	0.0 (0.0)	0.0 (0.0)	0.0 (0.0)	0.0 (0.0)	0.0 (0.0)	0.0 (0.0)	1.7 (4.3)	7.8 (20)	26.7 (68.7)
Average precipitation days (≥ 0.01 inch)	7.2	6.7	9.1	11.9	12.5	12.3	9.8	9.9	8.6	9.2	8.1	8.0	113.3
Average snowy days (≥ 0.1 in)	4.6	4.2	2.4	0.5	0.0	0.0	0.0	0.0	0.0	0.0	1.0	4.6	17.3
Source 1: NOAA (snow/snow days 1981–2010)
Source 2: National Weather Service

Climate data for Cedar Rapids NO 1, Iowa (located in Marion) 1991–2020 normals, extremes 1892–present
Month	Jan	Feb	Mar	Apr	May	Jun	Jul	Aug	Sep	Oct	Nov	Dec	Year
Record high °F (°C)	68 (20)	76 (24)	88 (31)	94 (34)	104 (40)	103 (39)	110 (43)	108 (42)	105 (41)	94 (34)	80 (27)	69 (21)	110 (43)
Mean maximum °F (°C)	50.5 (10.3)	55.8 (13.2)	70.9 (21.6)	82.2 (27.9)	87.9 (31.1)	92.5 (33.6)	94.2 (34.6)	92.8 (33.8)	90.0 (32.2)	83.2 (28.4)	68.1 (20.1)	54.0 (12.2)	95.7 (35.4)
Mean daily maximum °F (°C)	30.0 (−1.1)	35.1 (1.7)	48.9 (9.4)	63.3 (17.4)	73.8 (23.2)	82.3 (27.9)	85.5 (29.7)	83.4 (28.6)	77.3 (25.2)	64.1 (17.8)	48.1 (8.9)	34.7 (1.5)	60.5 (15.8)
Daily mean °F (°C)	21.3 (−5.9)	25.9 (−3.4)	38.2 (3.4)	50.9 (10.5)	61.7 (16.5)	71.0 (21.7)	74.4 (23.6)	72.3 (22.4)	65.2 (18.4)	52.8 (11.6)	38.7 (3.7)	26.7 (−2.9)	49.9 (9.9)
Mean daily minimum °F (°C)	12.5 (−10.8)	16.6 (−8.6)	27.5 (−2.5)	38.4 (3.6)	49.6 (9.8)	59.6 (15.3)	63.3 (17.4)	61.2 (16.2)	53.0 (11.7)	41.5 (5.3)	29.3 (−1.5)	18.6 (−7.4)	39.3 (4.1)
Mean minimum °F (°C)	−11.2 (−24.0)	−4.9 (−20.5)	6.0 (−14.4)	22.7 (−5.2)	34.4 (1.3)	46.5 (8.1)	52.9 (11.6)	50.9 (10.5)	37.6 (3.1)	25.0 (−3.9)	12.0 (−11.1)	−2.8 (−19.3)	−14.9 (−26.1)
Record low °F (°C)	−33 (−36)	−28 (−33)	−17 (−27)	3 (−16)	24 (−4)	36 (2)	42 (6)	37 (3)	22 (−6)	−2 (−19)	−10 (−23)	−28 (−33)	−33 (−36)
Average precipitation inches (mm)	1.17 (30)	1.34 (34)	2.06 (52)	4.02 (102)	4.74 (120)	5.68 (144)	4.47 (114)	4.42 (112)	3.96 (101)	3.00 (76)	2.22 (56)	1.67 (42)	38.75 (984)
Average snowfall inches (cm)	8.7 (22)	8.3 (21)	4.0 (10)	1.5 (3.8)	0.0 (0.0)	0.0 (0.0)	0.0 (0.0)	0.0 (0.0)	0.0 (0.0)	0.6 (1.5)	2.2 (5.6)	9.0 (23)	34.3 (87)
Average precipitation days (≥ 0.01 in)	8.9	7.6	9.5	11.3	13.0	12.3	9.6	9.6	8.8	9.5	8.4	9.1	117.6
Average snowy days (≥ 0.1 in)	6.9	5.1	2.9	1.1	0.0	0.0	0.0	0.0	0.0	0.4	2.0	6.2	24.6
Source: NOAA

== Demographics ==
Historical population
Census	Pop.	Note	%±
1860	1,830		—
1870	5,940		224.6%
1880	10,104		70.1%
1890	18,020		78.3%
1900	25,656		42.4%
1910	32,811		27.9%
1920	45,566		38.9%
1930	56,097		23.1%
1940	62,120		10.7%
1950	72,296		16.4%
1960	92,035		27.3%
1970	110,642		20.2%
1980	110,243		−0.4%
1990	108,751		−1.4%
2000	120,758		11.0%
2010	126,326		4.6%
2020	137,710		9.0%
2025 (est.)	137,935		0.2%
U.S. Decennial Census; 2020 Census

According to realtor website Zillow, the average price of a home as of December 31, 2025, in Cedar Rapids is $202,097.

As of the 2024 American Community Survey, there are 59,074 estimated households in Cedar Rapids with an average of 2.28 persons per household. The city has a median household income of $69,917. Approximately 10.5% of the city's population lives at or below the poverty line. Cedar Rapids has an estimated 65.7% employment rate, with 32.9% of the population holding a bachelor's degree or higher and 93.1% holding a high school diploma. There were 64,678 housing units at an average density of 864.83 per square mile (333.9/km^{2}).

The median age in the city was 37.7 years.

Cedar Rapids, Iowa – racial and ethnic composition Note: the US Census treats Hispanic/Latino as an ethnic category. This table excludes Latinos from the racial categories and assigns them to a separate category. Hispanics/Latinos may be of any race.
Race / ethnicity (NH = non-Hispanic)	Pop. 1990	Pop. 2000	Pop. 2010	Pop. 2020	% 1990	% 2000	% 2010	% 2020
White alone (NH)	103,060	109,759	108,696	105,250	94.77%	90.89%	86.04%	76.43%
Black or African American alone (NH)	3,084	4,425	6,880	14,153	2.84%	3.66%	5.45%	10.28%
Native American or Alaska Native alone (NH)	240	279	338	274	0.22%	0.23%	0.27%	0.20%
Asian alone (NH)	1,043	2,121	2,779	3,747	0.96%	1.76%	2.20%	2.72%
Pacific Islander alone (NH)	—	77	132	484	—	0.06%	0.10%	0.35%
Other race alone (NH)	81	145	107	404	0.07%	0.12%	0.08%	0.29%
Mixed race or multiracial (NH)	—	1,887	3,218	6,896	—	1.56%	2.55%	5.01%
Hispanic or Latino (any race)	1,243	2,065	4,176	6,502	1.14%	1.71%	3.31%	4.72%
Total	108,751	120,758	126,326	137,710	100.00%	100.00%	100.00%	100.00%

=== 2020 census ===
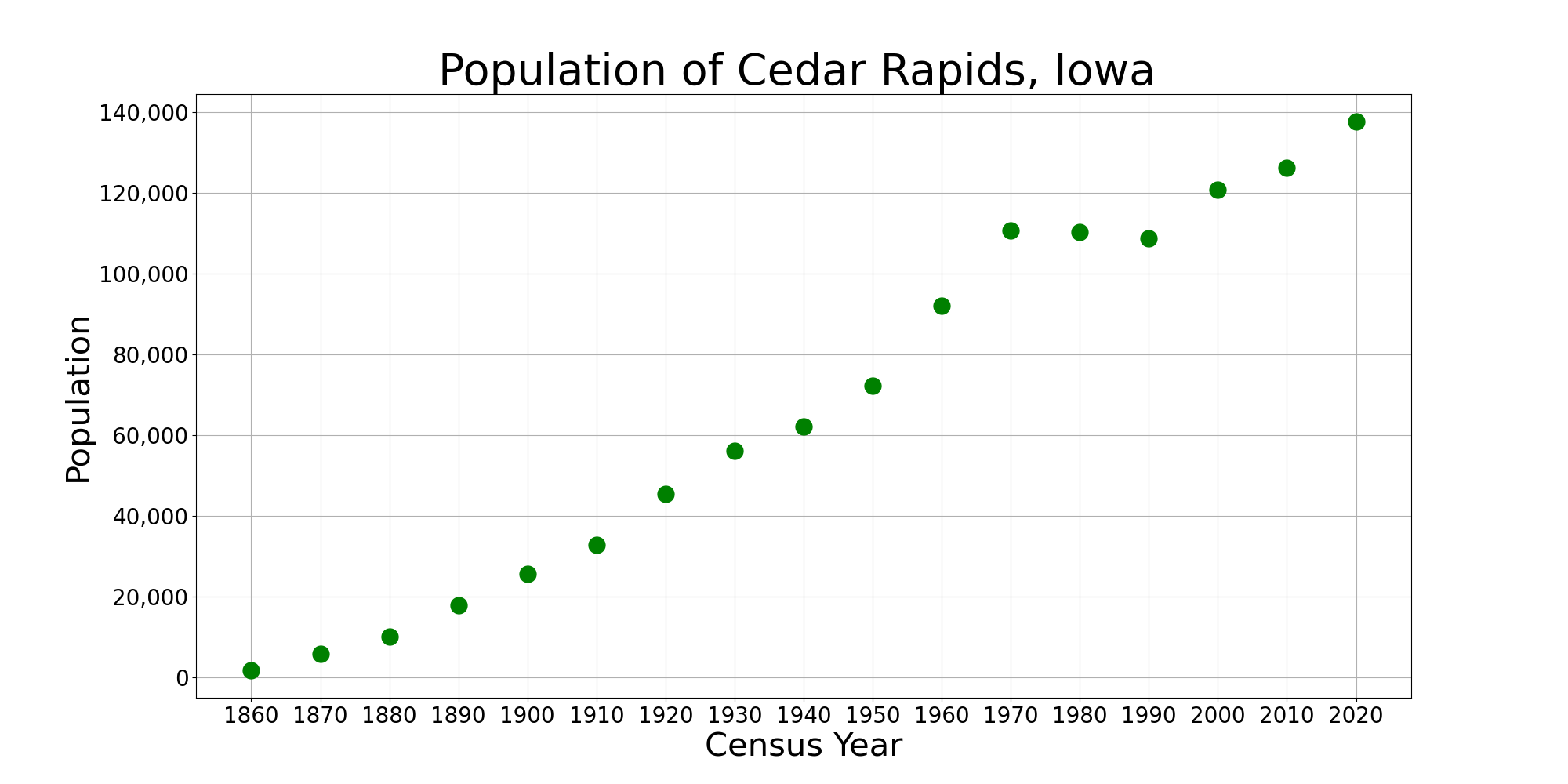
Population of Cedar Rapids from the U.S. census data

As of the 2020 census, there were 137,710 people, 58,128 households, and 33,116 families residing in the city. The population density was 1,909.91 inhabitants per square mile (737.4/km^{2}). There were 62,398 housing units at an average density of 865.40 per square mile (334.1/km^{2}). The racial makeup of the city was 77.79% White, 10.41% African American, 0.29% Native American, 2.73% Asian, 0.35% Pacific Islander, 1.65% from some other races and 6.77% from two or more races. Hispanic or Latino people of any race were 4.72% of the population.

=== 2010 census ===
As of the 2010 census, there were 126,326 people, 53,236 households and 30,931 families residing in the city. The population density was 1,784.29 inhabitants per square mile (688.9/km^{2}). There were 57,217 housing units at an average density of 808.16 per square mile (312.0/km^{2}). The racial makeup of the city was 87.98% White, 5.58% African American, 0.31% Native American, 2.21% Asian, 0.12% Pacific Islander, 0.93% from some other races and 2.87% from two or more races. Hispanic or Latino people of any race were 3.31% of the population.

There were 53,236 households, of which 28.9% had children under the age of 18 living with them, 42.8% were married couples living together, 11.0% had a female householder with no husband present, and 41.9% were non-families. 32.5% of all households were made up of individuals and 10.3% had someone living alone who was 65 years of age or older. The average household size was 2.31 and the average family size was 2.95.

The age distribution was 23.5% under the age of 18, 11.2% from 18 to 24, 27.4% from 25 to 44, 24.8% from 45 to 64 and 13.1% who were 65 years of age or older. The median age was 35.3 years. For every 100 females, there were 96.6 males. For every 100 females age 18 and over, there were 94.4 males.

The median income for a household in the city was $51,186, and the median income for a family was $63,265. Males had a median income of $40,413 versus $26,402 for females. The per capita income for the city is $26,370. About 6.3% of families and 11.7% of the population were below the poverty line, including 15.5% of those under the age of 18 and 4.3% of those 65 or older.

=== 2000 census ===
As of the 2000 census, there were 120,758 people, 49,820 households, and 30,838 families residing in the city. The population density was 1,912.66 inhabitants per square mile (738.5/km^{2}). There were 52,240 housing units at an average density of 827.42 per square mile (319.5/km^{2}). The racial makeup of the city was 91.86% White, 3.71% African American, 0.25% Native American, 1.77% Asian, 0.06% Pacific Islander, 0.55% from some other races and 1.79% from two or more races. Hispanic or Latino people of any race were 1.71% of the population.

There were 49,820 households out of which 29.9% had children under the age of 18 living with them, 48.4% were married couples living together, 10.0% had a female householder with no husband present, and 38.1% were non-families. 30.2% of all households were made up of individuals and 9.7% had someone living alone who was 65 years of age or older. The average household size was 2.36 and the average family size was 2.96.

In the city the population was spread out with 24.5% under the age of 18, 10.8% from 18 to 24, 30.7% from 25 to 44, 20.9% from 45 to 64, and 13.1% who were 65 years of age or older. The median age was 35 years. For every 100 females there were 95.0 males. For every 100 females age 18 and over, there were 92.1 males.

The median income for a household in the city was $43,704, and the median income for a family was $54,286. Males had a median income of $37,217 versus $26,251 for females. The per capita income for the city was $22,589. About 4.9% of families and 7.5% of the population were below the poverty line, including 8.8% of those under age 18 and 6.9% of those age 65 or over.

=== Religion ===
53.7% of the people of Cedar Rapids are religious with 0.7% of the population identifying as Muslim, 0.4% as associated with eastern religions, 0.1% as Jewish and 52.5% identifying as Christians. Roman Catholics comprise 20% of the population followed by Lutherans at 9.8%, Methodists at 7.5%, and Presbyterians at 3.2%.

The Mother Mosque of America, dedicated on June 16, 1934, is the longest-standing mosque in North America. In 1972, another mosque was built and the original mosque was sold and fell into disrepair before being purchased in 1990 by the Islamic Council of Iowa and renovated. It is on the National Register of Historic Places. The Iowa flood of 2008 extensively damaged the basement, destroying many historic documents. Muslim presence in the area dates to 1895 when the first immigrants arrived from the Beqaa Valley in today's Lebanon and Syria. Islamic Services of America was established in Cedar Rapids in 1975 and provides Halal certification and supervision throughout the world.

== Economy ==
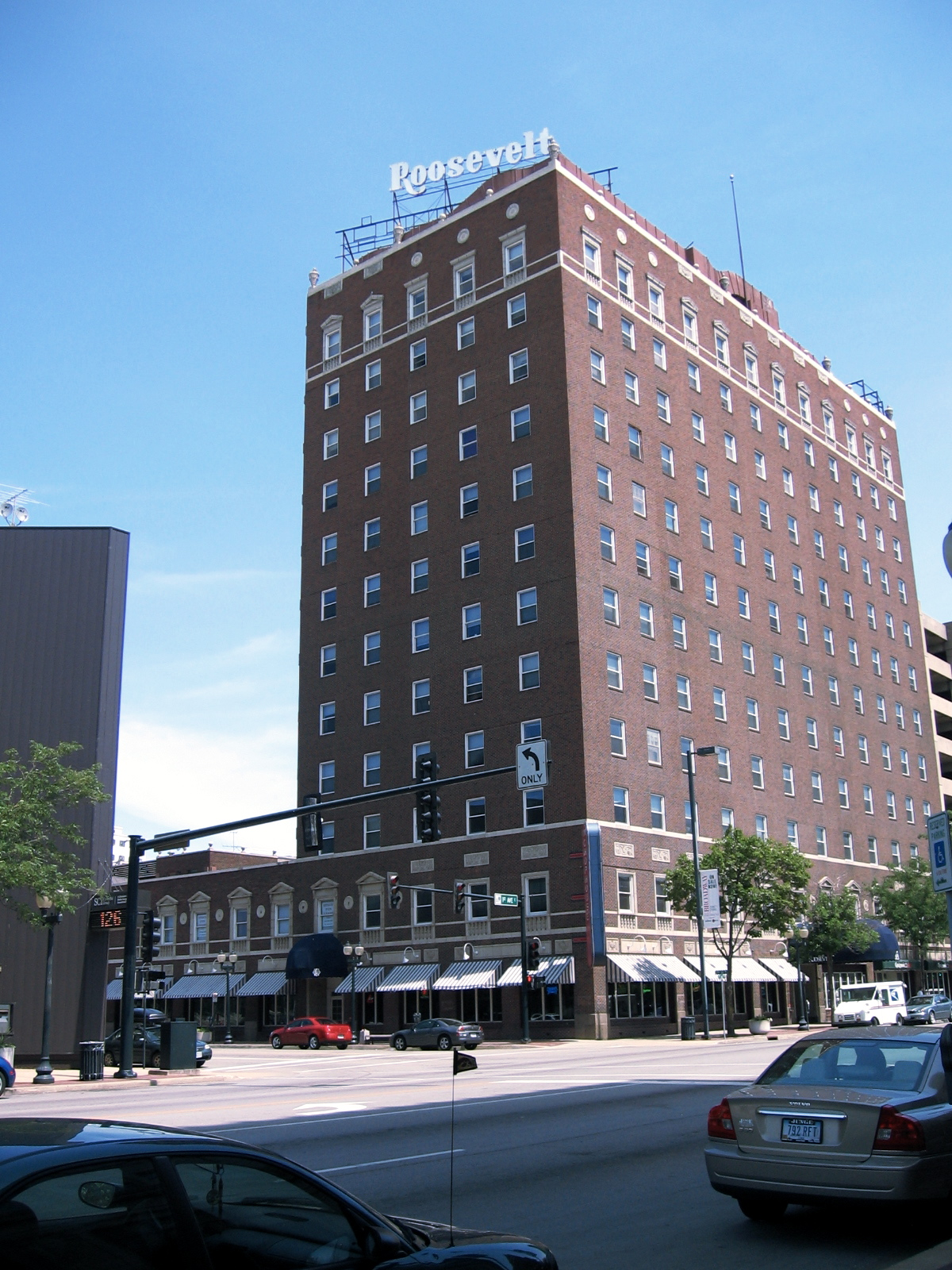
The 12-story Roosevelt Hotel was inaugurated in 1927.

Cedar Rapids is one of the largest cities in the world for corn processing. The grain processing industry is Cedar Rapids' most important sector, directly providing 4,000 jobs that pay on average $85,000, and also providing 8,000 indirectly. Fortune 500 company Collins Aerospace and trucking company CRST are based in Cedar Rapids, and Aegon has its United States headquarters there. A large Quaker Oats mill, one of the four that merged in 1901 to form Quaker Oats, dominates the north side of downtown. Other large companies that have facilities in Cedar Rapids include Archer Daniels Midland, Cargill, General Mills, Toyota Financial Services and Nordstrom. Newspaperarchive, based in Cedar Rapids, is the largest newspaper archive in North America with a repository of more than 150 million pages assembled over 250 years; it was taken offline for two days by the 2008 flood.

In February 2025 the city and Alliant Energy announced that Quality Technology Services will build a $750 million data center in Cedar Rapids, the largest economic development in its history, ultimately providing 30 jobs.

=== Top employers ===
According to the city's 2024 Annual Comprehensive Financial Report, the largest employers in the city are:

#	Employer	Employees
1	Collins Aerospace	5,000 to 9,999
2	Aegon USA	1,000 to 4,999
3	Cedar Rapids Community School District	1,000 to 4,999
4	City of Cedar Rapids	1,000 to 4,999
5	Cedar Rapids Steel Transport	1,000 to 4,999
6	Kirkwood Community College	1,000 to 4,999
7	PepsiCo	1,000 to 4,999
8	UnityPoint Health-St. Luke's Hospital	1,000 to 4,999
9	ADM Corn Processing	500 to 999
10	General Mills	500 to 999
11	Four Oaks	500 to 999
12	United States Postal Service	500 to 999
13	West Side Transport	500 to 999

=== Tourism ===
Cedar Rapids is nicknamed the "City of Five Seasons", for the so-called "fifth season", which is time to enjoy the other four. This slogan is often satirized by residents as the "City of Five Smells", as a result of the smell combinations in the 1970s from the city's Quaker Oats and Penford factories, a hog slaughterhouse, and the municipal sewage plant and landfill. The symbol of the five seasons is the Tree of Five Seasons sculpture in downtown along the north river bank. The name "Five Seasons" and representations of the sculpture appear throughout the city in many forms.

The city is home to the Cedar Rapids Museum of Art, the National Czech & Slovak Museum & Library, the Paramount Theatre, Orchestra Iowa, Theatre Cedar Rapids, the African American Museum of Iowa, and the Iowa Cultural Corridor Alliance. In the 1990s and 2000s, several Cedar Rapidians became well-known actors, including Ashton Kutcher, Elijah Wood, Terry Farrell, and Ron Livingston. The city is the setting for the musical The Pajama Game and the comedy film Cedar Rapids.

== Arts and culture ==
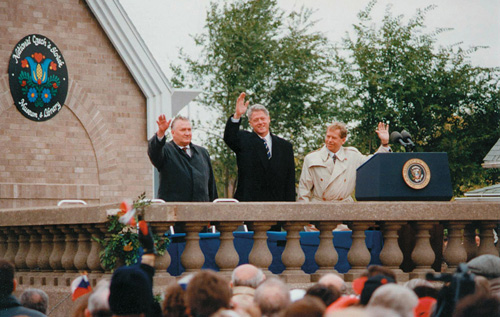
The presidents of the Czech Republic, Slovakia, and the United States dedicating the National Czech & Slovak Museum & Library in 1995

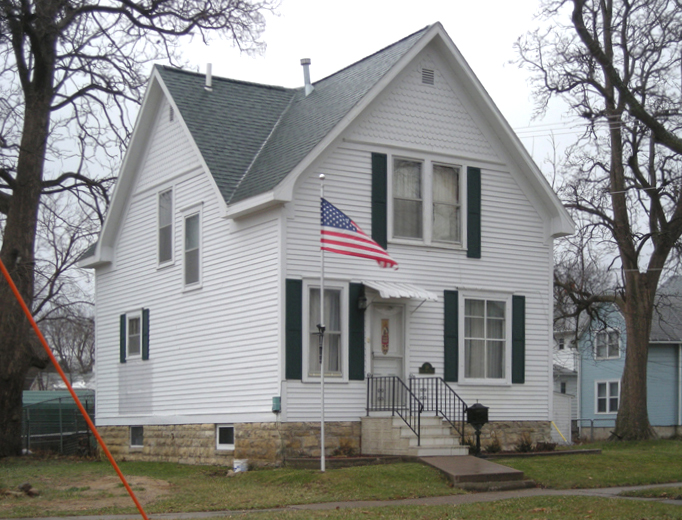
Grant Wood's boyhood home, listed as one of the most endangered historic sites in Iowa

Cedar Rapids is home to Orchestra Iowa, the Paramount Theatre, Theatre Cedar Rapids, Cedar Rapids Opera Theatre, McGrath Amphitheatre, and Brucemore, a National Trust Historic Site.

Cedar Rapids is also home to the Cedar Rapids Museum of Art, Cedar Rapids Ceramics Center, Legion Art's CSPS Hall, the National Czech & Slovak Museum & Library, the African American Historical Museum, Kirkwood Community College's Iowa Hall Gallery, and the legendary Grant Wood Studio at 5 Turner Alley. These Cedar Rapids venues have recently hosted world class and award nominated exhibitions, including the works of Andy Warhol, Grant Wood, and the Iowa Biennial, among others.

The Cedar Rapids Museum of Art houses the largest collection of Grant Wood paintings in the world. The 1920s Paramount Theatre is home to the Orchestra Iowa and the Cedar Rapids Area Theatre Organ Society. Concerts and events such as high school graduations, sporting events, exhibitions, and political rallies are held at Alliant Energy PowerHouse, formerly known as Five Seasons Center.

Many arts centers in Cedar Rapids sustained severe damage during the June 2008 flood. Among those severely damaged were the Paramount Theatre, Theatre Cedar Rapids, the National Czech & Slovak Museum, and the African American Historical Museum. Two Wurlitzer organs were damaged at the Paramount Theatre and Theatre Cedar Rapids. The Cedar Rapids Museum of Art suffered minor damage. It was expected to cost $25 million to repair the Paramount; Theatre Cedar Rapids reopened in February 2010.

Cedar Rapids is also home to the Mother Mosque of America, which is considered to be the oldest still-standing purpose-built mosque in the United States. The current mosque was built in 1934 and it was purchased by the Islamic Council of Iowa in 1991 to create a community center and refurbished historic site.

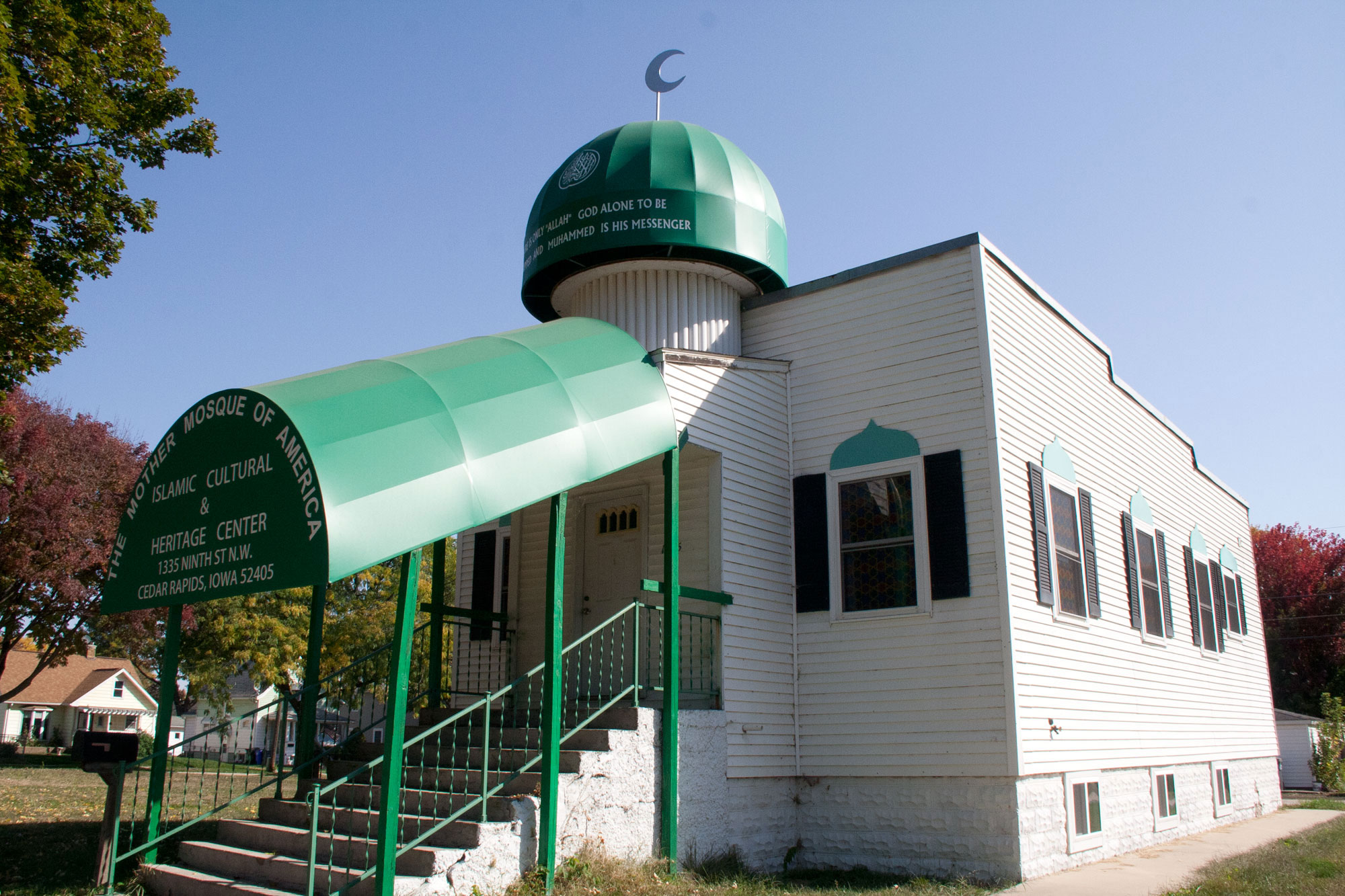
Mother Mosque of America

=== Flag ===
The current flag of Cedar Rapids was adopted on September 8, 2021. On the flag, the blue represents the Cedar River and the green portrays the city's green areas. Withal, the arch represents forwards progress, as well as the city's flood wall and the star represents the historic structures on Mays Island with its five stars depicting the City of Five Seasons.

In 1962, a flag design was chosen through a design contest among high schools. The artist, Fred Easker Jr, was a high-school senior at the time. The flag depicts buildings of Cedar Rapids in blue and the words "Cedar Rapids" and "Iowa" above and below it in red. Among the buildings depicted were: a veterans memorial, a church, corn stalks, a factory, an early mill and an unfinished building to signify the city's promising future.

In 2004, the North American Vexillological Association ranked Cedar Rapids' flag as among the worst flags in the United States. Moreover, the flag was decried during a TED Talk in 2015. On account of this criticism, Cedar Rapids began the process of redesigning the city's flag. Residents were asked for input on the colors, symbols, and themes they would like to have the flag include. On September 18, 2021, the city unveiled a new flag at Cedar Rapids Public Library.

== Sports ==
Cedar Rapids has been home to several sports teams:

- the Cedar Rapids Kernels, a member of minor league baseball's Midwest League since 1962, are the Class-A affiliate of the Minnesota Twins and play at Veterans Memorial Stadium
- the Cedar Rapids RoughRiders are members of the United States Hockey League, playing at the Cedar Rapids Ice Arena
- the Cedar Rapids River Kings played in the Indoor Football League at the U.S. Cellular Center and folded in 2020. Relaunched in 2022 as members of American Indoor Football.
- the Cedar Rapids Rampage played in the Major Arena Soccer League at the U.S. Cellular Center and folded in 2018.
- the Iowa Raptors FC are members of the United Premier Soccer League that began play in 2021.

The 15,000-capacity Kingston Stadium is located in Cedar Rapids. It is used for American football and soccer.

The city is also home to the Fifth Season Races, which began just after the running boom. In 1986, a former Iowa State University runner Joseph Kipsang won the popular 8-kilometer race in 23:24 and won $7,000. A few notable runners who have won include Keith Brantly, Janis Klecker, Jeff Jacobs, Kenneth Cheruiyot, and Pasca Myers. The race is not the largest road race in the region and most recently has included both the 8K and a 5K run.

== Parks and recreation ==
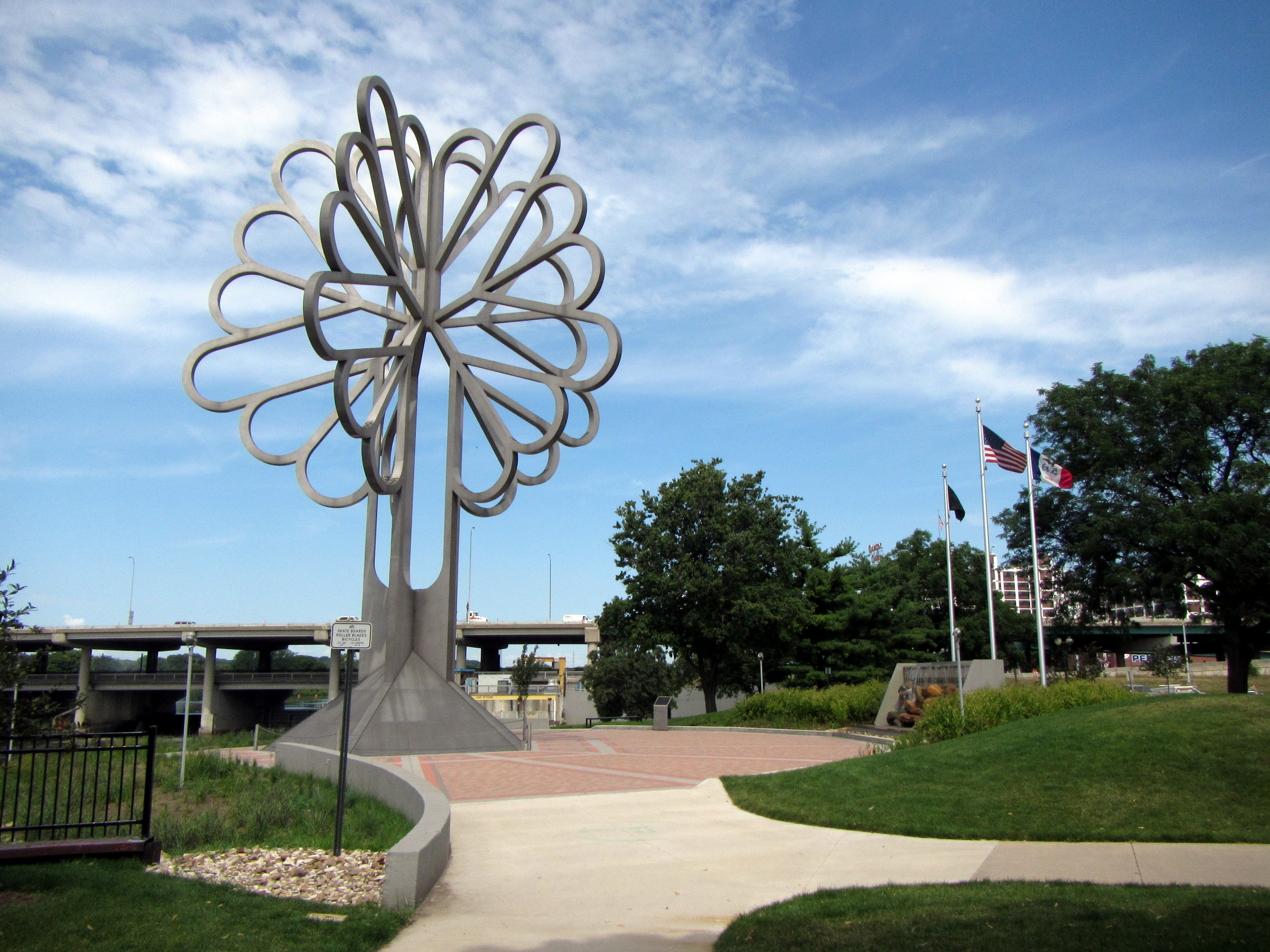
Tree of Five Seasons monument

Cedar Rapids has over 3,360 acres (13.6 km^{2}) of city owned property for undeveloped green space and recreational use. There are 74 formally named parks or recreational facilities. These include baseball and softball fields, all-weather basketball courts, two frisbee golf courses, sand volleyball courts, the Tuma Soccer Complex, a BMX dirt track, two off-leash dog exercise areas, the Old MacDonald's Farm (a children's zoo), 10 splash pads, and many parks that have pavilions, picnicking areas and restroom facilities. The various trail systems in Cedar Rapids have a total of 24 miles (39 km) for walking, running or bicycling.

The YMCA has had a local chapter since 1868. It has many facilities, including Camp Wapsie.

== Government ==
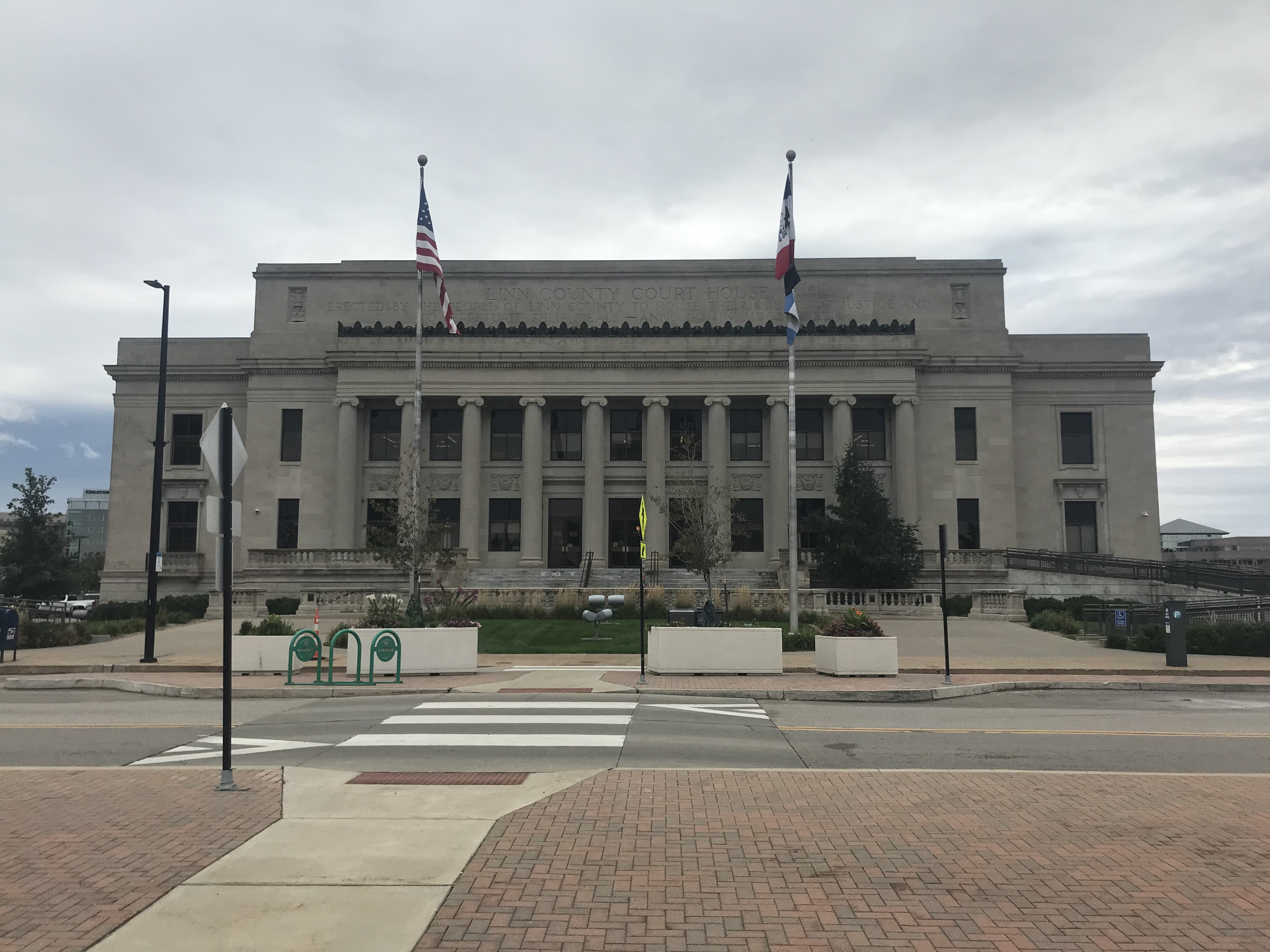
Linn County Courthouse

Cedar Rapids City Managers since 2006
City Manager	In office
Jim Prosser	2006–2010
Jeff Pomeranz	2010–present

From 1908 to 2005, Cedar Rapids used the city commission form of government. It was one of the few larger American cities remaining to operate under this model. Under this form of government, the council was made up of a public safety commissioner, a streets commissioner, a finance commissioner, a parks commissioner, and a mayor. The council members worked on a full-time basis, served two-year terms, and were considered department heads. Don Canney, the longest-serving mayor in city history, served for 22 years under this system. The last mayor of Cedar Rapids under this form of government was Paul Pate. In 2005, after the issue was brought forth by the city commission, 69% of voters moved to adopt a new form of government.

Cedar Rapids now has an Iowa Home Rule charter which establishes a weak mayor system with a part-time city council and mayor both on four-year terms. Jeff Pomeranz has served as the city's manager since 2010.

== Education ==
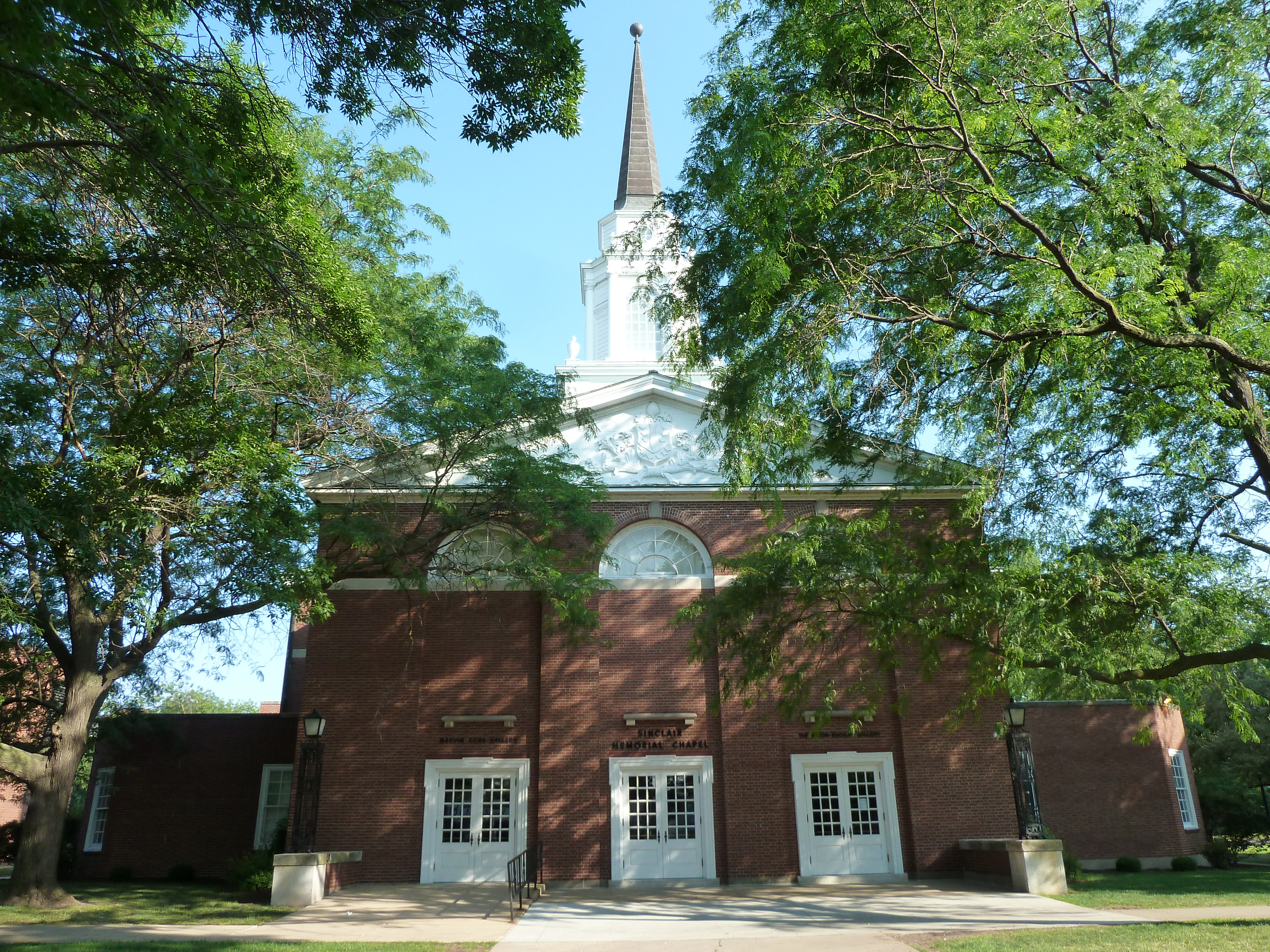
Coe College is a private liberal arts college in Cedar Rapids, Iowa

=== Colleges and universities ===
Cedar Rapids is home to two four-year colleges, Coe College and Mount Mercy University. The University of Iowa also has an evening MBA facility there. Kirkwood Community College is the area's only two-year college, while Kaplan University (formerly Hamilton College) and Upper Iowa University also have campuses there. Cornell College in Mount Vernon and the University of Iowa's main campus in Iowa City are both within 30 miles (48 km) of Cedar Rapids.

=== Primary and secondary schools ===
The Cedar Rapids Community School District (CRCSD) is the second-largest school district in the metropolitan area with an enrollment of 15,589 in the 2023–24 school year. Most of the city is in the district limits. The district contains 10 preschools, 21 elementary schools, 6 middle schools, and 5 high schools: City View Community, Jefferson, Kennedy, Metro High School (an alternative high school), and Washington.

Two neighboring school districts draw students from within the Cedar Rapids city limits. The Linn-Mar Community School District serves part of the northeast quadrant of the city and has seven elementary schools inside the city limits. The College Community School District serves part of the southwest quadrant of Cedar Rapids as well as neighboring rural portions of Linn, Benton and Johnson Counties. A central campus off Interstate 380 holds College Community's five elementary schools, Prairie Creek Intermediate, Prairie Point Middle School & Ninth Grade Academy, and Prairie High School. The Marion Independent School District also serves a portion.

The Cedar Rapids Metro Catholic Education System, which is affiliated with the Roman Catholic Archdiocese of Dubuque, consists of four elementary schools, two middle schools, one PK-8 school, and Xavier High School. The Cedar Rapids Catholic Education System and Cedar Rapids Community School District are synonymous with each other in the Cedar Rapids Public and Parochial School System.

The city hosts several private schools, including Summit Schools, Cedar Valley Christian School, Trinity Lutheran School, Isaac Newton Christian Academy, Faith Christian Learning Center, and Good Shepherd Lutheran School of the WELS.

== Media ==
=== Radio ===
Cedar Rapids' radio market, which consists of Linn County, is ranked 200th by Nielsen Audio, with 194,000 listeners aged 12 and older.

iHeart Media owns four stations in the Cedar Rapids area, including WMT 600 AM, a news/talk station that has broadcast since 1922. Clear Channel also owns KKSY-FM 96.5, a modern country music station; KMJM 1360 AM, a classic country station; KOSY-FM 95.7 FM, a hit music station; and KKRQ 100.7 FM, with a classic rock format, which is an Iowa City station that is typically highly rated in Cedar Rapids. Townsquare Media owns four radio stations in Cedar Rapids, which were formerly owned by Cumulus Media: KDAT 104.5 FM (adult contemporary), KHAK 98.1 FM (country music), and KRNA 94.1 FM (classic rock). Townsquare also operates KRQN 107.1 under a Lease-Management Agreement. KRQN broadcasts a (contemporary hits) format. Three other stations in Cedar Rapids are independently owned: KZIA 102.9 FM (contemporary hits), KGYM 1600 AM (sports radio), and KMRY 1450 AM/93.1 FM (Classic Hits). Several stations from Davenport; Waterloo; and Iowa City also figure into ratings in Cedar Rapids. These stations include Waterloo-licensed contemporary Christian "Life 101.9," KNWS-FM; KFMW 107.9 FM, known as "Rock 108," with an active rock format; and KOKZ 105.7 FM, which has a classic hits format.

The only noncommercial station licensed to Cedar Rapids is KCCK-FM 88.3 FM, a jazz station licensed to Kirkwood Community College. KXGM 89.1 is a non-commercial contemporary Christian music station licensed to neighboring Hiawatha. NPR stations from Cedar Falls (KUNI (FM) 90.9 FM) and Iowa City (KSUI 91.7 FM and WSUI 910 AM) reach Cedar Rapids.

=== Television ===
The Cedar Rapids-Waterloo-Iowa City-Dubuque media market consists of 21 eastern Iowa counties: Allamakee, Benton, Black Hawk, Bremer, Buchanan, Butler, Cedar, Chickasaw, Clayton, Delaware, Dubuque, Fayette, Grundy, Iowa, Johnson, Jones, Keokuk, Linn, Tama, Washington, and Winneshiek. It is ranked 90th by Nielsen Media Research for the 2016–17 television season with 346,330 television households.

Cedar Rapids is home to the following commercial stations: KGAN channel 2 (CBS), KGAN-DT2 (Fox), KCRG-TV channel 9 (ABC), KCRG-DT2 (MyNetworkTV), KCRG-DT3 (The CW), KFXA channel 28 (Roar), and KPXR-TV channel 48 (Ion). NBC affiliate KWWL channel 7 and MeTV affiliate KWWL-DT3 are based in Waterloo and maintain a newsroom inside the Alliant Energy tower in downtown Cedar Rapids. Other stations in the market are KWKB channel 20 (TCT, ThisTV on DT-5), licensed to Iowa City and KFXB-TV channel 40 (CTN), licensed to Dubuque. Public television is provided by Iowa PBS, which has two stations in the area: KIIN channel 12 in Iowa City and KRIN channel 32 in Waterloo. KWWF channel 22 (RTN), which operated from Waterloo, ceased broadcasting in 2013. Mediacom and local company ImOn Communications provide cable television service to Cedar Rapids.

=== Print ===
The Gazette is the primary daily newspaper for Cedar Rapids. The Cedar Rapids Gazette won a Pulitzer Prize in 1936, under editor Verne Marshall and primarily due to his efforts and articles, for its campaign against corruption and misgovernment in the State of Iowa.

=== Film ===
Cedar Rapids is an American comedy film about a naive insurance agent, played by Ed Helms, who is sent to represent his company at a regional conference in big town Cedar Rapids. Although the film is set in Cedar Rapids, it was actually mostly shot in Ann Arbor, Michigan, although exterior shots were done in Cedar Rapids.

The 2017 film Amelia 2.0 is a scifi drama set in a nameless fictional city. The majority of the movie was filmed in Cedar Rapids, using iconic locations such as the Cedar Rapids Public Library and Theater Cedar Rapids as important set pieces.

The Crazies is a 2010 film set near Cedar Rapids in the fictional Odgen Marsh, Iowa. Bruce Aune, a real newscaster from KCRG-TV 9 in Cedar Rapids, appears in a mid-credits scene near the end of the film.

The Final Season is a 2007 film about the Norway High School baseball team's pursuit of their 20th state championship and the district's fight against consolidation. The film includes footage of the Kennedy High School baseball field, the new Cedar Rapids Kernels baseball stadium, and an appearance by former KZIA-FM Cedar Rapids radio personalities Scott Schulte and the late Ric Swann.

== Infrastructure ==
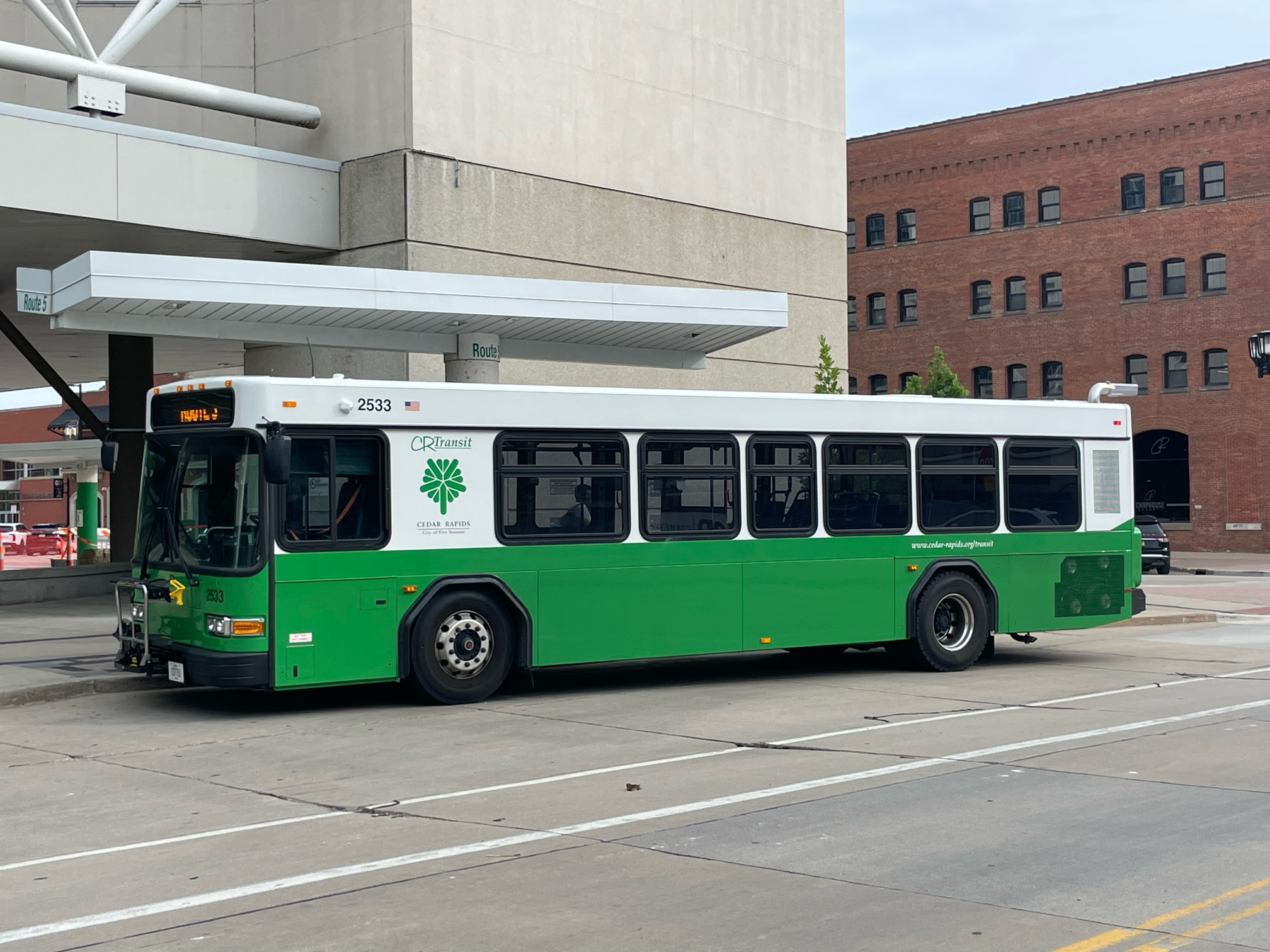
Cedar Rapids Transit bus

=== Transportation ===
Cedar Rapids is served by Cedar Rapids Transit, consisting of an extensive bus system and taxi service. Cedar Rapids Transit operates scheduled bus service throughout the city and to Marion and Hiawatha. The 380 Express provides commuter bus service from Cedar Rapids to Coralville and Iowa City.

A series of enclosed pedestrian skywalks connect several downtown buildings.

The city is also served by the Eastern Iowa Airport (formerly known as the Cedar Rapids Airport), a regional airport that connects with other regional and international airports. Cedar Rapids Transit and private bus lines also connect at the airport.

I-380, part of the Avenue of the Saints, runs north–south through Cedar Rapids. U.S. Highways 30, 151, and 218 and Iowa 13 and Iowa 100 also serve the city.

Cedar Rapids is served by four major railroads. They are the Union Pacific, the Cedar Rapids and Iowa City Railway (Crandic), the Canadian National, and the Iowa Northern Railway Company [IANR]. The Iowa Northern Railway has its headquarters in the historic Paramount Theater Building. The Crandic and the Iowa Interstate Railroad also are headquartered in Cedar Rapids. The Iowa Interstate reaches the city via the Crandic tracks, running a daily train from Iowa City, Iowa to Cedar Rapids. Until the 1960s the city had been a major hub for passenger trains. Union Station and Milwaukee Depot served the city, with trains originating in all directions from major cities of the West and the Midwest. Passenger service by the Milwaukee Road continued to neighboring Marion until 1971.

Cedar Rapids is linked to other Midwestern cities by the Burlington Trailways bus hub at the Eastern Iowa Airport.

=== Health care ===
There are two hospitals in Cedar Rapids: St. Luke's and Mercy Medical Center.

=== Energy ===
From 1975 until 2020 Iowa's only nuclear plant, the Duane Arnold Energy Center provided electricity. In 2025 NextEra Energy Resources prepared to relicense the plant to restart it by 2028 given the expected increasing demand by data centers.

== See also ==
- List of people from Cedar Rapids, Iowa
- National Register of Historic Places listings in Linn County, Iowa
- Cedar Rapids Police Department
