= Veterans Memorial Building (American Fork, Utah) =

- U.S. National Register of Historic Places
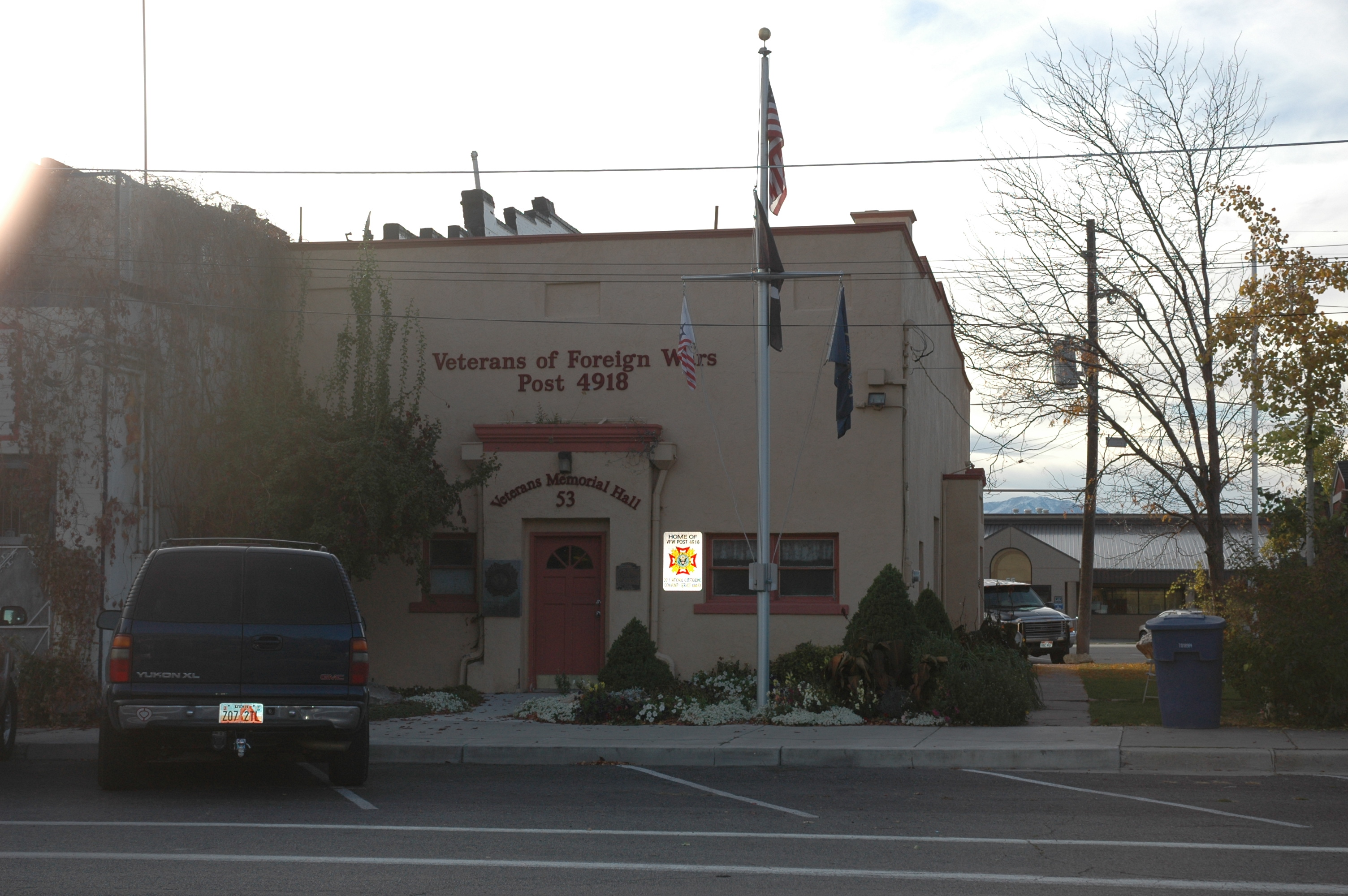
- The building now houses a VFW post.

- Location within Utah Location within the United States
- Location: 53 N. Center, American Fork, Utah
- Coordinates: 40°22′41″N 111°47′54″W
- Area: less than one acre
- Built: 1934
- Architect: Wright, Glen
- Architectural style: Moderne
- NRHP reference No.: 94000299
- Added to NRHP: April 14, 1994

The Veterans Memorial Building at 53 N. Center in American Fork, Utah was built in 1934. It has also been known as American Fork Legion Hall and as Legion Memorial Building. It was listed on the National Register of Historic Places in 1994.
