= Mays Island =

- May’s Island Historic District
- U.S. National Register of Historic Places
- U.S. Historic district
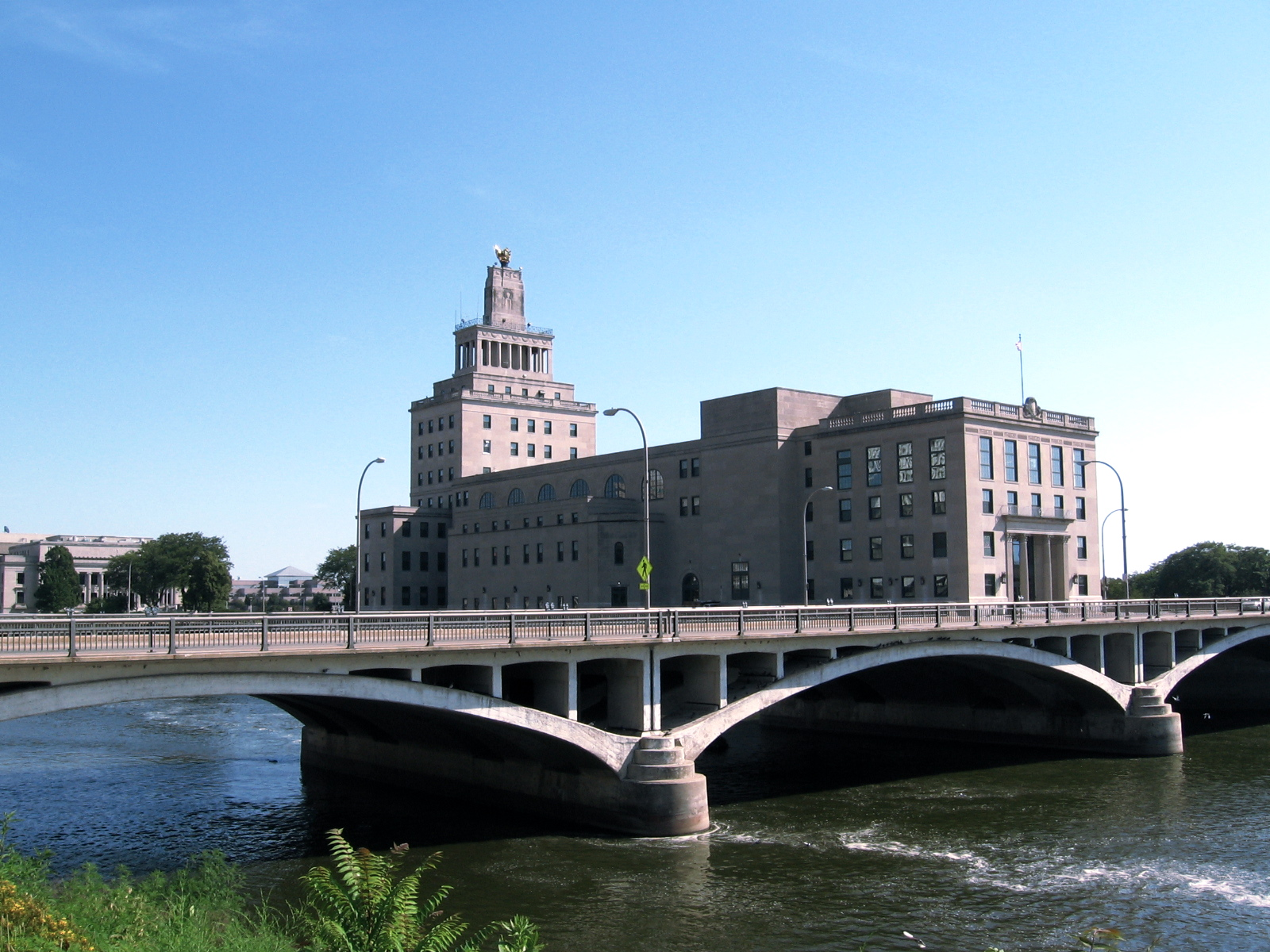

- Location within Iowa Location within the United States
- Location: Between 1st and 5th Aves. on May Island, Cedar Rapids, Iowa
- Coordinates: 41°58′33″N 91°40′13″W
- Built: 1923;1927;1933
- Architect: Hunter & Hatton; Joseph Royer; Office of the Supervising Architect under James A. Wetmore
- Architectural style: Beaux Arts
- NRHP reference No.: 78001240
- Added to NRHP: October 19, 1978

May's Island (or Mays Island) is a small island on the Cedar River, in Cedar Rapids, Iowa. Functioning as a civic center much like the Île de la Cité, it is the site of the Memorial Building (the city hall), the Linn County Courthouse, and the county jail. The island plus an adjacent block was listed as a historic district on the National Register of Historic Places in 1978.

The island and all of its buildings were devastated by the 2008 flood of the Cedar River, with water reaching above the first floors.

Until the 2008 flood, the concentration of local and county government on the island served to unify the city on both sides. The Memorial Building was designed by Hunter & Hatton, architects of Cedar Rapids. The Beaux Arts-style Linn County Courthouse was designed by Joseph Royer, as was the county jail. The building masses are long and narrow, like the island itself. The buildings face each other, creating an "insular quality".

The concentration of government services extends to the east bank, where the Federal government is located, to the east of the Memorial Building, in the Beaux Arts-style Federal Building, whose design is credited to the Office of the Supervising Architect under James A. Wetmore. Its block, from 1st Avenue north to 2nd Avenue, from 1st Street west to the river, is also included in the historic district. This makes a total of four contributing buildings in the district.

== History ==
Before Cedar Rapids was incorporated, May's Island was a low, marshy piece of land in the Cedar River (then called the Red Cedar), prone to flooding and covered with scrubby brush and trees. Because of the undergrowth and its inaccessibility, it was reputedly used by local horse thieves as a spot to temporarily hide their loot. In the 1850s, an entrepreneur/dreamer by the name of "Major" John May managed to acquire the island. (May had been granted the title for some service to the governor of New York and he always used it thereafter; interestingly, though, when called up to actually fight during the Civil War, he paid another man to serve in his stead). May was also into real estate speculation, and when he learned that the island had not been included in official government surveys of the city, he managed to get the government to recognize its existence and then sell it to him.

His original dream was to start a town called May Island (about the same time he started another town, called Mayfield, south of Cedar Rapids), but that plan quickly proved unworkable due to the island's tendency to flood and due to its inaccessibility—there were still no bridges across the Cedar. Undaunted, May came up with a new vision for his island: it would become the heart of an enlarged Cedar Rapids that straddled the river (at that time Cedar Rapids was confined to the east bank of the Cedar; there was a separate town called Kingston on the west). To this end, he persuaded the Iowa State Legislature to rename Kingston "West Cedar Rapids," thereby planting the idea that the two towns were really just two halves of a greater whole. May then left Cedar Rapids to pursue ventures elsewhere, but returned to check on his investment periodically. He returned to Cedar Rapids for good in 1871 to find fortune had smiled on his island: Cedar Rapids had annexed West Cedar Rapids/Kingston and had constructed an iron bridge to unite the two halves of the newly enlarged city—this bridge, along the line of the current third avenue bridge, cut directly through the middle of May's Island, and remained the only operable bridge for the next 14 years. May's vision had been realized, and businesses began popping up along the new thoroughfare.

In 1889, a Russian immigrant named Henry Smulekoff purchased one of these buildings and opened a furniture store (Smulekoff's Furniture would operate in Cedar Rapids until 2014), then gradually bought up more and more of the island as Major May's fortunes fell into decline. John May died in 1904, but by that time there was already a movement afoot to have the city acquire the island as the site for City Hall. Then, as now, there were ill feelings between the east- and west-siders in Cedar Rapids, and the city's leaders hoped that placing the seat of government in the "neutral territory" of May's Island would help ease the tensions. It was Smulekoff who sold most of the island to the City in 1909, including his store, which became the temporary new home of City Hall. The city began remaking the island, building concrete sea walls and raising its elevation to end the perpetual problem of flooding (or so they thought: May's Island was again under water during the 2008 flood). They also extended the island to the north, increasing its size by about a third. Originally, the island only extended to what is now Second Avenue; the portion where Veterans Memorial Building is situated is entirely man-made. In 1919, the residents of Linn County, Iowa voted to move the county seat from Marion, Iowa to Cedar Rapids, in part because Cedar Rapids had offered to donate the southern third of the island for use as a county courthouse and jail. The city officially renamed the island "Municipal Island" but, though there are no signs identifying it as such, residents of Cedar Rapids still know it as "May's Island."
