= Veterans Memorial Building (Cedar Rapids, Iowa) =

- U.S. Historic district – Contributing property
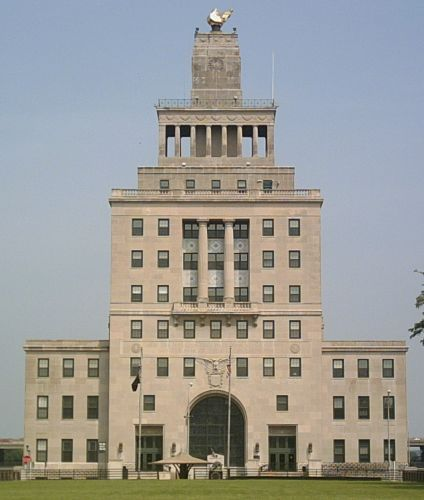

- Location within Iowa
- Location: May’s Island, Cedar Rapids, Iowa
- Coordinates: 41°58′54″N 91°40′10″W
- Architect: William J. Brown and Harry E. Hunter, with consulting architect Henry Hornbostel
- Architectural style: Beaux Arts
- Part of: May's Island Historic District (ID78001240)
- Added to NRHP: October 19, 1978

The Veteran's Memorial Building is located on May's Island in the middle of the Cedar River in Cedar Rapids, Iowa, United States. It is a contributing property to the May's Island Historic District that was listed on the National Register of Historic Places in 1978. The building served as the Cedar Rapids City Hall until it was damaged in the Flood of 2008. The Building underwent a ribbon-cutting ceremony to mark its official re-opening April 15, 2014.

== History ==
A petition to construct a memorial building was filed with the City Clerk on March 4, 1925. Over 40 civic organizations were involved in planning for the structure. Voters passed a bond referendum and a Veterans Memorial Commission was formed. Construction was completed in 1927.

Plans were drawn and the building was placed on May's Island. In order to make the building financially feasible, a new city hall was incorporated into the plans. Cedar Rapids, after Paris, France's Hôtel de Ville on the Île de la Cité, and Osaka, Japan, would be only one of three cities to have its government located on an island. The building also contains a Memorial Window, Memorial Auditorium and a Tomb of the Unknown Soldier. The building was designed in the Beaux-Arts style. The main portion of the building contains four stories, with an eight-story section in the front. A cenotaph tops the eight-story section. The auditorium contains seven banners from veterans' organizations, and seven American flags were suspended from the ceiling. A Tomb of the Unknown Soldier is located above the cenotaph.

The first addition to the building was a statue of the raising of the flag at Iwo Jima, which was placed on the front steps in 1960. It is a memorial to veterans of World War II and the Korean War. The Veterans Memorial Commission added a museum in 1966, which contains items from the American Revolution through the Vietnam War. The museum was dedicated as a memorial to the Spanish–American War. A granite monument memorializes those who served in the Vietnam War. In 2000 an eternal flame was lit on top of the building.

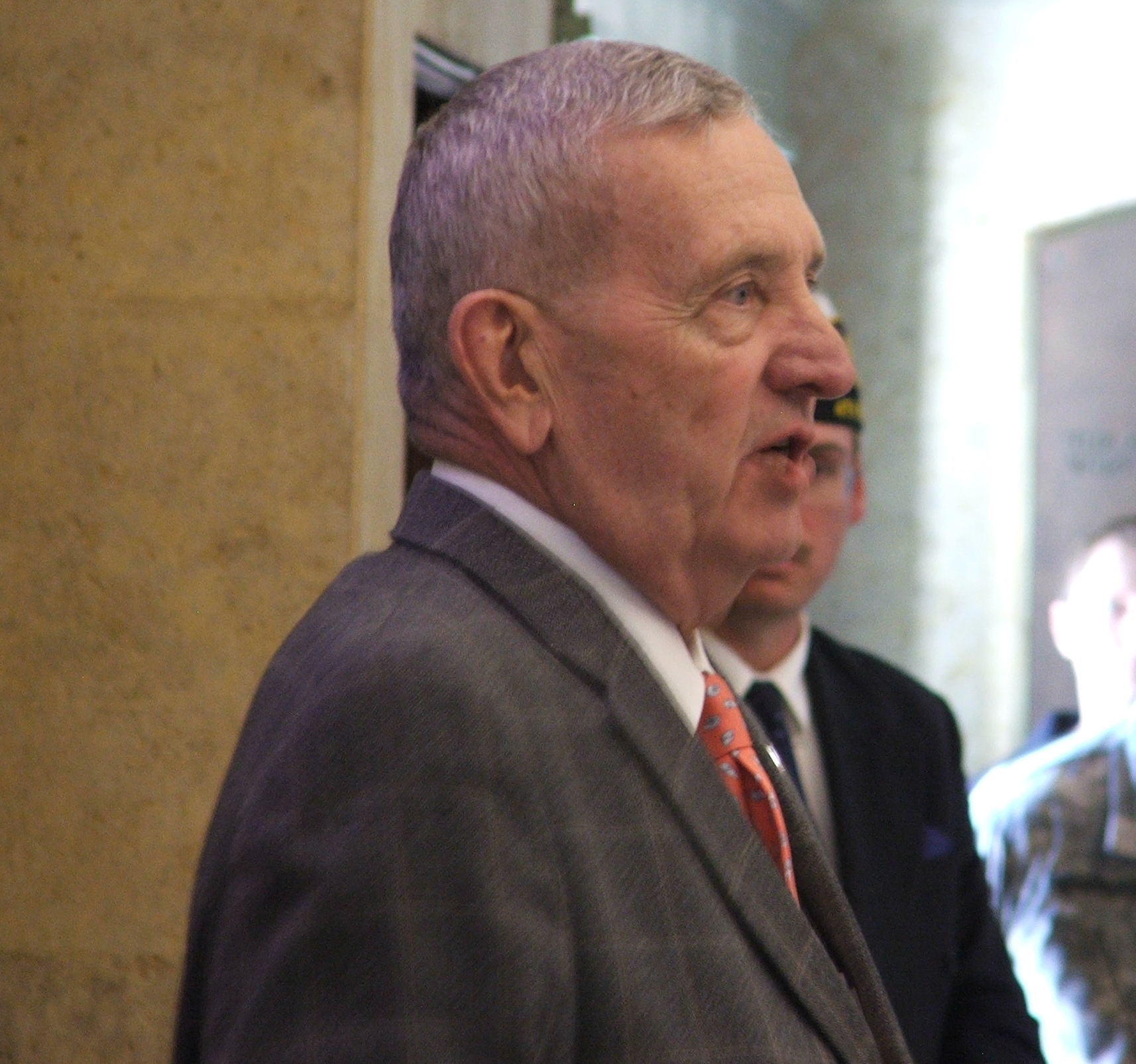
GEN Tommy Franks speaking at the Veterans Memorial Building April 15, 2014

The buildings sustained damage as a result of the 2008 flood. As a result, the city government was forced to leave the building. In the aftermath the city decided to move the city offices to the former Federal Courthouse. The city was able to take possession of the building after it provided the land for a new courthouse downtown. The City Council began holding its meetings in the former courthouse on June 26, 2011, and the facility was opened for public use on June 4, 2012.

The Veterans Memorial Building now hosts and rents out its facilities for weddings, fundraisers, and other event rentals. The building is also home to various tenants and offers meeting spaces to many Veteran's organizations and clubs. http://cms.revize.com/revize/cedarrapids/local_government/departments_g_-_v/veterans_memorial_commission/vmb_rental_information.php

== Memorial window ==
Regionalist artist Grant Wood, who grew up and lived in Cedar Rapids as an adult, was commissioned to design the memorial window. The window measures 24 by 20 feet (7.3 by 6.1 m). It is the only stained glass window designed by Wood. It depicts a 16 feet (4.9 m) Lady of Peace and Victory in the clouds. She wears a Grecian robe and a blue mourning veil and holds a palm branch for peace in one hand and a wreath for victory in the other. The artist's sister Nan was the model for the Lady of Peace and Victory. Across the bottom are six 6 feet (1.8 m) tall soldiers representing the American Revolution, War of 1812, Mexican–American War, American Civil War, Spanish–American War, and World War I.

The window deteriorated somewhat over the years, and it was damaged in the 2008 flood. Glass Heritage of Davenport, Iowa, restored the window for $150,000. It was re-dedicated on July 4, 2010.
