= Old Capitol Mall =

Old Capitol Town Center
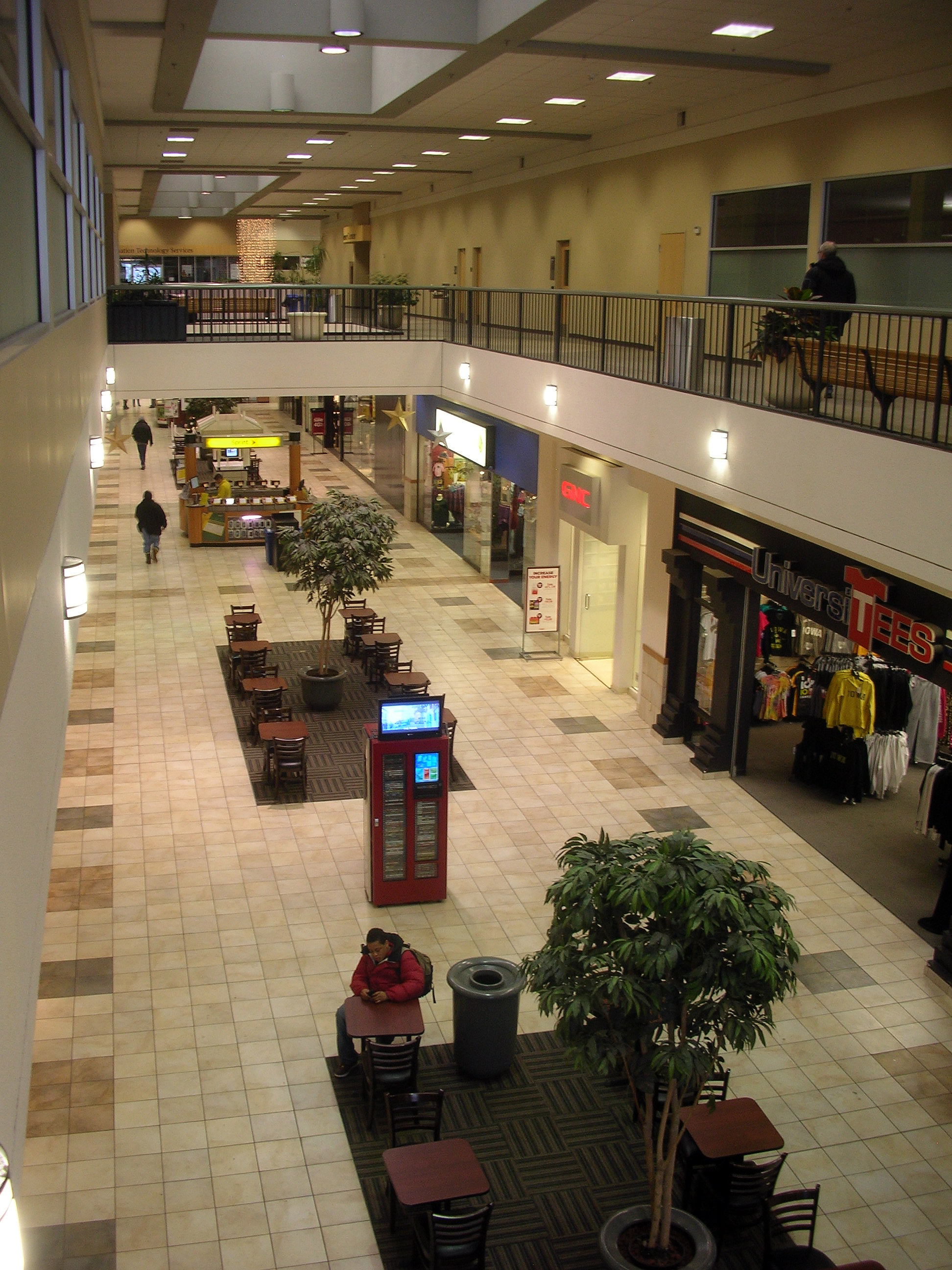
- The Old Capitol Mall in 2010
- Location: Iowa City, Iowa
- Coordinates: 41.659°N 91.535°W
- Address: 201 S Clinton St, 52240
- Opened: 1981, Specific date unknown
- Previous names: Old Capitol Center (1981-1995), Old Capitol Mall (1995-2000)
- Owner: University of Iowa
- Floor area: 276,215 square feet
- Floors: 2 floors
- Parking: Adjoined parking ramp contains 875 parking bays
- Public transit: Iowa City Transit
- Website: Old Capitol Town Center's official web site

The Old Capitol Mall (now Old Capitol Town Center) is a shopping mall in the downtown area of Iowa City, Iowa. Located across the street from the south-east corner of the Pentacrest (a four-block-sized parcel of land with a collection of five buildings with the old Iowa Territory capitol in the middle), the Old Capitol Mall was a convenient shopping center for University of Iowa students, faculty, and staff. It was originally anchored by JCPenney and Younkers, and over 70 stores. In July 1998, JCPenney and other stores moved to larger Coral Ridge Mall and divided into smaller stores. In 2004, Younkers closed.

The Mall saw decreasing traffic after the opening of the Coral Ridge Mall in the adjacent town of Coralville, Iowa. Many major retailers opted to focus on their Coral Ridge locations and close their low-performing Old Capitol locations. While some stores and restaurants still exist in the Old Capitol Mall, other spaces have been used by newspaper offices, the University of Iowa, or various political parties. The University of Iowa has largely taken over this building.

== History ==
Before the construction of the Old Capitol Center in 1981, the lot was already home to several buildings. As of 1933, four different grocery stores were located on the lot that would be the Old Capitol Center. These grocery stores were the Economy Cash Store (101 S. Clinton Street), Great A & P Tea Company (117 S. Clinton Street), Butcher Bros. Grocery (123 S. Clinton Street), and Joseph Glassman's Cash Grocery (131 S. Clinton Street). At 9 West Washington St. (directly south of Schaeffer Hall on the University Square), sat the three-story Burkley Imperial hotel owned by Frank P. Burkley. However, during the 1970s, when the urban renewal wave hit Iowa City, it was demolished to make room for the new Old Capitol Center.

=== 1980s ===
During its inaugural year, 1981, the mall opened under its original name the Old Capitol Center. Upon its opening, the anchor stores included JCPenney and Younkers. On the first floor, the stores at the time of its opening included Foot Locker, Zales, B. Dalton, Musicland (which later renamed to Sam Goody), and Claire's Boutique. On the second floor, the mall had the video arcade Aladdin's Castle. The mall also featured a movie theater and an Orange Julius.

=== 1990s ===
In 1995, the mall would officially change its names to the Old Capitol Mall.

In 1998, the Coral Ridge Mall would open in the adjacent town of Coralville, Iowa, and with its opening, many free parking spots were available around the mall. Due to its location in the Iowa City Downtown Historic District, the Old Capitol Mall was not able to include very much free parking around it. With the opening of the Coral Ridge Mall, JCPenney moved its location and Younkers opened another location. With the opening of the new mall and its free parking, many of the retailers in the Old Capitol Mall began relocating their stores as shoppers started spending more time in the Coral Ridge Mall.

=== 2000s ===
In 2000, the mall would rename to its current name, the Old Capitol Town Center. In 2003, the mall was saved from going bankrupt when several local investors within the Iowa City are got involved.

In 2002, UniversiTEES opens in the Old Capitol Town Center.

Following the Bankruptcy scare, the University of Iowa began taking an interest in the building due to its location relative to the University's campus. Between the years of 2006 and 2009, the University of Iowa had purchased 55 percent (207,000 square feet) of the mall in three phases.

During the Iowa flood of 2008, the building helped house the operations of the Voxman School of Music and the Iowa Memorial Union, both of which were destroyed. Located within the Iowa Memorial Union was the Iowa Hawk Shop, a University of Iowa memorabilia store, also moved into the Old Capitol Mall due to its destruction during the flood.

=== 2010s ===
In 2015, the reconstruction of the Iowa Memorial Union was completed seven years after the Iowa flood of 2008. Following its completion, the Iowa Hawk Shop moved its location back into the Union. In the same year, the University of Iowa Quickcare expanded its presence within the Old Capitol Mall, consuming a unit located next to the Blick Art Materials store which was previously occupied by a Bank of West branch.

In 2016, UniversiTEES permanently shut down operations within the mall.

In December of 2016, the Old Capitol Town Center hosted the Iowa City Winter Market, which included music, food, and hosted a variety of small businesses.

=== 2020s ===
On January 7, 2020, the University of Iowa moved its Office of Student Financial Aid into a space that was originally occupied by the University's College of Public Health. Later in the year, the University of Iowa also moved its Student Disability Services office into the mall after a petition reach more than 3,000 signatures and due to it being a more accessible location.

On August 27, 2024, Raising Cane's Chicken Fingers opened its first location in Iowa City in the unit previously occupied by Freddy's Frozen Custard & Steakburgers.

Since the University of Iowa's purchase of 55 percent of the Old Capitol Town Center, has begun to acquire the rest of the building. On November 6, 2024, the University of Iowa requested approval from the Iowa Board of Regents to purchase the remaining 45 percent of the building. The purchase of the rest of the mall was originally presented in January 2022, as part of the University's ten year master plan for their facilities. When the purchase of the remaining 45 percent was approved, the University paid 20.6 million dollars, with 10 percent of the total being paid immediately and the remaining 90 percent to be paid by October 1st, 2027.

== Features ==
The Old Capitol Town Center is connected to the Capitol Street Parking Ramp (220 S. Capitol Street). The parking ramp contains 875 parking spaces and offers a free first hour of parking, with each additional hour costing $2 per hour. The ground floor of the parking garage also contains a bicycle parking rack and fourteen moped/motorcycle parking spaces, both of which are located to the left of the ramp's ingress. The Old Capitol Town Center and the Capitol Street Parking ramp are connected together through an elevator tower on the tower's ground floor. The tower contains two elevators and a staircase. Through this tower, it is also possible to access the University of Iowa's department of Campus Safety, which is in the basement of the Old Capitol Town Center.

The Old Capitol Town Center features two floors, with the first floor being primarily occupied by shops and restaurants. The second floor is occupied by various University of Iowa offices. Access to the second floor can be done through the elevator tower, the escalators near the north entrance or west entrance of the building, or one of the various staircases located throughout the building.
