= Iowa flood of 2008 =

Natural Disaster (flood) in Iowa, US from June 8 – July 1, 2008

Iowa Flood of 2008
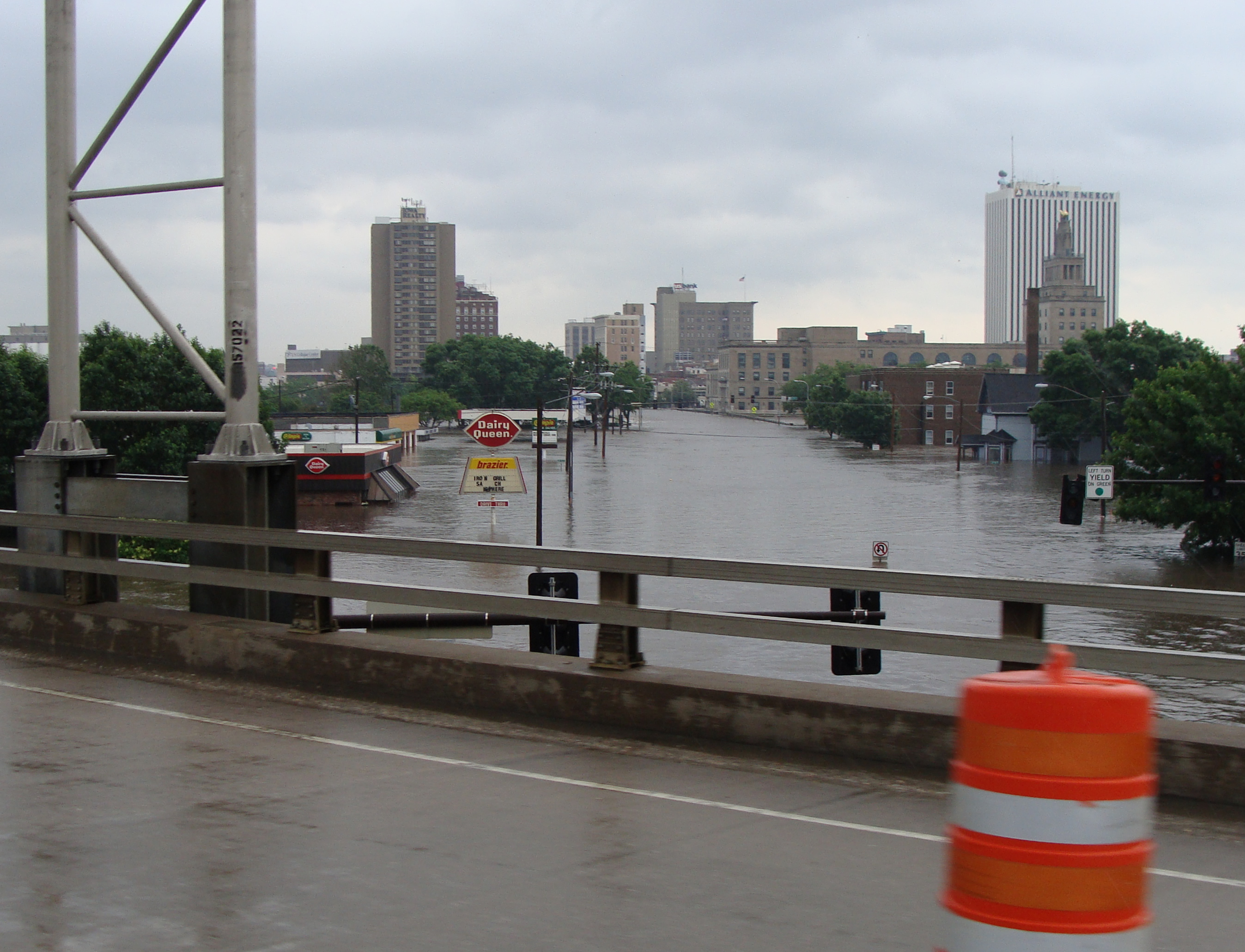
- Looking towards downtown Cedar Rapids, Iowa, on June 12

Meteorological history
- Duration: June 7 – around July 1

Overall effects
- Damage: $6 billion

The Iowa flood of 2008 was a hydrological event involving most of the rivers in eastern Iowa which began June 8 and continued until July 1. Flooding continued on the Upper Mississippi River in the southeastern area of the state for many more days. The phrase "Iowa's Katrina" was often heard.

The flooding included (from north to south, east to west), the Upper Iowa River, Turkey, and the Maquoketa Rivers; outside of the Driftless Area, they include the catchments of the Wapsipinicon River and that of the Iowa River, to include the latter's major tributary, the Cedar River (and its significant tributaries); and the Skunk River in its various forks. The Des Moines River had some minor flooding, but floodwalls and levees, for the most part, held fast. The Upper Mississippi River, which receives the outflow from all these rivers, remained at the flood stage.

The flooding of Cedar Rapids and Iowa City were the most significant events. Recovery, in particular for Cedar Rapids, was considered to be a protracted and costly affair. For Iowa City, the level of damage was less than expected, however, the damage to Cedar Rapids was greater than anticipated. In Iowa City, the campus of the University of Iowa was vulnerable and serious flooding occurred.

President George W. Bush landed on Air Force One at the Eastern Iowa Airport on June 20. He toured on foot and by helicopter in the Cedar Rapids and Iowa City region. On the same day, Senator John McCain made a stop in Columbus Junction.

== Origins ==
State Meteorologist Elwynn Taylor of Iowa State University commented that the wet spring of 2008 was traceable to relatively warm and wet air during the winter season. Taylor explained: Fog in the winter is normally the result of a strong flow of warm, moist air from the Gulf of Mexico, which normally does not occur in the winter," he said. "Usually that occurs in March and April. It's caused by either low pressure over New Mexico or high pressure over Bermuda. Both are common in the summer. Both are rare in the winter. More than 80 percent of moisture that falls in the Midwest is from the Gulf of Mexico, and the primary cause of it coming here is the Bermuda high pressure. The pressure arrived very early and much stronger than usual by April and May this year. And it was the case in 1993."

Taylor was quoted at length in the article, concluding: "[The] Rule of thumb is, if a storm begins in the Texas Panhandle, it will come to Iowa. The conditions that allow a storm to develop there are the conditions that move the storm to Iowa."

The 2007–2008 winter was particularly severe in northeast Iowa, with a heavy snow cover that persisted in many areas until the early spring rains. From the last week in April, the state experienced heavy rain, particularly in the form of thunderstorms, which saturated the soils. It was an extension of the Late-May 2008 tornado outbreak sequence, which, aside from record-setting tornadoes, also brought huge quantities of rain in the form of stalled thunderstorm systems.

Another possible contributing factor was the extensive field tiling (installation of drain tiles) in Iowa. Almost 40% of agricultural fields in Iowa are tiled, which allows water to flow more quickly from fields into waterways, possibly causing water levels to rise faster.

Also, farming closer to creeks and rivers without adequate buffer strips allows the water to move rapidly from the field directly to the surface water.

== Effects ==
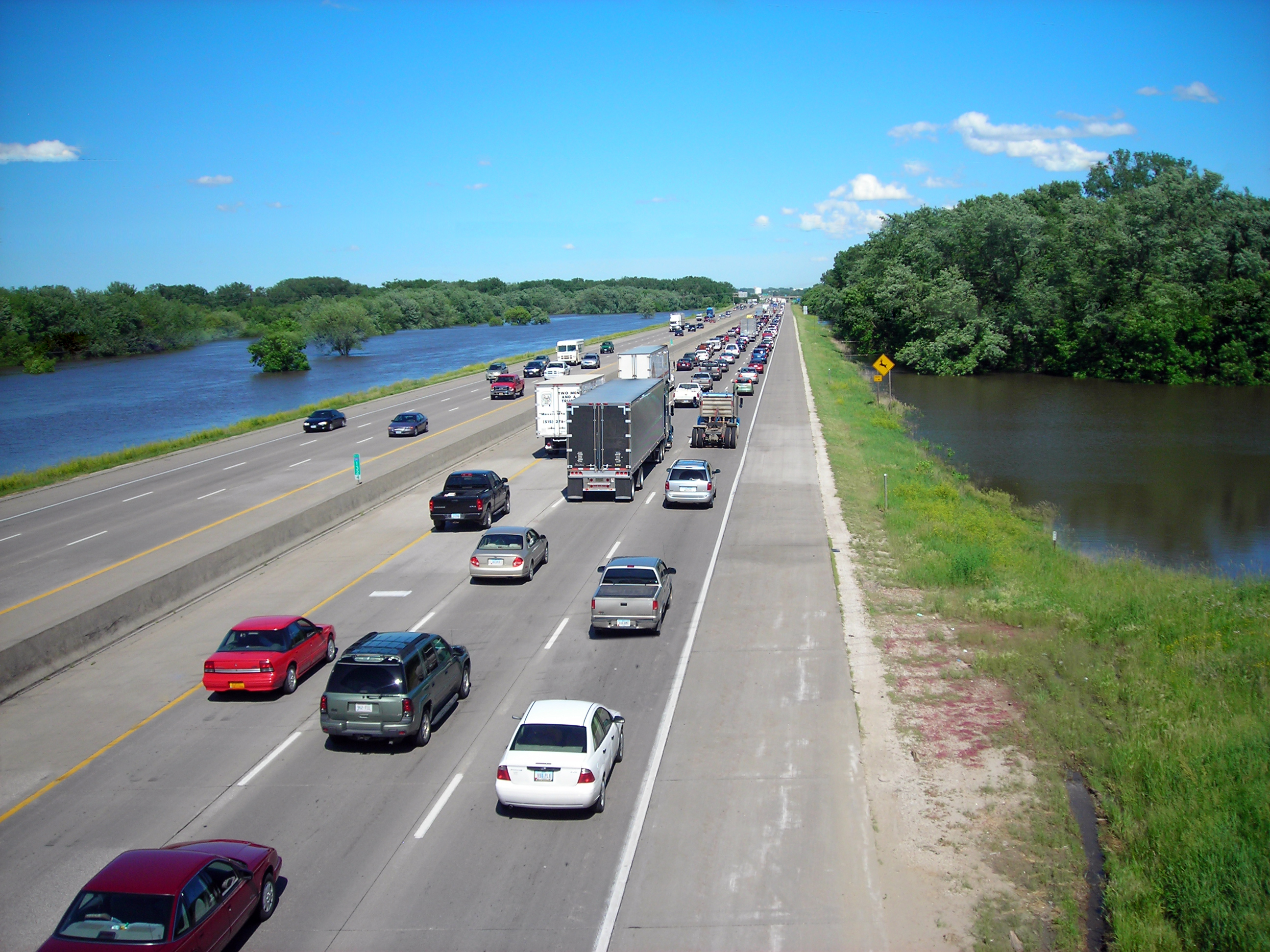
Floodwaters fill the ditches surrounding Interstate 80 in Des Moines

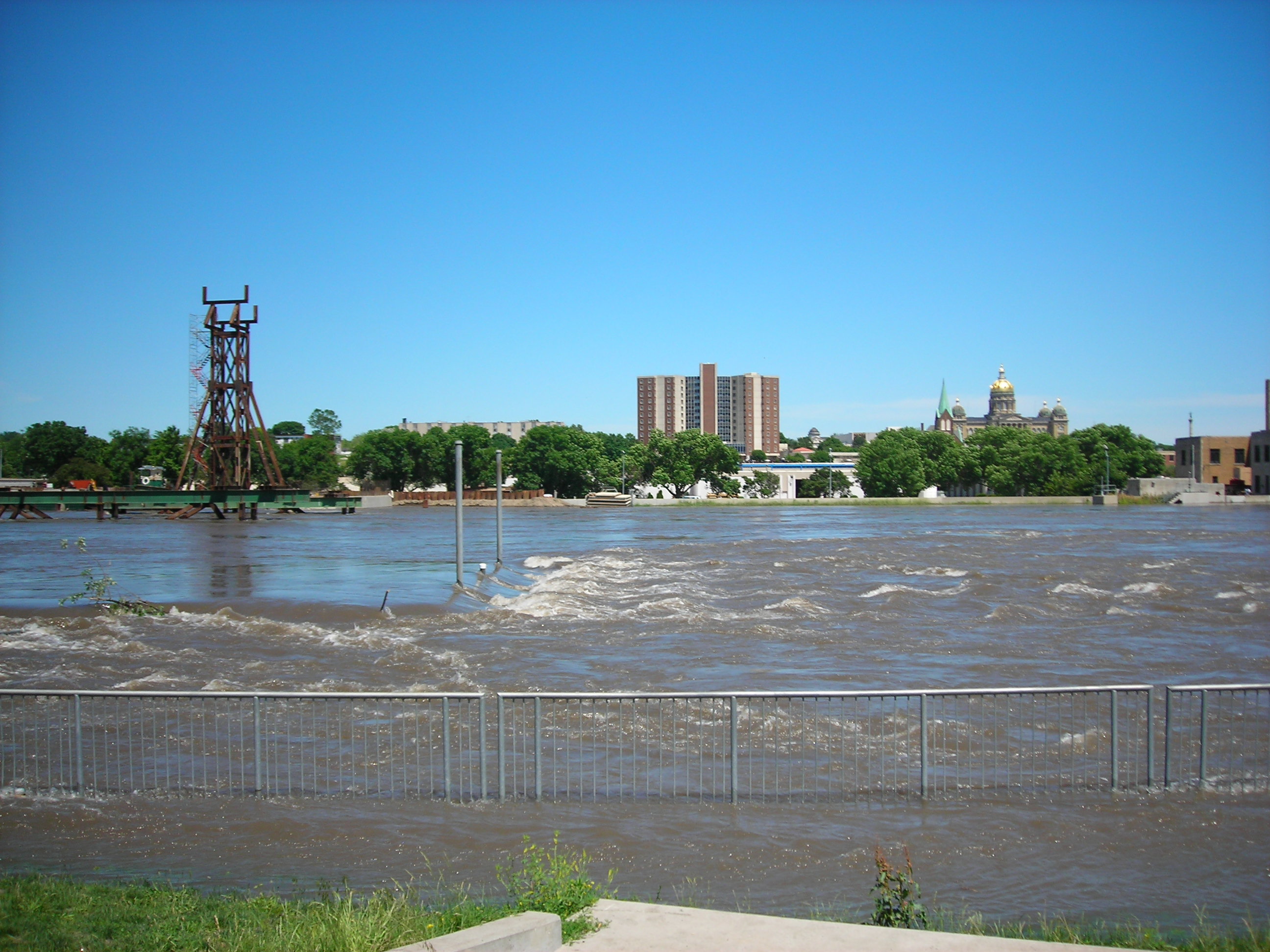
The Des Moines River threatened downtown businesses and prompted officials to call for a voluntary evacuation

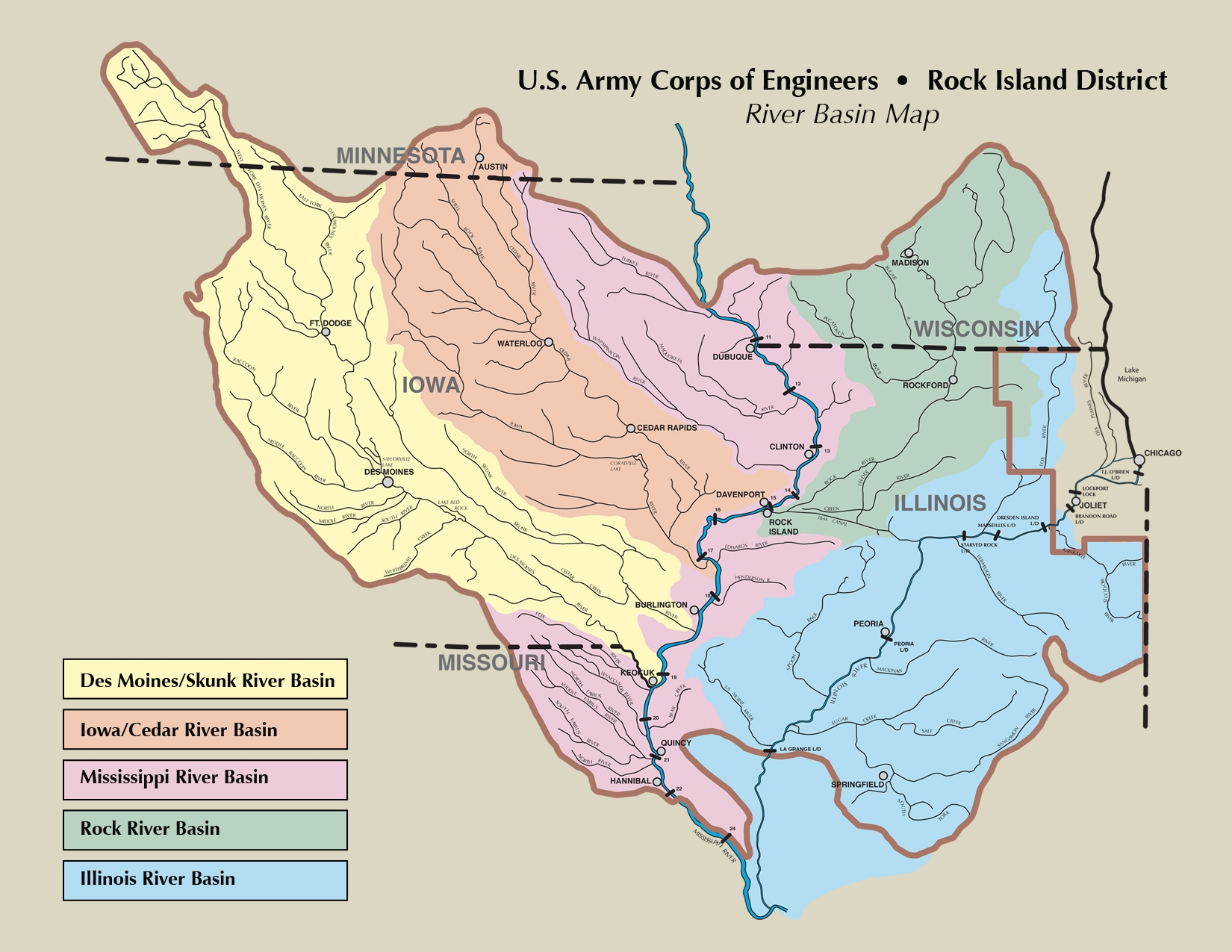
Map of affected watersheds (this includes the Illinois River but excludes the Upper Iowa)

While the Great Flood of 1993 was greater in continental terms, in local Iowa terms, the June 2008 Midwest floods were considerably worse. The lessons learned in 1993, however, helped prevent or otherwise mitigate damage, extensive as it was; one example is how the city of Des Moines raised its levee around its domestic water and sewage treatment plants. The extent of flooding in 2008 was probably less than during the Flood of 1851, but it is difficult to compare the impacts of the two floods because of changes in population, economy, and land use. A study performed by Mark Burton at the University of Tennessee and Michael J. Hicks at Ball State University was based on post 1993 flood data. However, the 2008 floods damaged key infrastructure outside of the model (e.g., the University of Iowa library) due both to changes in population and flood protection measures. However, the Burton & Hicks study did identify crop damages at roughly $3 billion, which turned out to be very close to the actual damages.

The flooding led to many homes being evacuated. In eastern Iowa along the Iowa River and Cedar River, flooding exceeded that of the Flood of 1993.

Flooding had also forced the closure of an extensive number of roads throughout the eastern half of the state, a situation that affected far more people than those who directly experienced the floods; in particular, portions of Interstate 80 and I-380 were closed. The closure of bridges in Waterloo, Cedar Rapids and Iowa City disrupted usual traffic patterns, and especially led to extensive detours.

Rail traffic was also seriously affected. The Iowa, Chicago and Eastern Railroad (IC&E Railroad) had a washout between Mason City and Nora Springs. The Cedar Rapids and Iowa City Railway Co. (CRANDIC/CIC) was particularly affected; its bridge in Cedar Rapids was destroyed by the flooding while an embankment downriver near Coralville was also washed out. The Keokuk Junction Railway (KJRY) also reported disruptions. Amtrak service was rerouted, away from Iowa; a number of trains had their passengers put onto buses.

=== Restoration of Amtrak service ===
Amtrak's California Zephyr service (from Chicago) was suspended in Iowa due to substantial flooding. Because of the widespread flooding in Iowa, no detours were available and passengers were moved by motor coaches during the interim. The affected railways were owned by IC&E and BNSF. Service was projected to resume on July 5, 2008, for the California Zephyr. The two other routes previously closed by flooding resumed service on July 1.

== Upper Iowa River ==
=== Decorah ===
On Monday, June 9 the Upper Iowa River in Decorah flooded when a shorter college-built levee was breached. The Army Corps of Engineers levee held in all parts of Decorah. Up to 6 inches (152 mm) of rain had fallen in the 48 hours prior. The water flooded parts of the lower campus of Luther College, damaging athletic fields and the Regents Center. Winneshiek County officials described this flooding as the worst to occur in Decorah since the current levee system was put in place in the 1940s. Other portions of the city were flooded. Part of the city was evacuated. For a time, worries of losing the sanitary sewer system led to a 'please don't flush' order; as of Friday, June 13, 2008, this order was withdrawn, but pleas for careful use remained in effect. This article also alludes to a difficult cleanup that faced Decorah as well as Winneshiek County.

=== Dorchester ===
Further downstream on the Upper Iowa, in the small historic unincorporated area of Dorchester, located on the left bank of the Waterloo Creek, severe flooding was experienced. In particular, a trailer court sustained major damage.

The flood began in the early morning of Sunday, June 8; residents were advised to evacuate that Saturday evening. Approximately seven to ten inches (180 to 250 mm) of rain fell in the area that Saturday. The main contributor was Waterloo Creek, a normally placid trout stream tributary to the Upper Iowa at Dorchester. The Eitzen, Minnesota Fire Department responded to the flood. Cleanup and recovery occurred during the aftermath.

== Turkey River ==
=== Spillville and Fort Atkinson ===
Along the upper Turkey River, the historic towns of Spillville and Fort Atkinson experienced significant flooding as seen with damaged roads. In particular, the one-year-old bridge carrying Iowa Highway 24 had its approach on one side of the river washed out by floodwaters.

=== Elkader ===
Further downstream in Elkader, the river crested in the morning on Tuesday, June 10 at nearly 31 feet (9.4 m), besting the previous record set in 1991. The river had retreated by Thursday, June 12

By June 16, most of the water had been pumped out of buildings. "At least 20 homes were destroyed and nine suffered major damage", said Randy Frank from the Clayton County Emergency Management Office.

Damages were initially estimated to be in the range of $8 million, of which about $3.7 million in damage to the city's infrastructure; these figures were expected to rise. About 100 people evacuated.

== Maquoketa River ==
In the Maquoketa's upper area, Monticello experienced high water.

=== Manchester ===
Beginning in early May, Manchester endured a series of floods, with a total of 24 inches (610 mm) of rain over the period. The downtown area was flooded at least four times. Supersaturated soil led to basement flooding.

== Wapsipinicon River ==
=== Independence ===
Independence experienced flooding in low-lying areas.

=== Anamosa ===
A levee breach occurred in Anamosa on Thursday, June 12. While the flooding was not extensive, it nonetheless knocked out the city's sewer treatment facility. The Wapsi crested at 18.25 feet (5.56 m), breaking the older record of 16 feet (4.9 m) in 1999.

The cost of putting the sewer system back to full function was $3 million; initial filtering, however, was expected to come back on line by the second week of August.

=== Olin and Oxford Junction ===
Oxford Junction managed to protect its water plant as well as the American Legion hall. Upriver, Olin suffered flooding in low-lying areas but the waters receded by June 15.

Olin sustained about $80,000 in damage. At least 80 homes sustained damage.

With Oxford Junction, the nearby Cooksville area had about 30 homes evacuated. The city sustained damage to the road leading to the sewer treatment facility.

The two towns were spared greater damages by a levee breach upstream in the Massilon-Toronto region, which flooded up to 1,000 acres (4.0 km^{2}) of farmland, easing what could have been a higher crest.

=== De Witt ===
De Witt sits above the Wapsi, between two minor tributaries of the river. Areas outside the city are expected to flood, and some sandbagging is in progress. The expected crest near De Witt was 14 feet (4.3 m), near to the record set in 1993. The actual crest was 14.13 feet (4.31 m) on Monday, June 18; flood stage is 11 feet (3.4 m).

== Iowa River ==
The Iowa River has the Cedar River as its major tributary.

=== Iowa City-Coralville ===
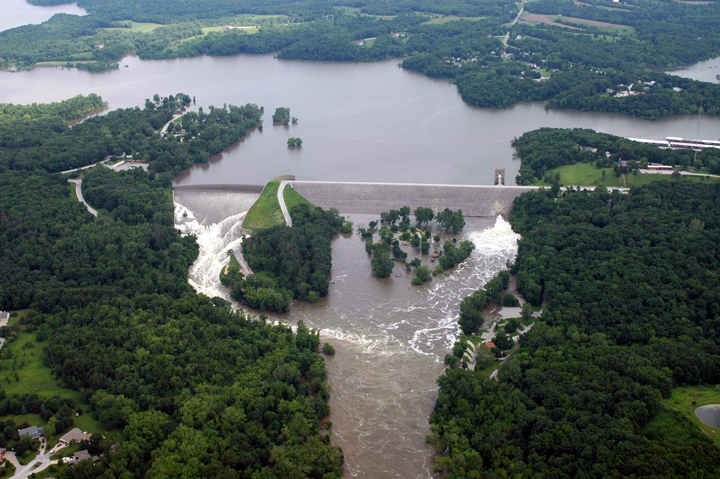
Coralville Dam and Lake, Sunday June 15, 2008, with the spillway fully opened, with water about 5 feet (1.5 m) deep.

Coralville Lake had waters flowing over its emergency spillway at a record breaking crest just short of 717 feet (219 m). Downstream, the Iowa river continued to rise, progressively inundating portions of Coralville and Iowa City. Smaller local tributaries added to the problem, particularly in Iowa City along Ralston Creek and in Coralville, along Clear Creek.

By Saturday, June 14, the river had seriously risen. Warnings were issued for people to prepare to evacuate from the 500-year-flood floodplain. The university prepared beforehand, which consisted of moving important library collections and millions of dollars of artwork out of the way through the help of volunteers. The bookstore in the student union had its contents moved to higher ground. The university's electrical power plant was shut down on Saturday, June 14, as sections of it began to take on water.

In Coralville, the washout of the embankment holding the tracks of the Cedar Rapids and Iowa City Railroad and subsequent high water levels severely compromised the city's access to Iowa City. The DOT decided to close US Highway 6 in two places in the area; one in downtown Coralville and the other in Iowa City at the intersection of Highway 6 and Iowa Highway 1.

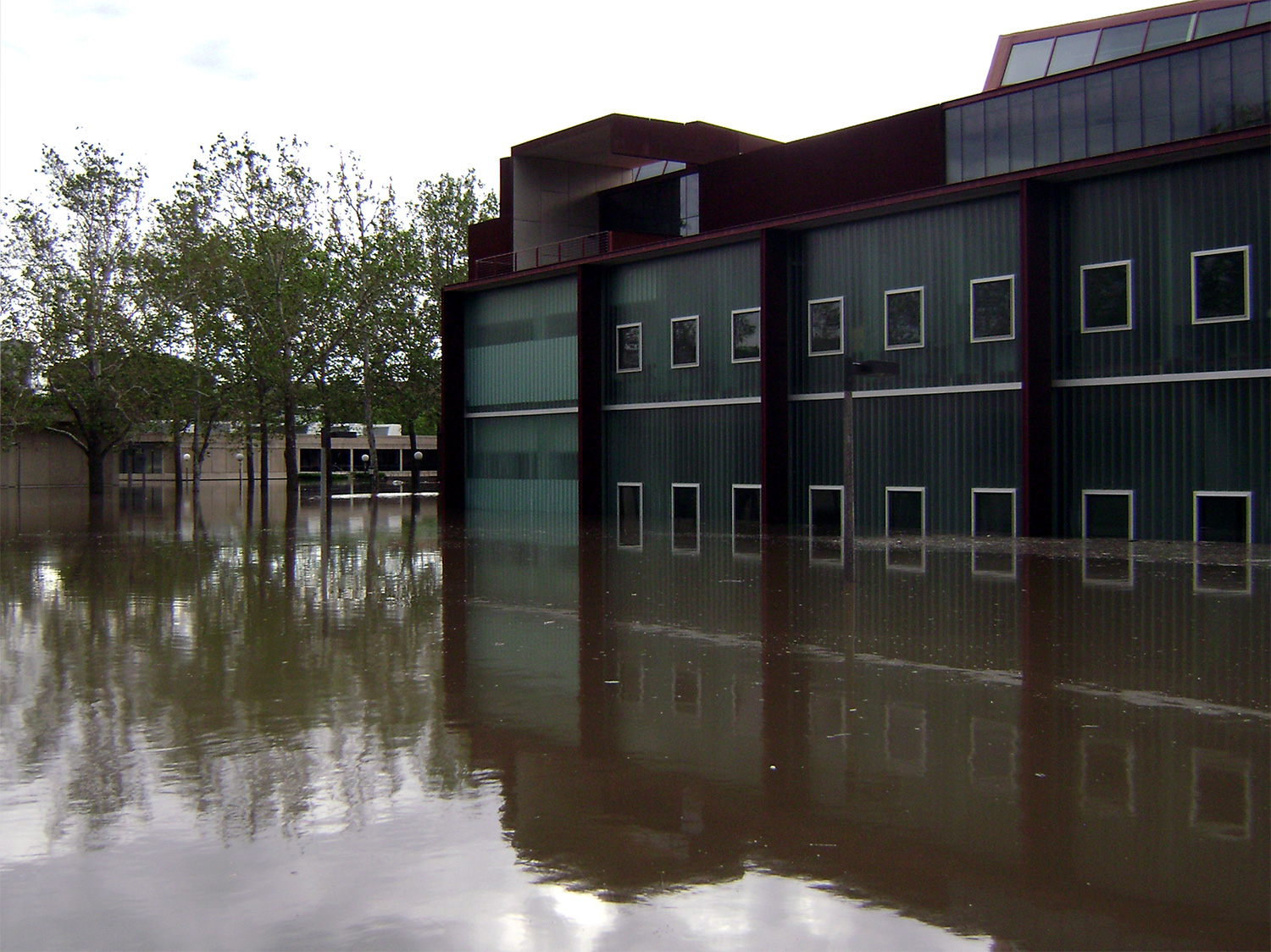
The University of Iowa's Art Building West (foreground) and Art Building (background) during the flood.

The river crested at 31.5 feet (9.6 m), about two feet lower than had been predicted. Sixteen buildings on the University of Iowa campus were initially reported to be flooded, including Hancher Auditorium; this number later increased to at least twenty. There were over 6 million sandbags filled in Johnson County - which is more than were filled during Hurricane Katrina - setting a national record.

The Arts Campus was particularly affected. The University of Iowa School of Art and Art History Art Building and Art Building West were heavily damaged by the flood. Hancher Auditorium took on floodwaters up to the stage level and into the middle of the main floor seats. The Voxman Music Building was filled up to the first floor level. The Theater Building was also significantly damaged by the flood. The University of Iowa Museum of Art was significantly damaged and the building was subsequently rendered uninsurable by Lloyds's of London, the art insurer, prohibiting the art collection from returning to the site. On the east side of the river, the Adler Journalism Building and the Becker Communications Study Building all had water in their basements. The main library had only minor flooding in its basement. The Iowa Memorial Union took on water in its basement and first floor. Mayflower residence hall, home to about 1,000 students during the school year, took on water in its underground parking and utility areas as well as into parts of the first floor. At one time, the dorm was projected to remain closed for at least a semester, if not for the whole 2008–2009 academic year. However, the damages to the building were not as significant as previously estimated, and Mayflower opened for the 2008–09 school year. The campus had miles of utility tunnels, some of them crossing under the river, and maintaining electrical and air conditioning service was difficult. Summer courses resumed on Monday, June 23.

=== Hills ===
Hills is about six miles (9.7 km) downstream from Iowa City. The town heavily sandbagged over that weekend, and there were hopes that the water would spread out into open farmland and spare the town - which ended up occurring, resulting in few flooded basements. The town was featured on ABC's World News Sunday on June 15, where a reporter interviewed Mayor Russ Bailey. The report showed people sandbagging in front of the city maintenance building.

=== Wapello ===
Wapello, the county seat of Louisa County, experienced a levee breach and residents were evacuated as a precaution. A few homes and farmland were destroyed, but the town was kept mostly safe due to its higher elevation and no one in the town was injured or killed by the flood as a result.

=== Oakville ===
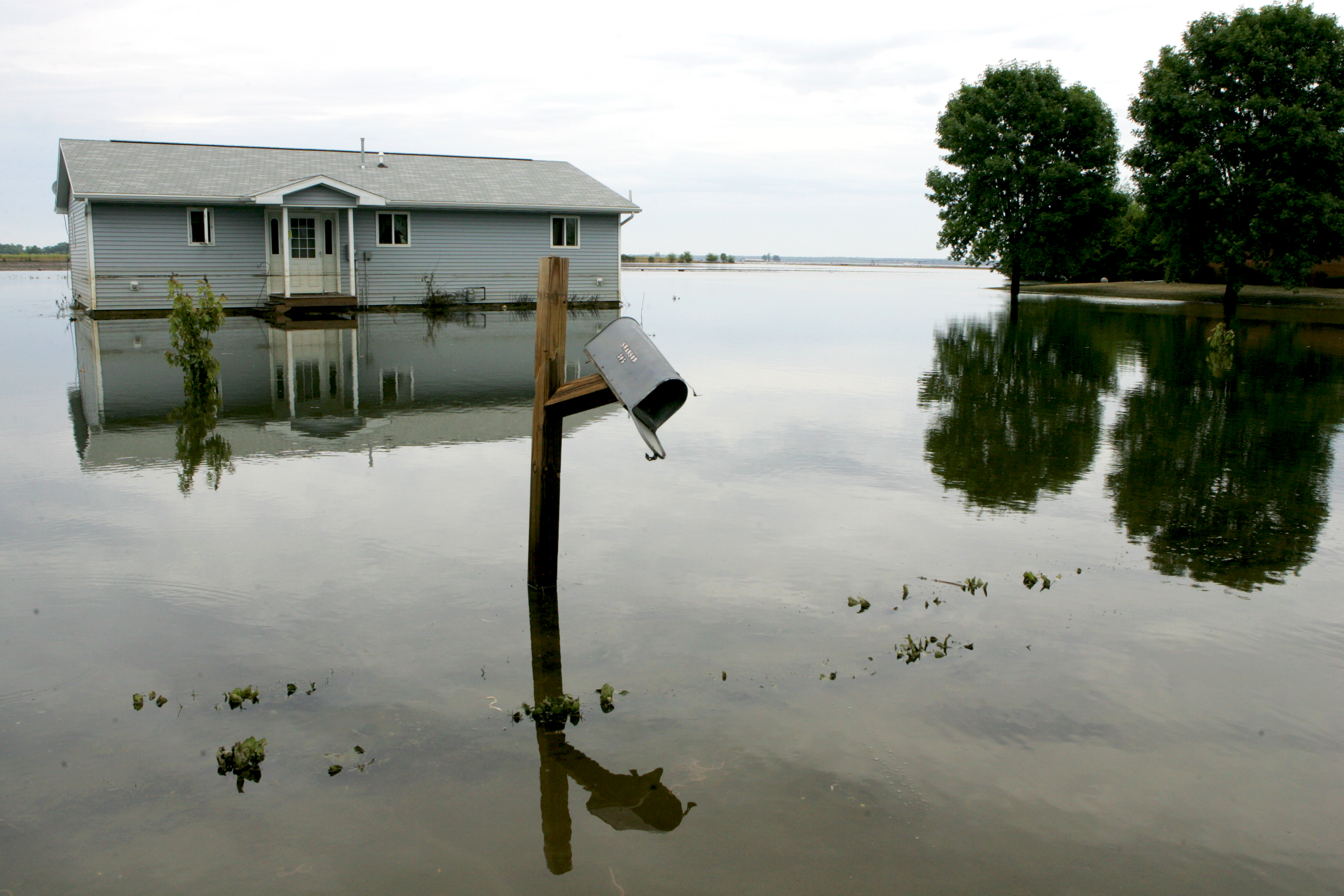
A house in Oakville sits surrounded by water, after the Iowa River burst its banks.

Oakville is the last town on the Iowa River before it empties into the Mississippi river. The authorities believed it would be in danger when the river crested and had issued an evacuation order to take effect on Monday, June 16. However, in the early morning of June 14, a river levee near the town failed catastrophically, resulting in an immediate emergency evacuation order. In an interview with NPR, the mayor of Oakville recounted that she was in the town hall with members of the National Guard when the town's fire chief drove up to the building and started shouting, "The levee's breaking, get out, get out now."

Within hours, most of the town was submerged under several feet of water and remained flooded for days. On July 1, the levee was still open to the river, and water was still passing through it. The Corps of Engineers constructed a rock and earthen temporary levee, but almost all of the buildings were damaged or destroyed. Almost none of the residents carried flood insurance, and repairs on the permanent levee were delayed.

== Cedar River ==
A number of cities and rural areas suffered serious flooding, with the most extreme flooding occurring in Cedar Rapids.

=== Charles City ===
Charles City experienced the earliest flooding on the Cedar, starting on Sunday, June 9. It was reported as the worst flood in the city's history. The city's historic suspension bridge was swept away.

=== Waverly ===
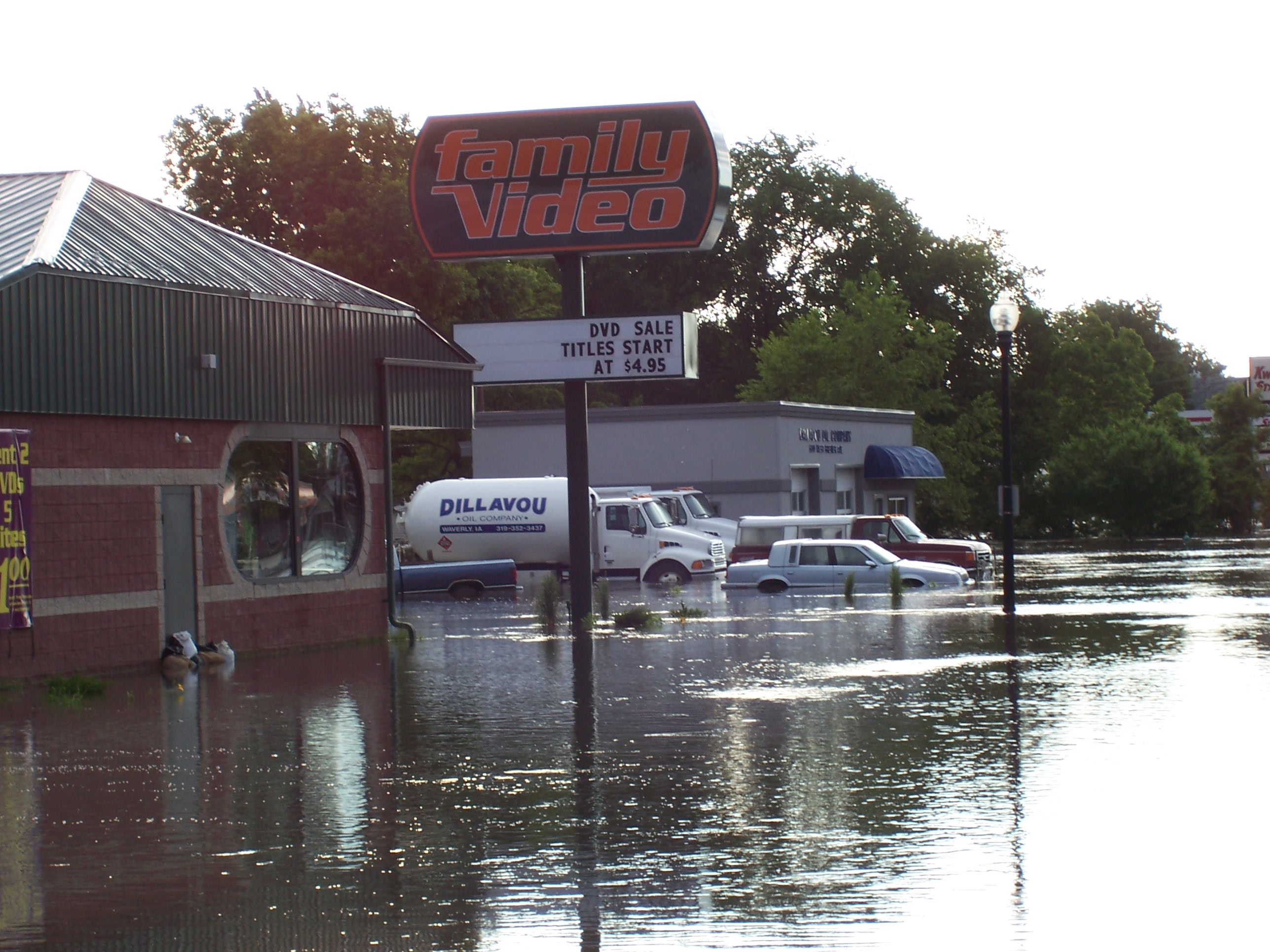
Bremer Avenue after the record crest of the Cedar River in 2008.

Waverly was caught somewhat unprepared for the river's height, causing officials to scramble; the river crested locally at 19.33 feet (5.89 m) on June 10, with a second crest of 13.73 ft experienced on June 15. More than 2500 people were evacuated. Much of the town was inundated with many homes and businesses experiencing flood damage. In the flood's aftermath 151 homes were reported to be flood-impacted, with 69 properties eventually being bought out by the city. Since 2008, Waverly has been an example forecast point to better help with predicting river crest levels and impact information that was not available during the 2008 floods. In 2011, Waverly completed the construction of a 4.3 million dollar inflatable dam. The dam is designed to protect more than 400 homes and businesses in the event of a 100-year flood and will provide relief in 500-year flood events.

=== Cedar Falls-Waterloo ===
Cedar Falls, home of the University of Northern Iowa, is on the west bank of the Cedar River, and north of Waterloo, which occupies both banks of the river.

Hundreds of homes in Waterloo and north Cedar Falls were underwater, along with Waterloo's downtown. This led to the closing of the bridges, cutting off the city halves to each other. The Waterloo Courier lost the use of its printing plant but continued printing by courtesy of the Cedar Rapids Gazette. As of June 7, 2012, 150 homes in northern Cedar Falls were bought out as part of the flood recovery.

On the morning of Wednesday, June 11, television news station KWWL was knocked off the air by a "flood-related" power outage but regained power by the afternoon by using a generator. Then on the night of Monday, June 16, at about 9:30, KWWL lost power, putting them off of the air, and had a small electrical fire in a part of their building. An electric motor burned and sent smoke through the building. They were able to resume broadcasts on the morning of Tuesday, June 17.

After three floods in the 1960s, Waterloo and Cedar Falls spent years building levees and flood gates along the Cedar River and two of its tributaries. During the flood of 2008, water became trapped behind those levees and was kept from returning to the river. The City of Waterloo built pump stations to pump out water from behind the dikes in the event of future flooding.

=== La Porte City ===
La Porte City suffered an earlier significant flood at the end of May. By June 10, the city experienced more significant flooding.

=== Vinton ===
Vinton experienced the worst flooding in its history starting in the early morning of Wednesday, June 10 with a crest upwards of 24 feet (7.3 m). The flood knocked out the municipal electrical generating plant, inundating about 15 blocks along the river. The Benton County jail had to be evacuated. The sheriff's office was inundated, as was the basement, where 911 dispatchers were housed.

=== Palo ===
The small town of Palo, just upstream from Cedar Rapids, and home of Iowa's only nuclear power plant, underwent a mandatory evacuation. The nuclear plant sustained no damage but did lose land-based telephone service, as the affected land lines were routed through Palo.

On Wednesday, June 11, the city completely evacuated all of its 980 citizens. All road access was later cut off, and the city went completely underwater. Around 90% of the structures in the community had water damage. People were to return on June 15 but were delayed by hazards such as contamination due to the flood and floating propane tanks. By Tuesday, June 17, it was reported that residents had for the most part returned home to deal with damage. Some buildings were more damaged than others; ranging from flooded basements to first floor water levels.

About a month after the flood, mayor Terry Sanders resigned. Jeff Beauregard was appointed as the interim mayor. Beauregard was recognized for his flood recovery efforts and was awarded the 2008 Iowa League of Cities Rhonda Wood Johnson award, amongst others. The community has been recognized as a model for flood recovery efforts. Due to expedited recovery efforts and processes such as temporary occupancy permits, as of January 1, a majority of Palo residents were back into their homes. The city passed a one cent sales tax in March 2009 with an 82% approval to deal with the community's recovery.

=== Cedar Rapids ===
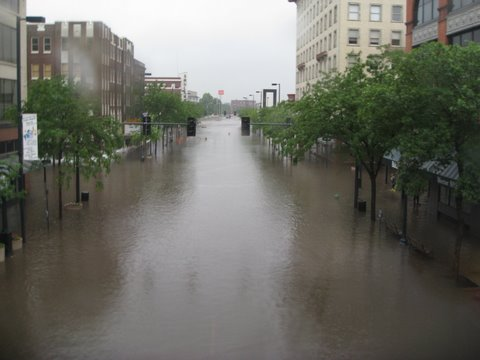
A flood on 3rd Avenue in Cedar Rapids.

Cedar Rapids began to be affected by the Cedar River on Monday, June 9. Ellis Boulevard NW near Ellis Park closed due to flood water. Water was nearly over the access road to the Ellis boat harbor on Monday evening. By Tuesday morning, June 10, Edgewood Road from Glass Road NE to O Ave NW (including the bridge) was closed as flood waters overtook the western section of the roadway near the City Gardens area.

Mid American Energy began terminating natural gas service to the Time Check and Osbourne Park neighborhoods of northwest Cedar Rapids around 5 p.m. on Tuesday, June 10. Alliant Energy reported that electrical service to the Time Check area would be terminated. In 2015, the Sixth Street Generating Station was demolished.

Cedar Rapids, Iowa was one of the hardest hit areas during the floods. The Cedar River crested at 31.12 ft (19 feet above flood stage) at 10:15 am on Friday, June 13, 2008, with the flood waters retreating by early July.

The 1st Street NW Time Check Levee, built in the 1930s after the Great Flood of 1929 (20 ft crest), was completely submerged by the Cedar River, according to KCRG-TV footage captured on the morning of Thursday, June 12, 2008. A homeowner measured from the waterline on his house to a point equal to the top of the levee using a laser level, finding that the levee had been under approximately 56 inches (4.5 feet) of water.

About 1,300 blocks, or 10 square miles - including most of the downtown area - were inundated, with more than 5,000 homes being affected. Mays Island (which included the Cedar Rapids city hall, the Linn County courthouse, the county jail, and the federal courthouse) was flooded up to the second floor level. Buildings that did not suffer any first floor damage had flooded basements. The Czech Village, Time Check, and Cedar Valley/Rompot districts in particular sustained significant damage. The city's domestic water distribution was compromised, all but one of the city's wells were flooded. Water usage restrictions were imposed; however through a massive sandbagging effort, the city's last remaining well was kept operational throughout the disaster. The river dropped faster than previously expected. A revised figure of 31.3 feet (9.5 m) was issued for the crest.

Linn County moved most of its government offices, including the county courts, to the campus of Kirkwood Community College and later to a former Montgomery Ward store in Westdale Mall.

Tremendous disruption to the city's utilities occurred. Electricity was cut off to the flooded parts of the city by the power company, Alliant Energy, as was natural gas; telephone and internet service was also disrupted.

As the waters receded, flooded buildings were inspected by "strike teams" before owners were allowed to return and check out the damage. They used a color-coded system. Green meant the building was safe for occupancy, yellow meant entry should be limited and at one's own risk, red indicated serious damage/no entry, and purple was later used for buildings which were to be demolished. The largest issues with homes were collapsing basements or foundations. In cases where water had reached the first floor or higher, there was a failure of the floor joists, leading to a sagging or collapse into the basement. The Time Check neighborhood was particularly hard hit, where hundreds of homes were demolished. Much of the neighborhood was bought out, with continued plans to convert much of the land into a park, referred to as the "Greenway Parks Plan".

On the third anniversary of the disaster (June 12, 2011), Cedar Rapids was still rebuilding. The city was yet to rebuild the main branch of its public library, the new federal courthouse was under construction, and the city government was in process of moving back to May's Island. These projects have since been completed. The iconic Dairy Queen on 1st Ave downtown was gone, and many other businesses were not able to recover. On June 13, 2011, the replica of The Statue of Liberty was rededicated on May's Island after being washed away by the flood.

Statistics

- Houses damaged: 5,238 (parcels: 5,390)
- Businesses damaged: 940 (parcels: 1,049)
- Non-profits/faith organizations damaged: 77
- City blocks affected: 1,300 (10 square miles)
- River levels: Crest 31.12 feet June 13, 2008 at 10:15 am (flood stage 12 feet),

One month after crest: 8.66 feet, Two months after crest: 4.43 feet,

- Previous record crests: 20 feet in 1929 and 1951, 19.27 feet in 1993

==== Cultural losses ====
The Paramount Theatre, one of the city's premier cultural venues, was flooded up to the first floor. The 1928 Wurlitzer theater organ console was found to have floated up onto the stage and the wood of the console said to be a total loss. The historic theater had recently completed an extensive restoration project prior to the flood. In July 2009, the city indicated that they had selected an architect to direct the reconstruction of the theater. While the interior of the building was heavily damaged, the structure of the theater remained relatively sound.

The African American Cultural Center and Museum took on water up to the first floor. While some artifacts were damaged, most were saved from the floodwaters. The museum reopened in 2009, with renovations being done to the building as of 2023.

The National Czech & Slovak Museum & Library received water into the first floor area, with the loss of many artifacts and documents. The building was moved and elevated.

The first floor of the main branch of the Cedar Rapids Public Library was filled with floodwater. With a collection of books said to be about 290,000, the entire adult section was lost, as was the reference section. The children's collection, however, was located on the second floor, which had no flooding. Plans to expand the building and to increase the library levy were shelved. On July 3, 2008, the library's director stated that the main branch may not reopen for at least three years, with the possibility open of moving to a new location altogether. In the meantime, the library leased additional space at Westdale Mall, where it already operated a branch. FEMA would not pay for rebuilding the main branch on the current, flood-prone site, so a property swap was done with a commercial property owner away from the river; the new owner paid for renovation, and FEMA paid for a new library across the square from the city art museum. In 2013, the downtown branch of the library was completed by OPN Architects, a regional design firm located in Cedar Rapids. The project has since received many awards in library design and construction by the American Library Association and the American Institute of Architects.

The Helen G. Nassif YMCA building was badly damaged, with an estimated 7½ feet of water on the first floor. The 65,000-square-foot (6,000 m^{2}) downtown facility was built in 2002 for a cost of $8 million. The facility has since reopened.

The Mother Mosque of America, the oldest building in the United States built specifically for use as a mosque, had its basement flooded, ruining a century's worth of documents and artifacts.

Theatre Cedar Rapids' basement, stage, and a large part of the auditorium was flooded. The Wurlitzer organ was heavily damaged and was rebuilt out of state; it has since been restored. The theatre was able to return to its downtown location in February 2009.

==== United States Courthouse ====
Congress had authorized a new United States Courthouse to replace the current crowded, outdated building located on 1st Street SE. Both of Iowa's senators pushed to move up the appropriation necessary to build the new facility, rather than repair the flood-damaged building. As of 2013, construction has been completed on the new Cedar Rapids Federal Courthouse, and it is located across the street from the Helen G. Nassif YMCA on 8th Avenue Southeast.

==== Law enforcement ====
The flood greatly stressed the local police and sheriff's departments. Cedar Rapids Police Chief Greg Graham contacted Minneapolis Police Chief Tim Dolan for emergency assistance, as Graham's officers had been working for over twenty-four hours. Minneapolis sent the first contingent of officers headed by Deputy Chief Rob Allen. The state activated the National Guard, around 750 soldiers were sent to the city. Members of the Iowa State Patrol, the Iowa Department of Public Safety, and the Iowa Division of Criminal Investigation also responded, alongside Sheriff's departments from other Iowa counties. The federal government also deployed agents from the Federal Bureau of Investigation, ATF, the Drug Enforcement Administration, and United States Immigration and Customs Enforcement. The Nebraska State Patrol and the Lincoln, Nebraska Police Department sent officers.

Officers from the Twin Cities area also assisted, which included members of the Hennepin County, Minnesota sheriff's office, as well as officers from the Minneapolis, Bloomington and Saint Paul police departments. Assistance was also provided by Minnesota state troopers. The Hennepin County Sheriff's Department also supplied a portable repeater to assist in radio communications, as the existing repeater had been knocked out by the flood waters.

The list of all agencies that was deployed to assist in Cedar Rapids is as follows: ATF Bloomington Minnesota Police, Cass County Iowa Sheriff, Decorah Iowa Police, Delaware County Iowa Sheriff, DEA, FBI, Hennepin County Minnesota Sheriff, ICE, Indianola Iowa Police, Iowa Air National Guard, Iowa Army National Guard, Iowa Department of Public Safety Enforcement, Iowa Division of Criminal Investigation, Iowa State Patrol, Iowa Navy Reserve, Jones County Iowa Sheriff, Lincoln Nebraska Police, Linn County Iowa Sheriff, Lisbon Iowa Police, Marion Iowa Police, Minneapolis Minnesota Police, Mt. Vernon Iowa Police, Nebraska State Police, Iowa Region 3 & 4 FUSION centers, St. Paul Minnesota Police, Toledo Iowa Police, US Coast Guard, US Department of Narcotics Enforcement, US Marshals Service, US Postal inspectors Police, US Treasury Department Enforcement, Warren County Iowa Sheriff, and West Branch Iowa Police.

Most assistance was used to man roadblocks and barricades. Extra officers were also placed with Cedar Rapids Police officers to help patrol flood-affected areas and to handle excess calls. Officers from the St. Paul Minnesota Police handled routine calls such as bar-checks in Marion, whereas FBI and ICE agents, in co-operation with the Toledo Iowa Police, handled burglary calls in Cedar Rapids.

The police department, located on the west bank of the river, was flooded and evacuated. By Friday, June 20, 2008, they reoccupied the building as cleanup ensued.

==== Economic losses ====
Job losses were estimated to be in the 6,000–7,000 range. Officials urged those whose jobs were washed away by the flood to file for unemployment insurance, even those who might not be otherwise eligible, as disaster unemployment benefits were available.

Business losses were considerable. Many small businesses were heavily affected, particularly in the Czech Village area. The Cargill soybean plant and mill were reopened. Archer Daniels Midland expected to get its plant back online by the end of June.

Quaker Oats is a major employer in Cedar Rapids. Mark Schiller, Quaker's president, indicated that the plant was largely undamaged, and that the main impediment to full reopening was the lack of adequate electric service, and that rail lines were closed. The plant reopened in mid August, 2008.

==== Recovery ====
By Wednesday, June 18, the waters had receded greatly, leaving remnants only in the Time Check neighborhood on the west bank of the river and the Czech Village district, which lies on both sides of the river. Importantly, most bridges had been reopened, relieving the stress on the I-380 which had been the only crossing that remained open, though with severe restrictions. While downtown became accessible, power remained off and traffic signals were out; this was due to transformers in underground vaults continuing to receive water. Water restrictions were also eased and people were allowed to use of showers and washing machines.

By June 2013, some residents were still struggling with the consequences of the flood. For many residents, a "new normal" had been found, including a new sense of community.

==== Sutliff ====
Flooding badly damaged the NRHP Sutliff Bridge at Sutliff. The bridge was restored and reopened in 2012.

=== Columbus Junction, Columbus City and Fredonia ===
Columbus Junction, Columbus City and Fredonia are close to each other at the confluence of the Cedar River and the Iowa River. Columbus Junction is located on the south bank of the Iowa river, of which Columbus City is to the south of. Fredonia is located on the north bank of the Iowa river.

Early attempts at sandbagging in Columbus Junction were abandoned Saturday, June 14. Resources were then diverted to Oskaloosa on the Skunk River.

Fredonia and parts of Columbus Junction and Columbus City were evacuated. Residents were allowed to return on June 16. Columbus Junction and Columbus City regained water, but were under a boil order.

Governor Chet Culver was flown into the area by Blackhawk helicopter on June 16, 2008. Louisa County received a presidential disaster declaration.

=== Tipton ===
Tipton is the seat of Cedar County. The county was reported to have had some damage and was declared a presidential disaster area.

== Skunk River ==
=== Colfax ===
Colfax is located east of northeastern Des Moines. By June 9, the South Skunk river had risen sufficiently to start sandbagging.

U.S. Highway 61 was closed off for five miles (8.0 km) south of Burlington due to the rising waters blocking off the road.

=== Oskaloosa ===
Oskaloosa is located between the South Skunk River and the Des Moines River downstream from Lake Red Rock. National Guardsmen who had been designated for Columbus Junction were sent to Oskaloosa. Around 7 a.m. on Thursday June 12, sandbagging began in an effort to save the city's water plant, which continued until noon. The Army Corps of Engineers later ordered that sandbagging must resume, starting up around 5 pm and continuing late into the night. Musco Sports Lighting sent a portable lighting truck to help the volunteers see overnight. The sandbagging continued until about noon on Friday June 13 when it was allowed to cease. This sandbagging had saved the city's water plant.

== Des Moines River ==
=== Des Moines ===
In Des Moines, a levee breach flooded the Birdland Park neighborhood, north of downtown. The river was past its crest by Friday, June 13, but advisories were still in effect.

In the morning hours of June 13, the Army Corps of Engineers called for a complete evacuation of a 100-year flood zone in downtown Des Moines, but the data used to call the evacuation turned out to be false because of a faulty water flow rate sensor. Residents returned to their homes by the end of the day.

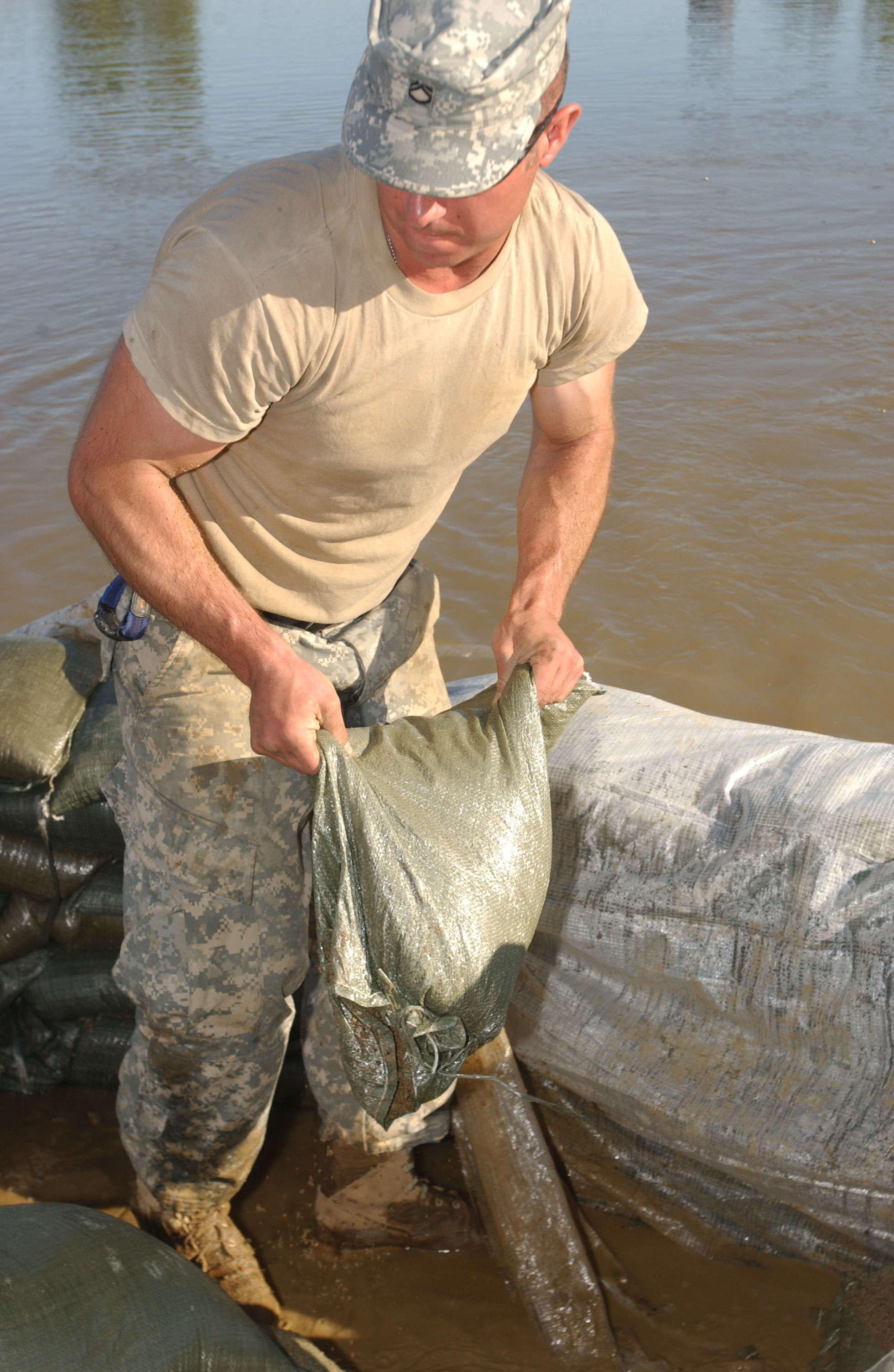
Iowa National Guardsman sandbagging in Ottumwa in June 2008 (click for a larger image) (photo by Sgt. Chad D. Nelson, 135th MPAD, Iowa National Guard)

=== Ottumwa ===
Ottumwa is downstream from Oskaloosa. An electrical substation was threatened. Elements from the Iowa National Guard's 334th Brigade Support Battalion and the 1st Battalion, 133rd Infantry, had earlier deployed to Cedar Falls and Oskaloosa and formed a human chain to successfully sandbag the facility.

== Mississippi River ==
The Army Corps was forced to close the river to navigation intermittently from Lock and Dam No. 11 to Lock and Dam No. 25. Locks 13 through 25 remained closed on Sunday, June 15, making 281 miles (452 km) of the Mississippi River inaccessible to commercial river traffic. Mississippi River traffic resumed on Saturday, July 5, according to the Army Corps of Engineers, as the final lock to be cleared for operation, Lock 25, reopened Saturday morning.

=== Dubuque ===
Dubuque was not as severely affected as other Iowa cities. Over the course of the flood, Dubuque experienced only occasional flash flooding on the Little Maquoketa River or Catfish Creek. Lock and Dam No. 11 had its floodgates opened by the Army Corps to prevent the dam from being overtopped by flood stage waters.

=== Quad Cities ===
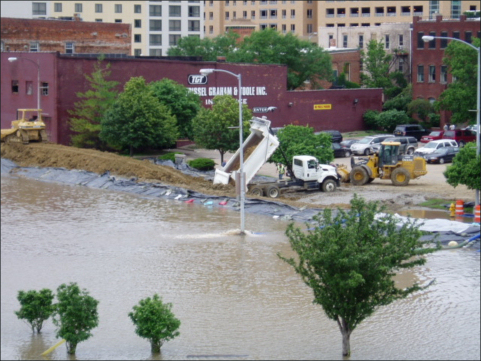
View of downtown Davenport June 2008, showing erection of a temporary levee.

The Mississippi River topped the 15-foot (4.6 m) flood stage in the Quad Cities on June 11, 2008. Davenport is the largest city bordering the Mississippi that has no permanent floodwall or levee. On June 12, 3.28 inches of rain fell in six hours at the Quad City International Airport due to severe thunderstorms and high winds, breaking the rain fall record for that time period, adding major problems to the flooding. The rain caused not only the Mississippi River to flood, but the Duck Creek flooded as well. Duck Creek is a creek which winds through central Davenport. Duck Creek topped four feet over flood stage. Three of the seven main streets - including U.S. Route 61 which was being used as a detour for Interstate 80 - that cross the creek were blocked off due to major flooding over the roads. The river is expected to crest on June 16, at 21.3 feet (6.5 m) which is 6.3 feet (1.9 m) over flood stage, then start falling shortly after. The river was expected to be down to 18.6 feet (5.7 m) by June 21, but was expected to not be back to the 15-foot (4.6 m) flood stage until sometime during the week of June 22. The YouTube article "Lightning Hitting the Ground/Flooded Mississippi" is one of several videotaping shots which relates to the severe thunderstorms which created the flooding at Duck Creek during Thursday, June 12 and Friday, June 13.

=== Burlington ===
In the city of Burlington, the river disrupted national transportation.

In the early morning hours of May 1, 2008, five river barges came loose from their moorings at a staging area a short distance upstream of Burlington. While two ran aground before they reached the city, the remaining three struck the far eastern pier of the Great River Bridge with minimal impact. The bridge was closed to traffic until later the same afternoon, after the Iowa Department of Transportation inspected it and found it structurally sound. One of those barges continued downstream and became lodged under the Burlington Rail Bridge. After two unsuccessful recovery attempts, the 140-year-old rail bridge was partially reopened the following morning with the barge still wedged beneath.

Flood waters caused the city to close off the area of the riverfront along Front Street to Main Street. Several buildings along Main Street, including the county courthouse and the historic railroad depot, utilized several sandbags around the buildings in an attempt to keep the rising flood waters at bay. Buildings as far west as Fourth Street (four blocks west of, and parallel to, the riverfront), and the historic fire station, were pumping out their basements due to the flood waters.

On the morning of June 10, all rail traffic was halted at the BNSF Bridge and rerouted to other, safer bridges, as the level of the river was just a little over five feet from the bottom of the tracks, and flood waters had begun to overtake the bridge's western approach into Iowa, by the morning of June 15, the river had placed itself to the bottom of the bridge, hiding all piers, and causing the bridge to appear as if it were simply resting on top of the water.

The city's rail yard, which runs parallel to the riverfront, began to experience flooding for the first time since the Flood of 1993 on the afternoon of June 12, as it encroached on their diversion spurs, and began to follow the tracks leading out of the city. By mid-afternoon on June 15, the entire yard had flooded out, by the morning of June 16, the flood waters were so deep in the rail yard, the tracks were no longer visible.

Several buildings along the waterfront, including Memorial Auditorium, and the historic Port of Burlington building, began sandbagging efforts early on the morning of June 11 to keep out the rising flood waters.

By the morning of June 12 the flood waters began to fill the parking lots of businesses along the riverfront, including the Port of Burlington and Memorial Auditorium, both of which sit at the river's edge, by the morning of June 16, both buildings had flooded up to the main floor, as the flood waters seeped through cracks between the sandbags, rendering the work that had been done to protect them useless. The outdoor stage - built five feet up from the ground and made of concrete - that connected to the south facade of the Port of Burlington building was not visible, nor were the access ramps that ran along the entire western entrance.

During the afternoon of June 14, the city as well as Des Moines County evacuated all residents living east of County Highway 99 due to a levee in the area threatening to fail. A bulge had been seen on one side of the levee, and water was pooling near the base on the dry side, by the early morning of June 16, three more bulges were discovered along the Tama Levee, the longest levee in the area.

One of the city's largest employers, Case Corporation, had been threatened with rising flood waters, due to its proximity to the riverfront and to a levee that was severely damaged due to constant rainfall in the area. By the morning of June 15, Case had ceased all production and ordered a shutdown of the plant, allowing workers to help in the sandbagging effort. The plant survived the flood unscathed, the flood being the fourth it had withstood. The plant had previously withstood the floods of 1965, 1973, and 1993.

By the early evening of June 14, residents were put on alert that water might be shut off, due to the possibility of flood waters reaching the treatment plant along the riverfront. However, on the morning of June 15, it was stated that the plant would not be affected, unless the river were to crest at or above the 30-foot (9.1 m) mark. According to records, this had not happened in over a century, nor since the recent water treatment plant had been built.

Burlington's newspaper, The Hawk-Eye, remained in operation throughout the flood, despite its close proximity to the Mississippi River.

One of two major highways that serve the Burlington area, U.S. Highway 61, was closed off just south of the city, near the county line. On July 19, 2008, the Great River Bridge, connecting Highway 34 west with Illinois, officially re-opened after being closed for nearly a month. The Great River bridge serves as an important connection to Illinois, as nearly 40% of Burlington's workforce lived in nearby Illinois, while several Burlington residents worked in Illinois' cities.

The early morning of June 15 saw a section of Main Street, between Division Street, and Jefferson Street blocked off, due to the rising flood waters.

The entire length of County Highway 99, from the city limits, to the northern county line, was blocked off, due to the rising flood waters, and a break along a levee on the Iowa River near Oakville. However, the road had already been blocked off near the northern county line, due to construction.

The National Weather Service expected the river to crest on June 18 at 25.8 feet (7.9 m), surpassing the crest of the Flood of 1993 by 0.7 feet, making it the second worst flood in the city's history.

By the morning of June 15, several streets had been closed, making travel difficult. These streets included the entire length of Front Street, Main Street, between Division Street, and Jefferson Street, Mill Dam Road, Tama Road, and all of its side roads, U.S. Highway 61, and County Highway 99. By the morning of June 17, Main Street had been blocked off even further, extending another block to the south, and Division Street had been blocked off up to Third Street, along with Jefferson Street and Valley Street.

By June 15, Lock and Dam 18, located north of the city, had stated that if the river does not begin to recede soon, they would be forced to open the flood gates, due to the possibility of the river topping over the dam.

On the morning of June 15, the Stevenson Lake levee, near Gulfport, Illinois gave way, bringing the depth of the river down somewhat. However, this also submerged the small town, which lay directly across the river in Illinois. By July 23, 2008, Gulfport remained under water. Because Gulfport sits below the Mississippi river level, it would need to be drained using pumps, which had been done by the end of August. The damage to several buildings, including The Beverage Mart, was noticeable. Many buildings would be demolished later on. As most residents were without flood insurance, reconstruction of many buildings was never completed. As of 2026, the population is 38.

The following summer, several construction companies finally were allowed into the area, which had been previously blocked off by the Illinois State Police and the Henderson County Sheriff's office.

In September 2008, the area once again became the victim of massive flooding as a spillway off the river, known as Flint Creek. The creek - as well as a small pool area known as Dumbbell Lake - jumped the banks after a week of hard rain caused by the remnants of Hurricane Ike. Tama Road was severely damaged due to flood waters and was caught on both sides of the road. The flooding was so severe that the earthen embankments eroded, and the concrete road bed fractured and later crumbled, causing widespread damage over the two mile length of the road. By December 2008, the road remained closed due to massive damage. In several areas along County Highway 99, the flood waters came against the high embankments, making the fields on the east side of the road appear as a large lake area for an estimated five miles. This flooding could also be seen along certain areas of U.S. Highway 61, at the north end of town. Although neither highway was flooded out or closed, the damage was noticeable, especially where County Highway 99 was at its most vulnerable - two of the four piers constructed for a new bridge near the northern county line were knocked over and had to be rebuilt. By December 2009, Tama Road remained unpaved, with gravel filling in the areas where the old concrete road bed had given out. In the areas where the road had been destroyed, a difference in road height of three feet or more was observable. Continuing arguments between the Burlington City Council, and the Des Moines County Board of Supervisors over responsibility of the road prevented many repairs from taking place - in the mid-1970s, the city had paved the road in concrete, taking responsibility from the county, therefore the city argued is that the road sits outside the city limits, making the county is responsible.

In early 2010, after a final winter thaw eroded the roadbed even further - completely destroying what was left of the road - the state took over the reconstruction and billed the city for their services. The road was re-opened later that same year, having been completely repaved and set with a new waterproof concrete roadbed with several new drainage culverts.

== Media response ==
The local TV news stations started wall-to-wall coverage on Wednesday, June 11. KGAN-TV (CBS, channel 2) and KCRG-TV (ABC, channel 9), in Cedar Rapids, and KWWL-TV, (NBC, channel 7) in Waterloo all stayed on the air to give local coverage, preempting network programs, including the evening news program. KCRG moved ABC's coverage of Game 4 of the 2008 NBA Finals to its digital sub-channel, while KWWL broadcast NBC's coverage of the 2008 U.S. Open Golf Championship. Stations resumed airing regular programming on June 15.

Des Moines television stations aired all local coverage during the day on Friday, June 13. WHO-TV had briefly allowed NBC to announce the death of Tim Russert. After the Des Moines flood threat proved to be not as bad as predicted, stations returned to regular programming that evening.

KCRG and The Gazette, both owned by Gazette Communications and located adjacent to each other in downtown Cedar Rapids, continued to operate out of their respective newsrooms despite the nearby flooding and loss of electricity. The Gazette's editor at the time, Steve Buttry, officially began his duties just two days before waters rose above flood stage in Cedar Rapids.

At about 9:30 p.m. on Monday, June 16, KWWL went off the air due to a small electrical fire in the studio. An electrical motor in the ventilation system caught fire and sent smoke throughout the building. There were no injuries and minimal damage. They resumed broadcasts at around 1:00 a.m. on Tuesday, June 17.

== Public health ==
Iowa counties presidentially declared as disasters designated to receive various types of assistance. Public Assistance Public and Individual Assistance Individual Assistance

Just after midnight on June 13, Mercy Medical Center in Cedar Rapids began evacuating its patients from the facility, given that they could not further function under the emergency circumstances. The evacuation was completed by about 8:20 a.m.

=== Public Health Hazards: Physical and Mental ===
The main public health hazard was the polluted water, mixed with the outflow of overwhelmed sanitary sewer systems, petroleum products and a variety of other toxic materials, including asbestos. As the waters receded, tremendous amounts of potentially infectious debris added to the problem; this included uncollected garbage and dead animals. This issue was exacerbated by the onset of the hot and humid summer weather. The problem of mold propagating in flooded buildings was one of major concern.

Contact with polluted water and flood soaked item can cause rashes, and if it comes in contact with a skin cut, a variety of infections can occur. Public officials warned of a potential increase in waterborne diseases such as dysentery as well as an increased population of mosquitoes, which can carry West Nile virus.

Free tetanus shots were being offered in many areas, including Cedar Rapids and Iowa City.

In addition to physical disease, residents were warned of potential mental health problems. Parents were told to expect developmental regressions in child survivors of the flood, especially those who lost their homes. Even in adults, the stress of applying for services and managing daily activities under catastrophic conditions was expected to exacerbate pre-existing anxiety, depression, or family conflict. The physical and emotional stress of cleaning out flooded homes was only part of the trouble, as parents needed to manage the conditions while caring for children who were home on summer vacation. These conditions were compounded by the summer heat and humidity, mosquitos and biting gnats, and the sheer number of residents facing the same circumstances. Long-term consequences were possible as well. "Once the original shock and dismay pass, the losses of such things as wedding photos or treasured family heirlooms can lead to depression and even post-traumatic stress disorder," said one official.

Some rural areas suffered from a lack of access to necessary public and social services, and agencies were overwhelmed with the increase of people needing assistance. Due to the large area of the Midwest affected by the flooding, some rivers and tributaries took an unusually long time to recede, with some areas remaining flooded for up to four weeks. The increased amount of standing water and flood-affected ground caused a summer-long increased population of biting midge gnats (sand flies), fungus gnats, flies, and mosquitoes, with the above-mentioned public health concerns.

==== FEMA trailer problems ====
Problems arose in trailers provided by FEMA to residents displaced by this flood. Several months after moving to the trailers, occupants reported violent coughing, headaches, as well as asthma, bronchitis, and other problems. Tests showed that in some trailers, levels of formaldehyde exceeded the limits recommended by the U.S. Environmental Protection Agency and American Lung Association. The associated publicity resulted in additional testing being planned to begin in November 2008.

== Recovery ==
Comparison has been made to the Grand Forks, North Dakota, 1997 Red River flood, Hurricane Katrina, and the Great Flood of 1993. The overall lesson that was to be learned was that full recovery would take at least ten years, and that the political and private establishments would have to put aside territorial one-ups-man-ship and co-operate in making decisions that might be decidedly unpopular.

To assist in recovery efforts, a website named Save Iowa was established to help flood victims and to collect donations for various flood relief causes. As of 2026, however, the website is no longer active.

In response to the Iowa flood of 2008, the Iowa Legislature established the Iowa Flood Center as a part of the University of Iowa in 2009.

== See also ==
- June 2008 Midwest floods
