= Klais Orgelbau =

Pipe organ building company

Coordinates: 50°44′34″N 7°05′34″E

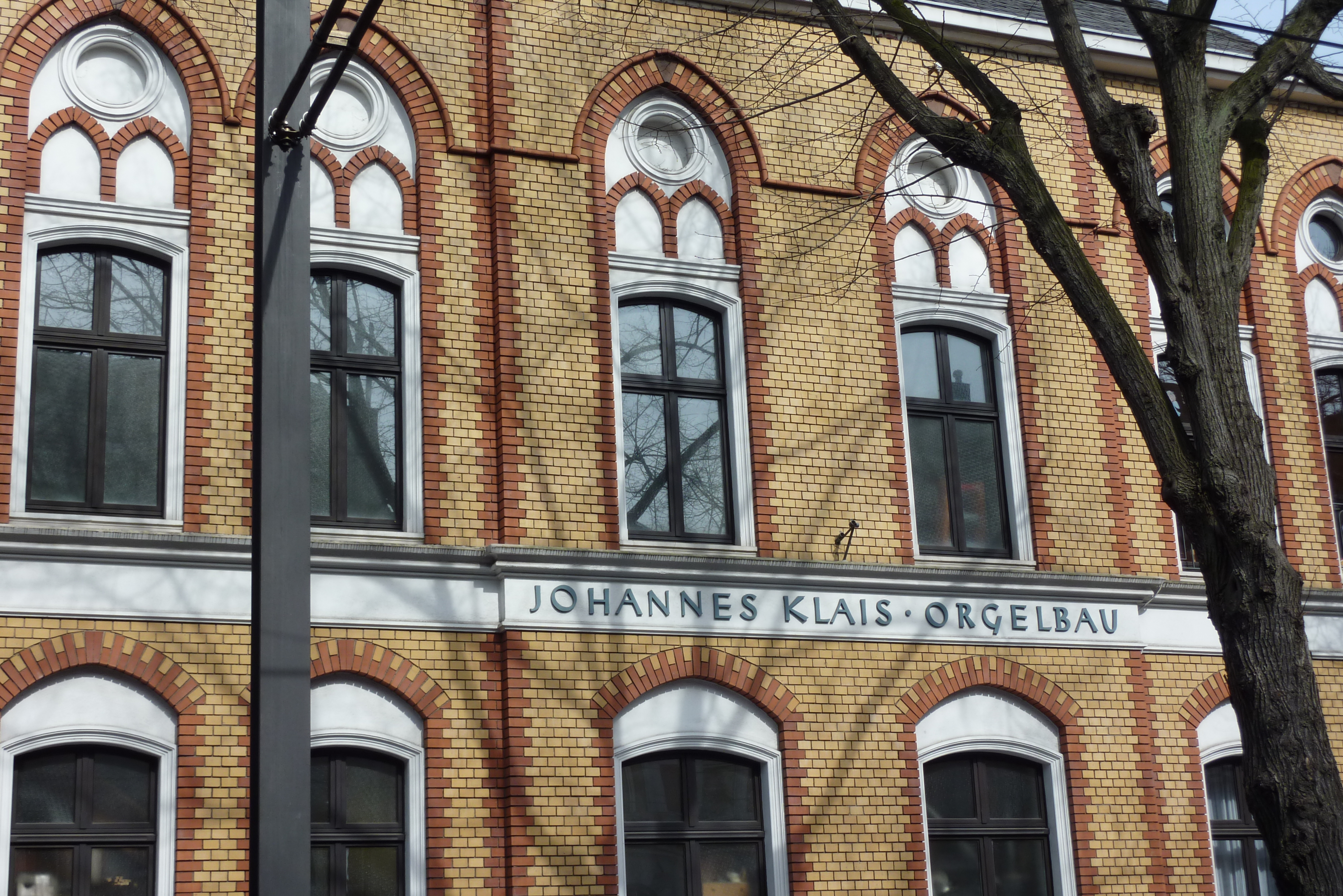
- Johannes Klais – Orgelbau, Kölnstr. 148. Bonn.
- Type: GmbH, Kommanditgesellschaft
- Founded: 1882
- Headquarters: Kölnstraße 148 • D 53111; Bonn, Germany
- Key people: Hans Gerd Klais; Philipp Klais
- Products: Pipe organs
- Website: klais.de

Orgelbau Klais is a German firm that designs, builds and restores pipe organs. It is a family run company, founded in 1882 by Johannes Klais senior and is now run by his great-grandson Philipp Klais. The firm is based in Bonn, Germany, and has completed many large-scale building and restoration projects around the globe in more than a century of organ building.

Wooden pipes stored in the workshop

== History ==
Johannes Klais, a skilled organ builder trained in Alsace, Switzerland, and Southern Germany, established his own workshop in Bonn in 1882. His craftsmanship was deeply rooted in traditional methods, particularly the use of slider windchests. However, even before the turn of the century, he demonstrated innovation by creating high-pressure stops with dual mouths on pneumatic cone valve chests. In 1906, alongside his son Hans, he introduced electric action to organ building.

Hans Klais succeeded his father in 1925. During his leadership, the company embraced modern influences, particularly in facade design, and made advancements in ergonomic console designs.

In 1965, Hans Gerd Klais, the founder's grandson, took over the business, followed by Philipp Klais, the founder's great-grandson, who became the fourth-generation manager of Orgelbau Klais.

The company gained international recognition for its restoration of the historic Bamboo Organ at St. Joseph's Parish in Las Piñas City, Philippines. The organ was transported to Germany in 1973, meticulously restored in 1974, and returned to the church in 1975. Beyond restoration, the company trained former church choirboys in organ building, who later established a local organ building and restoration workshop.

== Klais instruments around the world ==
Country	image	City	Location	Inauguration year	Pipes	Other
Argentina		Buenos Aires	Centro Cultural Kirchner			
Australia		Brisbane	Queensland Performing Arts Centre		6566	
Brazil		Catarina	Church of Rodeio			
China		Beijing	National Centre for the Performing Arts	2007	6500	94 stops. Largest organ in China.
Iceland		Reykjavík	Hallgrímskirkja		5275	
Germany		Aachen	Aachen Cathedral			
Germany			Beuron Archabbey church			
Germany		Cologne	Cologne Cathedral	1998		Although enormous, it is almost dwarfed inside the colossal Gothic church as it clings to the balconies. Klais also restored other organs in the cathedral and added a detached console that operates all of them at once.
Germany		Hamburg	Elbphilharmonie	2017	4765	4 manuals, 65 registers
Germany		Hamburg	St. Nicholas Church	2023		Connected, can be played from a remote location
Germany		Munich	St. Peter's church			
Germany		Münster	Münster Cathedral		approx. 7173	
Germany		Nuremberg	Frauenkirche			
Germany		Trier	Trier Cathedral	1974	5602	
Greece		Athens	Athens Concert Hall		6080	
Malaysia		Kuala Lumpur	Petronas Philharmonic Hall			
Poland		Kraków	Kraków Philharmonic Concert Hall			
Singapore			Esplanade Concert Hall		4740	61 registers
Spain		Zaragoza	Basilica of Our Lady del Pilar	2008	5391	Pipes inserted in a Renaissance (1529–1530) wooden frame.
United Kingdom		Bath, Somerset	Bath Abbey			
United Kingdom		Leeds	Leeds Cathedral			
United Kingdom		Westminster	St. John's, Smith Square			Redundant but still consecrated church which commissioned its organ when the building became a concert hall.
United Kingdom		Birmingham	Symphony Hall, Birmingham	2001	6000	Largest mechanical action organ in the UK.
United States of America		Columbus, Ohio	First Community Church	2022		4 manuals, 85 ranks. Dual consoles.
United States of America		Delaware, Ohio	Ohio Wesleyan University		4644	82 Ranks, 55 Stops.
United States of America		Madison, Wisconsin	Overture Hall			
United States of America		New York City	St. Peter's Lutheran Church	1978		2 manuals, 43 ranks.
United States of America		Iowa City, Iowa	University of Iowa Voxman Music Building Concert Hall	2016	3883	

== Sources ==
- Hans Gerd Klais: Beiträge zur Geschichte und Ästhetik der Orgel: Aus Anlass der Einhundertjahrfeier Orgelbau Johannes Klais Bonn, 1882–1982. Bonn 1983.
- Architecture of Music. Inspired pipe organs in world class buildings. Johannes Klais Orgelbau (Ed.), Bonn w.J.
- Horst Hodick: Johannes Klais (1852–1925); ein rheinischer Orgelbauer und sein Schaffen. Musikverlag Katzbichler, München/Salzburg 1993, ISBN 3-87397-139-9.
- Ludger Stühlmeyer: Orgelbau in Hof. In: Musica sacra, 133. Jg. Journal 2, Kassel 2013, pp 104–105.
