= Lindale Mall =

Shopping mall in Iowa

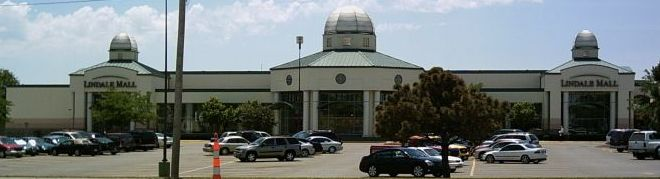
- Panoramic of Lindale Mall
- Location: Cedar Rapids, Iowa, United States
- Coordinates: 42.026°N 91.626°W
- Opened: September 15, 1960; 66 years ago
- Developer: Bernard Greenbaum
- Manager: Kohan Retail Investment Group
- Owner: Kohan Retail Investment Group
- Num. of stores: 108
- Num. of anchor tenants: 3 (2 open, 1 vacant)
- Floor area: 687,174 sq ft (63,840.6 m^{2})
- Floors: 2
- Public transit: Cedar Rapids Transit
- Website: lindalemall.com

Lindale Mall is an enclosed regional shopping mall on the northeast side of Cedar Rapids, Iowa, United States.

Lindale is anchored by Von Maur and Dick’s House of Sport. Outparcel properties include a free-standing Jo-Ann (occupying a former movie theater), a jewelry store as well as several restaurants.

There is also a Planet Fitness at the left of the main entrance

== History ==
On February 15, 1956, Sears and Younkers announced plans for a new open-air shopping center in northeast Cedar Rapids. These plans were opposed by downtown Cedar Rapids merchants, who formed an organization to oppose the rezoning of the land from residential to commercial use. The Cedar Rapids City Council eventually approved the rezoning, and Lindale Plaza opened on September 15, 1960. Sears, Younkers, and Killian's (a local department store) were Lindale's original anchors, with Sears relocating from downtown Cedar Rapids. Other early tenants included Kresge's, an Eagle supermarket, and Bishop's Buffet (which closed in September 2003). Sears and Younkers are the only two tenants who have continuously operated at Lindale since its opening.

Lindale Plaza became the enclosed Lindale Mall in 1980, shortly after Westdale Mall opened in southwest Cedar Rapids. The only anchor change in Lindale's history came in 1981, when Petersen Harned Von Maur replaced Killian's as the latter went bankrupt (its last store in downtown Cedar Rapids closed in November 1982). In August 1997, Lindale completed a $15 million expansion and renovation project that included construction of a new 500-stall parking ramp and a new 500-seat food court.

Lindale Plaza was built by Bernard Greenbaum and Associates, who also built Merle Hay Mall in Des Moines. Greenbaum later sold Lindale to General Growth Properties, who opened the Town & Country Shopping Center 1½ miles to the south in 1956. (Town & Country was Cedar Rapids' first strip mall and General Growth's first shopping center.) General Growth sold Lindale to the Equitable Life Assurance Society of the United States in 1984 as part of its real estate investment trust liquidation but continued to manage the mall until March 1998, when SDG Macerich — a partnership of the Simon Property Group and The Macerich Company — purchased Lindale Mall. In May 2014, Simon spun off the property into a separate company, Washington Prime Group, later becoming WP Glimcher in early 2015. Washington Prime Group currently owns and manages the mall.

In 2015, Sears Holdings spun off 235 of its properties, including the Sears at Lindale Mall, into Seritage Growth Properties.

On April 12, 2018, Sears announced that will close the Lindale Mall location in July. In addition, On April 18, 2018, it was announced that Younkers will close, as the parent, Bon-Ton Stores, is going out of business. The store closed on August 31, 2018. Both closures left Von Maur as the only remaining anchor. Part of the former Sears is expected to become Planet Fitness. In 2021, Washington Prime Group, the owners of the mall, filed for Chapter 11 bankruptcy.

On July 28, 2023, it was announced that Kohan Retail Investment Group had acquired the Lindale Mall for $28.5 million.

In 2025, plans were approved to have Dick's Sporting Goods construct one of their large format Dick's House of Sport locations in the former Sears space. Dick’s House of Sport opened to the public after renovating the former Sears department store into their new spoting goods store on June 3, 2026.
