= Coral Ridge Mall =

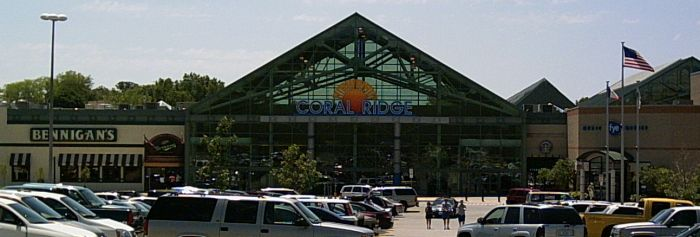
- Location: Coralville, Iowa, United States
- Coordinates: 41.691°N 91.603°W
- Address: 1451 Coral Ridge Avenue
- Opened: July 29, 1998; 28 years ago
- Developer: General Growth Properties
- Manager: GGP
- Owner: GGP
- Num. of stores: 114 (as of August 2008)
- Floor area: 1,187,097 ft^{2} (110,284.9 m^{2})
- Floors: 1 (2 in Scheels All Sports)
- Parking: 5,133 spaces
- Public transit: Coralville Transit: 21, 23, 24, 25
- Website: coralridgemall.com

Coral Ridge Mall is an enclosed super-regional shopping mall located just south of Interstate 80 in Coralville, Iowa. The mall's primary trade area includes Iowa City, Cedar Rapids, and other parts of eastern Iowa. It is owned, developed and managed by GGP (formerly General Growth Properties), which had become a subsidiary of Brookfield Properties in 2018.

The mall has a total floor area of 1,187,097 square feet (110,285 m^{2}), with a gross leasable area of 979,415 square feet (90,991 m^{2}). It also features a 1,000-seat food court with Wi-Fi internet access, a large "antique" carousel, a children's play area, and an NHL regulation-sized ice rink. While the ice rink is primarily used for public skating, the University of Iowa Hawkeyes hockey team plays most of its home games there.

== History ==
Coral Ridge Mall opened on July 29, 1998, with 100% of its floor space leased. It attracted one million visitors in its first 30 days and continues to attract roughly 10 million visitors a year. It also spawned additional retail development at the interchange of I-80 and Iowa Highway 965, now known as Coral Ridge Avenue. Big-box stores such as Kohl's, Lowe's, Dressbarn (closed in 2019) and a Wal-Mart Supercenter (currently branded as simply Walmart) have opened in the years following Coral Ridge's opening.

In 2013, Sears closed.

In July 2016, the former Sears was demolished to make way for six new stores.

In April 2017, Coral Ridge announced HomeGoods, Marshalls, PetSmart and Ulta Beauty opens in September.

On April 18, 2018, it was announced that Younkers will close, as the parent, Bon-Ton Stores, is going out of business.

On August 29, 2018, Younkers closed its doors permanently.

In March 2019, Five Below opens.

In November 2019, Ashley HomeStore opens in former Younkers.

On February 21, 2020, Tuesday Morning opens, which closed in April 2023.

In May 2020, Forever 21 closed permanently and Scheels expanded to that space along with 6 more store spaces.

In April 2021, H&M officially opened their second Iowa location in the mall.

In February 2023, Planet Fitness opened as a new junior anchor, taking over 5 store spaces.

== Economic impact ==
When Coral Ridge Mall was planned, Iowa City business owners were concerned that the mall would take business away from them. While taxable sales in Coralville increased from $171.2 million in 1998 to $314.6 million in 1999, sales in Iowa City increased from $701.1 million to $733.3 million in that same period. By 2006 taxable sales in Coralville would grow to $549.7 million while sales in Iowa City grew to $901.4 million. However, a 2000 report by Iowa State University economics professor Kenneth Stone stated that 18 eastern Iowa counties lost over $120 million in retail sales to Johnson County in Coral Ridge's first year. In addition, despite the overall increase in taxable sales, general merchandise and apparel sales in Iowa City declined between 1997 and 2007.

Several malls in eastern Iowa, including Old Capitol Mall in downtown Iowa City and Westdale Mall in Cedar Rapids, saw an increased number of store closings after Coral Ridge Mall opened. Most of Coral Ridge Mall's anchors, except for Younkers and Dillard's, relocated from other shopping centers in the Iowa City area; Younkers ran two stores in Johnson County before closing its Old Capitol Mall store in January 2005. By 2008, Old Capitol Mall and Sycamore Mall in Iowa City would rebound to 95 percent occupancy under local ownership while downtown Iowa City merchants began to focus on specialty retail.

Coral Ridge Mall was built in a tax increment financing district. The Des Moines Register reported on August 13, 2006, that the city of Coralville was using the $7 million in property taxes generated by the mall to pay off long-term debts on a new hotel and convention center instead of using it for local services.

== Incidents ==
On June 12, 2015, at approximately 7:30PM, a 20-year-old woman who worked at the Iowa Children's Museum was shot at her place of employment near the food court area. She was transported to University of Iowa Hospitals and Clinics where she died a short time later. An eyewitness, who worked at a kiosk in the mall, said the shooter was a mall security guard who had allegedly been fired for harassing the victim earlier in the day.
