= Westdale Town Center =

Coordinates: 41.952°N 91.720°W

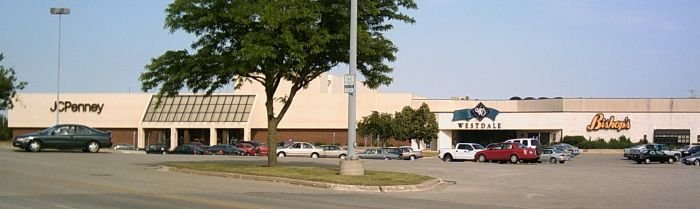
- Westdale Mall in 2006
- Location: Cedar Rapids, Iowa, United States
- Opened: October 4, 1979; 47 years ago
- Closed: March 24, 2014; 12 years ago
- Developer: The Hahn Company
- Manager: Frew Development Group
- Owner: A. Shapiro, LLC
- Num. of stores: 50
- Num. of anchor tenants: 7 (6 open, 1 vacant)
- Floor area: 854,000 ft² (79,000 m²)
- Floors: 2
- Parking: 5,500 spaces
- Public transit: Cedar Rapids Transit

Westdale Town Center, formerly Westdale Mall is a formerly enclosed super-regional shopping mall in Cedar Rapids, Iowa, United States. The two-level mall on the southwest side of Cedar Rapids is one of the city's two enclosed malls, along with Lindale Mall on the city's northeast side. By 2012, Westdale displayed some characteristics of a dead mall as two of its four anchor stores and an estimated 70 percent of inline stores have been vacated as of January 2013. At the beginning of 2013, local investor group A. Shapiro LLC purchased Westdale Mall. In January 2013, Frew Development Group, LLC leased the mall and its property from A. Shapiro, LLC. Frew Development is investing $90 million into the redevelopment of the mall, converting it to an open air destination and re-branding it as Westdale Town Center. In 2020, Frew Development Group, LLC acquired the ground lease from A. Shapiro, LLC and today is the sole owner of Westdale Town Center. The mall's anchor stores are JCPenney, Ross Dress for Less, U-Haul, Burlington, and PetSmart. Since 2018, Frew has developed a Tru by Hilton hotel, a Home2 by Hilton, a Boulder Tap House restaurant, and a US Veteran's Medical Clinic.

== History ==
=== Planning and construction ===
Plans for Westdale Mall were first announced on March 29, 1972. Original plans called for a 560,000-square-foot (52,000 m^{2}) mall with two or three anchor stores and 30 to 50 smaller stores on 66 acres (270,000 m^{2}) of land. Later that year, developer Ernest W. Hahn of The Hahn Company acquired the mall's property from Midwest Development of Cedar Rapids and Dial Realty of Omaha, Nebraska. In 1974, Hahn asked the Cedar Rapids City Council to rezone an additional 21 acres (85,000 m^{2}) of land from residential to commercial use. An organization of citizens known as "Taxpayers for Sensible Planning" opposed the rezoning, claiming that construction of a larger mall would have a severe impact on existing businesses in the Cedar Rapids area. Despite the opposition, the City Council approved the rezoning by a 4–1 vote on May 22, 1974. The recession of 1974 delayed the start of construction until May 1976 and a seven-week electricians' strike delayed the mall's opening to October 4, 1979.

Despite the construction problems and layoffs in Cedar Rapids' manufacturing sector during the recession of 1980, Westdale Mall was at 93 percent capacity with 114 stores by the beginning of 1981. Westdale attracted shoppers from counties throughout eastern Iowa and surrounding states, including cities such as Davenport and Waterloo that already had enclosed malls.

=== Anchor and ownership changes ===
JCPenney, Montgomery Ward, Younkers, and Brandeis signed on as anchors before construction of Westdale Mall began, but Brandeis withdrew from the mall while its store was still under construction. Wards and JCPenney, which both relocated from downtown Cedar Rapids, were the first two anchor stores to open while Younkers and Petersen Harned Von Maur (Brandeis' replacement) opened in 1980. Wards closed in early 2001 as the chain ceased operations, and the anchor space remained vacant for more than four years until Steve & Barry's opened there in November 2005. On January 31, 2007, Von Maur closed its Westdale Mall store due to a decline in business and offered its 80 employees positions at its Lindale Mall and Iowa City locations. That anchor space remains vacant. Steve and Barry's closed in November 2008 due to the chain's bankruptcy, leaving Westdale with only two anchors at the beginning of 2010.

Westdale Mall was built by The Hahn Company, which became TrizecHahn in 1980; TrizecHahn sold Westdale to The Rouse Company in April 1998. The Festival Companies of Los Angeles, California, took over management of Westdale in November 2004. Shortly after that, Festival announced a $20 million renovation plan that would expand the mall and add a new food court. However, those plans never materialized as tenants continued to leave the mall amid competition from Coral Ridge Mall 20 miles (32 km) to the south. In November 2006, Westdale was placed in administrative receivership after H-N-W Associates, a part-owner of the mall, fell behind on its mortgage payments. Heritage Property Management of Cedar Rapids took over management of the mall at the time. In December 2006, General Growth Properties (owner of Coral Ridge Mall) took over the leasing duties for the mall. Westdale was sold to Cedar Rapids Properties, Inc., in a sheriff's sale on July 10, 2007. The former Steve & Barry's space, which was originally owned by Montgomery Ward when it was an anchor, was separately owned by California-based City Gate LP. General Growth handed the leasing duties over to Jones Lang LaSalle in mid-2010.

By March 2007, over 50% of the mall stores had closed. The Cedar Rapids City Council voted to delay any major redevelopment work at the mall for six months, in the hopes that whoever purchases the mall property does not break it apart. On May 9, 2007, the City Council voted 7-1 to lift the moratorium on a mostly vacant outparcel building that was originally built as an Econofoods supermarket and was more recently a Big Lots store; two local developers planned to reconfigure that building and build a Sonic Drive-In and T.G.I. Friday's on the property. However, in September 2007 T.G.I. Friday's canceled its plans to open a restaurant at that location amid concerns that they would not make enough money there. Sonic also backed out of its plan to open a restaurant at that location shortly after that. The city council later reimposed the development moratorium before they unanimously agreed to set it aside on December 19, 2007. The Big Lots outparcel building was demolished in March 2010 to make room for Edgewood Station, a new 25,000-square-foot (2,000 m^{2}) development that is expected to include at least two restaurants and a financial institution.

=== Flood of 2008 and aftermath ===
Some of Westdale Mall's empty stores had been used as temporary homes for city and Linn County offices in the aftermath of the Iowa flood of 2008. Disaster centers for the American Red Cross, FEMA, and the Small Business Administration were also set up at Westdale. After rejecting an $18.5 million offer to buy Westdale outright on January 21, 2009, the Linn County Board of Supervisors agreed to move their offices to the former Steve & Barry's space on February 11, 2009. In June 2010, Linn County signed a lease agreement to keep its "Linn County West" office complex at Westdale until at least February 2012. The Linn County offices that were housed at Westdale moved back to downtown Cedar Rapids in June 2012.

On February 9, 2009, the Cedar Rapids Public Library opened a temporary library known as "The Bridge" inside space that was formerly the home of an Osco Drug store at Westdale. "The Bridge" is serving as the main operations for the library, whose main branch downtown was heavily damaged by the flood, until a permanent decision on the library's future is made. The library announced plans to move its west-side branch from Westdale to a former Target store west of the mall in February 2012.

The mall now has JCPenney and Burlington as anchors as part of the redevelopment.

=== Sale and redevelopment plans ===
Investor group A. Shapiro LLC, an investor group led by local realtor Scott Byers, acquired Westdale Mall in a transaction that took effect on January 1, 2013. Development was handed over to the Denver-based Frew Development Group as part of the sale. Frew plans to invest $90 million to redevelop the Westdale Mall site.

Plans call for demolishing most of the current mall except for the JCPenney, Younkers, and vacant Von Maur anchors, and turning the site into a "multiuse destination" similar to the Streets at Southglenn in Colorado and Jordan Creek Town Center in Des Moines. While the mall remains open, redevelopment was expected to begin in the first quarter of 2013 with the demolition of the former Montgomery Ward/Steve & Barry's building.

The mall remained open until March 31, 2014, at which point all tenants moved out except for JCPenney, Younkers, and a City Looks hair salon. The mall was then demolished except for the anchor stores.

On January 31, 2018, The Bon-Ton announced that Younkers would be closing in April 2018 as part of a plan to close 42 stores nationwide which left JCPenney as the only anchor left.

=== Incidents ===
On December 19, 1979, just two months after the mall opened, 18-year-old Michelle Martinko was killed in the mall's parking lot. Jerry Lynn Burns was arrested in 2018 on the 39th anniversary of the murder, and he was convicted of first-degree murder on February 24, 2020.
