= Voxman Music Building =

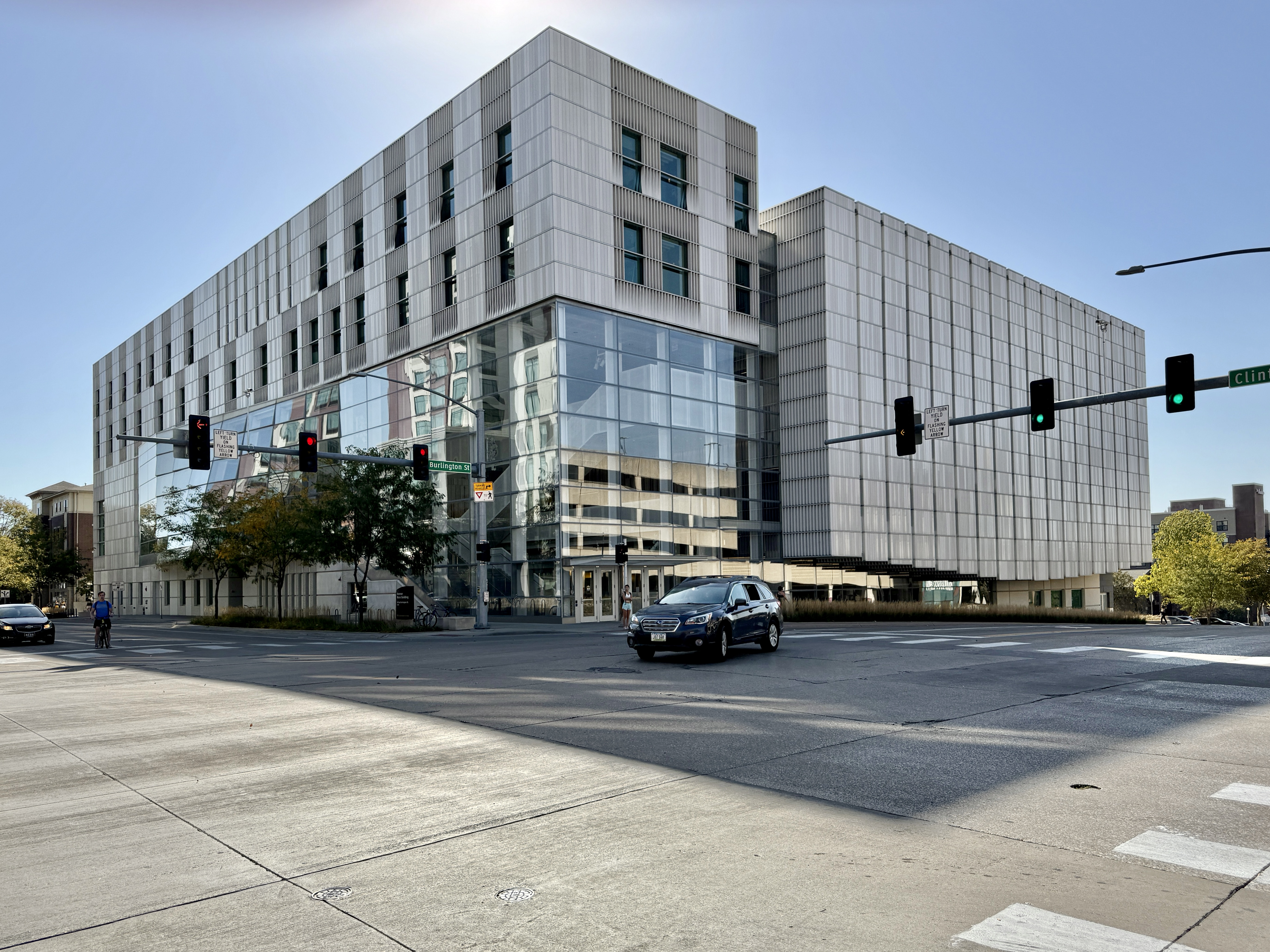
- Exterior view of the north and east sides of the Voxman music building.
- Interactive map of the Voxman Music Building area

General information
- Location: Iowa City, Iowa, 93 E Burlington St, Iowa City, United States of America
- Coordinates: 41°39′28.35″N 91°32′5.04″W
- Named for: Himie Voxman
- Inaugurated: Oct 21, 2016
- Cost: $152 million
- Owner: University of Iowa

Height
- Top floor: 5

Technical details
- Floor count: 6
- Floor area: 190,000 sq-ft

Design and construction
- Architects: LMN Architects and Neumann Monson PC

The Voxman Music Building is an academic building of the University of Iowa in Iowa City, Iowa, United States. The building is named in honor of former clarinetist and University of Iowa director of the school of music, Himie Voxman.

== History ==
The original Voxman Music Building, located on the bank of the Iowa River, was destroyed in the Iowa flood of 2008. In late 2009, a new location for the new music building was formally announced and, shortly afterwards, funding was approved by the Iowa Board of Regents. In December 2013, the Board of Regents voted that the new building would retain the Voxman name. The building officially opened to the public in October 2016.

== Performing spaces ==
The Voxman Music Building contains to a 700-seat concert hall, a 200-seat recital hall, and a 75-seat organ hall.

=== Klais organ ===
The building's 700-seat concert hall contains a Klais organ composed of 3,883 individual pipes.
