= Burlington Rail Bridge =

Historic vertical-lift railroad bridge

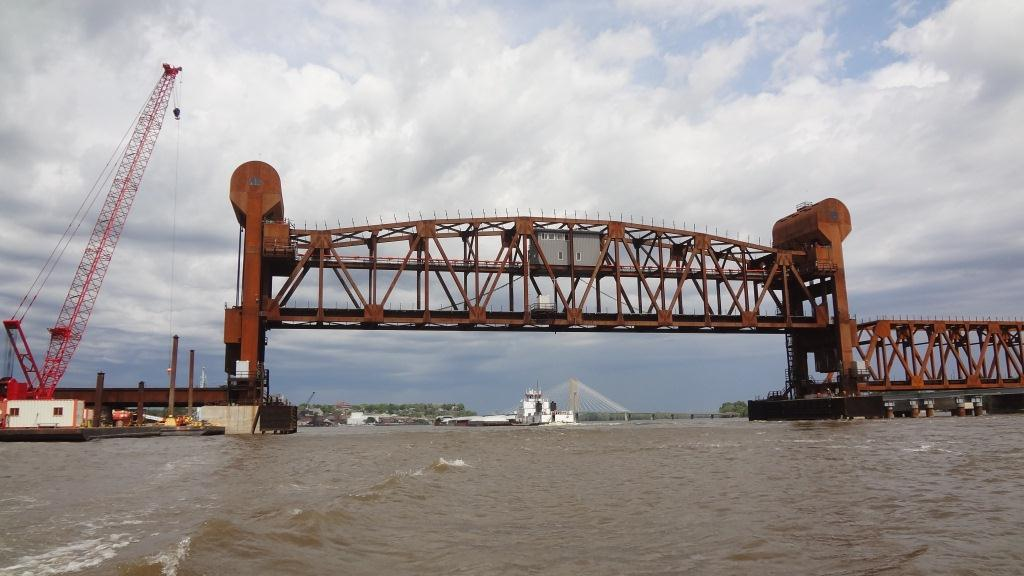
- The bridge's lift span in 2013
- Coordinates: 40°47′55″N 91°05′31″W
- Carries: BNSF and the Amtrak California Zephyr
- Crosses: Mississippi River
- Locale: Burlington, Iowa and Gulfport, Illinois
- Official name: BNSF Br. 204.66
- Maintained by: BNSF Railway

Characteristics
- Design: Five 250-foot (76 m) fixed trusses; one 370-foot (110 m) vertical-lift truss span; two deck plate girder spans
- Total length: 2,145 feet (654 m)
- Width: 34 feet 6 inches (10.52 m)
- Longest span: 370 feet (110 m) (lift span)
- Clearance above: 19.5 ft (5.9 m) (closed); 44.1 ft (13.4 m) (open) over 2% flowline

Rail characteristics
- No. of tracks: 2

History
- Opened: 1867 (original); 1893 (replacement); 2010 (second replacement)

Statistics
- Daily traffic: 20.0 trains per day (as of 2014)

The Burlington Bridge is a vertical-lift railroad bridge across the Mississippi River between Burlington, Iowa, and Gulfport, Illinois, United States. It is owned by BNSF Railway and carries two tracks which are part of BNSF's Chicago–Denver main line.

The current bridge is the third that has existed at the same location. The first, a single-track swing bridge constructed in iron—the first all-metal structure to cross the Mississippi—opened in 1868, in the federal reconstruction phase post the American Civil War. Built as part of the network of the Chicago, Burlington and Quincy Railroad (CBQ)—commonly known as the Burlington Route—it formed an important part of the federal railroad route between Chicago and Denver. Due to increasing traffic levels, in 1893 the CBQ reconstructed the bridge as a double-track, and it was further strengthened in the 1930s to allow for heavier freight cars. The CBQ later became part of Burlington Northern Railroad in 1970, and later BNSF. Amtrak's California Zephyr crosses this bridge.

On May 1, 2008, five fully loaded barges broke loose during a period of high water. One struck the bridge and became lodged under it. The bridge was closed until midday on May 2, when one track was opened after it was deemed safe. The barge was removed during the afternoon of May 3 and the other track was reopened that evening bringing the bridge back to full use to carry the dozens of trains that cross it daily. In the same year, the United States Coast Guard declared the bridge a danger to navigable traffic. This meant both that the bridge had to be replaced, and that funding for such could be eligible for federal funds.

Following the passing of the American Recovery and Reinvestment Act of 2009, and a successful application for federal funding supported by the Coast Guard, the BNSF Railway began work to replace the bridge in late 2009. The project was split into two phases, with the lift span being built first by Ames Construction, of Burnsville, Minnesota, and the approach trusses built by the Walsh Construction Company of Chicago, Illinois. The lift span was complete and operational by February 2011, while the remainder of the bridge was not officially dedicated until October 2012.

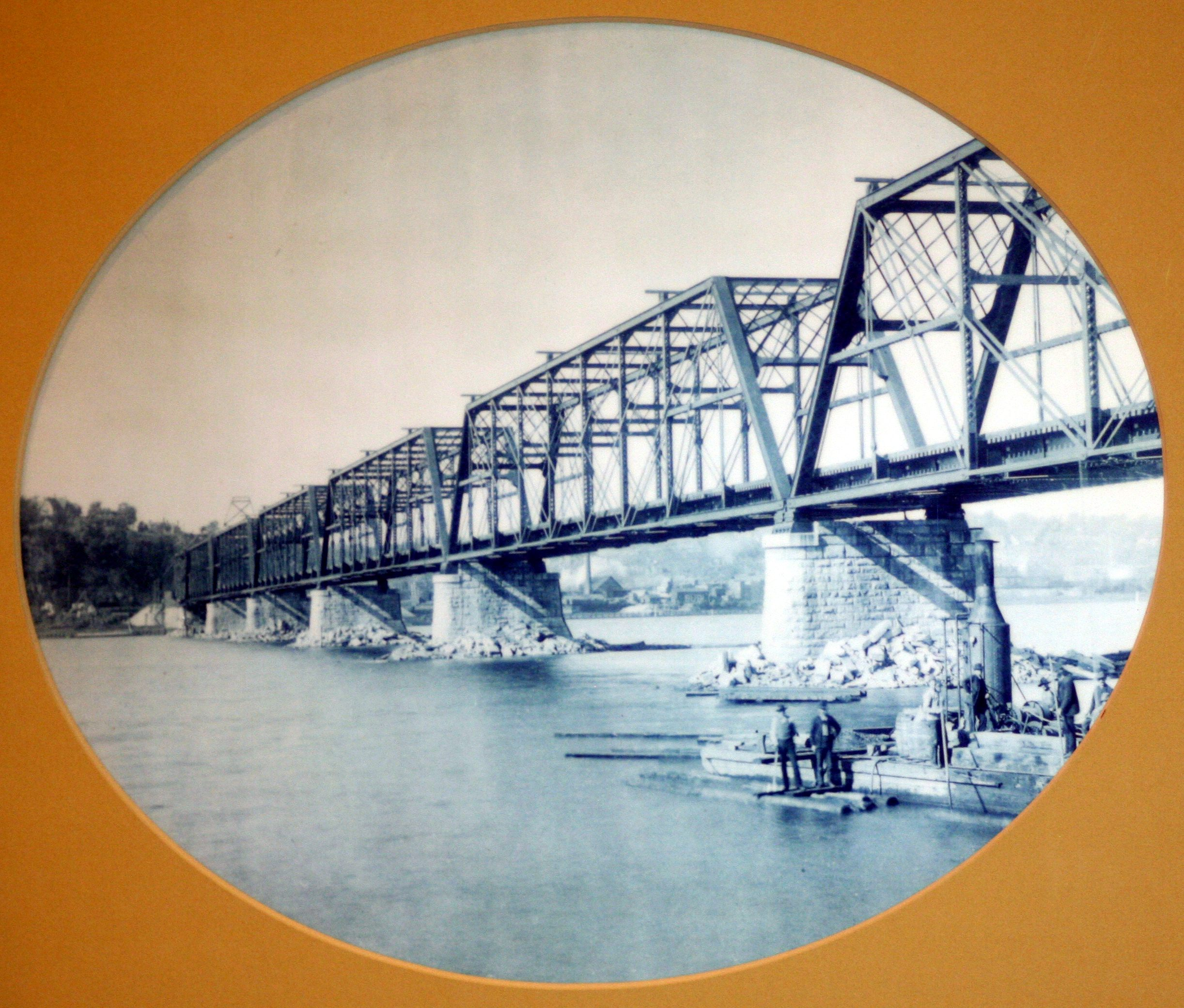
The Burlington (C. B. & Q. Railroad) bridge in 1891

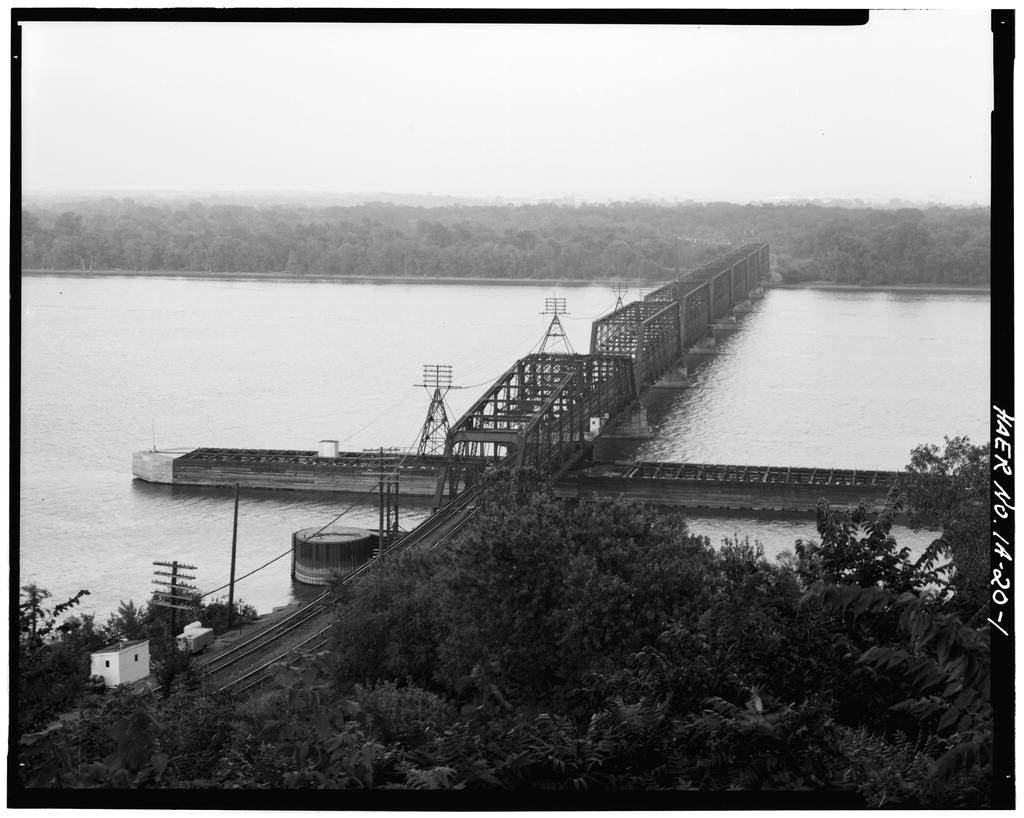
The Burlington Rail Bridge in 1985, showing the long pier on which the swing span pivoted

== See also ==
- List of crossings of the Upper Mississippi River
- List of bridges documented by the Historic American Engineering Record in Illinois
- List of bridges documented by the Historic American Engineering Record in Iowa
