= Cedar Rapids Police Department (Iowa) =

- Abbreviation: CRPD

Jurisdictional structure
- Operations jurisdiction: Cedar Rapids, Iowa, United States
- Map of Cedar Rapids Police Department's jurisdiction
- General nature: Local civilian police

Operational structure
- Headquarters: 505 1st Street SW; Cedar Rapids, Iowa
- Sworn members: 212
- Unsworn members: 60
- Agency executive: David Dostal, Chief of Police

Website
- Cedar Rapids Police Department

The Cedar Rapids Police Department is the municipal police department for the city of Cedar Rapids, Iowa, United States.

== History ==
Early historical records from the 1840s indicate that a lone constable served the Cedar Rapids population. By 1883, the Cedar Rapids Police Department had grown to 12 police officers. In 1948, the department completed an FM police radio installation which allowed all emergency services to communicate with each other.

== Substation ==
The department has a substation located at 1233 1st Avenue SE, Cedar Rapids. Opened in 2009, the substation is also known as the Community Connections Resource Center. It serves as a space for police officers to complete reports and other duties, and is also used by employees of the Willis Dady Emergency Homeless shelter and for community meetings and events.

== November 2016 shooting by an officer ==
On November 1, 2016, Officer Lucas Jones made a traffic stop and shot a motorist, Jerime Mitchell, paralysing him from the neck down. Upon a search of Mitchell's vehicle, one pound (0.45 kg) of marijuana, $1,500 in cash, and scales were located. Police also reviewed Mitchell's cell phone records and discovered text messages in which he planned to sell the marijuana to a customer. Officer Jones was cleared of criminal charges by a grand jury. The incident gained national attention.

== Officers killed ==
In the history of the Cedar Rapids Police Department, six officers have been killed while on duty.
