= Katie Beckett Medicaid waiver =

Medicaid waiver

President Ronald Reagan meets Katie Beckett, along with her parents, Julie and Mark Beckett as the President exits Air Force One on the tarmac of Cedar Rapids Municipal Airport, Iowa, 20 September 1984. Photograph by official White House photographer Michael Evans, courtesy of the Ronald Reagan Presidential Library.

A Katie Beckett waiver or TEFRA waiver is a Medicaid waiver concerning the income eligibility for home-based Medicaid services for children under the age of nineteen. Prior to the Katie Beckett waiver, if a child with significant medical needs received treatment at home, the child's income would be deemed to include the parents' entire financial resources for the purposes of determining Medicaid eligibility. Only after a hospitalization lasting more than thirty days would the parents' income no longer be associated with the child, allowing the child to then qualify for Medicaid coverage. The effect was that many families, unable to afford home treatment, kept their children in costly hospital settings in order to meet the Medicaid 30-day requirement. Katie Beckett waivers allow Medicaid to cover medical services for children in the home, regardless of the parents' income, in cases where home-based treatment will cost less than or the same as treatment in a hospital.

The waiver is named for Katie Beckett, a three-year-old who was hospitalized from infancy so she could receive ventilator assistance after a viral encephalitis infection left her partially paralyzed in a way that affected her ability to breathe. When her situation came to the attention of the newly elected Reagan administration, then preparing its first budget, the administration seized the story as a way to deregulate and reduce the costs of Medicaid.

The waiver is also called a TEFRA waiver because it was passed as a provision of the Tax Equity and Fiscal Responsibility Act of 1982. Disabled people can transition to Medicaid Home and Home and Community-Based Services Waivers after age nineteen.

== Background and enactment ==
Mary Katherine Beckett was born on 9 March 1978 in St. Luke's Hospital, Cedar Rapids, Iowa, to parents Julie and Mark Beckett. At four months, she contracted viral encephalitis. The brain inflammation put her in a coma and left her partially paralyzed in a way that affected her ability to breathe and with grand mal seizures. Her difficulty breathing required her to be on a ventilator most hours of the day.

Beckett and her family were friends with Garret Frey, another ventilator-using child from Cedar Rapids who was subject to the Supreme Court ruling Cedar Rapids Community School District v Garret F..

Beckett lived until age 34, triple the age forecasted by her physicians. She died on 18 May 2012 in the same hospital in which she was born.

== See also ==
- Least restrictive environment
- Medicaid waiver
- Medicaid Home and Home and Community-Based Services Waivers
- Olmstead v. L.C.

== Bibliography ==
- Musumeci, Mary Beth (March 2011). "Modernizing Medicaid Eligibility Criteria for Children with Significant Disabilities: Moving from a Disabling to an Enabling Paradigm". American Journal of Law and Medicine. 37 (1): 81–127. doi:10.1177/009885881103700103. PMID 21614996. S2CID 7758714.
- Semansky, Rafael M.; Koyanagi, Chris (July 2004). "The TEFRA Medicaid Eligibility Option for Children with Severe Disabilities: A National Study". The Journal of Behavioral Health Services & Research. 31 (3): 334–342. doi:10.1007/BF02287295. PMID 15263871. S2CID 9236244.
- Smith, David G.; Moore, Judith D. (2015). Medicaid Politics and Policy (Second ed.). New Brunswick, N.J.: Transaction Publishers. ISBN 978-1-4128-5674-4.
