= Robins, Iowa =

- City
- Motto: "Community. Family. Friends."
- Location of Robins, Iowa
- Coordinates: 42°04′48″N 91°40′35″W
- Country: United States
- State: Iowa
- County: Linn

Area
  - Total: 5.98 sq mi (15.50 km^{2})
  - Land: 5.97 sq mi (15.47 km^{2})
  - Water: 0.0077 sq mi (0.02 km^{2})
- Elevation: 853 ft (260 m)

Population (2020)
  - Total: 3,353
  - Density: 561.2/sq mi (216.67/km^{2})
- Time zone: UTC-6 (Central (CST))
  - Summer (DST): UTC-5 (CDT)
- ZIP code: 52328
- Area code: 319
- FIPS code: 19-67800
- GNIS feature ID: 2396389
- Website: www.cityofrobins.org

Robins is a city in Linn County, Iowa, United States. The population was 3,353 at the time of the 2020 census. It is a suburb of Cedar Rapids and part of the Cedar Rapids Metropolitan Statistical Area.

== Geography ==
According to the United States Census Bureau, the city has a total area of 5.84 square miles (15.13 km^{2}), of which 5.83 square miles (15.10 km^{2}) is land and 0.01 square miles (0.03 km^{2}) is water.

== Demographics ==
Historical populations
Year	Pop.	±%
1920	110	—
1930	190	+72.7%
1940	205	+7.9%
1950	272	+32.7%
1960	426	+56.6%
1970	663	+55.6%
1980	726	+9.5%
1990	875	+20.5%
2000	1,806	+106.4%
2010	3,142	+74.0%
2020	3,353	+6.7%
"U.S. Census website". United States Census Bureau. and Iowa Data Center; Source: U.S. Decennial Census

=== 2020 census ===
As of the 2020 census, Robins had a population of 3,353. The median age was 46.7 years. 23.4% of residents were under the age of 18. For every 100 females, there were 98.5 males, and for every 100 females age 18 and over, there were 102.4 males.

82.2% of residents lived in urban areas, while 17.8% lived in rural areas.

There were 1,207 households and 1,035 families in Robins, of which 33.3% had children under the age of 18 living in them. Of all households, 80.7% were married-couple households, 8.5% were households with a male householder and no spouse or partner present, and 8.0% were households with a female householder and no spouse or partner present. About 11.6% of all households were made up of individuals, and 5.7% had someone living alone who was 65 years of age or older. Cohabitating-couple households made up 2.7% of households, and 14.3% of households were non-families.

There were 1,250 housing units, of which 3.4% were vacant. The homeowner vacancy rate was 0.6% and the rental vacancy rate was 9.8%.

The population density was 561.2 inhabitants per square mile (216.7/km^{2}). The average housing-unit density was 209.2 per square mile (80.8/km^{2}).

26.2% of residents were under the age of 20. 4.6% were between the ages of 20 and 24, 16.7% were from 25 to 44, 34.9% were from 45 to 64, and 17.6% were 65 years of age or older. The gender makeup of the city was 49.6% male and 50.4% female.

Racial composition as of the 2020 census
Race	Number	Percent
White	3,109	92.7%
Black or African American	23	0.7%
American Indian and Alaska Native	2	0.1%
Asian	68	2.0%
Native Hawaiian and Other Pacific Islander	1	0.0%
Some other race	24	0.7%
Two or more races	126	3.8%
Hispanic or Latino (of any race)	61	1.8%

=== 2010 census ===
As of the census of 2010, there were 3,142 people, 1,034 households, and 911 families living in the city. The population density was 538.9 inhabitants per square mile (208.1/km^{2}). There were 1,072 housing units at an average density of 183.9 per square mile (71.0/km^{2}). The racial makeup of the city was 95.6% White, 0.7% African American, 0.1% Native American, 2.1% Asian, 0.1% Pacific Islander, 0.5% from other races, and 1.0% from two or more races. Hispanic or Latino of any race were 1.3% of the population.

There were 1,034 households, of which 46.5% had children under the age of 18 living with them, 83.8% were married couples living together, 1.8% had a female householder with no husband present, 2.4% had a male householder with no wife present, and 11.9% were non-families. 8.6% of all households were made up of individuals, and 3.5% had someone living alone who was 65 years of age or older. The average household size was 3.04 and the average family size was 3.23.

The median age in the city was 39.1 years. 31.1% of residents were under the age of 18; 4.7% were between the ages of 18 and 24; 24.5% were from 25 to 44; 31.6% were from 45 to 64; and 8% were 65 years of age or older. The gender makeup of the city was 51.1% male and 48.9% female.

=== 2000 census ===
As of the census of 2000, there were 1,806 people, 592 households, and 520 families living in the city. The population density was 472.3 inhabitants per square mile (182.4/km^{2}). There were 603 housing units at an average density of 157.7 per square mile (60.9/km^{2}). The racial makeup of the city was 98.17% White, 0.17% Native American, 0.50% Asian, 0.11% from other races, and 1.05% from two or more races. Hispanic or Latino of any race were 1.38% of the population.

There were 592 households, out of which 46.5% had children under the age of 18 living with them, 83.6% were married couples living together, 2.2% had a female householder with no husband present, and 12.0% were non-families. 9.3% of all households were made up of individuals, and 1.9% had someone living alone who was 65 years of age or older. The average household size was 3.05 and the average family size was 3.27.

In the city, the population was spread out, with 33.0% under the age of 18, 4.5% from 18 to 24, 30.5% from 25 to 44, 26.5% from 45 to 64, and 5.6% who were 65 years of age or older. The median age was 37 years. For every 100 females, there were 109.8 males. For every 100 females age 18 and over, there were 108.6 males.

The median income for a household in the city was $74,211, and the median income for a family was $76,666. Males had a median income of $51,520 versus $33,500 for females. The per capita income for the city was $25,078. About 0.4% of families and 1.2% of the population were below the poverty line, including 1.2% of those under age 18 and none of those age 65 or over.

== Education ==
Most of Robins is in the Cedar Rapids Community School District.

Zoned schools for Robins:

- Elementary schools: Hiawatha and Nixon elementaries in Hiawatha
- Secondary schools: Harding Middle School and Kennedy High School
