= Metro High School =

Metro High School may refer to:

- Metro High School (Iowa) — Cedar Rapids, Iowa
- Metro Academic and Classical High School — St. Louis, Missouri
- Metro Early College High School — Columbus, Ohio
