= Mental health reform in North Carolina =

North Carolina

The state of North Carolina is undertaking a comprehensive policy shift on how the government budgets for and manages resources for mental health, developmental disability, and substance abuse services. The 1915 (b)(c) Medicaid Waiver Program was chosen by the North Carolina Department of Health & Human Services, Division of Medical Assistance as a way to control and more accurately budget for the rising costs of Medicaid funded services. The 1915 (b)(c) Waiver Program was initially implemented at one pilot site in 2005 and evaluated for several years. Two expansion sites were then added in 2012. Full statewide implementation is expected by July 1, 2013.

== Mental health reform history ==
In October 2001, the North Carolina General Assembly ratified House Bill 381 (S.L. 2001-437) on Mental Health System Reform.

[The law] required local jurisdictions to separate the management of mental health services from the delivery of those services. Previously, local entities such as counties and regional agencies delivered mental health services by directly employing the care providers. The 2001 law required the governmental local management entities (LMEs) to contract with private providers to serve area residents who needed mental health services. The local counties and regions no longer directly controlled the provision of services, but instead were responsible for managing provider contracts.

Since that time, the state has undertaken additional mental health system reform actions. On January 1, 2002 the NC Division of Medical Assistance (DMA) entered into a contract with ValueOptions Inc. (a private for-profit company) to provide utilization review services for the then 1.3 million Medicaid recipients in North Carolina. The state renewed that contract in 2006 and 2011. ValueOptions provides prior authorization for mental health and substance abuse services.

There were significant criticisms of state's shift to privatization, including:

- Many highly trained mental health care workers left the field as private providers took control of service delivery, decimating the professional public sector workforce.
- The fragmented system created through privatization had a tremendous negative impact on the quality of services provided to clients. Many times, important mental health services were no longer even available to clients.
- Private providers engaged in "cherry picking," offering only the most profitable services, such as "community support" services. These services include basic assistance and mentoring, and such tasks as running errands for a client or helping with a child's homework. They could be performed by low-paid, unlicensed personnel. Many providers focused on these highly profitable community support services and left seriously ill clients without the more costly care they needed.
- Reports of cost overruns estimate that the state wasted at least $400 million in community support services offered by private providers that were unnecessary for the client or not even performed. As a result of the treatment offered by the private providers, the number of North Carolinians with mental illness who ended up in emergency rooms or jails significantly increased.

Additionally, the budget for Medicaid funded services was not adequately managed and continued to grow at a high rate each year.

Starting in 2005, the state established one LME as a pilot Medicaid managed care vendor through the use of the Medicaid 1915 (b)(c) Waiver Program. Piedmont Behavioral Health (PBH) served as the pilot program and serves Cabarrus, Davidson, Rowan, Stanly, and Union counties. In 2008, the General Assembly supported the planned expansion of the pilot program through S.L. 2008-107. Then S.L. 2010-31 was adopted and required the designation of two additional expansion sites. Most recently, S.L. 2011-264 instructed the North Carolina Department of Health and Human Services (NC DHHS) to proceed with the statewide restructuring of the mental health, developmental disabilities, and substance abuse services system by implementing the 1915 (b)(c) Waiver Program statewide by July 1, 2013.

Area authorities, like PBH, were originally designated by the state of North Carolina in 1985 through the NC Mental Health, Developmental Disabilities, Substance Abuse Service Act. The name change to Local Management Entity (LME) took place in 2001 when North Carolina passed the Mental Health System Reform Act. Authority for LMEs is organized under North Carolina General Statute Chapter 122C. LMEs are considered a local political subdivision of the state per §122C-116. According to G.S. §122C-115.4, LMEs are responsible for management and oversight of the public system of mental health, developmental disabilities, and substance abuse services at the community level.

== Motivation for reform ==
Medicaid "is a health insurance program for low-income individuals and families who cannot afford health care costs. Medicaid serves low-income parents, children, seniors, and people with disabilities." According to the Fiscal Research Division of the N.C. General Assembly, "Medicaid is the fastest growing program in the state budget. In 2009, the authorized state budget for Medicaid was $3.2 billion, or 15% of the state's $21.2 billion authorized operating budget—an increase of 9% from 2008." The Centers for Medicare and Medicaid Services report that in 2009 (the last year for which data was available) North Carolina had 1,974,287 enrollees in Medicaid. 1.97 million enrollees equaled 21% of the state's population that year (9,380,884).

== Medicaid history in North Carolina ==
Centers for Medicare and Medicaid Services (Medicaid administrator) logo

"Title XIX of the Social Security Act is a federal and state entitlement program that pays for medical assistance for certain individuals and families with low incomes and resources. This program, known as Medicaid, became law in 1965 as a cooperative venture jointly funded by the federal and state governments...to assist states in furnishing medical assistance to needy persons. Within broad national guidelines established by federal statutes, regulations and policies, each state 1) establishes its own eligibility standards, 2) determines the type, amount, duration, and scope of services, 3) sets the rate of payment for services, and 4) administers its own program."

North Carolina submitted its "Medicaid State Plan to the Health Care Financing Administration in 1969 and received approval that year. North Carolina General Statute Chapter 108A is the law that implemented Title XIX in North Carolina...on January 1, 1970. Each year new legislation that is passed by the North Carolina General Assembly establishes changes to the program and its policies such as eligibility and benefit coverage expansions and contractions, management and administrative mandates, special funding, etc.

Medicaid provides medically necessary services related to physical health, mental health, substance abuse treatment, and developmental disabilities. In North Carolina, Medicaid costs are split between the State (34.87%) and the Federal government (65.13%). "Ranking ninth among states in total Medicaid spending, North Carolina's Medicaid program has worked hard not just to cut spending to keep the program solvent, but also to contain costs while improving the quality of health care." In 2009, North Carolina had 1,274,193 adults and children in need of mental health, developmental disability, and substance abuse services.

The Social Security Act has been amended many times since its adoption to assist states in managing their Medicaid programs to best meet the needs of the state's eligible residents. One way the Social Security Act does this is by authorizing "multiple waiver and demonstration authorities to allow states flexibility in operating Medicaid programs." Each state's Medicaid Agency must submit for review and approval an application for a Home and Community Based Services (HCBS) waiver, and the State Medicaid Agency has the ultimate responsibility for an HCBS waiver program although it may delegate the day-to-day operation of the program to another entity.

== 1915(b)(c) Waiver Program ==
Seal of North Carolina

In response to its increasingly difficult budget situation, North Carolina is currently undertaking a statewide policy shift in how it budgets and manages funding for Medicaid programs specific to mental health, developmental disabilities, and substance abuse disorders.

North Carolina was originally approved to use both the Section 1915 (b) Managed Care/Freedom of Choice Waiver and the Section 1915 (c) Home and Community-based Services Waiver options in October 2004. The 1915 (b)(c) Waiver Program empowers the state designated public authority "to build partnerships with consumers, providers and community stakeholders to create a more responsive system of community care." The vision of this policy is "Responsible Change to Achieve Easy Access, Better Quality and Personal Outcomes."

The appeal of the 1915 (b)(c) Waiver Program is that annual Medicaid expenditures can be more accurately budgeted and managed based on a formula. Under the Waiver, the State would determine a per member per month amount (known as capitation) to be paid to the public authority designated by the NC Department of Health and Human Services (DHHS) Division of Medical Assistance (DMA), the State's Medicaid Agency. The capitation would be based on a formula that takes into account the historical service costs associated with the different Medicaid eligible groups.

In addition to the development of the capitation rate, the 1915 (b)(c) Waiver Program grants rate setting authority to adjust service rates to meet local needs, claims payment to ensure funds are spent in line with service authorizations, a closed network to allow for competition and choice within a stable network, utilization management to provide the right service at the right level, and care management to provide direct support to high cost/high risk customers.

=== Policy formulation ===
The state of North Carolina formulated the 1915 (b)(c) Waiver Program policy utilizing the input of numerous internal and external stakeholders. The original plan was drafted by the staff of the North Carolina Department of Health & Human Services. An External Advisory Team from within the Division of Mental Health, Developmental Disabilities, and Substance Abuse Services (MHDDSAS) provided review and feedback. Additional feedback was sought through the North Carolina Council of Community Programs. The NC Council of Community Programs was incorporated in 1983 and is dedicated to helping area authorities in North Carolina improve their service quality and management effectiveness. The draft plan was then posted on the state's website (www.nc.gov) and distributed via a state Communication Bulletin and an invitation was issued for all stakeholders to provide ideas, suggestions, questions, and feedback.

A complaint has been noted by the North Carolina Council on Developmental Disabilities that individuals and families feel that they were not consulted prior to their local LMEs submitting applications to be designated as an expansion site. Staff from the NC Division of MHDDSAS responded to this concern by noting that LMEs had little opportunity for this type of stakeholder engagement given the initial time frame for the waiver amendment and the Request for Applications process initiated by NC DHHS. It was additionally noted that input would be sought after selection and during the implementation process. NC DHHS staff noted for the record that DHHS was "actively engaging" the State Consumer & Family Advisory Committee as an active partner for input as they move forward.

=== Goals of the 1915 (b)(c) Waiver Program ===
The NC Department of Health and Human Services has six goals for the 1915 (b)(c) Waiver Program. They are:

1. improve access to mental health, developmental disability, and substance abuse (MHDDSA) services,
2. improve quality of MHDDSA services,
3. improve outcomes for people receiving MHDDSA services,
4. improve access to primary care for people with mental illness, developmental disabilities and substance abuse,
5. improve cost benefit of services,
6. effectively manage all public resources assigned to LMEs (local management entities).

=== Implementation plan ===
The NC DHHS implementation plan for the 1915 (b)(c) Waiver Program included the following key dates per S.L. 2011-264:

1. August 1, 2011: additional LME sites announced,
2. October 1, 2011: Strategic Plan to be presented to the General Assembly,
3. January 1, 2013: Assignment of any unassigned counties to an LME,
4. July 1, 2013: completion of expansion.

Recognizing the diverse capacity for implementation across the 23 LMEs of the state, North Carolina established the following minimum requirements to participate in the Waiver Program:

1. the LME must represent a Medicaid eligible population (3 years and older) of 70,000 plus,
2. be fully divested of providing all State funded or Medicaid reimbursable services,
3. be fully accredited for a minimum of 3 years,
4. have sufficient financial resources and strong financial management,
5. submit a letter of support from full LME Board of Directors accepting financial responsibility for the program,
6. provide proof that the LME does not serve as legal guardian for a recipient of Medicaid funded MHDDSA services,
7. provide proof of no staff or Board conflicts of interest,
8. demonstrate a strong Information Technology capacity,
9. provide a letter of support from the LME Consumer and Family Advisory Committee (CFAC),
10. demonstrate strong clinical operations,
11. demonstrate strong administrative operations, and
12. provide a comprehensive implementation plan for the 1915 (b)(c) Waiver Program.

The state enlisted the assistance of a consultant group, Mercer Government Human Services Consulting, to assist in creating and evaluating an LME's ability to meet the minimum standards. If an LME cannot meet the minimum standards established, they will be required to merge with another LME. The process began with 23 LMEs across the state, it is anticipated that by the end of the implementation process there will only be 8–10 LMEs left.

=== Evaluation ===
The State's Strategic Plan for the 1915 (b)(c) Waiver Program provides for performance evaluation. Status reports are required to be submitted to the Legislative Oversight Committee and then be published for all stakeholders. The current schedule for official status reports to be submitted to the General Assembly includes the remaining dates: 10/1/12, 2/1/13, and 10/1/13. Reports will address the Strategic Plan's six objectives and 23 action steps. The six objectives are:

1. oversee MHDDSA service system change,
2. partner with LME/MCOs [Managed Care Organizations] to ensure successful implementation,
3. ensure access and quality of the service system for individuals with mental illness, developmental disabilities or substance abuse,
4. strengthen the partnership with stakeholders in advising the State on implementation of the strategic plan,
5. increase knowledge and skills throughout the system, and
6. partner with LME/MCOs and CCNC [Community Care North Carolina] to promote and implement a system of integrated care between mental health, intellectual/developmental disability and substance abuse service providers and primary care providers.

Additional quantitative and qualitative evaluation processes are being undertaken. The Federal government, through the Centers for Medicaid and Medicare Services, requires both an External Quality Review and a Global Continuous Quality Improvement Team. The State is also forming Intra-departmental Monitoring Teams, an Executive Management Team, and MHDDSA Quality Improvement Steering Committee.

On the local level, LMEs are required by their contract with DMA to "submit data and measurements to DMA annually for quality of care and service measures and performance improvement projects for 27 measures in 7 broad areas." The reporting areas are:

1. Effectiveness of Care,
2. Access/ Availability,
3. Patient and Provider Satisfaction,
4. Use of Services,
5. Health Plan Stability,
6. Plan Descriptive Information, and
7. Health & Safety.

NC DHHS reports that based on the pilot 1915 (b)(c) Waiver Program results to date, "North Carolina has demonstrated that the State can provide quality mental health, developmental disabilities, and substance abuse services through private and public sector cooperation and at a lesser or comparable cost than fee-for-service program costs for Medicaid eligible population." Specifically, in its December 2011 report, NC DHHS shared that "there is a substantial difference in the average expenditure for care beginning in 2008, with expenditures remaining relatively stable at PBH [Piedmont Behavioral Health, the pilot site for the waiver program], while expenditures soared across the rest of the state."

Response to the policy change has not been all positive, though. Vicki Smith, Executive Director of Disability Rights NC, stated that there is a "great deal of pressure on DHHS to quickly convert LMEs to Medicaid Waivers so the General Assembly's cost cutting targets can be met."

David Cornwell, Executive Director of NC Mental Hope, stated that "between changes OK'd by House Bill 916 and proposed changes in Chapter 122C, it's not just a wrecking ball that will be slamming into our state's system, it's an army of bulldozers and backhoes and mammoth dump trucks lining up to roll over it. And the same legislators that can't see further than next year's budget also don't care if there's a blueprint for the final product, only that there is a sketch of what the next phase will look like."

In 2009 NAMI, National Alliance on Mental Illness, gave the state of North Carolina a D for its mental health system stating that a grade of D "does not even begin to convey the chaos that now pervades the state's mental health care system...NAMI warned three years ago [2006] that the state's reform initiatives were changing too much, too fast, resulting in an increasingly disorganized environment. This prediction was accurate."

=== Pilot Site ===
Piedmont Behavioral Health, known as PBH, was chosen as the pilot site for the 1915 (b)(c) Waiver Program in 2005. PBH serves Cabarrus, Davidson, Rowan, Stanly, and Union counties.

=== Expansion Sites ===
Mecklenburg County Area Mental Health and Western Highlands Network (the LME serving Buncombe, Henderson, Madison, Mitchell, Polk, Rutherford, Transylvania and Yancey counties) were chosen as the two expansion sites for the 1915 (b)(c) Waiver Program in late 2010.

Mecklenburg County Area Mental Health was scheduled to come online with the 1915 (b)(c) Waiver in 2011 but had trouble with policy implementation and "paused" their Waiver program in September 2010. In June 2011, the State asked Mecklenburg to reenter the waiver program expansion. Mecklenburg County Area Mental Health is now on track to fully implement the policy in January 2013 in the state's third phase of expansion. In its place, East Carolina Behavioral Health (ECBH) came on line on April 1, 2012. ECBH serves Beaufort, Bertie, Camden, Chowan, Craven, Currituck, Dare, Gates, Hertford, Hyde, Jones, Martin, Northampton, Pamlico, Pasquotank, Perquimans, Pitt, Tyrrell, and Washington counties.

Western Highlands Network (WHN) went into effect on January 3, 2012. The 14 months between the date that WHN was announced as an expansion site and the date the waiver went into effect were a flurry of activity. WHN developed both a Care Management/Utilization Management Department to review and authorize requests for services and a Care Coordination Department to provide the administrative function of treatment planning for a select high needs/high risk population. They have additionally formed a Child Transition Team to assist with planning for children in residential treatment settings and a Care Review Team that "is a resource for Child and Family Teams (CFTM) of high risk youth with serious mental health issues, substance abuse or developmental disabilities and is primarily used to assist CFTM" in resource identification and planning.

In July 2012, Smoky Mountain Center and Sandhills Center LMEs are scheduled to come online as Phase II. Phase III will be implemented by January 2013 and will include: Mecklenburg Area Mental Health, CenterPoint Human Services, Durham Center, EastPointe, Pathways, and CoastalCare LMEs. Any unassigned LMEs will be assigned at that point in time.

In 2020, North Carolina transitioned to a Medicaid Managed Care model, requiring Medicaid recipients with a mental illness, substance use disorder, intellectual and developmental disability, or a traumatic brain injury requires specialized services and support to enroll in a NC Medicaid Direct plan, available only through LMEs and MCOs.
