= Cedar Rapids Pump Company Factory and Warehouse =

- U.S. National Register of Historic Places
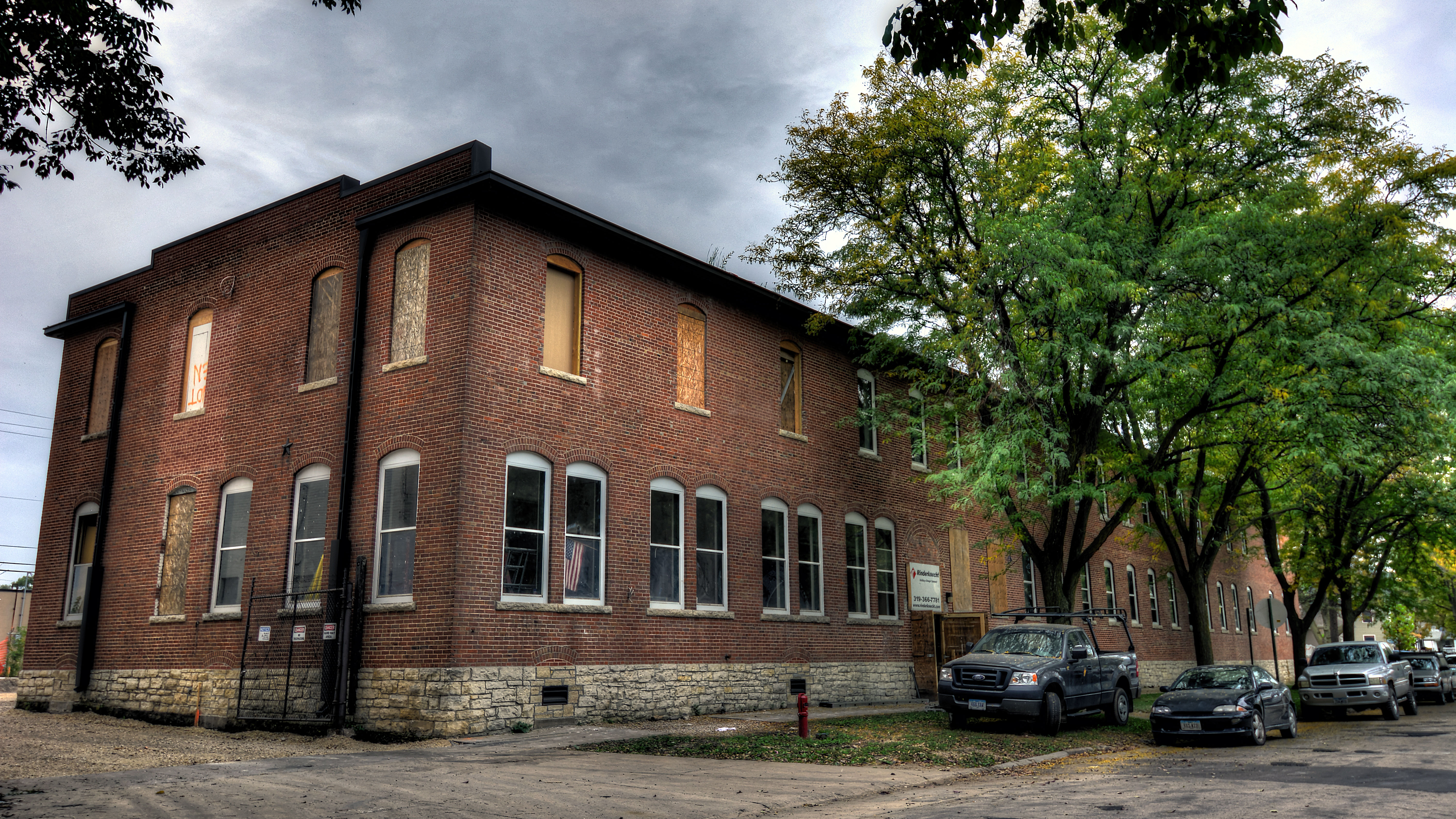
- The warehouse building (1901)

- Location within Iowa Location within the United States
- Location: 605 G Avenue NW; Cedar Rapids, Iowa
- Coordinates: 41°58′47.6″N 91°40′51.5″W
- Area: 1.22 acres (0.49 ha)
- Built: 1884, 1901
- Architectural style: Late Victorian
- MPS: Cedar Rapids, Iowa MPS
- NRHP reference No.: 12000907
- Added to NRHP: November 6, 2012

The Cedar Rapids Pump Company Factory and Warehouse are two historic buildings located in Cedar Rapids, Iowa, United States. The company began in 1881. They manufactured and distributed water pumps and windmills throughout the Midwest from this facility from 1884 to 1929. They completed the first floor of the factory building along the Chicago and North Western Railroad tracks in 1884. The second floor was added to the building around 1894, and in 1901 the warehouse building was completed. The Cedar Rapids Community School District used both buildings for storage from 1974 to about 2008. The buildings were affected by the 2008 flood. The two-story brick factory building features a monitor roof, and is otherwise "purely utilitarian in appearance with no particular stylistic or decorative tendency." The warehouse is also two-stories, constructed in brick, and lacking in ornamentation. The buildings were listed together on the National Register of Historic Places in 2012.
