= Connor Colby =

American football player (born 2003)

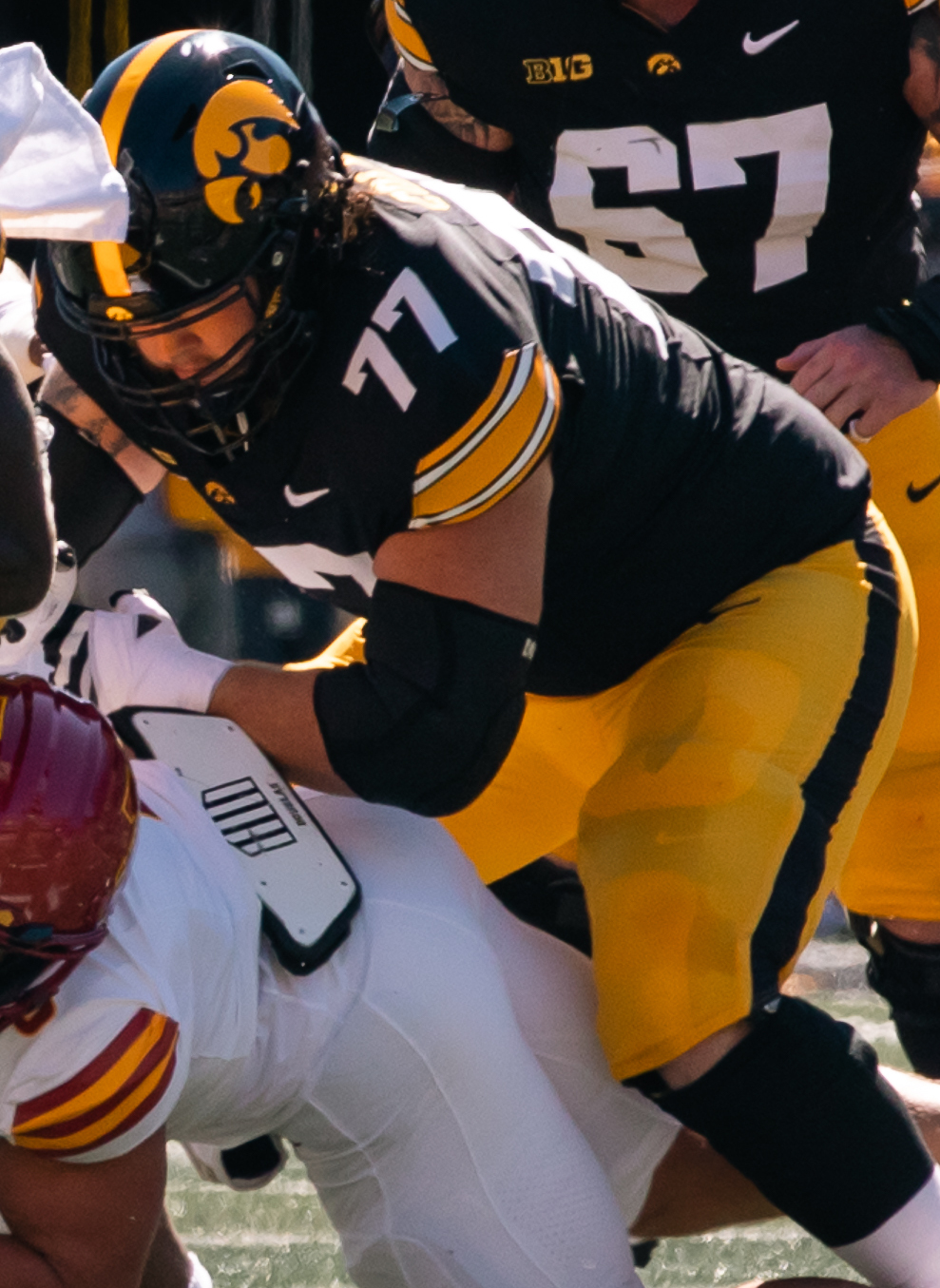
- Colby with Iowa in 2024

No. 75 – San Francisco 49ers
- Position: Guard
- Roster status: Active

Personal information
- Born: January 16, 2003 (age 23); Cedar Rapids, Iowa, U.S.
- Listed height: 6 ft 5 in (1.96 m)
- Listed weight: 309 lb (140 kg)

Career information
- High school: John F. Kennedy (Cedar Rapids, Iowa)
- College: Iowa (2021–2024)
- NFL draft: 2025: 7th round, 249th overall pick

Career history
- San Francisco 49ers (2025–present)

Awards and highlights
- First-team All-Big Ten (2024); Third-team All-Big Ten (2023)

Career NFL statistics as of Week 1, 2026
- Games played: 14
- Games started: 7
- Stats at Pro Football Reference

Connor Colby (born January 16, 2003) is an American professional football guard for the San Francisco 49ers of the National Football League (NFL). He played college football for the Iowa Hawkeyes and was selected by the 49ers in the seventh round of the 2025 NFL draft.

== Early life ==
Colby was born on January 16, 2003 in Cedar Rapids, Iowa. Colby attended John F. Kennedy High School in Cedar Rapids, where he was a three-time letterwinner in football. He rated as a four-star recruit and held offers from schools such as Iowa, Michigan, Nebraska, Ohio State, and Notre Dame. Ultimately, Colby committed to play college football for the Iowa Hawkeyes.

== College career ==
As a freshman, Colby earned a spot in the starting lineup in the fourth game of the season. From 2021 to 2024, he appeared in 54 games, making 50 starts at left guard, right guard, and right tackle. Colby was also named third team all-Big Ten in 2023, and first team all-Big Ten in 2024.

== Professional career ==
Pre-draft measurables
| Height | Weight | Arm length | Hand span | Wingspan | 40-yard dash | 10-yard split | 20-yard split | 20-yard shuttle | Three-cone drill | Vertical jump | Broad jump | Bench press |
|---|---|---|---|---|---|---|---|---|---|---|---|---|
| 6 ft 5 3/4 in (1.97 m) | 309 lb (140 kg) | 32 in (0.81 m) | 10 in (0.25 m) | 6 ft 5 1/8 in (1.96 m) | 5.11 s | 1.78 s | 2.94 s | 4.58 s | 7.53 s | 29.5 in (0.75 m) | 9 ft 3 in (2.82 m) | 23 reps |
All values from NFL Combine/Pro Day

Colby was selected by the San Francisco 49ers with the 249th pick in the seventh round of the 2025 NFL draft. He started six games as a rookie during the 2025 season, before being moved to the bench. Colby was named starting left guard entering the 2026 regular season.

== NFL career statistics ==
=== Regular season ===
| Year | Team | Games | | Receiving | | | | | Rushing | | | | | Fumbles | |
| Year | Team | GP | GS | Rec | Yds | Avg | Lng | TD | Att | Yds | Avg | Lng | TD | Fum | Lost |
|---|---|---|---|---|---|---|---|---|---|---|---|---|---|---|---|
| 2025 | SF | 13 | 6 | 1 | -1 | -1.0 | -1 | 0 | 0 | 0 | 0.0 | 0 | 0 | 0 | 0 |
| 2026 | SF | 1 | 1 | 0 | 0 | 0.0 | 0 | 0 | 0 | 0 | 0.0 | 0 | 0 | 0 | 0 |
| Career | | 14 | 7 | 1 | -1 | -1.0 | -1 | 0 | 0 | 0 | 0.0 | 0 | 0 | 0 | 0 |

=== Postseason ===
| Year | Team | Games | | Receiving | | | | | Rushing | | | | | Fumbles | |
| Year | Team | GP | GS | Rec | Yds | Avg | Lng | TD | Att | Yds | Avg | Lng | TD | Fum | Lost |
|---|---|---|---|---|---|---|---|---|---|---|---|---|---|---|---|
| 2025 | SF | 2 | 0 | 0 | 0 | 0.0 | 0 | 0 | 0 | 0 | 0.0 | 0 | 0 | 0 | 0 |
| Career | | 2 | 0 | 0 | 0 | 0.0 | 0 | 0 | 0 | 0 | 0.0 | 0 | 0 | 0 | 0 |
