= Julie Beckett =

American disability rights activist (1949–2022)

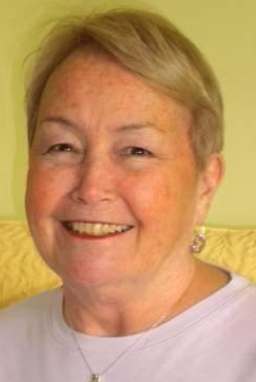
- Born: Julianne Ethel O'Connell; 9 November 1949; Cedar Rapids, Iowa, U.S.
- Died: 13 May 2022 (aged 72); Cedar Rapids, Iowa, U.S.
- Occupations: Educator, activist
- Spouse: Mark Beckett (m. 1978; div. 1990)
- Children: Katie Beckett

Julianne Ethel Beckett (née O'Connell; November 9, 1949 – May 13, 2022) was an American teacher and disability rights activist. She lobbied for changes to Medicaid that allowed hundreds of thousands of disabled children to be cared for by their families at home. Her efforts, and those of other activists, led to the legislation and establishment of the Katie Beckett Medicaid waiver, named for her daughter Mary Katherine Beckett (1978–2012), who used a ventilator after surviving viral encephalitis in infancy. The waiver was included as a provision of the Tax Equity and Fiscal Responsibility Act of 1982.

== Early life and education ==
Julianne O'Connell was born in Cedar Rapids, Iowa, one of the eight children born to John Joseph O'Connell and Barbara Jane Ryan O'Connell. Her family was Roman Catholic; her father was a World War II veteran and a lumber salesman. She graduated from Regis High School in 1967, and from Clarke College in Dubuque in 1971; she earned a master's degree in history from the University of Dayton.

== Career ==
Julie and Mark Beckett with their daughter Katie, meeting Ronald Reagan outside Air Force One at the Cedar Rapids airport in 1984

Julie Beckett was a part-time teacher and worked in a record store, before becoming her only child's full-time caregiver. She was also state director of Sick Kids Need Involved People (SKIP), and later co-founder and policy coordinator for Family Voices, a national lobbying organization. She testified before Congressional hearings several times. She remained active in Medicaid reform work after the Katie Beckett waiver was established; "my goal is that no child will ever have to go through what my child had to go through," she told a newspaper in 1995. She was honored as a child advocate in 2000, and as a local hero at the Cedar Rapids Freedom Festival in 2005.

== Personal life ==
Julie O'Connell and Mark Beckett married in 1978; they divorced in 1990. Their daughter Katie was born prematurely in 1978, and died in 2012. Beckett died from a heart attack in May 2022, at the age of 72. "Thanks to Julie's tireless advocacy, millions of Americans, including hundreds of thousands of children with complex medical needs, have been able to receive the care and support they need in their homes rather than in institutional settings", said Daniel Tsai of the Centers for Medicare & Medicaid Services, a federal agency.
