= Connor Van Scoyoc =

American baseball player (born 1999)

Free agent
- Pitcher
- Born: November 26, 1999 (age 26); Cedar Rapids, Iowa, U.S.
- Bats: Right Throws: Right
- Stats at Baseball Reference

Connor John Van Scoyoc (born November 26, 1999) is an American professional baseball pitcher who is a free agent. He was originally drafted by the Los Angeles Angels in the 11th round of the 2018 Major League Baseball draft.

== Career ==
Van Scoyoc attended Jefferson High School in Cedar Rapids, Iowa.

=== Los Angeles Angels ===
The Los Angeles Angels drafted Van Scoyoc in the 11th round, with the 331st overall selection, of the 2018 MLB draft. He signed with the Angels for a $397,500 signing bonus, rather than follow through with his commitment to play college baseball for Arizona State University. He made his professional debut in 2019 with the rookie-level Arizona League Angels, logging a 2-2 record and 5.13 earned run average with 50 strikeouts across 12 games (5 starts). Van Scoyoc later underwent Tommy John surgery, ending his season. He did not play in a game in 2020 due to the cancellation of the minor league season because of the COVID-19 pandemic.

Van Scoyoc returned to action in 2021 with the rookie-level Arizona Complex League Angels and Single-A Inland Empire 66ers, accumulating a combined 0-3 record and 6.48 earned run average with 51 strikeouts across 42 1/3 innings pitched. He spent the 2022 season back with Inland Empire, compiling an 11-5 record and 4.28 earned run average with 140 strikeouts in 120 innings pitched across 23 games (22 starts). Van Scoyoc began the 2023 with the High-A Tri-City Dust Devils, making 11 starts and posting a 4-3 record and 2.76 earned run average with 56 strikeouts.

=== Colorado Rockies ===
On June 24, 2023, the Angels traded Van Scoyoc to the Colorado Rockies in exchange for Mike Moustakas. Down the stretch, he made 12 starts split between the High-A Spokane Indians and Double-A Hartford Yard Goats.

Van Scoyoc returned to Hartford in 2024, making 23 appearances (22 starts) and registering a 7-7 record and 4.46 earned run average with 73 strikeouts across 115 innings wings pitched. He elected free agency following the season on November 4, 2024.

On November 6, 2024, Van Scoyoc re-signed with the Rockies organization on a minor league contract. He made 41 relief appearances for the Triple-A Albuquerque Isotopes in 2025, logging an 8-6 record and 4.19 ERA with 46 strikeouts over 86 innings of work. Van Scoyoc elected free agency following the season on November 6, 2025.

=== Washington Nationals ===
The Washington Nationals signed Van Scoyoc to a minor league contract on January 20, 2026. He made 30 appearances (including five starts) split between the Double–A Harrisburg Senators and Triple–A Rochester Red Wings, posting a cumulative 7–4 record and 4.84 ERA with 69 strikeouts across 74 1/3 innings pitched. Van Scoyoc was released by the Nationals organization on September 9.

== Personal life ==
Van Scoyoc's grandfather, Jim, won 700 games as the baseball coach for Norway High School. His father, Aaron, and older brother, Spencer, have played in Minor League Baseball. Spencer is currently in the Philadelphia Phillies organization. His great uncle, Mike Boddicker, played in Major League Baseball (MLB).
