= Palo, Iowa =

- City
- Location of Palo, Iowa
- Coordinates: 42°03′51″N 91°47′57″W
- Country: United States
- State: Iowa
- County: Linn

Area
  - Total: 1.10 sq mi (2.86 km^{2})
  - Land: 1.10 sq mi (2.86 km^{2})
  - Water: 0 sq mi (0.00 km^{2})
- Elevation: 742 ft (226 m)

Population (2020 population_footnotes =)
  - Total: 1,407
  - Density: 1,275.0/sq mi (492.28/km^{2})
- Time zone: UTC-6 (Central (CST))
  - Summer (DST): UTC-5 (CDT)
- ZIP code: 52324
- Area code: 319
- FIPS code: 19-61230
- GNIS feature ID: 2396132
- Website: cityofpalo.com

Palo is a city in Linn County, Iowa, United States. The population was 1,407 at the time of the 2020 census. It is part of the Cedar Rapids Metropolitan Statistical Area.

Palo is located near Pleasant Creek State Recreation Park.

== History ==
In 1849 a regional post office was named by Marion resident Dr. Bardwell, shortly after the Battle of Palo Alto in the Mexican-American War. Dr. Bardwell, used the short name Palo. The town was surveyed in 1854 and the first building in Palo was built in the same year and the town took its name from the local post office.

=== Floods of 2008 ===
Palo suffered severe damage during the 2008 flood. Approximately 980 residents, the entirety of the town, were ordered to abandon their homes and businesses. The mandatory evacuation was ordered by the Linn County Emergency Management department, due to flooding from the Cedar River.

== Geography ==
According to the United States Census Bureau, the city has a total area of 1.43 square miles (3.70 km^{2}), all land.

== Demographics ==
Historical populations
Year	Pop.	±%
1880	135	—
1890	159	+17.8%
1900	184	+15.7%
1910	208	+13.0%
1920	224	+7.7%
1930	205	−8.5%
1940	250	+22.0%
1950	285	+14.0%
1960	387	+35.8%
1970	430	+11.1%
1980	529	+23.0%
1990	514	−2.8%
2000	614	+19.5%
2010	1,026	+67.1%
2020	1,407	+37.1%
Source:"U.S. Census website". United States Census Bureau. and Iowa Data Center; Source: U.S. Decennial Census

=== 2020 census ===
As of the 2020 census, Palo had a population of 1,407 people, with 482 households and 380 families residing in the city. The population density was 1,275.0 inhabitants per square mile (492.3/km^{2}), and 0.0% of residents lived in urban areas while 100.0% lived in rural areas.

The median age was 34.3 years. 31.1% of residents were under the age of 18 and 7.9% were 65 years of age or older. 33.4% of residents were under the age of 20; 3.2% were between the ages of 20 and 24; 34.1% were from 25 to 44; and 21.4% were from 45 to 64. The gender makeup of the city was 52.6% male and 47.4% female. For every 100 females there were 110.9 males, and for every 100 females age 18 and over there were 108.8 males age 18 and over.

Of the 482 households, 47.9% had children under the age of 18 living with them. Of all households, 64.1% were married-couple households, 11.2% were cohabitating couples, 14.3% were households with a male householder and no spouse or partner present, and 10.4% were households with a female householder and no spouse or partner present. 21.2% of households were non-families; 13.9% were made up of individuals; and 5.0% had someone living alone who was 65 years of age or older.

There were 499 housing units at an average density of 452.2 per square mile (174.6/km^{2}), of which 3.4% were vacant. The homeowner vacancy rate was 2.0% and the rental vacancy rate was 2.7%.

Racial composition as of the 2020 census
Race	Number	Percent
White	1,322	94.0%
Black or African American	15	1.1%
American Indian and Alaska Native	0	0.0%
Asian	8	0.6%
Native Hawaiian and Other Pacific Islander	0	0.0%
Some other race	8	0.6%
Two or more races	54	3.8%
Hispanic or Latino (of any race)	29	2.1%

=== 2010 census ===
As of the census of 2010, there were 1,026 people, 358 households, and 292 families living in the city. The population density was 717.5 inhabitants per square mile (277.0/km^{2}). There were 372 housing units at an average density of 260.1 per square mile (100.4/km^{2}). The racial makeup of the city was 97.6% White, 0.5% African American, 0.1% Native American, 0.3% Asian, and 1.6% from two or more races. Hispanic or Latino of any race were 1.4% of the population.

There were 358 households, of which 48.6% had children under the age of 18 living with them, 69.6% were married couples living together, 6.4% had a female householder with no husband present, 5.6% had a male householder with no wife present, and 18.4% were non-families. 13.7% of all households were made up of individuals, and 4.2% had someone living alone who was 65 years of age or older. The average household size was 2.87 and the average family size was 3.13.

The median age in the city was 32.4 years. 32.3% of residents were under the age of 18; 4.7% were between the ages of 18 and 24; 34% were from 25 to 44; 22.1% were from 45 to 64; and 6.8% were 65 years of age or older. The gender makeup of the city was 51.6% male and 48.4% female.

=== 2000 census ===
As of the census of 2000, there were 614 people, 247 households, and 170 families living in the city. The population density was 490.4 inhabitants per square mile (189.3/km^{2}). There were 251 housing units at an average density of 200.5 per square mile (77.4/km^{2}). The racial makeup of the city was 98.70% White, 0.16% African American, 0.16% Asian, 0.16% from other races, and 0.81% from two or more races. Hispanic or Latino of any race were 0.65% of the population.

There were 247 households, out of which 28.3% had children under the age of 18 living with them, 61.5% were married couples living together, 4.0% had a female householder with no husband present, and 30.8% were non-families. 23.1% of all households were made up of individuals, and 8.9% had someone living alone who was 65 years of age or older. The average household size was 2.49 and the average family size was 2.94.

In the city, the population was spread out, with 25.1% under the age of 18, 5.7% from 18 to 24, 31.6% from 25 to 44, 28.3% from 45 to 64, and 9.3% who were 65 years of age or older. The median age was 38 years. For every 100 females, there were 96.2 males. For every 100 females age 18 and over, there were 99.1 males.

The median income for a household in the city was $53,558, and the median income for a family was $58,571. Males had a median income of $39,167 versus $24,044 for females. The per capita income for the city was $21,429. About 1.1% of families and 4.6% of the population were below the poverty line, including none of those under age 18 and 18.6% of those age 65 or over.

== Education ==
Palo is in the Cedar Rapids Community School District.

Zoned schools for Palo:

- Elementary schools: Viola Gibson
- Secondary schools: Harding Middle School and Kennedy High School
