= Garret Frey =

American disability rights activist (born 1982)

- Born: 1982 (age 43–44); Cedar Rapids, Iowa, U.S.
- Occupation: Disability rights activist
- Years active: 1999–present
- Known for: Cedar Rapids Community School District v. Garret F.

Garret Frey (born c. 1982) is an American disability rights activist. Paralysed from the age of four, he first rose to prominence through the 1999 Supreme Court case Cedar Rapids Community School District v. Garret F., which ruled that schools were required to provide continuous nursing care for disabled students under the related services provision of the Individuals with Disabilities Education Act. Since then, Frey has campaigned for the right of people with disabilities to participate fully in society.

== Biography ==
=== Early life and education ===
Frey was born and raised in Cedar Rapids, Iowa. In 1987, at the age of four, Frey was severely injured in an accident when his blanket got caught in his father's motorcycle motor mechanism, jerking back his head and severing his spinal cord. Frey became permanently paralysed with a C4-C5 spinal injury. Growing up, Frey and his family were friends with Katie Beckett, a fellow ventilator-using child from Cedar Rapids who had drawn national attention during the 1980s to the issue of people with disabilities forced to live away from their homes due to federal laws preventing their families from receiving funding to enable them to be cared for in their homes.

=== Cedar Rapids Community School District v. Garret F. ===
In 1988, Frey started his education within the Cedar Rapids Community School District. His care needs, which included tracheotomy suctioning, repositioning in his wheelchair, assistance with feeding and drinking, ventilator checks, respiratory assessments, periodic catherisation and ambu bag administration, were initially met by a combination of Frey's family members, including his aunt, and medical assistants, paid for by Frey's family. From 1993, Frey's family regularly requested that the school district pay for the medical support required to oversee Frey's ventilator to allow him to attend classes at Jefferson High School. The school district argued that it was not obliged to provide Frey with medical assistance, stating that this constituted a health care need. The Frey family took the case to state courts in Iowa, which acted in their favour; the school district subsequently lodged the case with the United States Court of Appeals for the Eighth Circuit, which also ruled in favour of the Frey family.

The United States Supreme Court heard arguments on 4 November 1998. The Clinton administration had publicly supported Frey, stating that continuous nursing services as requested by the family was a related service under the Individuals with Disabilities Education Act; Al Gore, the Vice President, went on to meet Frey in Cedar Rapids. On 3 March 1999, the Supreme Court ruled 7–2 in Frey's favour, describing him as a "friendly, creative and intelligent young man" who had a "right" to services that enabled him to attend school. Lewis Finch, the superintendent of the Cedar Rapids Community School District, stated that the ruling would have a "tremendous" impact on the district's finances, as well as other school districts who would need to provide care to some disabled students.

=== Adulthood ===
Frey cited Tom Harkin, the former United States Senator from Iowa who was the lead author of the Americans with Disabilities Act of 1990, as one of his heroes. He has campaigned for greater rights for people with disabilities, both within Iowa and nationally. Frey is a member of the Arc of Iowa, a disability rights group, which calls on the Government of Iowa to pass policies that enable people with disabilities to participate in society. As of 2025, Frey lives in Cedar Rapids with his mother and brother.

In 2024, Frey filed a complaint with federal officials over the Iowa Department of Health and Human Services' refusal to increase Medicaid payments, which Frey stated prevented him from paying caregivers to look after him at his home overnight; he described Medicaid as being an "entitlement" and not a "handout". Frey stated that without the support, he would need to move into a care home against his wishes. In June 2024, the Office for Civil Rights at the United States Health and Human Services announced that it had come to an agreement with its Iowa counterpart over increasing Frey's Medicaid payments, allowing him to hire overnight care and to remain living at home.
