= Cedar Rapids Community School District =

School district in Cedar Rapids, Iowa, United States

Coordinates: 41.968597°N 91.690694°W

Location
- 2500 Edgewood Road NW, Cedar Rapids, Iowa Linn County United States

District information
- Type: Public
- Motto: Every Learner, Future Ready
- Grades: Pre-K through 12
- Superintendent: Dr. Tawana Grover
- Schools: 32
- Budget: $275,140,000 (2020-21)
- NCES District ID: 1906540

Students and staff
- Students: 15,564 (2022-23)
- Teachers: 1045.22 FTE
- Staff: 1355.84 FTE
- Student–teacher ratio: 14.89
- Athletic conference: Mississippi Valley Conference

Other information
- Website: crschools.us

The Cedar Rapids Community School District (CRCSD) is a public school district located in Cedar Rapids, Iowa. It has the second largest enrollment in the state of Iowa. The district has 21 elementary schools, 6 middle schools, 4 high schools, and 1 alternative high school.

The district is in Linn County. In addition to most of Cedar Rapids it serves Hiawatha, most of Robins, and Palo.

== Schools ==
The district has 32 total schools, most of which are named after United States presidents.

=== Elementary schools ===
CRCSD has 21 elementary schools. Elementary schools run from 8:50 AM to 3:50 PM, and dismiss at 2:20 PM each Friday.

School name	Year of establishment
Cedar River Academy at Taylor	1973
Cleveland	1920
Erskine	1955
Grant	1961, 1990
Grant Wood	1951
Harrison @ Madison Elementary	1930
Hiawatha	1958
Hoover	1955
Johnson STEAM Academy	1911
Kenwood Leadership Academy	1950
Maple Grove	2022
Nixon	1970
Pierce	1965
Trailside	2024
Truman Early Learning Center	1961
Van Buren	1884
Viola Gibson	2002
West Willow	2023
Wright	1954

=== Middle schools ===
Middle schools run from 7:50 AM to 2:50 PM, and dismiss at 1:20 on early-dismissal days.

School name
Franklin Middle School
Harding Middle School
McKinley STEAM Academy
Roosevelt Creative Corridor Business Academy
Taft Middle School
Wilson Middle School

=== High schools ===
High schools run from 7:50 AM to 2:50 PM and dismiss at 1:20 PM on early-dismissal days.

School name
Jefferson
Kennedy
Metro
Washington

=== Alternative Education ===
- City View Community High School

== Enrollment ==
View source data.

== See also ==
- List of school districts in Iowa
- Cedar Rapids Community School District v. Garret F., a 1999 Supreme Court case around disabled student Garret Frey's right to receive medical care from the district.
