= Jacob Jaacks =

American basketball player (born 1977)

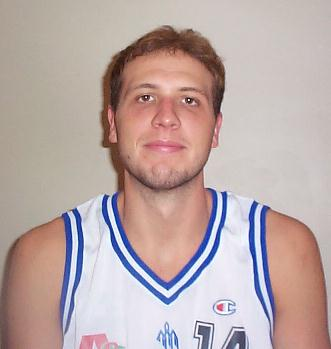

Personal information
- Born: April 24, 1977 (age 49) Rapid City, South Dakota, U.S.
- Listed height: 6 ft 10 in (2.08 m)
- Listed weight: 260 lb (118 kg)

Career information
- High school: Jefferson (Cedar Rapids, Iowa)
- College: South Dakota (1996–1997); Marshalltown CC (1997–1998); Iowa (1998–2000)
- NBA draft: 2000: undrafted
- Playing career: 2000–2011
- Position: Power forward / center

Career history
- 2000–2001: Limoges CSP
- 2001–2002: Saint-Quentin
- 2002–2003: Lauretana Biella
- 2003–2004: Edimes Pavia
- 2003–2004: Farho Gijón Baloncesto
- 2004–2005: Lauretana Biella
- 2005–2007: Snaidero Cucine Udine
- 2007–2008: Kyiv
- 2008–2009: Teramo Basket
- 2009–2010: Hapoel Afula
- 2010–2011: Telekom Baskets Bonn

Career highlights
- French League champion LNB (2001); Italian League All-Star (2006); Ukrainian SuproLeague champion (2008); NJCAA All-American (1998)

Jacob Brian Jaacks a.k.a. Jacob Crane (name changed because of divorce) (born April 24, 1977) is an American professional basketball player from Iowa, U.S. Jacob was a 6-foot-10-inch (2.08 m), 260-pound (120 kg) power forward/center.

Jacob attended Ankeny High School as a freshman and sophomore where he played basketball, but never on the varsity team. As a junior, his family moved to Cedar Rapids, Iowa, where he attended Cedar Rapids Jefferson High School. In his senior season he was named to the Mississippi Valley Conference team and helped lead the team to State (they lost to West Des Moines Valley in the quarterfinals).

Jacob accepted a scholarship to play at the University of South Dakota for coach Dave Boots. He was red-shirted his freshman year because of his lack of physical size and strength. His freshman campaign was successful in earning him a spot on the All-NCC freshman team. Soon afterwards, he decided to leave the University of South Dakota for Marshalltown Community College to pursue his dream of playing for a large, Division I university.

Jacob played for Mike Marquis at Marshalltown Community College where he was named a JUCO All-American. The team compiled a record of 29–5, and lost to the eventual Junior College national champions, Indian Hills Community College. Before the season started, Jacob was recruited by numerous major division I universities. When the University of Iowa extended a scholarship, Jacob accepted.

Under Coach Tom Davis at Iowa, Jacob played on a team of upperclassmen. The team had a successful season but lost in the Sweet 16 to the University of Connecticut (the eventual champion).

Jacob's senior year brought in the era of Steve Alford. With many seniors on the previous year's team now gone, Coach Alford had to quickly fill in players with a very short recruiting period. The result was a mediocre 14–16 record, with wins against Kansas, Ohio State & UConn. Jacob finished his career averaging 12.2 points and 7.3 rebounds for the University of Iowa Hawkeyes.

After his senior year, Jacob signed with the Toronto Raptors of the NBA. After the preseason, he was released by the team and immediately signed a contract to play in France for Limoges CSP basketball club. After winning a championship with Limoges and winning the French league rebounding title, Jacob returned to the U.S. and played for the San Antonio Spurs summer league team.

After several years of trying to make an NBA roster, Jacob decided to concentrate on only playing professionally in Europe. He retired in 2011, after 11 seasons professionally. Jacob played in Spain, Italy, France, Turkey, Israel, Ukraine and Germany.

Jacob currently resides in Iowa where he is happily working in the financial services industry with the 801 Group at Morgan Stanley.
