= Jefferson High School (Iowa) =

Public secondary school in Cedar Rapids, Iowa, United States

Coordinates: 41°57′54″N 91°41′53″W

Thomas Jefferson High School

Location
- 1243 20th St SW; Cedar Rapids, Iowa 52404; United States

Information
- Type: Public high school
- Established: 1958
- School district: Cedar Rapids Community School District
- Superintendent: Dr. Tawana Grover
- Principal: Sam Hostetler
- Teaching staff: 86.44 (on an FTE basis)
- Grades: 9–12
- Enrollment: 1,575 (2023–2024)
- Student to teacher ratio: 18.22
- Colors: Columbia Blue and White
- Mascot: Jeffy the J-Hawk
- Newspaper: The Outlook
- Affiliation: Mississippi Valley Conference
- Website: jefferson.crschools.us

Thomas Jefferson High School is a public high school in Cedar Rapids, Iowa. It is the eighth largest high school in Iowa. The school's mascot is Jeffy the J-Hawk and the official school colors are Columbia Blue and white.

== History ==
Thomas Jefferson's first class graduated in 1958, having first competed in athletic events starting in the fall of 1957. The school's original student body was made up of two formerly separate high schools, Theodore Roosevelt High School, and Woodrow Wilson High School. They merged into one school in April 1958, upon the completion of the construction of the school. Since then, Jefferson has been housed at its current location. The school added a new gymnasium addition to the school in 1990. In addition, a new science wing and music wing were built in 2003. The school has been named a "Blue Ribbon National School of Excellence" two times, one of the few traditional schools to earn this honor twice. In 2012, Jefferson received new geothermal heating.

== Statistics ==
Jefferson has 170 staff members and 1,516 students. The student to teacher ratio is 17:1.

== Academics ==
Jefferson offers four years of French, German, Japanese, and Spanish. All four languages also offer an AP replacement for 4th year.

== Extracurricular activities ==
=== Fine arts ===
Jefferson offers multiple instrumental programs, including "The Band of Blue" marching band, three concert bands, one jazz band, and two pep bands. They also offer six choirs and three show choirs. In addition, Jefferson has one orchestra ensemble.

=== Athletics ===
The J-Hawks compete in the Mississippi Valley Conference in the following sports:

- Cross Country
  - Girls' 1980 Class 3A State Champions
- Volleyball
- Football
  - 3 State Championships (1964*, 1965*, 1972) (* before creation of the State playoff system)
  - 4 District Championships (1972, 1974, 1976)
- Basketball
  - Boys' 1967 Class 2A State Champions
  - Girls' 1993 State Champions
- Wrestling
  - 3-time State Champions (1962, 1973, 1974)
- Swimming
- Track and Field
  - Boys' 1962 Class AA State Champions
- Golf
  - Boys' 1965 Class AA State Champions
- Soccer
- Softball
  - 3-time State Champions (1983, 1997, 1998)
- Baseball
  - 1961 State Champions
- Tennis
  - Girls' 1990 Class 2A State Champions
- Bowling

== Notable people ==
=== Alumni ===
- Landon Cassill, NASCAR driver
- Garret Frey, disability rights activist
- Jacob Jaacks, professional basketball player
- Larry Lawrence, former Oakland Raider, played in the Super Bowl
- Todd Taylor, Iowa State Senator, District 35
- Jarrod Uthoff, basketball player for the Iowa Hawkeyes, former Mr. Basketball in Iowa, forward for the Dallas Mavericks
- Connor Van Scoyoc, professional baseball player in Colorado Rockies organization
- Mark Walter, founder and the chief executive officer of Guggenheim Partners and Chairman of the Los Angeles Dodgers

=== Faculty ===
- Wally Horn, former teacher, former Iowa State Senator
- Bob Vander Plaats, former teacher and coach

== See also ==
- List of high schools in Iowa
