= John F. Kennedy High School (Iowa) =

Public secondary school in Cedar Rapids, Iowa, United States

Coordinates: 42°1′29″N 91°40′51″W

Cedar Rapids-Kennedy High School

Location
- 4545 Wenig Rd NE; Cedar Rapids, Iowa 52405; United States

Information
- Type: Public
- Established: 1967; 59 years ago
- School district: Cedar Rapids Community School District
- Principal: Jason Kline
- Teaching staff: 95.13 (on an FTE basis)
- Grades: 9–12
- Enrollment: 1,719 (2023-2024)
- Student to teacher ratio: 18.07
- Color
- Mascot: Cougars
- Affiliation: Mississippi Valley Conference
- Website: kennedy.crschools.us

Kennedy High School is a public high school located in Cedar Rapids, Iowa. Kennedy was founded in 1967. The building was dedicated by Senator Edward M. Kennedy, younger brother of the school's namesake President John F. Kennedy. The school's athletic teams are known as the Cougars. It is a part of the Cedar Rapids Community School District.

In addition to portions of Cedar Rapids, Kennedy High's boundary includes: Hiawatha, Palo, and most of Robins.

== Academics ==
Kennedy offers 32 Advanced Placement classes, including five world language courses AP Chinese, French, German, Japanese, and Spanish. In 2019 Kennedy placed sixth on the Iowa AP Index, a ranking system developed by the University of Iowa's Belin-Blank Center. The Iowa AP Index recognizes AP participation among public and private high schools in Iowa.

== Athletics ==
The Kennedy Cougars compete in the Mississippi Valley Conference in the following sports:

- Cross Country
- Volleyball
  - 1979 State Champions
- Football
- Basketball
  - Boys' 2-time State Champions (1972, 1984)
- Wrestling
- Swimming
  - Boys' 1981 State Champions
  - Girls' 2-time State Champions (1978, 1981)
- Track and Field
- Golf
  - Boys' 1991 State Champions
  - Coed 1974 State Champions
- Soccer
  - Girls' 3-time State Champions
- Softball
- Baseball
  - 2-time Class 4A State Champions (2010, 2024)

- Tennis
  - Boys' 2008 Class 2A State Champions
  - Girls' 1990 Class 2A State Champions
- Bowling
- Dance Team
  - 2 time State Champions (2001 lyrical, 2002 jazz)

The Cougars have won five consecutive Cedar Rapids Men's All-Sports Titles. The Cougars won the Girls State Soccer Championship in 2012 after upsetting top-ranked Ankeny in the finals.

== Performing Arts ==
Kennedy varsity show choir is named Happiness, Inc. The first show choir west of the Mississippi, Happiness was named "America's Favorite Show Choir" by Parade Magazine in 2011. Happiness placed first in FAME National Show Choir Championship in 2003 and at the 2012 Show Choir Nationals in Nashville, Tennessee. Kennedy's prep show choir is known as Protégé, and the all female show choir is known as Chanteurs, with each winning multiple awards for their divisions at several competitions over the years. Kennedy's band participated in the Chicago 2006 Heritage Festival.

== Notable alumni ==
- Connor Colby, college football offensive guard for the Iowa Hawkeyes
- Salvatore Giunta - United States Army, veteran of the War in Afghanistan, and the first living recipient of the Medal of Honor since the Vietnam War
- Shawn Sedlacek, former MLB player (Kansas City Royals)

== See also ==
- List of memorials to John F. Kennedy
- List of high schools in Iowa
