= Mike Moustakas =

American baseball player (born 1988)

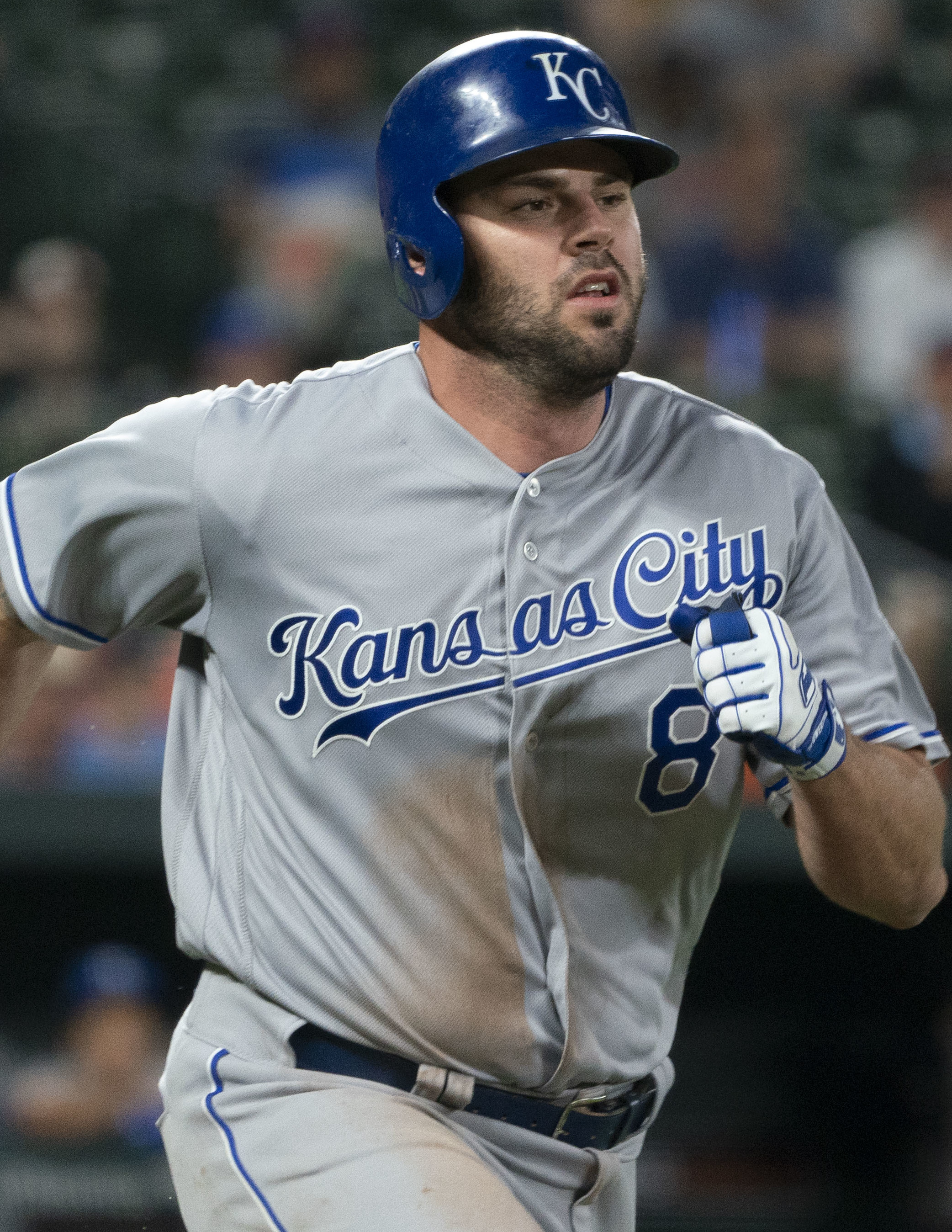
- Moustakas with the Kansas City Royals in 2018
- Third baseman
- Born: September 11, 1988 (age 38); Los Angeles, California, U.S.
- Batted: Left Threw: Right

MLB debut
- June 10, 2011, for the Kansas City Royals

Last MLB appearance
- September 30, 2023, for the Los Angeles Angels

MLB statistics
- Batting average: .247
- Home runs: 215
- Runs batted in: 683
- Stats at Baseball Reference

Teams
- Kansas City Royals (2011–2018); Milwaukee Brewers (2018–2019); Cincinnati Reds (2020–2022); Colorado Rockies (2023); Los Angeles Angels (2023)

Career highlights and awards
- 3× All-Star (2015, 2017, 2019); World Series champion (2015); AL Comeback Player of the Year (2017)
Medals
Men's baseball
Representing United States
World Junior Baseball Championship
Silver medal – second place	2006 Sancti Spíritus	Team

Michael Christopher Moustakas (/muːˈstɑːkəs/; born September 11, 1988) is an American former professional baseball third baseman. He played in Major League Baseball (MLB) for the Kansas City Royals, Milwaukee Brewers, Cincinnati Reds, Colorado Rockies, and Los Angeles Angels.

Moustakas was drafted in the first round (second overall) of the 2007 MLB draft by the Royals. During games he was often greeted by calls of "Moose", a nickname given by his little league coach along with fans and the media.

== Early life ==
Moustakas attended Chatsworth High School in Chatsworth, Los Angeles, California, where he was a four-year starter in baseball. During that time he helped Chatsworth to a 124–11 record, including four West Valley League championships, and two California Interscholastic Federation city titles. Moustakas was voted "Player of the Year" by Cal-Hi Sports in both his sophomore and junior years. His 52 career home runs in high school are a California prep state record.

Moustakas attempted to be a two-sport player for Chatsworth, but a broken ankle suffered in his first game as quarterback for the Chancellors ended his football career, and nearly ended his baseball career. However, after three months of rehabilitation, Moustakas was able to resume playing baseball. In 2006, Moustakas was a member of USA Baseball's Junior National Team, competing in the World Junior Championships in Cuba. He topped off his prep career by being named Baseball America's High School Player of the Year in 2007, an honor previously bestowed on MLB stars like Joe Mauer, Homer Bailey, and Josh Hamilton. Moustakas was also selected to the USA Today All-USA high school baseball team in 2007. He was offered a scholarship to USC, but turned it down to enter the 2007 MLB draft.

== Professional career ==
=== Minor leagues ===
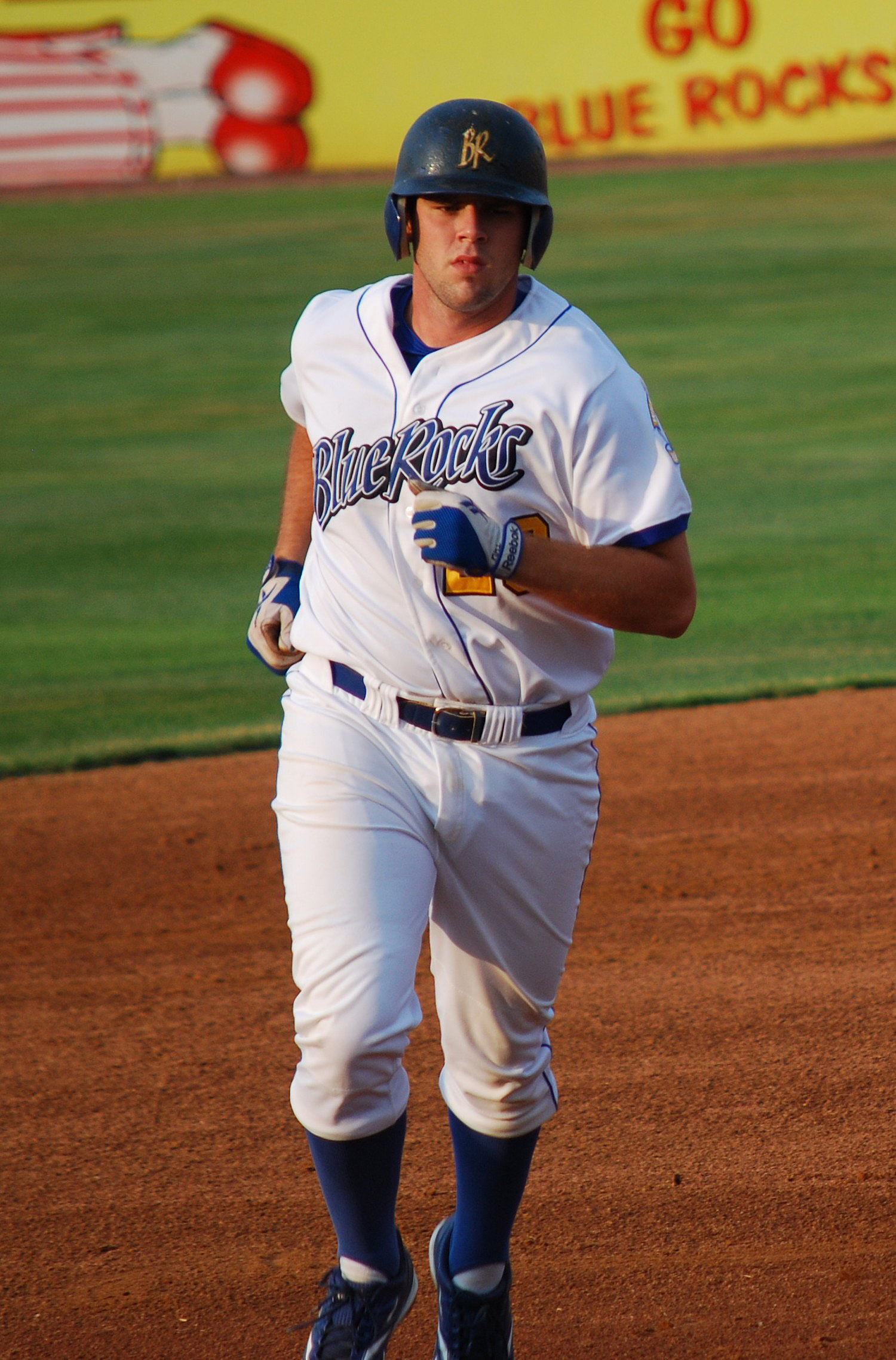
Moustakas with the Wilmington Blue Rocks in 2009

The Kansas City Royals selected Moustakas with the second overall pick of the 2007 amateur draft. He signed with the team on August 15, 2007, receiving a reported signing bonus of $4 million. Chatsworth teammate Matt Dominguez was chosen by the Florida Marlins with the 12th overall pick of the amateur draft. The pair became just the sixth set of high school teammates to be selected in the first round of the same draft.

Entering 2009, Moustakas was widely regarded as one of the top baseball prospects in all of minor league baseball. The Sporting News ranked Moustakas as the 13th-best prospect overall, while MLB.com listed Moustakas as their 11th-best prospect in all of baseball. Moustakas, however, had trouble adjusting to the Carolina League in 2009. While his power remained, his ability to hit for a high average went down significantly as he adjusted to the new level of competition. Moustakas' power and average quickly returned to form after being called up to Double-A ball the following year — as of July 13, 2010, Moustakas was hitting .352 with 21 homers and 76 runs batted in (RBIs) in AA Northwest Arkansas. On July 15, 2010, he was promoted to Triple-A Omaha. On August 30, 2010, Moustakas was named the 2010 Texas League Player of the Year and on the same night, he set an Omaha Royals record with three home runs and 11 RBIs in one game. Moustakas won the Joe Bauman Home Run Award for most home runs in minor league baseball, winning a tiebreaker with Mark Trumbo. On May 22, 2014, he was demoted to Triple-A Omaha after batting just .152 through 139 plate appearances.

=== Kansas City Royals ===
Moustakas had his contract purchased by Kansas City on June 9, 2011. He made his debut the following night against the Los Angeles Angels of Anaheim, going 1–3 with a walk and a run scored. His first major league hit came in his third plate appearance against Ervin Santana, where he would eventually score in the 4–2 win. Moustakas went on to play in 89 games for Kansas City in 2011, finishing the season with five home runs, thirty RBIs, and a season batting average of .263.

On February 18, 2012, the Royals announced they had signed Moustakas to a one-year contract for the 2012 season. No financial terms of the deal were released. During the 2012 season Moustakas set a new club record for K.C., playing 47 straight games without an error. He also made 41 double plays far besting the previous mark of 34 Mark Teahen set in 2006. Moustakas finished the year batting .242 with a .296 OBP with 20 home runs and 73 RBIs, also hitting 34 doubles.

In 2013, he batted .233 with a .287 on base percentage, 12 home runs, and 42 RBI. He also led all American League third basemen with 16 errors.

Moustakas struggled early in the 2014 season. On May 22, 2014, he was demoted to Triple-A Omaha after batting just .152 through 139 plate appearances, though he led the team in homers with 4. On June 1, Moustakas was recalled from AAA. He began to hit more consistently after this. He finished the season batting .212, while hitting 15 homers and driving in 54 runs. Moustakas tore through the 2014 postseason, hitting five home runs, including a go-ahead solo shot in the 11th inning of Game 1 against the Los Angeles Angels of Anaheim. He led all 2014 postseason players in homers. The Royals would then lose to the San Francisco Giants in the 2014 World Series.

In 2015, Moustakas carried over his success from the postseason and had a batting average at or above .300 right up until the All-Star break. He was selected to the 2015 All-Star Game via the All-Star Game Final Vote. On May 15 against the Yankees, he went 4-for-5 with a homer shy for hitting for the cycle. Moustakas was placed on the family emergency list twice during the first half of the 2015 season. On September 12, Moustakas set a new Royals franchise record against the Baltimore Orioles with 9 RBI, eclipsing the previous mark of seven. He hit a grand slam, a three-run home run and a two-run single in the 14–6 win. In 147 games, Moustakas batted .284 with 22 home runs and 82 RBI. The Royals won the World Series against the New York Mets to win the franchise's first world championship in 30 years.

On May 7, 2016, Moustakas was placed on the 15-day disabled list due to a fractured left thumb. On May 22, Moustakas suffered a right knee injury while colliding with teammate Alex Gordon in an attempt to fetch a pop up in foul territory. The next day, an MRI revealed that there was a torn ACL in the knee, ending Moustakas' 2016 season.

Moustakas won the All-Star Final Vote for the second time of his career on July 6, 2017, and participated in the Home Run Derby. On July 28, 2017, Moustakas hit his 30th home run of the season at Fenway Park, becoming the fastest Royal ever to reach the mark in a season. Moustakas had 38 home runs that season, a new Royals single season record.

Moustakas became a free agent after the 2017 season once he turned down the Royals' $17.4 million qualifying offer. Expecting to receive a longer-term deal on the market for more guaranteed money, he instead found no interest from other teams.

On March 10, 2018, Moustakas re-signed with the Royals for one year and $6.5 million, with an opportunity to earn another $2.2 million in incentives. The deal also included a mutual $15 million option for 2019.

=== Milwaukee Brewers ===
On July 28, 2018, the Royals traded Moustakas to the Milwaukee Brewers in exchange for Brett Phillips and Jorge López. With the Brewers, he batted .256/.326/.441.

On October 4, 2018, Moustakas hit a walk-off single in the 10th inning of NLDS Game 1 vs the Colorado Rockies, giving the Brewers a 3–2 win and a 1–0 series lead. The Brewers swept the series in three games, but would proceed to lose the NLCS to the Los Angeles Dodgers 4 games to 3. On October 30, 2018, Moustakas declined his half of a mutual option for 2019 and became a free agent.

On February 19, 2019, Moustakas re-signed with the Brewers, inking a one-year, $10 million deal with a mutual option for 2020. He declined his half of the option and became a free agent after the 2019 season.

=== Cincinnati Reds ===
On December 5, 2019, Moustakas signed a four-year, $64 million contract with the Cincinnati Reds, the largest free agent deal in Reds history. In 44 games for Cincinnati in 2020, Moustakas slashed .230/.331/.468 with 8 home runs and 27 RBI. Moustakas wore number 9, as 8, his previous number he wore for most of his career, was retired by the Reds for Joe Morgan.

On May 20, 2021, Moustakas was placed on the injured list after suffering a right heel contusion. After re-aggravating the injury, Moustakas was transferred to the 60-day injured list on June 19. Moustakas was activated from the injured list on August 6 and hit three doubles in his return to the lineup. He finished the year hitting .208/.282/.372 with 6 home runs and 22 RBI across 62 games.

Moustakas hit his 200th career home run on July 10, 2022. Moustakas played in 78 games for Cincinnati in 2022, posting a .214/.295/.345 batting line with 7 home runs and 25 RBI. The Reds designated Moustakas for assignment on December 22, 2022, following the signing of Curt Casali. He was released on January 5, 2023.

=== Colorado Rockies ===
On March 5, 2023, Moustakas signed a minor league contract with the Colorado Rockies organization. On March 25, the Rockies announced Moustakas had made the Opening Day roster after hitting .367/.387/.700 with two home runs in 31 plate appearances during spring training. He was formally selected to the 40-man roster the same day.

=== Los Angeles Angels ===
On June 24, 2023, the Rockies traded Moustakas to the Los Angeles Angels in exchange for Connor Van Scoyoc. This came after a 25–1 loss the Rockies had suffered to the Angels, with the two teams in the midst of a three–game series. In 65 games for the Angels, Moustakas hit .236/.256/.371 with 8 home runs and 31 RBI.

=== Chicago White Sox ===
On February 14, 2024, Moustakas signed a minor league contract with the Chicago White Sox. He was released by Chicago on March 22 after failing to make the Opening Day roster.

=== Retirement ===
On March 3, 2025, Moustakas announced his retirement from professional baseball. The Kansas City Royals announced that Moustakas would sign a one-day contract to retire as a Royal, and be honored in a ceremony before the team's May 31 game versus the Detroit Tigers.

== Personal life ==
The son of Connie and Mike Moustakas, a former college football player for UCLA, Mike was born in Los Angeles on September 11, 1988, and grew up in the Los Angeles area. He is of Greek descent, as his grandfather was born in Greece, and he flew a Greek flag above his locker in the Royals' clubhouse. He is the nephew of author, MLB player and former New York Mets hitting coach Tom Robson, who gave Moustakas hitting tips growing up. Moustakas' mother died in 2015 after a long illness.

When not playing baseball Moustakas enjoys golf and fishing. Asked by USA Today what career he would enjoy other than baseball, Moustakas expressed an interest in being a firefighter.

Moustakas and his wife, Stephanie, have been married since 2014, and they have three daughters and a son. They also have an Australian shepherd named Gus. They reside in Malibu, California during the offseason.
