= Florida Medicaid waiver =

Care program in Florida, United States

Florida has several Medicaid Waiver Programs. Medicaid Waiver Programs allow recipients to 'waive' institutionalization and instead choose to direct services to assist them to live in the community. Waiver program services may offer additional supports and services than provided by traditional Medicaid.

== The HCBS/DD Waiver Program ==
The Home and Community Based Services Waiver, also called the HCBS/DD Waiver or "Big" Waiver, is one of Florida's Medicaid Waiver Programs that assists people who have disabilities. These disabilities include: Cognitive impairments, spina bifida, cerebral palsy, Prader-Willi syndrome, Down syndrome, Phelan-McDermid syndrome, and Autism. The HCBS/DD medicaid waiver program helps cover the cost for things that regular medicaid does not pay for.

The HCBS Waiver currently has 28 services and there is a spending cap based on the individuals needs. However, services must be "medically necessary".

Individuals that meet the following criteria are eligible to receive services under the Home and Community Based Services Waiver:

- Be under 65 years of age
- Be a Florida resident
- Be a U.S. citizen or qualified noncitizen
- File for any other benefits to which they may be entitled
- Disclose any rights to third party liability (i.e., health insurance)
- Meet the income limit of $2,523 for an individual or $5,046 for a couple (as of January 2022)
- Meet the asset limit of $2000 for an individual or $3000 for an eligible couple
- If your monthly income exceeds $2,523/month you still can benefit from Medicaid Diversion by setting up an income trust. This is a legal document and it must be done by an attorney

In 2021 there was a waiting list of over 22,000 people for this waiver. Some of the people on the waiting list receive services from the FSL waiver.

== The FSL Waiver Program ==
The Florida Supported Living Waiver, also called the FSL Waiver or "Little" Waiver is another Florida Medicaid Waiver Program. This Waiver currently has a spending cap of $14,792.00. There are eleven services on this waiver. Many people on the FSL Waiver are waiting to get on the HCBS Waiver. The FSL Waiver also assists people who have disabilities, and the requirements to receive services are the same as the HCBS Waiver.

=== Support Coordination ===
Support Coordinators for the HCBS and FSL Waiver Programs assist people who have disabilities in accessing supports and services. Natural resources are used whenever possible. Florida Medicaid is "The Payer of Last Resort".

The rate for support coordination was reduced in 2011. The highest rate paid over the 18 years of the waiver was $161.60 per month, for each person served. In mid 2016 the rate was changed from the lowered $125.71 per month to $148.69, for adults and for children living in group homes, and from $62.86 to $74.35 for children living in family homes. Support Coordinators are on call 24/7. The average caseload size has changed. The high of 40 was reached in 1991; the low, 36.

The maximum number of individuals served by a single support coordinator is 43 full-time recipients.Adults count as 1 full-time recipient and children a half time recipient.

With the change in rates and caseload came changes as to the minimum frequency of visits. Adults in supported living must be seen at least once a month, and at least once every 3 months in their home. Adults in the family home must be seen at a minimum once every three months, at least once every 6 months in their home. Children in the family home must be seen at a minimum once every six months and at least once a year in the family home. Anyone in Residential Placement, group homes or foster homes, must be seen monthly. Several other services have been eliminated.

== History ==
Prior to Medicaid Waiver Programs,{1991} many people who had disabilities were served in nursing homes or institutions. The HCBS and FSL Waivers help people to live in their communities by providing supports and services to people who live in the community. It is believed that it is less expensive for people to receive services in the community, rather than in a nursing home or an institution.
