= Medicaid Home and Community-Based Services Waivers =

Centers for Medicare and Medicaid Services (Medicaid administrator) logo

Home and Community-Based Services waivers (HCBS waivers), commonly known as Section 1915(c) waivers, 42 U.S.C. Ch. 7, § 1396n §§ 1915(c), are programs through which U.S. states can provide long-term services and supports (LTSS) to Medicaid beneficiaries in their homes and communities rather than institutional settings. Authorized under Section 1915(c) of the Social Security Act, the waivers allow states to provide a broad range of home- and community-based services not otherwise available under a state's Medicaid plan, to people who would otherwise require Medicaid-funded institutional care.

States may target Section 1915(c) waivers to particular populations and limit the number of people enrolled. Section 1915(c) programs may cap enrollment, and when demand exceeds available capacity, states may maintain waiting lists, also known as interest lists, planning lists, or registries.

Section 1915(c) waivers are the most commonly used Medicaid waiver authority for providing HCBS. In 2022, nearly 1.8 million Medicaid beneficiaries received services through Section 1915(c) waivers, accounting for approximately 22% of Medicaid HCBS recipients and $62.4 billion in expenditures. As of March 2025, 46 states and the District of Columbia operated 267 approved Section 1915(c) waivers.

The waiver program has been part of a broader shift in Medicaid long-term care from institutional toward community-based services. Across Medicaid's waiver and state-plan authorities, HCBS increased from 1.1% of Medicaid LTSS expenditures in 1981 to 63.8% in 2023.

== History ==
Before the creation of Section 1915(c), Medicaid provided limited coverage for long-term care in non-institutional settings, while its eligibility and benefit structure made institutional care more readily available. Congress added Section 1915(c) to the Social Security Act through the Omnibus Budget Reconciliation Act of 1981, allowing states, with federal approval, to depart from certain Medicaid requirements in order to provide home- and community-based alternatives to institutional care.

Section 1915(c) gave states flexibility in designing services for people who would otherwise require institutional care. States could target waiver programs to particular populations and offer services beyond those otherwise available through their Medicaid state plans. Waiver programs were also subject to a cost-neutrality requirement under which estimated Medicaid expenditures for waiver services could not exceed the estimated cost of institutional care for the same population.

Use of HCBS expanded substantially during the following decades. In Olmstead v. L.C. (1999), the U.S. Supreme Court held that the unjustified institutional isolation of people with disabilities can constitute discrimination under Title II of the Americans with Disabilities Act of 1990. The decision became an important influence on subsequent federal and state efforts to expand access to community-based long-term services and supports.

Congress subsequently created additional Medicaid authorities for providing HCBS. The Deficit Reduction Act of 2005 established a state-plan option for HCBS under Section 1915(i) and a separate option for self-directed personal assistance services under Section 1915(j). The Affordable Care Act of 2010 added Section 1915(k), known as Community First Choice, which provides another state-plan option for community-based attendant services and supports. In 2014, the Centers for Medicare and Medicaid Services adopted the HCBS Settings Rule, establishing standards intended to ensure that Medicaid-funded HCBS settings support community integration, autonomy, and individual choice.

== Program structure and eligibility ==
Section 1915(c) waivers are administered by state Medicaid agencies subject to approval and oversight by the Centers for Medicare & Medicaid Services (CMS). States may operate multiple waiver programs, often offering different packages of services to different populations. Initial waivers are generally approved for three years, with five-year renewal periods, and states must obtain CMS approval to renew or amend them.

The term waiver refers to requirements of federal Medicaid law that the Secretary of Health and Human Services may waive for these programs. These include state-wideness, allowing a state to operate a waiver in a limited geographic area, and comparability, allowing waiver services to differ in amount, duration, or scope for particular eligibility groups. States may also use special financial eligibility rules that can allow people to qualify for Medicaid-funded community services when they would otherwise qualify for Medicaid only in an institutional setting.

Federal regulations require Section 1915(c) waivers to serve specified target groups: people who are aged or disabled, people with intellectual or developmental disabilities, and people with mental illness, as well as subgroups of these populations. States may further define target populations according to characteristics such as age or diagnosis.

Eligibility generally includes both financial and functional requirements. To receive Section 1915(c) services, an individual must have a level of need that would otherwise qualify for Medicaid-funded institutional care, such as care in a nursing facility, hospital, or intermediate care facility for individuals with intellectual disabilities. States establish their own criteria for determining whether an individual meets the required institutional level of care. Meeting an institutional level-of-care standard does not require a person to have previously lived in an institution. Section 1915(c) services may be used to support people who would otherwise require institutional care.

== Covered services ==
Federal law permits states to provide a broad range of services through Section 1915(c) waivers. These include case management, homemaker and home health aide services, personal care, adult day health, habilitation, and respite care. With federal approval, states may provide additional services such as home modifications, skilled nursing, non-medical transportation, specialized medical equipment, personal emergency response systems, adult foster care, and assisted-living services.

Habilitation services may include residential and day habilitation, certain prevocational and educational services, and supported employment. States have substantial flexibility to name and define waiver services, resulting in differences among programs and states. Section 1915(c) waivers generally may not pay for room and board in community residential settings.

Waiver services must be furnished under an individualized, person-centered service plan. Federal requirements provide that planning should reflect the individual's needs, strengths, preferences, and goals and identify the services and supports used to meet them.

Some waiver programs also permit participants to self-direct services. Medicaid's separate Section 1915(j) authority allows states to offer self-directed personal assistance services through state-plan programs or existing Section 1915(c) waivers, including options for participants to recruit and train workers and exercise control over aspects of an individual service budget.

== Financing and enrollment limits ==
Medicaid is jointly financed by the federal government and the states. CMS approval of a Section 1915(c) waiver is contingent on the state demonstrating that the waiver will be cost neutral in each year of operation. The calculation considers Medicaid expenditures for waiver and other Medicaid services received by waiver participants and the Medicaid costs that would have been incurred in the absence of the waiver.

Section 1915(c) waivers differ from Medicaid state-plan services in allowing states to limit enrollment. States establish a maximum unduplicated number of waiver participants and may also use point-in-time enrollment limits, phased enrollment, or reserved capacity for specified groups, such as people transitioning from institutions or experiencing a crisis.

Enrollment limits give states a mechanism for controlling waiver expenditures. When available capacity is insufficient to meet demand, however, they can result in waiting lists for waiver services.

== Waiting lists ==
When demand for waiver services exceeds available capacity, states may maintain waiting lists, sometimes called interest lists, planning lists, or registries. Waiting lists may develop when approved program slots are filled or when a state does not fund the maximum number of slots authorized under its CMS-approved waiver.

States use different methods to determine who receives an available waiver slot. Some use chronological systems, while others consider factors such as level of need, urgency, crisis circumstances, or other priority criteria. In a 2020 review, the Medicaid and CHIP Payment and Access Commission (MACPAC) examined 254 approved Section 1915(c) waivers and found that 199 documented how their waiting lists were managed.

The meaning of being on a waiting list varies among states. Some states determine whether a person meets waiver eligibility requirements before adding the person to a list, while others maintain broader lists that can include people who have not undergone a complete eligibility determination. People waiting for waiver enrollment may also receive Medicaid state-plan services, although those services may not provide the same amount, scope, or duration of HCBS.

Because state practices differ, national waiting-list totals are not standardized measures of unmet need. MACPAC has described waiting lists as an imperfect proxy for unmet HCBS need while also finding that their existence can indicate insufficient state capacity. Differences in screening practices also complicate comparisons among states.

In 2024, 40 states reported waiting lists for Section 1915(c) and Section 1115 HCBS waiver programs totaling an estimated 710,000 people. The average reported waiting time was 40 months, although it varied substantially by population; people with intellectual and developmental disabilities waited an average of 50 months. Because the underlying survey combines some Section 1915(c) and Section 1115 waiting lists and states use different screening practices, the figures do not represent a standardized count of people determined eligible for Section 1915(c) services.

Federal regulations adopted in 2024 will require states with capped Section 1915(c) enrollment to report annually on their waiting lists. Required information includes whether eligibility is screened before people are added, whether and how often people are rescreened, the number of people waiting, and the average length of time newly enrolled participants spent on a waiting list. States must comply with these reporting requirements beginning July 9, 2027.

== HCBS Settings Rule ==
In 2014, CMS adopted regulations establishing federal standards for settings in which Medicaid HCBS may be provided. The HCBS Settings Rule shifted federal policy away from defining community-based settings primarily by their locations or physical characteristics and towards the nature and quality of participants' experiences.

Under the rule, qualifying HCBS settings must support access to the broader community; opportunities for employment and community life; control of personal resources; and individual choice regarding services and providers. The regulations also establish protections concerning privacy, dignity, respect, autonomy, freedom from coercion and restraint, and person-centered planning.

Provider-owned or controlled residential settings are subject to additional conditions concerning privacy, control over schedule and activities, access to food and visitors, and physical accessibility. Modifications to certain requirements must be based on a specific assessed need and documented in the individual's person-centered service plan.

States were required to evaluate settings receiving Medicaid HCBS funding and develop transition plans for programs that did not fully meet the federal standards. Implementation occurred over an extended transition period.

== Access and administration ==
Access to HCBS can depend on factors beyond formal waiver eligibility and enrollment. Section 1915(c) programs rely on direct-care workers and other providers to deliver authorized services, and shortages in the HCBS workforce can reduce the ability of Medicaid programs to provide services in homes and communities.

Because states design and administer their own waiver programs within federal requirements, eligibility criteria, covered services, enrollment limits, and waiting-list procedures vary among states and among waivers within the same state. The availability of particular waiver services can therefore differ according to where a beneficiary lives and which waiver population the person qualifies for.

The use of multiple Section 1915 authorities also creates administrative complexity for state Medicaid programs. In 2025, MACPAC identified differences in federal requirements across HCBS authorities as a source of administrative burden and recommended extending the renewal period for Section 1915(c) waivers and targeted Section 1915(i) state-plan amendments from five to ten years.

== Documentary and media coverage ==
HCBS programs and waiver waiting lists have been the subject of documentary and television reporting. The 2021 documentary 6,000 Waiting follows three Georgians with cerebral palsy affected by the state's Medicaid waiver waiting list. The 2026 documentary Life After Olmstead follows three disabled residents of Louisville, Kentucky, who receive community-based services, examining their experiences with caregiving, employment, independence, and community life. In 2023, PBS NewsHour examined HCBS waiver waiting lists in Oklahoma as part of its Disability Reframed series, following families seeking services and the state's efforts to reduce its waiting list.

== Other Medicaid HCBS authorities ==
Section 1915(c) is one of several statutory authorities states may use to provide Medicaid HCBS.

Section 1915(i) permits states to offer HCBS as a Medicaid state-plan benefit using state-defined needs-based eligibility criteria that are less stringent than the institutional level-of-care criteria applicable to Section 1915(c) waivers.

Section 1915(j) permits self-directed personal assistance services and can be used in conjunction with services provided under an existing Section 1915(c) waiver. Participants may exercise authority over matters including provider selection, training, and aspects of service budgets.

Section 1915(k), known as Community First Choice, allows states to provide home- and community-based attendant services and supports as a Medicaid state-plan benefit. The option was created by the Affordable Care Act and provides participating states with an enhanced federal matching rate for qualifying expenditures.

States may also provide HCBS through Section 1115 demonstration waivers. These authorities can operate alongside Section 1915(c) waivers as components of a state's broader Medicaid long-term-services system.

== See also ==
- Medicaid waiver
- Olmstead v. L.C.
- Least restrictive environment
- Florida Medicaid waiver
- North Carolina's 1915(b)(c) Waiver Program
- Utah's HCBS ID/RC Waiver
