= Medicaid waiver =

Medicaid Waiver programs help provide services to people who would otherwise be in an institution, nursing home, or hospital to receive long-term care in the community. Prior to 1991, the Federal Medicaid program paid for services only if a person lived in an institution. The approval of Federal Medicaid Waiver programs allowed states to provide services to consumers in their homes and in their communities.

== Types of Medicaid Waiver Programs ==
- Katie Beckett or TEFRA waivers: allow children under the age of nineteen to receive medical care in their home without regard to their parents' income level, provided the cost of in-home care is less or equal to cost of providing the care in a hospital setting.
- Section 1115 Research & Demonstration Projects: States can apply for program flexibility to test new or existing approaches to financing and delivering Medicaid and CHIP.
- Section 1915(b) Managed Care Waivers: States can apply for waivers to provide services through managed care delivery systems or otherwise limit people's choice of providers.
- Section 1915(c) Home and Community-Based Services Waivers: States can apply for waivers to provide long-term care services in home and community settings rather than institutional settings.
- Concurrent Section 1915(b) and 1915(c) Waivers: States can apply to simultaneously implement two types of waivers to provide a continuum of services to the elderly and people with disabilities, as long as all Federal requirements for both programs are met.
