= Hiawatha, Iowa =

- City
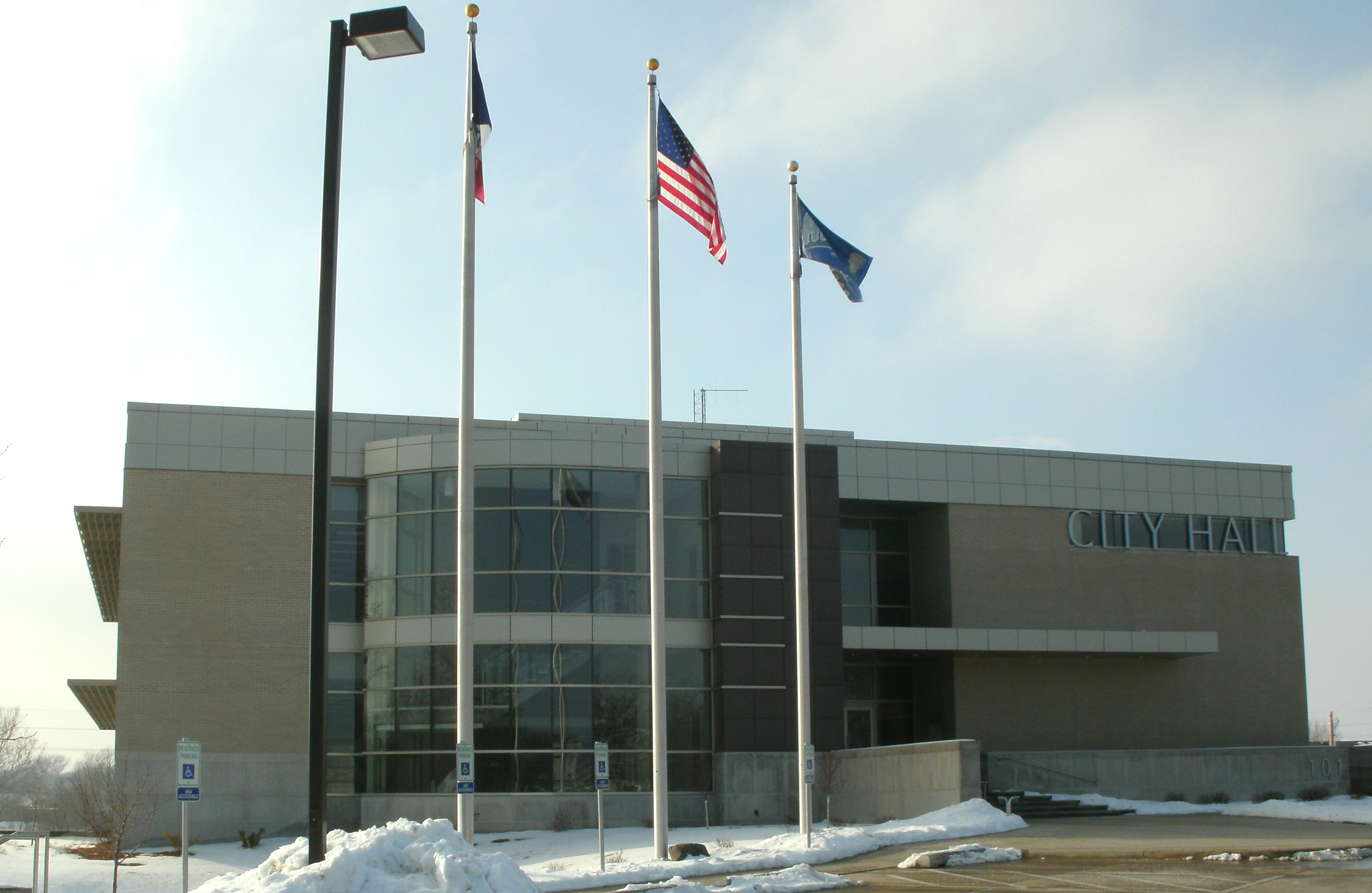
- Hiawatha City Hall

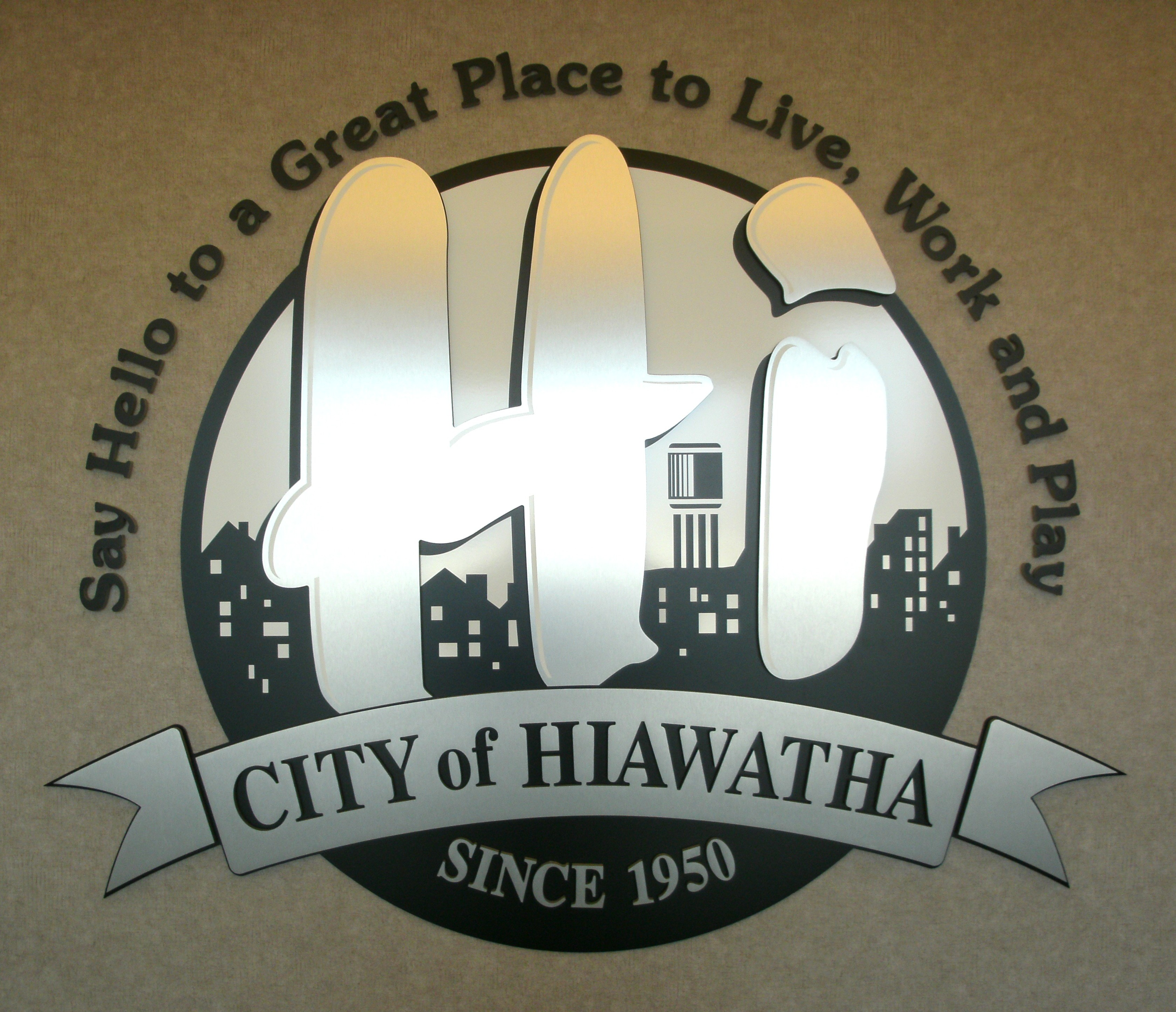
- Flag Seal
- Motto(s): Say hello to a great place to live, work and play
- Location in the State of Iowa

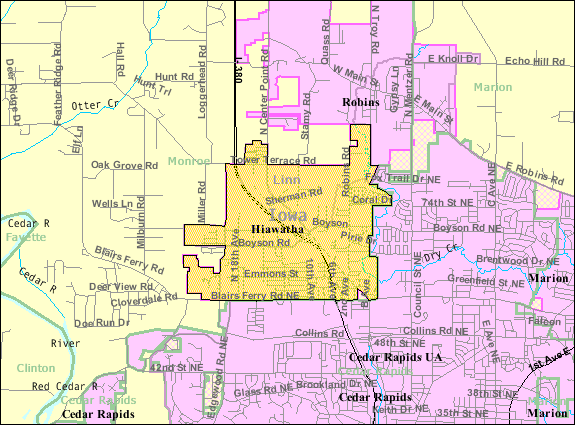
- Detailed map of Hiawatha, Iowa
- Coordinates: 42°03′18″N 91°41′28″W
- Country: United States
- State: Iowa
- County: Linn
- Incorporated: June 12, 1950

Government
  - Type: Mayor–Council

Area
  - Total: 4.77 sq mi (12.36 km^{2})
  - Land: 4.76 sq mi (12.34 km^{2})
  - Water: 0.0039 sq mi (0.01 km^{2})
- Elevation: 843 ft (257 m)

Population (2020)
  - Total: 7,183
  - Density: 1,507.4/sq mi (582.01/km^{2})
- Time zone: UTC-6 (CST)
  - Summer (DST): UTC-5 (CDT)
- ZIP code: 52233
- Area code: 319
- FIPS code: 19-35940
- GNIS feature ID: 2394368
- Website: www.hiawatha-iowa.com

Hiawatha is a city in Linn County, Iowa, United States. It is a suburb located in the northwestern side of Cedar Rapids and is part of the Cedar Rapids Metropolitan Statistical Area. The population was 7,183 at the time of the 2020 census, an increase from 6,480 in 2000.

== History ==
In 1946, Fay Clark, an entrepreneur of several ventures located in Linn County north of Cedar Rapids, Iowa, had a vision of houses and a highway running through a new city. In 1950 Clark and another 45 residents signed a petition seeking to become the 17th incorporated town in Linn County. The town was named after Clark's trailer company. That same year he and Henry Katz of Marion established the Linn County Fire Association to help provide fire protection to rural communities. Clark served as mayor of Hiawatha from 1950 to 1958, and again from 1961 to 1963. Clark died in 1991 at the age of 84.

Hiawatha residents celebrated the dedication of their new City Hall on May 17, 2008.

Hiawatha celebrated its 60th anniversary in May 2010.

Hiawatha celebrated its 75th anniversary in June 2025.

== Geography ==
According to the United States Census Bureau, the city has a total area of 4.23 square miles (10.96 km^{2}), all land.

The elevation of Hiawatha is 850 feet (260 m) above sea level.

Hiawatha's population density is estimated at 1884 people per square mile which is considered low for urban areas.

=== Climate ===
Monthly Normal, Record High and Low Temperatures, and precipitation
Month	Jan	Feb	Mar	Apr	May	Jun	Jul	Aug	Sep	Oct	Nov	Dec
Rec High °F	68	73	88	94	104	103	110	108	105	94	80	69
Norm High °F	28	35	47	62	73	82	85	83	76	64	46	33
Norm Low °F	12	18	25	39	50	60	64	62	54	42	30	17
Rec Low °F	-27	-28	-17	3	24	36	42	37	22	-2	-10	-28
Precip (in)	1.13	1.10	2.08	3.46	4.50	4.80	4.47	4.73	3.79	2.58	2.50	1.48
Source: Weather.com

== Demographics ==
Historical population
Census	Pop.	Note	%±
1960	1,336		—
1970	2,416		80.8%
1980	4,825		99.7%
1990	4,986		3.3%
2000	6,480		30.0%
2010	7,024		8.4%
2020	7,183		2.3%
U.S. Decennial Census

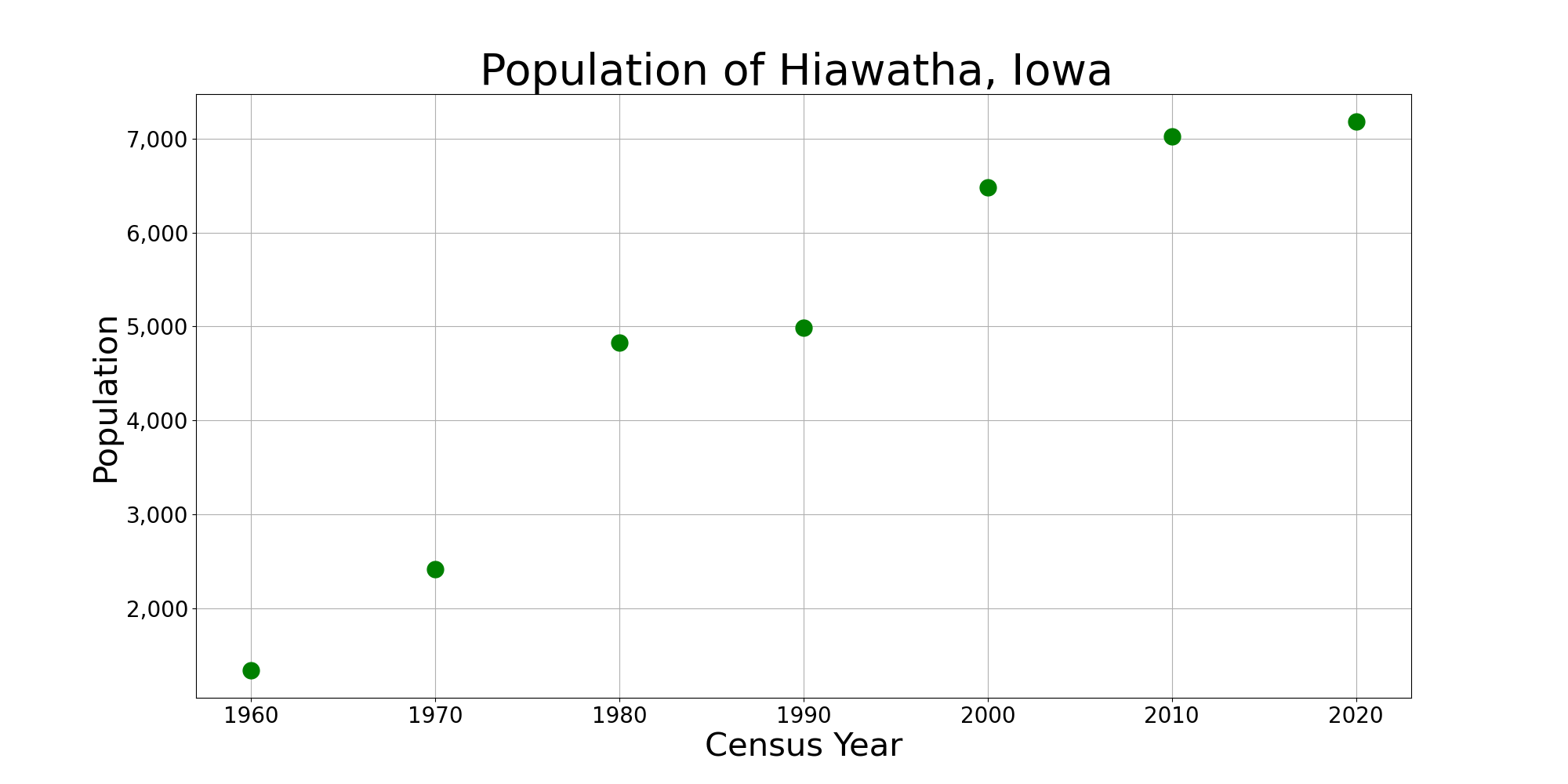
The population of Hiawatha, Iowa from US census data

=== 2020 census ===
As of the 2020 census, Hiawatha had a population of 7,183, with 3,154 households and 1,861 families residing in the city. The population density was 1,514.6 inhabitants per square mile (584.8/km^{2}). There were 3,332 housing units at an average density of 702.6 per square mile (271.3/km^{2}).

The median age was 38.6 years. 22.0% of residents were under the age of 18 and 17.7% were 65 years of age or older. 24.2% of residents were under the age of 20; 7.0% were between the ages of 20 and 24; 26.2% were from 25 to 44; and 24.9% were from 45 to 64. For every 100 females, there were 99.1 males, and for every 100 females age 18 and over there were 98.3 males age 18 and over. The gender makeup of the city was 49.8% male and 50.2% female.

There were 3,154 households, of which 27.9% had children under the age of 18 living in them. Of all households, 42.0% were married-couple households, 8.0% were cohabiting couple households, 23.1% were households with a male householder and no spouse or partner present, and 26.9% were households with a female householder and no spouse or partner present. 41.0% of all households were non-families, 34.4% of all households were made up of individuals, and 10.8% had someone living alone who was 65 years of age or older.

There were 3,332 housing units, of which 5.3% were vacant. The homeowner vacancy rate was 1.1% and the rental vacancy rate was 8.3%. 98.3% of residents lived in urban areas, while 1.7% lived in rural areas.

Racial composition as of the 2020 census
Race	Number	Percent
White	5,810	80.9%
Black or African American	492	6.8%
American Indian and Alaska Native	7	0.1%
Asian	316	4.4%
Native Hawaiian and Other Pacific Islander	14	0.2%
Some other race	100	1.4%
Two or more races	444	6.2%
Hispanic or Latino (of any race)	274	3.8%

=== 2010 census ===
As of the census of 2010, there were 7,024 people, 3,071 households, and 1,796 families residing in the city. The population density was 1,660.5 inhabitants per square mile (641.1/km^{2}). There were 3,310 housing units at an average density of 782.5 per square mile (302.1/km^{2}). The racial makeup of the city was 88.9% White, 5.1% African American, 0.2% Native American, 2.2% Asian, 0.2% Pacific Islander, 0.8% from other races, and 2.5% from two or more races. Hispanic or Latino of any race were 2.3% of the population.

There were 3,071 households, of which 29.7% had children under the age of 18 living with them, 42.0% were married couples living together, 11.9% had a female householder with no husband present, 4.5% had a male householder with no wife present, and 41.5% were non-families. 33.3% of all households were made up of individuals, and 8.1% had someone living alone who was 65 years of age or older. The average household size was 2.25 and the average family size was 2.89.

The median age in the city was 37 years. 23.8% of residents were under the age of 18; 9% were between the ages of 18 and 24; 27.7% were from 25 to 44; 26% were from 45 to 64; and 13.5% were 65 years of age or older. The gender makeup of the city was 48.8% male and 51.2% female.

=== 2000 census ===
As of the census of 2000, there were 6,480 people, 2,859 households, and 1,663 families residing in the city. The population density was 1,834.3 inhabitants per square mile (708.2/km^{2}). There were 2,979 housing units at an average density of 843.3 per square mile (325.6/km^{2}). The racial makeup of the city was 94.24% White, 2.16% African American, 0.31% Native American, 1.53% Asian, 0.37% from other races, and 1.39% from two or more races. Hispanic or Latino of any race were 1.33% of the population.

There were 2,859 households, out of which 29.5% had children under the age of 18 living with them, 44.6% were married couples living together, 10.2% had a female householder with no husband present, and 41.8% were non-families. 33.1% of all households were made up of individuals, and 5.6% had someone living alone who was 65 years of age or older. The average household size was 2.24 and the average family size was 2.89.

Age spread: 23.6% under the age of 18, 12.1% from 18 to 24, 35.4% from 25 to 44, 19.4% from 45 to 64, and 9.6% who were 65 years of age or older. The median age was 32 years. For every 100 females, there were 95.8 males. For every 100 females age 18 and over, there were 95.8 males.

The median income for a household in the city was $40,799, and the median income for a family was $47,135. Males had a median income of $37,277 versus $25,394 for females. The per capita income for the city was $22,664. About 3.4% of families and 4.5% of the population were below the poverty line, including 5.6% of those under age 18 and 1.7% of those age 65 or over.

== Parks and recreation ==
The city of Hiawatha maintains five parks . Several parks have free Wifi & Little Free Libraries.

- Guthridge Park Located on Emmons Street between 7th and 10th
- Tucker Park Located on B Avenue
- Clark Park Park Located off N. 18th Avenue
- Turtle Creek Located off Fitzroy Road
- Gazebo/Basin Park Located on N 12th Ave between Litchfield and Lyndhurst Drive.

=== Nature trails ===
Cedar Valley Nature Trail

Located on Boyson Road in Hiawatha is a trailhead for the Cedar Valley Nature Trail. The trailhead is furnished with picnic tables, restrooms, maps and information about the trail, and parking.

The main trail is a continuous path just under 52 miles (84 km) long running northwest from Hiawatha to Evansdale, with the first 4 miles (6.4 km) of the route north from Hiawatha paved with asphalt. The first 16 miles (26 km) going south from Evansdale are also paved with asphalt, the remaining trail is crushed and packed limestone. The trail has wildflowers and pockets of native remnant prairie grasses that have been enlarged through the process of burning surrounding brush and non-native plants. The trail is also known to have abundant wildlife and birds to observe. Although a fee was charged on the southern part of the trail at one time, the entire trail is now free.

Other trails

A connecting segment of trail continues south from the Cedar Valley Nature Trail head through Hiawatha to connect with the Cedar River trail a 12.6-mile (20.3 km) trail in neighboring Cedar Rapids. The city also maintains smaller, unconnected looped walking trails at all three city parks.

=== Farmers market ===
The Hiawatha farmers market is located in the 10th Avenue parking lot of Guthridge Park. For the 2011 year, the market will be open beginning April 24 and running through October 30 on Sundays from 11:00am to 2:00pm (local time). Depending on the day, 25 or more entrepreneurs from the area set up their own displays and sell home grown and home made products. These include, but are not limited to: fresh vegetables, fruits, and flowers, an assortment of baked products, preserved food products, arts, and crafts.

== Government ==
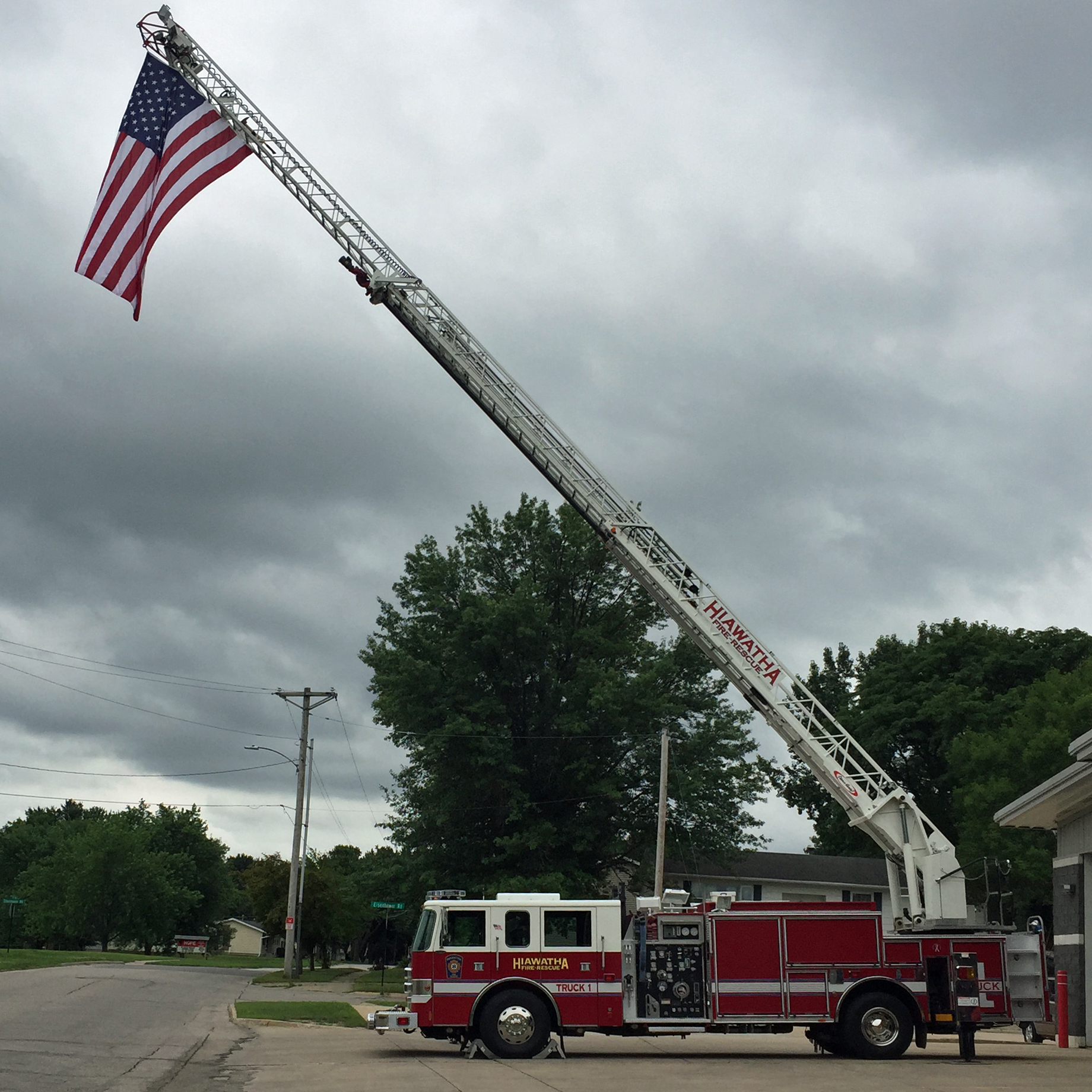

Hiawatha is governed by the Mayor with city council form of government, utilizing several departments, boards, and commissions.
The recently built City Hall (dedicated in 2007) is located at 101 Emmons Street Hiawatha, Iowa 52233. The building was designed to include not only the city government and various departments but also includes a Community center and public meeting rooms.

=== Police department ===
The Hiawatha Police Department is located in the lower level of the City Hall building. The department has 14 full-time sworn officers, two reserve police officers and special agent “Reso”, a K-9 unit. Special Agent "Mod" retired from the police department on March 21, 2012. Mod died on August 28, 2013. The Police Department's campus was expanded with the Public Safety Training & Support facility in May 2021. Its year-long construction cost $999,000 and the building ultimately takes up 7,200-square-feet.

=== Fire department ===
The Hiawatha Fire Department Station 1 is located at 60 10th Avenue; Hiawatha, Iowa 52233. Hiawatha Station 2 is located at 1550 Stamy Rd, Hiawatha, IA 52233. Station 2 opened in 2024 in order to cover the northern portion of the city. The department's personnel consist of a combination of paid and volunteer firefighters. The Hiawatha Fire Department has the only fire-based ambulance service in Linn County. HFD runs approximately 2,500 fire and EMS calls per year. In addition to these services, HFD has a contract with Mercy Medical Center - Cedar Rapids to transport patients from the Mercy Hiawatha Emergency Department to the Mercy Cedar Rapids main campus.

== Education ==
Hiawatha is included in the Cedar Rapids Community School District system.

Public schools

- Hiawatha Elementary School (home of the Cougars) is located at 603 Emmonds street in Hiawatha and opened its doors in 1958. Currently (see reference for date) the school has approximately 310 students in kindergarten through fifth grade and a staff of 64.
- Nixon Elementary School (home of the Bobcats) is located at 200 Nixon Drive in Hiawatha and opened its doors in 1970. The school's philosophy utilizes self-contained classrooms in kindergarten through fifth grade. Currently (see reference for date) Nixon has approximately 330 students and a staff of 58.
- Elementary schools: Most portions are zoned to either Hiawatha or Nixon, though some western parts are zoned to Viola Gibson Elementary School
- Secondary schools: Harding Middle School and Kennedy High School

Private schools

- Essential Montessori School is located at 1350 Blairs Ferry Road Suite A. The school has an enrollment of 46 from prekindergarten to kindergarten.
- CR Prep Middle School is located at 1 Parsons Drive in the former GoDaddy building. The school is scheduled to open in the summer of 2026.

== Transportation ==
Transit in the city is provided by Cedar Rapids Transit. Route 30 provides bus service connecting the city to the region.

== Notable people ==
- Salvatore Giunta (born 1985), first living recipient of the Medal of Honor since the Vietnam War.
- Kraig Paulsen (born 1964) Iowa State representative, Republican majority leader for the 84th Iowa General Assembly.
