= Metro High School (Iowa) =

Public secondary school in Cedar Rapids, Iowa, United States

Coordinates: 41.97271°N 91.65360°W

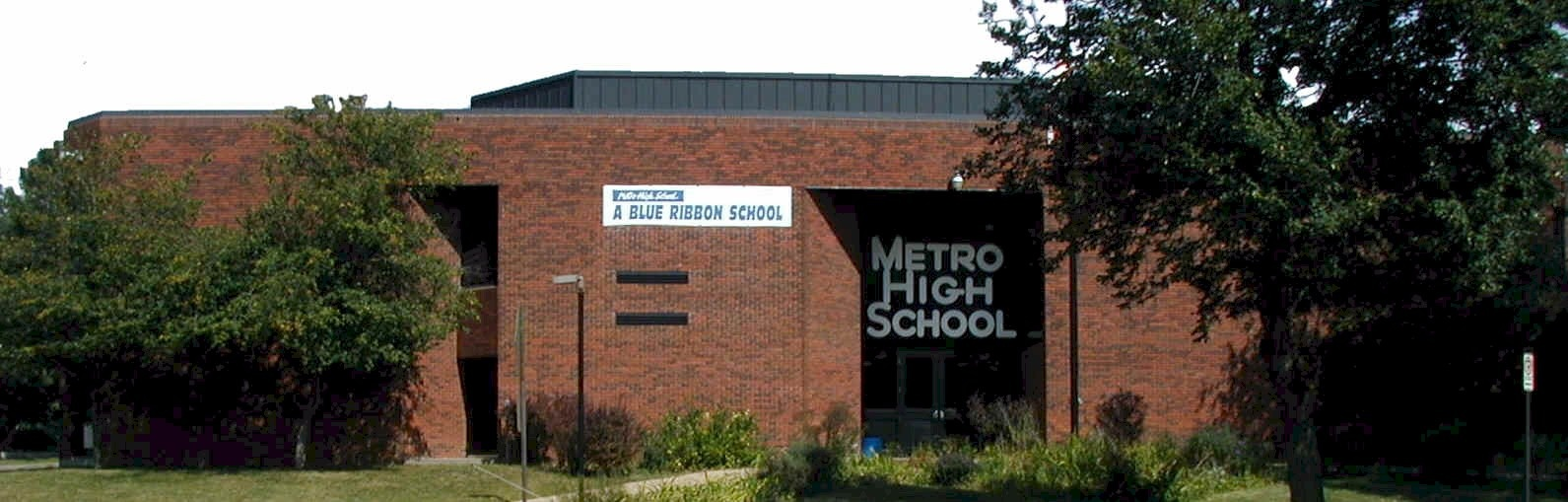

Metro High School is located in Cedar Rapids, Iowa and is part of the Cedar Rapids Community School District.

Metro: Mastering Educational Tasks Regardless of Obstacles

== History ==
In 1974, the Cedar Rapids Community School District established an alternative school in a red, brick firehouse.

Metro High School began with 3 staff and 40 students, today it is the largest alternative school in Iowa, with over 50 certified teachers and support staff serving more than 400 students.

For many years the metro mascot were known as the ferrets; however, in 2011 staff and students voted. Although several people believe the "Wolves" was the most popular mascot, after a few discussions Metro agreed on the "Phoenix".

== Awards and recognitions ==
In the 1984–85 school year, Metro High School was selected as one of the top 212 schools in the country by the United States Department of Education. In 1991 Metro received the FINE (First in the Nation in Education) award. In 1992 Metro was selected by Redbook as one of the top 140 schools in the country. In 1993 Metro won the National Secondary School Recognition Program Award for a second time. Now called the Blue Ribbon Schools Award, Metro High School was again recognized as one of the best schools in the nation, and one of two Iowa schools to win the award twice.

== See also ==
- List of high schools in Iowa
