= Cedar Rapids Community School District v. Garret F. =

- Supreme Court of the United States

Argued November 4, 1998 Decided March 3, 1999
- Full case name: Cedar Rapids Community School District v. Garret F., a minor, by his mother and next friend, Charlene F.
- Citations: 526 U.S. 66 (more) 119 S. Ct. 992; 143 L. Ed. 2d 154

Case history
- Prior: 106 F.3d 822 (8th Cir. 1997) (affirmed)

Holding
- The exception for "medical services" from IDEA's related services provision only exempts services which must be provided by a physician.

Court membership
- Chief Justice William Rehnquist Associate Justices John P. Stevens · Sandra Day O'Connor; Antonin Scalia · Anthony Kennedy; David Souter · Clarence Thomas; Ruth Bader Ginsburg · Stephen Breyer

Case opinions
- Majority: Stevens, joined by Rehnquist, O'Connor, Scalia, Souter, Ginsburg, Breyer
- Dissent: Thomas, joined by Kennedy

Laws applied
- Individuals with Disabilities Education Act

Cedar Rapids Community School District v. Garret F., 526 U.S. 66 (1999), was a United States Supreme Court case in which the Court ruled that the related services provision in the Individuals with Disabilities Education Act (IDEA) required public school districts to fund "continuous, one-on-one nursing care for disabled children" despite arguments from the school district concerning the costs of the services." The judges relied heavily on Irving Independent School District v. Tatro.

Under the Court's reading of the IDEA's relevant provisions, medical treatments such as suctioning, ventilator checks, catheterization, and others which can be administered by non-physician personnel come within the parameters of the special education law's related services. Disability advocates considered the Court decision to be a "substantial victory for families of children with disabilities." Amendments were made in the Education Flexibility Partnership Act of 1999 to increase IDEA funding as a result of the case.

== Background ==
The case arose when Garret Frey, a student who used a ventilator and a wheelchair after a childhood accident, requested that his school district fund the continuous one-on-one nursing services he required to attend school. These services included ventilator monitoring, suctioning of his tracheostomy tube, catheterization, and other health-related assistance throughout the school day.

=== Ruling ===
The central legal question was whether such continuous nursing care constituted a "related service" that the school district was obligated to provide under IDEA, or whether it fell within the statute's exclusion for "medical services." The Court, in a 7–2 decision authored by Justice John Paul Stevens, held that the school district was required to provide the services. The majority applied a bright-line test derived from Irving Independent School District v. Tatro (1984): services that can be provided by a nurse or other qualified person are "related services" under IDEA, while only those services that must be performed by a licensed physician qualify as excluded "medical services."

The majority rejected the school district's arguments that the continuous nature of the care, its complexity, or its cost should factor into the analysis. Justice Stevens emphasized that IDEA's purpose was to ensure that children with disabilities have access to a free appropriate public education, and that cost-based considerations were not part of the statutory framework for determining whether a service qualified as a related service. The decision reinforced a broad interpretation of school districts' obligations under federal disability law.

=== Dissent ===
Justice Clarence Thomas, joined by Justice Anthony Kennedy, dissented, arguing that the majority's physician-or-nurse test was formalistic and disconnected from the ordinary meaning of "medical services." Thomas contended that continuous nursing care involving ventilator management and other intensive health interventions is inherently medical in character regardless of who performs it, and that the majority's logic produced absurd results—compelling schools to provide round-the-clock nursing care while permitting them to refuse a brief physician consultation. He further argued that Congress did not intend for IDEA to transform public schools into comprehensive healthcare providers, and that the majority's interpretation effectively gutted the statutory exclusion for medical services, threatening to divert substantial educational resources away from instruction.
