= National Register of Historic Places listings in Linn County, Iowa =

Location of Linn County in Iowa

This is a list of the National Register of Historic Places listings in Linn County, Iowa.

This is intended to be a complete list of the properties and districts on the National Register of Historic Places in Linn County, Iowa, United States. Latitude and longitude coordinates are provided for many National Register properties and districts; these locations may be seen together in a map.

There are 125 properties and districts listed on the National Register in the county. Five other sites that were once listed have been removed.

This National Park Service list is complete through NPS recent listings posted December 12, 2025.

== Current listings ==
	Name on the Register	Image	Date listed	Location	City or town	Description
1	Henry D. and Juliana (Wortz) Albright House		August 27, 2020 (#100005495)	224 1st St. SW; 41°55′23″N 91°25′09″W	Mount Vernon	
2	Robert and Esther Armstrong House	Robert and Esther Armstrong House	November 16, 1989 (#89002009)	370 34th St., SE. 41°59′05″N 91°37′02″W	Cedar Rapids	
3	Ash Park Historic District	Ash Park Historic District	September 13, 1993 (#93000899)	5th-8th Aves. N., between 6th and 8th Sts., NW. 41°55′40″N 91°25′15″W	Mount Vernon	
4	Ausadie Building	Ausadie Building	December 6, 2004 (#04001324)	845 1st Ave., SE. 41°58′59″N 91°39′37″W	Cedar Rapids	
5	A. T. Averill House	A. T. Averill House	November 28, 1978 (#78001236)	1120 2nd Ave., SE; 41°59′03″N 91°39′25″W	Cedar Rapids	
6	Glenn M. and Edith Averill House	Glenn M. and Edith Averill House	July 27, 2015 (#15000472)	616 4th Ave., SE; 41°58′45″N 91°39′40″W	Cedar Rapids	
7	B Avenue NE Historic District	B Avenue NE Historic District	September 11, 2013 (#13000692)	Along B Avenue, NE, from 15th to 21st Streets; 41°59′35″N 91°38′54″W	Cedar Rapids	
8	Augustus and Elizabeth (Huntsberger) Bauman House	Augustus and Elizabeth (Huntsberger) Bauman House	August 27, 2020 (#100005489)	601 1st Ave. SW; 41°55′06″N 91°25′16″W	Mount Vernon	
9	Beach School	Beach School	September 16, 1982 (#82002630)	Northwest of Mount Vernon off U.S. Route 30; 41°59′28″N 91°28′45″W	Mount Vernon	
10	Best Oil and Refining Company Service Station	Best Oil and Refining Company Service Station	June 27, 2014 (#14000359)	624 12th Ave., SE; 41°58′22″N 91°39′15″W	Cedar Rapids	
11	Bethel African Methodist Episcopal Church	Bethel African Methodist Episcopal Church	December 18, 2013 (#13000927)	512 6th Street, SE; 41°58′39″N 91°39′37″W	Cedar Rapids	
12	Bever Woods Historic District		March 2, 2023 (#100008668)	Grande Ave. SE, 21st St. SE, Bever Ave. SE; 41°59′07″N 91°38′02″W	Cedar Rapids	
13	Bohemian Commercial Historic District	Bohemian Commercial Historic District	December 20, 2002 (#02001539)	1000 to 1300 blocks of 3rd St., SE. and the 100 and 200 blocks of 14th Ave., SE. • Boundary increase (listed March 12, 2012, refnum 12000096): Roughly bounded by 9th Ave. SE., 4th St. SE., 14th Ave. SE., 15th Ave. SW., C St. SW., 17th Ave SW. & A St. SW. 41°58′10″N 91°38′49″W	Cedar Rapids	Cedar Rapids, Iowa Multiple Property Submission
14	James W. and Ida G. Bowman House	James W. and Ida G. Bowman House	September 14, 2002 (#02001015)	1372 8th Ave. 42°02′03″N 91°35′40″W	Marion	
15	Braska House	Braska House	March 21, 1979 (#79000911)	889 2nd Ave. 42°01′43″N 91°36′02″W	Marion	
16	Luther A. and Elinore T. Brewer House	Luther A. and Elinore T. Brewer House	December 2, 2024 (#100011084)	616 10th Ave SE; 41°58′27″N 91°39′22″W	Cedar Rapids	
17	Brown Apartments	Brown Apartments	March 17, 2010 (#10000075)	1234 4th Ave. SE; 41°58′57″N 91°39′17″W	Cedar Rapids	
18	Burlington, Cedar Rapids, and Minnesota Railroad: Walker Station	Burlington, Cedar Rapids, and Minnesota Railroad: Walker Station	February 14, 1978 (#78001242)	Between Rowley and Washington Sts. 42°17′03″N 91°42′52″W	Walker	
19	C.S.P.S. Hall	C.S.P.S. Hall	November 29, 1978 (#78001237)	1105 3rd St., SE. 41°58′15″N 91°39′31″W	Cedar Rapids	A building of the Czech-Slovak Protective Society, built in 1891.
20	Calder Houses	Calder Houses	January 18, 1978 (#78001238)	1214 and 1216 2nd Ave., SE. 41°59′04″N 91°39′23″W	Cedar Rapids	
21	Cedar Rapids 2nd Avenue SE. Automobile Row Historic District	Cedar Rapids 2nd Avenue SE. Automobile Row Historic District	October 23, 2015 (#15000749)	Roughly 2nd to 3rd Aves., SE., from 6th to 8th Sts., SE. 41°58′49″N 91°39′45″W	Cedar Rapids	
22	Cedar Rapids Central Business District Commercial Historic District	Cedar Rapids Central Business District Commercial Historic District	November 2, 2015 (#15000757)	Roughly bounded by 1st & 5th Aves., SE. & 5th & 2nd Sts., SE. 41°58′39″N 91°39′56″W	Cedar Rapids	
23	Cedar Rapids Central Fire Station	Cedar Rapids Central Fire Station	April 29, 2014 (#14000175)	427 1st St., SE; 41°58′29″N 91°40′00″W	Cedar Rapids	
24	Cedar Rapids Milk Condensing Company	Cedar Rapids Milk Condensing Company	May 8, 2017 (#100000966)	525 Valor Way, SW; 41°58′21″N 91°40′07″W	Cedar Rapids	
25	Cedar Rapids Post Office and Public Building	Cedar Rapids Post Office and Public Building	November 10, 1982 (#82000413)	305 2nd Ave., SE. 41°58′42″N 91°39′58″W	Cedar Rapids	
26	Cedar Rapids Pump Company Factory and Warehouse	Cedar Rapids Pump Company Factory and Warehouse	November 6, 2012 (#12000907)	605 G Avenue NW; 41°58′48″N 91°40′53″W	Cedar Rapids	
27	Central City Commercial Historic District	Central City Commercial Historic District	March 18, 2003 (#02001027)	300 and 400 blocks of E. Main St., N. 4th St. to Commercial; 42°12′15″N 91°31′28″W	Central City	
28	Chain Lakes Bridge	Chain Lakes Bridge	May 15, 1998 (#98000529)	Pedestrian trail over the Cedar River; 42°02′59″N 91°46′32″W	Hiawatha	
29	Coggon Commercial Historic District		August 7, 2019 (#100004229)	East Main Street between 1st Street South and 3rd Street North; 42°16′49″N 91°31′51″W	Coggon	
30	Coggon Public School	Coggon Public School	September 12, 2016 (#16000605)	408 E. Linn St. 42°16′51″N 91°31′40″W	Coggon	
31	Consistory Building No. 2	Consistory Building No. 2	November 20, 1998 (#98001327)	616 A Ave., NE. 41°58′58″N 91°39′52″W	Cedar Rapids	Also known as Scottish Rite Temple
32	Cornell College-Mount Vernon Historic District	Cornell College-Mount Vernon Historic District	July 18, 1980 (#80001456)	Roughly bounded by railroad tracks, College Boulevard, N. 10th, N. 8th, and S. 3rd Aves., and N. 2nd and S. 4th Sts. 41°55′34″N 91°25′29″W	Mount Vernon	
33	William and Sue Damour House	William and Sue Damour House	January 16, 1997 (#96001586)	1844 2nd Ave., SE. 41°59′30″N 91°38′38″W	Cedar Rapids	
34	Dewitt-Harman Archeological Site		September 14, 2000 (#00001077)	Address Restricted	Cedar Rapids	
35	George B. Douglas House	George B. Douglas House	September 9, 1982 (#82002628)	800 2nd Ave., SE. 41°58′56″N 91°39′39″W	Cedar Rapids	
36	Dows Street Historic District	Dows Street Historic District	November 14, 2003 (#02001026)	Dows St. between State and Main Sts. 41°52′23″N 91°35′10″W	Ely	
37	William and Phebe C. Dunn House	William and Phebe C. Dunn House	September 4, 2013 (#13000663)	524 10th St. 42°01′54″N 91°35′58″W	Marion	
38	Ely School House	Ely School House	September 20, 2006 (#06000859)	1570 Rowley St. 41°52′17″N 91°35′05″W	Ely	
39	Evans Manufacturing Company Building	Evans Manufacturing Company Building	April 15, 1999 (#99000450)	301 6th Ave., SE. 41°58′32″N 91°39′46″W	Cedar Rapids	
40	First Avenue Bridge	First Avenue Bridge	May 15, 1998 (#98000530)	U.S. Route 151 over the Cedar River; 41°58′36″N 91°40′20″W	Cedar Rapids	
41	First Church of Christ, Scientist	First Church of Christ, Scientist	October 10, 2017 (#100001698)	1246 2nd Ave. SE. 41°59′05″N 91°39′20″W	Cedar Rapids	
42	First Presbyterian Church of Marion, Iowa	First Presbyterian Church of Marion, Iowa	July 24, 1992 (#92000924)	802 12th St. 42°02′04″N 91°35′50″W	Marion	
43	First Universalist Church of Cedar Rapids	First Universalist Church of Cedar Rapids	August 24, 1978 (#78001239)	600 3rd Ave., SE. 41°58′48″N 91°39′44″W	Cedar Rapids	Demolished in 2011.
44	Granger House	Granger House	August 13, 1976 (#76000781)	970 10th St. 42°02′09″N 91°35′59″W	Marion	
45	Grant Vocational High School	Grant Vocational High School	October 13, 2015 (#15000728)	346 2nd Ave., SW. 41°58′27″N 91°40′38″W	Cedar Rapids	
46	Grant Wood's "Fall Plowing" Rural Historic Landscape District	Grant Wood's "Fall Plowing" Rural Historic Landscape District	May 30, 2003 (#03000476)	0.5 miles (0.80 km) north of the junction of Matsell Ln. and Stone City Rd. 42°06′55″N 91°23′20″W	Viola	
47	Douglas and Charlotte Grant House	Douglas and Charlotte Grant House	November 9, 1988 (#88002145)	3400 Adel St., SE. 42°00′42″N 91°37′20″W	Marion	
48	Hamilton Brothers Building	Hamilton Brothers Building	September 8, 1994 (#94001098)	401 1st St., SE. 41°58′30″N 91°40′02″W	Cedar Rapids	
49	Harper and McIntire Company Warehouse	Harper and McIntire Company Warehouse	November 2, 2015 (#15000758)	411 6th Ave., SE. 41°58′34″N 91°39′42″W	Cedar Rapids	
50	Dr. Percy and Lileah Harris House		February 4, 2021 (#100006115)	3626 Bever Ave. SE; 41°59′04″N 91°36′56″W	Cedar Rapids	Twentieth Century African American Civil Rights-related Resources in Iowa MPS
51	Hickman-Nietert-Odd Fellows Building		November 3, 2023 (#100009434)	102-106 South Main Ave. 42°08′53″N 91°37′06″W	Alburnett	
52	Highwater Rock	Highwater Rock	November 17, 1977 (#77000535)	Cedar River near 1st Ave. and 1st St., NE. 41°58′43″N 91°40′19″W	Cedar Rapids	
53	Hotel Roosevelt	Hotel Roosevelt	May 1, 1991 (#91000534)	200 1st Ave., NE. 41°58′45″N 91°40′06″W	Cedar Rapids	
54	IANR Railroad Underpass	IANR Railroad Underpass	May 15, 1998 (#98000528)	Ely Rd. 41°56′40″N 91°38′12″W	Cedar Rapids	
55	Indian Creek Bridge	Indian Creek Bridge	May 15, 1998 (#98000514)	Artesian Rd. over Indian Creek; 41°58′02″N 91°34′52″W	Cedar Rapids	
56	Iowa Building	Iowa Building	February 17, 1983 (#83000385)	221 4th Ave., SE. 41°58′36″N 91°39′53″W	Cedar Rapids	
57	Iowa State Highway Commission, District 6 Building	Iowa State Highway Commission, District 6 Building	January 17, 2017 (#100000486)	430 16th Ave., SW. 41°57′44″N 91°40′33″W	Cedar Rapids	
58	Iowa Wind Mill and Pump Company Office and Warehouse	Iowa Wind Mill and Pump Company Office and Warehouse	October 31, 2012 (#12000890)	42 7th Ave., SW. 41°58′19″N 91°40′03″W	Cedar Rapids	
59	Jan F. and Antonie Janko Farmstead District	Jan F. and Antonie Janko Farmstead District	September 14, 2000 (#00001079)	4021 Vista Rd. 41°52′25″N 91°36′18″W	Ely	
60	King Memorial Chapel	King Memorial Chapel	November 7, 1976 (#76000782)	Cornell College campus 41°55′30″N 91°25′25″W	Mount Vernon	
61	Klinsky Farmstead Historic District		January 29, 2025 (#100011413)	1534 Ivanhoe Road; 41°53′08″N 91°30′51″W	Ely vicinity	
62	Adams R., Frederick L. and Martha (Taylor) Knott House	Adams R., Frederick L. and Martha (Taylor) Knott House	August 27, 2020 (#100005488)	417 A Ave. SE; 41°55′09″N 91°25′08″W	Mount Vernon	
63	Samuel M. Lane House	Samuel M. Lane House	September 14, 2002 (#02001014)	1776 8th Ave. 42°02′03″N 91°35′31″W	Marion	
64	Lattner Auditorium Building	Lattner Auditorium Building	February 17, 1983 (#83000386)	217 4th Ave., SE. 41°58′35″N 91°39′55″W	Cedar Rapids	
65	Lesinger Block	Lesinger Block	December 24, 1997 (#97001544)	1317 3rd St., SE. 41°57′46″N 91°39′34″W	Cedar Rapids	
66	Lisbon Main Street Historic District	Lisbon Main Street Historic District	November 1, 2019 (#100004555)	101-145 E. and W. Main St., 102-122 W. Main St. 41°55′17″N 91°23′08″W	Lisbon	
67	Lisbon Methodist Church	Lisbon Methodist Church	January 5, 2016 (#15000952)	200 E. Market St. 41°55′21″N 91°23′00″W	Lisbon	
68	Lustron Home No. 02102	Lustron Home No. 02102	August 25, 2004 (#04000898)	2009 Williams Boulevard, SW. 41°58′15″N 91°42′03″W	Cedar Rapids	
69	Marion Carnegie Public Library	Marion Carnegie Public Library	March 25, 1994 (#94000260)	1298 7th Ave. 42°02′01″N 91°35′45″W	Marion	
70	Marion Commercial Historic District	Marion Commercial Historic District	November 18, 2009 (#09000930)	560-748 10th St., 958-1298 7th Ave., 760-96 11th St., 766-76 13th St., 1108 8th Ave., and 969 6th Ave. 42°02′00″N 91°35′58″W	Marion	
71	Matsell Bridge	Matsell Bridge	May 15, 1998 (#98000534)	Natsell Park Rd. over the Wapsipinicon River; 42°07′49″N 91°23′01″W	Springville	
72	May's Island Historic District	May's Island Historic District	October 19, 1978 (#78001240)	Between 1st and 5th Aves. on May Island; 41°58′54″N 91°40′10″W	Cedar Rapids	
73	James H. and Mayetta (Degrush) McCartney House	James H. and Mayetta (Degrush) McCartney House	August 27, 2020 (#100005498)	214 2nd St. SE; 41°55′14″N 91°24′59″W	Mount Vernon	
74	Joseph P. Mentzer House	Joseph P. Mentzer House	April 12, 1982 (#82002629)	2233 3rd Ave. 42°01′49″N 91°35′26″W	Marion	
75	Meyers Farmstead Historic District		February 22, 2021 (#100006183)	300 West Market St. 41°55′23″N 91°23′24″W	Lisbon	
76	Josias L. and Elizabeth A. Minor Farmstead District	Josias L. and Elizabeth A. Minor Farmstead District	September 14, 2000 (#00001080)	7500 Ely Rd. 41°54′19″N 91°36′51″W	Ely	
77	Monroe Elementary School Historic District	Monroe Elementary School Historic District	October 23, 2015 (#15000751)	3200 Pioneer Ave., SE. 41°58′11″N 91°37′12″W	Cedar Rapids	
78	Joseph and Clara Amanda H. Moorhead House	Joseph and Clara Amanda H. Moorhead House	September 14, 2000 (#00001081)	88 Palisades Access Rd. 41°51′59″N 91°32′08″W	Ely	
79	Moslem Temple	Moslem Temple	May 15, 1996 (#96000516)	1335 9th St., NW. 41°59′11″N 91°41′02″W	Cedar Rapids	
78	Mount Vernon Commercial Historic District	Mount Vernon Commercial Historic District	September 13, 1993 (#93000898)	1st St. between 2nd and 1st Aves., N. 41°55′20″N 91°25′01″W	Mount Vernon	
81	Notbohm Mill Archaeological District		March 29, 2000 (#99001383)	Address Restricted	Alburnett	
82	Oak Hill Cemetery Historic District	Oak Hill Cemetery Historic District	May 8, 2013 (#13000243)	Roughly bounded by Mt. Vernon Rd., SE., 15th St., SE., S.& E. lot lines 41°58′33″N 91°38′45″W	Cedar Rapids	
83	Odd Fellows Hall	Odd Fellows Hall	October 10, 1985 (#85003008)	Troy Mills Rd. 42°17′20″N 91°40′57″W	Troy Mills	
84	Our Mother of Sorrows Grotto Historic District	Our Mother of Sorrows Grotto Historic District	January 21, 2015 (#14000213)	1330 Elmhurst Dr., NE. (on the Mount Mercy University campus); 42°00′10″N 91°39′12″W	Cedar Rapids	
85	Paramount Theater Building	Paramount Theater Building	August 26, 1976 (#76000778)	121-127 3rd Ave., SE. 41°58′36″N 91°40′00″W	Cedar Rapids	
86	Dr. Luther L. and Susette E. (Baker) Pease House	Dr. Luther L. and Susette E. (Baker) Pease House	August 27, 2020 (#100005491)	600 1st Ave. South; 41°55′05″N 91°25′13″W	Mount Vernon	
87	People's Savings Bank	People's Savings Bank	March 29, 1978 (#78001241)	101 3rd Ave., SW. 41°58′28″N 91°40′18″W	Cedar Rapids	
88	Charles W. and Nellie Perkins House	Charles W. and Nellie Perkins House	May 9, 2002 (#02000456)	1228 3rd Ave., SE. 41°59′02″N 91°39′18″W	Cedar Rapids	
89	Podhajsky-Jansa Farmstead District	Podhajsky-Jansa Farmstead District	September 14, 2000 (#00001082)	Hoosier Creek Rd. 41°51′41″N 91°36′30″W	Ely	
90	Pucker Street Historic District	Pucker Street Historic District	September 14, 2002 (#02001013)	Bounded by 13th St., 9th Ave., 20th St., and 8th Ave. 42°02′03″N 91°35′34″W	Marion	
91	Glenn O. and Lucy O. Pyle House	Glenn O. and Lucy O. Pyle House	September 14, 2002 (#02001016)	1540 8th Ave. 42°02′03″N 91°35′35″W	Marion	
92	Redmond Park-Grande Avenue Historic District	Redmond Park-Grande Avenue Historic District	September 10, 2001 (#01000994)	Roughly bounded by U.S. Route 151, 19th St., and Washington Ave. 41°59′16″N 91°38′42″W	Cedar Rapids	
93	George W. and Mary J. (Maxwell) Robinson House	George W. and Mary J. (Maxwell) Robinson House	August 27, 2020 (#100005494)	514 1st St. SE; 41°55′12″N 91°24′45″W	Mount Vernon	
94	St. James United Methodist Church	St. James United Methodist Church	December 15, 2015 (#15000894)	1430 Ellis Blvd., NW; 41°59′15″N 91°40′57″W	Cedar Rapids	
95	St. Paul Methodist Episcopal Church	St. Paul Methodist Episcopal Church	June 27, 1985 (#85001376)	1340 3rd Ave., SE; 41°59′08″N 91°39′10″W	Cedar Rapids	
96	Second and Third Avenue Historic District	Second and Third Avenue Historic District	August 10, 2000 (#00000926)	1400 to 1800 blocks of 2nd Ave., SE. and 3rd Ave., SE. 41°59′14″N 91°38′12″W	Cedar Rapids	
97	Security Building	Security Building	December 7, 1977 (#77000536)	2nd Ave. and 2nd St., SE; 41°58′40″N 91°40′03″W	Cedar Rapids	
98	Seminole Valley Farmstead	Seminole Valley Farmstead	October 8, 1976 (#76000779)	West of Cedar Rapids; 42°00′13″N 91°43′38″W	Cedar Rapids	
99	Martin L. and Mary Jane (Yount) Shantz House	Martin L. and Mary Jane (Yount) Shantz House	August 27, 2020 (#100005499)	303 A Ave. SE; 41°55′13″N 91°25′04″W	Mount Vernon	
100	Shores-Mueller Company	Shores-Mueller Company	June 22, 2020 (#100005298)	700 16th St. NE; 41°59′42″N 91°39′19″W	Cedar Rapids	
101	Sinclair Building-Smulekoffs Furniture Store	Sinclair Building-Smulekoffs Furniture Store	2016-05-Shores-Mueller Company03 (#16000214)	97 3rd Ave., SE; 41°58′34″N 91°40′05″W	Cedar Rapids	
102	T.M. Sinclair Mansion	T.M. Sinclair Mansion	December 12, 1976 (#76000780)	2160 Linden Dr., SE; 41°59′31″N 91°38′19″W	Cedar Rapids	
103	James J. and Anna J. (Linean) Smith House #1	James J. and Anna J. (Linean) Smith House #1	August 27, 2020 (#100005496)	316 3rd Ave. SW; 41°55′16″N 91°25′15″W	Mount Vernon	
104	James J. and Anna J. (Linean) Smith House #2	James J. and Anna J. (Linean) Smith House #2	August 27, 2020 (#100005497)	201 2nd Ave. NW; 41°55′26″N 91°25′03″W	Mount Vernon	
105	Sokol Gymnasium	Sokol Gymnasium	May 14, 2013 (#13000274)	417 3rd St., SE; 41°58′34″N 91°39′53″W	Cedar Rapids	
106	Harrison Stuckslager House	Harrison Stuckslager House	October 1, 1979 (#79000910)	207 N. Jackson St. 41°55′25″N 91°23′05″W	Lisbon	
107	Sumner School	Sumner School	May 8, 2013 (#13000242)	877 W. Mount Vernon Rd. 41°56′32″N 91°27′05″W	Mount Vernon vicinity	
108	Taylor-Van Note	Taylor-Van Note	October 10, 1985 (#85003009)	4600 Blairs Ferry Rd. 42°02′31″N 91°43′42″W	Cedar Rapids	
109	Terrace Park Historic District	Terrace Park Historic District	October 25, 2006 (#06000953)	Roughly bounded by 10th Ave., 9th Ave., 11th St., and the eastern side of 12th St. 42°02′15″N 91°35′50″W	Marion	
110	Torrance House	Torrance House	July 7, 1983 (#83000387)	South of Lisbon; 41°53′44″N 91°23′48″W	Lisbon	
111	Upper Paris Bridge	Upper Paris Bridge	May 15, 1998 (#98000532)	Sutton Rd. over the Wapsipinicon River; 42°14′40″N 91°35′04″W	Coggon	
112	WCF & N Center Point Depot and Substation	WCF & N Center Point Depot and Substation	March 7, 2018 (#100002185)	700 Washington St. 42°11′35″N 91°46′53″W	Center Point	
113	Elijah D. and Mary J. (Adams) Waln House	Elijah D. and Mary J. (Adams) Waln House	August 27, 2020 (#100005492)	323 3rd St. NE; 41°55′22″N 91°24′44″W	Mount Vernon	
114	Wesley West House	Wesley West House	June 27, 1985 (#85001380)	Palisades Rd. 41°55′04″N 91°25′43″W	Mount Vernon	
115	West Side Third Avenue SW Commercial Historic District	West Side Third Avenue SW Commercial Historic District	June 13, 2014 (#14000323)	3rd Avenue SW, between 1st and 3rd streets SW; 41°58′27″N 91°40′24″W	Cedar Rapids	
116	Whittier Friends Meeting House	Whittier Friends Meeting House	July 29, 1993 (#93000653)	Junction of County Roads E34 and X20; 42°05′35″N 91°27′50″W	Whittier	
117	Wickiup Hill Late Woodland Village Site		January 20, 2022 (#100007333)	Address Restricted	Toddville vicinity	Archaeology of the Wickiup Hill Locality in Linn County, Iowa MPS
118	Wickiup Hill Middle to Late Archaic Camp Site		January 20, 2022 (#100007334)	Address Restricted	Toddville vicinity	Archaeology of the Wickiup Hill Locality in Linn County, Iowa MPS
119	Wickiup Hill Mound Group No. 1		January 20, 2022 (#100007335)	Address Restricted	Toddville vicinity	Archaeology of the Wickiup Hill Locality in Linn County, Iowa MPS
120	Wickiup Hill Mound Group No. 2		January 20, 2022 (#100007336)	Address Restricted	Toddville vicinity	Archaeology of the Wickiup Hill Locality in Linn County, Iowa MPS
121	Wickiup Hill Mound Group No. 3		January 20, 2022 (#100007337)	Address Restricted	Toddville vicinity	Archaeology of the Wickiup Hill Locality in Linn County, Iowa MPS
122	Wickiup Hill Mound Group No. 4		January 20, 2022 (#100007338)	Address Restricted	Toddville vicinity	Archaeology of the Wickiup Hill Locality in Linn County, Iowa MPS
123	Col. John Q. and Rowena (Camp) Wilds House	Col. John Q. and Rowena (Camp) Wilds House	August 27, 2020 (#100005490)	113 2nd Ave. NW; 41°55′24″N 91°25′04″W	Mount Vernon	
124	Witwer Grocery Company Building	Witwer Grocery Company Building	May 1, 1998 (#98000386)	905 3rd St., SE. 41°58′21″N 91°39′38″W	Cedar Rapids	
125	Philip A. Wolff House and Carriage House	Philip A. Wolff House and Carriage House	October 7, 1982 (#82000414)	1420 Seminole Ave., NW. 41°58′43″N 91°41′30″W	Cedar Rapids	Restored property now Belmont Hill Victorian Bed & Breakfast

== Former listings ==
	Name on the Register	Image	Date listed	Date removed	Location	City or town	Description
1	Bertram Bridge	Bertram Bridge	May 15, 1998 (#98000531)	December 8, 2014	Ely St. over Big Creek; 41°57′23″N 91°31′36″W	Bertram	Destroyed by flooding, June 29, 2014
2	Luther A. and Elinore T. Brewer House	Luther A. and Elinore T. Brewer House	April 23, 1998 (#98000383)	April 3, 2014	847 4th Ave., SE. 41°58′27″N 91°39′22″W	Cedar Rapids	Delisted after being relocated on April 3, 2014
3	Henek and Mary Horecky Log Cabin		September 14, 2000 (#00001078)	July 21, 2015	Address Restricted	Mount Vernon vicinity	Delisted after being relocated in 2015
4	Indian Creek Bridge II		May 15, 1998 (#98000515)	March 11, 1999	Artesian Rd. over Indian Creek	Cedar Rapids	Collapsed on October 24, 1998
5	Mittvatsky House		September 5, 1975 (#75000695)	October 24, 2007	1035 2nd St., SE	Cedar Rapids	

== See also ==
- List of National Historic Landmarks in Iowa
- National Register of Historic Places listings in Iowa
- Listings in neighboring counties: Benton, Buchanan, Cedar, Delaware, Iowa, Johnson, Jones
