= Philip Wolfe =

Philip Wolfe, and similar variations, may refer to:

- Philip Wolfe (mathematician) (1927–2016), American mathematician
- Philip Wolfe (engineer) (born 1950), British renewable energy specialist
- Philip C. Wolf (1956–2021), American entrepreneur and executive
- Philipp Wolf (born 1992), German Olympic swimmer

== See also ==
- Philip A. Wolff House and Carriage House
- Philipp Wolfgang, Count of Hanau-Lichtenberg
- Philipp Wolfrum
