= Beach School (Mount Vernon, Iowa) =

- U.S. National Register of Historic Places
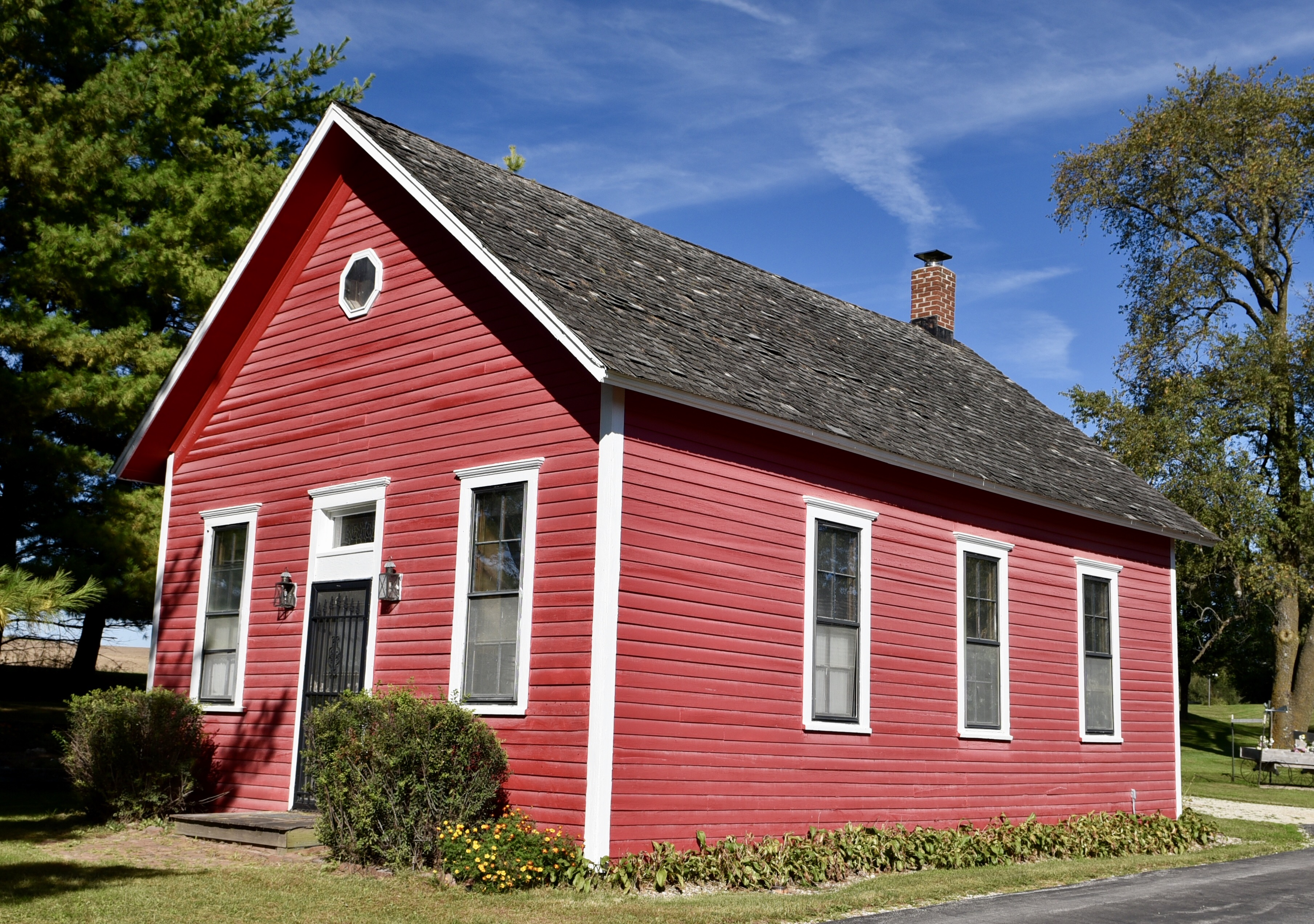

- Location within Iowa Location within the United States
- Location: Northwest of Mount Vernon off U.S. Route 30
- Coordinates: 41°59′27.7″N 91°28′38.8″W
- Area: about 1 acre (0.40 ha)
- Built: 1892
- Built by: Unknown
- NRHP reference No.: 82002630
- Added to NRHP: September 16, 1982

Beach School is a historic building located northwest of Mount Vernon, Iowa, United States. Because school district lines had been redrawn, students in this area were forced to attend classes in a building some distance away. Given the condition of rural roads in the late 19th century, that created a hardship for many families. From 1889 to 1891 the school district set aside funds for a new building, and Benjamin Beach donated land on his farm for the new school. Not only was his farmhouse nearby, but Beach also operated a sawmill along the creek east of the school and a gristmill across the road. The one-room schoolhouse was completed in 1892, and a bell was purchased for the building around 1901. Early drawings of the building show a small bell tower. The building was used for educational and social use until 1946, and it has subsequently been converted into a rental home. It was listed on the National Register of Historic Places in 1982.
