= Josias L. and Elizabeth A. Minor Farmstead District =

Historic district in Iowa, United States

- U.S. National Register of Historic Places
- U.S. Historic district
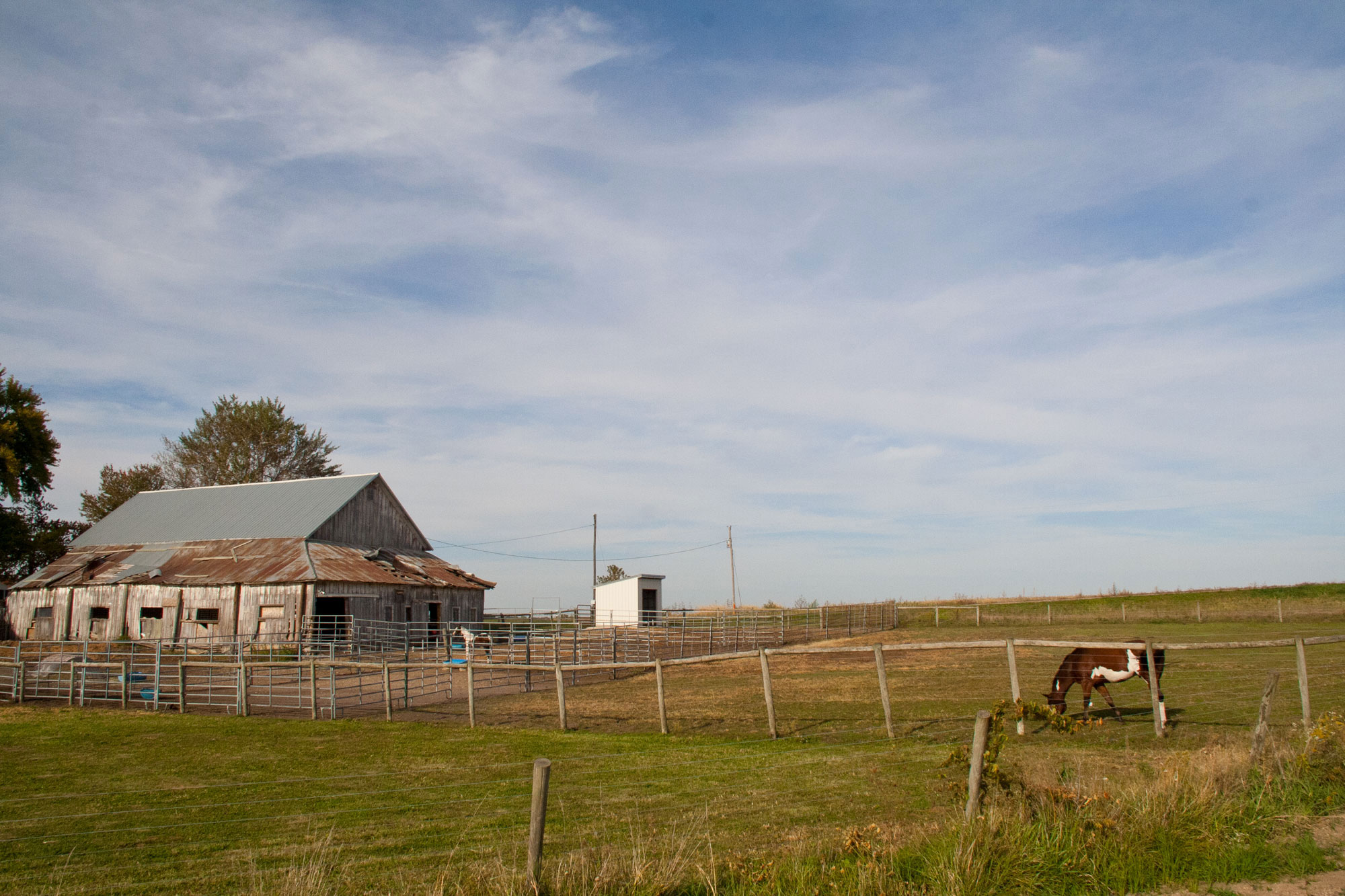

- Location within Iowa Location within the United States
- Location: 7500 Ely Rd. Ely, Iowa
- Coordinates: 41°54′18.5″N 91°36′51.8″W
- Area: 1 acre (0.40 ha)
- Built: 1855, 1856
- MPS: Early Settlement and Ethnic Properties of Linn County, Iowa MPS
- NRHP reference No.: 00001080
- Added to NRHP: September 14, 2000

The Josias L. and Elizabeth A. Minor Farmstead District is an agricultural historic district located northwest of Ely, Iowa, United States. It was listed on the National Register of Historic Places in 2000. At the time of its nomination it consisted of five resources, which included four contributing buildings and one non-contributing structure. The historic buildings include a 1 1/2-story, T-plan, half-timbered house (1856); gabled barn #1 (c. 1855); gabled barn #2 (1850s-1860s, with an addition from the 1860s-1870s); and the summer kitchen (1850s). The corncrib (1910s or 1920s) is the historic structure. Family lore says that Josias Minor settled here in 1846, but an 1878 biography of him gives September 1855 as the settlement date, which is used here for dating the buildings.

The farm has always been in the Minor family, who settled here from Pennsylvania. This is a rare example of an early settlement farmstead, and it is the only one in Linn County with its original primary buildings still standing in good condition. By the early 20th century this farm was part of a cluster of Minor family farms, which reflected the pattern of family-oriented settlements in the county during this era.
