= Charles W. and Nellie Perkins House =

Historic house in Iowa, United States

- U.S. National Register of Historic Places
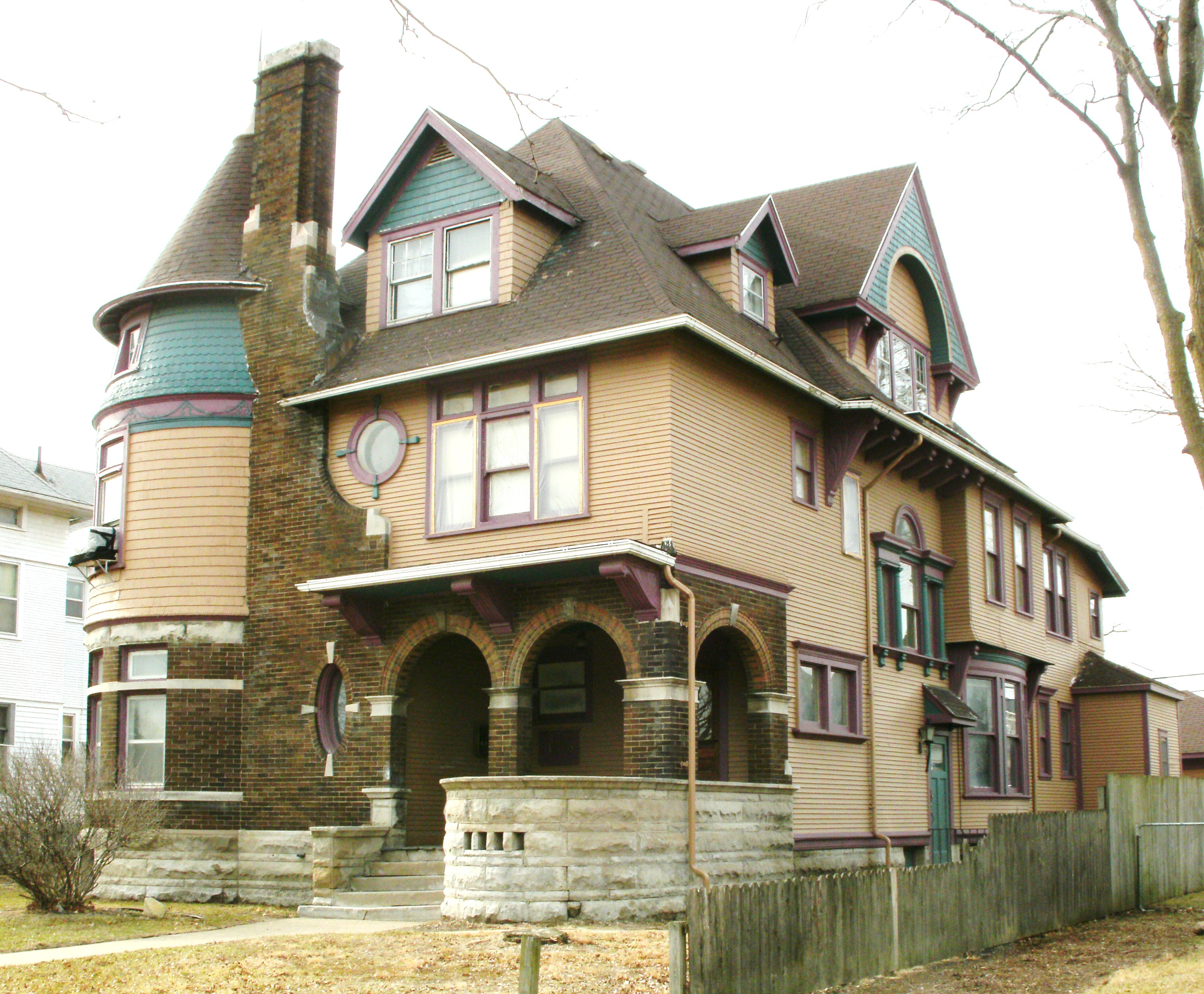

- Location within Iowa Location within the United States
- Location: 1228 3rd Ave., SE; Cedar Rapids, Iowa
- Coordinates: 41°59′02.2″N 91°39′19.7″W
- Area: less than one acre
- Built: 1897
- Architect: Charles A. Dieman
- Architectural style: Queen Anne
- NRHP reference No.: 02000456
- Added to NRHP: May 9, 2002

The Charles W. and Nellie Perkins House is a historic building located in Cedar Rapids, Iowa, United States. This 2½-story, wood-frame, Queen Anne was designed by local architect Charles A. Dieman. Dieman himself lived in the same middle and upper-class neighborhood. The house was completed in 1897 for Charles Perkins, who had worked as a cashier in a couple of life insurance companies. By 1928 the house had been converted into an eight-plex. Prominent features include the 2½-story corner tower with a conical roof, the large brick chimney on the main facade, the front porch with round-arched brick columns, the hip roof with dormers of various sizes, the bracketed eaves, the Palladian window and bay window on the east elevation, as well as the oval and rectangular window openings. The house was listed on the National Register of Historic Places in 2002.
