= Witwer Grocery Company Building =

- U.S. National Register of Historic Places
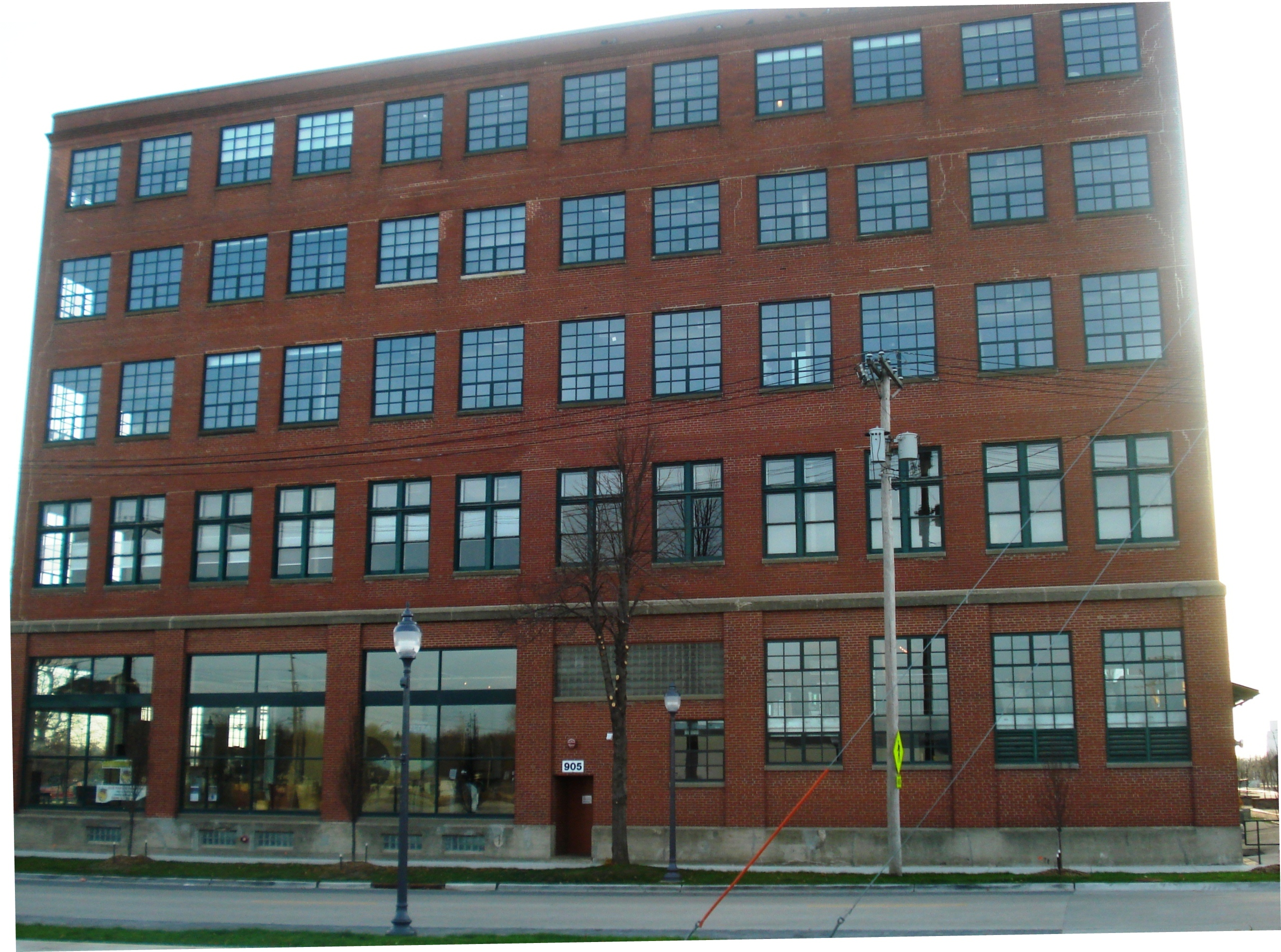

- Location within Iowa Location within the United States
- Location: 905 3rd St., SE; Cedar Rapids, Iowa
- Coordinates: 41°58′21″N 91°39′38″W
- Area: less than one acre
- Built: 1946
- Architect: Blahnik & Berger
- MPS: Commercial & Industrial Development of Cedar Rapids MPS
- NRHP reference No.: 98000386
- Added to NRHP: May 1, 1998

The Witwer Grocery Company Building, also known as the Osada Building or more recently as the Bottleworks Loft Condominiums, is a historic structure located in Cedar Rapids, Iowa, United States. The building served as the grocery warehouse for the Witwer Grocery Company, a local Cedar Rapids grocer which included MeToo stores from 1946 to 1965 and had a bottling facility for Life Cola and Hires Root Beer on the first floor. The building is five stories tall and rises 55 feet (17 m) above the ground. It was designed by the architectural firm of Blahnik & Berger and was completed in 1946. The building was extensively renovated from 1996 to 1997 into apartments. A full height atrium was created in the buildings core. It was listed on the National Register of Historic Places in 1998, and is part of the Commercial & Industrial Development of Cedar Rapids MPS. The Osada complex closed in 2007 and was remodeled into Bottleworks Loft Condominiums post-2008 flood.
