= Highwater Rock =

- U.S. National Register of Historic Places
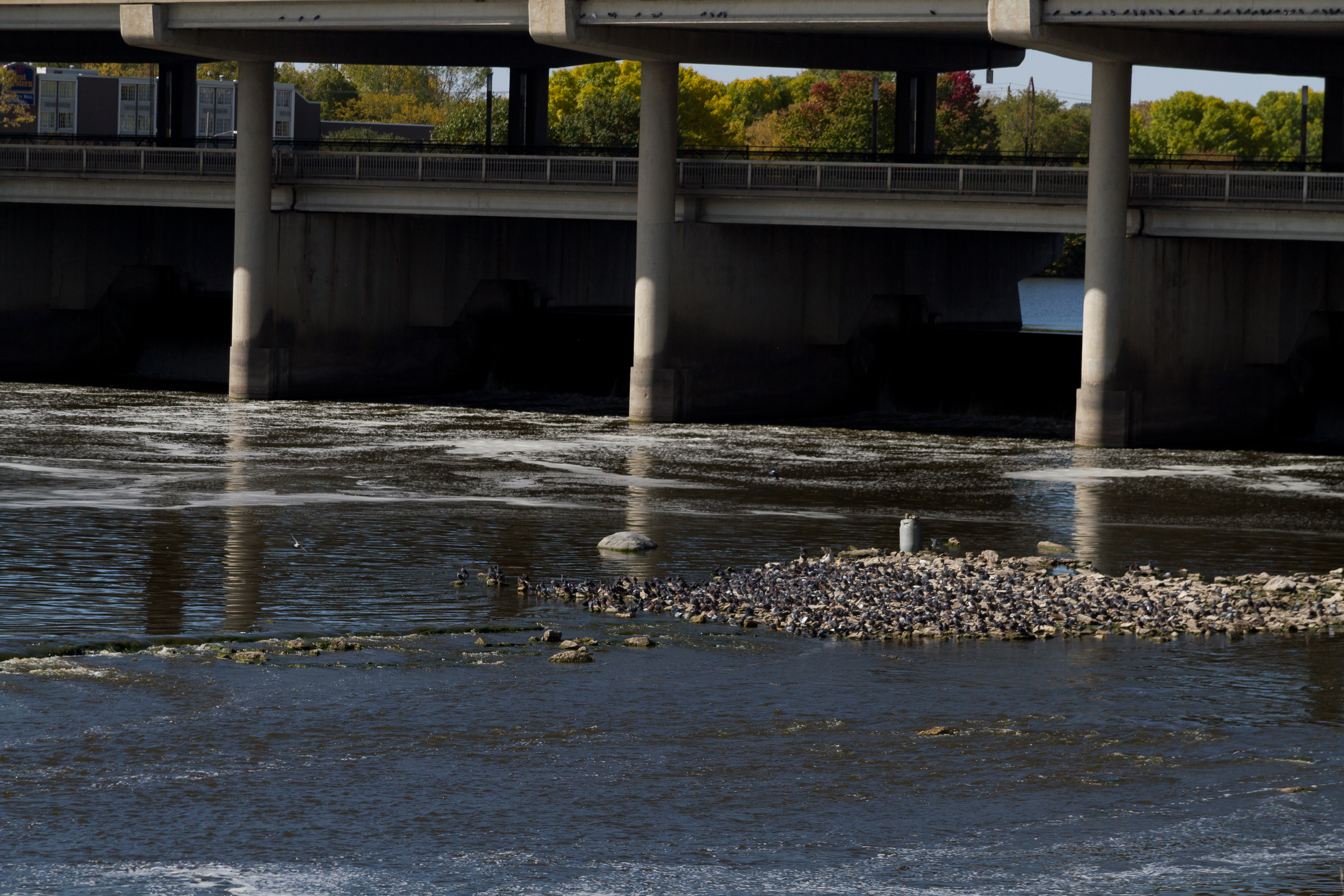
- The Highwater Rock is mostly submerged in the center of the photo.

- Location within Iowa Location within the United States
- Location: Cedar River near 1st Ave. and 1st St., NE. Cedar Rapids, Iowa
- Coordinates: 41°58′43″N 91°40′19″W
- Area: less than one acre
- NRHP reference No.: 77000535
- Added to NRHP: November 17, 1977

The Highwater Rock is located in the Cedar River near downtown Cedar Rapids, Iowa, United States. It is a large granite boulder in the rapids in the eastern half of the river. Its height depends on the river level. It can be 3 feet (0.91 m) to 4 feet (1.2 m) above the water level in low water, or submerged in high water. It was used to gauge the river depth from the 1840s to the close of river navigation in the mid-1860s. In the early days, people could cross the river at the rapids on horseback, on foot, or by wagon and buggy. They would use the rock to determine if it was safe for them to cross. After David W. King began ferry service in 1848 and a toll bridge was built, people would use the rock to determine if the water was low enough to cross the river and avoid paying the tolls. King would use the rock to determine the amount of cargo he could carry or if he could run the ferry at all. After steam navigation was established on the river the steamer pilots would use the rock to determine if they could continue past the rapids. Railroads severely curtailed the use of steamboats on the Cedar River, and in 1870 the United States Congress declared the river was not navigable above Columbus Junction, which is well below Cedar Rapids. This put an end to water transportation on this part of the river, and the usefulness of the rock. It was listed on the National Register of Historic Places in 1977.
