= Seminole Valley Farmstead =

- U.S. National Register of Historic Places
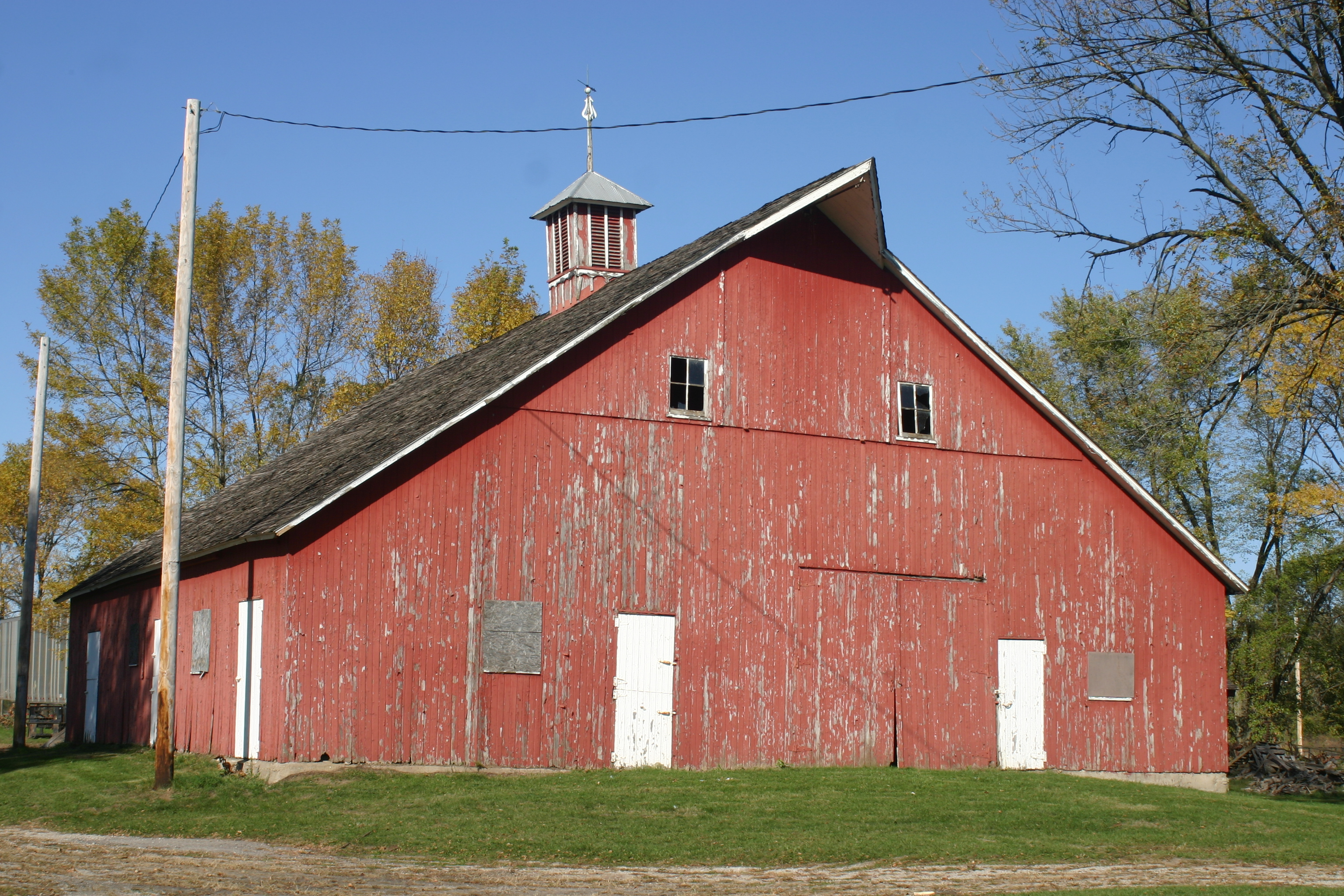
- Livestock barn

- Location within Iowa Location within the United States
- Location: West of Cedar Rapids
- Coordinates: 42°0′13″N 91°43′38″W
- Area: less than one acre
- Built: 1902-1903
- Built by: Unknown
- NRHP reference No.: 76000779
- Added to NRHP: October 8, 1976

Seminole Valley Farmstead is a collection of historic farm buildings located in Seminole Valley Park on the north east side of Cedar Rapids, Iowa, United States. The historic designation includes the farmhouse (c. 1902–1903), summer kitchen, livestock barn, tool shed, ice house, chicken house, and smokehouse. There is also a small orchard and a garden. The complex is located near a bend in the Cedar River. The farm represents a transitional period between Iowa's austere pioneer farms and the mechanized farms that developed later in the 20th century. The nearby timber was a source of raw materials for the farm, the fertile bottomland on which it is located provided rich soil for grazing and cultivation, and the smokehouse and ice house were used to preserve agricultural products for later consumption. At the same time the barn and the chicken house were more substantial than those from earlier times. It was listed on the National Register of Historic Places in 1976.
