= Braska House =

Historic house in Iowa, United States

- U.S. National Register of Historic Places
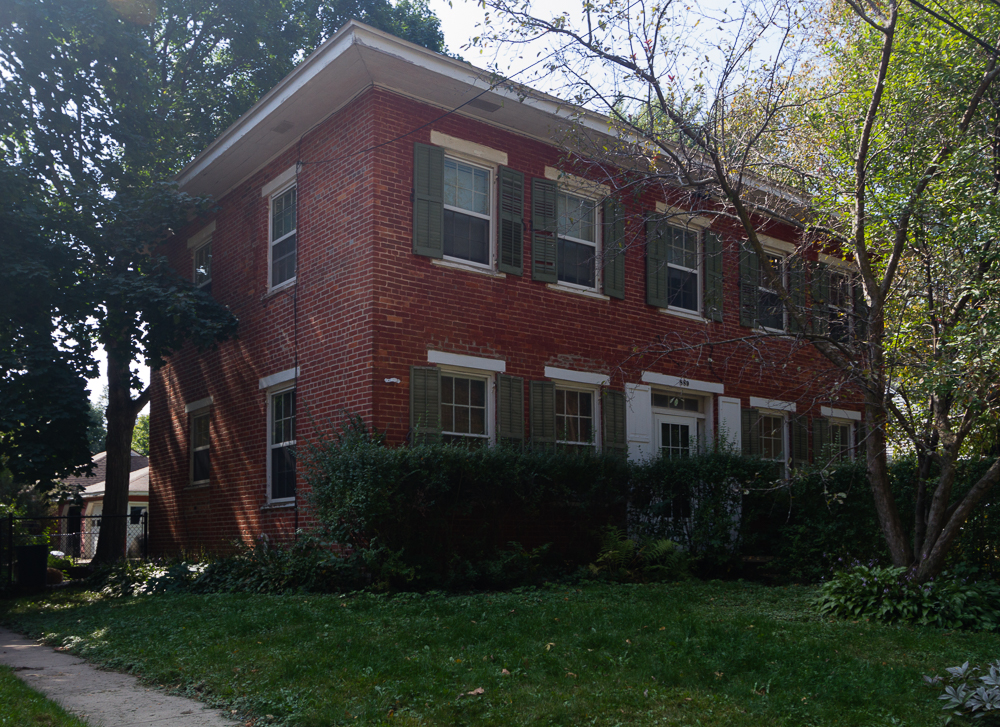

- Location within Iowa Location within the United States
- Location: 889 2nd Ave. Marion, Iowa
- Coordinates: 42°01′43.8″N 91°36′02.6″W
- Area: less than one acre
- Built: 1855
- Architectural style: Greek Revival; Italianate
- NRHP reference No.: 79000911
- Added to NRHP: March 21, 1979

The Braska House is a historic building located in Marion, Iowa, United States. This is a vernacular house form that utilizes elements from the Greek Revival and Italianate styles. Similar houses from the same period are found in Muscatine, Iowa, and the Joseph Smith Mansion House in Nauvoo, Illinois is a more elaborate example. The Greek Revival elements are found in the symmetrical main facade, the straight forward lines, and the lack of embellishments. The Italianate is found in the low-pitched hipped roof and the wide eaves. The house was listed on the National Register of Historic Places in 1979.
