= Evans Manufacturing Company Building =

- U.S. National Register of Historic Places
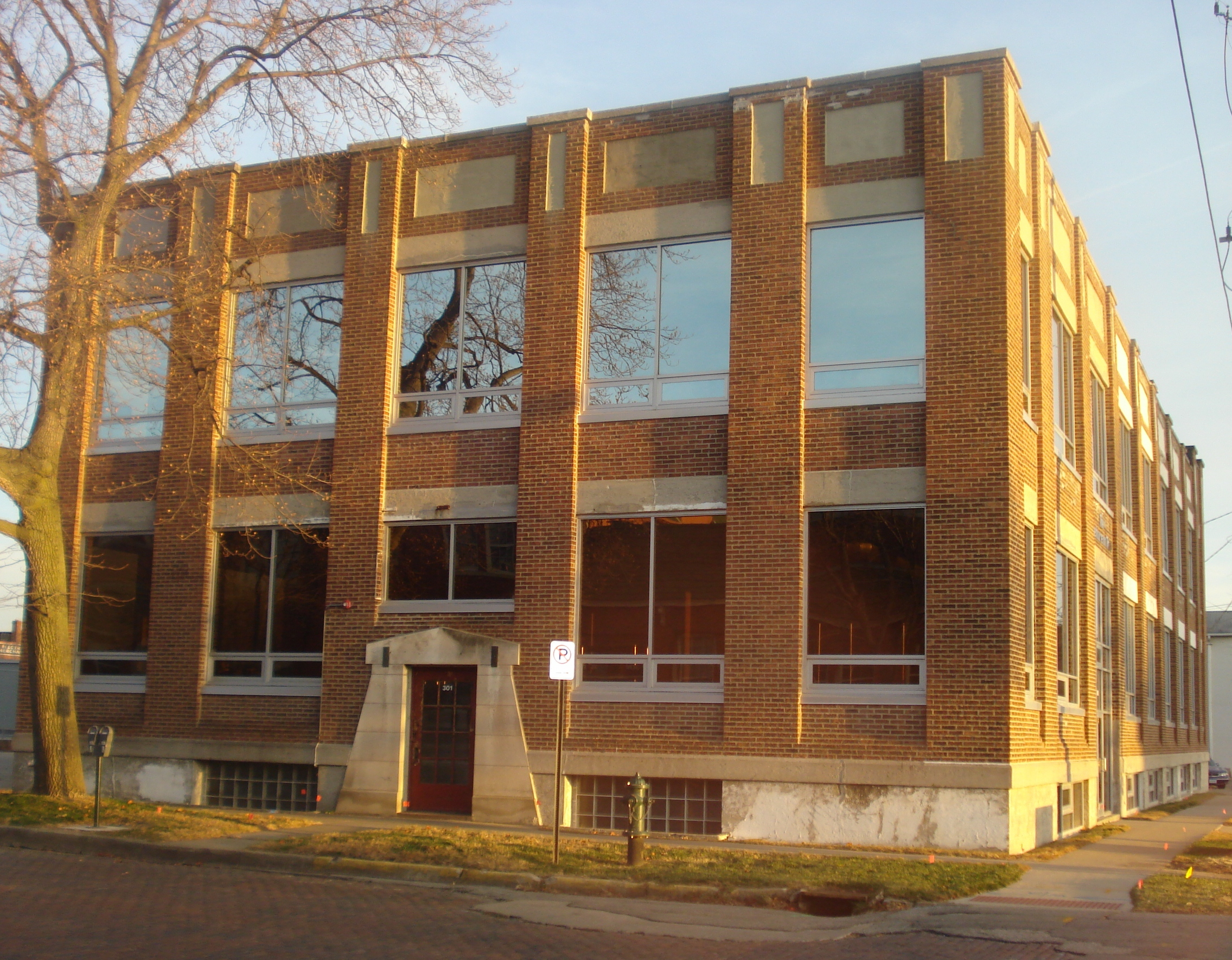

- Location within Iowa Location within the United States
- Location: 301 6th Ave., SE; Cedar Rapids, Iowa
- Coordinates: 41°58′30.2″N 91°39′46.2″W
- Area: less than one acre
- Built: 1919
- Architectural style: Modern Movement
- MPS: Commercial & Industrial Development of Cedar Rapids MPS
- NRHP reference No.: 99000450
- Added to NRHP: April 15, 1999

The Evans Manufacturing Company Building, also known as Metropolitan Supply Company Building, is a historic building located in Cedar Rapids, Iowa, United States. The Brown-Evans Manufacturing Company, which made men's work clothing, was relocated from Sedalia, Missouri to Cedar Rapids when this building was completed in 1919. It was built in the 4th Street Railroad Corridor, which had attracted various industrial enterprises in the years before and after World War I. The Modern Movement building was designed according to the principles of industrial design of the time in light of the Triangle Shirtwaist Factory fire in 1911. Its fireproof masonry construction was intended to lessen the risk of fires. Storage of raw stock was located in the basement, cutting and storage of finished stock was located on the first floor, and sewing was done on the second floor and balcony. Its open floor plan allowed for assembly line production.

The company reorganized in 1933 as the Evans Garment Company, and it expanded to producing women's house dresses the following year. As the Great Depression wore on, their market declined and the plant closed three years later. It was replaced by the Metropolitan Supply Company, who moved their printing and school supply operation here in 1936. They moved to a different facility in 1995, and closed a short time later. This building then housed an architectural office, a dance studio, and a warehouse operation. It was listed on the National Register of Historic Places in 1999.
