= Augustus and Elizabeth (Huntsberger) Bauman House =

Historic house in Iowa, United States

- U.S. National Register of Historic Places
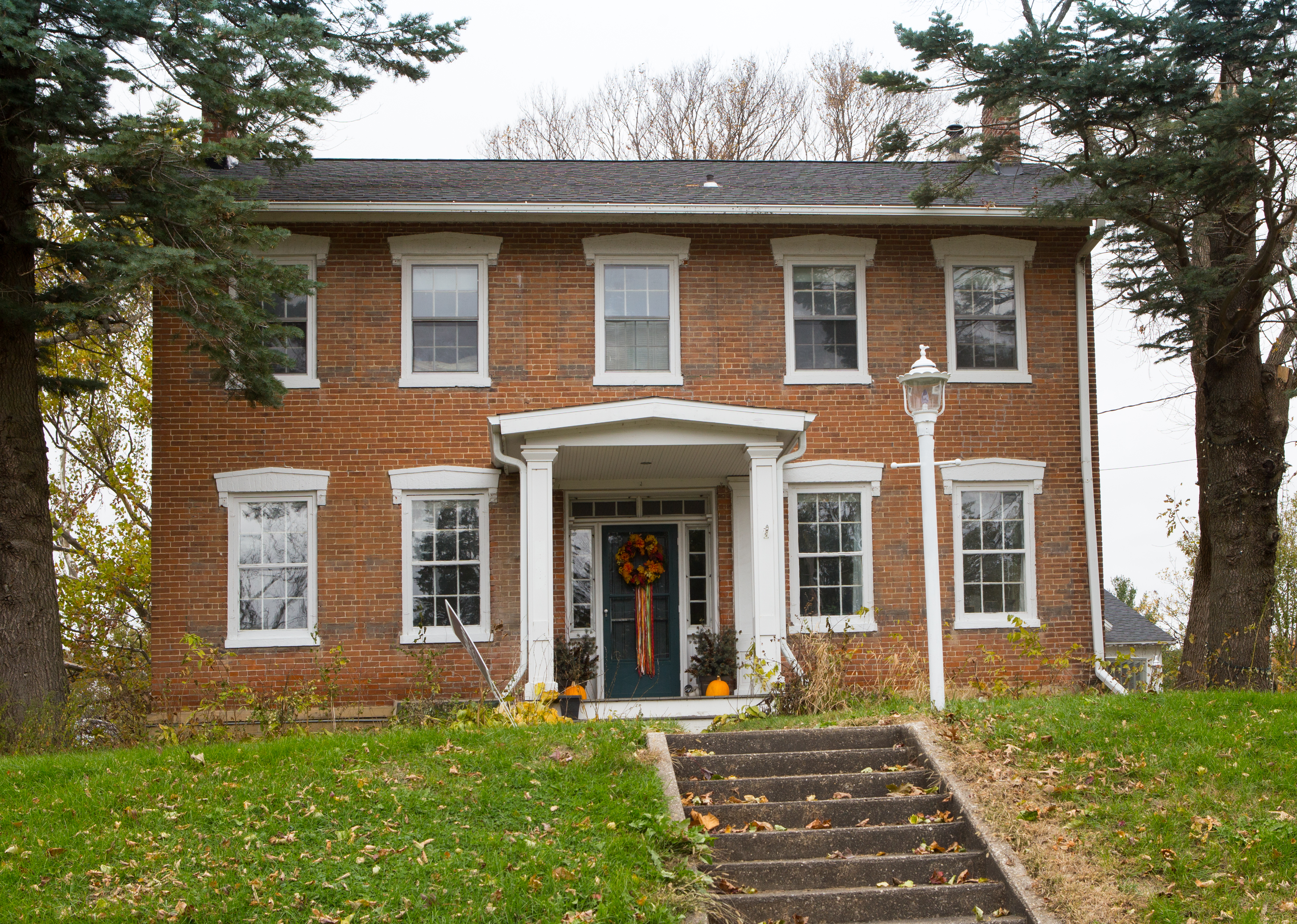

- Location within Iowa Location within the United States
- Location: 601 1st Ave. SW; Mount Vernon, Iowa
- Coordinates: 41°55′06″N 91°25′16″W
- Area: less than one acre
- Built: c.1854
- Built by: Henry D. Albright; William D. Albright
- MPS: Mount Vernon MPS
- NRHP reference No.: 100005489
- Added to NRHP: August 27, 2020; 6 years ago

The Augustus and Elizabeth (Huntsberger) Bauman House, also known as the Platner House and the Camp House, is a historic building located in Mount Vernon, Iowa, United States. It is significant for its association with the settlement of the city that was influenced by the establishment of the Military Road, its use of locally made brick and locally quarried limestone, and its vernacular architectural techniques. The house was built along the Military Road about 1854, which was the year the Bauman's moved to Mount Vernon. It was constructed by brothers Henry and William Albright, who were the town's first masons. The two-story, side-gabled brick house features Early Republic stylistic influences. In 1857, the land on which the house was built was platted as Bauman's Addition, making this house a representative of the town's early development. The house was listed on the National Register of Historic Places in 2020.
