= Meyers Farmstead Historic District =

Historic district in Iowa, United States

- U.S. National Register of Historic Places
- U.S. Historic district
- Location within Iowa Location within the United States
- Location: 300 West Market St. Lisbon, Iowa
- Coordinates: 41°55′22.8″N 91°23′23.8″W
- Area: 1.4 acres (0.57 ha)
- NRHP reference No.: 100006183
- Added to NRHP: February 22, 2021

The Meyers Farmstead Historic District, also known as the Jacob E. and Amanda Meyers Farm and the John B. and Ella Meyers Farm, is an agricultural historic district located in Lisbon, Iowa, United States. It was listed on the National Register of Historic Places in 2021. At the time of its nomination it consisted of six resources, which included two contributing buildings, two contributing structures, and two contributing objects. The historic buildings include a heavy timber frame Pennsylvania banked barn (1870s) and a feeder/hay barn (c. 1908). The historic structures include a combination corn crib/hog house (1880s) and a concrete silo (c. 1910). The contributing objects include a concrete watering trough and water pump and a metal gateway. The farmhouse is also extant but was separated from the rest of the farm buildings when South Jefferson Street was extended in 2002. That separation and the modifications made to it over the years has led to its loss of historical integrity

Henry and Pricilla Meyers moved from Lebanon, Pennsylvania to Ohio, and then on to Lisbon in 1853. Their son Jacob, who was a brick mason, started farming the land adjacent to their home. The farm was incorporated into the city limits in 1877. The farm was owned by members of the Mayers family until 1983. Its significance is attributed to its association with agricultural trends in livestock and dairy farming in the late 19th and early 20th centuries. The creameries in Lisbon likely led to the expansion and modernization of the dairy operation. The hog and cattle operation tied this farmstead to the nearby railroad shipping depot. The buildings and structures are also a result of a 1908 tornado that damaged them or were replacements for those that were destroyed.
