= Bever Woods Historic District =

Historic district in Iowa, United States

- U.S. National Register of Historic Places
- U.S. Historic district
- Location within Iowa Location within the United States
- Location: Grande Ave. SE, 21st St. SE, Bever Ave. SE, Cedar Rapids, Iowa
- Coordinates: 41°59′07″N 91°38′02″W
- NRHP reference No.: 100008668
- Added to NRHP: March 2, 2023

The Bever Woods Historic District is a nationally recognized historic district located in Cedar Rapids, Iowa, United States. It was listed on the National Register of Historic Places in 2023. Sampson Cicero Bever with his wife and children, moved to Cedar Rapids in 1852. He opened the city's first bank and was involved in bringing the first railroad to Cedar Rapids. He also donated the land for Bever Park, which is on the east boundary of the district. The historic district is a residential area made up of about 150 single-family homes. Sampson Bever's grandson James had the area platted in 1916 and developed the homes in the 1920s.
