= Notbohm Mill Archaeological District =

Historic district in Iowa, United States

- U.S. National Register of Historic Places
- U.S. Historic district
- Location: Address restricted
- Nearest city: Alburnett, Iowa
- NRHP reference No.: 99001383
- Added to NRHP: March 29, 2000

Notbohm Mill Archaeological District, designated 13LN296 in the state archaeological inventory, is a nationally recognized historic district located west of Alburnett, Iowa, United States. It includes the remnants of the mill's foundation, the mill race, and the now-dry mill pond along the east branch of Otter Creek. This was both a grist mill and a sawmill operation. The mill began operating in the late 1860s. Frederick Notbohm began building the mill facility, which is the subject of this district, in 1875 near the now-defunct town of Lafayette. It continued to operate into the late 1930s and the mill itself continued to stand into the 1970s when it collapsed. The historic district was listed on the National Register of Historic Places in 2000.
