= Henry D. and Juliana (Wortz) Albright House =

Historic house in Iowa, United States

- U.S. National Register of Historic Places
- Location within Iowa Location within the United States
- Location: 224 1st St. SW; Mount Vernon, Iowa
- Coordinates: 41°55′23″N 91°25′09″W
- Area: less than one acre
- Built: 1853
- Built by: Henry D. Albright; William D. Albright
- MPS: Mount Vernon MPS
- NRHP reference No.: 100005495
- Added to NRHP: August 27, 2020

The Henry D. and Juliana (Wortz) Albright House, also known as the Dr. Francis F. and Jeanette L. Ebersole House, is a historic building located in Mount Vernon, Iowa, United States. This house holds historical significance for several reasons. It is notably associated with the early settlement of Mount Vernon, influenced by the development of the Military Road, and it is recognized as the first brick house constructed in the city. The house exemplifies vernacular architectural techniques and Early Republic stylistic influences.

Henry D. Albright, a carpenter, and his brother William, a mason, moved to Mount Vernon from Iowa City to work on building Cornell College. In 1853, William established a brickyard in the town, using locally sourced materials. He assisted Henry in constructing the brick house, which was completed that same year. Henry, his wife Juliana, and their family were the first residents of the house, which remained in the Albright family until 1926.

In 1926, Dr. F.F. Ebersole acquired the house and renovated it the following year to accommodate his medical practice. The two-story, side-gabled house is built from brick produced at the Albright brickyard and features locally quarried limestone. Its architectural and historical significance led to its listing on the National Register of Historic Places in 2020.
