= Shores-Mueller Company =

- U.S. National Register of Historic Places
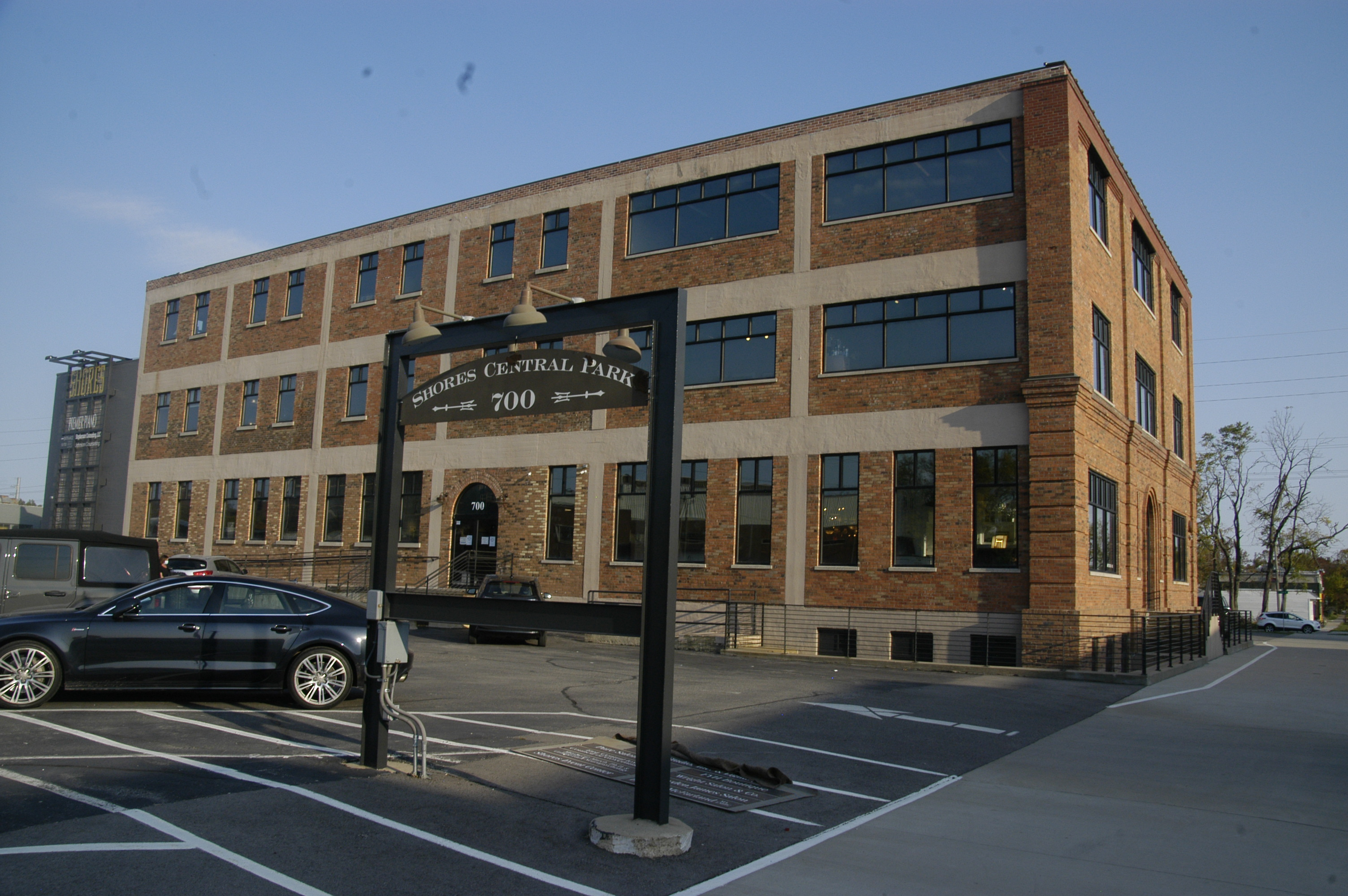

- Location within Iowa Location within the United States
- Location: 700 16th St. NE; Cedar Rapids, Iowa
- Coordinates: 41°58′47.6″N 91°40′51.5″W
- Built: 1911
- NRHP reference No.: 100005298
- Added to NRHP: June 22, 2020

The Shores-Mueller Company is a historic building located in Cedar Rapids, Iowa, United States. The original section of the building was completed in 1911. Its construction utilized the Turner Cap system, which is a concrete flat-slab support system. It features concrete floors that are more than 1 foot (0.30 m) thick and are supported by large concrete columns with concrete caps. The building housed the catalog company Shores-Mueller, which produced, packaged, and sold a variety of household and farm products from here. Two additions were built on to the original structure, the last being in 1969. The building is three-stories, constructed in brick, and lacking in ornamentation. Tom Erger, Devonna Wood, and Mike Pitzen acquired the building in 2005 and renovated it into the Shores Central Park, which hosts a variety of functions. It was listed on the National Register of Historic Places in 2020.
