= Coggon Commercial Historic District =

Historic district in Iowa, United States

- U.S. National Register of Historic Places
- U.S. Historic district
- Location within Iowa Location within the United States
- Location: East Main Street between 1st Street South and 3rd Street North, Coggon, Iowa
- Coordinates: 42°16′51.5″N 91°31′50.4″W
- NRHP reference No.: 100004229
- Added to NRHP: August 7, 2019

The Coggon Commercial Historic District is a nationally recognized historic district located in Coggon, Iowa, United States. It was listed on the National Register of Historic Places in 2019. At the time of its nomination it consisted of 18 contributing buildings. Coggon's development began in the 1880s after arrival of the railroad in town. Main Street was built perpendicular to the train tracks, which was on the west side of the central business district, so that the businesses had easy access. The east side of Main Street terminated at the Coggon Public School. The street was designed to be wider than normal to accommodate pedestrian and buggy traffic and to showcase the school building. All but three of the contributing buildings in the historic district were built between 1887 and 1912. They are one- and two-story brick structures with storefronts on the main floor. Coggon's economy expanded in the early 20th century during a period of agricultural revitalization. Automobiles started to gain prominence toward the end of this period. The town's first gas station opened in 1910. As people drove more they traveled less by train and passenger service was eventually discontinued in Coggon. Freight service, however, still utilizes the tracks on the west side of town.
