= Adams R., Frederick L. and Martha (Taylor) Knott House =

Historic house in Iowa, United States

- U.S. National Register of Historic Places
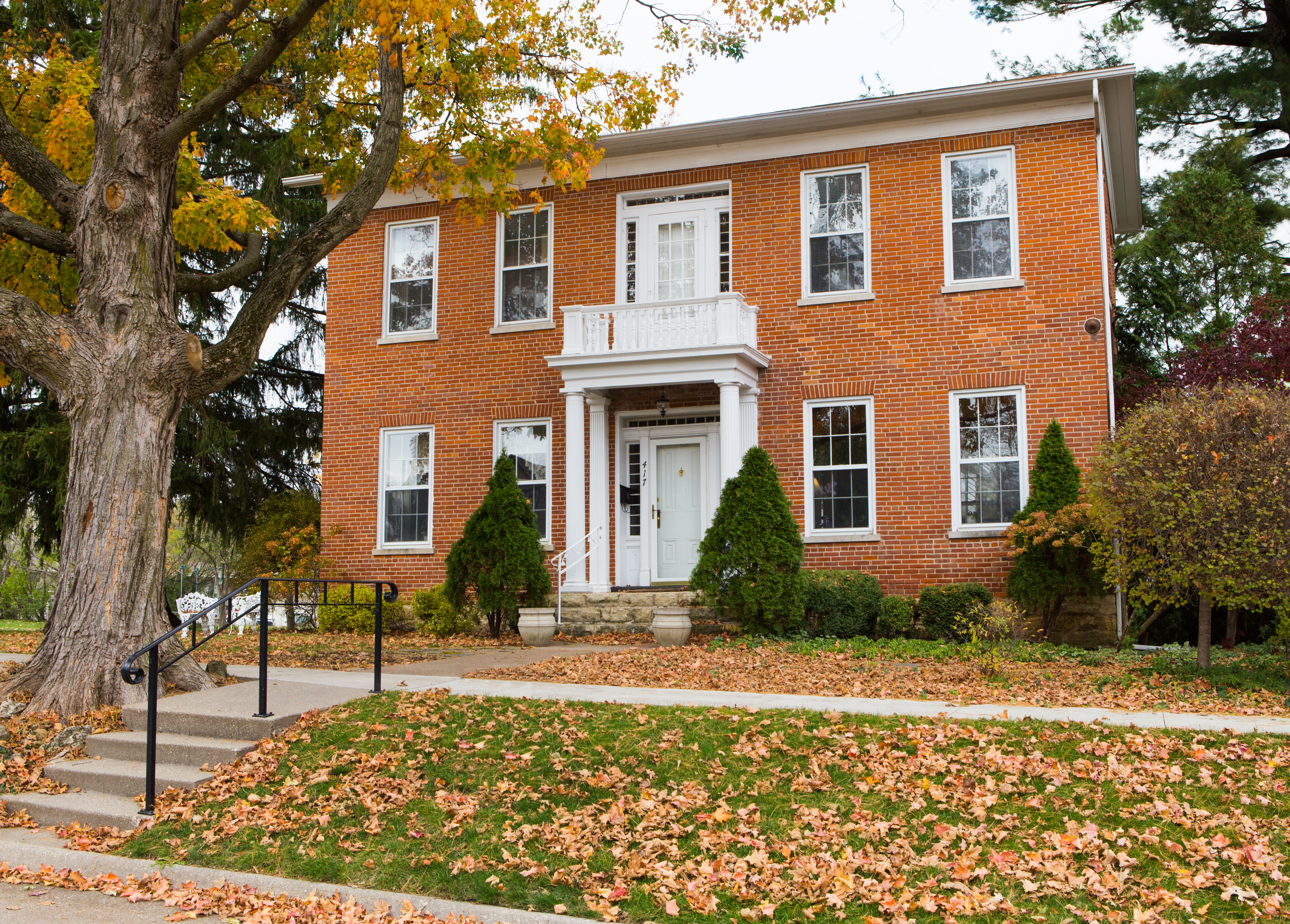

- Location within Iowa Location within the United States
- Location: 417 A Ave. SE; Mount Vernon, Iowa
- Coordinates: 41°55′09″N 91°25′08″W
- Area: less than one acre
- Built: c.1857
- MPS: Mount Vernon MPS
- NRHP reference No.: 100005488
- Added to NRHP: August 27, 2020

The Adams R., Frederick L. and Martha (Taylor) Knott House, also known as the Col. Frank W. Hart House and the Rev. James and Jessie N. Hughes House, is a historic building located in Mount Vernon, Iowa, United States. It is significant for its association with the settlement of the city that was influenced by the establishment of the Military Road, its use of locally made brick and locally quarried limestone, and its vernacular architectural techniques. Adams and Frederick Knott were brothers who were originally from Ohio and they settled in Mount Vernon in 1854 after living briefly in other locations in eastern Iowa. They bought a building and dry goods store from Oliver Day, an early pioneer merchant. Their brother Abraham joined them in the business by 1859. Frederick and Adams had this house built around 1857 in Saxby's Addition to Mount Vernon. They shared the house, along with Frederick's wife Martha and daughter Ida. The brother's business partnership dissolved and they sold the house in 1861. The two-story, side-gabled brick house features Early Republic stylistic influences. The house was listed on the National Register of Historic Places in 2020.
