= Martin L. and Mary Jane (Yount) Shantz House =

Historic house in Iowa, United States

- U.S. National Register of Historic Places
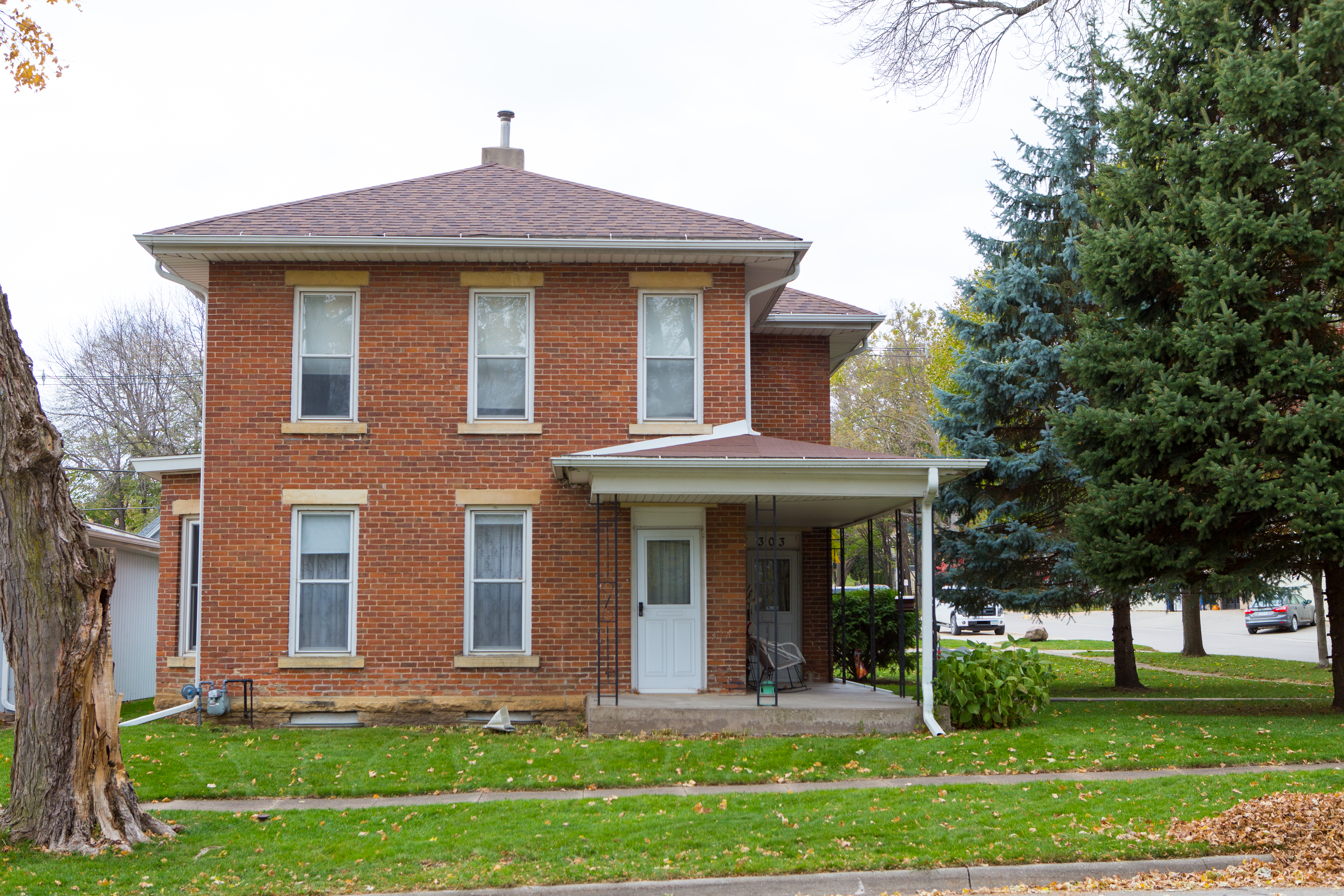

- Location within Iowa Location within the United States
- Location: 303 A Ave. SE; Mount Vernon, Iowa
- Coordinates: 41°55′13″N 91°25′04″W
- Area: less than one acre
- Built: 1882
- MPS: Mount Vernon MPS
- NRHP reference No.: 100005499
- Added to NRHP: August 27, 2020

The Martin L. and Mary Jane (Yount) Shantz House is a historic building located in Mount Vernon, Iowa, United States. It is significant for being constructed of locally made brick and locally quarried limestone, and its Late Victorian architectural influences. It was built in 1882 on two lots in Saxby's Addition to Mount Vernon. The house is a two-story, L-shaped brick structure with a low-pitched hip roof, wide eaves, tall windows that enhance its verticality, and a three-sided bay window. It is a vernacular expression of Late Victorian stylistic influences. The house lacks elaborate exterior decorative elements and a substantial front porch at a time when they were popular. This either reflects the Shantz's preferences or a lack of finances to include them. The bricks used in its construction were more than likely from the G.W. Robinson brickyard, the main brick and lime manufacturer in Mount Vernon at the time. Shantz's blacksmith shop was also located on the property. The house was listed on the National Register of Historic Places in 2020.
