= Best Oil and Refining Company Service Station =

- U.S. National Register of Historic Places
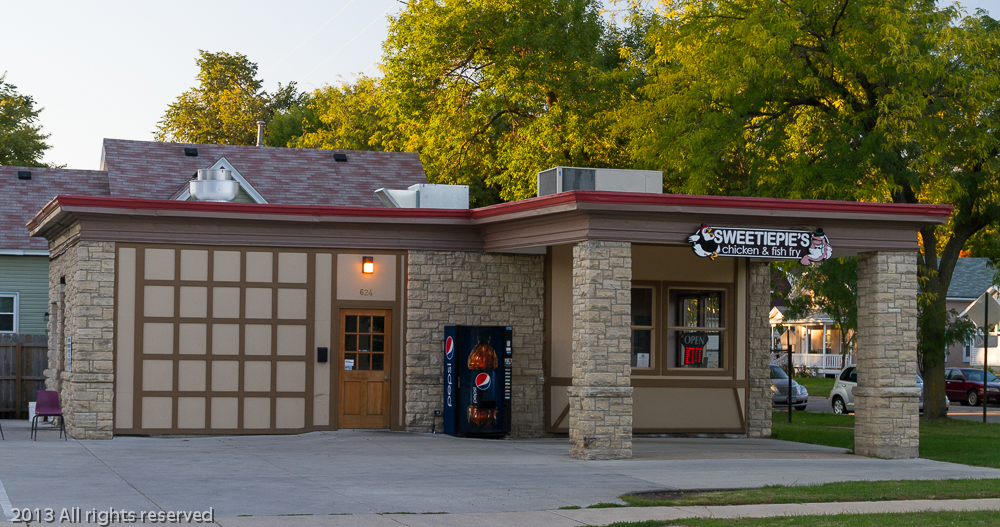

- Location within Iowa Location within the United States
- Location: 624 12th Ave., SE; Cedar Rapids, Iowa
- Coordinates: 41°58′22.1″N 91°39′14.8″W
- Area: less than one acre
- Built: 1930
- NRHP reference No.: 14000359
- Added to NRHP: June 27, 2014

The Best Oil and Refining Company Service Station is a historic building located in Cedar Rapids, Iowa, United States. This was the third service station built by business partners George D. Shaler and George J. Albright. Albright had previously been a building contractor and had owned a lumberyard, while Shaler was one of the founders of the Best Oil Company. The two were also in a partnership that acquired a limestone quarry in Stone City, Iowa, and that stone may have been used for the exterior of this building. This service station was located near a southeast side residential neighborhood, commercial and industrial areas from which it could attract customers. Built in 1930, the station sold gasoline and provided a wide range of automobile related maintenance needs until 1960 when it and other local service station operators gave way to the larger chain stores. While the station originally sold its own Best Oil brand gasoline, it eventually sold national brands such as Conoco. The building features a large canopy where the pumps were located, a metal cornice, and a service bay. After its use as a service station came to an end, the building has housed several non-automobile related businesses. It was listed on the National Register of Historic Places in 2014.
