= Elijah D. and Mary J. (Adams) Waln House =

Historic house in Iowa, United States

- U.S. National Register of Historic Places
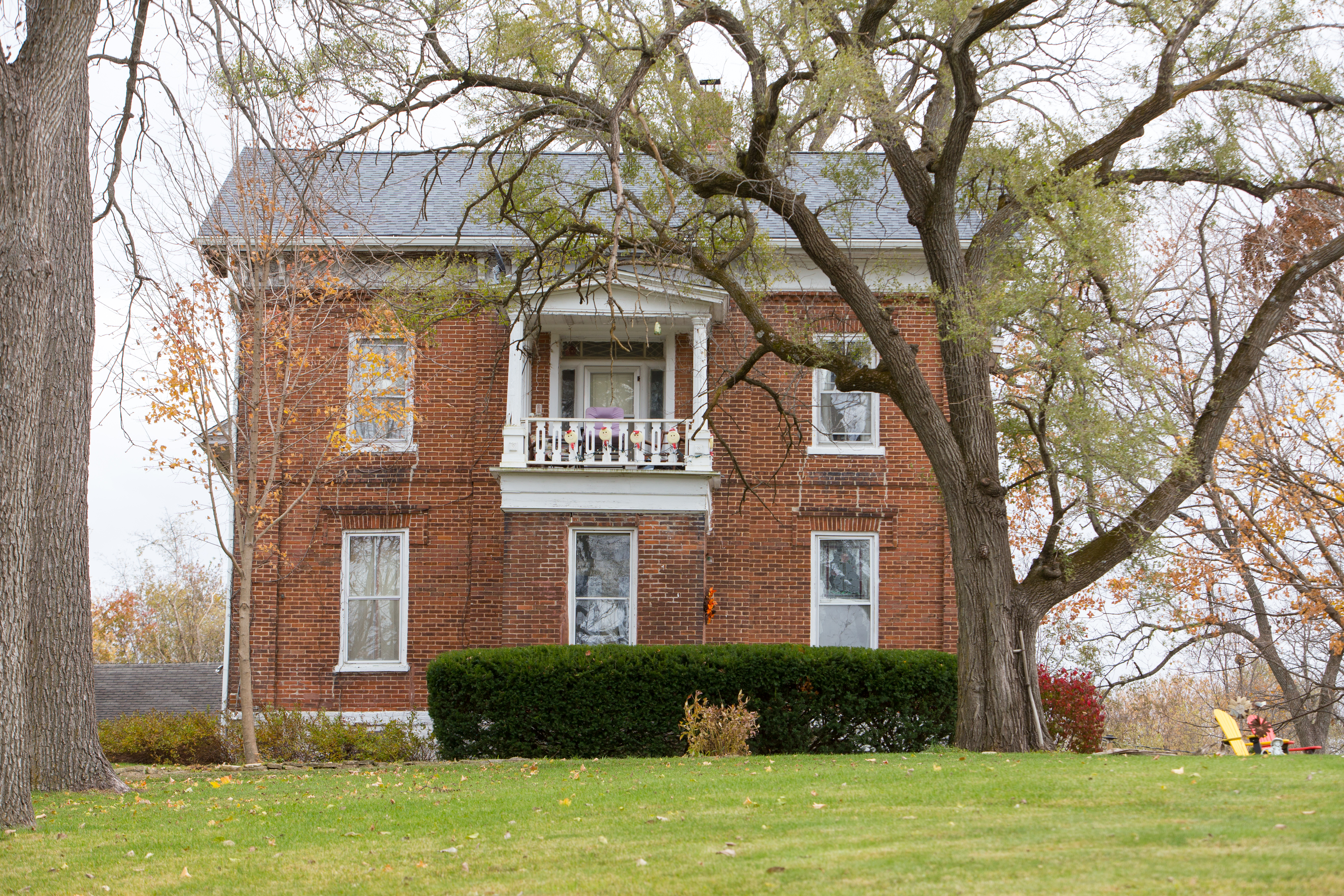

- Location within Iowa Location within the United States
- Location: 323 3rd St. NE; Mount Vernon, Iowa
- Coordinates: 41°55′22″N 91°24′44″W
- Area: less than one acre
- Built: c.1856
- Built by: Henry D. Albright; William D. Albright
- MPS: Mount Vernon MPS
- NRHP reference No.: 100005492
- Added to NRHP: August 27, 2020

The Elijah D. and Mary J. (Adams) Waln House, also known as the C.P. and Gertrude E. Whittemore House, is a historic building located in Mount Vernon, Iowa, United States. It is significant with the settlement of the city that was influenced by the establishment of the Military Road, for being constructed of locally made brick and locally quarried limestone, and its Greek Revival architecture. Elijah and Mary Waln and their family were early pioneers in Mount Vernon. He set up the first general variety store in town, and was also one of the founders, a trustee, and a benefactor of Cornell College. He also served in the Iowa House of Representatives. The family's first house was a 2½-story frame structure that they had built when they moved to town. It was replaced around 1865 with this two-story, brick, Greek Revival-style residence. Waln hired brothers Henry and William Albright, who were Mount Vernon's first masons and owned its first brickyard, to build the new house. They lived here until 1892 when they sold the house to C.P. Whittemore, who added the rear addition and enclosed the lower part of the front porch in 1900. The house was listed on the National Register of Historic Places in 2020.
