= George W. and Mary J. (Maxwell) Robinson House =

Historic house in Iowa, United States

- U.S. National Register of Historic Places
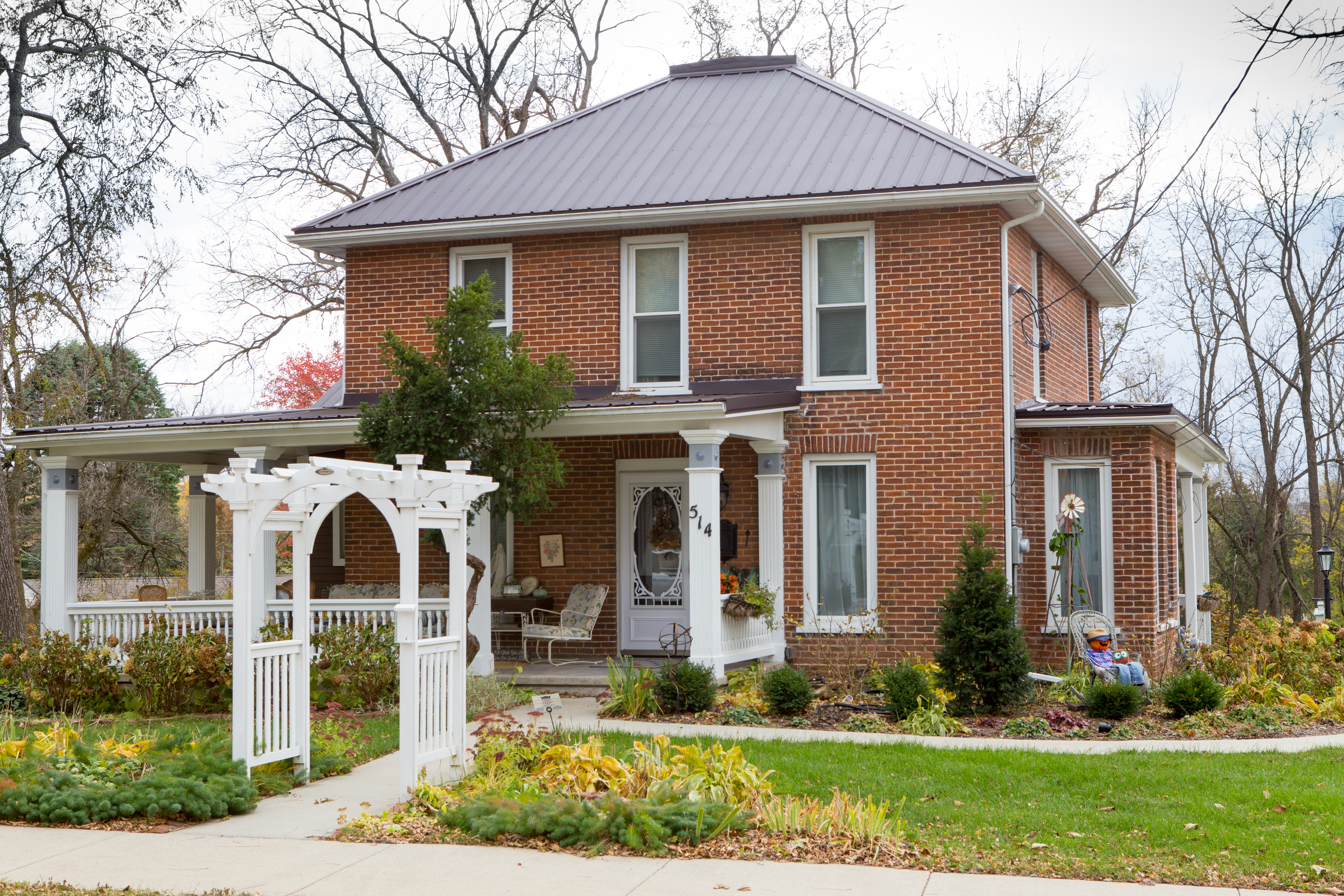

- Location within Iowa Location within the United States
- Location: 514 1st St. SE; Mount Vernon, Iowa
- Coordinates: 41°55′12″N 91°24′45″W
- Area: less than one acre
- Built: 1887
- Built by: George W. Robinson
- MPS: Mount Vernon MPS
- NRHP reference No.: 100005494
- Added to NRHP: August 27, 2020

The George W. and Mary J. (Maxwell) Robinson House, also known as the Johnston B. Robinson House, is a historic building located in Mount Vernon, Iowa, United States. It is significant for being constructed of locally made brick and locally quarried limestone, and its vernacular architectural techniques. This house probably incorporated the original single-story frame house that was built at this location c. 1865. In 1887, George W. Robinson rebuilt the house as a two-story brick structure. It was built on the same property as Robinson's brickyard, the main brick and lime manufacturer in Mount Vernon at the time. The American Vernacular house is capped with a hipped roof and it features a wrap-around Neoclassical front porch that was added in the early 1900s. It was listed on the National Register of Historic Places in 2020.
