= Cedar Rapids Milk Condensing Company =

- U.S. National Register of Historic Places
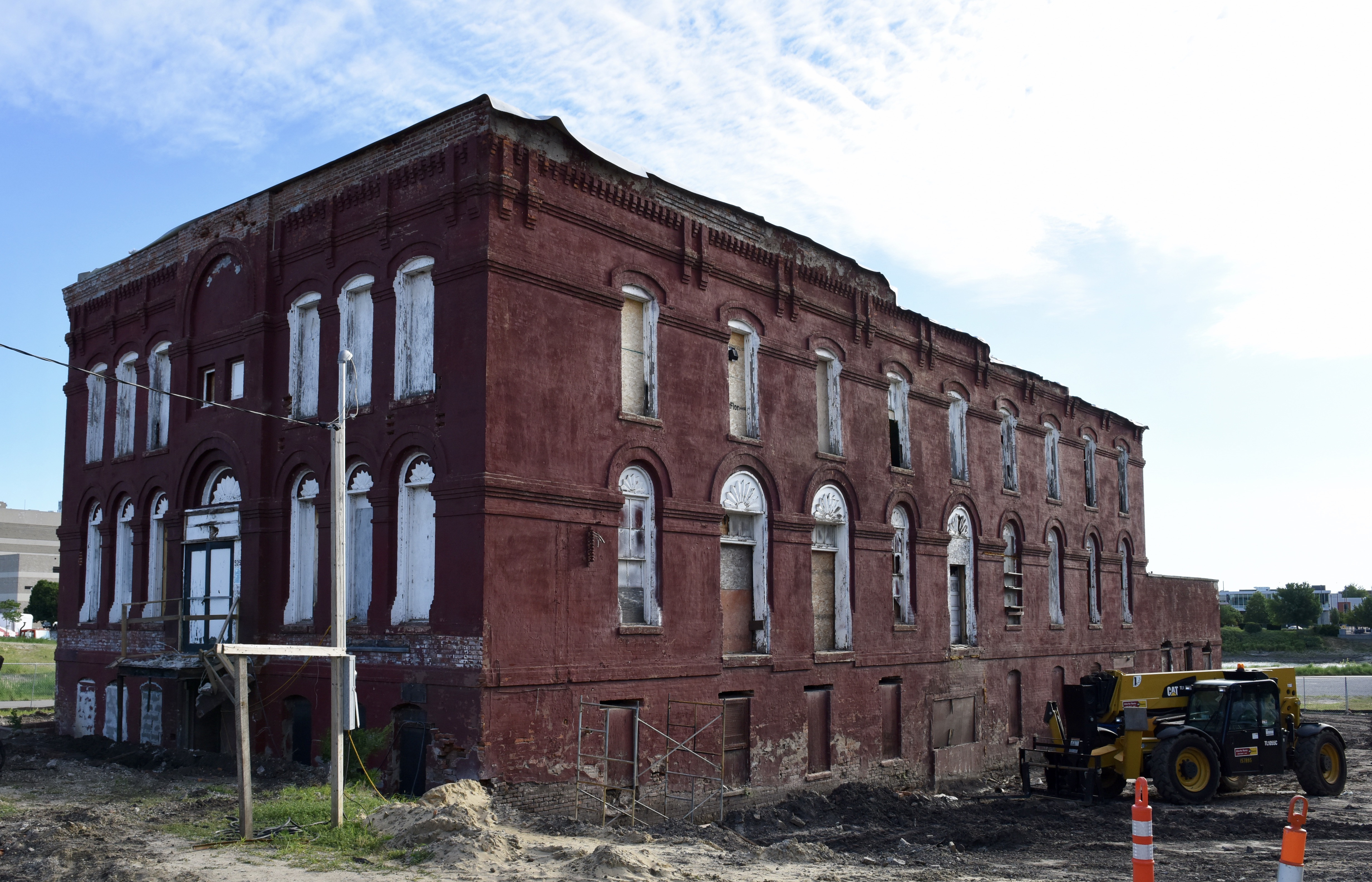

- Location within Iowa Location within the United States
- Location: 525 Valor Way, SW; Cedar Rapids, Iowa
- Coordinates: 41°58′20.8″N 91°40′07.2″W
- Built: 1887
- MPS: Commercial & Industrial Development of Cedar Rapids MPS
- NRHP reference No.: 100000966
- Added to NRHP: May 8, 2017

The Cedar Rapids Milk Condensing Company, also known as Knutson Building, and the Chelsea, is a historic building located in Cedar Rapids, Iowa, United States. It was built in 1887, and it is one of the few commercial structures that remains along the west side of the Cedar River from that era. Besides the Cedar Rapids Milk Condensing Company, the building was also used by the Knutsons for their junk business. It was used for storage and it was also used as a haunted house before it could no longer be occupied. The building has been transformed into 18 market-rate apartments called the Chelsea. It was listed on the National Register of Historic Places in 2017.
