= Dr. Luther L. and Susette E. (Baker) Pease House =

Historic house in Iowa, United States

- U.S. National Register of Historic Places
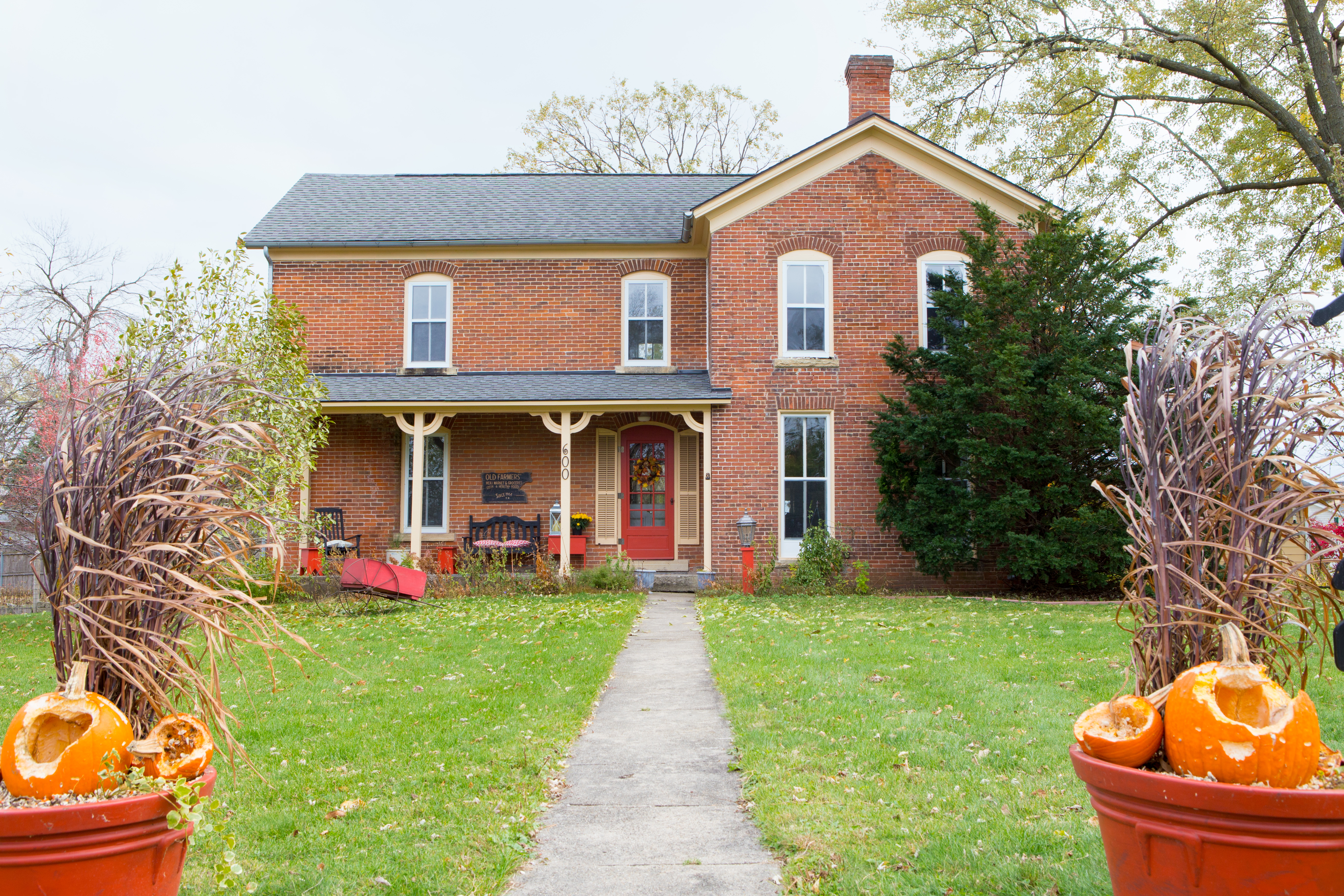

- Location within Iowa Location within the United States
- Location: 417 A Ave. SE; Mount Vernon, Iowa
- Coordinates: 41°55′09″N 91°25′08″W
- Area: less than one acre
- Built: c. 1866
- MPS: Mount Vernon MPS
- NRHP reference No.: 100005488
- Added to NRHP: August 27, 2020

The Dr. Luther L. and Susette E. (Baker) Pease House is a historic building located in Mount Vernon, Iowa, United States. It is significant for its association with the settlement of the city that was influenced by the establishment of the Military Road, its use of locally made brick and locally quarried limestone, and its vernacular architectural techniques. Located at the intersection of the Military Road and the Cedar Rapids Road, it is thought this house was constructed in two parts. The front gable section on the right may have been built by the Albright brothers in the 1850s. They owned one of the early brickyards in town and built several houses. The side-gabled section on the left is believed to have been built after Dr. Pease bought the property in 1866. It was built using bricks from the G.W. Robinson brickyard, the main brick and lime manufacturer in Mount Vernon at the time. Pease was a prominent physician in town and served as the city's first mayor. The two-story brick house features mid-19th century stylistic influences. It was listed on the National Register of Historic Places in 2020.
