= Iowa State Highway Commission, District 6 Building =

Historic building in Iowa, United States

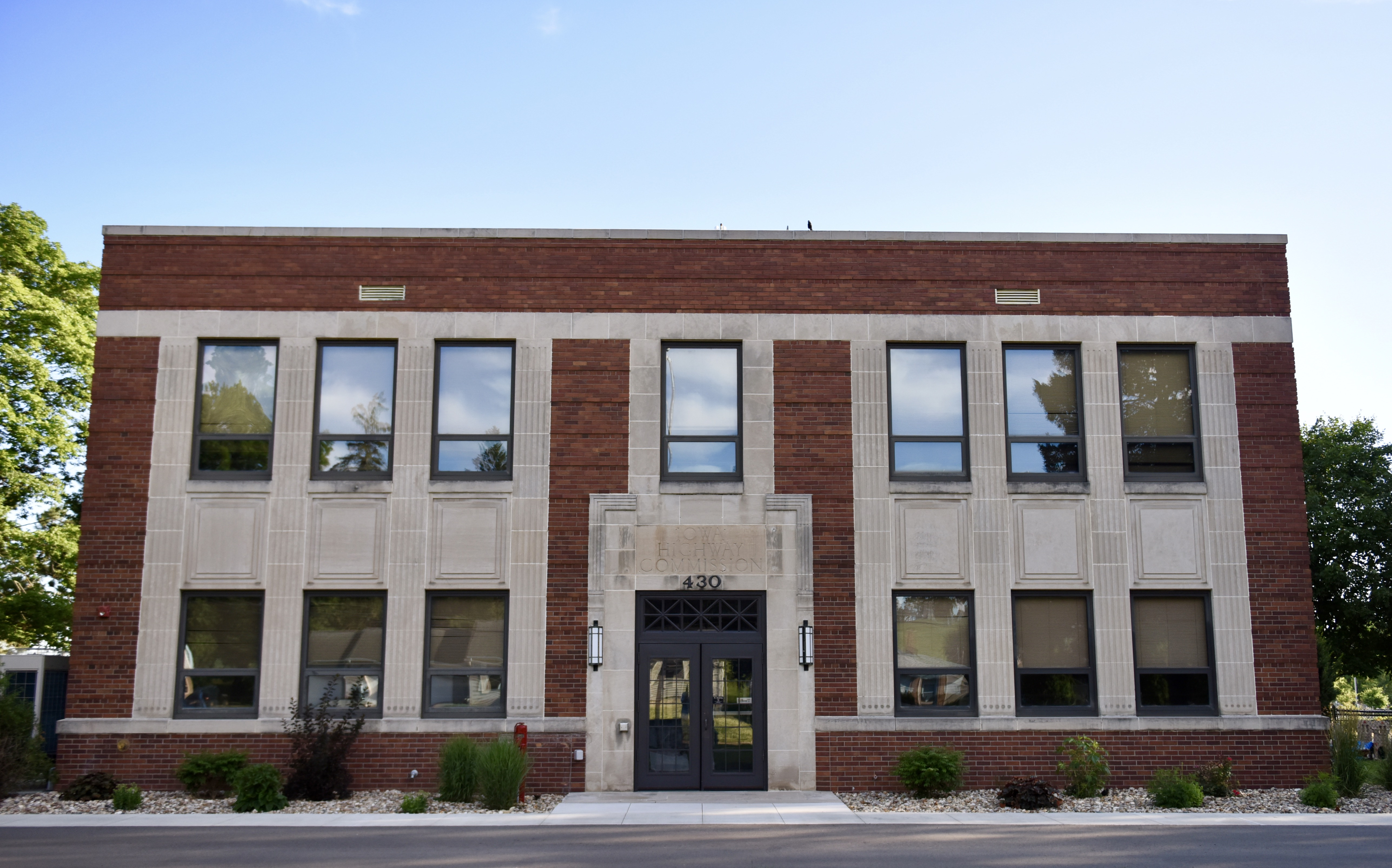
- The building in 2017

- Location within Iowa Location within the United States
- Location: 430 16th Ave., SW. Cedar Rapids, Iowa
- Coordinates: 41°57′43.9″N 91°40′33.2″W
- Area: 2.2 acres (0.89 ha)
- Built: 1939
- Architectural style: Classical Revival
- NRHP reference No.: January 17, 2017
- Added to NRHP: 100000486

Iowa State Highway Commission, District 6 Building, also known as Iowa Department of Transportation building, is a historic building located in Cedar Rapids, Iowa, United States. It is significant for its association with the Iowa Highway Commission and its role developing policy and designing and implementing highway construction projects. It is also significant for its association with the New Deal program, the Public Works Administration. Completed in 1939, it was utilized by the Iowa Department of Transportation from then until 2012. U.S. Highway 30 (US 30) aligned with 16th Ave., SW in front the building from c. 1939 until it was aligned again in 1953 to bypass Cedar Rapids. US 30 had its origins in the Lincoln Highway, which followed a different route through the city.

The architect of the building in unknown. It is a two-story brick structure built over a basement. Neoclassicism is found in its highly ordered symmetry and its decorative elements, especially the restrained fluted pilasters and rectangular spandrels. The building was listed on the National Register of Historic Places in 2017.
