= Cedar Rapids Central Fire Station =

- U.S. National Register of Historic Places
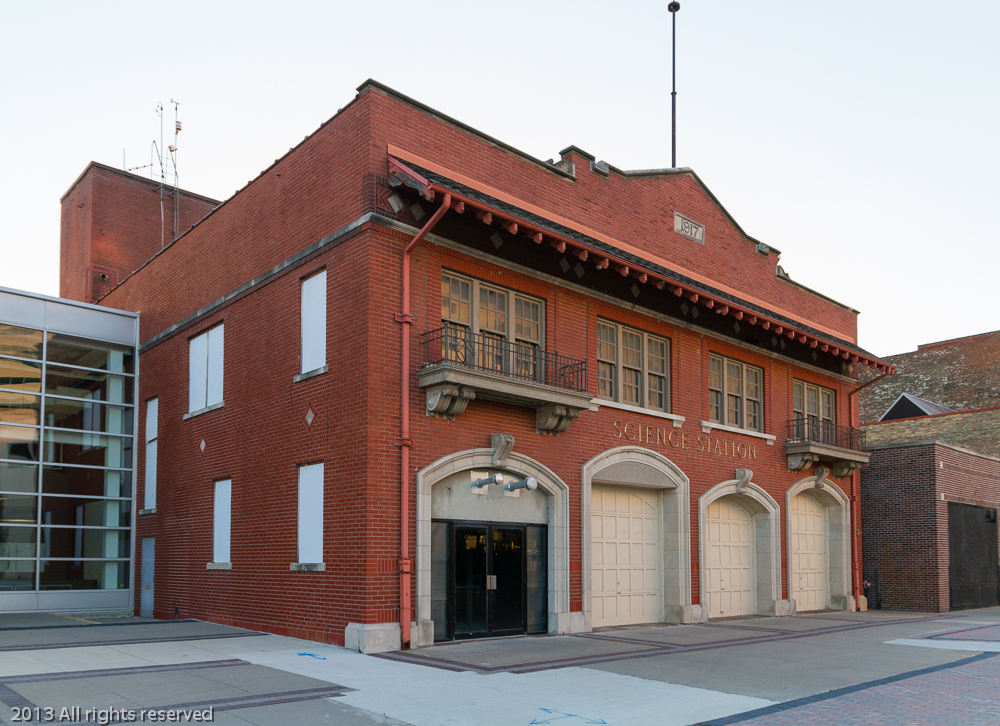

- Location within Iowa Location within the United States
- Location: 427 1st St., SE; Cedar Rapids, Iowa
- Coordinates: 41°58′29.1″N 91°40′0.5″W
- Area: less than one acre
- Built: 1918
- Architect: Charles A. Dieman
- Architectural style: Mission/Spanish Colonial Revival
- NRHP reference No.: 14000175
- Added to NRHP: April 29, 2014

Cedar Rapids Central Fire Station, also known as Cedar Rapids Hose Company No. 1 and the Cedar Rapids Science Station, is a historic building located in Cedar Rapids, Iowa, United States. It served as the city's fire department headquarters and downtown fire station from 1918 to 1985. It replaced a frame structure in the northeast quadrant, and was part of a larger program of building new facilities for the local fire department. The building program was a response to a series of disastrous fires, changing technology, and the city's growth. This fire station served from the era of horse-drawn pumper wagons to the modern era of fire engines, pumpers, and hook and ladder trucks. The two-story, brick Mission and Spanish Colonial Revival structure was designed by local architect Charles A. Dieman. In the mid-20th century a two-story kitchen addition was built onto the back of the building.

After its use as a fire station the building was incorporated into a new science center in 2000. The interior of the building was damaged during flooding in 2008. When a new Central Fire Station was built in 2013 to replace the 1985 building that was destroyed in the same flood, it incorporated design elements from this building. The 1918 fire station was acquired by a downtown development corporation who plan to convert it into office space. The building was listed on the National Register of Historic Places in 2014.
