= Cedar Rapids 2nd Avenue SE. Automobile Row Historic District =

Historic district in Iowa, United States

- U.S. National Register of Historic Places
- U.S. Historic district
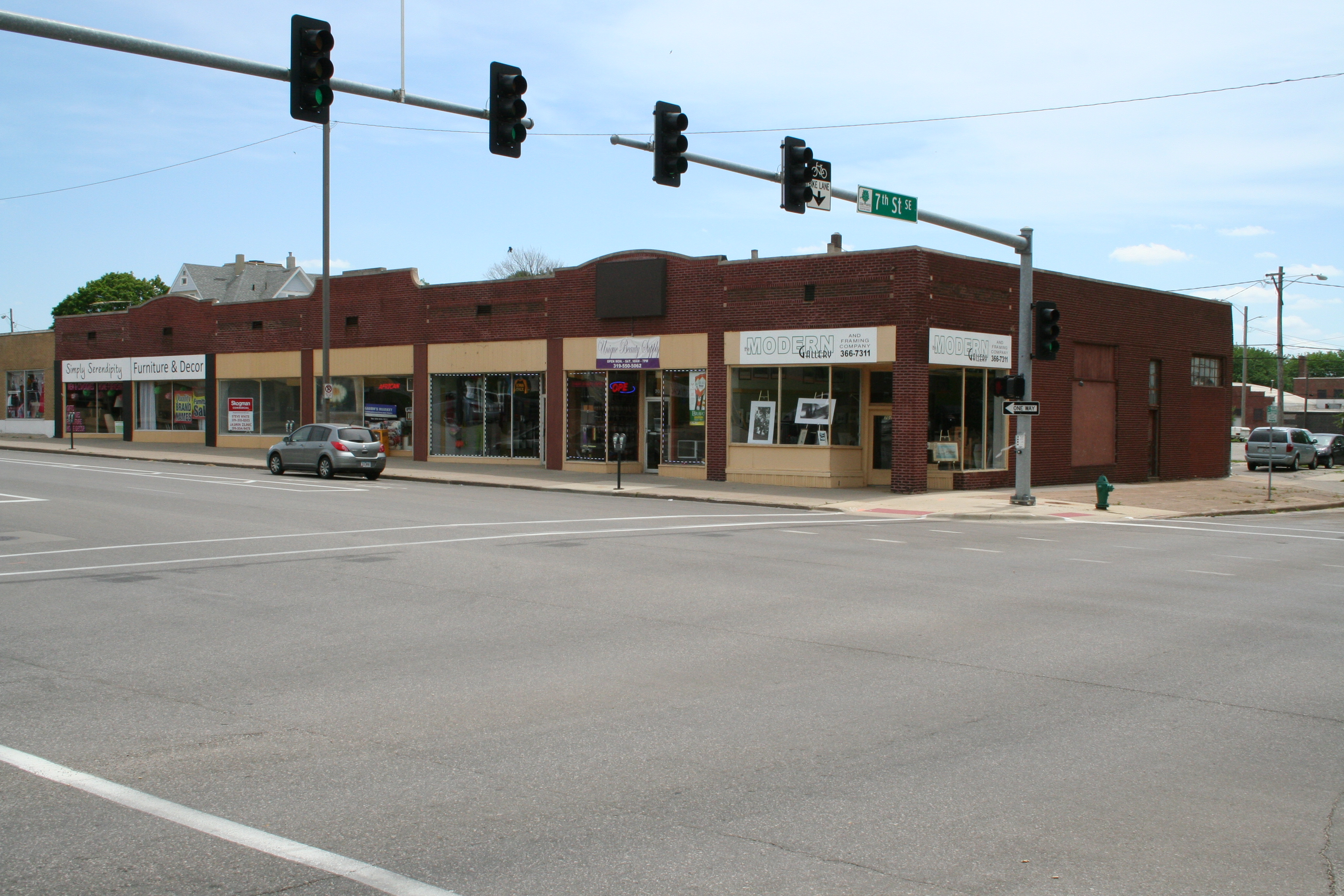

- Location within Iowa Location within the United States
- Location: Roughly 2nd to 3rd Aves., SE., from 6th to 8th Sts., SE, Cedar Rapids, Iowa
- Coordinates: 41°58′49″N 91°39′45″W
- Area: 10.63 acres (4.30 ha)
- Architectural style: Late Victorian; Modern Movement
- NRHP reference No.: 15000749
- Added to NRHP: October 23, 2015

The Cedar Rapids 2nd Avenue SE. Automobile Row Historic District is a nationally recognized historic district located in Cedar Rapids, Iowa, United States. It was listed on the National Register of Historic Places in 2015. At the time of its nomination it consisted of 24 resources, which included 17 contributing buildings, two contributing sites, four non-contributing buildings, and one non-contributing structure. This is a collection of commercial buildings that were built along the old Lincoln Highway between 1912 and 1953 to house automobile dealerships. They feature broad fronts with large display windows and open interiors. Auto repair shops were generally located at the rear of a dealership, but some were located in their own utilitarian buildings. Some of the corner lots were taken up by small gas stations. In later years, sales lots were placed adjacent to dealerships in order to display a larger number of cars. Other lots were occupied by used car lots. Prior to being converted into an automobile-centric commercial area, the district was a Victorian-era residential neighborhood. The multi-family dwelling at 309 8th St. SE remains as a reminder of that era, and it is one of the contributing properties.
