= Luther A. and Elinore T. Brewer House =

Historic building in Cedar Rapids, Iowa, United States

- U.S. National Register of Historic Places
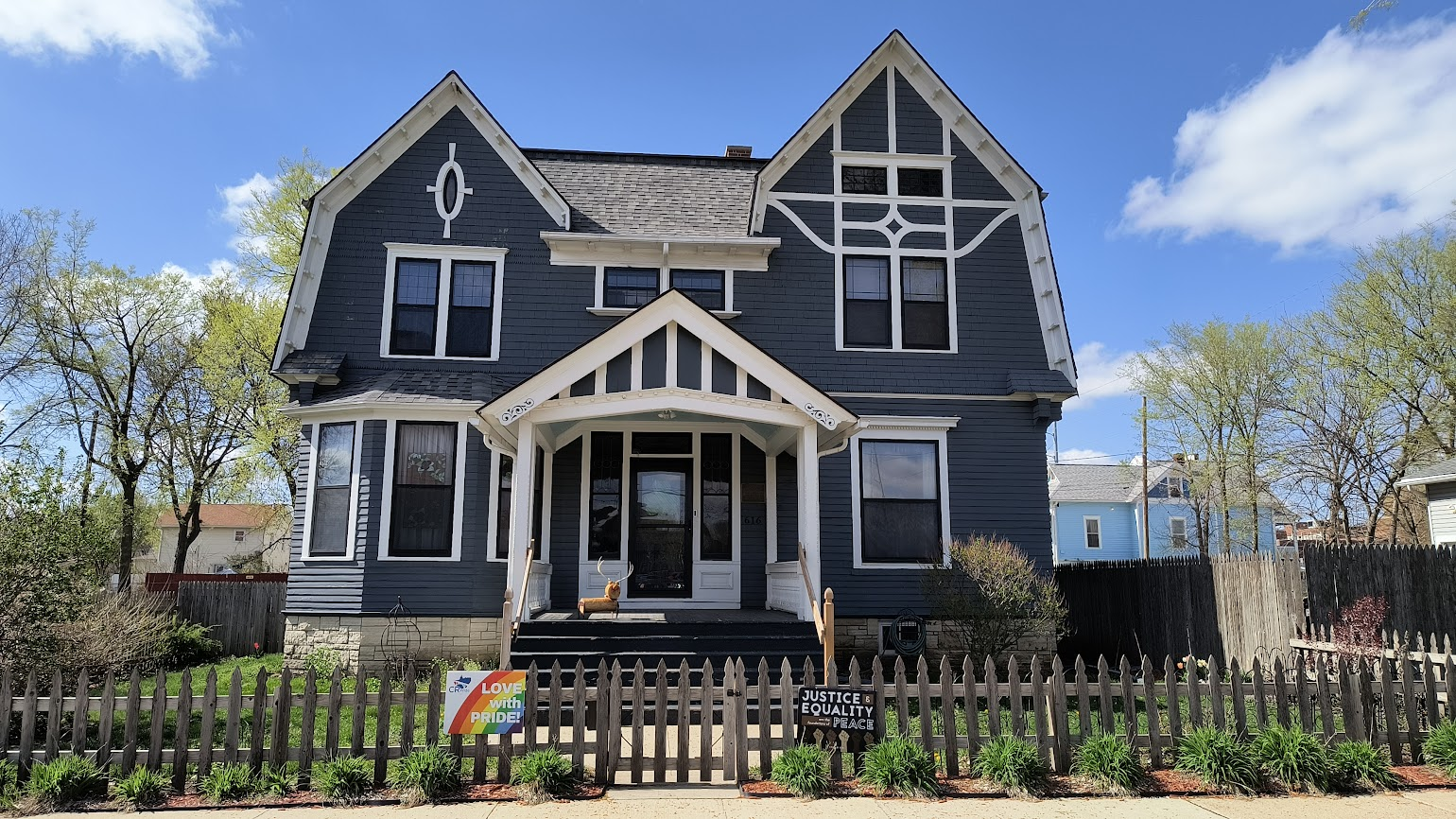
- Location: 616 10th Ave., SE; Cedar Rapids, Iowa
- Area: less than one acre
- Built: 1897
- Architect: Charles Dieman
- Architectural style: Late Victorian
- NRHP reference No.: 100011084
- Added to NRHP: December 2, 2024

The Luther A. and Elinore T. Brewer House is a historic building located in Cedar Rapids, Iowa, United States. Local architect Charles Dieman designed this 2 1/2-story Late Victorian home. It was completed in 1898 for publisher Luther Albertus Brewer.

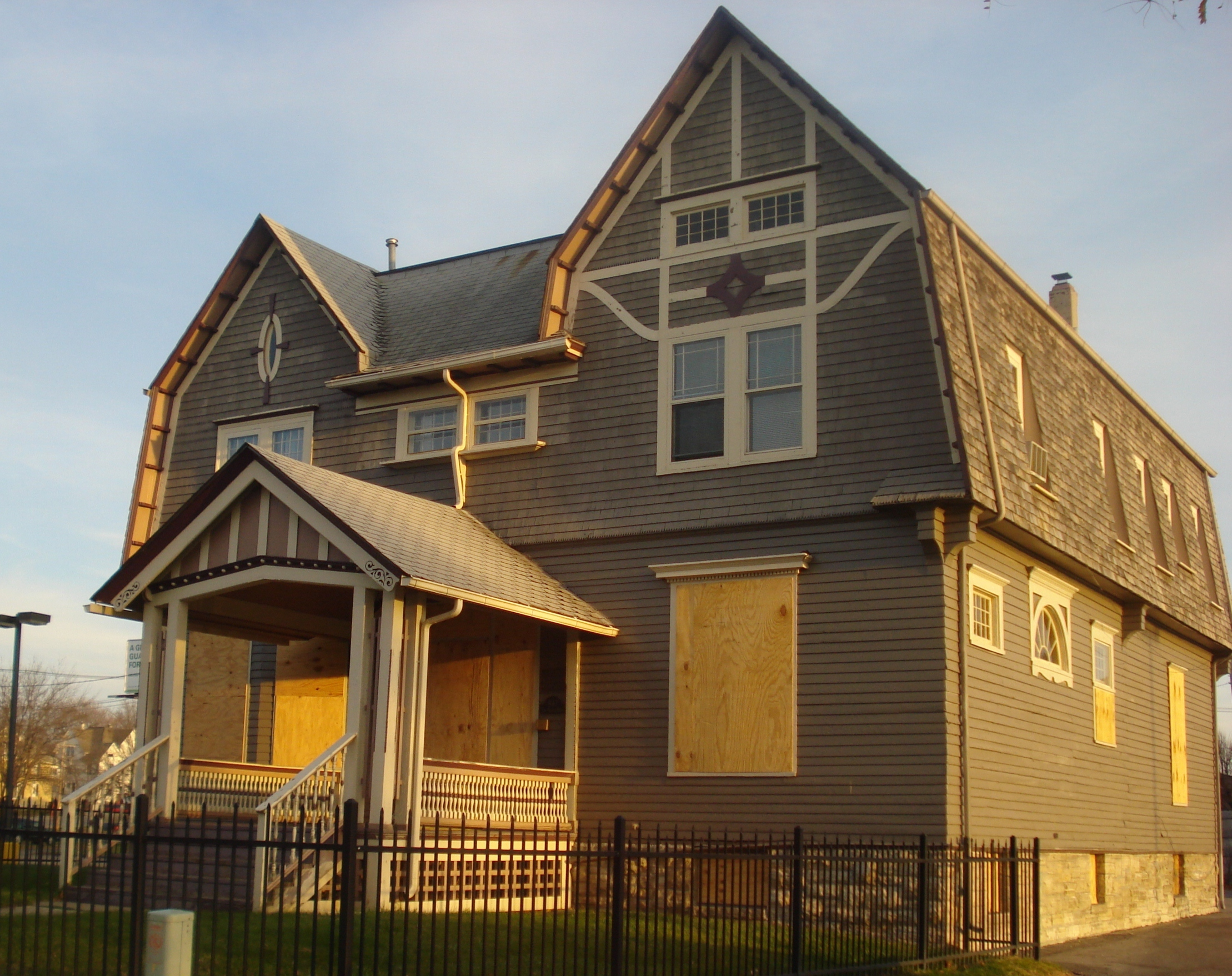

The house was built at 847 4th Avenue SE and listed on the National Register of Historic Places in 1993. It was moved to 616 10th Avenue SE on April 4, 2014, and re-listed on the National Register on December 2, 2024.

Brewer owned the Cedar Rapids Republican, owned the Torch Press, and was a book collector. He and his wife Elinore helped found the first library in Cedar Rapids. William Howard Taft was a repeat visitor to the home. Both Brewers died in 1933.
