= James H. and Mayetta (Degrush) McCartney House =

Historic house in Iowa, United States

- U.S. National Register of Historic Places
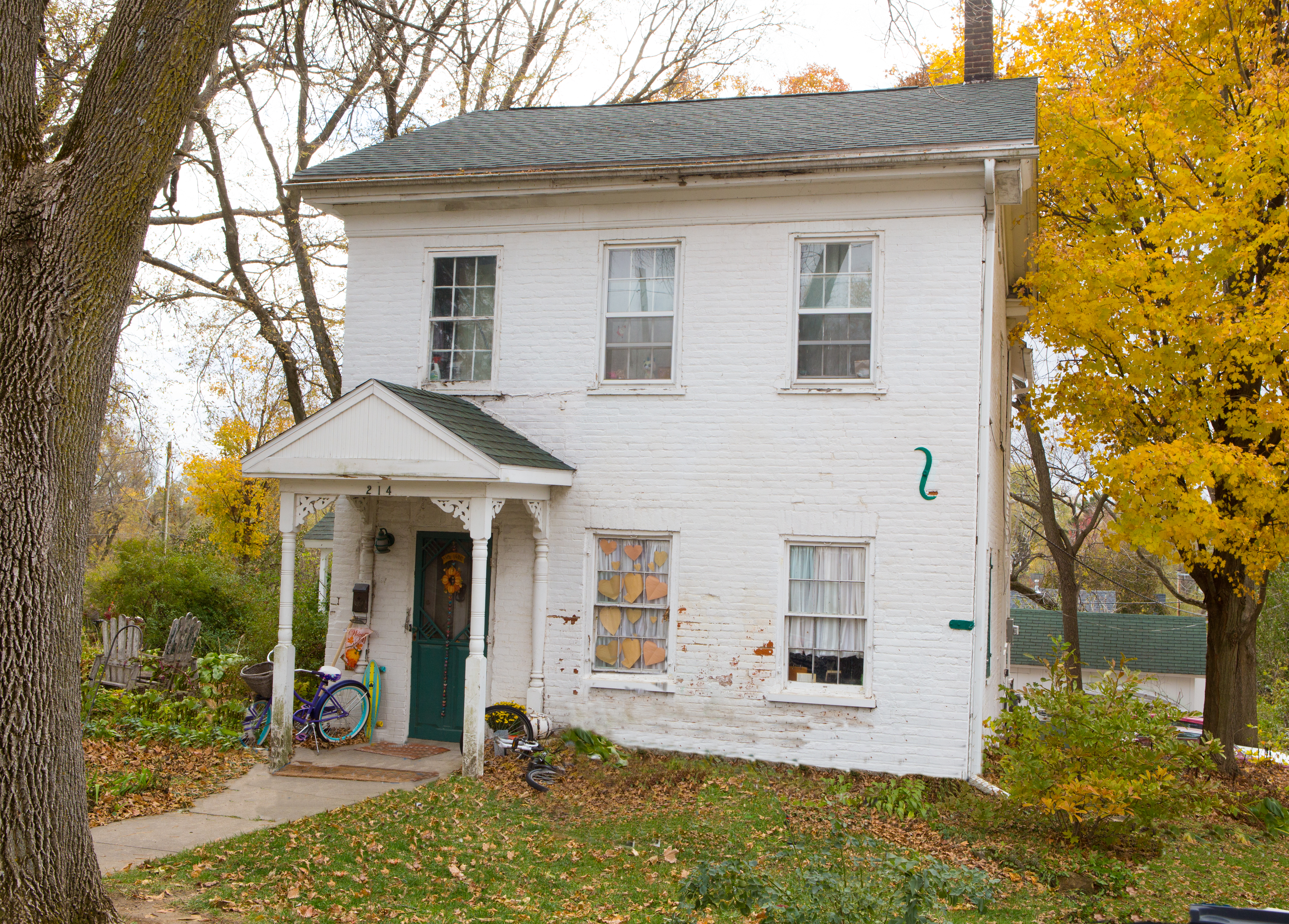

- Location within Iowa Location within the United States
- Location: 214 2nd St. SE; Mount Vernon, Iowa
- Coordinates: 41°55′14″N 91°24′59″W
- Area: less than one acre
- Built: 1861
- Architectural style: Greek Revival
- MPS: Mount Vernon MPS
- NRHP reference No.: 100005498
- Added to NRHP: August 27, 2020

The James H. and Mayetta (Degrush) McCartney House, also known as the Ann E. and DeWitt McLallen House, is a historic building located in Mount Vernon, Iowa, United States. It is significant for being constructed of locally made brick and locally quarried limestone, and mid-19th century architectural techniques. The house was originally built as a single-story, two-room cottage. It was probably built sometime after Saxby's First Addition to Mount Vernon, in which it is located, was platted in 1855. The second story was added around 1861. This made it a side-gabled Greek Revival house. A two-story wood-frame addition was built onto the rear of the brick structure in 1877. The house was listed on the National Register of Historic Places in 2020.
