= Podhajsky-Jansa Farmstead District =

Historic district in Iowa, United States

- U.S. National Register of Historic Places
- U.S. Historic district
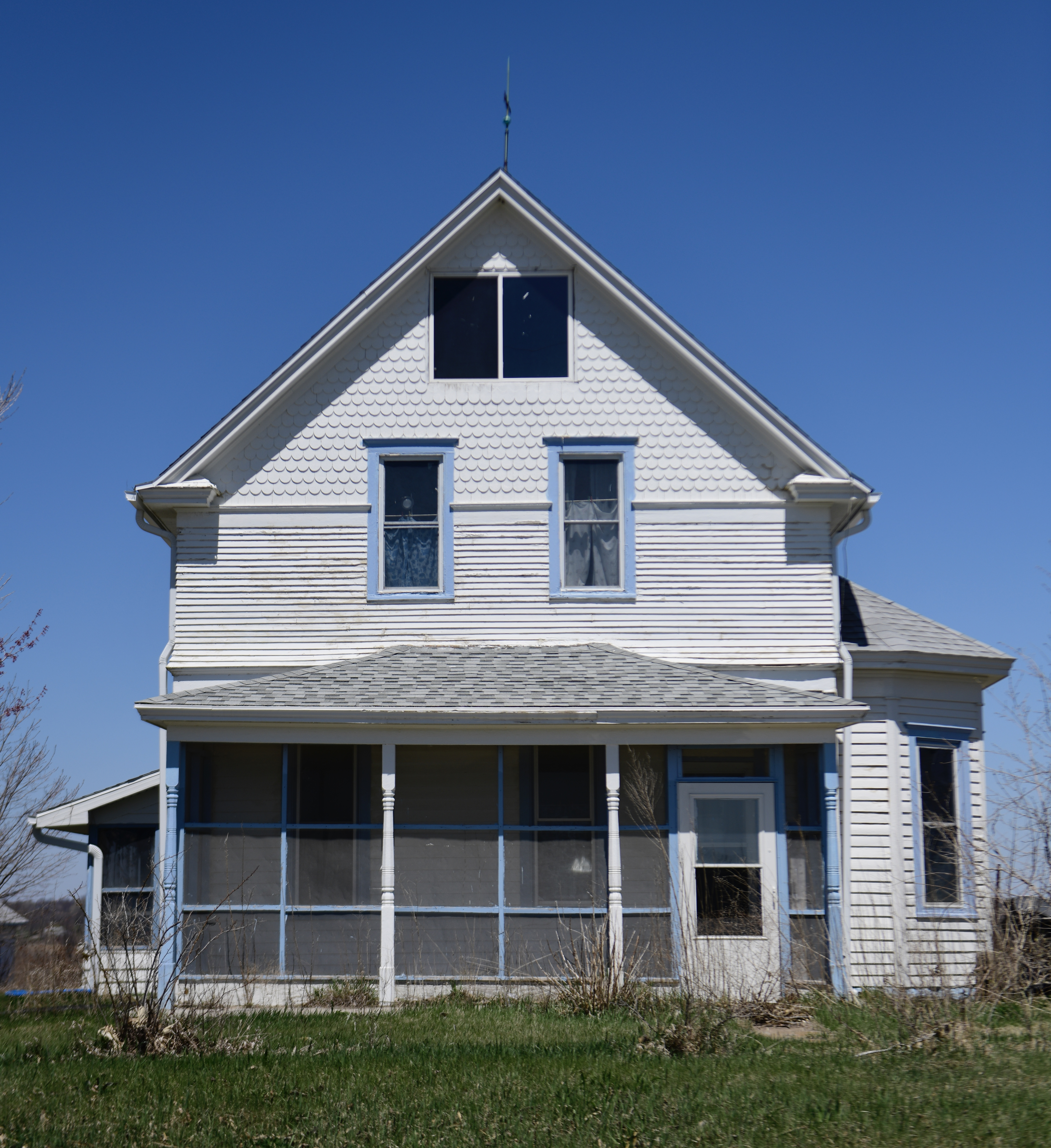

- Location within Iowa Location within the United States
- Location: Hoosier Creek Rd. Ely, Iowa
- Coordinates: 41°51′41″N 91°36′30″W
- Area: 3 acres (1.2 ha)
- Built: 1877, 1907
- Built by: Albert Jansa
- MPS: Early Settlement and Ethnic Properties of Linn County, Iowa MPS
- NRHP reference No.: 00001082
- Added to NRHP: September 14, 2000

The Podhajsky-Jansa Farmstead District is an agricultural historic district located southwest of Ely, Iowa, United States. It was listed on the National Register of Historic Places in 2000. At the time of its nomination it consisted of 12 resources, which included five contributing buildings, four contributing structures, and three non-contributing structures. The historic buildings include two small side gabled houses (c. 1860s-1880s); a two-story, frame, American Foursquare house (1910s or 1920s); a gabled barn that was moved here from another farm (1890s-early 1900s); and a feeder barn (c. 1912). One of two corncribs (1933), a hog house (early 1900s), and a chicken house (early 1900s) are the historic structures. Another corncrib and a couple of metal sheds from the mid to late 20th century are the non-contributing structures.

While the farm dates from at least 1869, it reflects the early settlement of Bohemian immigrants in the county beginning with Joseph and Ann Podhajsky in 1877. John Podhajsky was listed as the owner in 1895, but this could be a mistake as there is no John in the family and Joseph was still alive. Frank Hyuck owned the farm from c. 1902 to 1907. Albert and Josephine Jansa bought the farm in 1907, and it remained in their family into the 1990s. The two small side gabled houses are indicative of a Bohemian immigrant farm. The older of the two was built here in the 1860s or 1870s, and is a step up from a log cabin. It was a gabled cottage with sleeping loft above. The second house was built elsewhere in the 1870s or 1880s and moved here by the Podhajskys in 1880s or 1890s and added to the original house to create a larger house. After the larger family home was built these two houses were separated and repurposed for other uses.
