= Philip A. Wolff House and Carriage House =

Historic house in Iowa, United States

- U.S. National Register of Historic Places
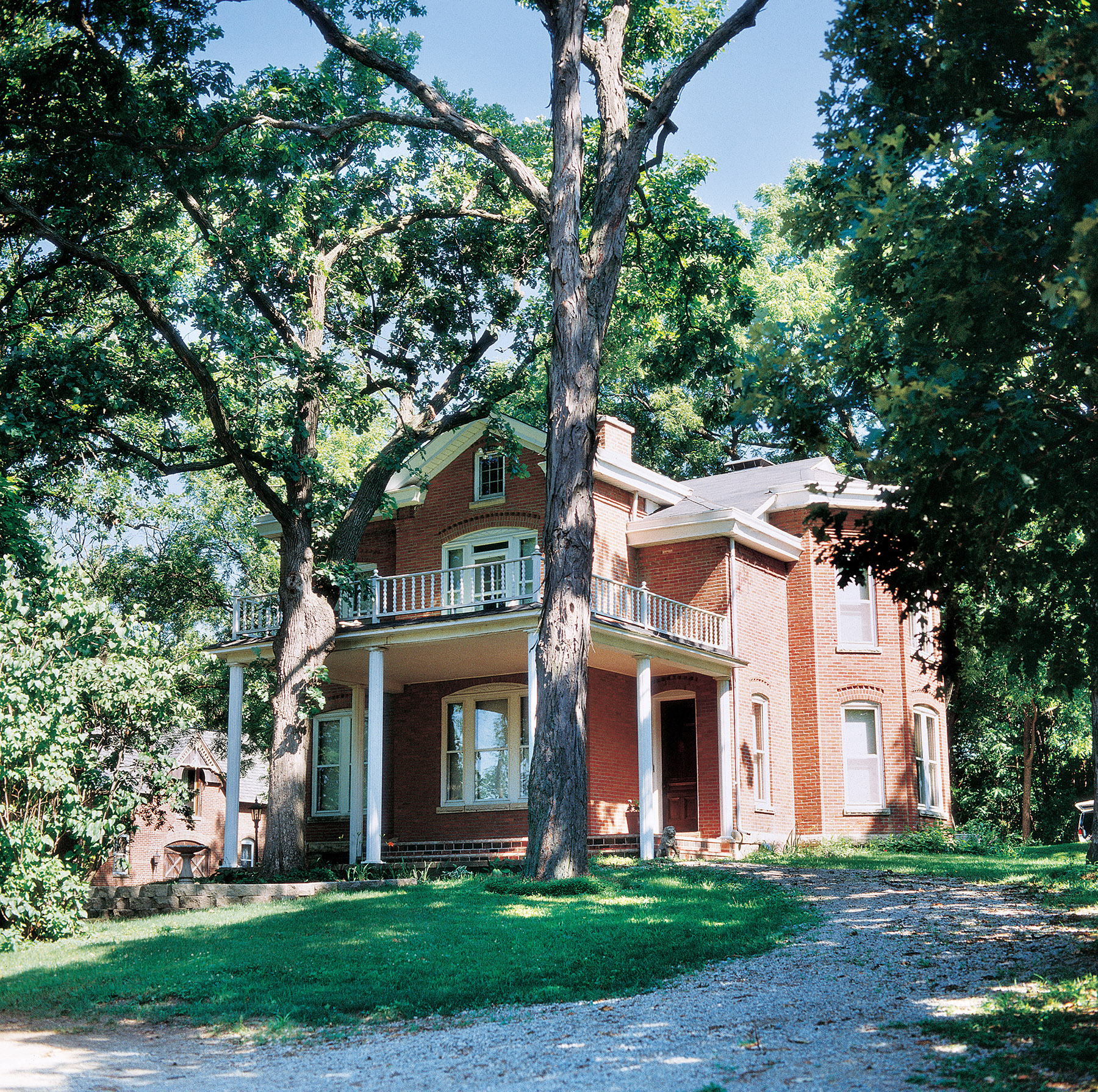

- Location within Iowa Location within the United States
- Location: 1420 Seminole Ave., NW; Cedar Rapids, Iowa
- Coordinates: 41°58′50.6″N 91°41′31.4″W
- Area: 1.2 acres (0.49 ha)
- Built: 1883
- Built by: Philip A. Wolff
- Architectural style: Italianate
- NRHP reference No.: 82000414
- Added to NRHP: October 7, 1982

The Philip A. Wolff House and Carriage House, also known as Belmont Hill, is a historic building located in Cedar Rapids, Iowa, United States. An Ohio native, Wolff lived in several states and the West Indies before settling in Maquoketa, Iowa. He moved to Cedar Rapids where he established a brickworks with his son. Wolff had this two-story vernacular Italianate house and accompanying carriage house built in 1883 with bricks made at his business, which was on the same grounds. At the time it was built, the house was located in a suburban area of Cedar Rapids. This was during a period of economic growth for the city. The house features paired brackets under the eaves, the windows have brick arches above and limestone sills, a three-sided, two-story bay, and a projecting center pavilion. The carriage house is architecturally similar to the main house. They were listed together on the National Register of Historic Places in 1982.
