= Cedar Valley Trail =

Rail trail in Iowa, US

Cedar Valley (Nature) Trail is a rail trail running 52 miles (84 km) from Hiawatha, Iowa to Waterloo, Iowa.

It runs through the counties of Linn, Benton, and Black Hawk. The southern 10 miles (16 km) as well as the northern 15 miles (24 km) of the trail are paved with asphalt, with the remainder being lined with crushed limestone.

Because locomotives required the route to be flat, at no point in the trail does the grade exceed 2%.

== Cities on the Trail ==
- Hiawatha
- Lafayette
- Center Point
- Urbana
- Brandon
- LaPorte City
- Gilbertville
- Evansdale

== Trail repair after 2008 flood ==
In 2013 the trail was again open for all 52 contiguous miles. Two bridges had been washed out in the Iowa Flood of 2008. The Cedar River bridge about seven miles west of Brandon was covered by flood waters, and the limestone surface was washed away. In June 2012 the Black Hawk County, Iowa Board of Supervisors voted to award a contract with Herberger Construction Co., of Indianola, Iowa to build the new Cedar River crossing. The new 700 foot span was opened in the spring of 2013.

== History ==
The path follows the route of the electric interurban Waterloo, Cedar Falls and Northern Railway which ran between Waterloo and Cedar Rapids until 1956. Illinois Central ran freight trains on the line until 1977 when it was abandoned and the tracks were removed. The Iowa state legislature and nonprofit organizations such as the Iowa Natural Heritage Foundation and the Federal Land and Water Conservation Fund raised the funds necessary to purchase the site by 1983. The following year, the trail opened to public traffic.

== See also ==
- List of rail trails
- List of rail trails in the United States
