= Polk Township, Benton County, Iowa =

Township in Iowa, US

Polk Township
- Township
- Location in Benton County
- Coordinates: 42°14′36″N 91°53′25″W
- Country: United States
- State: Iowa
- County: Benton

Area
  - Total: 46 sq mi (118 km^{2})
  - Land: 45.47 sq mi (117.76 km^{2})
  - Water: 0.093 sq mi (0.24 km^{2}) 0.2%
- Elevation: 869 ft (265 m)

Population (2000)
  - Total: 1,803
  - Density: 40/sq mi (15.3/km^{2})
- Time zone: UTC-6 (CST)
  - Summer (DST): UTC-5 (CDT)
- ZIP codes: 52213, 52345, 52349, 52352
- GNIS feature ID: 0468554

Polk Township is one of twenty townships in Benton County, Iowa, United States. As of the 2000 census, its population was 1,803.

== History ==
Polk Township was founded in 1848.

== Geography ==
According to the United States Census Bureau, Polk Township covers an area of 45.56 square miles (118 square kilometers); of this, 45.47 square miles (117.76 square kilometers, 99.8 percent) is land and 0.09 square miles (0.24 square kilometers, 0.2 percent) is water.

=== Cities, towns, villages ===
- Urbana

=== Unincorporated towns ===
- Cheney at 42.254159°N 91.927400°W
- Spencers Grove at 42.284436°N 91.869065°W

(This list is based on USGS data and may include former settlements.)

=== Extinct towns ===
- Manatheka at 42.227771°N 91.870455°W

(These towns are listed as "historical" by the USGS.)

=== Adjacent townships ===
- Homer Township, Buchanan County (north)
- Cono Township, Buchanan County (northeast)
- Grant Township, Linn County (east)
- Fayette Township, Linn County (southeast)
- Washington Township, Linn County (southeast)
- Benton Township (south)
- Taylor Township (southwest)
- Harrison Township (west)
- Jefferson Township, Buchanan County (northwest)

=== Cemeteries ===
The township contains these five cemeteries: Cox, Kisling, Saint Marys, Spencers Grove and Urbana.

=== Major highways ===
- Interstate 380
- Iowa Highway 150
- Iowa Highway 363
- Iowa Highway 920

== School districts ==
- Center Point–Urbana Community School District
- North Linn Community School District
- Vinton-Shellsburg Community School District

== Political districts ==
- Iowa's 3rd congressional district
- State House District 39
- State Senate District 20
