= Paris, Iowa =

- Unincorporated community
- Location within Iowa Location within the United States
- Country: United States
- State: Iowa
- County: Linn County
- Township: Jackson
- Time zone: UTC-6 (Central (CST))
  - Summer (DST): UTC-5 (CDT)

Paris is an unincorporated community in Linn County, Iowa, United States. It is located at the intersections of Sutton Road and County Highway D66 (Paris Road) near the banks of the Wapsipinicon River. It is northwest of Central City and southwest of Coggon, at 42.238459N, −91.578187W.

== History ==
The first white settlers in the area around Paris were the James Lytle family, in 1841. Paris was founded and staked out on the west side of the Wapsipinicon River, in sections 19 and 20 of Jackson Township, in 1845. A school was established just west of Paris in 1850.

The Upper Paris Bridge, which brings Sutton Road over the Wapsipinicon River, was built as a wagon bridge in 1879. It survives and is listed on the National Register of Historic Places. Paris is named after the capital in France.

The Iowa Exposition of 1889 was held in Paris.

== Notable person ==
Former United States Senator Richard C. Clark (1973–1979) was born in Paris in 1929. The population was 35 in 1940.
