= Upper Paris Bridge =

- U.S. National Register of Historic Places
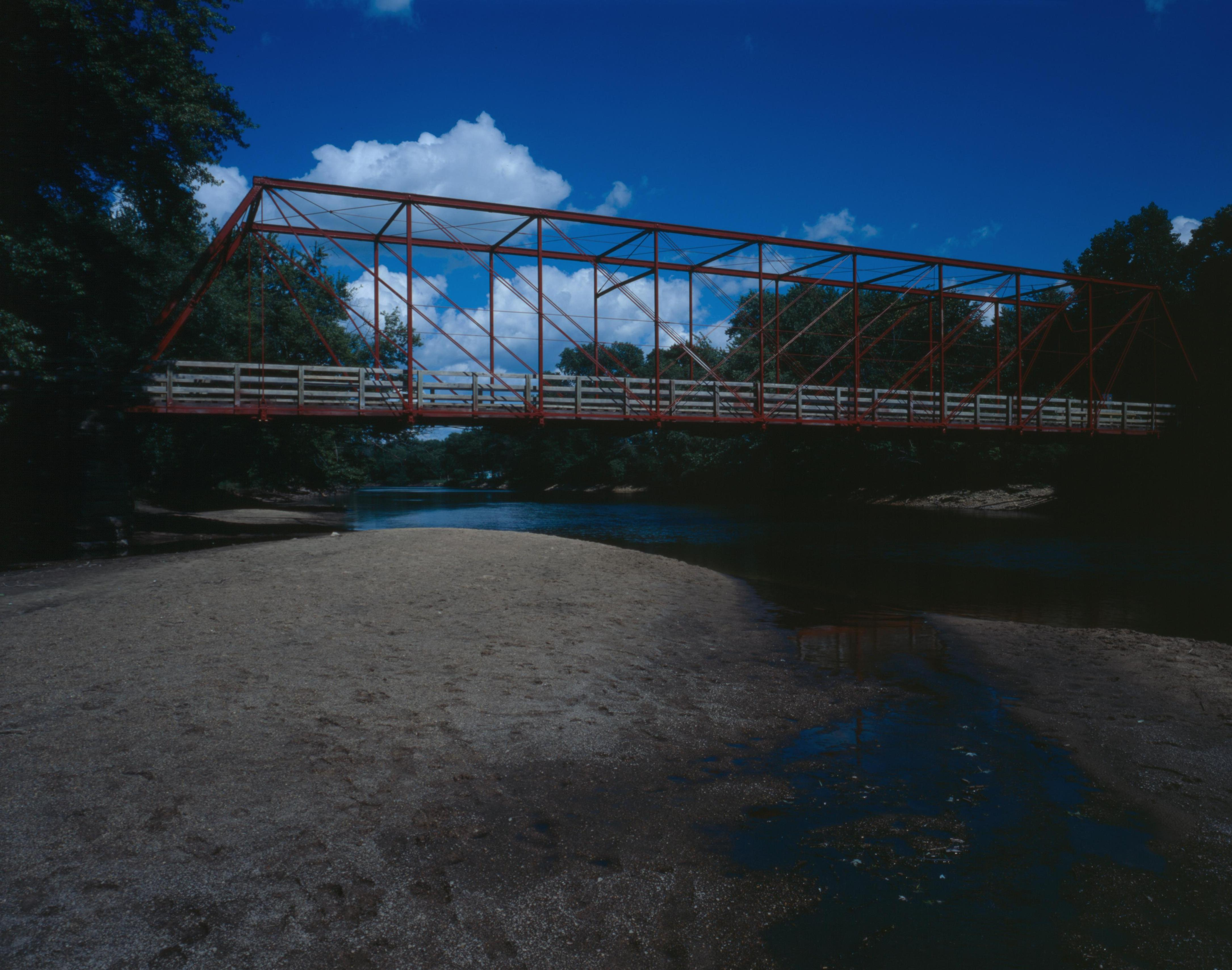

- Location within Iowa Location within the United States
- Location: Sutton Road over the Wapsipinicon River near Coggon
- Coordinates: 42°14′40″N 91°35′04″W
- Built: 1879
- Architect: Wrought Iron Bridge Company
- MPS: Highway Bridges of Iowa MPS
- NRHP reference No.: 98000532
- Added to NRHP: May 15, 1998

The Upper Paris Bridge is a historic structure located near the town of Coggon in rural Linn County, Iowa, United States. The pin-connected Whipple through truss bridge was built in 1879 as a wagon bridge. It was designed by the Wrought Iron Bridge Company of Canton, Ohio. The bridge was listed on the National Register of Historic Places in 1998 as a part of the Highway Bridges of Iowa MPS.

The bridge spans the Wapsipinicon River in the unincorporated community of Paris, Iowa. It has a single 160-foot (49 m) main span and timber stringer approach spans for a total length of 208-foot (63 m). It cost $4,964.72, to build, of which $3,000 was for the superstructure. Its superstructure is an 11-panel, pin-connected Whipple through truss.

The bridge is significant as a "rare example of a double-intersection Pratt truss," which is a kind of Whipple truss. Its diagonals extend over two panels, and are made of wrought iron, suited for their being under tension. The Whipple truss design was developed by engineer Squire Whipple in 1847.

As of 1994, it was the longest of only eight pin-connected Whipple through truss bridges surviving in Iowa. It then carried "intermittent" traffic in a setting largely unchanged since 1879.

== See also ==
- List of bridges documented by the Historic American Engineering Record in Iowa
