= WCF & N Center Point Depot and Substation =

- U.S. National Register of Historic Places
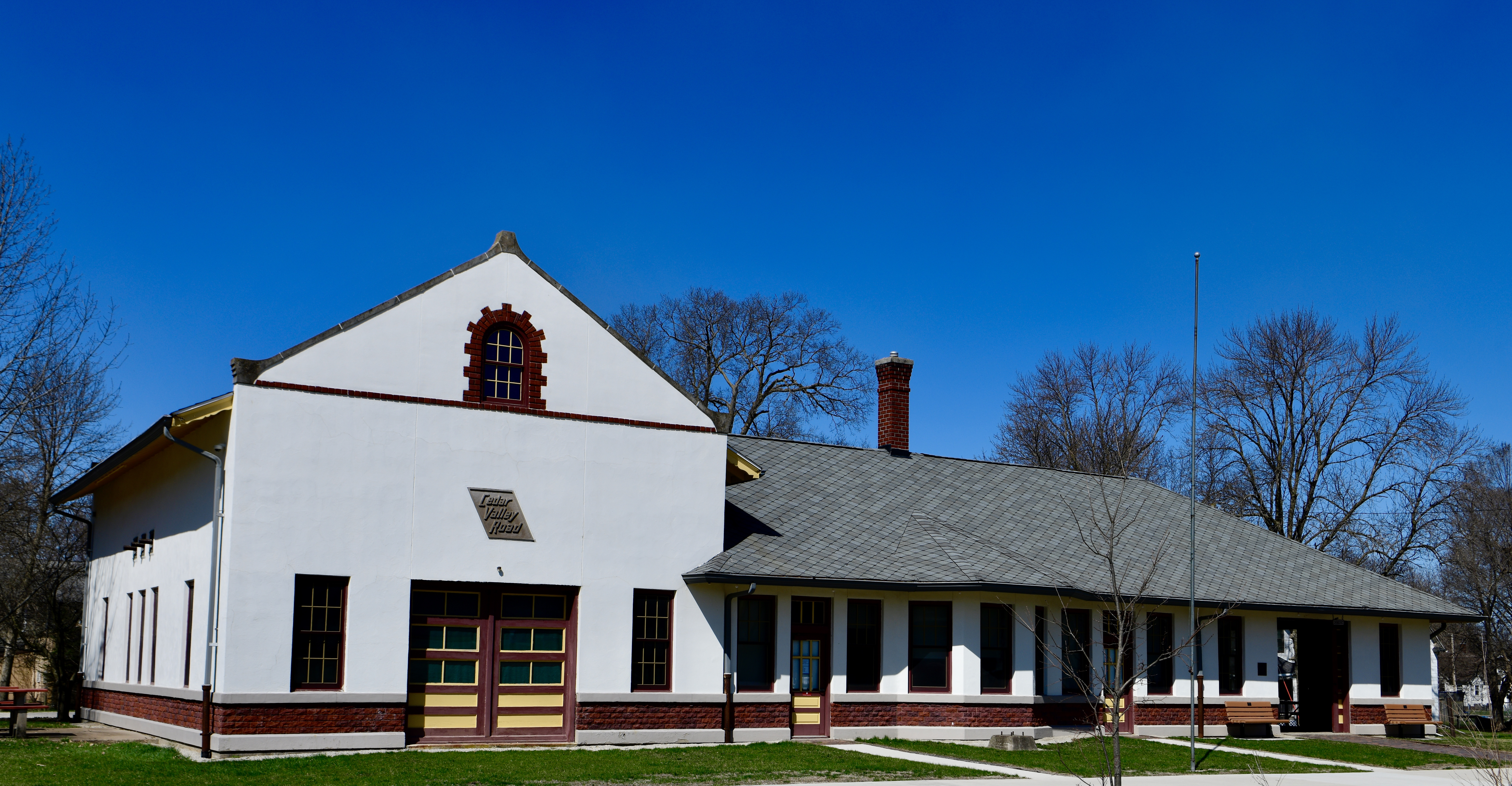

- Location within Iowa Location within the United States
- Location: 700 Washington St. Center Point, Iowa
- Coordinates: 42°11′33.7″N 91°46′53.3″W
- Area: less than one acre
- Built: 1914
- Architectural style: Mission Revival
- NRHP reference No.: 100002185
- Added to NRHP: March 7, 2018

The WCF & N Center Point Depot and Substation, also known as the Center Point Depot Museum, is a historic building located in Center Point, Iowa, United States. The Mission Revival building was constructed in 1914 by the Waterloo, Cedar Falls and Northern Railway, an interurban line that ran between the Waterloo – Cedar Falls area and Cedar Rapids. Passenger service ended here in 1956, and rail freight was discontinued in 1973. The station sat empty until it was renovated beginning in 1983. Other renovation projects were carried out 1998 to 1999 and 2013. The building was acquired by the Linn County Conservation Board in the early 1980s and turned into a museum and rest stop along the Cedar Valley Nature Trail, which follows the former rail bed. The building was listed on the National Register of Historic Places in 2018.
