= Waubeek, Iowa =

- Unincorporated community
- Location in Iowa Location in the United States
- Country: United States
- State: Iowa
- County: Linn
- Township: Buffalo
- Elevation: 837 ft (255 m)
- Time zone: UTC-6 (Central (CST))
  - Summer (DST): UTC-5 (CDT)
- Area code: 319
- GNIS feature ID: 462744

Waubeek is an unincorporated community in Linn County, Iowa, United States.

== Geography ==
It is located on the Wapsipinicon River on County Road X20 (Whittier Road) north of Whittier and southwest of Prairieburg, at 42.164779N, -91.462265W.

== History ==
An earlier town, named Paddington, was laid out adjacent and to the south of Waubeek in 1855. That area was included with Waubeek, when Waubeek was formally founded in either 1859, or 1855.

Waubeek's post office opened in 1858.

In 1911, Waubeek had four stores, a creamery, two churches, schools, and a post office. Waubeek had no railroad access.

In 1915, Waubeek's population was 210; in 1940, the population was 225.

The post office closed in 1960.

== See also ==
Lafayette, Iowa
