= Alburnett High School =

Public secondary school in Alburnett, Iowa, United States

Location
- 131 Roosevelt St; Alburnett, Iowa 52202; United States
- 42.1498°N 91.6193°W

Information
- School type: Public school (government funded), high school
- School district: Alburnett Community School District
- NCES District ID: 1903300
- Superintendent: Dani Trimble
- CEEB code: 160055
- NCES School ID: 190330000025
- Principal: Josh Henriksen
- Faculty: 18.73 (on an FTE basis)
- Grades: 7–12
- Enrollment: 278 (2023-2024)
- Student to teacher ratio: 14.84
- Campus type: Rural: Fringe
- Colors: Purple and Gold
- Athletics conference: Tri-Rivers Conference
- Mascot: Pirates
- Website: alburnettcsd.org/schools/alburnett-high-school/

Alburnett High School is a rural public high school located in Alburnett, Linn County, Iowa, United States, and is the only high school operated by the Alburnett Community School District. Total enrollment for the district is about 243 students as of the 2022-23 school year.

== Athletics ==
The Pirates participate in the Tri-Rivers Conference in the following sports:

- Football
- Cross Country
- Volleyball
- Basketball
- Wrestling
  - 3-time Class 1A State Champions (2013, 2015, 2016
  - 2-time Class 1A State Duals Champions (2013, 2016)
- Golf
- Track and Field
  - Girls' 2019 Class 1A State Champions
- Baseball
- Softball
  - 2-time Class 1A State Champions (1999, 2005)

== See also ==
- List of school districts in Iowa
