= Joseph and Clara Amanda H. Moorhead House =

Historic house in Iowa, United States

- U.S. National Register of Historic Places
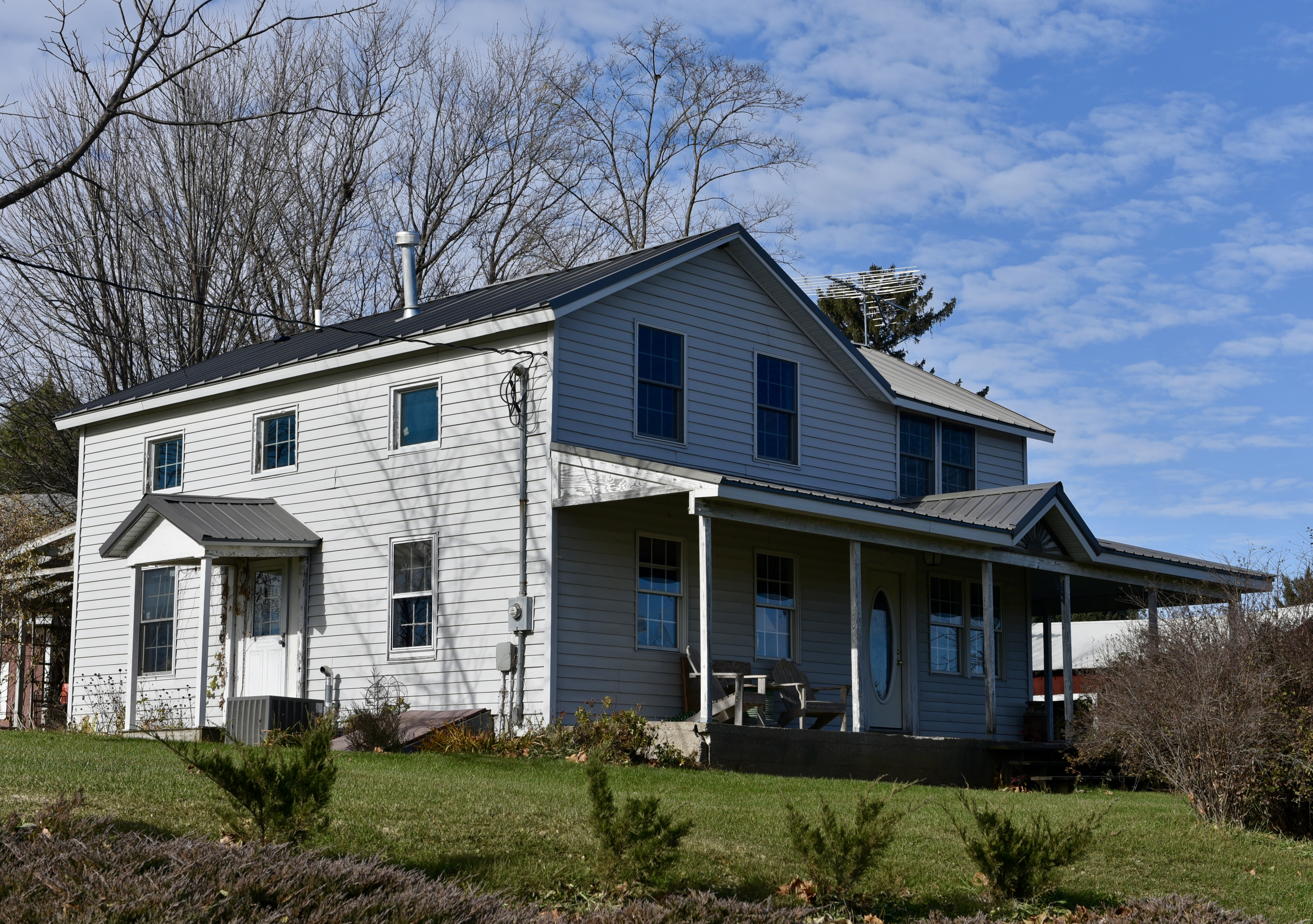

- Location within Iowa Location within the United States
- Location: 88 Palisades Access Rd. Ely, Iowa
- Coordinates: 41°51′59.7″N 91°32′8.2″W
- Area: 1.22 acres (0.49 ha)
- Built: 1859
- MPS: Early Settlement and Ethnic Properties of Linn County, Iowa MPS
- NRHP reference No.: 00001081
- Added to NRHP: September 14, 2000

The Joseph and Clara Amanda H. Moorhead House is a historic building located east of Ely, Iowa, United States. Joseph was a native of Holmes County, Ohio and Clara was from Chemung County, New York. They settled in Putnam Township in 1855 with their two sons. The Moorhead daughters were born in Iowa. The family initially lived in a log house before the original part of this house was built in 1859. The house is the only known residential example of heavy timber-frame construction that remains in Linn County from its settlement period. This construction method was more common in barn construction. The house was originally a rectangular two-story structure with side gables. Additions and a wrap-around porch were added in later years. Two barns associated with the farm, no longer extant, were located across the road.

The Moorheads lived here until 1881 when Joseph was elected the county auditor, and they moved into Marion. They retained ownership of the property until 1900. Clara died in Marion in 1901 and Joseph died two years later in Wichita, Kansas, where he lived with one of their daughters. They are buried nearby in the Rogers Grove Cemetery. The house was listed on the National Register of Historic Places in 2000.
