= Alice, Iowa =

- unincorporated community
- Location within Iowa
- Coordinates: 42°11′51″N 91°41′44″W
- Country: United States
- State: Iowa
- Elevation: 866 ft (264 m)
- Time zone: UTC-6 (Central (CST))
  - Summer (DST): UTC-5 (CDT)
- GNIS feature ID: 464440

Alice is an unincorporated community in Linn County, in the U.S. state of Iowa.

== Geography ==
Alice is in Otter Creek Township, south of Troy Mills, at the corners of sections 5, 6, 7, and 8. Alice lies at the junction of County Highway E16 and Alice Road.

== History ==
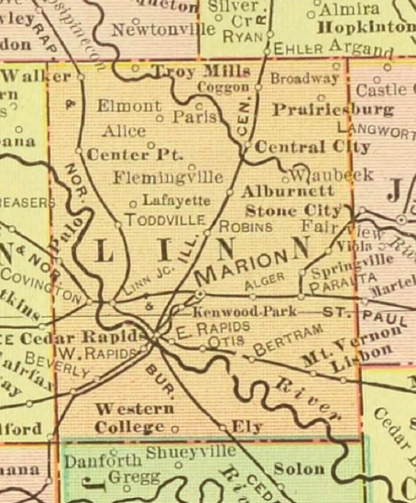
A map of Alice in the northern part o Linn County in 1902

The Alice post office was established in 1892.

The community's population was 16 in 1900, and 35 in 1920. The community's population declined to 5 in 1940.

The Alice post office was discontinued in 1902.

On July 11, 2025, the community was struck by EF2 tornado, which caused heavy damage to homesteads in and near the small town.

== See also ==
- Paris, Iowa
