= Jay G. Sigmund =

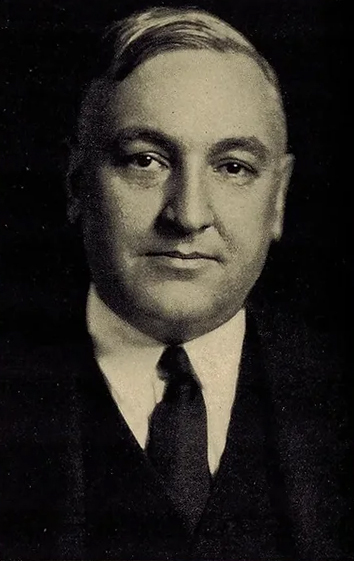

Jay G. Sigmund (1885–1937) was an American regionalist author, naturalist, and executive from Waubeek, Iowa. He was a close friend of the painter Grant Wood, author Paul Engle, and had ties to many regionalist intellectuals of his time. He published 10 books of poetry and short stories during his life.

== Biography ==
Jay Sigmund was born on a tenant farm in 1885 near Waubeek, Iowa. He grew up farming and exploring the Wapsipinicon River Valley. Sigmund developed an interest in natural history early in his life and collected indigenous pottery, arrowheads, and geological specimens from a young age. He attended a one room schoolhouse in rural Iowa. The Sigmund family left their farm in 1895 and moved into the village of Waubeek.

As a teenager, he moved away from his parents to nearby Cedar Rapids to work as a grocer. He started writing during this time. He was hired as a salesman for the Cedar Rapids Life Insurance Company in 1907, where he quickly excelled and gained a financial grounding. By 1924, he was promoted to vice president and agency manager for the company.

Sigmund developed a friendship with Grant Wood, as well as other artists and authors who lived or passed through Cedar Rapids, in the 1920s. Some credit Sigmund with convincing Wood to paint subjects from his native surroundings in Iowa rather than imitating French impressionism. Sigmund served on the Cedar Rapids Public Library board and was instrumental in the founding of the Cedar Rapids Museum of Art. He often spent periods of time in Waubeek, keeping a cabin in the village. He invited his friends from Cedar Rapids, including Grant Wood and Marvin Cone, to Waubeek for visits. Paul Engle was his paperboy and Sigmund introduced Engle to poetry at a young age. Engle would go on to found the influential Iowa Writers’ Workshop.

Sigmund died on October 19, 1937, from a hunting accident near the Wapsipinicon River. He left a will that made Paul Engle literary executor of his unpublished works.

== Publications ==
- Frescoes (Boston, 1922) OCLC 3486064
- Pinions (New York, 1923) OCLC 3486052
- Land O’Maize Folk (New York, 1924) OCLC 1166923469
- Drowsy Ones (Cedar Rapids, 1925) OCLC 10096458
- Wapsipinicon Tales (Cedar Rapids, 1927) OCLC 10320345
- Merged Blood (Des Moines, 1929) OCLC 3894922
- The Ridge Road (Cedar Rapids, 1930) OCLC 1920192
- Burroak and Sumac (Mount Vernon, 1935) OCLC 21107415
- The Least of These (Muscatine, 1935) OCLC 5537675
- Heron at Sunset (Mount Vernon, 1937) OCLC 5694439
