= Waterloo, Cedar Falls and Northern Railway =

Former interurban railway in Iowa

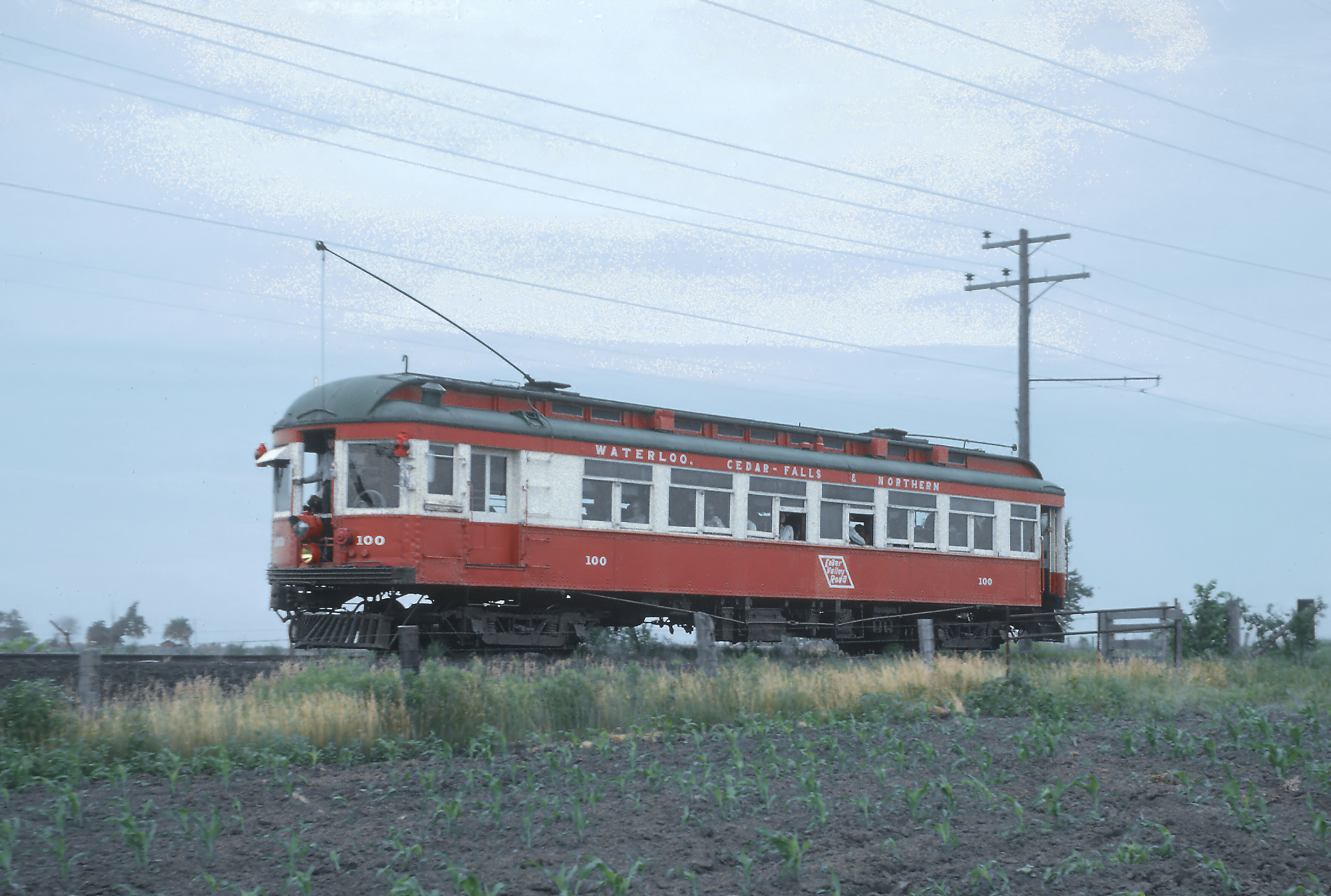
- A surviving former WCF&N interurban car

Overview
- Headquarters: Waterloo, Iowa
- Locale: Iowa
- Dates of operation: 1896–1958

Technical
- Track gauge: 4 ft 8 1/2 in (1,435 mm) standard gauge
- Electrification: Overhead line, 650V and 1300V DC, abandoned 1957-1958

The Waterloo, Cedar Falls and Northern Railway (WCF&N) was an electric interurban railway that operated in the US state of Iowa.

== History ==
The Waterloo and Cedar Falls Rapid Transit was organized in 1895 to build an 8-mile line from Waterloo to nearby Cedar Falls, Iowa, which it completed in 1897. In 1904 the company renamed itself Waterloo, Cedar Falls and Northern Railway and began expanding outward, completing a 22-mile line from Waterloo north to Waverly in 1910 and a 60-mile line south to Cedar Rapids, where connection was made with the Cedar Rapids & Iowa City interurban, in 1914. In the 1920s it operated eight passenger trains per weekday to Cedar Rapids, four to Waverly, and every half hour from Waterloo to Cedar Falls. It also operated a belt line for freight trains around Waterloo, as well as local streetcar service in Waterloo (1896-1939) and Cedar Falls (1898-1941). Passenger service to Waverly ended in 1955, to Cedar Rapids in 1956, and to Cedar Falls in 1958, making it the last interurban west of Chicago and east of California.

In 1956 the railway was jointly purchased by the Illinois Central and Rock Island railroads, who renamed it Waterloo Railroad and converted its freight operations to diesel power. Illinois Central became sole owner in 1968 and abandoned most of the Waterloo Railroad in the 1970s.

== Current status ==
A section of former WCF&N track near Waterloo remains in use for freight service by Illinois Central's successor Canadian National. Since the 1980s most of the right-of-way between Waterloo and Cedar Rapids has been used for the Cedar Valley Nature Trail. The former depot in Center Point (on the Waterloo-Cedar Rapids line) is used as a museum and rest stop.
