= Wickiup Hill =

Native American archeological region near Toddville, Iowa

- Location within Iowa
- Location: Iowa, United States
- Coordinates: 42.083°N 91.765°W
- Area: 790 acres (320 ha)
- Governing body: Linn County Conservation Department
- Wickiup Hill
- U.S. National Register of Historic Places
- Location: Address restricted
- MPS: Archaeology of the Wickiup Hill Locality in Linn County, Iowa MPS
- NRHP reference No.: 100007332
- Added to NRHP: January 20, 2022

Wickiup Hill is a Native American archeological region near Toddville, in Linn County, Iowa. The area has the Wickiup Hill Outdoor Learning Center which was built where a Meskwaki village once stood. Wickiup Hill has been excavated by archeologists.

== History ==
Wickiup Hill has been occupied by people for around 8,000 years and has archeological evidence of Native American villages as well as of their burial grounds. Its burial grounds are under protection by Iowa law and are not documented for others to find. The mounds were stolen from repeatedly and no one knows what remains of their contents. The Oneota, Ioway, and Meskwaki people used to live in the area. Starting in 1994, multiple surveys and excavations were completed by archeologists to record its historical sites. People helped contribute to the effort by volunteering through field schools, teacher workshops, and camps for student archeologists. More than 20 historical sites were discovered within river terraces, sand dunes, bluffs, and ridge-tops. The excavations include 5,000-year-old campgrounds, clusters of mounds, and late 19th-century pioneer cabins. Items that were discovered include a blue glass bead, metal, buttons, ceramics, two 1865 Indian Head cents, and one 1868 Indian Head cent. Other discoveries were intact charred wooden boards that might have come from a cabin and an oval basin that had slabs of dolomite and other rocks. The basin and rocks may have come from a sweat lodge that was used by Native Americans.

A nomination for Wickiup Hill to be placed on the National Register of Historic Places (NRHP) was started in 2020. It was established as a Multiple Property Submission called the Archaeology of the Wickiup Hill Locality in Linn County, Iowa. The area was divided into six separate areas that were individually listed on the NRHP on January 20, 2022. The six areas are: Wickiup Hill Late Woodland Village Site, Wickiup Hill Middle to Late Archaic Camp Site, Wickiup Hill Mound Group No. 1, Wickiup Hill Mound Group No. 2, Wickiup Hill Mound Group No. 3, and Wickiup Hill Mound Group No. 4. The listings mean the area could be eligible to receive more state and federal grants.

== Nature center ==
The Wickiup Hill Outdoor Learning Center is a 790-acre (320 ha) nature center on Cedar River's left bank in Linn County and it is controlled by the Linn County Conservation Department. The nature center has exhibits, tours, and events. It was built on a Meskwaki village site. In 2021, the nature center held two snowshoe hiking events.
