= Central City High School =

Central City High School may refer to:

- Central City High School (Iowa) in Central City, Iowa
- Central City High School (Kentucky), in Central City, Kentucky (now closed)
- Central City High School (Nebraska) in Central City, Nebraska
