= Central City Historic District =

Central City Historic District may refer to:

- Central City-Black Hawk Historic District, Central City, CO, listed on the NRHP in Colorado
- Central City Commercial Historic District, Central City, IA, listed on the NRHP in Iowa
- Central City, New Orleans, which includes a Central City Historic District listed on the NRHP in Louisiana
- Saginaw Central City Expansion District, Saginaw, MI, listed on the NRHP in Michigan
- Saginaw Central City Historic Residential District, Saginaw, MI, listed on the NRHP in Michigan
- West Point Central City Historic District, West Point, MS, listed on the NRHP in Mississippi
- Rocky Mount Central City Historic District, Rocky Mount, NC, listed on the NRHP in North Carolina
- Central City Historic District (Salt Lake City, Utah), listed on the NRHP in Utah
