= Fairfax Township =

Fairfax Township may refer to the following townships in the United States:

- Fairfax Township, Linn County, Iowa
- Fairfax Township, Polk County, Minnesota
