= Whittier, Iowa =

- Unincorporated community
- Location in Iowa Location in the United States
- Country: United States
- State: Iowa
- County: Linn
- Township: Brown
- Elevation: 915 ft (279 m)
- Time zone: UTC-6 (Central (CST))
  - Summer (DST): UTC-5 (CDT)
- Area code: 319
- GNIS feature ID: 463015

Whittier is an unincorporated community in Linn County, Iowa, United States.

== Geography ==
Whittier is located at the intersections of County Roads X20 and E34 south of Waubeek and west of Viola, at 42.092976N, -91.462973W.

== History ==
Whittier was founded as a Quaker community. Originally known as Quaker Corners, the community was founded in Brown Township.

The original meetinghouse in Whittier was constructed in 1864, and this building also served as a schoolhouse until 1878. The replacement building, the Whittier Friends Meeting House, was built directly in front of the original building, and was constructed in 1893. It is listed on the National Register of Historic Places.

A schoolhouse was built in 1878. In 1893, a general store was opened by the Hall family, who also operated the post office. The village was renamed to Whittier in honor of the Quaker poet and abolitionist John Greenleaf Whittier.

Whittier's population was 28 in 1902, In 1918, a community hall was built in Whittier.

The population was 100 in 1940. The Quaker school and the post office and the post office closed in the 1950s.

In 2008, the Linn County Planning and Development Commission announced a planning document to guide the development of Whittier; this plan included limited growth, including acknowledgement and reflection of the community's Quaker heritage.

== See also ==
- West Branch, Iowa, another Quaker community
