= Central City Community School District =

Public school district in Central City, Iowa, United States

Coordinates: 42.208747°N 91.525224°W

Location
- Central City, Iowa Linn County United States
- Coordinates: 42.208747, -91.525224

District information
- Type: Local school district
- Motto: never give up, never surrender, GO WILDCATS!
- Grades: K-12
- Established: 2007
- Superintendent: Lisa Glenn
- Schools: 1(combined)
- Budget: $7,775,000 (2020-21)
- NCES District ID: 1906780

Students and staff
- Students: 451 (2022-23)
- Teachers: 37.19 FTE
- Staff: 33.80 FTE
- Student–teacher ratio: 12.13
- Athletic conference: Tri-Rivers
- District mascot: Wildcat
- Colors: Red and Black

Other information
- Website: centralcitycsd.org

The Central City Community School District is a rural public school district headquartered in Central City, Iowa.

The district is completely within Linn County, and serves Central City, Prairieburg, and the surrounding rural areas.

Tim Cronin has served as superintendent since 2013, and in 2019, started a shared role with Dunkerton Community School District.

Lisa Glenn has served as superintendent since 2025 and counting, and also has a shared role with North Linn Community School District.

== Schools ==
The district operates two schools, in one facility in Central City:

- Central City Elementary School
- Central City High School

=== Central City High School ===
==== Athletics ====
The Wildcats participate in the Tri-Rivers Conference in the following sports:

- Football
- Cross Country
- Volleyball
- Basketball
- Wrestling
  - 1922 State Champions
- Golf
- Track and Field
- Little League Soccer
- Baseball
  - 1956 State Champions
- Softball

== See also ==
- List of school districts in Iowa
- List of high schools in Iowa
