= Lafayette, Iowa =

- unincorporated community
- Location within Iowa
- Coordinates: 42°08′49″N 91°40′49″W
- Country: United States
- State: Iowa
- Elevation: 902 ft (275 m)
- Time zone: UTC-6 (Central (CST))
  - Summer (DST): UTC-5 (CDT)
- GNIS feature ID: 458170

Lafayette or La Fayette is an unincorporated community in Linn County, in the U.S. state of Iowa. It is located in Otter Creek Township.

The community was founded in the mid-1800s, and was once the home to a number of mills and a coal mine.

A post office operated in the community from 1891 to 1902. The Lafayette Christian Church and the Lafayette Salem Evangelical Church still operate in Lafayette, with the Lafayette Salem church operating for well over 100 years in the community.

== Geography ==
LaFayette is 10 miles (16 km) from the Linn County seat, Cedar Rapids. It is in Otter Creek Township.

== History ==
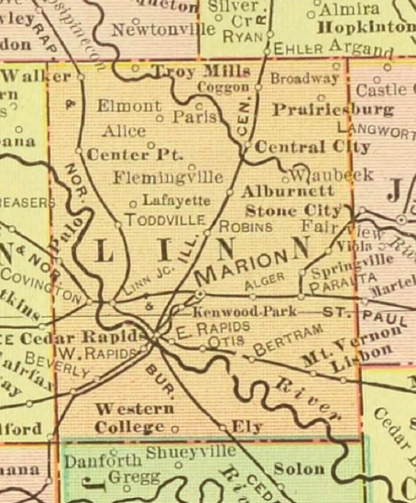
A map of Lafayette in the north central part of Linn County in 1902

In 1845, settler John Nevins built a sawmill in what later became the village of Lafayette. This mill was later passed down to new owners John Lambert, James Greene, and A. Brenaman, then Fred Notebahn. Notebahn added a grist mill.

By 1856, Lafayette was listed as a town in N.H. Parker's Handbook of Iowa. In 1871, a coal deposit was discovered near Lafayette; a mining company was established, but proved unprofitable, with the shafts flooded with water and the coal deposit "not exceeding an inch in thickness".

The Lafayette post office was established in 1891.

The community's population was 50 in 1890, 53 in 1900, and 52 in 1920.

The Lafayette post office was discontinued in 1902.

The community's population was 50 in 1940.

Lafayette is home to the Lafayette Christian Church and the Lafayette Salem Evangelical Church, the latter of which celebrated its centennial around 2001.

== See also ==
- Whittier, Iowa
