= Toddville, Iowa =

- Unincorporated community
- Location in Iowa Location in the United States
- Coordinates: 42°5′57″N 91°43′1″W
- Country: United States
- State: Iowa
- County: Linn
- Township: Monroe
- Elevation: 787 ft (240 m)
- Time zone: UTC-6 (Central (CST))
  - Summer (DST): UTC-5 (CDT)
- ZIP codes: 52341
- GNIS feature ID: 462268

Toddville is an unincorporated community in western Linn County, Iowa, United States. It lies along local roads just off I-380, northwest of the city of Cedar Rapids, the county seat of Linn County. Its elevation is 787 feet (240 m).

== History ==
Toddville was founded in the 1800s and had a population of 57 in 1902. The population was 150 in 1940.

Although Toddville is unincorporated, it had a post office, with the ZIP code of 52341, until its closing in the mid-1990s.

Toddville is also the home of a school building which was formerly a part of the Alburnett Community School District. This building, built in 1923, once housed a portion of the district's kindergarten through fourth grade students. The school began exporting students to nearby, and larger, Alburnett elementary in 1988, and was voted to be closed in 1999. The former school building is now private residential property.

== Demographics ==
The 2010 government census was 1,093 people. There were 550 males and 543 females.

== Organizations ==
There is the American Legion Toddville Post 674, which is an active non-profit organization in the community. Every Memorial Day the Post provides a memorial service in three locations in Toddville, one of the locations being at Grasshopper Bridge.

== Economy ==
There are currently 25 verified businesses. These include two churches, the Monroe Township Fire Station, and businesses in the trades. One of the local Toddville businesses is Bickal Koi Farm who breeds and sells Japanese Koi Fish.

== Parks and Recreation ==
Wickiup Hill Natural Area is where the Wickiup Outdoor Learning Area and Wickiup Wandering Woods. This is an outdoor and indoor interactive recreation and learning area. It is a park and a place to learn about the indigenous nature and people in the area. The Linn County Conservation and Linn County Parks offices are also located in the same facility.
