= Bertram Township, Linn County, Iowa =

Township in Linn County, Iowa, U.S.

Coordinates: 41.9564°N 91.5372°W

Bertram Township is a township in Linn County, Iowa.

== History ==
Bertram Township was organized in 1858.
