= Robert Kirkpatrick Round Barn =

- U.S. National Register of Historic Places
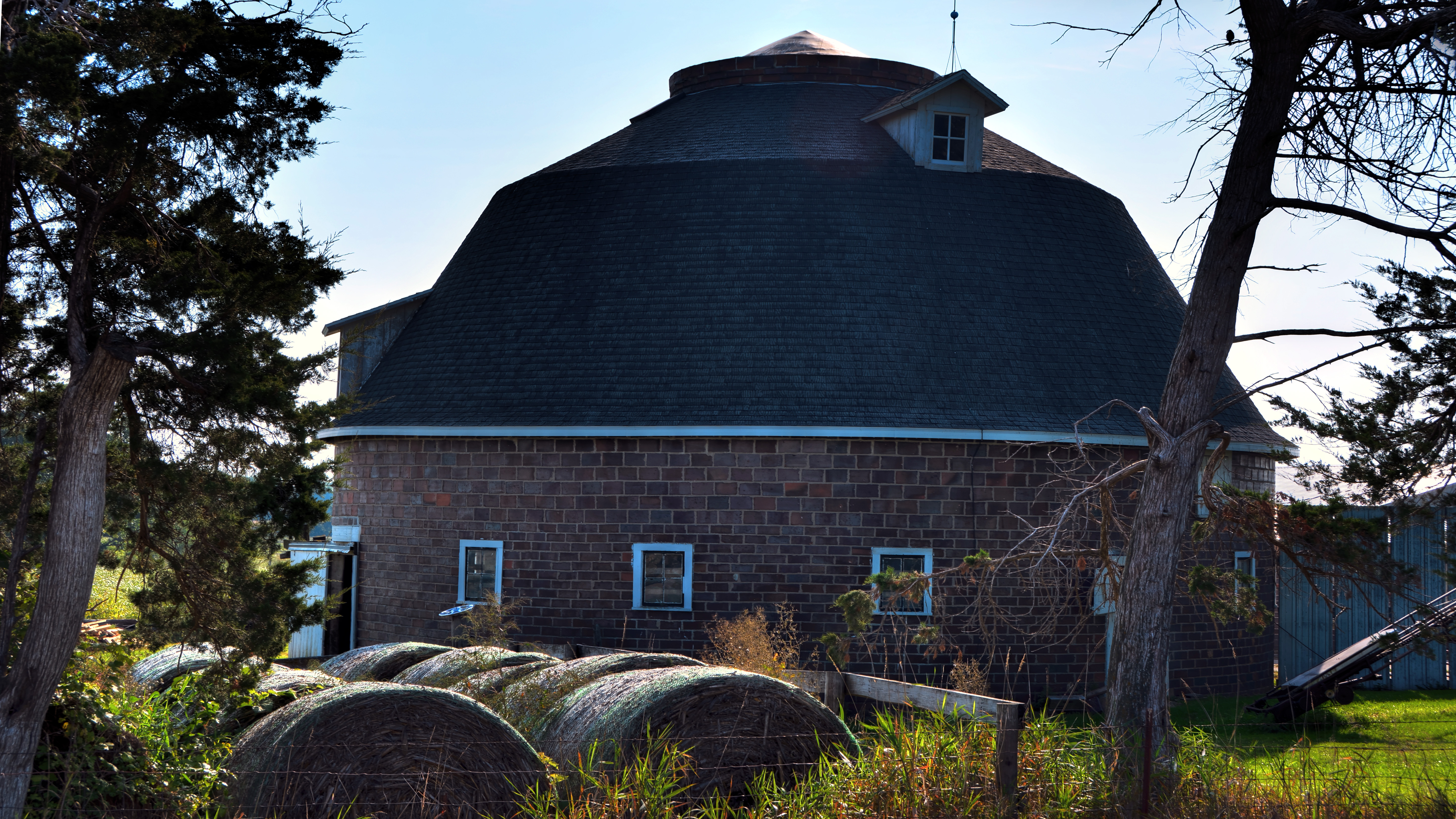

- Location within Iowa Location within the United States
- Location: 3342-120th Ave.
- Nearest city: Coggon, Iowa
- Coordinates: 42°17′55″N 91°33′29″W
- Area: less than one acre
- Built: 1919
- Built by: Robert Kirkpatrick
- MPS: Iowa Round Barns: The Sixty Year Experiment TR
- NRHP reference No.: 05000252
- Added to NRHP: April 6, 2005

The Robert Kirkpatrick Round Barn is a historic building located near Coggon in rural Delaware County, Iowa, United States. It was built in 1919 by Robert Kirkpatrick on his own farm. The building is a true round barn that measures 60 feet (18 m) in diameter. The barn is constructed of clay tiles and features a two-pitch roof with a large hay dormer on the east side and two smaller dormers on the west and north. It is one of 16 clay tile barns that were based on a design from the Johnson Brothers Clay Works in Fort Dodge, Iowa. The use of hollow clay tile is a distinctive trait in the construction of Iowa's round barns. For many years it was used as a dairy barn before becoming a horse barn. It has been listed on the National Register of Historic Places since 2005.
