= Maine Township, Linn County, Iowa =

Township in Linn County, Iowa, U.S.

Coordinates: 42.1711°N 91.5411°W

Maine Township is a township in Linn County, Iowa.

== History ==
Maine Township was organized in 1848.
