= Viola, Iowa =

- Unincorporated community
- Location in Iowa Location in the United States
- Coordinates: 42°5′27″N 91°26′16″W
- Country: United States
- State: Iowa
- County: Linn
- Township: Brown
- Elevation: 978 ft (298 m)
- Time zone: UTC-6 (Central (CST))
  - Summer (DST): UTC-5 (CDT)
- ZIP codes: 52350
- GNIS feature ID: 462581

Viola is an unincorporated community in eastern Linn County, Iowa, United States. It lies along local roads, northeast of the city of Cedar Rapids, the county seat of Linn County. Its elevation is 978 feet (298 m). Although Viola is unincorporated, it has a post office, with the ZIP code of 52350, which opened on 7 October 1861.

== History ==
Viola was laid out in 1861 within Brown Township. It was named for Miss Viola Leonard, daughter of a landowner. The population was 150 in 1940.

== Education ==
Anamosa Community School District operates local area public schools.
