= College Township, Linn County, Iowa =

Township in Iowa, United States

Coordinates: 41.8814°N 91.6272°W

College Township is a township in Linn County, Iowa, United States.

== History ==
College Township was organized in 1858.
