= Marion Township, Linn County, Iowa =

Township in Linn County, Iowa, U.S.

Coordinates: 42.0611°N 91.5664°W

Marion Township is a township in Linn County, Iowa.

== History ==
Marion Township was organized in 1841.
