= Spring Grove Township, Linn County, Iowa =

Township in Linn County, Iowa, U.S.

Coordinates: 42.2544°N 91.6497°W

Spring Grove Township is a township in Linn County, Iowa.

== History ==
Spring Grove Township was organized in 1853.
