= Linn Township, Linn County, Iowa =

Township in Linn County, Iowa, U.S.

Coordinates: 41.9911°N 91.4239°W

Linn Township is a township in Linn County, Iowa.

== History ==
Linn Township was organized in 1843.
