= Alburnett Community School District =

Public school district in Alburnett, Iowa, United States

Coordinates: 42.150164°N 91.619414°W

Location
- Alburnett, Iowa Linn County United States
- Coordinates: 42.150164, -91.619414

District information
- Type: Local school district
- Grades: K-12
- Superintendent: John Zimmerman
- Schools: 3
- Budget: $10,325,000 (2020-21)
- NCES District ID: 1903300

Students and staff
- Students: 810 (2022-23)
- Teachers: 58.98 FTE
- Staff: 49.14 FTE
- Student–teacher ratio: 13.73
- Athletic conference: River Valley Conference
- District mascot: Pirates
- Colors: Purple and Gold

Other information
- Website: alburnettcsd.org

The Alburnett Community School District is a rural public school district headquartered in Alburnett, Iowa.

The district is completely within Linn County, and serves Alburnett, Hiawatha and the surrounding rural areas.

== Schools ==
The district operates three schools in one facility in Alburnett:

- Alburnett Elementary School
- Alburnett Middle School
- Alburnett High School

== See also ==
- List of school districts in Iowa
