= Whittier Friends Meeting House =

Quaker meeting house built in the 19th century in Iowa

- U.S. National Register of Historic Places
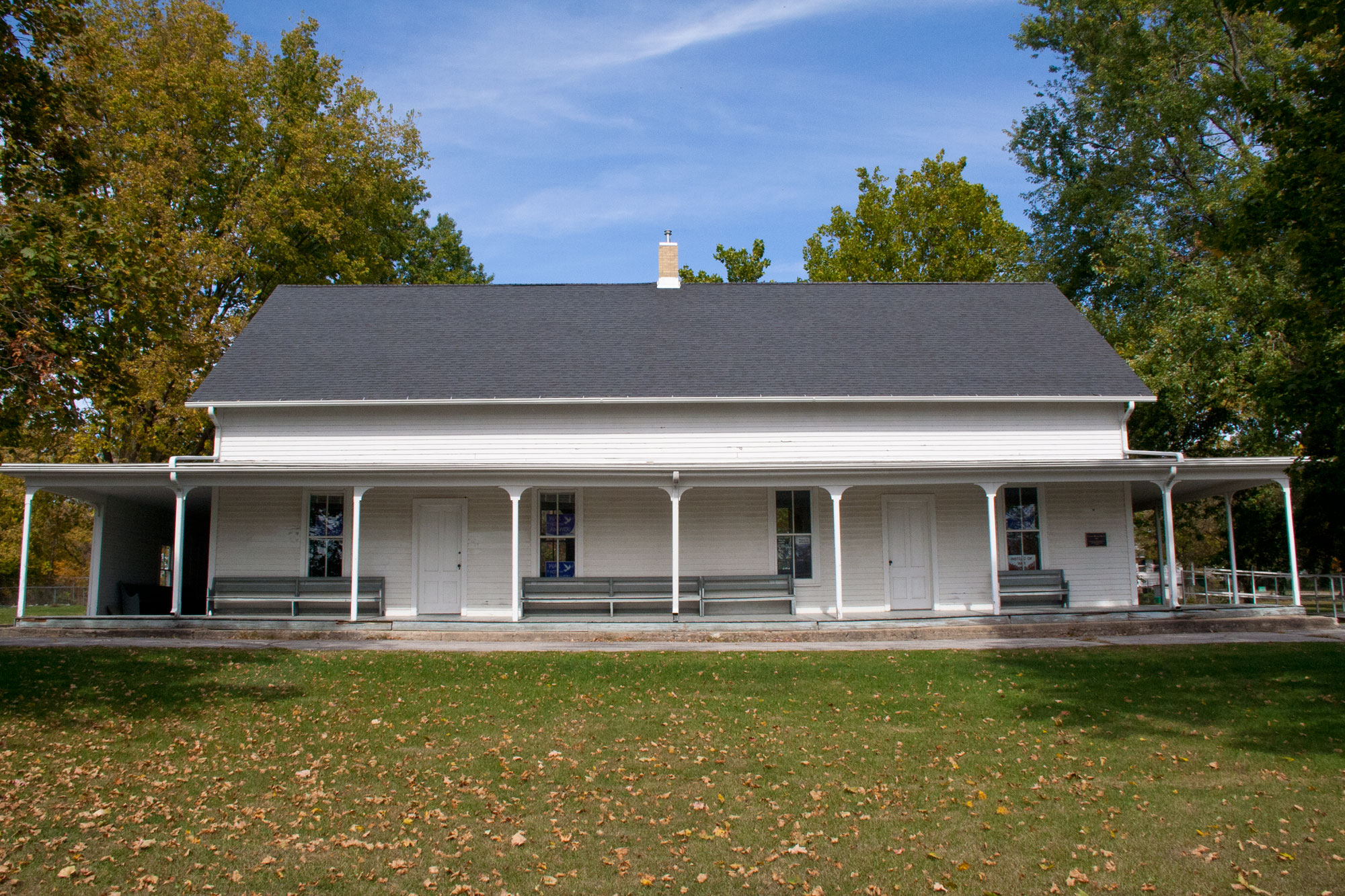

- Location within Iowa Location within the United States
- Location: Jct. of Co. Rds. E34 and X20, Whittier, Iowa
- Coordinates: 42.093056°N 91.463889°W
- Area: 2 acres (0.81 ha)
- Built: 1893
- Architect: Hoyle, William
- NRHP reference No.: 93000653
- Added to NRHP: July 29, 1993

Whittier Friends Meeting House (also known as Springville Friends Meeting House; Quaker Corners) is a historic church building at the junction of County Roads E34 and X20 in Whittier, Iowa. It was built in 1893.

It was added to the National Register of Historic Places in 1993. It was deemed significant in the areas of religion and architecture. The National Register nomination noted:

The building reflects the religious and architectural heritage of a small but locally significant religious group, the Conservative Wilburite Friends of Iowa. The building embodies their conception of right building, which maintained a predilection for unadorned simplicity. The meeting house meets the requirements of Criteria consideration A for significant religious properties. It is a tangible reflection of the broad patterns of Midwestern religious development. The Whittier Friends cemetery is immediately adjacent the meeting house and is included as a contributing element to the nomination.
