= Grant Township, Linn County, Iowa =

Township in Linn County, Iowa, U.S.

Coordinates: 42.2514°N 91.7581°W

Grant Township is a township in Linn County, Iowa.

== History ==
Grant Township was organized in 1872.
