= Jackson Township, Linn County, Iowa =

Township in Linn County, Iowa, U.S.

Coordinates: 42°15′30″N 91°32′08″W

Jackson Township is a township in Linn County, Iowa, organized in 1855. It was probably named by an early settler who was an admirer of President Andrew Jackson.
