= Buffalo Township, Linn County, Iowa =

Township in Linn County, Iowa, U.S.

Coordinates: 42.1633°N 91.4278°W

Buffalo Township is a township in Linn County, Iowa.

== History ==
Buffalo Township was organized in 1848.
