= Fairfax Township, Linn County, Iowa =

Township in Linn County, Iowa, U.S.

Coordinates: 41.8981°N 91.7794°W

Fairfax Township is a township in Linn County, Iowa.

== History ==
Fairfax Township was organized in 1858.
