= Central City Commercial Historic District =

Historic district in Iowa, United States

- U.S. National Register of Historic Places
- U.S. Historic district
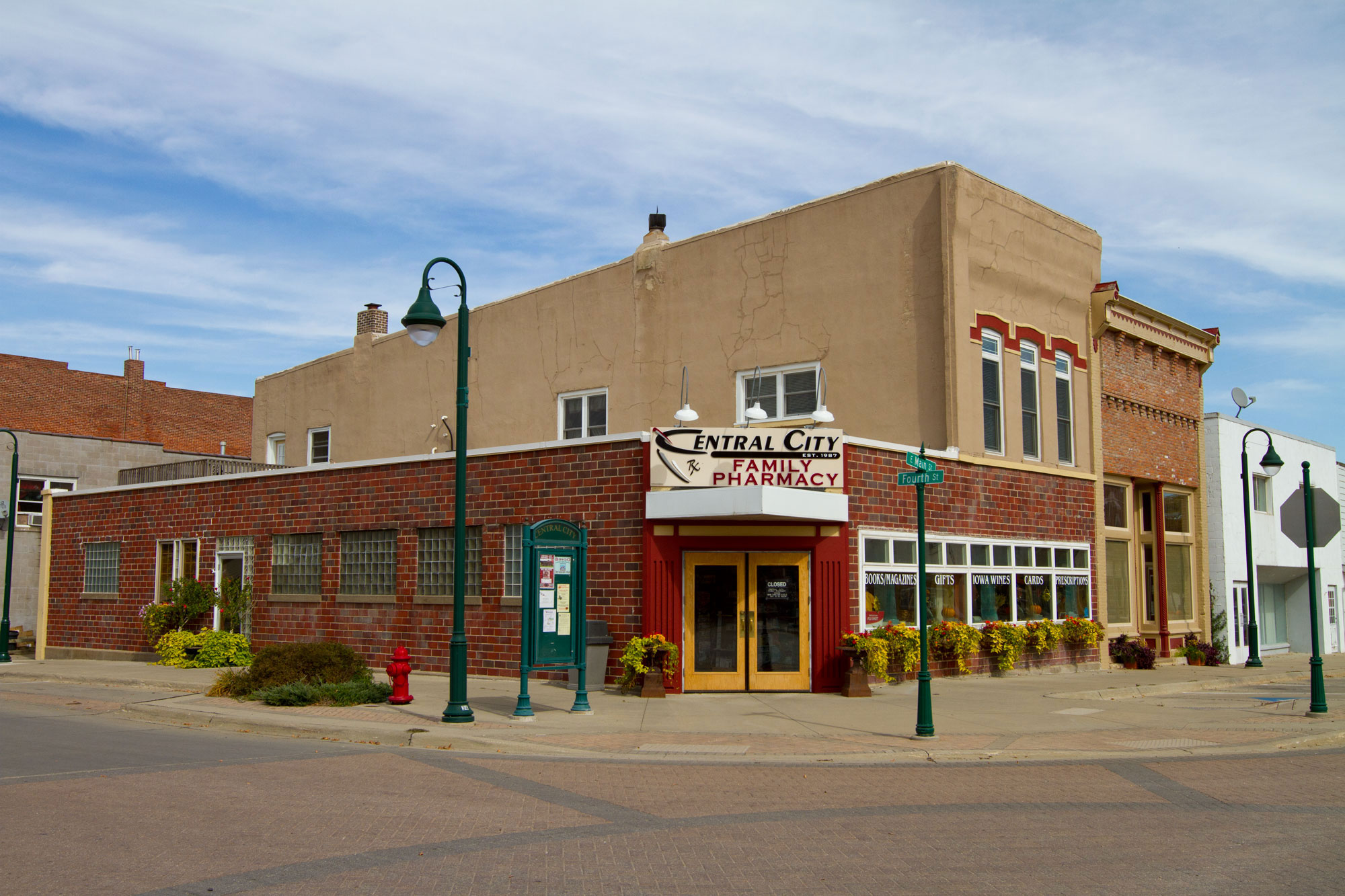

- Location within Iowa Location within the United States
- Location: 300 and 400 blocks of E. Main St., N. 4th St. to Commercial, Central City, Iowa
- Coordinates: 42°12′15″N 91°31′28″W
- Area: 4 acres (1.6 ha)
- Built by: Paul Sigmund
- Architectural style: Late Victorian; Late 19th And 20th Century Revivals
- NRHP reference No.: 02001027
- Added to NRHP: March 18, 2003

The Central City Commercial Historic District is a nationally recognized historic district located in Central City, Iowa, United States. It was listed on the National Register of Historic Places in 2003. At the time of its nomination it consisted of 27 resources, which included 18 contributing buildings, one contributing object, and eight non-contributing buildings. The historic district exemplifies the importance transportation played in the development of the central business district.

Central City was established in 1857. East Main Street and North Fourth Street were part of an early overland road system that was an important transportation corridor in Eastern Iowa. It linked the cities of Marion, Manchester, and Dubuque. Early business leaders in the community were successful in getting the Illinois Central Railroad to lay its tracks through town, which were completed in 1887. Two years later the commercial district was destroyed in a fire. Local entrepreneurs rebuilt the area as quickly as possible. Paul Sigmund, a noted local contractor-builder, built a group of buildings after the fire. The buildings are one- and two-stories in height and are of masonry construction, either brick or concrete block. Several buildings are constructed of wood frame. Several architectural styles are featured in the district including Late Victorian, Prairie School, Commercial style, and Art Deco. All of the buildings were constructed for commercial purposes, but a couple of them have been converted for residential use.
