= Alburnett, Iowa =

- City
- Motto: "The comfort of country and community"
- Location of Alburnett, Iowa
- Coordinates: 42°09′05″N 91°37′25″W
- Country: United States
- State: Iowa
- County: Linn
- Incorporated: June 29, 1912

Area
  - Total: 0.76 sq mi (1.97 km^{2})
  - Land: 0.76 sq mi (1.96 km^{2})
  - Water: 0.0039 sq mi (0.01 km^{2})
- Elevation: 899 ft (274 m)

Population (2020)
  - Total: 675
  - Density: 892.6/sq mi (344.65/km^{2})
- Time zone: UTC-6 (Central (CST))
  - Summer (DST): UTC-5 (CDT)
- ZIP code: 52202
- Area code: 319
- FIPS code: 19-01000
- GNIS feature ID: 2393909
- Website: alburnettia.org

Alburnett is a city in Linn County, Iowa. The population was 675 at the time of the 2020 census. It is part of the Cedar Rapids metropolitan area.

== History ==
In 1887, the Illinois Central Railroad was built through Linn County's Otter Creek township. In the winter of that year, a depot was built on land donated by Albert Burnett. Because he had given land for the depot, the name "Burnett" was chosen for its identification.

Business interests began to center around the depot because the railroad offered an outlet to both the north and the south, and because of its proximity to Cedar Rapids, Iowa. Burnett and his wife soon began to plat a community. Meanwhile, landowner Michael Weislogel began to lay out lots a short distance to the south. This community, called "Trentham," was the site of the first general store and post office. However, because contemporary state law dictated that a depot and post office in the same community must carry the same name, the name was soon changed to "Burnett." Mail delivery problems soon developed between Burnett and the community of Bennett in Cedar County. Consequently, "Al" Burnett changed the name to "Alburnett." Alburnett was incorporated in 1912.

== Geography ==
According to the United States Census Bureau, the city has a total area of 0.82 square miles (2.12 km^{2}), all land.

== Demographics ==
Historical populations
Year	Pop.	±%
1920	201	—
1930	199	−1.0%
1940	208	+4.5%
1950	254	+22.1%
1960	341	+34.3%
1970	418	+22.6%
1980	411	−1.7%
1990	459	+11.7%
2000	559	+21.8%
2010	673	+20.4%
2020	675	+0.3%
Source:"U.S. Census website". United States Census Bureau. and Iowa Data Center; Source: U.S. Decennial Census

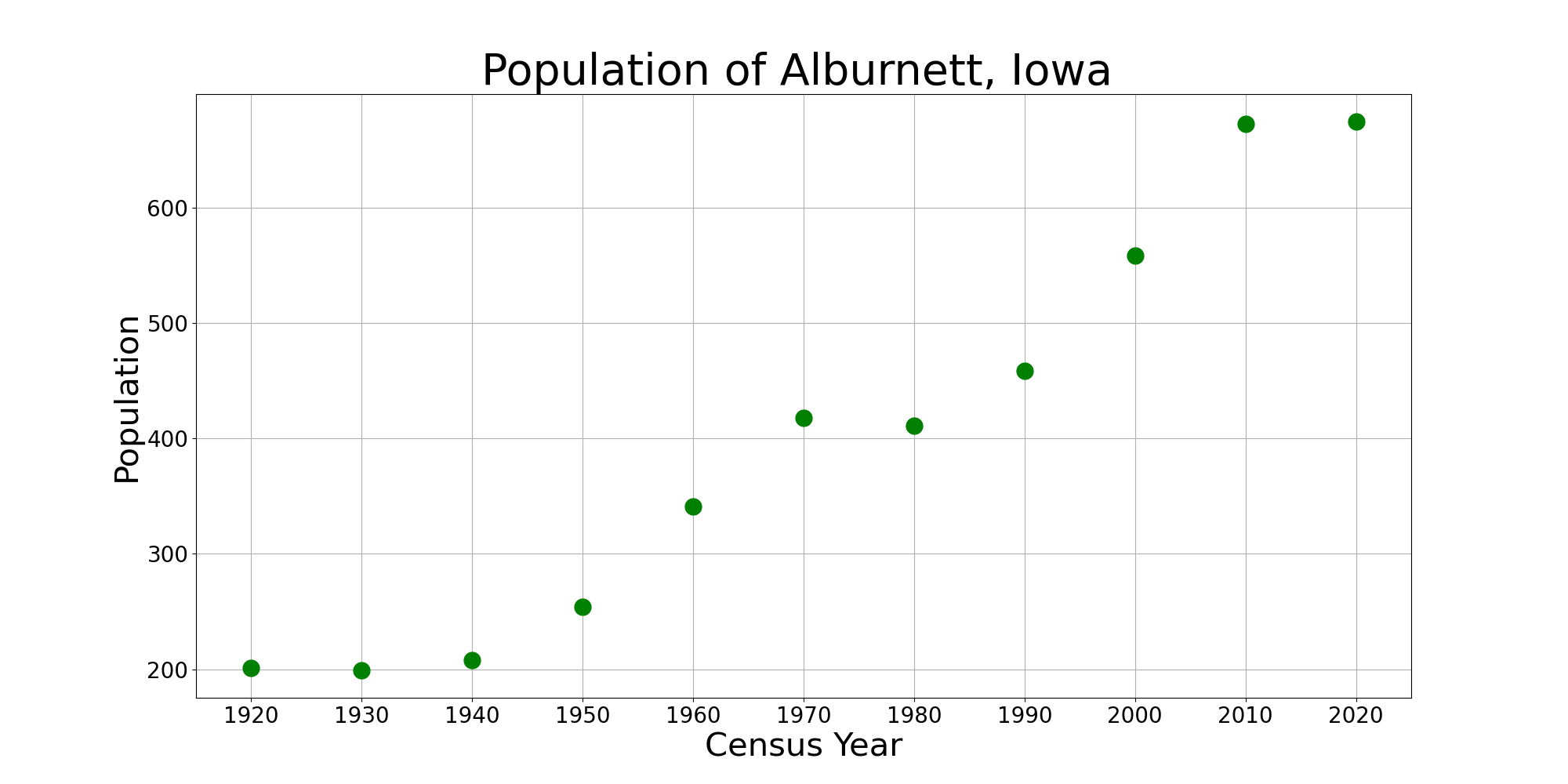
The population of Alburnett, Iowa from US census data

=== 2020 census ===
As of the census of 2020, there were 675 people, 246 households, and 192 families residing in the city. The population density was 892.6 inhabitants per square mile (344.6/km^{2}). There were 259 housing units at an average density of 342.5 per square mile (132.2/km^{2}). The racial makeup of the city was 94.4% White, 0.1% Black or African American, 0.3% Native American, 0.0% Asian, 0.0% Pacific Islander, 0.6% from other races and 4.6% from two or more races. Hispanic or Latino persons of any race comprised 0.9% of the population.

Of the 246 households, 39.0% of which had children under the age of 18 living with them, 60.6% were married couples living together, 6.9% were cohabitating couples, 17.1% had a female householder with no spouse or partner present and 15.4% had a male householder with no spouse or partner present. 22.0% of all households were non-families. 17.5% of all households were made up of individuals, 8.5% had someone living alone who was 65 years old or older.

The median age in the city was 40.8 years. 28.0% of the residents were under the age of 20; 5.8% were between the ages of 20 and 24; 23.6% were from 25 and 44; 28.6% were from 45 and 64; and 14.1% were 65 years of age or older. The gender makeup of the city was 52.0% male and 48.0% female.

=== 2010 census ===
As of the census of 2010, there were 673 people, 243 households, and 181 families residing in the city. The population density was 820.7 inhabitants per square mile (316.9/km^{2}). There were 252 housing units at an average density of 307.3 per square mile (118.6/km^{2}). The racial makeup of the city was 98.1% White, 0.4% Native American, and 1.5% from two or more races. Hispanic or Latino of any race were 1.2% of the population.

There were 243 households, of which 44.4% had children under the age of 18 living with them, 60.1% were married couples living together, 9.9% had a female householder with no husband present, 4.5% had a male householder with no wife present, and 25.5% were non-families. 20.6% of all households were made up of individuals, and 7.4% had someone living alone who was 65 years of age or older. The average household size was 2.77 and the average family size was 3.24.

The median age in the city was 35.5 years. 31.5% of residents were under the age of 18; 6.1% were between the ages of 18 and 24; 27.1% were from 25 to 44; 23.7% were from 45 to 64; and 11.6% were 65 years of age or older. The gender makeup of the city was 49.9% male and 50.1% female.

=== 2000 census ===
As of the census of 2000, there were 559 people, 199 households, and 152 families residing in the city. The population density was 650.3 inhabitants per square mile (251.1/km^{2}). There were 207 housing units at an average density of 240.8 per square mile (93.0/km^{2}). The racial makeup of the city was 99.28% White, and 0.72% from two or more races. Hispanic or Latino of any race were 0.18% of the population.

There were 199 households, out of which 47.7% had children under the age of 18 living with them, 62.8% were married couples living together, 10.6% had a female householder with no husband present, and 23.6% were non-families. 21.6% of all households were made up of individuals, and 10.1% had someone living alone who was 65 years of age or older. The average household size was 2.81 and the average family size was 3.32.

34.5% are under the age of 18, 6.4% from 18 to 24, 29.7% from 25 to 44, 19.7% from 45 to 64, and 9.7% who were 65 years of age or older. The median age was 32 years. For every 100 females, there were 91.4 males. For every 100 females age 18 and over, there were 96.8 males.

The median income for a household in the city was $54,464, and the median income for a family was $61,094. Males had a median income of $41,442 versus $26,083 for females. The per capita income for the city was $19,815. About 3.2% of families and 4.8% of the population were below the poverty line, including 3.2% of those under age 18 and 12.0% of those age 65 or over.

== Government ==
As of 2024, the Mayor is Bethany Sarazin and City Council members are Joe Trumm, TJ West, Chris Myers, Grant Soukup, and Dave Boesenberg.

The city council meets at 7:00 P.M. on the second Thursday of each month at the Alburnett City Hall at 120 N Main Avenue, Alburnett, Iowa.

== Public safety ==
Law enforcement services are contracted on an annual basis with the Linn County Sheriff's Office, under Sheriff Brian Gardner. The Fire Chief is Steve Graham. The department currently has 23 members made up of firefighters, EMTs, and ground support.

== Education ==
Alburnett is home to the Alburnett Community School District, a co-educational school system in Linn County with a district that covers all of Alburnett, all of the unincorporated town of Toddville, and areas of Marion, Robins, and Hiawatha. Grades PK through 12 are housed entirely within different portions and additions of the same building in Alburnett.

As of 2018, the district Superintendent is Dr. Dani Trimble, Secondary Principal (6–12) is Brian Moretz, Elementary Principal (PK-5) is Josh Henriksen, and Activities Director is Nick Wooldrik.

Alburnett high school competes in the Tri-Rivers Conference of eastern Iowa in a variety of athletics. The school colors are purple and gold, and the team name is the Pirates.

Notable alumni include actor Riley Smith, who has appeared on shows such as Dawson's Creek, 24, and in films such as Radio.
