= Washington Township, Linn County, Iowa =

Township in Linn County, Iowa, U.S.

Coordinates: 42.1736°N 91.7675°W

Washington Township is a township in Linn County, Iowa.

== History ==
Washington Township was organized in 1841.
