= Putnam Township, Linn County, Iowa =

Township in Linn County, Iowa, U.S.

Putnam Township
- Township
- Location in Iowa
- Coordinates: 41°53′52″N 91°33′01″W
- Country: United States
- State: Iowa
- County: Linn County
- Organized: 1841
- Time zone: UTC-6 (Central)
  - Summer (DST): UTC-5 (CDT)
- GNIS feature ID: 468583

Putnam Township is a township in Linn County, Iowa.

== History ==
Putnam Township was organized in 1841.
