= Prairieburg, Iowa =

- City
- Location of Prairieburg, Iowa
- Coordinates: 42°14′15″N 91°25′33″W
- Country: United States
- State: Iowa
- County: Linn

Area
  - Total: 0.45 sq mi (1.16 km^{2})
  - Land: 0.45 sq mi (1.16 km^{2})
  - Water: 0 sq mi (0.00 km^{2})
- Elevation: 968 ft (295 m)

Population (2020)
  - Total: 160
  - Density: 357/sq mi (137.8/km^{2})
- Time zone: UTC-6 (Central (CST))
  - Summer (DST): UTC-5 (CDT)
- ZIP code: 52219
- Area code: 319
- FIPS code: 19-64425
- GNIS feature ID: 2396269

Prairieburg is a city in Linn County, Iowa, United States. The population was 160 at the time of the 2020 census. It is part of the Cedar Rapids Metropolitan Statistical Area.

== History ==
Prairieburg was laid out in 1901.

== Geography ==
According to the United States Census Bureau, the city has a total area of 0.46 square miles (1.19 km^{2}), all land.

== Demographics ==
Historical populations
Year	Pop.	±%
1870	116	—
1880	154	+32.8%
1890	158	+2.6%
1900	164	+3.8%
1910	187	+14.0%
1920	176	−5.9%
1930	163	−7.4%
1940	193	+18.4%
1950	210	+8.8%
1960	226	+7.6%
1970	182	−19.5%
1980	197	+8.2%
1990	213	+8.1%
2000	175	−17.8%
2010	178	+1.7%
2020	160	−10.1%
Source:"U.S. Census website". United States Census Bureau. and Iowa Data Center; Source: U.S. Decennial Census

=== 2020 census ===
As of the census of 2020, there were 160 people, 71 households, and 54 families residing in the city. The population density was 356.9 inhabitants per square mile (137.8/km^{2}). There were 73 housing units at an average density of 162.8 per square mile (62.9/km^{2}). The racial makeup of the city was 92.5% White, 0.0% Black or African American, 0.0% Native American, 0.0% Asian, 0.0% Pacific Islander, 1.2% from other races and 6.2% from two or more races. Hispanic or Latino persons of any race comprised 1.2% of the population.

Of the 71 households, 42.3% of which had children under the age of 18 living with them, 46.5% were married couples living together, 11.3% were cohabitating couples, 14.1% had a female householder with no spouse or partner present and 28.2% had a male householder with no spouse or partner present. 23.9% of all households were non-families. 15.5% of all households were made up of individuals, 4.2% had someone living alone who was 65 years old or older.

The median age in the city was 45.5 years. 22.5% of the residents were under the age of 20; 6.2% were between the ages of 20 and 24; 20.0% were from 25 and 44; 38.1% were from 45 and 64; and 13.1% were 65 years of age or older. The gender makeup of the city was 48.1% male and 51.9% female.

=== 2010 census ===
As of the census of 2010, there were 178 people, 75 households, and 53 families living in the city. The population density was 387.0 inhabitants per square mile (149.4/km^{2}). There were 78 housing units at an average density of 169.6 per square mile (65.5/km^{2}). The racial makeup of the city was 100.0% White. Hispanic or Latino of any race were 1.7% of the population.

There were 75 households, of which 26.7% had children under the age of 18 living with them, 49.3% were married couples living together, 12.0% had a female householder with no husband present, 9.3% had a male householder with no wife present, and 29.3% were non-families. 24.0% of all households were made up of individuals, and 16% had someone living alone who was 65 years of age or older. The average household size was 2.37 and the average family size was 2.75.

The median age in the city was 47.1 years. 22.5% of residents were under the age of 18; 5.6% were between the ages of 18 and 24; 20.2% were from 25 to 44; 32% were from 45 to 64; and 19.7% were 65 years of age or older. The gender makeup of the city was 48.3% male and 51.7% female.

=== 2000 census ===
As of the census of 2000, there were 175 people, 69 households, and 54 families living in the city. The population density was 384.8 inhabitants per square mile (148.6/km^{2}). There were 72 housing units at an average density of 158.3 per square mile (61.1/km^{2}). The racial makeup of the city was 100.00% White.

There were 69 households, out of which 34.8% had children under the age of 18 living with them, 63.8% were married couples living together, 10.1% had a female householder with no husband present, and 21.7% were non-families. 18.8% of all households were made up of individuals, and 8.7% had someone living alone who was 65 years of age or older. The average household size was 2.54 and the average family size was 2.85.

In the city, the population was spread out, with 24.6% under the age of 18, 8.0% from 18 to 24, 38.3% from 25 to 44, 16.6% from 45 to 64, and 12.6% who were 65 years of age or older. The median age was 37 years. For every 100 females, there were 94.4 males. For every 100 females age 18 and over, there were 91.3 males.

The median income for a household in the city was $36,750, and the median income for a family was $39,063. Males had a median income of $40,750 versus $25,000 for females. The per capita income for the city was $17,197. About 10.6% of families and 12.9% of the population were below the poverty line, including 21.4% of those under the age of eighteen and none of those 65 or over.

== Education ==
The Central City Community School District operates local area public schools.

== Utilities ==
Telephone and Internet is provided by Hilliary Communications
