= Center Point–Urbana Community School District =

Public school district in Center Point Iowa, United states

Coordinates: 42.188145°N 91.791484°W

Location
- Center Point, Iowa Linn and Benton counties United States
- Coordinates: 42.188145, -91.791484

District information
- Type: Local school district
- Grades: K–12
- Established: 1993
- Superintendent: John Elkin
- Schools: 4
- Budget: $21,911,000 (2020-21)
- NCES District ID: 1906660

Students and staff
- Students: 1466 (2022-23)
- Teachers: 103.06 FTE
- Staff: 96.60 FTE
- Student–teacher ratio: 14.22
- Athletic conference: WaMaC Conference
- District mascot: Stormin' Pointers
- Colors: Black and gold

Other information
- Website: www.cpuschools.org

Center Point–Urbana Community School District (CPU) is a rural public school district headquartered in Center Point. The district is in Linn and Benton counties, and serves Center Point and Urbana.

== History ==
The district formed on July 1, 1993, with the merger of the Center Point and Urbana districts.

In 2016, Matt Berninghaus, previously of the North Union Community School District, became the Center Point–Urbana superintendent.

== Schools ==
- High School (Center Point)
  - In 2010 the district was considering adding another parking lot. Berninghaus stated that there was a parking deficit for thirty students.
- Middle School (Center Point)
- Intermediate School (Urbana)
- Preschool/Primary School (Center Point)

== Center Point-Urbana High School ==
=== Athletics ===
The Stormin' Pointers compete in the WaMaC Conference in the following sports:

- Baseball
- Basketball (boys and girls)
  - Girls' Class 2A state champions - 1995
  - Girls' Class 3A state champions - 2019
- Bowling
- Cross country (boys and girls)
- Football
  - Class 1A state champions - 1985
- Golf (boys and girls)
  - Boys' Class 2A state champions - 1998
- Soccer (boys and girls)
- Softball
- Swimming (boys and girls)
- Tennis (boys and girls)
- Track and field (boys and girls)
  - Boys' Class 3A state champions - 2015
- Volleyball
- Wrestling

== See also ==
- List of school districts in Iowa
- List of high schools in Iowa
