= Brown Township, Linn County, Iowa =

Township in Linn County, Iowa, U.S.

Coordinates: 42.0711°N 91.4053°W

Brown Township is a township in Linn County, Iowa.

== History ==
Brown Township is named for Nathan Brown, who settled in Linn County in 1839. Brown Township was organized in 1841.
