= Central City, Iowa =

- City
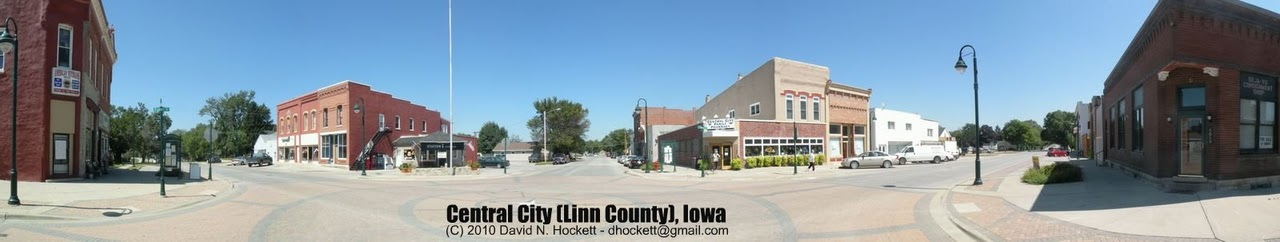
- Central City panorama in 2010

- Location of Central City, Iowa
- Coordinates: 42°12′09″N 91°31′29″W
- Country: United States
- State: Iowa
- County: Linn

Area
  - Total: 1.10 sq mi (2.84 km^{2})
  - Land: 1.07 sq mi (2.78 km^{2})
  - Water: 0.023 sq mi (0.06 km^{2})
- Elevation: 824 ft (251 m)

Population (2020)
  - Total: 1,264
  - Density: 1,176.8/sq mi (454.35/km^{2})
- Time zone: UTC-6 (Central (CST))
  - Summer (DST): UTC-5 (CDT)
- ZIP code: 52214
- Area code: 319
- FIPS code: 19-12495
- GNIS feature ID: 2393786
- Website: https://www.centralcityia.gov/

Central City is a city in Linn County, Iowa, United States. The population was 1,264 at the 2020 census. It is part of the Cedar Rapids Metropolitan Statistical Area.

== History ==
Central City was founded in the 1850s. The name Central City refers to its location within proximity to railroads.

A section of the downtown area has been listed on the National Register of Historic Places as the Central City Commercial Historic District.

== Geography ==
According to the United States Census Bureau, the city has a total area of 0.97 square miles (2.51 km^{2}), of which 0.95 square miles (2.46 km^{2}) is land and 0.02 square miles (0.05 km^{2}) is water.

== Demographics ==
Historical populations
Year	Pop.	±%
1890	467	—
1900	623	+33.4%
1910	558	−10.4%
1920	688	+23.3%
1930	780	+13.4%
1940	810	+3.8%
1950	965	+19.1%
1960	1,087	+12.6%
1970	1,116	+2.7%
1980	1,067	−4.4%
1990	1,063	−0.4%
2000	1,157	+8.8%
2010	1,257	+8.6%
2020	1,264	+0.6%
Source:"U.S. Census website". United States Census Bureau. and Iowa Data Center; Source: U.S. Decennial Census

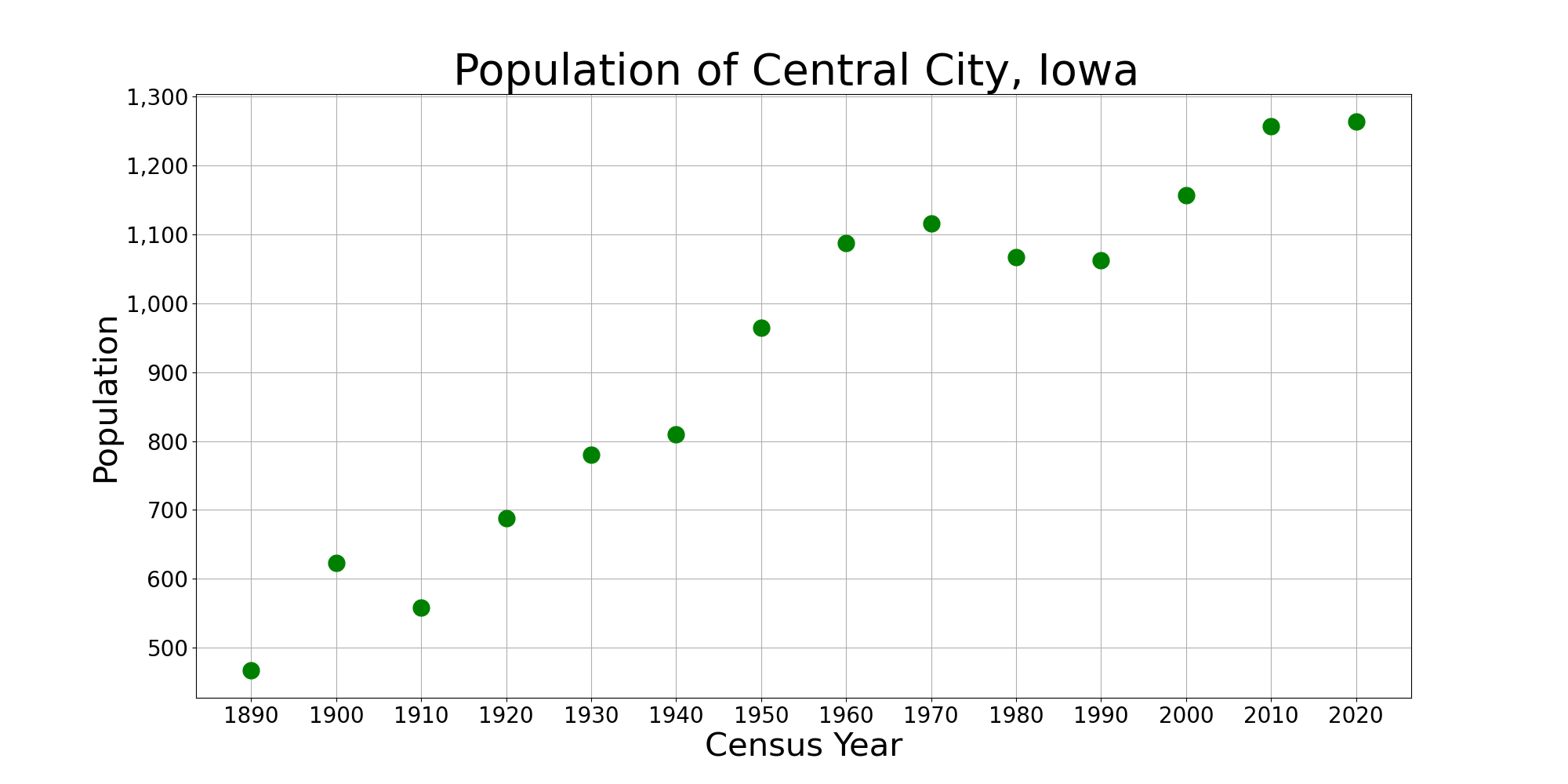
The population of Central City, Iowa from US census data

=== 2020 census ===
As of the 2020 census, there were 1,264 people, 548 households, and 341 families residing in the city. The population density was 1,176.8 inhabitants per square mile (454.3/km^{2}). There were 570 housing units at an average density of 530.7 per square mile (204.9/km^{2}). 0.0% of residents lived in urban areas, while 100.0% lived in rural areas.

The median age in the city was 39.3 years. 23.9% of residents were under the age of 18, 26.3% were under the age of 20, 5.1% were between the ages of 20 and 24, 25.6% were from 25 to 44, 24.8% were from 45 to 64, and 18.2% were 65 years of age or older. The gender makeup of the city was 48.5% male and 51.5% female; for every 100 females there were 94.2 males, and for every 100 females age 18 and over there were 96.3 males age 18 and over.

Of all households, 32.7% had children under the age of 18 living in them; 48.0% were married-couple households, 9.5% were cohabitating couples, 24.3% had a female householder with no spouse or partner present, and 18.2% had a male householder with no spouse or partner present. 37.8% of all households were non-families. About 31.2% of all households were made up of individuals, and 14.2% had someone living alone who was 65 years of age or older.

Housing units had a vacancy rate of 3.9%, including a homeowner vacancy rate of 1.0% and a rental vacancy rate of 2.7%.

Racial composition as of the 2020 census
Race	Number	Percent
White	1,190	94.1%
Black or African American	5	0.4%
American Indian and Alaska Native	0	0.0%
Asian	1	0.1%
Native Hawaiian and Other Pacific Islander	0	0.0%
Some other race	10	0.8%
Two or more races	58	4.6%
Hispanic or Latino (of any race)	26	2.1%

=== 2010 census ===
As of the census of 2010, there were 1,257 people, 522 households, and 351 families living in the city. The population density was 1,323.2 inhabitants per square mile (510.9/km^{2}). There were 556 housing units at an average density of 585.3 per square mile (226.0/km^{2}). The racial makeup of the city was 98.3% White, 0.6% African American, 0.2% Native American, 0.2% Asian, 0.1% from other races, and 0.6% from two or more races. Hispanic or Latino of any race were 1.2% of the population.

There were 522 households, of which 33.1% had children under the age of 18 living with them, 53.3% were married couples living together, 10.0% had a female householder with no husband present, 4.0% had a male householder with no wife present, and 32.8% were non-families. 27.0% of all households were made up of individuals, and 14.2% had someone living alone who was 65 years of age or older. The average household size was 2.41 and the average family size was 2.93.

The median age in the city was 39.5 years. 24.5% of residents were under the age of 18; 7.5% were between the ages of 18 and 24; 25.1% were from 25 to 44; 26.1% were from 45 to 64; and 16.7% were 65 years of age or older. The gender makeup of the city was 48.8% male and 51.2% female.

=== 2000 census ===
As of the census of 2000, there were 1,157 people, 490 households, and 320 families living in the city. The population density was 1,303.2 inhabitants per square mile (503.2/km^{2}). There were 511 housing units at an average density of 575.6 per square mile (222.2/km^{2}). The racial makeup of the city was 98.96% White, 0.09% Native American, 0.09% Asian, and 0.86% from two or more races. Hispanic or Latino of any race were 0.52% of the population.

There were 490 households, out of which 31.4% had children under the age of 18 living with them, 54.1% were married couples living together, 7.6% had a female householder with no husband present, and 34.5% were non-families. 31.4% of all households were made up of individuals, and 19.0% had someone living alone who was 65 years of age or older. The average household size was 2.36 and the average family size was 2.97.

Age spread: 25.5% under the age of 18, 6.9% from 18 to 24, 28.6% from 25 to 44, 21.3% from 45 to 64, and 17.7% who were 65 years of age or older. The median age was 39 years. For every 100 females, there were 88.1 males. For every 100 females age 18 and over, there were 83.8 males.

The median income for a household in the city was $36,544, and the median income for a family was $49,318. Males had a median income of $33,083 versus $24,400 for females. The per capita income for the city was $18,800. About 1.3% of families and 3.3% of the population were below the poverty line, including 0.7% of those under age 18 and 8.5% of those age 65 or over.

== Education ==
The Central City Community School District operates local area public schools.
