= Coggon, Iowa =

- City
- Location of Coggon, Iowa
- Coordinates: 42°16′42″N 91°31′49″W
- Country: United States
- State: Iowa
- County: Linn

Area
  - Total: 0.67 sq mi (1.74 km^{2})
  - Land: 0.65 sq mi (1.68 km^{2})
  - Water: 0.019 sq mi (0.05 km^{2})
- Elevation: 945 ft (288 m)

Population (2020)
  - Total: 701
  - Density: 1,078/sq mi (416.2/km^{2})
- Time zone: UTC-6 (Central (CST))
  - Summer (DST): UTC-5 (CDT)
- ZIP code: 52218
- Area code: 319
- FIPS code: 19-14925
- GNIS feature ID: 2393585
- Website: www.coggonia.org

Coggon is a city in Linn County, Iowa, United States. The population was 701 at the time of the 2020 census. It is part of the Cedar Rapids Metropolitan Statistical Area.

== History ==
Coggon was founded in 1857, and celebrated its sesquicentennial in 2007. The town's motto is "The One and Only." This is because Coggon, Iowa is the only town named Coggon in the whole world. Previously, the motto was "Some bigger, none better."

Coggon is most well known as the site of the 1953 tornado that damaged much of the northwest portion of the town. Coggon is home to The Coggon Rockets baseball and softball teams, which, in 2012 won the Coggon Little League Championship game and took home the title of best softball team west of the Wapsipinicon River.

Located in Coggan is Robert Kirkpatrick Round Barn, listed on the National Register of Historic Places.

== Geography ==
According to the United States Census Bureau, the city has a total area of 0.65 square miles (1.68 km^{2}), of which 0.63 square miles (1.63 km^{2}) is land and 0.02 square miles (0.05 km^{2}) is water.

== Demographics ==
Historical populations
Year	Pop.	±%
1900	498	—
1910	471	−5.4%
1920	553	+17.4%
1930	503	−9.0%
1940	512	+1.8%
1950	604	+18.0%
1960	672	+11.3%
1970	656	−2.4%
1980	639	−2.6%
1990	645	+0.9%
2000	745	+15.5%
2010	658	−11.7%
2020	701	+6.5%
Source:"U.S. Census website". United States Census Bureau. and Iowa Data Center; Source: U.S. Decennial Census

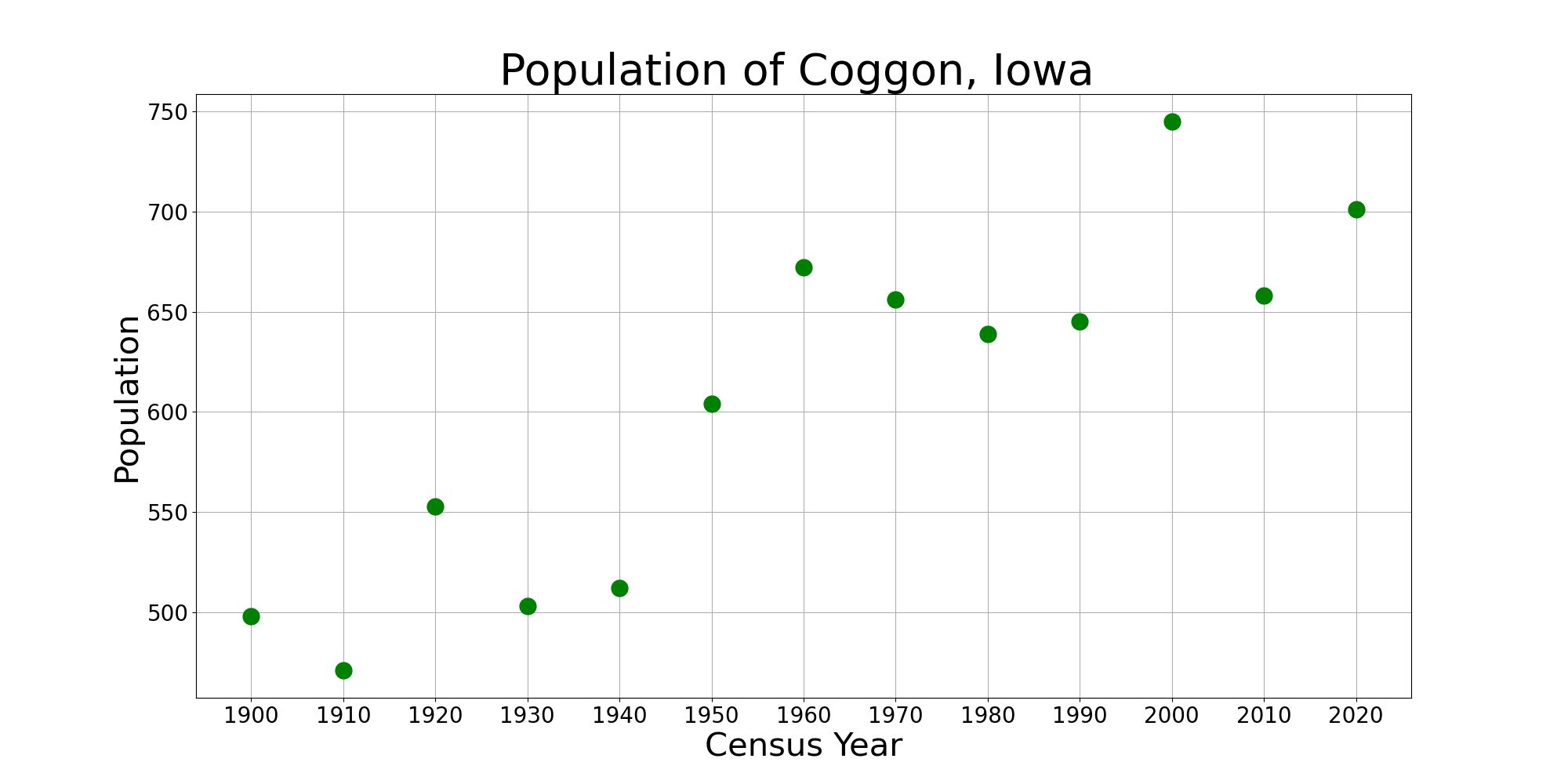
The population of Coggon, Iowa from US census data

=== 2020 census ===
As of the census of 2020, there were 701 people, 272 households, and 191 families residing in the city. The population density was 1,077.9 inhabitants per square mile (416.2/km^{2}). There were 290 housing units at an average density of 445.9 per square mile (172.2/km^{2}). The racial makeup of the city was 95.4% White, 0.6% Black or African American, 0.6% Native American, 0.0% Asian, 0.0% Pacific Islander, 0.4% from other races and 3.0% from two or more races. Hispanic or Latino persons of any race comprised 0.9% of the population.

Of the 272 households, 36.0% of which had children under the age of 18 living with them, 49.6% were married couples living together, 12.5% were cohabitating couples, 21.3% had a female householder with no spouse or partner present and 16.5% had a male householder with no spouse or partner present. 29.8% of all households were non-families. 23.5% of all households were made up of individuals, 14.0% had someone living alone who was 65 years old or older.

The median age in the city was 36.3 years. 28.5% of the residents were under the age of 20; 5.6% were between the ages of 20 and 24; 26.7% were from 25 and 44; 22.5% were from 45 and 64; and 16.7% were 65 years of age or older. The gender makeup of the city was 52.4% male and 47.6% female.

=== 2010 census ===
As of the census of 2010, there were 658 people, 266 households, and 177 families living in the city. The population density was 1,044.4 inhabitants per square mile (403.2/km^{2}). There were 288 housing units at an average density of 457.1 per square mile (176.5/km^{2}). The racial makeup of the city was 99.7% White, 0.2% African American, and 0.2% from two or more races. Hispanic or Latino of any race were 0.5% of the population.

There were 266 households, of which 36.8% had children under the age of 18 living with them, 52.6% were married couples living together, 5.6% had a female householder with no husband present, 8.3% had a male householder with no wife present, and 33.5% were non-families. 27.1% of all households were made up of individuals, and 12.7% had someone living alone who was 65 years of age or older. The average household size was 2.47 and the average family size was 3.00.

The median age in the city was 35.4 years. 27.4% of residents were under the age of 18; 7.8% were between the ages of 18 and 24; 27.6% were from 25 to 44; 20.1% were from 45 to 64; and 17.2% were 65 years of age or older. The gender makeup of the city was 50.2% male and 49.8% female.

=== 2000 census ===
As of the census of 2000, there were 745 people, 277 households, and 209 families living in the city. The population density was 1,190.3 people per square mile (456.6 per km^{2}). There were 285 housing units at an average density of 455.4 per square mile (174.7 per km^{2}). The racial makeup of the city was 99.87% White and 0.13% Asian. Hispanic or Latino of any race were 0.40% of the population.

There were 277 households, out of which 36.1% had children under the age of 18 living with them, 63.9% were married couples living together, 6.9% had a female householder with no husband present, and 24.2% were non-families. 21.3% of all households were made up of individuals, and 11.6% had someone living alone who was 65 years of age or older. The average household size was 2.69 and the average family size was 3.12.

In the city, the population was spread out, with 30.2% under the age of 18, 5.2% from 18 to 24, 29.5% from 25 to 44, 19.1% from 45 to 64, and 16.0% who were 65 years of age or older. The median age was 35 years. For every 100 females, there were 89.6 males. For every 100 females age 18 and over, there were 94.8 males.

The median income for a household in the city was $45,000, and the median income for a family was $58,214. Males had a median income of $38,958 versus $26,111 for females. The per capita income for the city was $19,871. About 4.4% of families and 6.2% of the population were below the poverty line, including 8.8% of those under age 18 and 9.0% of those age 65 or over.

It is home to the Coggon Rockets softball team of T-ball, Coach Pitch, and Pitch.

== Education ==
The North Linn Community School District operates area public schools.

== Notable people ==
- Chris Carney (born 1959) — American politician
