= Otter Creek Township, Linn County, Iowa =

Township in Linn County, Iowa, U.S.

Coordinates: 42.1569°N 91.6586°W

Otter Creek Township is a township in Linn County, Iowa.

== History ==
Otter Creek Township was organized in 1844.
