= Urbana, Iowa =

- City
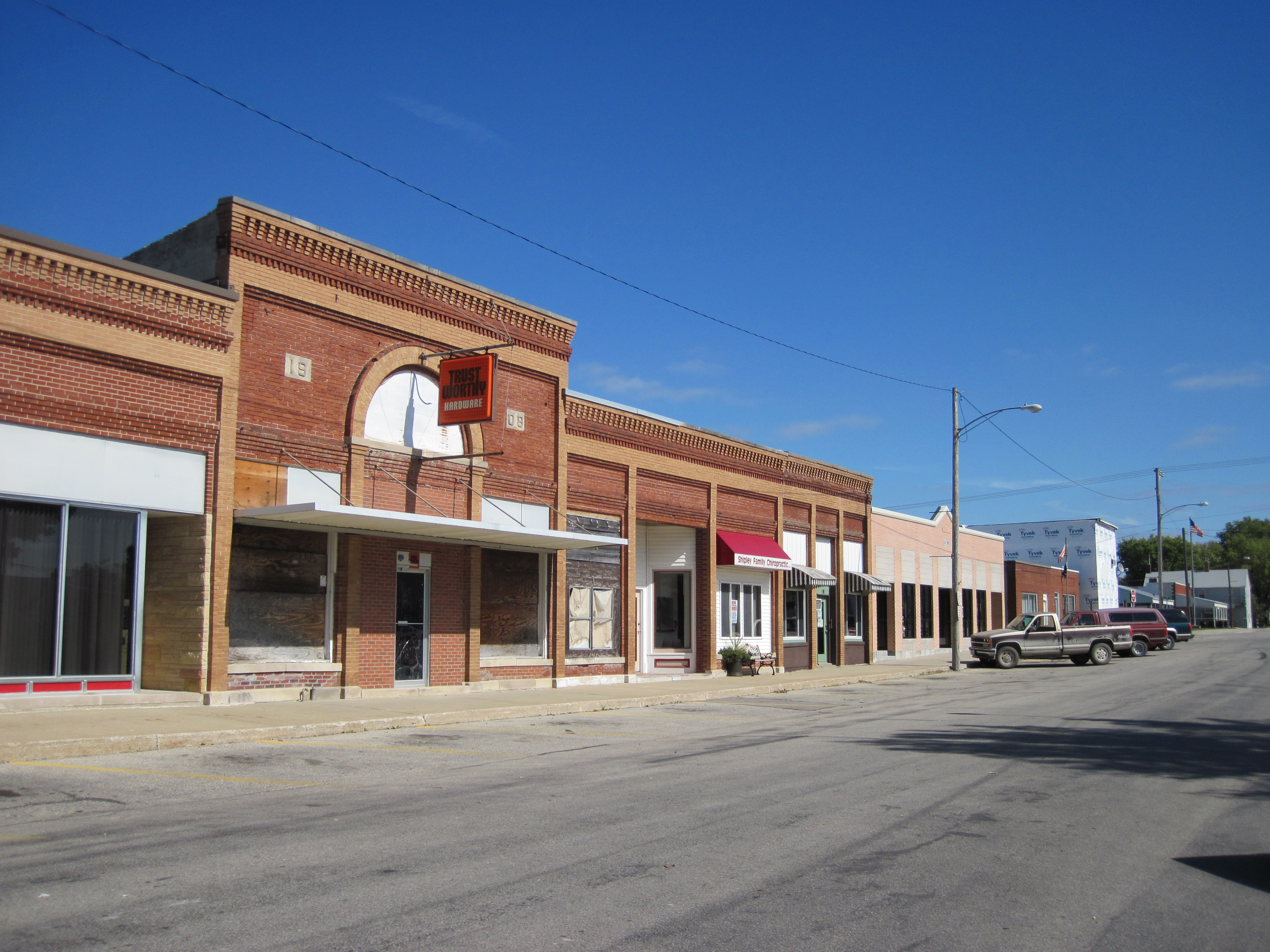
- Downtown Urbana

- Location of Urbana, Iowa
- Coordinates: 42°13′27″N 91°52′41″W
- Country: United States
- State: Iowa
- County: Benton

Area
  - Total: 1.81 sq mi (4.68 km^{2})
  - Land: 1.81 sq mi (4.68 km^{2})
  - Water: 0 sq mi (0.00 km^{2})
- Elevation: 938 ft (286 m)

Population (2020)
  - Total: 1,554
  - Density: 860.6/sq mi (332.28/km^{2})
- Time zone: UTC-6 (Central (CST))
  - Summer (DST): UTC-5 (CDT)
- ZIP code: 52345
- Area code: 319
- FIPS code: 19-79905
- GNIS feature ID: 0462503
- Website: urbanaiowa.frontdeskgworks.com/c/

Urbana is a city in Benton County, Iowa, United States. The population was 1,554 at the time of the 2020 census. It is part of the Cedar Rapids Metropolitan Statistical Area.

== History ==
Urbana (previously known as Hoosier Point and Marysville) was laid out in 1847.

== Geography ==
According to the United States Census Bureau, the city has a total area of 2.20 square miles (5.70 km^{2}), all land.

Urbana is roughly midway between Cedar Rapids and Waterloo. Interstate 380 and Iowa Highway 150 intersect here.

== Demographics ==
Historical populations
Year	Pop.	±%
1900	323	—
1910	306	−5.3%
1920	477	+55.9%
1930	354	−25.8%
1940	397	+12.1%
1950	414	+4.3%
1960	544	+31.4%
1970	552	+1.5%
1980	574	+4.0%
1990	595	+3.7%
2000	1,019	+71.3%
2010	1,458	+43.1%
2020	1,554	+6.6%
Source:"U.S. Census website". United States Census Bureau. and Iowa Data Center; Source: U.S. Decennial Census

=== 2020 census ===
As of the 2020 census, Urbana had a population of 1,554 people, with 554 households and 417 families. The population density was 763.2 inhabitants per square mile (294.7/km^{2}). The median age was 34.6 years. 30.1% of residents were under the age of 18. For every 100 females there were 105.8 males, and for every 100 females age 18 and over there were 100.0 males age 18 and over.

0.0% of residents lived in urban areas, while 100.0% lived in rural areas.

There were 554 households, of which 45.5% had children under the age of 18 living with them. Of all households, 62.1% were married-couple households, 9.4% were cohabitating-couple households, 14.3% had a male householder with no spouse or partner present, and 14.3% had a female householder with no spouse or partner present. About 24.7% of households were non-families, 17.9% of all households were made up of individuals, and 7.8% had someone living alone who was 65 years of age or older.

There were 574 housing units, of which 3.5% were vacant. The housing-unit density was 281.9 per square mile (108.8/km^{2}). The homeowner vacancy rate was 1.4% and the rental vacancy rate was 6.3%.

The age distribution was 33.1% under age 20, 4.2% from 20 to 24, 28.2% from 25 to 44, 24.6% from 45 to 64, and 9.9% age 65 or older. The gender makeup of the city was 51.4% male and 48.6% female.

Racial composition as of the 2020 census
Race	Number	Percent
White	1,482	95.4%
Black or African American	8	0.5%
American Indian and Alaska Native	0	0.0%
Asian	6	0.4%
Native Hawaiian and Other Pacific Islander	1	0.1%
Some other race	5	0.3%
Two or more races	52	3.3%
Hispanic or Latino (of any race)	18	1.2%

=== 2010 census ===
As of the census of 2010, there were 1,458 people, 520 households, and 412 families living in the city. The population density was 662.7 inhabitants per square mile (255.9/km^{2}). There were 543 housing units at an average density of 246.8 per square mile (95.3/km^{2}). The racial makeup of the city was 97.5% White, 0.3% African American, 0.3% Asian, 0.2% from other races, and 1.7% from two or more races. Hispanic or Latino of any race were 1.0% of the population.

There were 520 households, of which 48.3% had children under the age of 18 living with them, 64.8% were married couples living together, 9.0% had a female householder with no husband present, 5.4% had a male householder with no wife present, and 20.8% were non-families. 15.6% of all households were made up of individuals, and 6.5% had someone living alone who was 65 years of age or older. The average household size was 2.80, and the average family size was 3.14.

The median age in the city was 32.1 years. 32.2% of residents were under the age of 18; 5.5% were between the ages of 18 and 24; 35% were from 25 to 44; 19.6% were from 45 to 64; and 7.6% were 65 years of age or older. The gender makeup of the city was 50.5% male and 49.5% female.

=== 2000 census ===
As of the census of 2000, there were 1,019 people, 372 households, and 284 families living in the city. The population density was 1,512.5 inhabitants per square mile (584.0/km^{2}). There were 384 housing units at an average density of 570.0 per square mile (220.1/km^{2}). The racial makeup of the city was 99.61% White, 0.29% African American and 0.10% Native American. Hispanic or Latino of any race were 0.59% of the population.

There were 372 households, out of which 43.0% had children under the age of 18 living with them, 66.9% were married couples living together, 5.4% had a female householder with no husband present, and 23.4% were non-families. 18.8% of all households were made up of individuals, and 9.1% had someone living alone who was 65 years of age or older. The average household size was 2.74, and the average family size was 3.13.

30.5% were under the age of 18, 8.2% from 18 to 24, 38.0% from 25 to 44, 13.9% from 45 to 64, and 9.3% were 65 years of age or older. The median age was 31 years. For every 100 females, there were 100.6 males. For every 100 females age 18 and over, there were 98.9 males.

The median income for a household in the city was $49,063, and the median income for a family was $54,327. Males had a median income of $35,682 versus $23,750 for females. The per capita income for the city was $18,005. About 0.7% of families and 1.1% of the population were below the poverty line, including none of those under age 18 and 5.1% of those age 65 or over.

== Education ==
Urbana is within the Center Point–Urbana Community School District. The district formed on July 1, 1993, with the merger of the Center Point and Urbana districts.

== Notable person ==
- Cal Eldred, MLB pitcher
