= Center Point, Iowa =

- City
- Location of Center Point, Iowa
- Coordinates: 42°11′05″N 91°46′47″W
- Country: United States
- State: Iowa
- County: Linn

Area
  - Total: 2.54 sq mi (6.57 km^{2})
  - Land: 2.54 sq mi (6.57 km^{2})
  - Water: 0 sq mi (0.00 km^{2})
- Elevation: 840 ft (260 m)

Population (2020)
  - Total: 2,579
  - Density: 1,016/sq mi (392.4/km^{2})
- Time zone: UTC-6 (Central (CST))
  - Summer (DST): UTC-5 (CDT)
- ZIP code: 52213
- Area code: 319
- FIPS code: 19-12270
- GNIS feature ID: 2393781
- Website: www.centerpointia.com

Center Point is a city in Linn County, Iowa, United States. The population was 2,579 at the 2020 census. It is part of the Cedar Rapids Metropolitan Statistical Area.

== History ==
The first house was built in Center Point in 1854.

== Geography ==
According to the United States Census Bureau, the city has a total area of 2.60 square miles (6.73 km^{2}), all land.

== Demographics ==
Historical populations
Year	Pop.	±%
1870	443	—
1880	603	+36.1%
1890	615	+2.0%
1900	674	+9.6%
1910	802	+19.0%
1920	773	−3.6%
1930	812	+5.0%
1940	861	+6.0%
1950	987	+14.6%
1960	1,236	+25.2%
1970	1,456	+17.8%
1980	1,591	+9.3%
1990	1,693	+6.4%
2000	2,007	+18.5%
2010	2,421	+20.6%
2020	2,579	+6.5%
Source:"U.S. Census website". United States Census Bureau. and Iowa Data Center; Source: U.S. Decennial Census

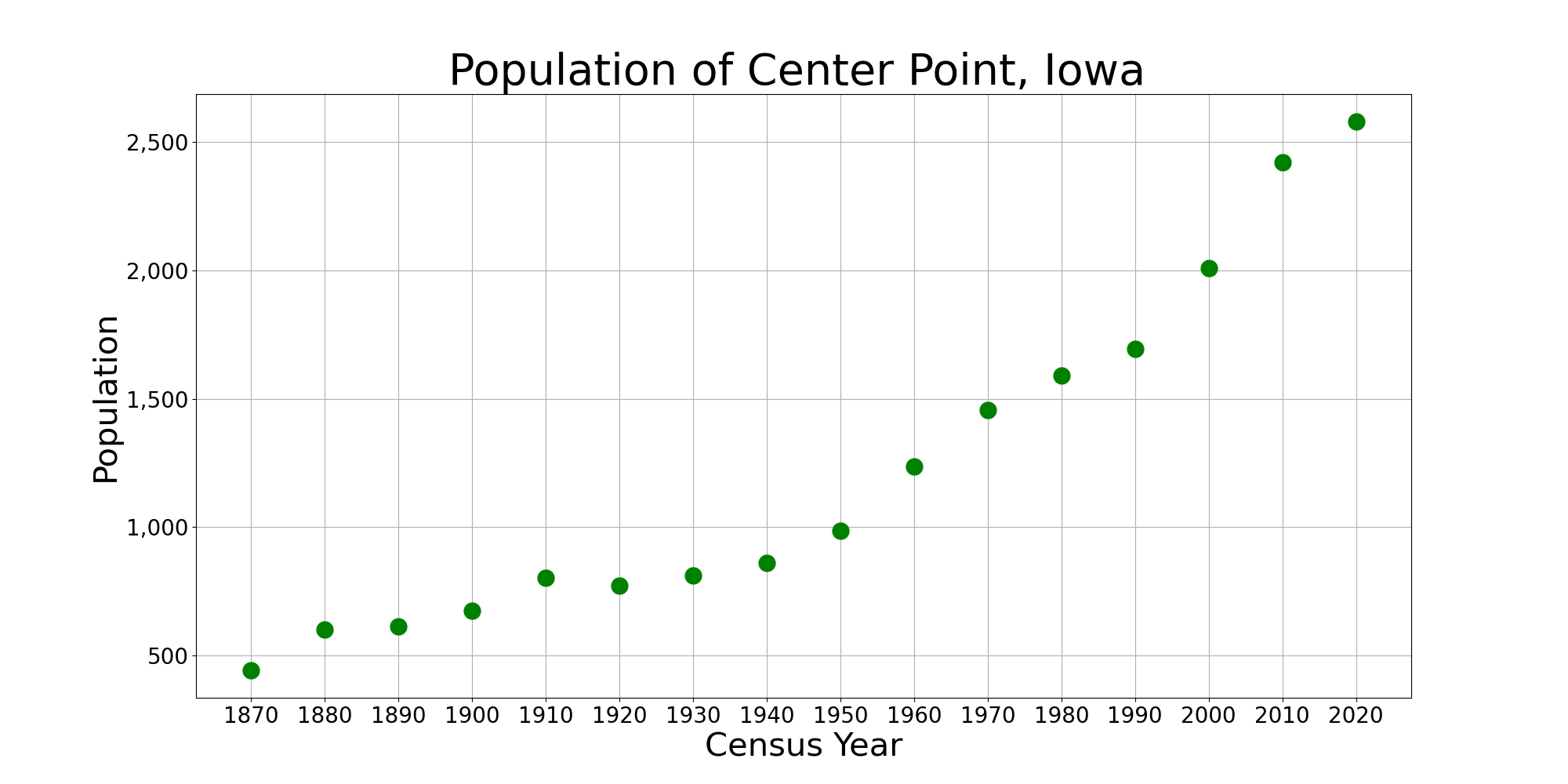
The population of Center Point, Iowa from US census data

=== 2020 census ===
As of the 2020 census, there were 2,579 people, 967 households, and 691 families residing in the city. The population density was 1,016.3 inhabitants per square mile (392.4/km^{2}). There were 1,000 housing units at an average density of 394.1 per square mile (152.2/km^{2}).

The median age was 36.2 years. 29.3% of residents were under the age of 18 and 11.6% were 65 years of age or older. 4.3% of residents were between the ages of 20 and 24, 25.9% were from 25 to 44, and 25.8% were from 45 to 64. The gender makeup of the city was 48.9% male and 51.1% female. For every 100 females there were 95.5 males, and for every 100 females age 18 and over there were 93.6 males age 18 and over.

Of all households, 41.2% had children under the age of 18 living with them. 56.3% were married-couple households, 8.7% were cohabitating-couple households, 13.4% were households with a male householder and no spouse or partner present, and 21.6% were households with a female householder and no spouse or partner present. 28.5% of all households were non-families. About 22.9% of all households were made up of individuals, and 9.9% had someone living alone who was 65 years of age or older.

Of the housing units, 3.3% were vacant. The homeowner vacancy rate was 1.5% and the rental vacancy rate was 2.8%. 0.0% of residents lived in urban areas, while 100.0% lived in rural areas.

Racial composition as of the 2020 census
Race	Number	Percent
White	2,434	94.4%
Black or African American	6	0.2%
American Indian and Alaska Native	3	0.1%
Asian	10	0.4%
Native Hawaiian and Other Pacific Islander	0	0.0%
Some other race	12	0.5%
Two or more races	114	4.4%
Hispanic or Latino (of any race)	40	1.6%

=== 2010 census ===
As of the census of 2010, there were 2,421 people, 887 households, and 665 families living in the city. The population density was 931.2 inhabitants per square mile (359.5/km^{2}). There were 942 housing units at an average density of 362.3 per square mile (139.9/km^{2}). The racial makeup of the city was 97.1% White, 0.9% African American, 0.4% Native American, 0.3% Asian, 0.3% from other races, and 1.0% from two or more races. Hispanic or Latino of any race were 0.4% of the population.

There were 887 households, of which 45.0% had children under the age of 18 living with them, 60.9% were married couples living together, 8.9% had a female householder with no husband present, 5.2% had a male householder with no wife present, and 25.0% were non-families. 20.4% of all households were made up of individuals, and 8.3% had someone living alone who was 65 years of age or older. The average household size was 2.73 and the average family size was 3.15.

The median age in the city was 34.7 years. 31.8% of residents were under the age of 18; 5.7% were between the ages of 18 and 24; 30.6% were from 25 to 44; 22.8% were from 45 to 64; and 9.1% were 65 years of age or older. The gender makeup of the city was 49.9% male and 50.1% female.

=== 2000 census ===
As of the census of 2000, there were 2,007 people, 765 households, and 550 families living in the city. The population density was 834.5 inhabitants per square mile (322.2/km^{2}). There were 789 housing units at an average density of 328.1 per square mile (126.7/km^{2}). The racial makeup of the city was 98.36% White, 0.45% African American, 0.05% Native American, 0.10% Asian, 0.15% from other races, and 0.90% from two or more races. Hispanic or Latino of any race were 0.35% of the population.

There were 765 households, out of which 41.2% had children under the age of 18 living with them, 59.5% were married couples living together, 9.0% had a female householder with no husband present, and 28.1% were non-families. 23.7% of all households were made up of individuals, and 12.7% had someone living alone who was 65 years of age or older. The average household size was 2.62 and the average family size was 3.11.

Age spread: 30.4% under the age of 18, 6.5% from 18 to 24, 33.7% from 25 to 44, 18.4% from 45 to 64, and 10.9% who were 65 years of age or older. The median age was 34 years. For every 100 females, there were 95.4 males. For every 100 females age 18 and over, there were 93.1 males.

The median income for a household in the city was $48,352, and the median income for a family was $55,677. Males had a median income of $36,702 versus $25,601 for females. The per capita income for the city was $19,527. About 3.2% of families and 4.6% of the population were below the poverty line, including 5.4% of those under age 18 and 9.0% of those age 65 or over.

== Education ==
It is within the Center Point–Urbana Community School District. The district formed on July 1, 1993, with the merger of the Center Point and Urbana districts.

== Notable people ==
- Bill Gustoff (born 1968), member of the Iowa House of Representatives, raised in Center Point
- Quentin Stanerson (born 1977), member of the Iowa House of Representatives, lived in Center Point for 15 years
- Elizabeth Wilson (born 1964), member of the Iowa House of Representatives, raised in Center Point
