= Linn County, Iowa =

County in Iowa, United States

- County
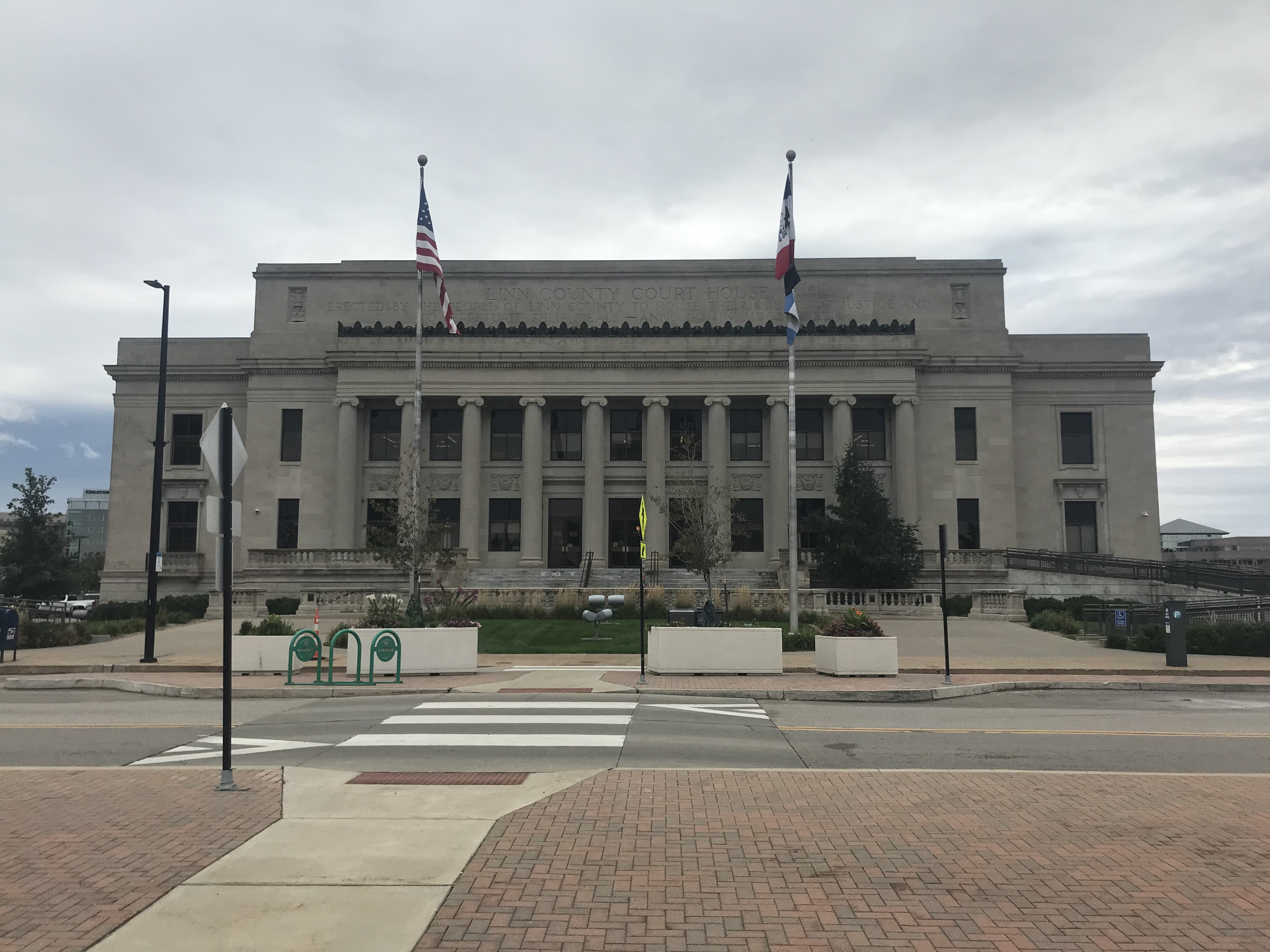
- The Linn County Courthouse in Cedar Rapids

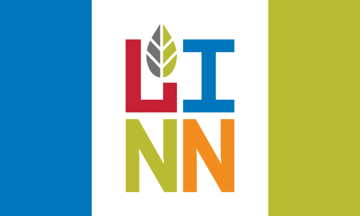
- Flag Logo

- Location within the U.S. state of Iowa
- Coordinates: 42.077951°N 91.597674°W
- Country: United States
- State: Iowa
- Founded: December 21, 1837 (created); June 1, 1839 (organized)
- Named for: Lewis F. Linn
- Seat: Cedar Rapids
- Largest city: Cedar Rapids

Area
  - Total: 724.669 sq mi (1,876.88 km^{2})
  - Land: 717.013 sq mi (1,857.06 km^{2})
  - Water: 7.656 sq mi (19.83 km^{2}) 1.06%

Population (2020)
  - Estimate (2025): 232,028 ▲
- Time zone: UTC−6 (Central)
  - Summer (DST): UTC−5 (CDT)
- Area code: 319
- Congressional district: 2nd
- Iowa county number 57

Linn County is a county located in the U.S. state of Iowa. As of the 2020 census, the population was 230,299, and was estimated to be 232,028 in 2025, making it the second-most populous county in Iowa. The county seat and the largest city is Cedar Rapids. Linn County is named in honor of Senator Lewis F. Linn of Missouri. Linn County is included in the Cedar Rapids, IA Metropolitan statistical area.

== History ==
The earliest inhabitants of Linn County, prior to Anglo settlement, were the Sac and Fox tribes. Relations were described by 20th century historians as amicable. Native Americans provided food and furs to whites in exchange for merchandise.

Linn County was created as a named but unorganized area on December 21, 1837, as a part of Wisconsin Territory. It became part of Iowa Territory on July 3, 1838, when the territory was organized. Linn County was organized by the first legislative assembly of the Iowa Territory on January 15, 1839. A site was selected for its first county seat along Indian Creek, and was named Marion, after the Revolutionary War general Francis Marion. As early as 1855, there were debates over moving the county seat to the fast-growing Cedar Rapids, southwest of Marion, but it was not until November 6, 1919, that there were enough votes in favor of the move (9,960 to 4,823). The first rail line was built through Cedar Rapids in 1859, and made the town (and the county) a major commercial hub in eastern Iowa.

Many areas of the county were damaged by the flooding of Cedar River in June 2008, and again during the August 2020 Midwest derecho.

Linn County was the site of a mass murder, when on June 5, 2024, Luke Truesdell bludgeoned to death four people with a metal pipe in a pole barn. He was later apprehended and stood trial for the murders. He was later convicted of the murders on November 17, 2025, and was sentenced to 3 life sentences. It is one of Iowa's worst mass murders in over two decades, as well as the first quadruple murder recorded in Linn County's history.

== Geography ==
According to the United States Census Bureau, the county has a total area of 724.669 square miles (1,876.88 km^{2}), of which 717.013 square miles (1,857.06 km^{2}) is land and 7.656 square miles (19.83 km^{2}) (1.06%) is water. It is the 10th largest county in Iowa by total area.

=== Major highways ===
- Interstate 380
- Iowa Highway 27
- U.S. Highway 30
- U.S. Highway 151
- U.S. Highway 218
- Iowa Highway 1
- Iowa Highway 13

=== Transit ===
- 380 Express
- Cedar Rapids Transit

=== Adjacent counties ===
- Benton County (west)
- Buchanan County (northwest)
- Cedar County (southeast)
- Delaware County (northeast)
- Iowa County (southwest)
- Johnson County (south)
- Jones County (east)

== Demographics ==
Historical population
Census	Pop.	Note	%±
1850	5,444		—
1860	18,947		248.0%
1870	31,080		64.0%
1880	37,237		19.8%
1890	45,303		21.7%
1900	55,392		22.3%
1910	60,720		9.6%
1920	74,004		21.9%
1930	82,336		11.3%
1940	89,142		8.3%
1950	104,274		17.0%
1960	136,899		31.3%
1970	163,213		19.2%
1980	169,775		4.0%
1990	168,767		−0.6%
2000	191,701		13.6%
2010	211,226		10.2%
2020	230,299		9.0%
2025 (est.)	232,028	▲	0.8%
U.S. Decennial Census; 1790–1960 1900–1990; 1990–2000 2010–2020

As of the second quarter of 2025, the median home value in Linn County was $241,994.

As of the 2024 American Community Survey, there are 97,117 estimated households in Linn County with an average of 2.33 persons per household. The county has a median household income of $74,709. Approximately 9.2% of the county's population lives at or below the poverty line. Linn County has an estimated 65.0% employment rate, with 33.3% of the population holding a bachelor's degree or higher and 93.7% holding a high school diploma. There were 104,556 housing units at an average density of 145.82 per square mile (56.3/km^{2}).

The top five reported languages (people were allowed to report up to two languages, thus the figures will generally add to more than 100%) were English (92.1%), Spanish (2.0%), Indo-European (2.4%), Asian and Pacific Islander (1.5%), and Other (2.1%).

The median age in the county was 39.6 years.

Linn County, Iowa – racial and ethnic composition Note: the US Census treats Hispanic/Latino as an ethnic category. This table excludes Latinos from the racial categories and assigns them to a separate category. Hispanics/Latinos may be of any race.
Race / ethnicity (NH = non-Hispanic)	Pop. 1980	Pop. 1990	Pop. 2000	Pop. 2010	Pop. 2020
White alone (NH)	164,399 (96.83%)	162,087 (96.04%)	178,449 (93.09%)	188,592 (89.28%)	187,911 (81.59%)
Black or African American alone (NH)	2,715 (1.60%)	3,288 (1.95%)	4,857 (2.53%)	8,160 (3.86%)	16,200 (7.03%)
Native American or Alaska Native alone (NH)	268 (0.16%)	333 (0.20%)	383 (0.20%)	479 (0.23%)	382 (0.17%)
Asian alone (NH)	727 (0.43%)	1,373 (0.81%)	2,614 (1.36%)	3,783 (1.79%)	5,345 (2.32%)
Pacific Islander alone (NH)	—	—	89 (0.05%)	162 (0.08%)	522 (0.23%)
Other race alone (NH)	384 (0.23%)	95 (0.06%)	188 (0.10%)	157 (0.07%)	659 (0.29%)
Mixed race or multiracial (NH)	—	—	2,399 (1.25%)	4,359 (2.06%)	10,369 (4.50%)
Hispanic or Latino (any race)	1,282 (0.76%)	1,591 (0.94%)	2,722 (1.42%)	5,534 (2.62%)	8,911 (3.87%)
Total	169,775 (100.00%)	168,767 (100.00%)	191,701 (100.00%)	211,226 (100.00%)	230,299 (100.00%)

=== 2024 estimate ===
As of the 2024 estimate, there were 231,762 people, 97,117 households, and _ families residing in the county. The population density was 323.23 inhabitants per square mile (124.8/km^{2}). There were 104,556 housing units at an average density of 145.82 per square mile (56.3/km^{2}). The racial makeup of the county was 85.8% White (82.1% NH White), 7.4% African American, 0.3% Native American, 2.8% Asian, 0.3% Pacific Islander, _% from some other races and 3.4% from two or more races. Hispanic or Latino people of any race were 4.4% of the population.

=== 2020 census ===
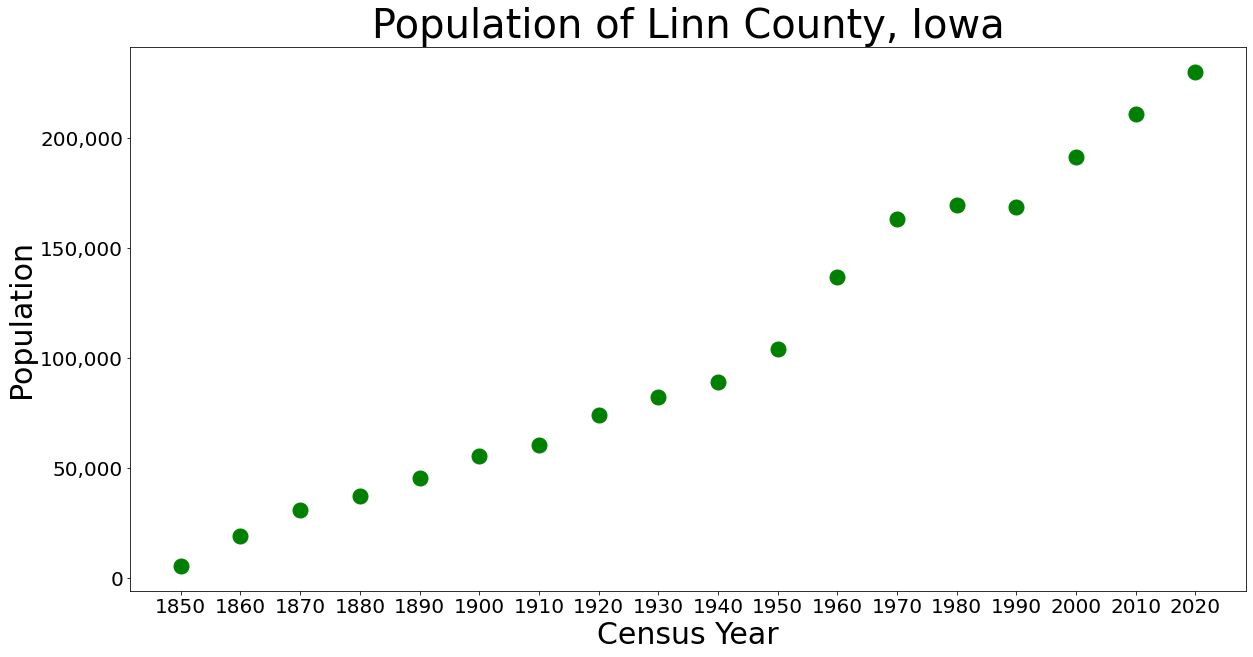
Population of Linn County from the U.S. census data

As of the 2020 census, there were 230,299 people, 94,751 households, and 58,528 families residing in the county. The population density was 321.19 inhabitants per square mile (124.0/km^{2}). There were 101,230 housing units at an average density of 141.18 per square mile (54.5/km^{2}). The racial makeup of the county was 82.78% White, 7.14% African American, 0.24% Native American, 2.33% Asian, 0.23% Pacific Islander, 1.31% from some other races and 5.96% from two or more races. Hispanic or Latino people of any race were 3.87% of the population.

The median age was 38.0 years, with 23.2% of residents under the age of 18 and 16.5% aged 65 or older. For every 100 females there were 96.4 males, and for every 100 females age 18 and over there were 94.3 males age 18 and over.

86.3% of residents lived in urban areas, while 13.7% lived in rural areas.

There were 94,751 households in the county, of which 29.1% had children under the age of 18 living in them. Of all households, 46.2% were married-couple households, 19.7% were households with a male householder and no spouse or partner present, and 26.3% were households with a female householder and no spouse or partner present. About 30.9% of all households were made up of individuals and 11.4% had someone living alone who was 65 years of age or older.

There were 101,230 housing units, of which 6.4% were vacant. Among occupied housing units, 71.0% were owner-occupied and 29.0% were renter-occupied. The homeowner vacancy rate was 1.3% and the rental vacancy rate was 9.1%.

=== 2010 census ===
As of the 2010 census, there were 211,226 people, 86,136 households, and _ families residing in the county. The population density was 294.59 inhabitants per square mile (113.7/km^{2}). There were 92,251 housing units at an average density of 128.66 per square mile (49.7/km^{2}). The racial makeup of the county was 90.85% White, 3.95% African American, 0.27% Native American, 1.80% Asian, 0.09% Pacific Islander, 0.72% from some other races and 2.34% from two or more races. Hispanic or Latino people of any race were 2.62% of the population.

=== 2000 census ===
As of the 2000 census, there were 191,701 people, 76,753 households, and 50,349 families residing in the county. The population density was 267.36 inhabitants per square mile (103.2/km^{2}). There were 80,551 housing units at an average density of 112.34 per square mile (43.4/km^{2}). The racial makeup of the county was 93.90% White, 2.57% African American, 0.22% Native American, 1.37% Asian, 0.05% Pacific Islander, 0.46% from some other races and 1.44% from two or more races. Hispanic or Latino people of any race were 1.42% of the population.

There were 76,753 households 31.80% had children under the age of 18 living with them, 53.20% were married couples living together, 9.00% had a female householder with no husband present, and 34.40% were non-families. 27.50% of households were one person and 8.90% were one person aged 65 or older. The average household size was 2.43 and the average family size was 2.99.

Age spread: 25.30% under the age of 18, 10.10% from 18 to 24, 30.30% from 25 to 44, 22.10% from 45 to 64, and 12.20% 65 or older. The median age was 35 years. For every 100 females, there were 96.10 males. For every 100 females age 18 and over, there were 93.40 males.

The median household income was $46,206 and the median family income was $56,494. Males had a median income of $38,525 versus $26,403 for females. The per capita income for the county was $22,977. About 4.30% of families and 6.50% of the population were below the poverty line, including 7.60% of those under age 18 and 6.40% of those age 65 or over.

== Government ==
The Linn County Board of Supervisors consists of three members elected by district to overlapping four-year terms.

Name	District	First elected
Kirsten Running-Marquardt	District 1	2022
Sami Scheetz	District 2	2025 (appointed)
Brandy Meisheid	District 3	2024

The Board of Supervisors serves as both the executive branch and legislative branch of Linn County government. It oversees Communications, Community Services, Engineering/Secondary Road, Facilities, Finance & Budget, Human Resources, Information Technology, LIFTS (para-transit transportation), Planning & Development, Policy & Administration, Purchasing, Risk Management, Soil & Water Conservation, Sustainability, and Veteran Services. Conservation and Public Health report to independent boards appointed by the Board of Supervisors.

The County Attorney, Auditor, Recorder, Sheriff, and Treasurer are elected independently and oversee their respective departments.

Name	Staff Directory
Nick Maybanks	Attorney
Todd Taylor	Auditor
Carolyn Siebrecht	Recorder
Brian D. Gardner	Sheriff
Brent C. Oleson	Treasurer

While Iowa shifted from competitive to firmly Republican during the Donald Trump era in the mid-to-late 2010s, Linn County remained as one of the state's few Democratic strongholds. The County last voted for a Republican for president in 1984 when Ronald Reagan won a landslide re-election. In every presidential election since 1984, the Democratic candidate won Linn County by at least 9 percent.

United States presidential election results for Linn County, Iowa
Year	Republican		Democratic		Third party(ies)	
Year	No.	%	No.	%	No.	%
1880	4,508	58.52%	2,875	37.32%	320	4.15%
1884	4,840	52.48%	4,306	46.69%	77	0.83%
1888	5,247	53.19%	4,373	44.33%	244	2.47%
1892	5,602	50.85%	5,032	45.67%	383	3.48%
1896	7,335	57.14%	5,283	41.16%	218	1.70%
1900	7,745	59.10%	5,019	38.30%	342	2.61%
1904	8,131	65.36%	3,600	28.94%	709	5.70%
1908	6,938	54.22%	5,493	42.93%	364	2.84%
1912	4,326	33.83%	5,422	42.41%	3,038	23.76%
1916	8,212	55.67%	6,131	41.56%	408	2.77%
1920	20,036	72.02%	6,932	24.92%	853	3.07%
1924	22,371	64.49%	5,941	17.13%	6,378	18.39%
1928	25,452	68.24%	11,715	31.41%	132	0.35%
1932	18,733	50.75%	17,693	47.93%	489	1.32%
1936	19,129	48.06%	19,724	49.55%	953	2.39%
1940	23,581	54.54%	19,531	45.17%	123	0.28%
1944	21,293	50.03%	21,123	49.63%	146	0.34%
1948	20,881	48.45%	20,995	48.71%	1,222	2.84%
1952	31,383	58.72%	21,818	40.83%	240	0.45%
1956	33,402	60.60%	21,667	39.31%	47	0.09%
1960	34,200	55.30%	27,614	44.65%	25	0.04%
1964	21,845	35.22%	40,106	64.66%	78	0.13%
1968	30,918	47.99%	29,898	46.40%	3,614	5.61%
1972	36,503	52.78%	31,370	45.36%	1,287	1.86%
1976	36,513	47.79%	38,252	50.07%	1,632	2.14%
1980	36,254	46.35%	31,950	40.84%	10,020	12.81%
1984	41,061	51.12%	38,528	47.97%	726	0.90%
1988	33,129	43.18%	42,993	56.04%	596	0.78%
1992	30,215	33.99%	38,567	43.39%	20,103	22.62%
1996	30,958	37.28%	45,497	54.79%	6,580	7.92%
2000	40,417	43.90%	48,897	53.11%	2,750	2.99%
2004	49,442	44.65%	60,442	54.58%	856	0.77%
2008	43,626	38.48%	68,037	60.01%	1,706	1.50%
2012	47,622	40.20%	68,581	57.90%	2,250	1.90%
2016	48,390	41.32%	58,935	50.33%	9,773	8.35%
2020	53,364	41.87%	70,874	55.61%	3,220	2.53%
2024	54,237	44.11%	66,358	53.97%	2,364	1.92%

== Communities ==
=== Cities ===
- Alburnett
- Bertram
- Cedar Rapids
- Center Point
- Central City
- Coggon
- Ely
- Fairfax
- Hiawatha
- Lisbon
- Marion
- Mount Vernon
- Palo
- Prairieburg
- Robins
- Springville
- Walford
- Walker

=== Unincorporated communities ===
- Alice
- Covington, Iowa
- Lafayette
- Toddville
- Troy Mills
- Viola
- Waubeek
- Western
- Whittier

=== Ghost towns ===
- Ivanhoe

=== Townships ===
- Bertram
- Boulder
- Brown
- Buffalo
- Clinton
- College
- Fairfax
- Fayette
- Franklin
- Grant
- Jackson
- Linn
- Maine
- Marion
- Monroe
- Otter Creek
- Putnam
- Spring Grove
- Washington

=== Population ranking ===
The population ranking of the following table is based on the 2020 census of Linn County.

† county seat

Rank	City/Town/etc.	Municipal type	Population (2020 Census)	Population (2024 Estimate)
1	† Cedar Rapids	City	137,710	137,904
2	Marion	City	41,535	42,542
3	Hiawatha	City	7,183	7,373
4	Mount Vernon	City	4,527	4,554
5	Robins	City	3,353	3,466
6	Fairfax	City	2,828	3,037
7	Center Point	City	2,579	2,580
8	Ely	City	2,328	2,412
9	Lisbon	City	2,233	2,246
10	Palo	City	1,407	1,592
11	Walford (partially in Benton County)	City	1,366	1,378
12	Central City	City	1,264	1,259
13	Springville	City	1,154	1,193
14	Coggon	City	701	699
15	Walker	City	688	693
16	Alburnett	City	675	692
17	Bertram	City	269	296
18	Prairieburg	City	160	156

== Education ==
School districts include:

- Alburnett Community School District, Alburnett
- Anamosa Community School District, Anamosa
- Cedar Rapids Community School District, Cedar Rapids
- Center Point–Urbana Community School District, Center Point
- Central City Community School District, Central City
- College Community School District, Cedar Rapids
- Linn-Mar Community School District, Marion
- Lisbon Community School District, Lisbon
- Marion Independent School District, Marion
- Monticello Community School District, Monticello
- Mount Vernon Community School District, Mount Vernon
- North Linn Community School District, Troy Mills
- Solon Community School District, Solon
- Springville Community School District, Springville

== See also ==
- National Register of Historic Places listings in Linn County, Iowa
- USS Linn County (LST-900)
