= List of tallest buildings in Cedar Rapids =

Tall buildings in Cedar Rapids
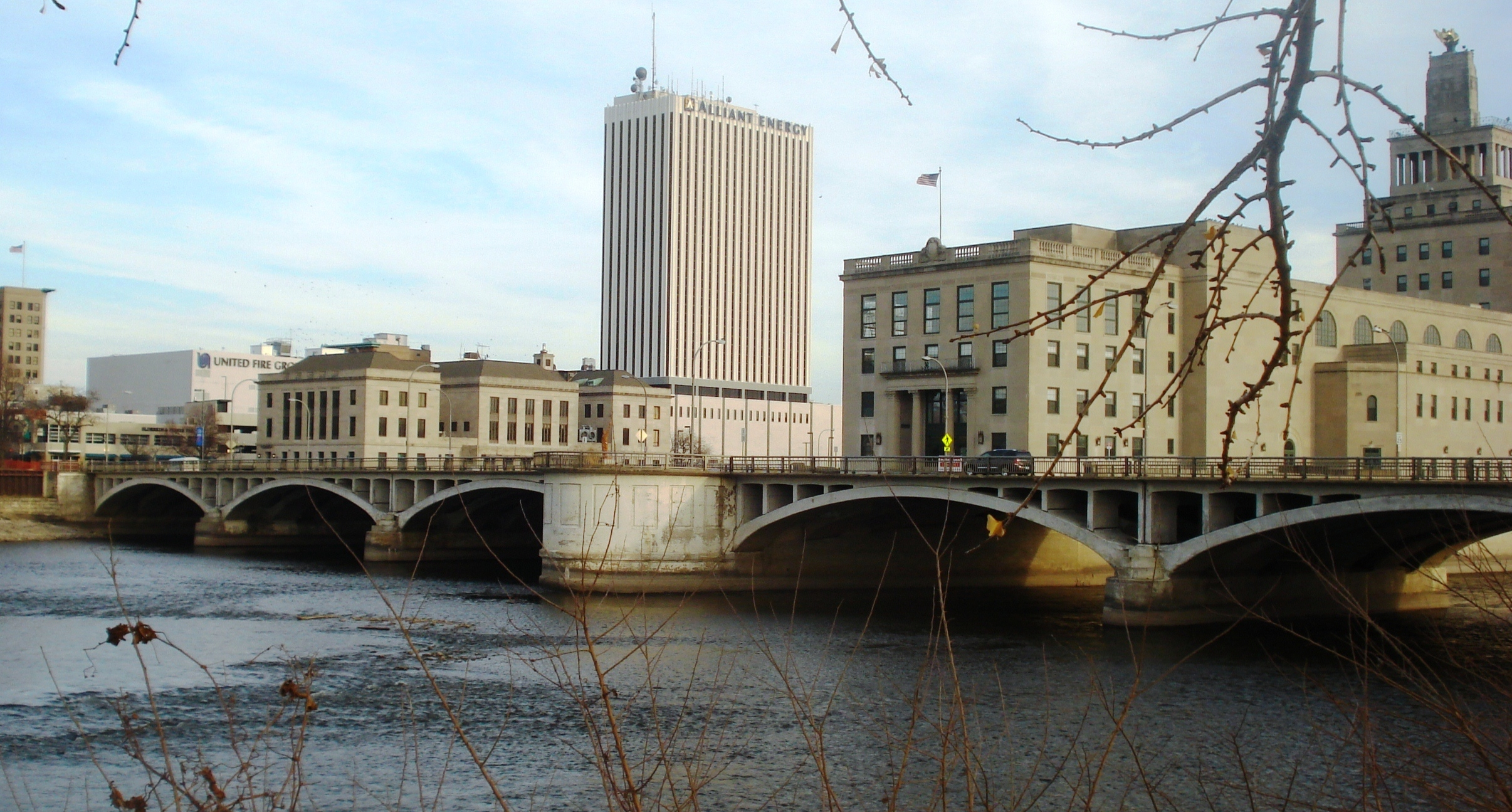
- Skyline of Cedar Rapids in 2011
- Tallest building: Alliant Tower (1972)
- Tallest building height: 285 ft (87 m)

Number of tall buildings (2026)
- 20 stories or more: 2
- Taller than 50 m (164 ft): 8
- Taller than 75 m (246 ft): 1

Cedar Rapids is a city in the U.S. state of Iowa which lies on the Cedar River. The city has a population of 137,927 people of as of January 2026, making it the second largest city in Iowa. The city has 12 buildings which stand over 130 ft (40 m) tall. As of January 2026, the tallest building in Cedar Rapids is the Alliant Tower, which stands 285 ft (87 m) tall.

The history of high-rises in Cedar Rapids began in the late 1920s, when a building boom occurred. The boom to the construction of the 166 ft (51 m) tall US Bank Building in 1926, which became the tallest building in the city. The US Bank Building was surpassed in 1927 by the 190 ft (58 m) tall Quaker Oats Plant. The city would experience a decline in the number of high-rises being built from the 1930s to the 1960s. However, in the 1970s, the city experienced a second building boom. During this time the 285 ft (87 m) tall Alliant Tower was constructed, surpassing the Quaker Oats Plant as tallest building in Ceder Rapids, as well as the tallest building in Iowa outside of Des Moines.

The most recently completed high-rise is the 180 ft (55 m) tall CRST Center which was built in 2016.

== Map of tallest buildings ==
The map below shows the locations of the buildings in Cedar Rapids that stand over 130 ft (40 m) in height. Each marker is given a number based on the buildings ranking in the list. The color of each marker represents the decade that the building was completed in.

Buildings in Cedar Rapids that stand over 130 ft (40 m).
- 1950s and before
- 1960s
- 1970s
- 1980s
- 1990s
- 2000s
- 2010s
- 2020s
1 Alliant Tower
2 Cedar River Tower
3 Plaza 425
4 DoubleTree by Hilton Hotel Cedar Rapids
5 Quaker Oats Plant
6 CRST Center
7 Veterans Memorial Building
8 US Bank Building
9 500 Second Avenue SE
10 Mercy Medical Center
11 Geneva Towers
12 The Roosevelt

== Tallest buildings ==
There are 12 buildings in Cedar Rapids that stand at least 130 ft (40 m) tall when including spires and other architectural details are included in the height of a building but not antennas.

Tallest building in Cedar Rapids upon completion

Tallest buildings
Rank	Name	Image	Location	Height	Floor Count	Year	Use	Notes
1	Alliant Tower	Alliant_Tower_01	41°58′37″N 91°40′06″W	285 ft (87 m)	21	1972	Office	Tallest building in Cedar Rapids since 1972.
2	Cedar River Tower	Cedar_River_Tower	41°58′44″N 91°40′12″W	237 ft (72 m)	25	1974	Residential	Tallest residential building in Cedar Rapids.
3	Plaza 425	Plaza_425	41°58′32″N 91°39′57″W	207 ft (63 m)	14	1983	Office	
4	DoubleTree by Hilton Hotel Cedar Rapids	DoubleTree_by_Hilton_-_Cedar_Rapids,_Iowa	41°58′47″N 91°40′02″W	197 ft (60 m)	16	1979	Hotel	
5	Quaker Oats Plant	Quaker_Oats,_Cedar_Rapids,_Iowa_(64587)	41°58′54″N 91°40′15″W	190 ft (58 m)	13	1927	Industrial	Largest cereal mill in the world. Tallest building in Cedar Rapids from 1927 to 1972.
6	CRST Center	CRST_Center	41°58′36″N 91°40′08″W	180 ft (55 m)	11	2016	Office	Tallest building in Cedar Rapids built in the 2010s.
7	Veterans Memorial Building	Cedar Rapids City Hall	41°58′35″N 91°40′15″W	175 ft (53 m)	10	1928	Government	Served as City Hall until a major flood in 2008.
8	US Bank Building	U.S._Bank_building_Cedar_Rapids_-_panoramio	41°58′43″N 91°40′02″W	166 ft (51 m)	12	1926	Office	Tallest building in Cedar Rapids from 1926 to 1927.
9	500 Second Avenue SE	500 Second Avenue SE Dairy Queen, Cedar Rapids, June 12, 2008 (cropped)	41°58′48″N 91°39′52″W	161 ft (49 m)	10	1980	Office	
10	Mercy Medical Center	Mercy Medical Center, Cedar Rapids Iowa	41°58′41″N 91°39′20″W	152 ft (46 m)	10	1969	Hospital	
11	Geneva Towers		41°58′35″N 91°39′50″W	135 ft (41 m)	14	1971	Residential	
12	The Roosevelt	Roosevelt-Hotel	41°58′45″N 91°40′06″W	132 ft (40 m)	12	1927	Residential	Individually listed on the National Register of Historic Places in 1991. Part of the Cedar Rapids Central Business District Commercial Historic District.

== Timeline of tallest buildings ==
Timeline of tallest buildings
Name	Image	Years as tallest	Height	Floors	Ref(s)
US Bank Building	U.S._Bank_building_Cedar_Rapids_-_panoramio	1926–1927	166 ft (51 m)	12	
Quaker Oats Plant	Quaker_Oats,_Cedar_Rapids,_Iowa_(64587)	1927–1972	190 ft (58 m)	13	
Alliant Tower	Alliant_Tower_02	1972–Present	285 ft (87 m)	21	

== See also ==
- List of tallest buildings in Iowa
