= Silos & Smokestacks National Heritage Area =

United States National Heritage Area in Iowa

Silos & Smokestacks National Heritage Area (SSNHA), also known as America's Agricultural Heritage Partnership, is one of 62 federally designated National Heritage Areas in the United States, and an Affiliated Area of the National Park Service. Through the development of a network of sites, programs and events, SSNHA's mission is to interpret farm life, agribusiness and rural communities-past and present.

Silos & Smokestacks was designated as a national heritage area in 1996. The name is intended to reflect both the farms and industries that constitute agribusiness. The Silos & Smokestacks region covers the northeast third of the state of Iowa, including thirty-seven counties. The cities of Des Moines, Cedar Rapids, Davenport, Waterloo, Dubuque, and Iowa City are all located within the region. The National Park Service recognizes over 90 community and privately operated sites in the area that interpret the story of American agriculture. These range from dairy farms and museums to vineyards and tractor assembly plants. Included in the area are the Amana Colonies, Living History Farms, and Brucemore, a few of Iowa's best known tourist attractions. Silos & Smokestacks also includes several state-designated scenic byways and the nationally designated Great River Road along the west bank of the Mississippi River.

== Heritage sites ==
The Heritage Area includes the following:

Examples of designated sites
Site	Type	Location
1876 Coralville Schoolhouse	history	Coralville, Iowa
African American Museum of Iowa	museum	Cedar Rapids, Iowa
Brucemore	house	Cedar Rapids, Iowa
Calkins Nature Area	nature	Hardin County, Iowa
Carrie Lane Chapman Catt Girlhood Home	house	Charles City, Iowa
Cedar Rock the Walter House	house	Buchanan County, Iowa
Clinton County Historical Museum	museum	Clinton County, Iowa
Driftless Area Education and Visitor Center	nature	Lansing, Iowa
Effigy Mounds National Monument	Native Americans	Harpers Ferry, Iowa
Fontana Interpretive Nature Center	nature	Hazleton, Iowa
Fort Atkinson State Preserve	nature	Fort Atkinson, Iowa
Heartland Museum	museum	Clarion, Iowa
Historic Limestone Insane Asylum	history	Jackson County, Iowa
Iowa State Fair	agriculture	Des Moines, Iowa
John Deere Tractor and Engine Museum	agriculture	Waterloo, Iowa
Johnson County Poor Farm and Asylum Historic District	history	Johnson County, Iowa
Laura Ingalls Wilder Park and Museum	history	Burr Oak, Iowa
Mathias Ham House	house	Dubuque, Iowa
Mines of Spain State Recreation Area	nature	Dubuque County, Iowa
National Cattle Congress	agriculture	Waterloo, Iowa
Neal Smith National Wildlife Refuge	nature	Jasper County, Iowa
Plum Grove Historic House	house	Iowa City, Iowa
Putnam Museum	museum	Davenport, Iowa
