= Alliant Tower =

Skyscraper in Cedar Rapids

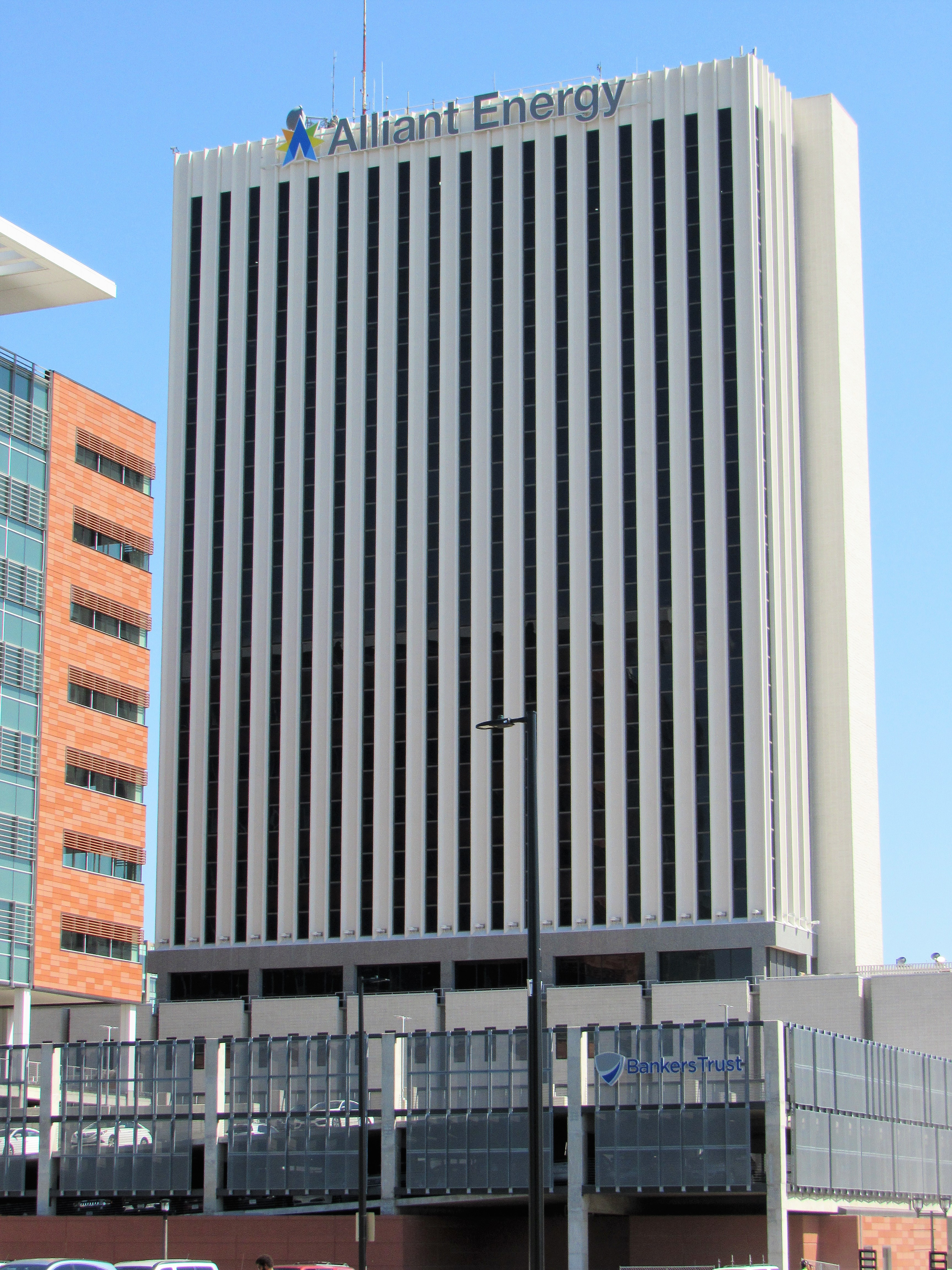
- Alliant_Tower_01 Alliant Tower in 2019.

- Location within Iowa Alliant Tower (the United States)

General information
- Status: Completed
- Type: Office
- Architectural style: Modern
- Location: 200 1st Street SE, Cedar Rapids, Iowa, United States
- Coordinates: 41°58′37″N 91°40′06″W
- Completed: 1972

Height
- Roof: 285 ft (87 m)

Technical details
- Floor count: 21

Design and construction
- Architects: Kelley-Marshall & Associates

Alliant Tower (also known as the Iowa Electric Tower and the IES Tower) is a 285 ft (87 m) tall modern office building located on 200 1st Street SE in Downtown Cedar Rapids. The building has 21 floors and was built in 1972. Upon its completion, it became the tallest building in Cedar Rapids, surpassing the 190 ft (58 m) tall Quaker Oats Plant. As of January 2026, the building still holds the title as the tallest building in Cedar Rapids. The building also is the tallest building in Iowa outside of Des Moines. The building was designed by Kelley-Marshall & Associates, who also designed the Liberty Tower in South Bend, and the now demolished 420 Main St. in Evansville.

In 2018, Alliant Energy would begin to light up the tower with certain colors at night for different events, such as the 4th of July, Breast Cancer Awareness Month, Columbus Day, Martin Luther King Jr. Day, and certain Pride Events. In 2025, Alliant Energy stopped accepting special lighting requests for the tower, only lighting up the tower on federal holidays and in the company's colors, due to the major influx of requests.

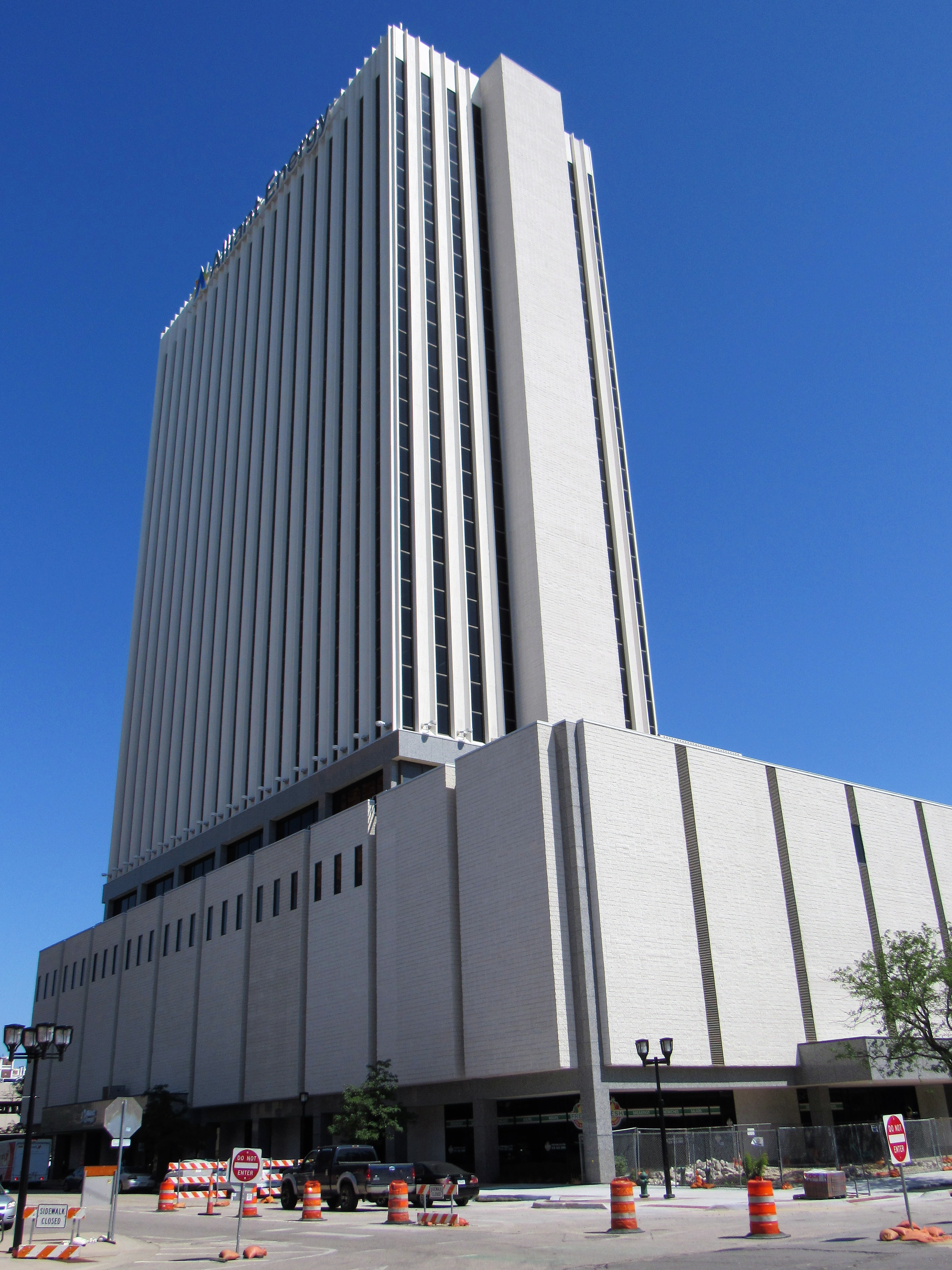
The Alliant Tower viewed from the Street.

== See also ==
- List of tallest buildings in Cedar Rapids
- List of tallest buildings in Iowa
- Alliant Energy
- Veterans Memorial Building (Cedar Rapids, Iowa)
