= Glenn M. and Edith Averill House =

Historic house in Iowa, United States

- U.S. National Register of Historic Places
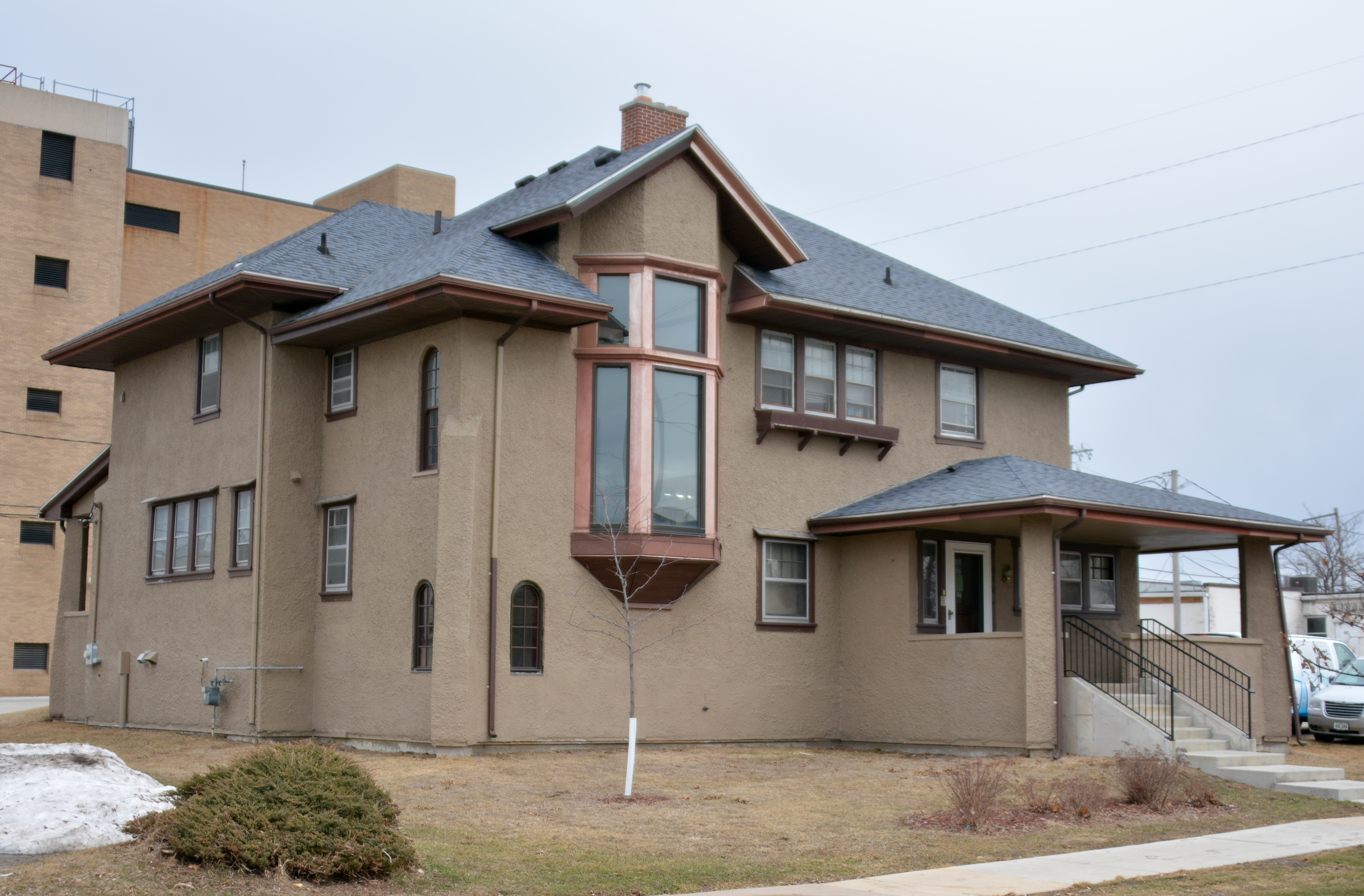

- Location within Iowa Location within the United States
- Location: 616 4th Ave., SE; Cedar Rapids, Iowa
- Coordinates: 41°58′45.2″N 91°39′40.6″W
- Area: less than one acre
- Built: 1905-1906
- Architect: Josselyn and Taylor
- Architectural style: Queen Anne
- NRHP reference No.: 15000472
- Added to NRHP: July 27, 2015

The Glenn M. and Edith Averill House is a historic building located in Cedar Rapids, Iowa, United States. Designed by local architectural firm Josselyn & Taylor, it was completed in 1906 in a combination of the Queen Anne style and the American Craftsman style. It replaced a smaller house that was located on its original lot at 1113 2nd Avenue, SE. The Averill's lived here until 1913 when they moved into a new residence and rented out this home. In 1924 this house was sold to the Phi Alpha Pi fraternity. Later, the house was divided into apartments, and it was then used by several different businesses. St. Luke's Hospital acquired this and several other houses for a new medical pavilion. It was bought by Charles Jones and saved from being torn down. The house was moved to its current location on Fourth Avenue, SE, and renovated according to the Secretary of the Interior's Standards for Rehabilitation. It was listed on the National Register of Historic Places in 2015.
