= Iowa Building =

- U.S. National Register of Historic Places
- U.S. Historic district – Contributing property
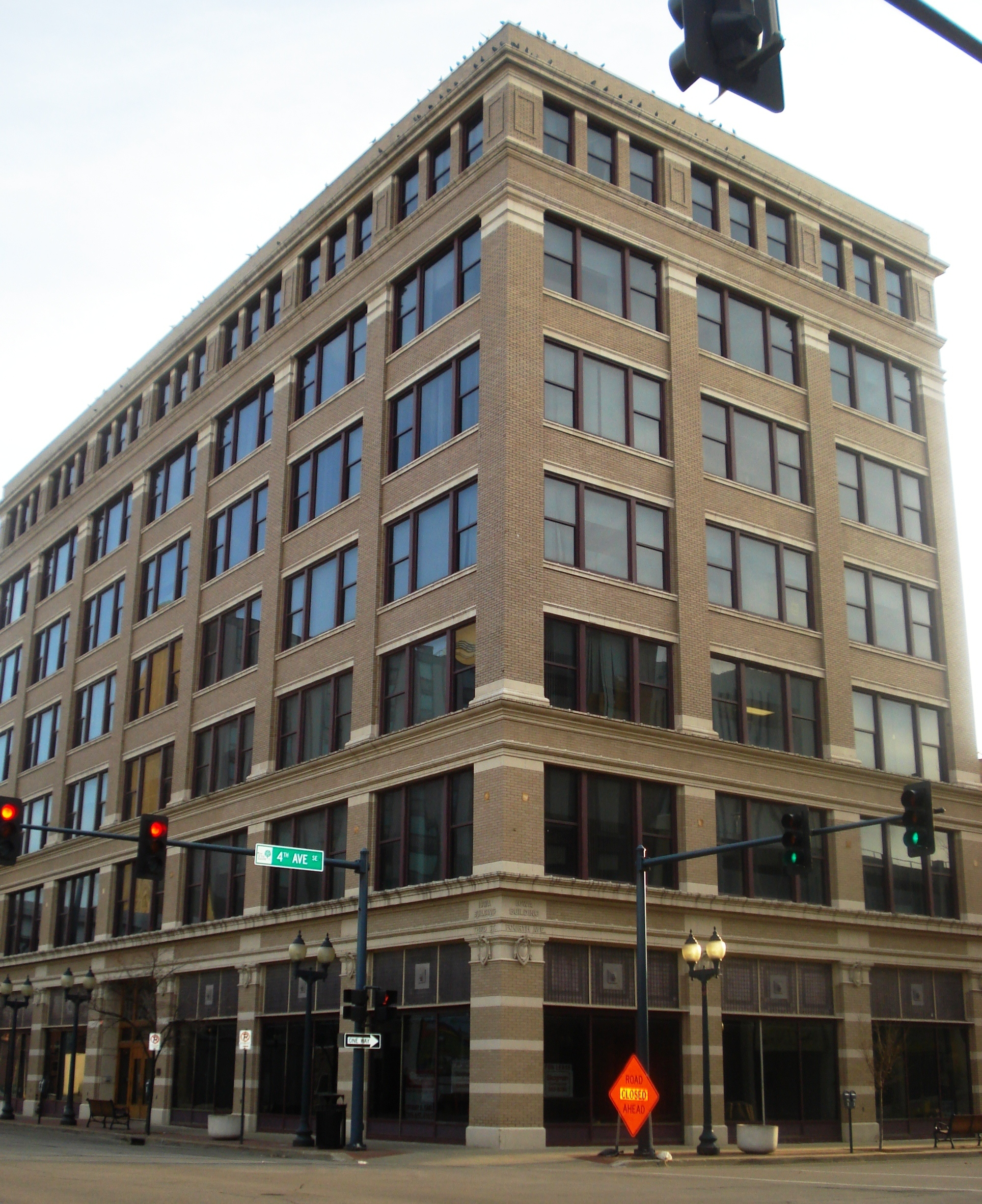

- Location within Iowa Location within the United States
- Location: 221 4th Ave., SE; Cedar Rapids, Iowa
- Coordinates: 41°58′36″N 91°39′53″W
- Area: less than one acre
- Built: 1913-1914
- Architectural style: Renaissance Revival
- Part of: Cedar Rapids Central Business District Commercial Historic District (ID15000757)
- NRHP reference No.: 83000385
- Added to NRHP: February 17, 1983

The Iowa Building is a historic structure located in downtown Cedar Rapids, Iowa, United States. It was individually listed on the National Register of Historic Places in 1983. In 2015 it was included as a contributing property in the Cedar Rapids Central Business District Commercial Historic District.

== History ==
The building is seven stories tall and rises 102 feet (31 m) above the ground. Seven construction workers were killed in 1913 when the top two floors collapsed during construction. The building was completed the following year. It housed a millinery company named the Lyman Company until the building was bought and renamed in 1933.
