= Josselyn & Taylor =

American architecture firm

Practice information
- Founders: Henry S. Josselyn FAIA; Eugene H. Taylor FAIA
- Founded: 1882
- Location: Cedar Rapids, Iowa

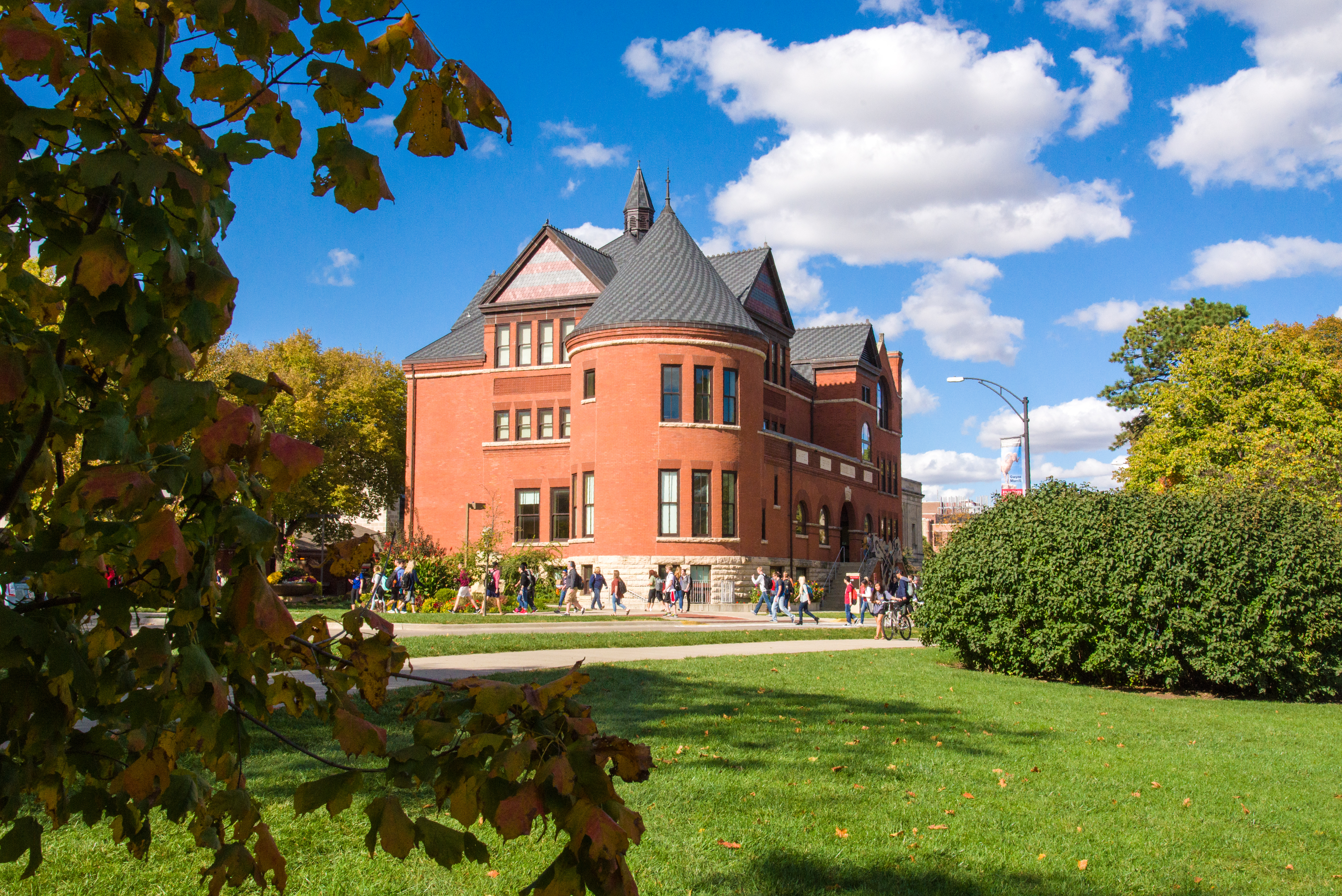
Morrill Hall of Iowa State University, designed by Josselyn & Taylor in the Richardsonian Romanesque style and completed in 1891.

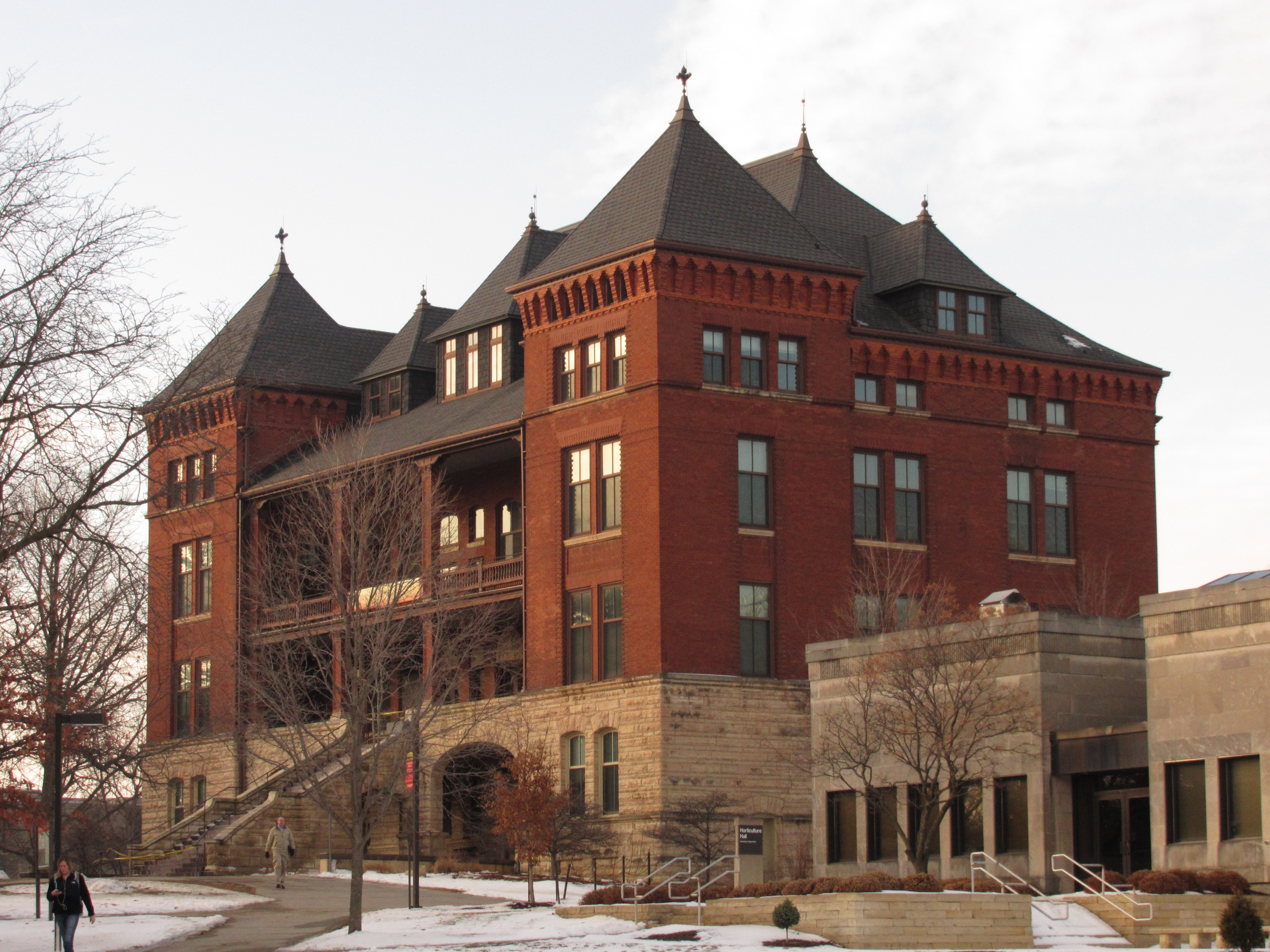
Catt Hall of Iowa State University, designed by Josselyn & Taylor in the Richardsonian Romanesque style and completed in 1892.

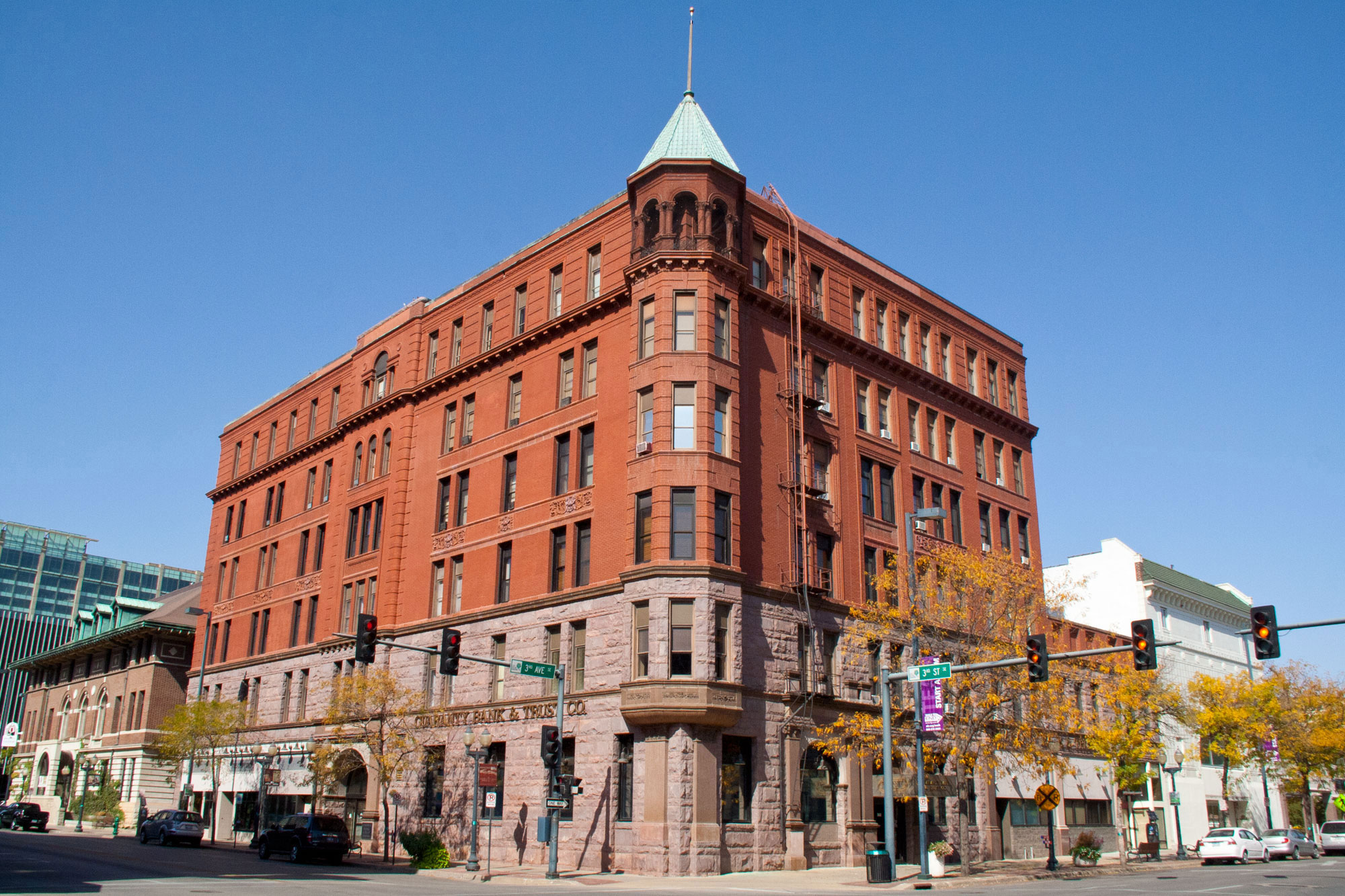
The Cedar Rapids Savings Bank Building in Cedar Rapids, designed by Josselyn & Taylor in the Italian Renaissance Revival style and completed in 1896.

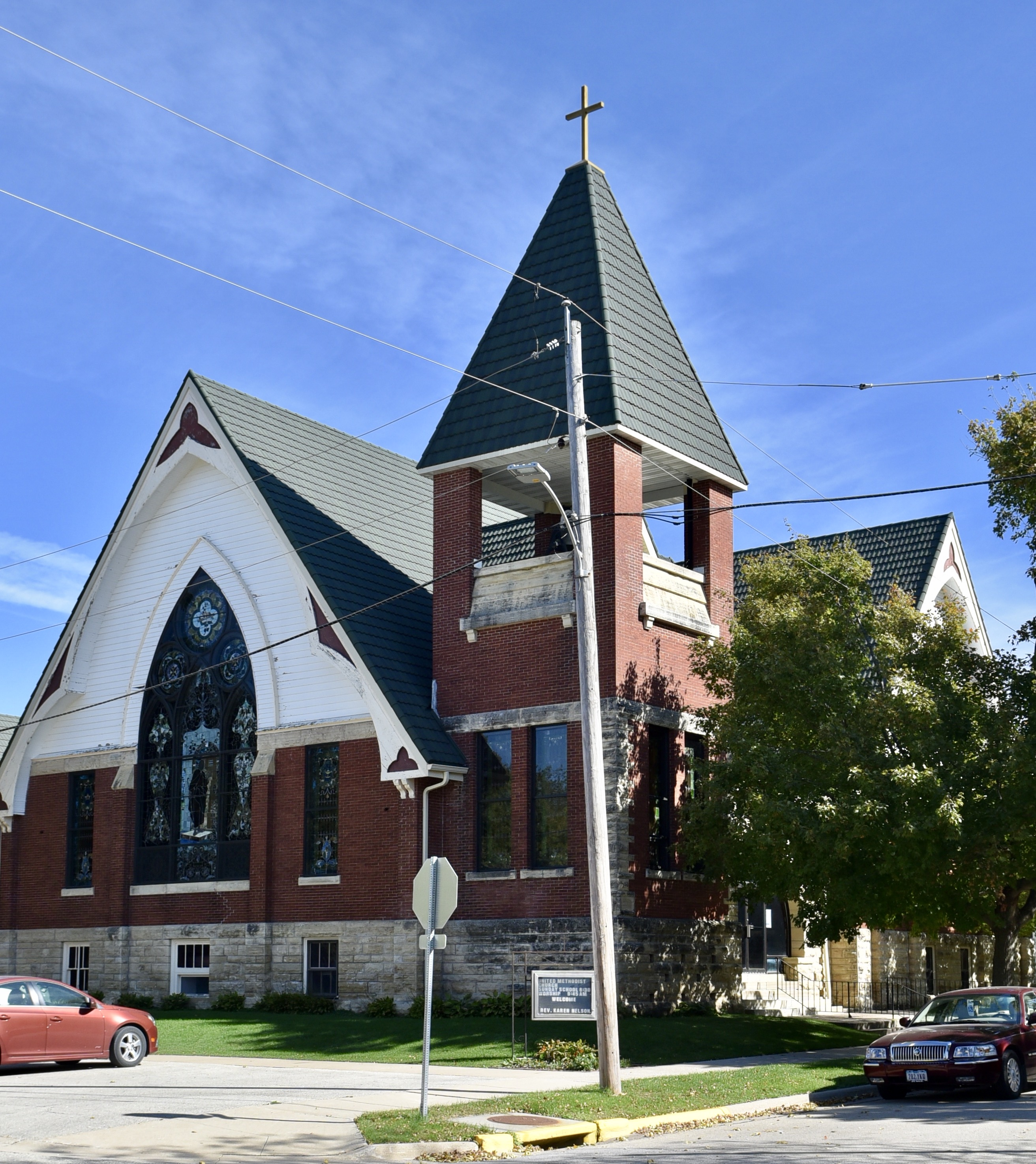
The Lisbon United Methodist Church, designed by Josselyn & Taylor in the Gothic Revival style and completed in 1899.

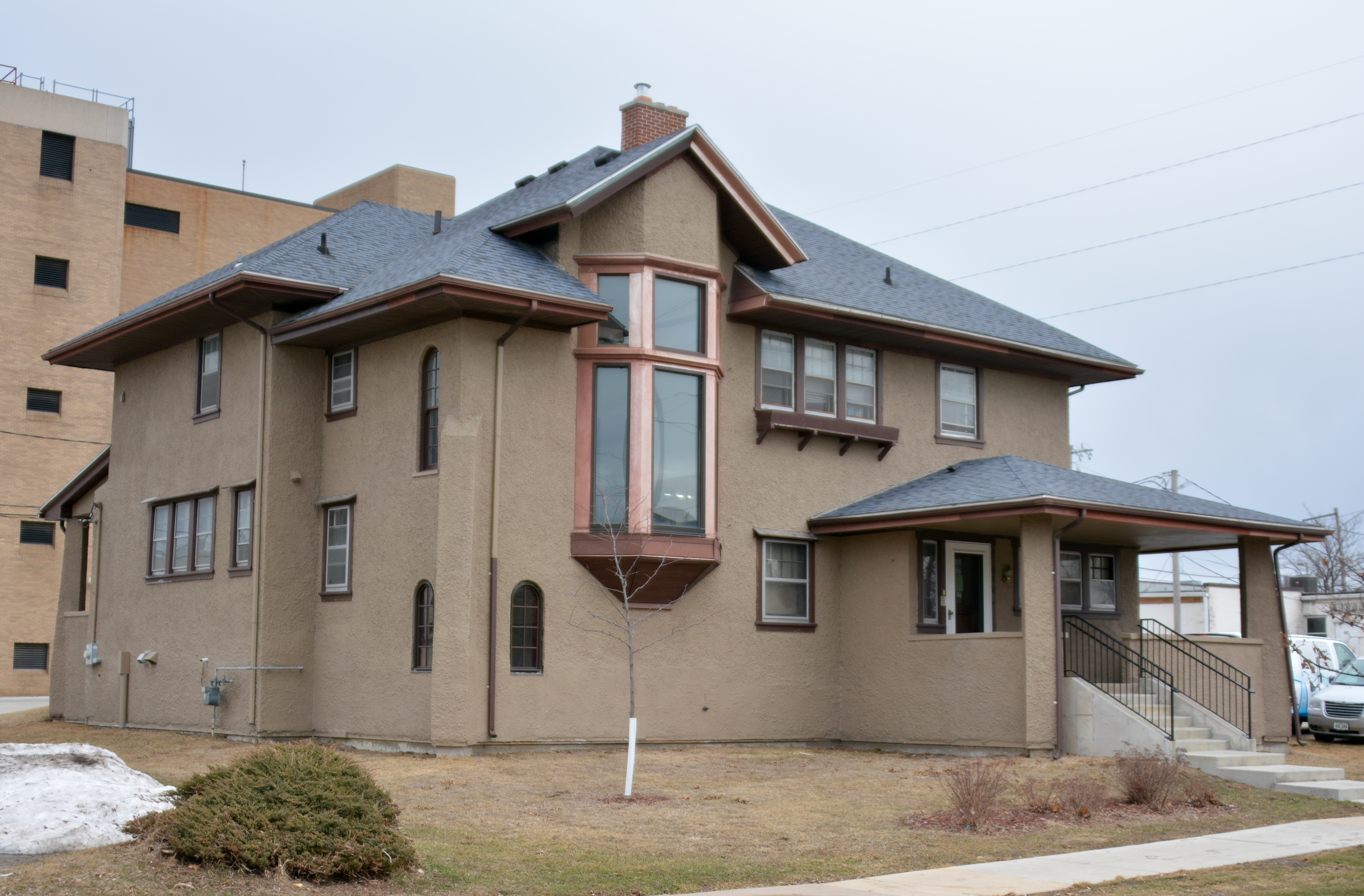
The Glenn M. and Edith Averill House in Cedar Rapids, designed by Josselyn & Taylor in the Arts and Crafts style and completed in 1906.

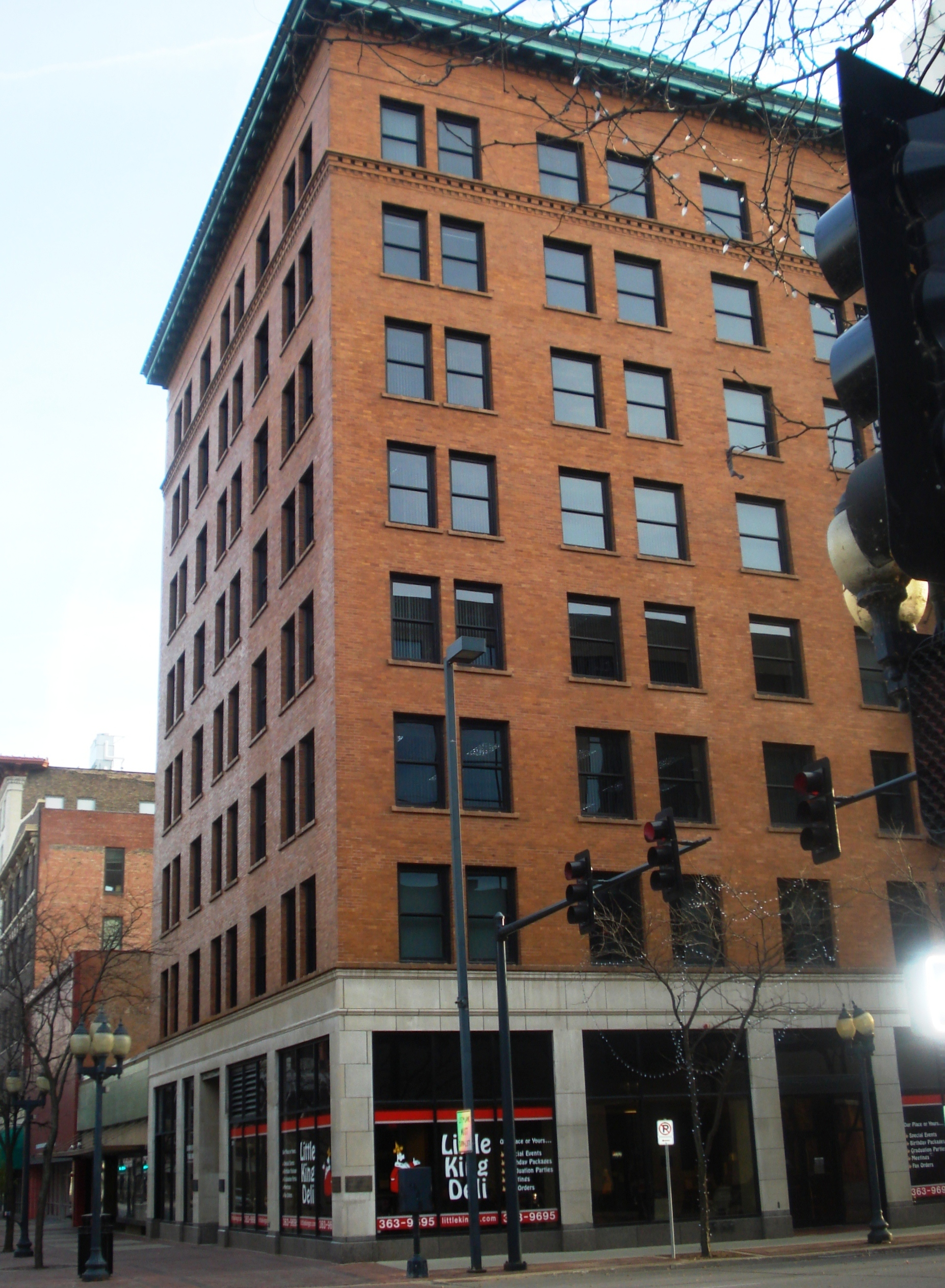
The Security Building in Cedar Rapids, designed by Josselyn & Taylor in the Commercial Style and completed in 1908.

Josselyn & Taylor was an architectural firm based in Cedar Rapids, Iowa. It was founded in 1882 as the partnership of architects Henry S. Josselyn and Eugene H. Taylor. They were the first academically trained architects to practice in Iowa.

== History ==
The firm of Josselyn & Taylor was formed in 1882 by architects Henry S. Josselyn and Eugene H. Taylor, who had been classmates at the Massachusetts Institute of Technology. The firm initially had two offices, in Cedar Rapids and Des Moines. Josselyn remained in Cedar Rapids, where he had been practicing since 1881, and Taylor located in Des Moines. In 1885 Jossslyn's father, George Josselyn, joined the firm as chief superintendent, though he was not a partner. In 1886 they gave up the Des Moines office and consolidated the firm in Cedar Rapids.

For about thirty years, Josselyn & Taylor was the leading architectural firm in Cedar Rapids. They designed buildings for Grinnell College and Iowa State University, the Cedar Rapids public library, churches, office buildings, private homes and the Iowa state buildings at the World's Columbian Exposition in Chicago and the Trans-Mississippi Exposition in Omaha. They also supervised construction of Brucemore after the original architect was unable to complete the project. George Josselyn died in July 1898, and Taylor died in October 1924 following an accident. Josselyn continued alone until October 1925, when he formed the Josselyn–Todd Company with architect Benjamin H. Todd. Josselyn retired from practice in 1929.

== Partner biographies ==
=== Henry S. Josselyn ===
Henry Saville Josselyn FAIA (August 15, 1849 – March 1, 1934) was born in Dayton, Ohio, to George Josselyn, a contractor and builder, and Anna Josselyn, née Broadwell. The family lived in Dayton until 1855 and thereafter in Mount Pleasant, Iowa, and in Illinois before settling in Independence, Iowa, in 1868. George Josselyn was superintendent of the state hospitals in both Mount Pleasant and Independence. Josselyn worked as a clerk for his father and was educated at the Massachusetts Institute of Technology, where he studied as a special student in architecture in 1876–77, though he left after a year of the two-year course. After additional experience in offices in Chicago and Des Moines, and travel in Europe, he established himself as an architect in Independence in partnership with his father. In 1881 he moved to Cedar Rapids, where he managed a branch office of the firm until forming his partnership with Taylor.

Josselyn was married to Mae Reitler in 1884. They had three children, two sons and one daughter. In 1886 he joined the Western Association of Architects, which merged with the American Institute of Architects (AIA) in 1889. Like all members of both organizations, Josselyn was made a Fellow. He withdrew from the AIA in 1892 but rejoined as an Iowa chapter member in 1904. He was a long-standing member of the Grace Episcopal Church of Cedar Rapids, the building of which Josselyn & Taylor had expanded. He died in Cedar Rapids at the age of 84.

=== Eugene H. Taylor ===
Eugene Hartwell Taylor FAIA (October 23, 1853 – October 29, 1924) was born in Denmark, Iowa, to Hartwell J. Taylor, a farmer, and Harriet Taylor, née Wilson. Taylor was educated in the local public schools before going on to Grinnell College, graduating in 1876. He then entered MIT as a special student in architecture in the same course as Josselyn. Unlike Josselyn he completed the course, in 1878, and thereafter worked for architects in Chicago and elsewhere before forming his partnership with Josselyn.

Taylor was married in 1886 to Mary Woodworth of Berlin, Connecticut. They had two children, both daughters. Taylor was a long-time member and supporter of the AIA. He joined the organization in 1884 and, like Josselyn, became a Fellow in 1889. In 1903 he was a founding member of the Iowa chapter and served as its first president. He thereafter served as chapter secretary and treasurer for nearly twenty years. He was a founder of the Civic Improvement League of Cedar Rapids, sat on the board of the YMCA and was a member of the First Congregational Church of Cedar Rapids. In his later years Taylor was involved with proposals for the improvement of the river front. He died in Cedar Rapids at the age of 71, after an automobile struck the bicycle he was riding.

== Legacy ==
Josselyn and Taylor were the first academically trained architects to practice in Iowa. They established their practice in Cedar Rapids at a time when it was expanding rapidly. According to local historian Mark Stoffer Hunter, they "ushered in a new era of architectural design ... [and] created a real sense of urban sophistication for Cedar Rapids. They were really important to the development of the city. Cedar Rapids would not have taken that next step in development without them."

A number of its works are listed on the National Register of Historic Places.

== Architectural works ==
- 1886 – Brucemore, 2160 Linden Dr SE, Cedar Rapids, Iowa
  - A site of the National Trust for Historic Preservation, also NRHP-listed.
- 1888 – Kimball Building, 2nd Ave and 3rd St SE, Cedar Rapids, Iowa
  - Destroyed by fire in 1916.
- 1888 – YMCA, 1st Ave and 1st St NE, Cedar Rapids, Iowa
  - Demolished.
- 1891 – First Congregational Church, 2nd Ave and 5th St SE, Cedar Rapids, Iowa
  - Demolished.
- 1891 – Granby Building, 230 Second Street SE, Cedar Rapids, Iowa
- 1891 – Morrill Hall, Iowa State University, Ames, Iowa
  - NRHP-listed.
- 1892 – Catt Hall, Iowa State University, Ames, Iowa
  - NRHP-listed.
- 1893 – Iowa State Building, World's Columbian Exposition, Chicago
  - Temporary building, demolished.
- 1896 – Cedar Rapids Savings Bank Building, 222 3rd St SE, Cedar Rapids, Iowa
- 1897 - Iowa Hospital For The Insane, Cherokee, Iowa, 51012 Cherokee Mental Health Institute
- 1898 – Iowa State Building, Trans-Mississippi Exposition, Omaha, Nebraska
  - Temporary building, demolished.
- 1899 – Lewis Hotel, 231 W Main St. Cherokee, Iowa
  - NRHP-listed.
- 1899 – Lisbon United Methodist Church, 200 E Market St. Lisbon, Iowa
  - NRHP-listed.
- 1903 – Mercy Hospital, 701 10th St SE, Cedar Rapids, Iowa
  - Demolished.
- 1903 – Montrose Hotel, 3rd St and 3rd Ave SE, Cedar Rapids, Iowa
  - Demolished in 1988.
- 1905 – Cedar Rapids Public Library (former), 410 3rd Ave SE, Cedar Rapids, Iowa
  - Now part of Cedar Rapids Museum of Art.
- 1906 – Glenn M. and Edith Averill House, 616 4th Ave SE, Cedar Rapids, Iowa
  - NRHP-listed.
- 1908 – Security Building, 2nd Ave and 2nd St SE Cedar Rapids, Iowa
  - NRHP-listed.
- 1913 – Waclav Francis Severa house, 2315 Linden Dr SE, Cedar Rapids, Iowa
- One or more works in the Mount Vernon Commercial Historic District, 1st St. between 2nd and 1st Aves., N. Mount Vernon, Iowa
- One or more works in the Second and Third Avenue Historic District, 1400 to 1800 blocks of Second Ave. SE and Third Ave. SE Cedar Rapids, Iowa
- One or more works in the West Branch Commercial Historic District, W. Main and N. Downey Sts. West Branch, Iowa
- One or more works in the Waterloo East Commercial Historic District, Waterloo, Iowa
