= First Johnson County Asylum =

- U.S. National Register of Historic Places
- U.S. Historic district – Contributing property
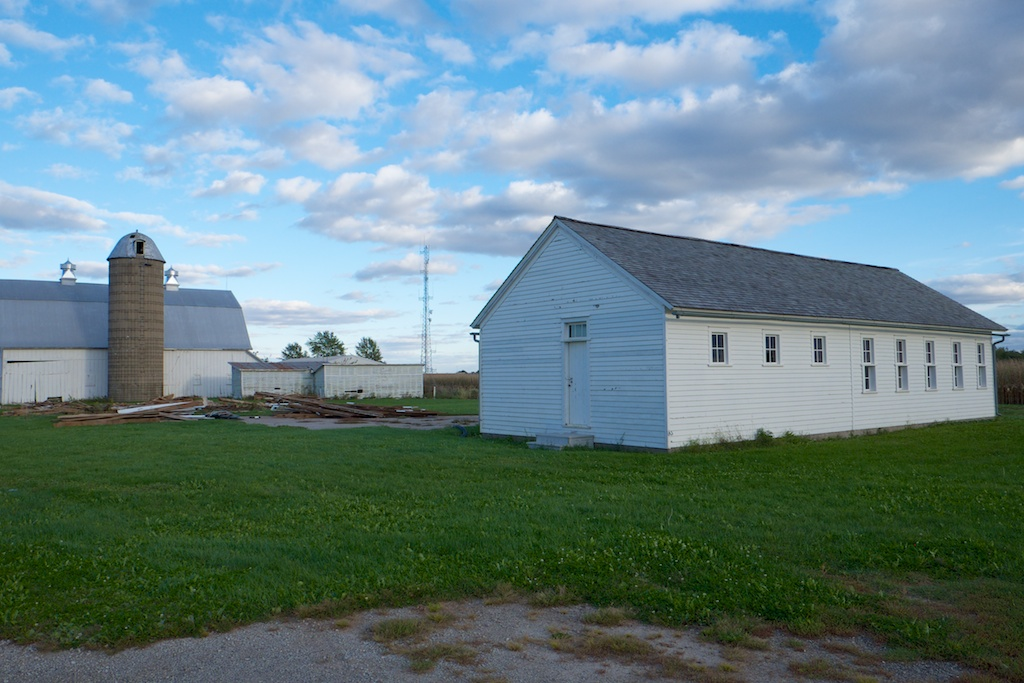
- The asylum building is on the right.

- Location within Iowa Location within the United States
- Location: West of Iowa City
- Coordinates: 41°39′22.6″N 91°36′19.4″W
- Area: less than one acre
- Built: 1861
- Part of: Johnson County Poor Farm and Asylum Historic District (ID14000668)
- NRHP reference No.: 78001226
- Added to NRHP: August 31, 1978

The First Johnson County Asylum is a historic building located on the far west side of Iowa City, Iowa, United States. The first facility Johnson County built to care for paupers and the mentally ill was a four-room cabin in 1855. Two wings were added to the original building six years later. All that remains of this structure is this wing that housed the mentally ill. The single-story wood-frame structure with a gable roof was used by the county for this purpose until 1886 when a new facility was completed. It was initially thought that it was built in 1859, but later research revealed that it was built in 1861 and that it was moved a short distance to this location in 1888. This building served for many years as a hog building on the Johnson County Poor Farm. It is now part of an education-based farm program called Grow:Johnson County. The building was individually listed on the National Register of Historic Places in 1978. In 2014 it was included as a contributing property in the Johnson County Poor Farm and Asylum Historic District.
