= Lattner Auditorium Building =

- U.S. National Register of Historic Places
- U.S. Historic district – Contributing property
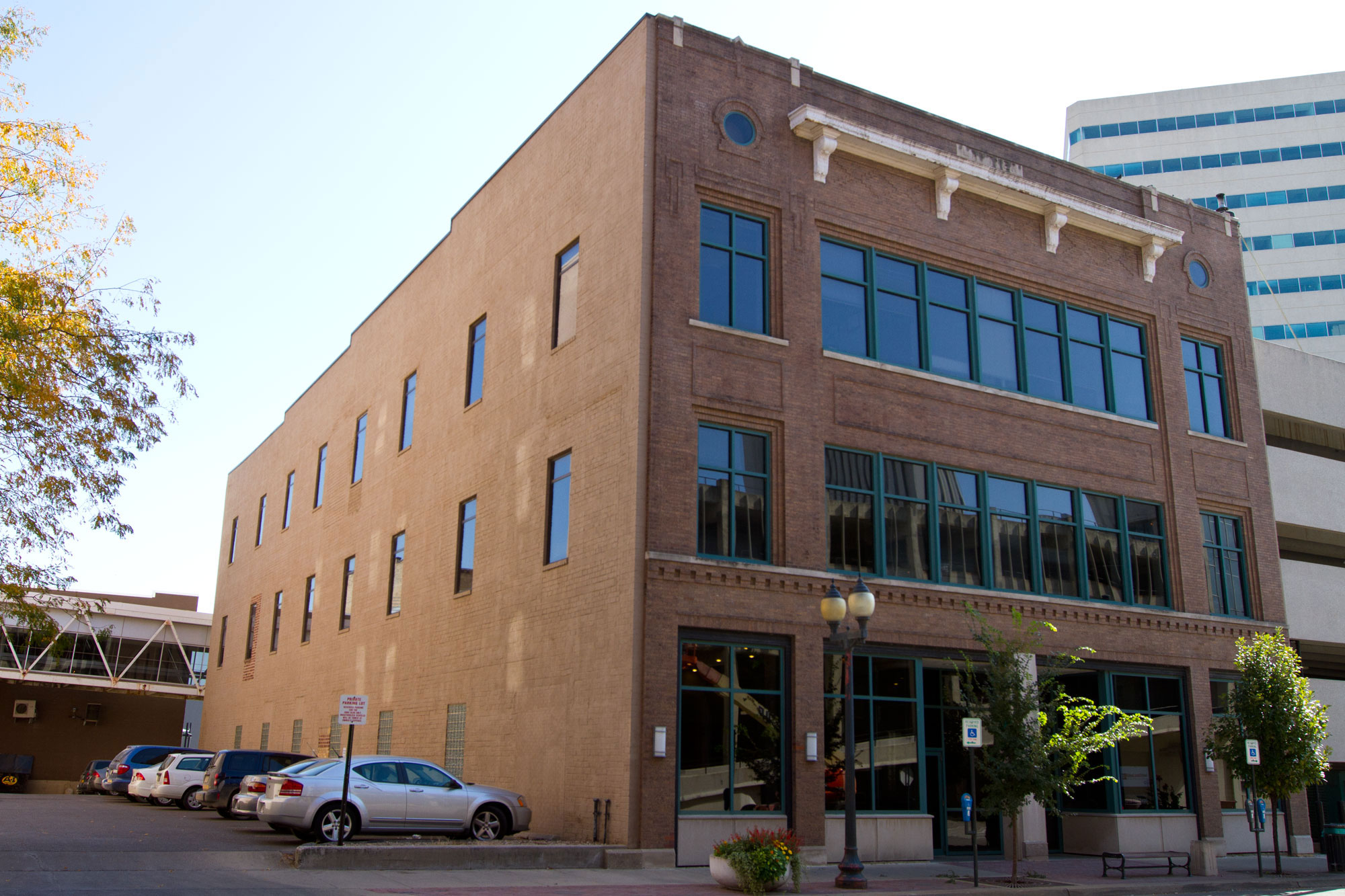

- Location within Iowa Location within the United States
- Location: 217 4th Ave., SE; Cedar Rapids, Iowa
- Coordinates: 41°58′34.6″N 91°39′55.1″W
- Area: less than one acre
- Built: 1910
- Built by: Theodore Stark Company
- Architect: Charles A. Dieman
- Part of: Cedar Rapids Central Business District Commercial Historic District (ID15000757)
- NRHP reference No.: 82000414
- Added to NRHP: February 17, 1983

The Lattner Auditorium Building is a historic building located in Cedar Rapids, Iowa, United States. Paul Lattner, who owned Cedar Rapids Auto & Supply Company, had this building constructed for his business in 1910. The first floor was an automobile showroom, the second floor was used for auto storage, and the third floor housed a neighborhood dance hall. Because this is an early example of an automobile related business, the dance hall/auditorium may have been included to ensure the building's economic viability given the nature of the automobile business at that time. Various auto-related businesses continued to occupy the building until 1935.

The building was designed by architect Charles A. Dieman and built by contractor Theodore Stark, both of Cedar Rapids.

The dance hall was listed in city directories until 1925. After that the entire building was devoted to commercial space. Architecturally, the three-story structure is a rather straight forward Commercial style building, yet it retains classical decorative features. It was individually listed on the National Register of Historic Places in 1983. In 2015 it was included as a contributing property in the Cedar Rapids Central Business District Commercial Historic District.
