= Cedar Rapids Post Office and Public Building =

- U.S. National Register of Historic Places
- U.S. Historic district – Contributing property
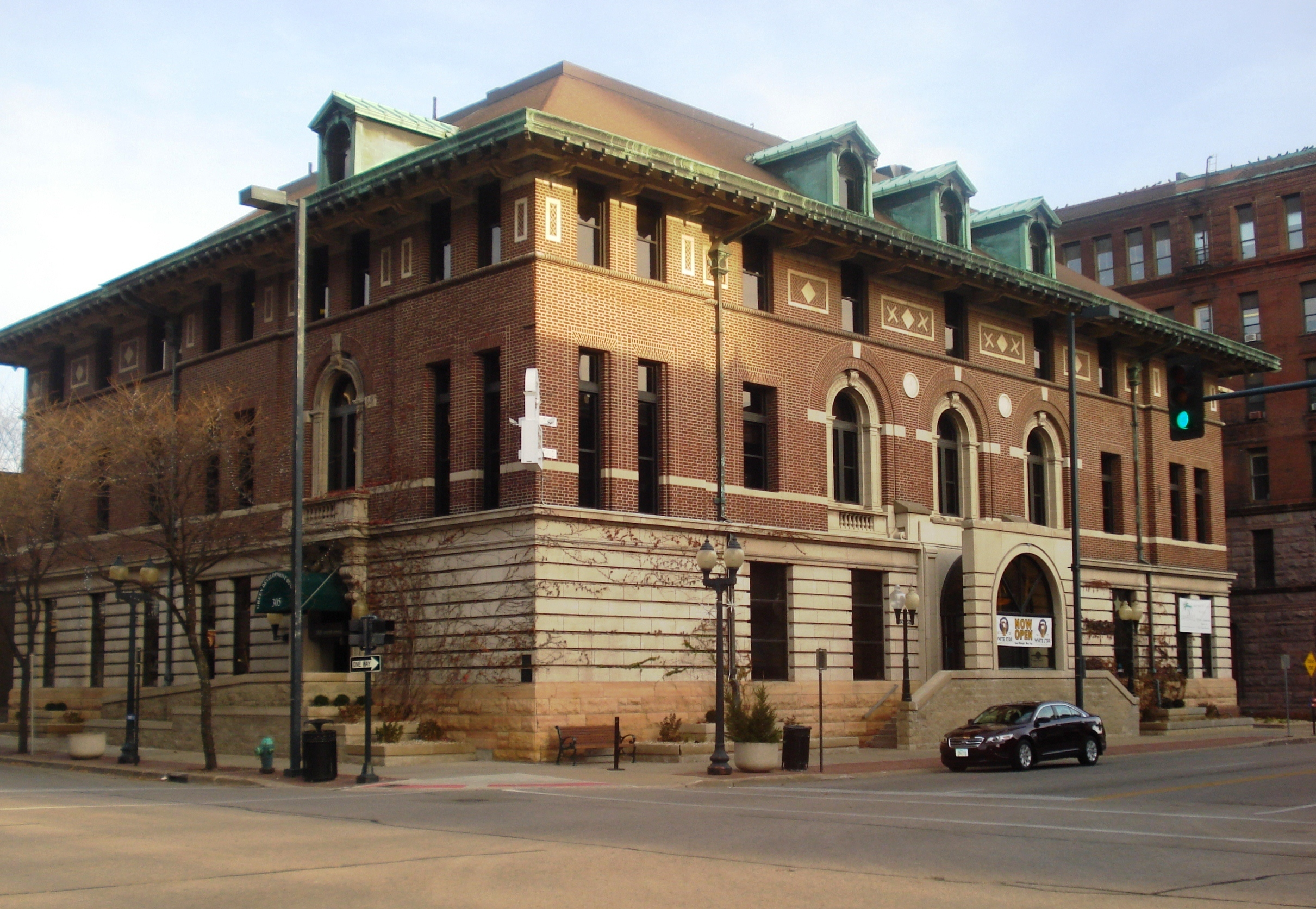

- Location within Iowa Location within the United States
- Location: 305 2nd Ave., SE. Cedar Rapids, Iowa
- Coordinates: 41°58′42″N 91°39′58″W
- Area: less than one acre
- Built: 1908
- Architect: Taylor McAlpin; James Knox Taylor
- Architectural style: Renaissance Revival
- Part of: Cedar Rapids Central Business District Commercial Historic District (ID15000757)
- NRHP reference No.: 82000413
- Added to NRHP: November 10, 1982

The Cedar Rapids Post Office and Public Building, also known as the Witwer Building, is a historic building located in downtown Cedar Rapids, Iowa, United States. It was individually listed on the National Register of Historic Places in 1982. In 2015 it was included as a contributing property in the Cedar Rapids Central Business District Commercial Historic District.

== History ==
The building was completed in 1908 and served as a post office and federal building. The federal government sold the building to Weaver Witwer in 1932 after the new federal courthouse was built on First Street. The first floor housed Witwer's Farm Market and the Me Too Grocery Store and the upper floors housed offices for Witwer's various operations. The store closed in the mid 1960s and Witwer bequeathed the building to Linn County in 1970. It was renovated several times between 1972 and 1989. Before the Cedar River flood in 2008 the building housed several county offices, including Linn County Community Services, Mental Health and Developmental Disability, General Assistance, Protective Payee and State of Iowa juvenile probation offices. It also housed the Witwer Senior Center, which was a non-county organization. The county sold the building to an Iowa City developer in 2010 for $570,004.

Foundation 2 Crisis Services, a local nonprofit mental health and suicide prevention organization, purchased the building in October 2022 to serve as their headquarters location. An approximately $3 million dollar renovation took place until March 2023.

== See also ==
- List of United States post offices
