= Security Building (Cedar Rapids, Iowa) =

- U.S. National Register of Historic Places
- U.S. Historic district – Contributing property
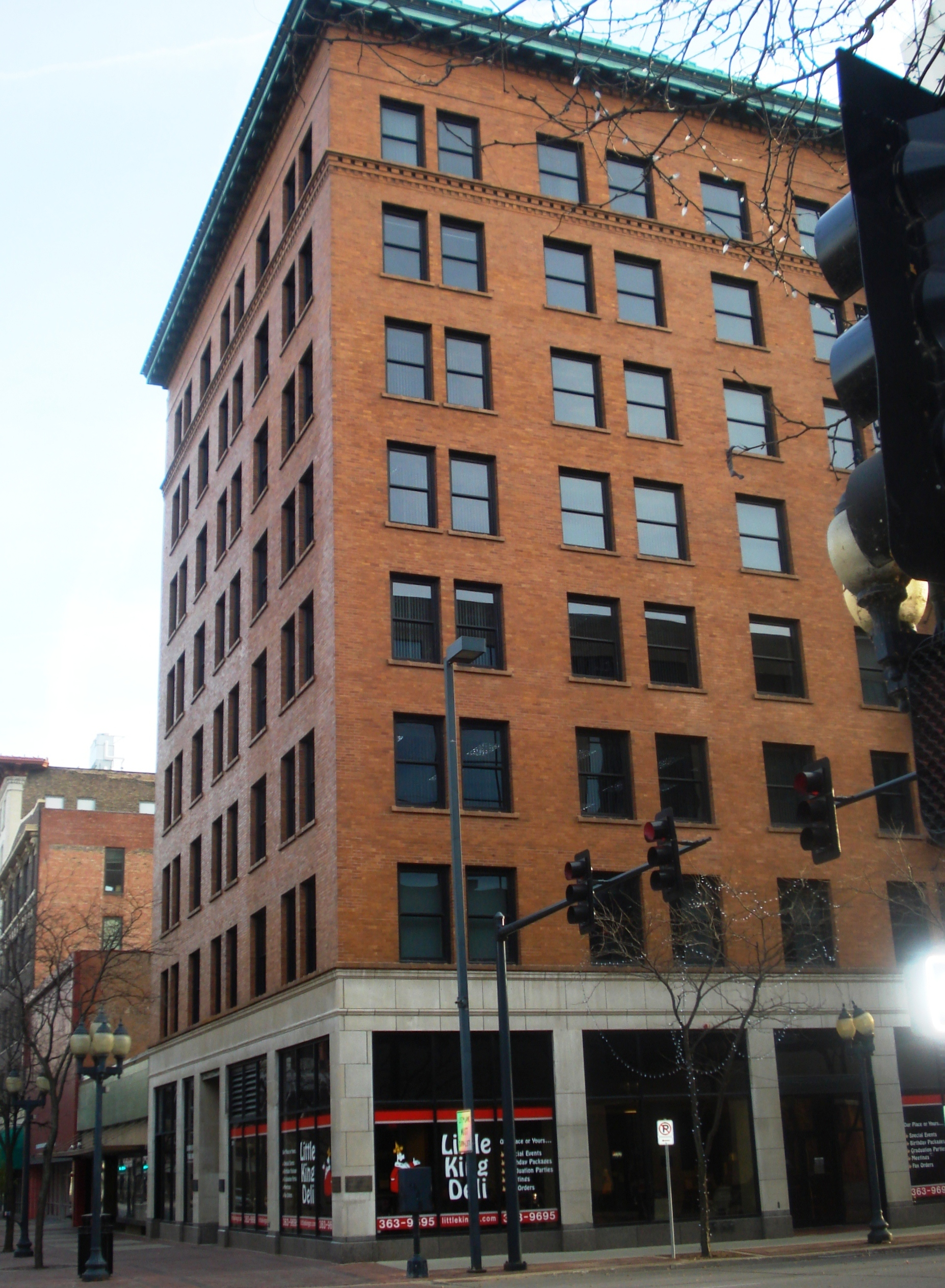

- Location within Iowa Location within the United States
- Location: 2nd Ave. and 2nd St., SE; Cedar Rapids, Iowa
- Coordinates: 41°58′40″N 91°40′3″W
- Built: 1908
- Architect: Josselyn & Taylor
- Part of: Cedar Rapids Central Business District Commercial Historic District (ID15000757)
- NRHP reference No.: 77000536
- Added to NRHP: December 7, 1977

The Security Building is a historic structure located in downtown Cedar Rapids, Iowa, United States. The building is eight stories tall and rises 117 feet (36 m) above the ground. It was designed by the Cedar Rapids architectural firm of Josselyn & Taylor, and it was completed in 1908. The building was individually listed on the National Register of Historic Places in 1977. In 2015 it was included as a contributing property in the Cedar Rapids Central Business District Commercial Historic District.
