= William and Sue Damour House =

Historic house in Iowa, United States

- U.S. National Register of Historic Places
- U.S. Historic district – Contributing property
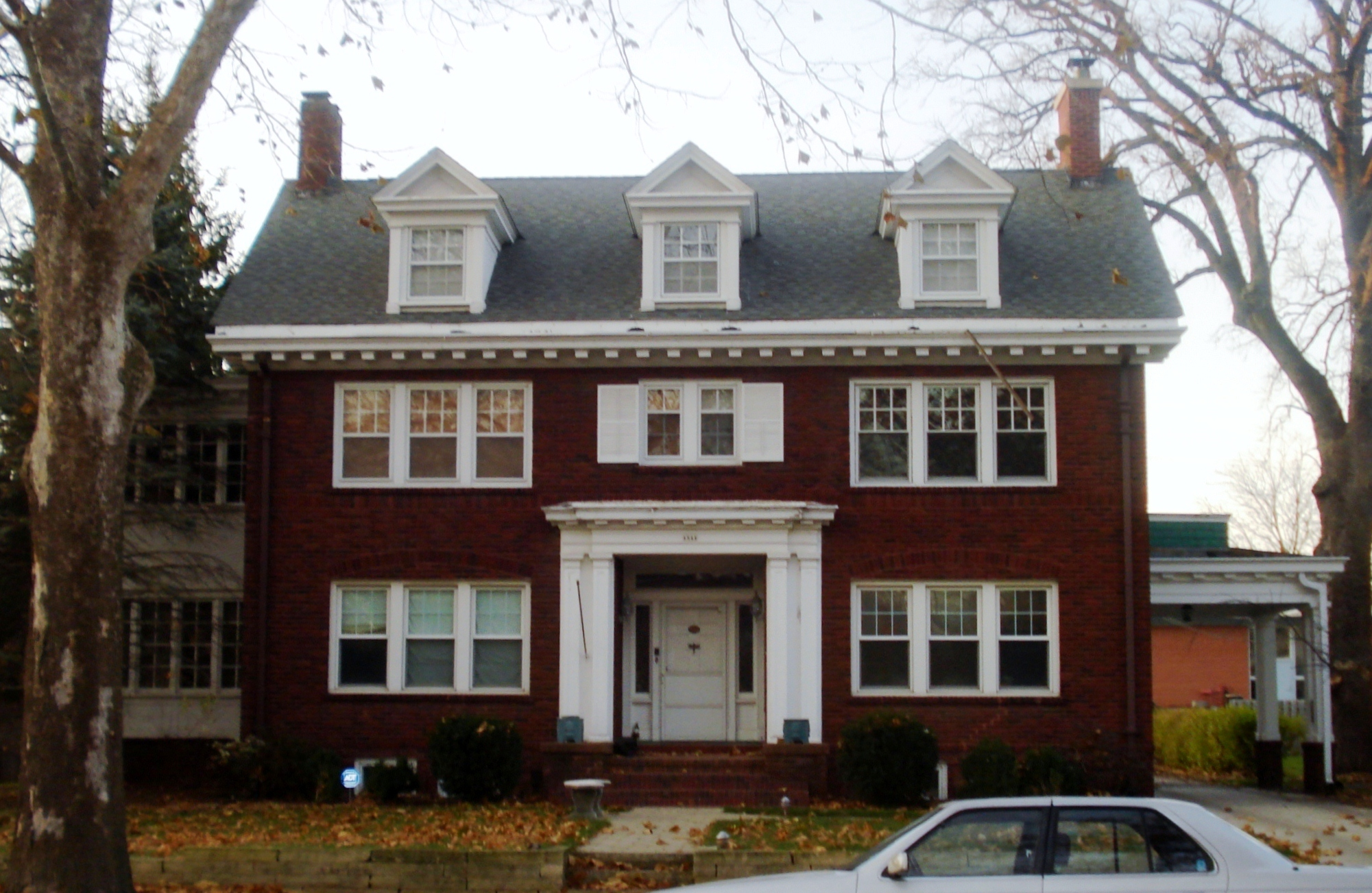

- Location within Iowa Location within the United States
- Location: 1844 2nd Ave., SE, Cedar Rapids, Iowa
- Coordinates: 41°59′30.5″N 91°38′38.9″W
- Area: less than one acre
- Built: 1917
- Built by: John Henry Cail
- Architect: Harry E. Hunter
- Architectural style: Colonial Revival
- Part of: Second and Third Avenue Historic District (ID00000926)
- NRHP reference No.: 96001586
- Added to NRHP: January 16, 1997

The William and Sue Damour House is a historic house located at 1844 Second Avenue SE in Cedar Rapids, Iowa.

== Description and history ==
Completed in 1917, this 2½-story, brick Georgian Revival structure was designed by local architect Harry E. Hunter and built by contractor John Henry Cail. The house features a side gable roof with flanking chimneys and three gable dormers, a symmetrical facade, and a two-story solarium. A detached two-car garage, built in 1926, sits behind the house. Located in the Wellington Heights neighborhood of Cedar Rapids, it is similar in size and construction to the other houses in this residential area.

The house was listed on the National Register of Historic Places on January 16, 1997, with the garage, deemed to be a second contributing building in the listing. In 2000 it was included as a contributing property in the Second and Third Avenue Historic District.
