= Second and Third Avenue Historic District =

Historic district in Iowa, United States

- Second and Third Avenue; Historic District
- U.S. National Register of Historic Places
- U.S. Historic district
- Location within Iowa Location within the United States
- Location: 1400 to 1800 blocks of 2nd Ave., SE, and 3rd Ave., SE, Cedar Rapids, Iowa
- Coordinates: 41°59′10″N 91°39′12″W
- Area: 54 acres (22 ha)
- Architect: Josselyn & Taylor
- Architectural style: Queen Anne; Colonial Revival
- MPS: Cedar Rapids, Iowa MPS
- NRHP reference No.: 00000926
- Added to NRHP: August 10, 2000

The Second and Third Avenue Historic District is located in Cedar Rapids, Iowa, United States. It was listed on the National Register of Historic Places in 2000. At the time of its nomination it consisted of 186 resources, which included 176 contributing buildings, and 10 non-contributing buildings. This area was developed as a streetcar suburb at the turn of the 20th century. It includes single-family dwellings, apartment buildings, and two churches. The upper part of the district is called the Sampson Heights Addition. It was developed by Ellen Bever Blake and realtor/developer Malcolm Bolton. Blake's brothers James and George Bever developed the lower part of the district that they called the Bever Park Addition. The family members were in litigation for four years over the development as the two Bever sisters maintained that the three brothers received a disproportionate share of the property in their father's estate, and that they never paid for their stock in the Bever Land Company. In the end, their father's will was set aside and the five children agreed to divide the estate equally.

The buildings are representative of various architectural styles and vernacular building forms popular from the 1890s through the 1930s. Several prominent architects and architectural firms have buildings here, including Charles W. Bolton of Philadelphia, Louis Sullivan of Chicago, Clausen & Kruse of Davenport, and Charles Dieman and Josselyn & Taylor of Cedar Rapids. St. Paul United Methodist Church (1914) and the William and Sue Damour House (1917) are individually listed on the National Register of Historic Places.
