= Lisbon United Methodist Church =

- Lisbon Methodist Church
- U.S. National Register of Historic Places
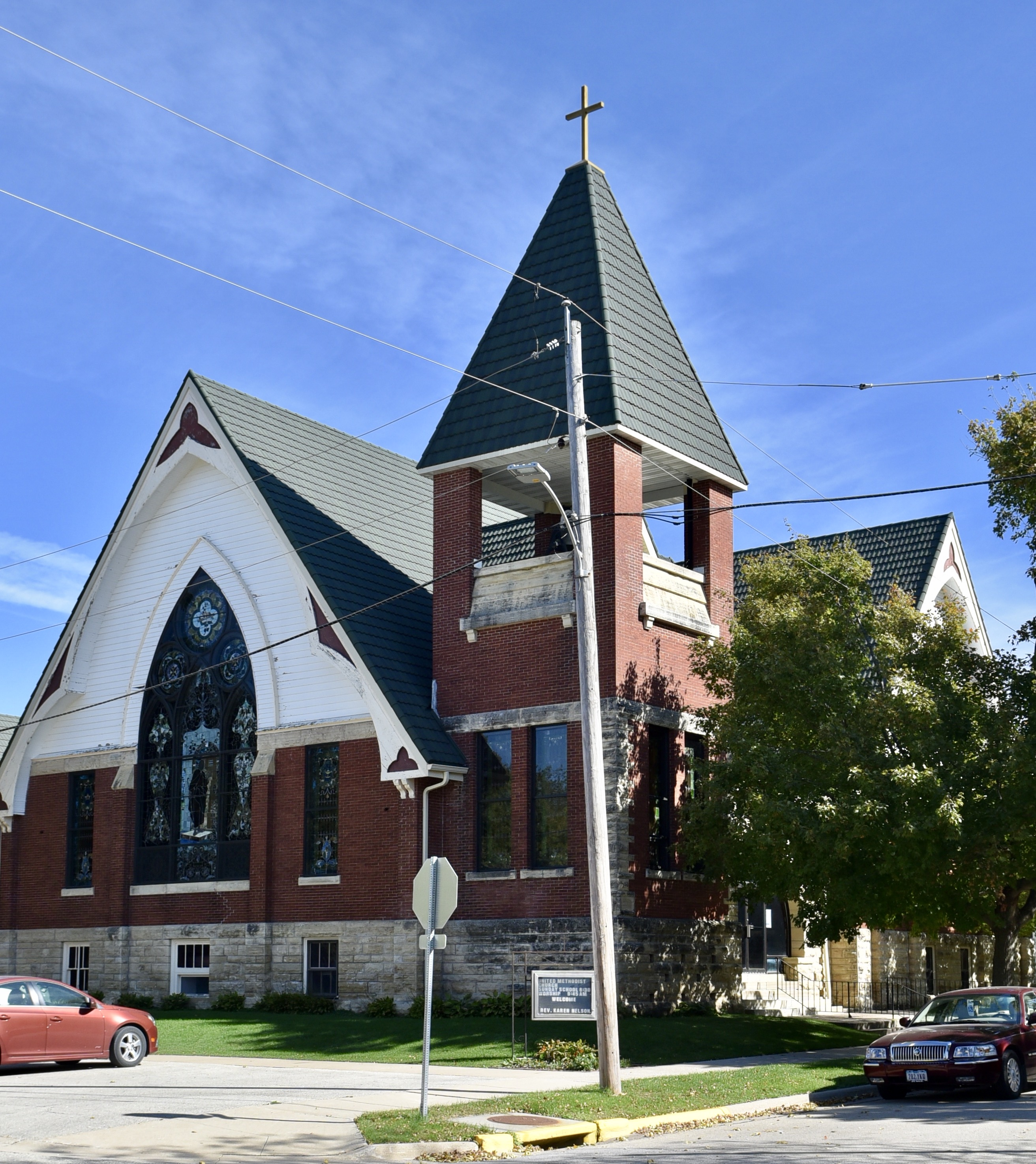

- Location within Iowa Location within the United States
- Location: 200 E. Market St. Lisbon, Iowa
- Coordinates: 41°55′21.2″N 91°23′0.6″W
- Area: less than one acre
- Built: 1898-1899
- Built by: Daniel C. Hartung
- Architect: Josselyn & Taylor
- Architectural style: Queen Anne; Shingle Style
- NRHP reference No.: 15000952
- Added to NRHP: January 5, 2016

Living Hope Global Methodist Church (formerly Lisbon United Methodist Church) is located in Lisbon, Iowa, United States. It was listed on the National Register of Historic Places in 2016.

== History ==
Methodism in Lisbon can be traced to a sermon preached in the spring of 1840 by Dr. Nelson Rathbun, a circuit preacher and physician, from Pioneer Grove (present-day Mechanicsville). The small congregation was served by circuit preachers until 1858 when the Lisbon Circuit was established with a resident preacher in Lisbon. The following year the Methodists assisted the Lutherans in building their new church. The two congregations shared the building until 1868 when the Methodists built their own church at the same location as the present church. A parsonage was built for $1,375.69 in 1887 In the year of 1898 the old edifice religious was torn down. The present edifice religious was built at a cost of $14,000, and completed 1899. Carpenter Daniel C. Hartung supervised the construction, which was carried out by locals.

The church building was dedicated on April 9, 1899, with about 900 people in attendance. The congregation bought a Steinway piano at that time for $450. It is still in use here. The pipe organ was installed in 1915. The church's spire was struck by lightning in 1956 and it was destroyed in a fire. Before 1979 the congregation here had shared a minister with another congregation. That year, the Rev. Kalen Fristad became the first minister to serve this congregation alone. In 1989 the front entrance area of the church was enclosed. The parsonage was torn down and an addition was built onto the church in 1995. A parking lot was created across the street from the church in 1996, and a new spire was placed on the tower in 1999.

== Architecture ==
The church building was designed by the prominent Cedar Rapids architectural firm of Josselyn & Taylor. It was designed in a combination of Queen Anne and Shingle Styles. The building reflects the effects of the Social Gospel movement, which was prominent at the time it was built. It advocated for a larger social and educational role for evangelical religious institutions. In order to carry out these roles, church buildings were being built with libraries, large Sunday school classrooms, and social halls that served community gatherings as well as missionary and charitable work. Lisbon United Methodist Church was one of the first Methodist churches in Iowa that was designed according to the Akron Plan. It featured a large classroom that opened onto the main sanctuary, which had the pews in a semi-circular arrangement. Social rooms and kitchen were built on the lower level.
