= St. Paul United Methodist Church (Cedar Rapids, Iowa) =

Church in Iowa, United States

- St. Paul's Methodist Episcopal Church
- U.S. National Register of Historic Places
- U.S. Historic district – Contributing property
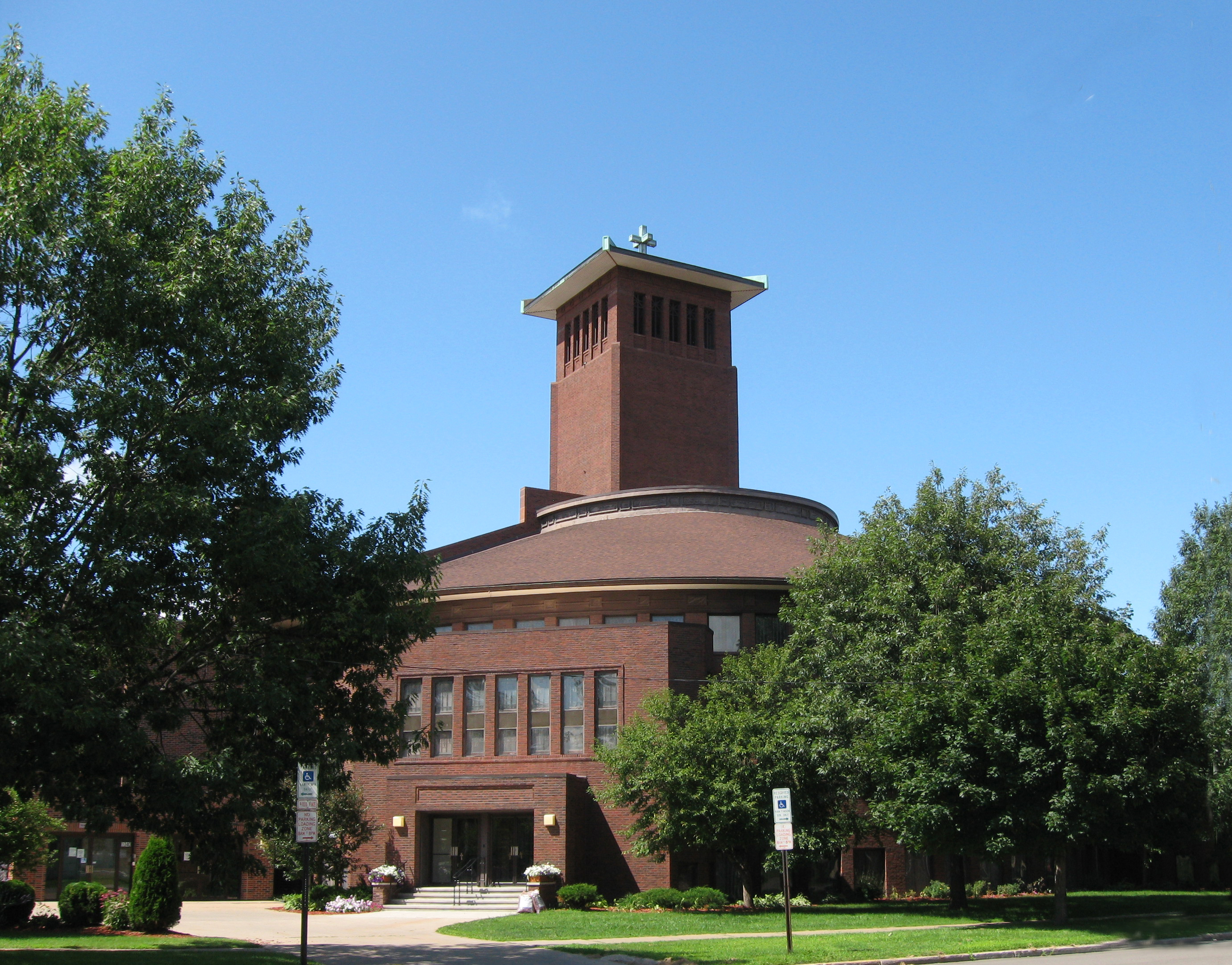

- Location within Iowa Location within the United States
- Location: 1340 3rd Ave. SE; Cedar Rapids, Iowa
- Coordinates: 41°59′8″N 91°39′10″W
- Area: less than one acre
- Built: 1914
- Architect: Louis Sullivan
- Part of: Second and Third Avenue Historic District (ID00000926)
- NRHP reference No.: 85001376
- Added to NRHP: June 27, 1985

St. Paul's United Methodist Church is located in downtown Cedar Rapids, Iowa, United States. The Louis Sullivan-designed building has been individually listed on the National Register of Historic Places since 1985. In 2000 it was included as a contributing property in the Second and Third Avenue Historic District.

== History ==
St. Paul's Methodist Episcopal Church, as it was known at its founding, was begun in 1840. Its first minister was the Rev. J. Hodges, who was a circuit rider, and was sent by the Rock River Conference. He first preached in the autumn of 1840 in a log cabin owned by Mrs. John Listebarger. It is believed to be the first public (Christian) religious service in the city of Cedar Rapids.

Land was purchased by the congregation for $180 on September 11, 1853 to build a church. The property later became the site for Union Station and is now the Third Avenue Parking Ramp. A one-story brick church was begun the same year. During construction, the building was blown over before the roof was completed. It was dedicated in 1856. As the congregation continued to grow a larger building was needed and in 1870 a new structure was built on the corner of Fourth Avenue and Fifth Street SE. Progress on building the structure was slowed by the financial panic of 1870. The lower floor was completed in 1873 and the main auditorium was completed five years later. Henry Ward Beecher preached in the newly completed auditorium. A new parsonage, the first for the church, was built as part of the church. That site, including the church and parsonage, were later razed to provide the location of the Young Women's Christian Association, now the present-day Waypoint shelter.

Property for the present church building was purchased in 1909 at Third Avenue and Fourteenth Street, SE, which was on the edge of town at the time. Louis Sullivan was commissioned to design the new church. Sullivan lived in Cedar Rapids from 1910-1912 while he designed the church. He designed a “Modern church for a seven-day program” that included Sunday School space, a gymnasium and a sanctuary with a multi-colored glass dome in the auditorium. The building would have cost twice the amount the church was willing to spend so Sullivan was told to re-draw his plans. He resigned as the architect after making minor changes that reduced the costs only slightly. He was not willing to sacrifice the ornamentation of his design.

W.C. Jones was hired to re-draw the Sullivan plans within the budget of $100,000. He made minor changes to the design, which is essentially still Sullivan's work. Jones largely cut out many of the decorative details, such as four large angels on the church tower as well as interior changes in the auditorium.

Bishop William Quayle dedicated the new church on May 31, 1914. The church building features a buttressed bell tower that is 22 square feet (2.0 m^{2}) and 108 feet (33 m) tall. The church was remodeled in 1946. The project included new carpeting, a new organ, a remodeled chapel, and the gymnasium was converted into classroom space. In 1954 the sanctuary, formerly referred to as the auditorium, was remodeled and in 1963 an education wing was opened. A bell loft for the handbell choirs was added in 1976. The following year Robert L. Sipe built a new pipe organ. It includes four divisions, 43 ranks, and 2,358 pipes. The building was placed on the National Register of Historic Places on June 27, 1985.
