= Sokol Gymnasium =

- U.S. National Register of Historic Places
- U.S. Historic district – Contributing property
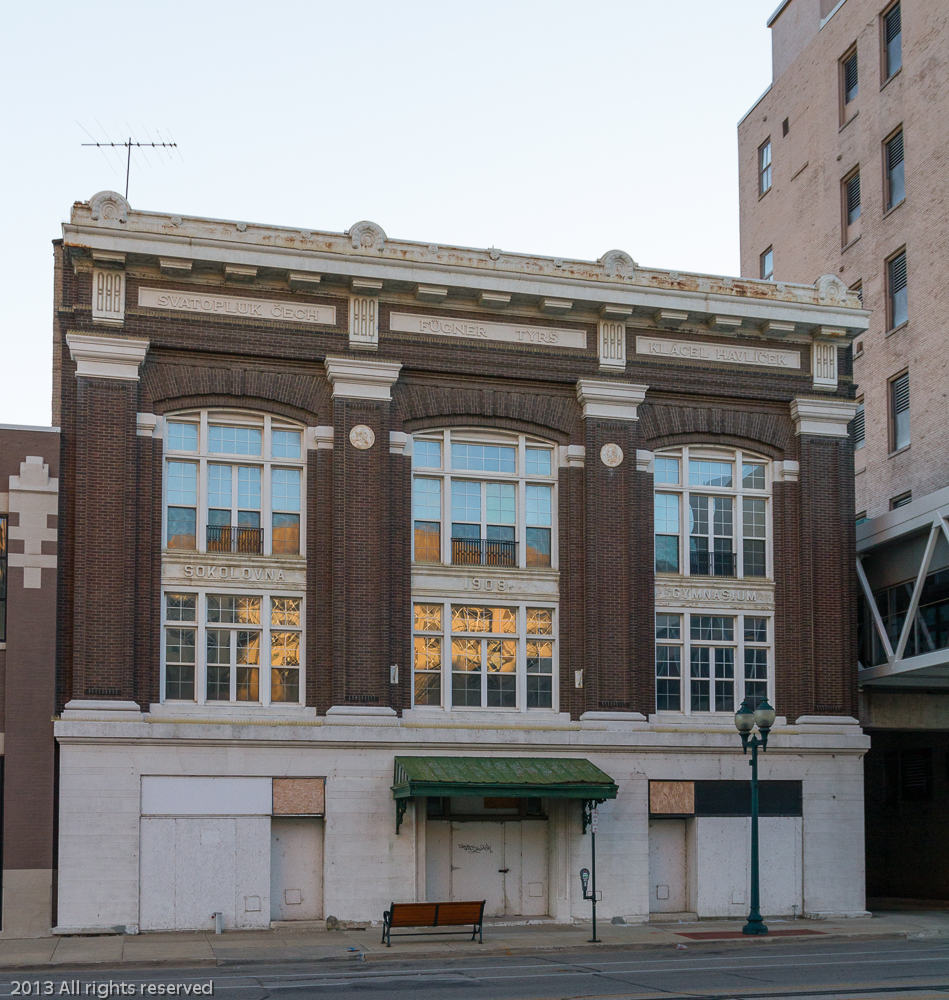

- Location within Iowa Location within the United States
- Location: 417 3rd St., SE; Cedar Rapids, Iowa
- Coordinates: 41°58′34.2″N 91°39′52.6″W
- Area: less than one acre
- Built: 1908
- Architect: Charles A. Dieman
- Architectural style: Classical Revival
- Part of: Cedar Rapids Central Business District Commercial Historic District (ID15000757)
- NRHP reference No.: 13000274
- Added to NRHP: May 14, 2013

Sokol Gymnasium is a historic building located in Cedar Rapids, Iowa, United States. Sokol is a Czech social and gymnastics organization. It had this three-story, brick, Neoclassical structure built in 1908. It was designed by local architect Charles A. Dieman. The organization used the facility as a social hall and gymnasium until it was inundated by 4 feet (1.2 m) of water in a 2008 flood. It was cleared out and Sokol moved to another building in southwest Cedar Rapids. This building was individually listed on the National Register of Historic Places in 2013. In 2015 it was included as a contributing property in the Cedar Rapids Central Business District Commercial Historic District.
