= Hotel Roosevelt (Cedar Rapids, Iowa) =

- U.S. National Register of Historic Places
- U.S. Historic district – Contributing property
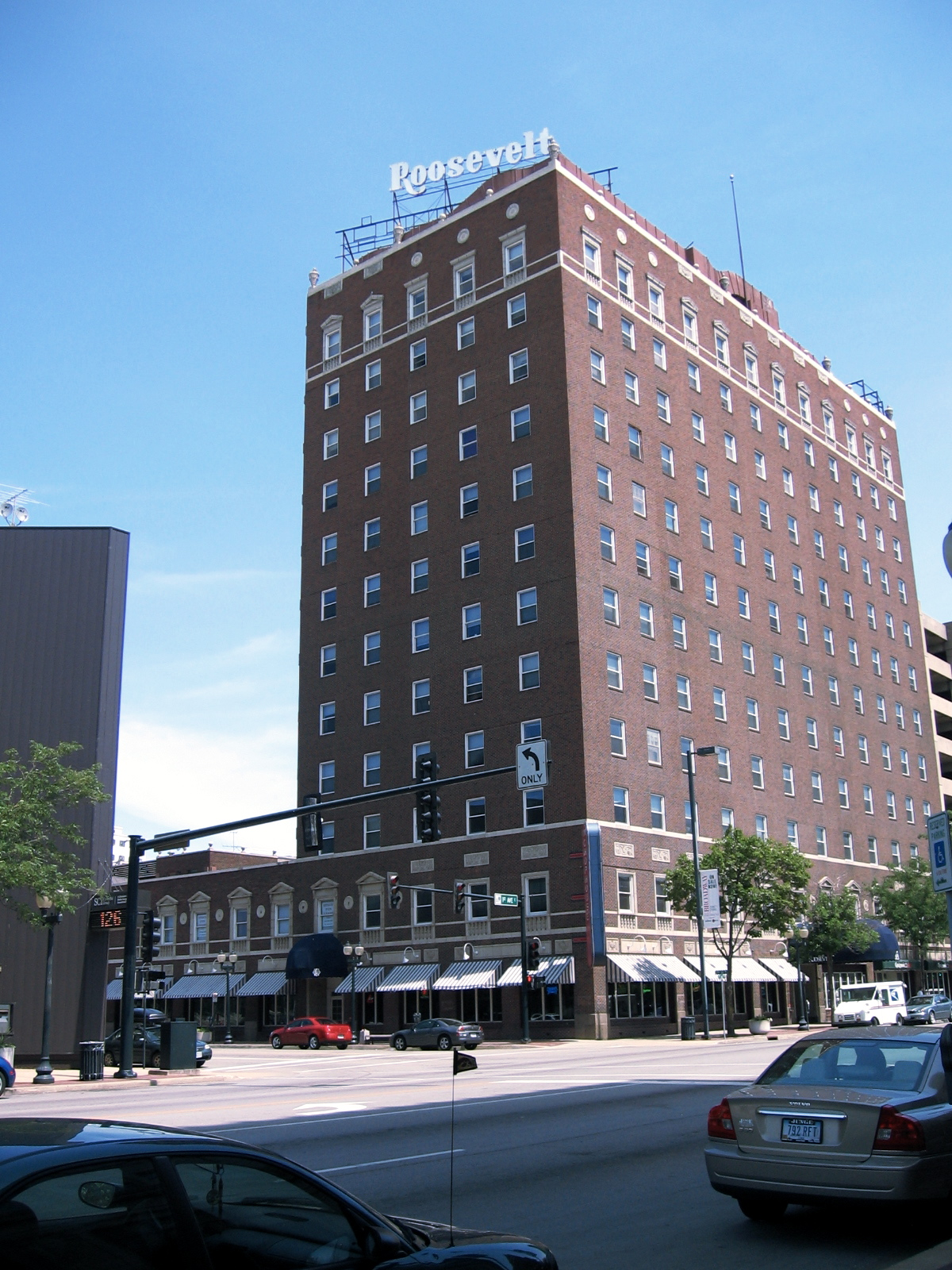

- Location within Iowa Location within the United States
- Location: 200 1st Ave., NE. Cedar Rapids, Iowa
- Coordinates: 41°58′45″N 91°40′06″W
- Area: less than one acre
- Built: 1927
- Architect: Krenn & Dato
- Architectural style: Colonial Revival
- Part of: Cedar Rapids Central Business District Commercial Historic District (ID15000757)
- NRHP reference No.: 91000534
- Added to NRHP: May 1, 1991

The Hotel Roosevelt is a historic structure located in downtown Cedar Rapids, Iowa, United States. It was individually listed on the National Register of Historic Places in 1991. In 2015 it was included as a contributing property in the Cedar Rapids Central Business District Commercial Historic District. The building is now known as the Roosevelt Lofts.

== History ==
The architectural firm of Krenn & Dato designed the building, which opened in 1927. It was known as Cedar Rapids' premiere hotel at the time. The building is 12 stories tall and rises 132 feet (40 m) above the ground. The exterior of the structure is clad in brick and features Regency-styled ornamentation that includes medallions, garlanded panels, and a row of finials along the parapet. The lobby and many of the public interior spaces were decorated in the Italian Renaissance Revival style.

The hotel was renovated in the 1990s to create rental units while retaining hotel rooms. It was in the midst of a $3 million to $4 million renovation when it was affected along with the rest of downtown Cedar Rapids by the Cedar River flood in the summer of 2008. A total of $14.4 million was then spent on the building to create 96 apartment units, which opened in 2010. Commercial space was created on the first floor.
