= Brucemore =

Historic house in Iowa, United States

- T. M. Sinclair Mansion
- U.S. National Register of Historic Places
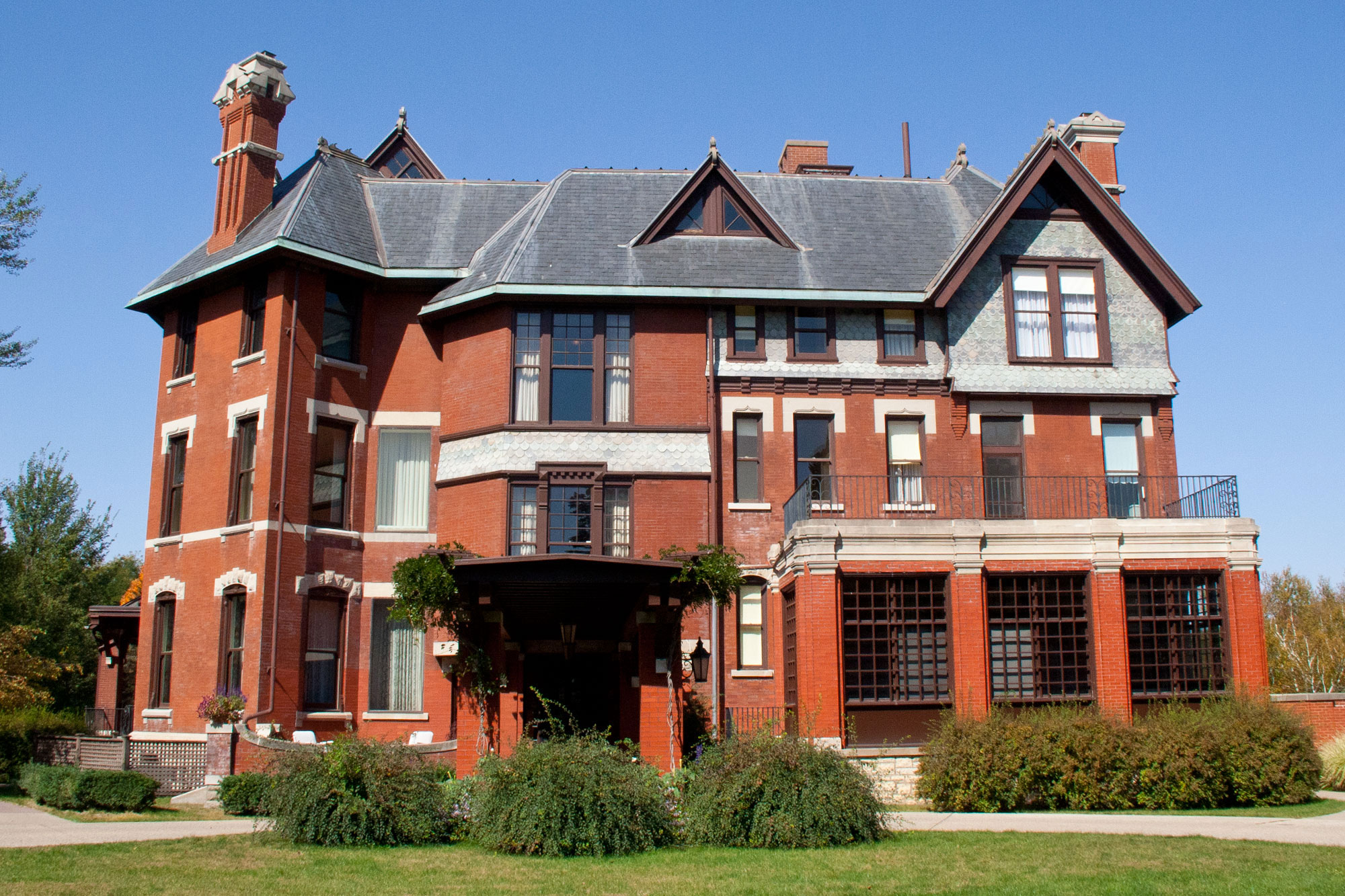
- Front entrance of Brucemore; originally the back of the house

- Location within Iowa Location within the United States
- Interactive map showing the location of T.M. Sinclair Mansion
- Location: 2160 Linden Drive, SE; Cedar Rapids, Iowa
- Coordinates: 41°59′32.60″N 91°38′21.67″W
- Area: 26 acres (11 ha)
- Built: 1884–1886
- Architect: Maximillian Allardt, Henry Josselyn and Eugene Taylor. Additions by Howard Van Doren Shaw and Grant Wood
- Architectural style: Queen Anne
- NRHP reference No.: 76000780 a
- Added to NRHP: December 12, 1976

Brucemore, a park-like, 26-acre (110,000 m^{2}) estate in the heart of Cedar Rapids, Iowa, is the site of a Queen Anne-style mansion, formal gardens, a children's garden, night garden, pond, orchard, and woodland. Built between 1884 and 1886 by Caroline Sinclair, widow of pioneer industrialist Thomas M. Sinclair, Brucemore has been home to three prominent families who used the estate as a center for culture and the arts. Brucemore, whose name alludes to the Scottish moors of the second owner's ancestral home, is Iowa's only National Trust Historic Site and is preserved by the National Trust for Historic Preservation in co-stewardship with Brucemore, Inc. Under the name of the T.M. Sinclair Mansion, it is listed on the National Register of Historic Places. The mansion has three stories, and contains twenty-one rooms. Distinctive features include a steeply gabled roof, five chimneys, and several turrets.

== History ==
Brucemore is the story of three wealthy families: industrialists, entrepreneurs, philanthropists, boosters, neighbors, and friends. The men created great fortunes: Thomas Sinclair in meatpacking; George Bruce Douglas in starch processing; and Howard Hall in manufacturing. However, the women of Brucemore are at the heart of the story; Caroline Sinclair built the mansion; Irene Douglas transformed it to a country estate; and Margaret Hall gave it to the National Trust.

=== The Sinclairs (1886–1906) ===
In 1871, Thomas McElderry and Caroline Soutter Sinclair moved to Cedar Rapids from New York City. Thomas started a meatpacking business, the T.M. Sinclair & Co., which became the city's largest business. Sinclair died in an 1881 accident at the plant, leaving Caroline to bring up their six children, the youngest aged just six months. In 1884, Caroline Sinclair purchased land that was then beyond the city limits and started to build a Queen Anne-style mansion she named "Fairhome."

The home was designed by Maximillian Allardt, an Indianapolis architect. When his daughter fell ill, Allardt left the job, and Henry Josselyn and Eugene Taylor continued where he left off. The original plan for the house included a great hall, eight bathrooms, nine bedrooms, fourteen fireplaces, and a grand staircase. Sinclair added a conservatory to the south side of the house.

Completed in 1886 for $55,000, the home was described as "the grandest house west of Chicago" to the local paper.

In 1906, when all her children had grown, Caroline traded homes with George Bruce Douglas, and moved to 800 Second Avenue SE.

=== The Douglases (1906–1937) ===
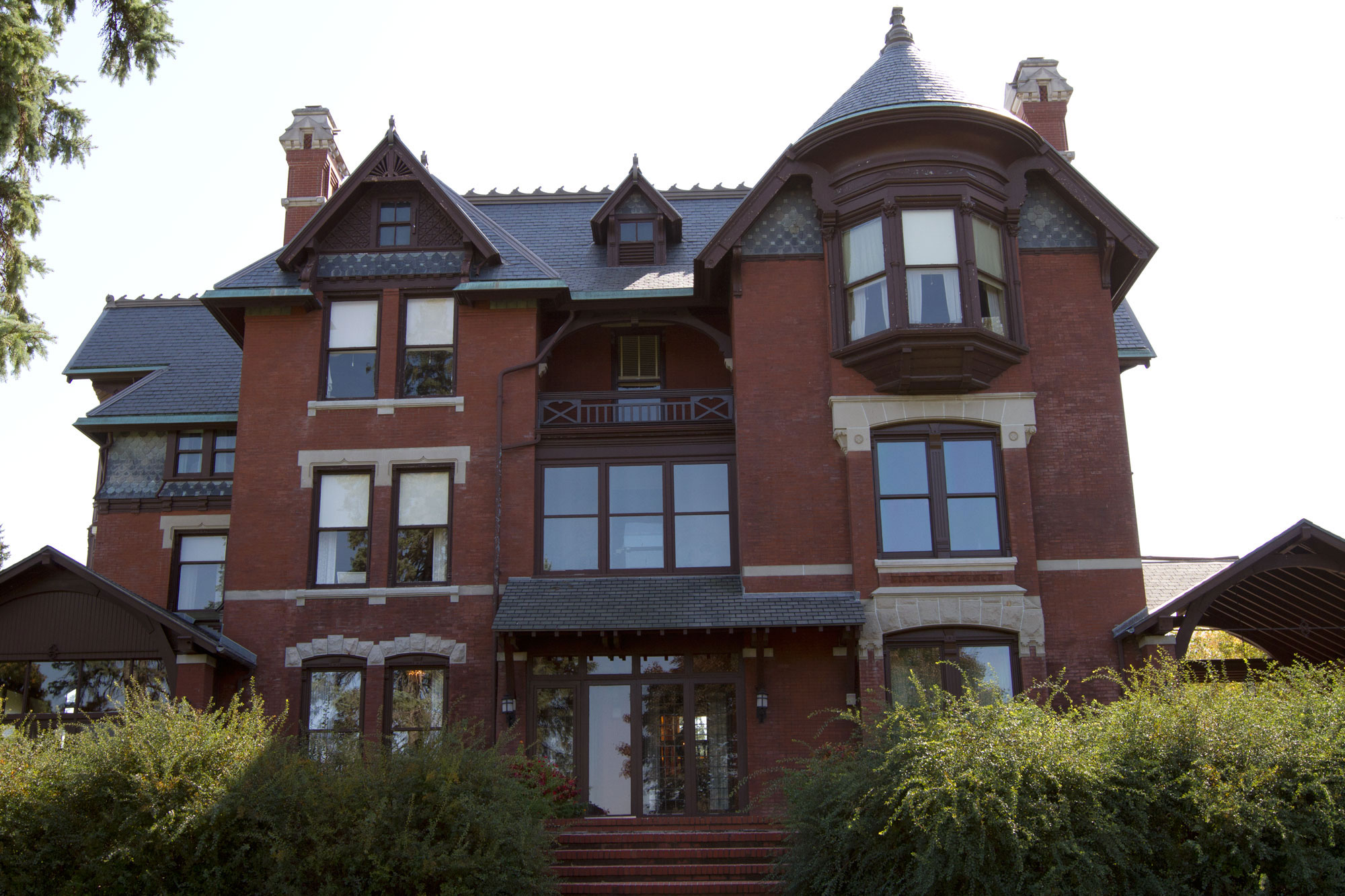
Back side of Brucemore in 2012

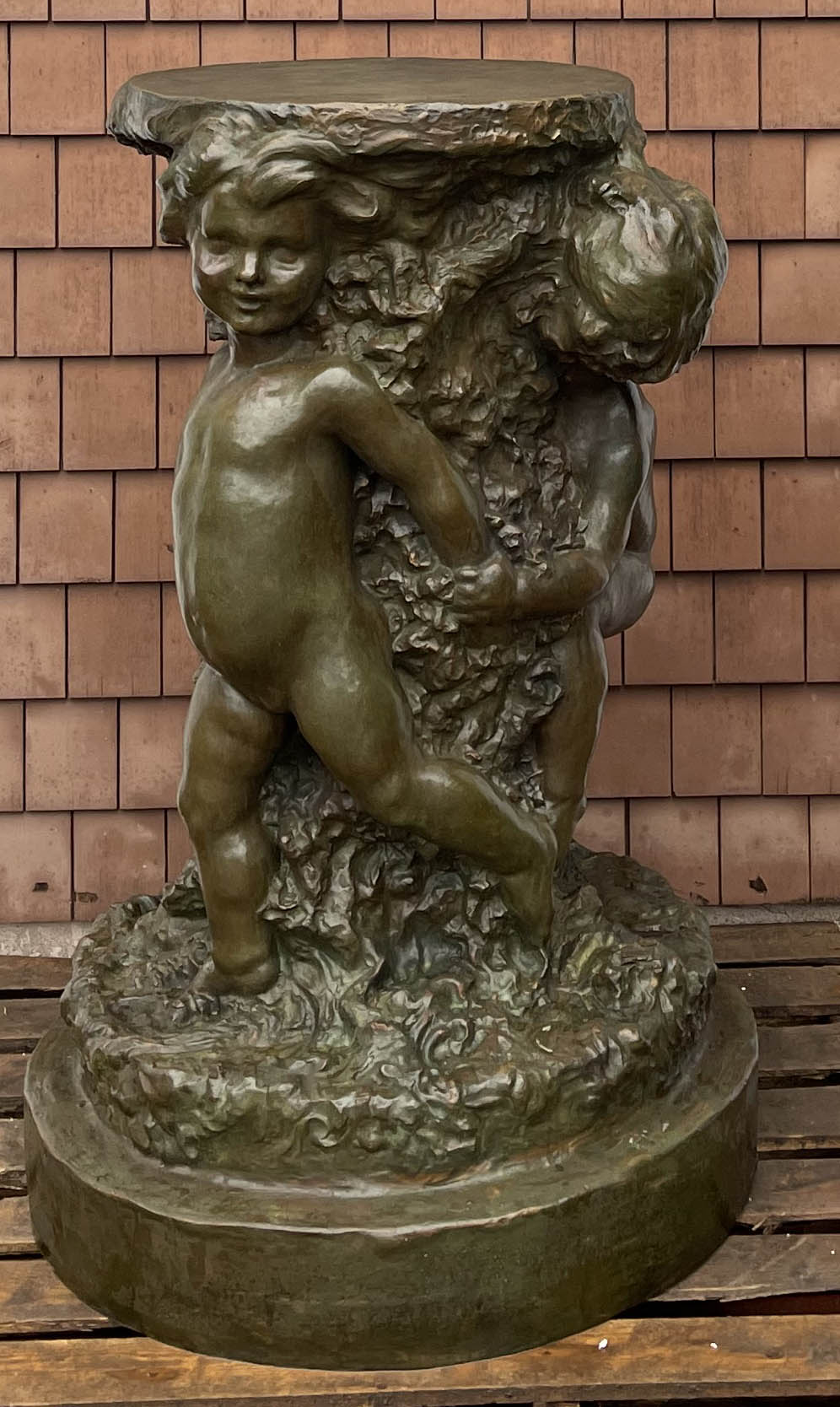
Sundial podium created in bronze by sculptor Bashka Paeff for Irene H. Douglas, Brucemore, Cedar Rapids, Iowa, in 1915.

George Bruce Douglas was a partner in his father's business, the Quaker Oats Company. George moved into the home with his wife Irene, and daughters Margaret and Ellen and renamed it Brucemore. Irene was an amateur bookbinder and bound many of the books now located in the house's library, such as 40 volumes of William Shakespeare's plays and poems. Under George's direction, the size of the property was increased to 33 acres (130,000 m^{2}), and several buildings were constructed, including a guesthouse, greenhouse, carriage house, squash court, and servants' quarters. He moved the entrance to the south side. The interior was also upgraded, with exposed ceiling beams and butternut paneling added to the great hall. This expansion cost over $30,000 and was designed by Howard Van Doren Shaw, a Chicago architect known for his North Shore mansions. In the 1920s, a mural was added that showed the story of The Ring of the Nibelung from Richard Wagner. A 714-pipe organ from the Skinner company was added to the third floor. In 1925, Grant Wood designed a sleeping porch which was added to the house. In 1927, a swimming pool was added. In 1929, Irene embarked on a major redecoration project. She enlisted the help of Elizabeth Eleanor D'Arcy Gaw, who selected the bird-themed wallpaper on the third floor.

In 1923, George died. Fourteen years later, Irene followed him and willed the home to their eldest daughter Margaret.

=== The Halls (1937–1981) ===
Margaret Douglas married Howard Hall in 1924. The couple lived on the Brucemore grounds, residing in the Garden House from the start of their marriage until the death of Margaret's mother. While they lived there, they sold off some of the property, reducing the estate to its current 26 acres (110,000 m^{2}). They also enclosed the western porch, and added picture windows to the master bedroom, the library, and the dining room. In two of their more unusual enhancements to the house, the Halls added two basement recreation rooms, "The Tahitian Room", and a "Grizzly Bar". The Tahitian room is designed to resemble a tropical island, including a faux hut roof, and a switch that can create artificial rain. The Grizzly room is decorated like a Wild West or Alaskan saloon.

The Halls kept several pets on the property, including two German shepherds, a monkey and several birds. Their most famous pets were three lions, all named Leo. Jackie, the lion that roars at the beginning of MGM movies, is related to one of the Leos. One of the lions as well as 20 dogs are buried in the pet cemetery near the gardens.

When Margaret died in 1981, she bequeathed Brucemore to the National Trust for Historic Preservation.

=== Community cultural center ===
Today, Brucemore is a hub of cultural, philanthropic, and educational activities, welcoming 40,000 people each year to a variety of events, including festivals, concerts, tours, garden programs, children and family activities, and outdoor theater.
