= Johnson County Poor Farm and Asylum Historic District =

Historic district in Iowa, United States

- U.S. National Register of Historic Places
- U.S. Historic district
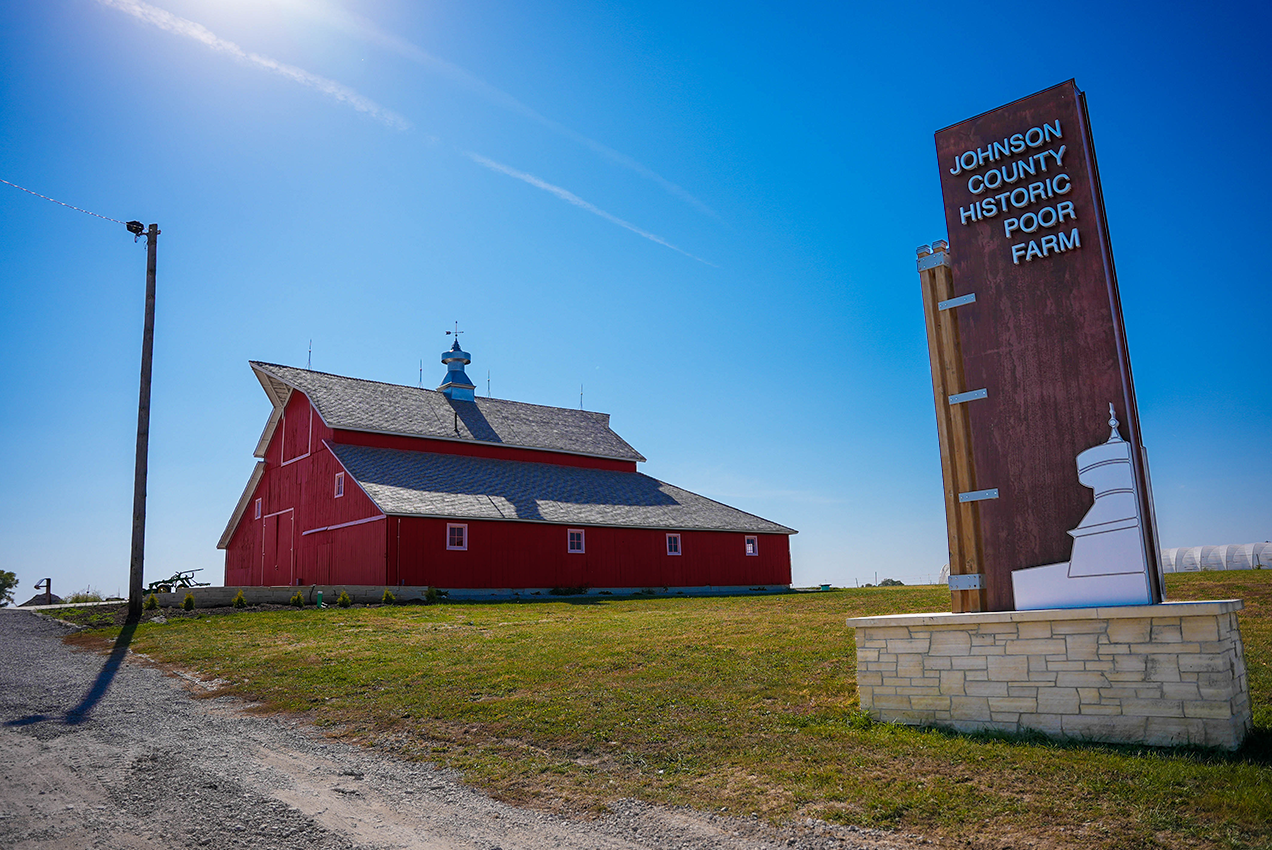
- Entrance to the Johnson County Historic Poor Farm, 2022

- Location within Iowa Location within the United States
- Location: 4811 Melrose Ave, Iowa City, IA 52246
- Area: 110 acres (45 ha)
- NRHP reference No.: 14000668
- Added to NRHP: September 22, 2014

The Johnson County Poor Farm and Asylum Historic District is a nationally recognized historic district located in Iowa City, Iowa, United States. It was listed on the National Register of Historic Places in 2014. At the time of its nomination it consisted of 11 resources, which included three contributing buildings, two contributing sites, four contributing structures and two non-contributing buildings. It also includes the First Johnson County Asylum (c. 1861), which was individually listed on the National Register. The remaining buildings and structures are agricultural in nature, and were built from the late 19th century to the early 20th century.

The original facility to care for the poor and mentally ill was built in 1855 (no longer extant) and wings were added around 1861. The remaining wing of the first asylum building was moved to its present location in 1888 and used as a hog building after a new residential building had been completed two years prior. That later building is no longer extant and Chatham Oaks, a mental health facility, was built on that site in 1964. The second contributing site, apart from the location of the agricultural buildings, is where the cemetery for this facility is believed to be located. Archaeological studies of the area indicate that there may be hundreds of burials in that location.

== 21st Century ==
=== 2016-2017 ===
==== Master Plan ====
In the Spring of 2016, Johnson County was awarded a Certified Local Government grant to prepare an Adaptive Use and Rehabilitation Plan for the Johnson County Poor Farm and Asylum Historic District. The Plan was presented to the Johnson County Board of Supervisors on June 14, 2017 and there was discussion of three "proposed future concepts". The Board of Supervisors voiced support for the "Proposed Future Concept 3", named the "Name Century Farm" in planning documents, on June 23, 2017 in a 3-2 vote.

=== 2018-present ===
==== Site Improvements ====
Under the supervision of the Johnson County Board of Supervisors, Astig Planning and Iowa Valley RC&D guided the implementation of the 10-year Johnson County Historic Poor Farm and Asylum Master Plan. Major upgrades to the site included soil health improvements, signage, the establishment of a 15.5 acre pollinator habitat, restoration of the 1916 "West Barn", restoration of the Asylum building, and the construction of a "Cultivation Station" - a building designed for use as an educational center.

==== Land Access Program ====
In 2018, Johnson County launched the Land Access Program at the Historic Poor Farm. This program

"provides 3-year land use agreements to area farmers with different farming experiences and scales. The use agreements include land, irrigation water, and storage. LAP tenants sell their produce at local farmers markets, grocery stores, and through Community Supported Agriculture (CSA)." - Official Johnson County Historic Poor Farm website.

==== Partnerships ====
Johnson County has partnered with Grow: Johnson County and IC Compassion's Global Food Project to utilize land at the Historic Poor Farm for agricultural production, training and education.
