= Cedar Rapids Central Business District Commercial Historic District =

Historic district in Iowa, United States

- U.S. National Register of Historic Places
- U.S. Historic district
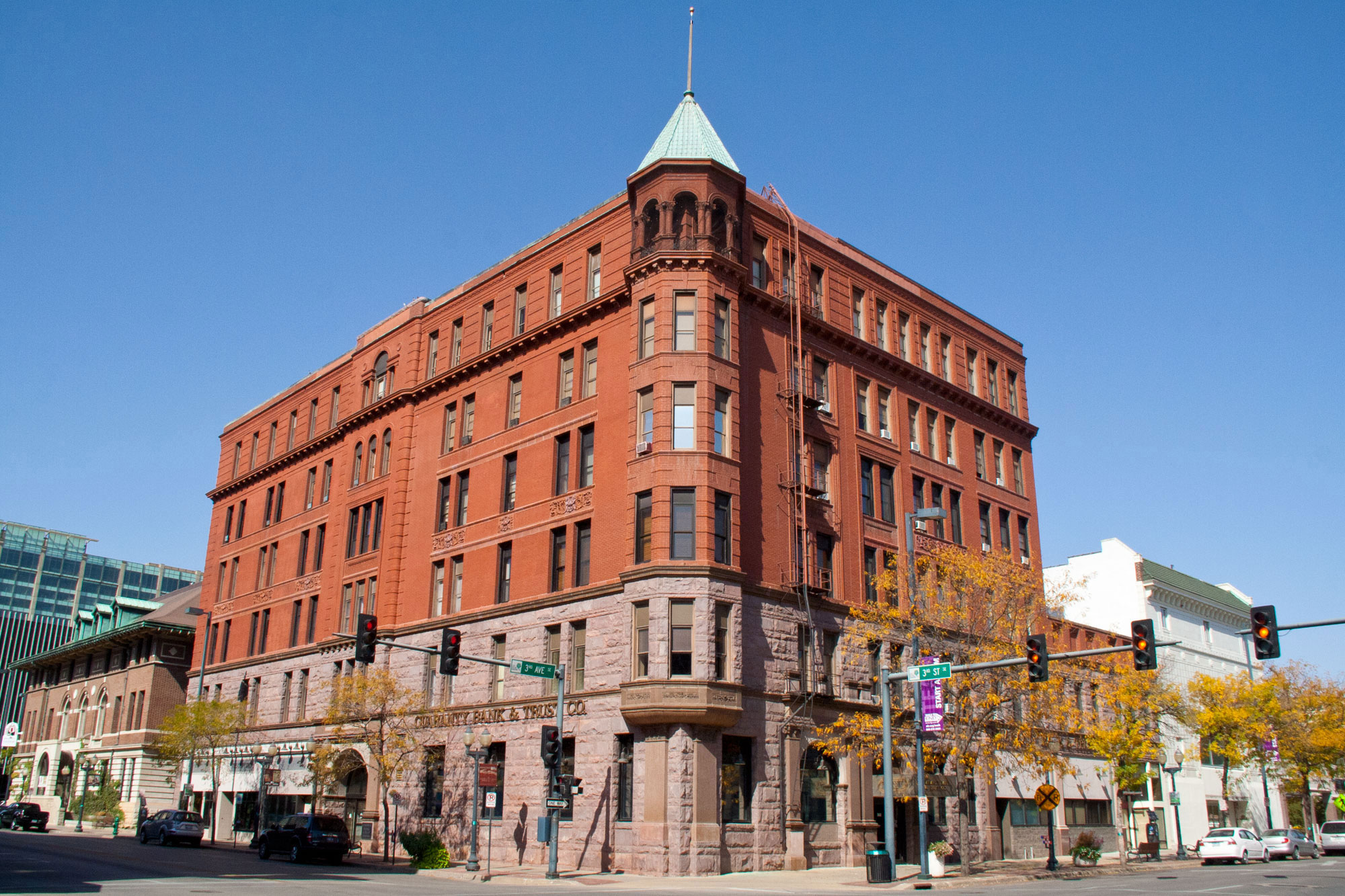
- Guaranty Bank & Trust (Cedar Rapids Savings Bank; 1896, 1910)

- Location within Iowa Location within the United States
- Location: Roughly bounded by 1st & 5th Aves., SE & 5th & 2nd Sts., SE, Cedar Rapids, Iowa
- Coordinates: 41°58′39″N 91°39′56″W
- Area: 34.45 acres (13.94 ha)
- MPS: Commercial and Industrial Development of Downtown Cedar Rapids, Iowa, ca. 1865 -1965
- NRHP reference No.: 15000757
- Added to NRHP: November 2, 2015

The Cedar Rapids Central Business District Commercial Historic District is a nationally recognized historic district located in Cedar Rapids, Iowa, United States. It was listed on the National Register of Historic Places in 2015. At the time of its nomination it consisted of 60 resources, which included 46 contributing buildings, one contributing structure, 12 non-contributing buildings, and one non-contributing structure. Cedar Rapids was platted on the east bank of the Cedar River as Rapids City in 1841, and it was incorporated under the same name in 1849. Kingston was established on the west bank of the river in 1852. The two smaller communities consolidated in 1870 as Cedar Rapids. The streets were laid out parallel and perpendicular to the river, which flowed from the northwest to the southeast. The Chicago, Iowa and Nebraska Railroad was the first to arrive in the community in 1859 and the tracks were laid on Fourth Street on the eastern edge of the central business district. The first bridge across the river was built at Third Avenue in 1871.

The first commercial buildings in this area were log and wood-frame construction. After the American Civil War they began to be replaced by more substantial masonry structures. The buildings that make up the historic district date from 1880 to 1965, and are representative of the various architectural styles and vernacular building forms that were popular during this time period. While they differ in height and historic use, the buildings all feature masonry facades, ground-floor storefronts, and uniform alignment that creates a uniform street wall. The buildings have housed a variety of commercial functions that include retail, office buildings, banking, post office, public library, industrial, saloon/restaurant, theater, hotel, and a social hall. The Fourth Street Railroad Corridor is the contributing structure, and a parking garage is the non-contributing structure. The following buildings are individually listed on the National Register of Historic Places: Cedar Rapids Post Office and Public Building (1908), Security Building (1908), Sokol Gymnasium (1908), Lattner Auditorium Building (1910), Iowa Building (1914), Hotel Roosevelt (1927), and the Paramount Theatre (1928).
