= Quaker Oats Plant =

Industrial building in Iowa, United States

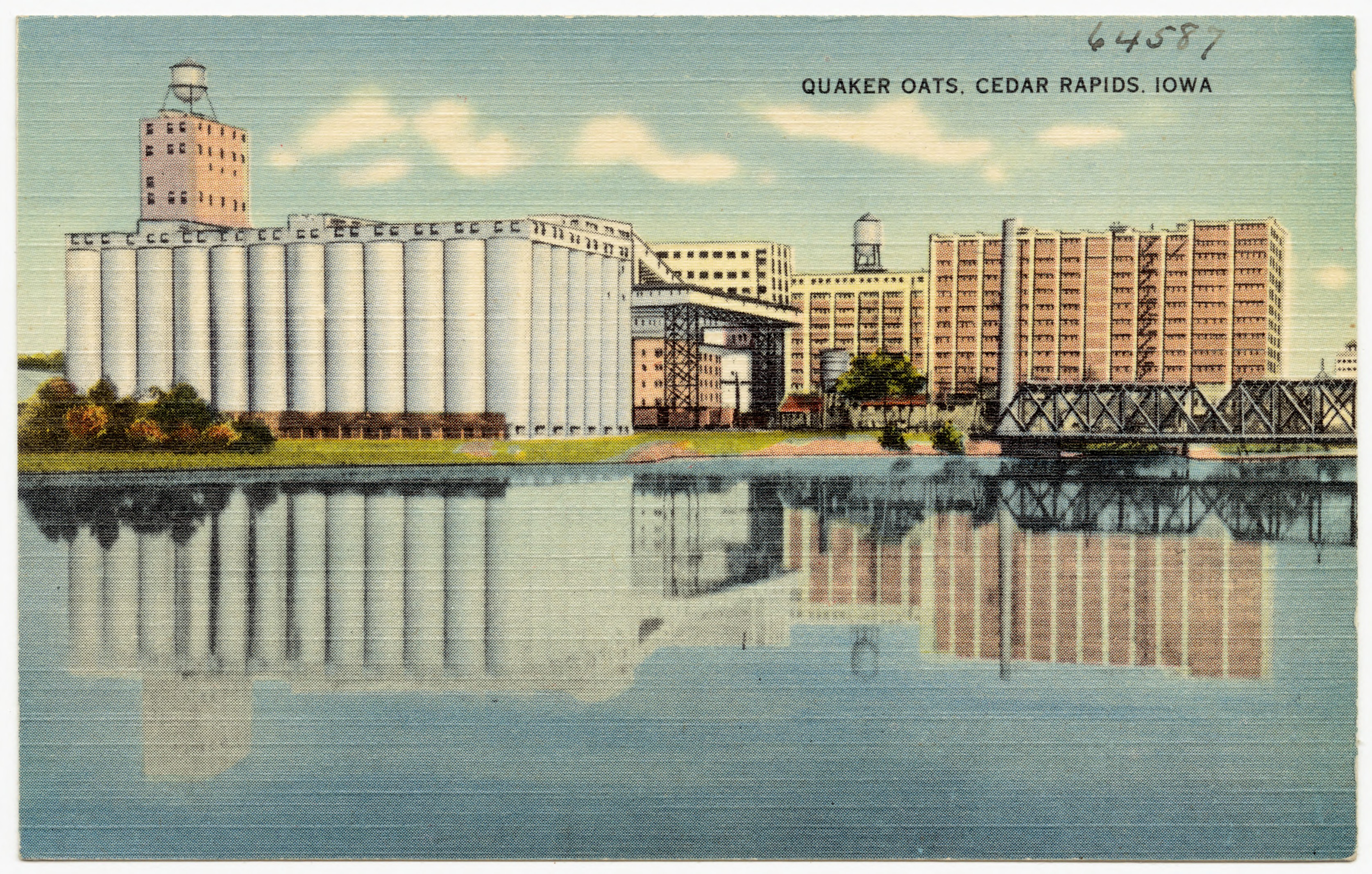

General information
- Status: Operational
- Type: Industrial
- Architectural style: Chicago School
- Location: 418 2nd Street, Cedar Rapids, Iowa, United States
- Coordinates: 41°58′54″N 91°40′14″W
- Completed: 1927
- Owner: Quaker Oats

Height
- Roof: 190 ft (58 m)

Technical details
- Floor count: 13

The Quaker Oats Plant is the largest cereal mill in the world, located in downtown Cedar Rapids, Iowa, United States, alongside the Cedar River, originally founded in 1873, rebuilt after a fire in 1905. It employs about 740 people and produces various cereal products from Canadian sourced oats, including traditional rolled oats and oatmeal.

== Location ==
Located on the north side of downtown, the mill is cut off from the rest of the downtown area by I-380. The west side of the site is alongside Cedar River, which provided the power. On the north and east sides, the site is bounded by Cedar Lake, train yards and other industrial sites. The tallest section of the complex rises 13 floors and 190 feet (58 m) in height. It is currently the 4th-tallest building in Cedar Rapids.

The Plant is served by the Union Pacific Railroad which connects the Plant to grain elevators around the state, there is also a Canadian National line that terminates at the plant, but there is no connection to CN's network.

== Organization, products ==
As of 2022, the facility employed 740 people. It produces rolled oats and oatmeal products as Cap'n Crunch, Life, Quaker Oats Squares, Pearl Milling Company pancake mix and syrup, Instant Quaker Oatmeal, Standard Quaker Oats and others.

== History ==
In 1873, three families started an oats milling operation originally called the North Star Mill. In 1888 seven of the largest American oat millers united to form the American Cereal Company. In 1906 The American Cereal changed its name to The Quaker Oats Company.

On March 7, 1905, an explosion occurred in the mill and much of it was burnt down. At the time the Cedar Rapids Fire Department had no modern fire engines, so many other fire departments in the area sent firemen and fire equipment to help. The main risk was that the fire could spread and burn much of downtown, so the fire engines constantly sprayed water on all the buildings downtown, they kept the fire contained so well that even the neighboring lumber yards were not burnt. There were two casualties, a worker was struck in the head with a flying brick and a first responder went missing during the incident and was presumed dead. The cause of the explosion and resulting fire was said to have been caused by spontaneous combustion.

In 1947, the company installed the electric "neon" sign that is atop the main building; since it was erected, it has been the largest electric sign in Cedar Rapids. The August 10, 2020 derecho caused major damage to the old neon sign, and on June 1 and 2, 2021, the sign was replaced by a nearly identical sign using LEDs, but kept the same historic look.

On June 7, 2018, a fire was reported at the facility. Employees found that an oven on the 10th floor caused the fire.

On October 24, 2026, a fire and explosion were reported at the facility. There were no injuries or deaths.

== Oat source ==
As of 2017, Quaker Oats used oats from Canada, but no longer from Iowa growers. Iowa was the leading US oats producer until 1989; demand for oats decreased as less and less farms needed it as animal forage.

== See also ==
- List of tallest buildings in Iowa
