= National Register of Historic Places listings in Ouachita Parish, Louisiana =

Location of Ouachita Parish in Louisiana

This is a list of the National Register of Historic Places listings in Ouachita Parish, Louisiana.

This is intended to be a complete list of the properties and districts on the National Register of Historic Places in Ouachita Parish, Louisiana, United States. The locations of National Register properties and districts for which the latitude and longitude coordinates are included below, may be seen in a map.

There are 34 properties and districts listed on the National Register in the parish. One property was once listed, but has since been removed.

This National Park Service list is complete through NPS recent listings posted February 20, 2026.

== Current listings ==
| | Name on the Register | Image | Date listed | Location | City or town | Description |
|---|---|---|---|---|---|---|
| 1 | Allen-Barringer House | Allen-Barringer House | May 3, 1982 (#82002790) | Southwest of West Monroe off Elkins Rd. 32°25′33″N 92°11′39″W | West Monroe vicinity | |
| 2 | J.S. Block Building | J.S. Block Building | September 30, 1980 (#80001747) | 101 N. Grand St. 32°29′59″N 92°07′01″W | Monroe | |
| 3 | Bosco Plantation House | Bosco Plantation House | November 18, 2009 (#09000931) | 279 Pipes Ln. 32°17′03″N 92°05′46″W | Bosco | |
| 4 | Boscobel Cottage | Boscobel Cottage | May 7, 1979 (#79001078) | Cordell Lane; 32°17′23″N 92°05′33″W | Bosco | |
| 5 | Bright-Lamkin-Easterling House | Bright-Lamkin-Easterling House | May 15, 1986 (#86001063) | 918 Jackson St. 32°29′42″N 92°06′44″W | Monroe | |
| 6 | Bynum House | Bynum House | January 25, 1997 (#96001611) | 604 Grammont St. 32°30′08″N 92°06′42″W | Monroe | |
| 7 | G.B. Cooley House | G.B. Cooley House | May 15, 1986 (#86001060) | 1011 S. Grand St. 32°29′33″N 92°06′50″W | Monroe | |
| 8 | Downtown Monroe Historic District | Downtown Monroe Historic District | September 4, 1986 (#86002202) | Roughly bounded by Desiard, Jackson, Telemaque, and S. Grand Sts.; also roughly bounded by Ouachita R., Harrison, N. & S. 6th, Washington & Breard Sts. 32°30′01″N 92°06′57″W | Monroe | Second set of address represents a boundary increase approved January 31, 2017. |
| 9 | Roland M. Filhiol House | Roland M. Filhiol House | July 7, 1995 (#95000813) | 111 Stone Ave. 32°29′46″N 92°06′46″W | Monroe | |
| 10 | First United Methodist Church | First United Methodist Church | June 12, 2001 (#01000491) | 101 N. 2nd St. 32°29′58″N 92°07′28″W | West Monroe | |
| 11 | Isaiah Garrett Law Office | Isaiah Garrett Law Office | July 12, 1976 (#76000972) | 520 S. Grand St. 32°29′49″N 92°06′57″W | Monroe | |
| 12 | Grayson House | Grayson House | November 17, 1999 (#99001303) | 2300 DeSiard St. 32°30′50″N 92°05′50″W | Monroe | |
| 13 | Gov. Luther Hall House | Gov. Luther Hall House | May 7, 1979 (#79001079) | 1515 Jackson St. 32°29′N 92°07′W | Monroe | |
| 14 | Harvey House | Harvey House | January 25, 1997 (#96001610) | 608 Grammont St. 32°30′09″N 92°06′42″W | Monroe | |
| 15 | Key-Mize House | Key-Mize House | November 10, 2001 (#01001212) | 118 Copley St. 32°31′08″N 92°08′09″W | West Monroe | |
| 16 | Logtown Plantation | Logtown Plantation | October 16, 1980 (#80001748) | South of Monroe; 32°20′07″N 92°05′24″W | Monroe vicinity | |
| 17 | Lower Pargoud | Lower Pargoud | October 4, 1984 (#84000015) | 2111 S. Grand St. 32°28′54″N 92°06′43″W | Monroe | |
| 18 | Masur House | Masur House | July 22, 1982 (#82002789) | 901 N. 3rd St. 32°30′34″N 92°07′21″W | Monroe | |
| 19 | McClendon House | McClendon House | April 18, 1996 (#96000432) | 309 McClendon; 32°29′53″N 92°07′27″W | West Monroe | |
| 20 | Miller-Roy Building | Miller-Roy Building | March 7, 2011 (#11000075) | 1001 Desiard St. 32°30′25″N 92°06′34″W | Monroe | |
| 21 | Milner Motors | Milner Motors | July 25, 2001 (#01000764) | 212 Walnut St. 32°30′11″N 92°07′08″W | Monroe | |
| 22 | Mineral Springs Christian Methodist Episcopal Church | | November 26, 2025 (#100012343) | 451 New Mineral Springs Rd. 32°27′32″N 92°21′33″W | Calhoun | |
| 23 | Monroe Residential Historic District | Monroe Residential Historic District | October 3, 1996 (#96001062) | Roughly bounded by McKinley St., 7th St., Hudson Lne., and Riverside Dr. 32°31′05″N 92°07′33″W | Monroe | |
| 24 | Mulberry Grove | Mulberry Grove | July 7, 1978 (#78001434) | 1133 S. Grand St. 32°29′29″N 92°06′46″W | Monroe | |
| 25 | Neville High School | Neville High School | May 9, 1985 (#85000973) | 600 Forsythe Ave. 32°31′19″N 92°07′33″W | Monroe | |
| 26 | Ouachita Coca-Cola Bottling Company, Inc.-Ouachita Candy Company, Inc. | Ouachita Coca-Cola Bottling Company, Inc.-Ouachita Candy Company, Inc. | May 9, 2013 (#13000275) | 215 Walnut St. 32°30′11″N 92°07′10″W | Monroe | |
| 27 | Ouachita Parish High School | Ouachita Parish High School | April 9, 1981 (#81000297) | 500 S. Grand St. 32°29′52″N 92°06′58″W | Monroe | |
| 28 | Price's Beauty Shop | | July 8, 2024 (#100010514) | 2101 Grammont Street; 32°30′42″N 92°05′52″W | Monroe | |
| 29 | Rawls Cabin | | August 9, 1991 (#91001047) | 223 Charlie Rawls Rd. 32°20′52″N 92°10′10″W | West Monroe | |
| 30 | Robinson Business College | Robinson Business College | April 18, 1997 (#97000354) | 604 Jack McEnery Ave. 32°28′19″N 92°06′32″W | Monroe | |
| 31 | Slagle House | Slagle House | January 24, 1995 (#94001590) | 1400 S. Grand; 32°29′24″N 92°06′47″W | Monroe | |
| 32 | West Monroe Historic District | | May 20, 2019 (#100003414) | Parts of Commerce, Cotton, Cypress, Natchitoches, Pine, N. Riverfront, Trenton & Wood Sts. 32°30′04″N 92°07′29″W | West Monroe | |
| 33 | Whitehall Plantation House | Whitehall Plantation House | September 8, 1987 (#87001475) | Buckhorn Bend Rd. 32°25′50″N 92°06′50″W | Monroe vicinity | |
| 34 | Wossman House | Wossman House | August 5, 1999 (#99000930) | 1205 St. John Dr. 32°29′27″N 92°06′41″W | Monroe | |

== Former listing ==
| | Name on the Register | Image | Date listed | Date removed | Location | City or town | Description |
|---|---|---|---|---|---|---|---|
| 1 | St. James United Methodist Church | | October 29, 1992 (#92001519) | March 31, 2015 | 916 Adams St. 32°30′35″N 92°06′19″W | Monroe | |

== See also ==
- List of National Historic Landmarks in Louisiana
- National Register of Historic Places listings in Louisiana
