= William J. Brown (architect) =

American architect

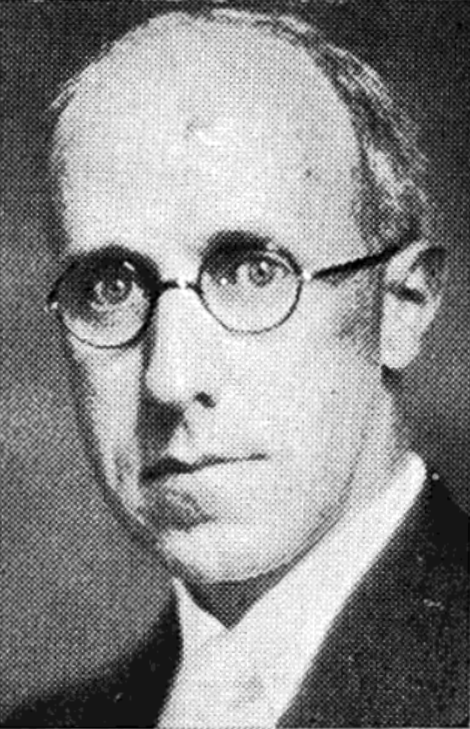
- William J. Brown, c. 1927
- Born: December 10, 1878; Urbana, Illinois
- Died: February 4, 1970 (aged 91); Cedar Rapids, Iowa
- Occupation: Architect
- Practice: Brown Brothers; William J. Brown; Brown & Healey; Brown, Healey & Bock

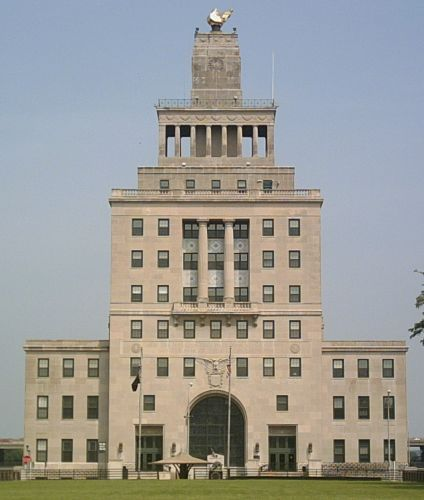
The Veterans Memorial Building in Cedar Rapids, designed by associated architects William J. Brown and Harry E. Hunter, with consulting architect Henry Hornbostel, in the Neoclassical style and completed in 1928.

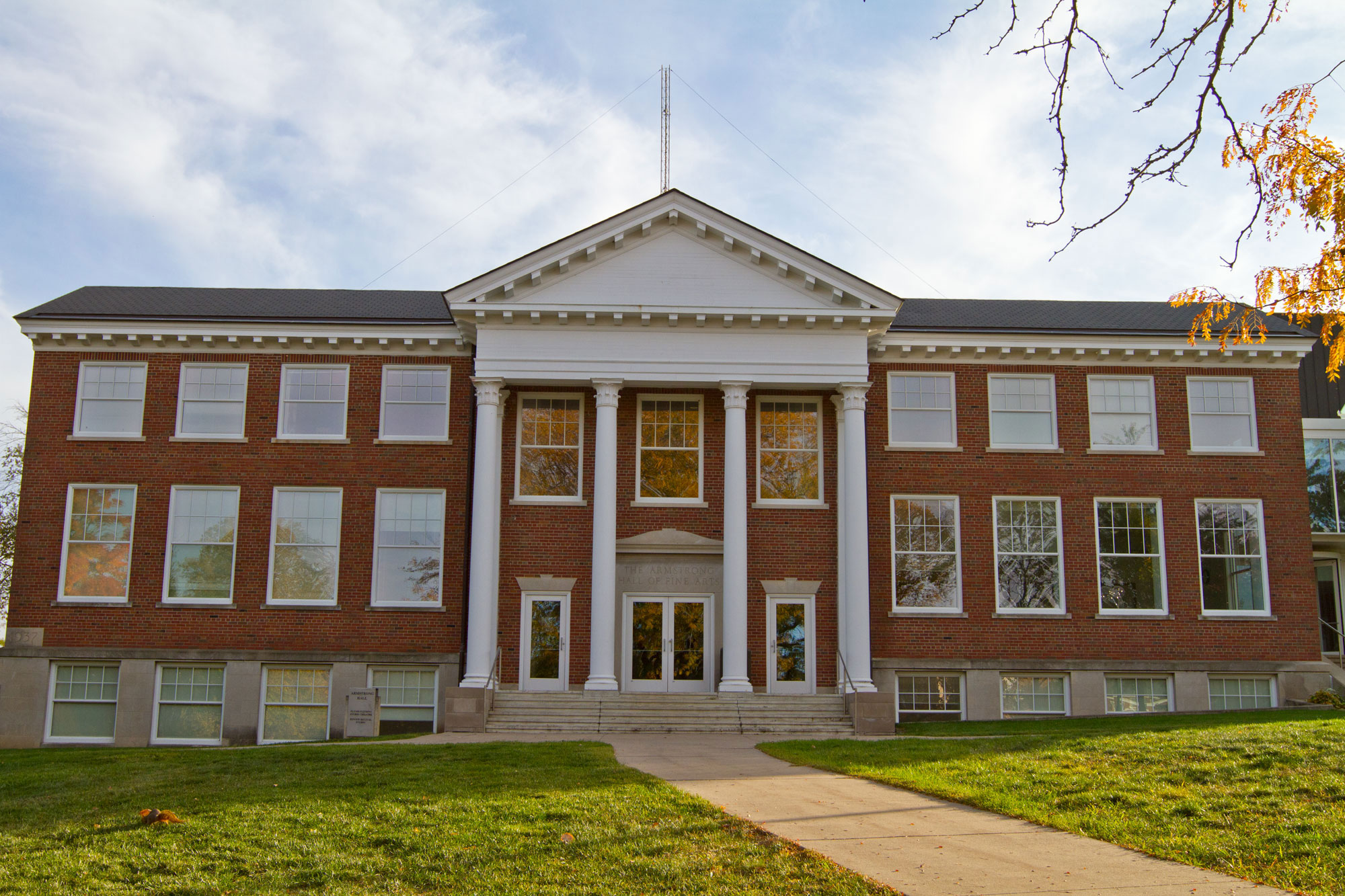
Armstrong Hall of Cornell College, designed by Brown in the Colonial Revival style and completed in 1938.

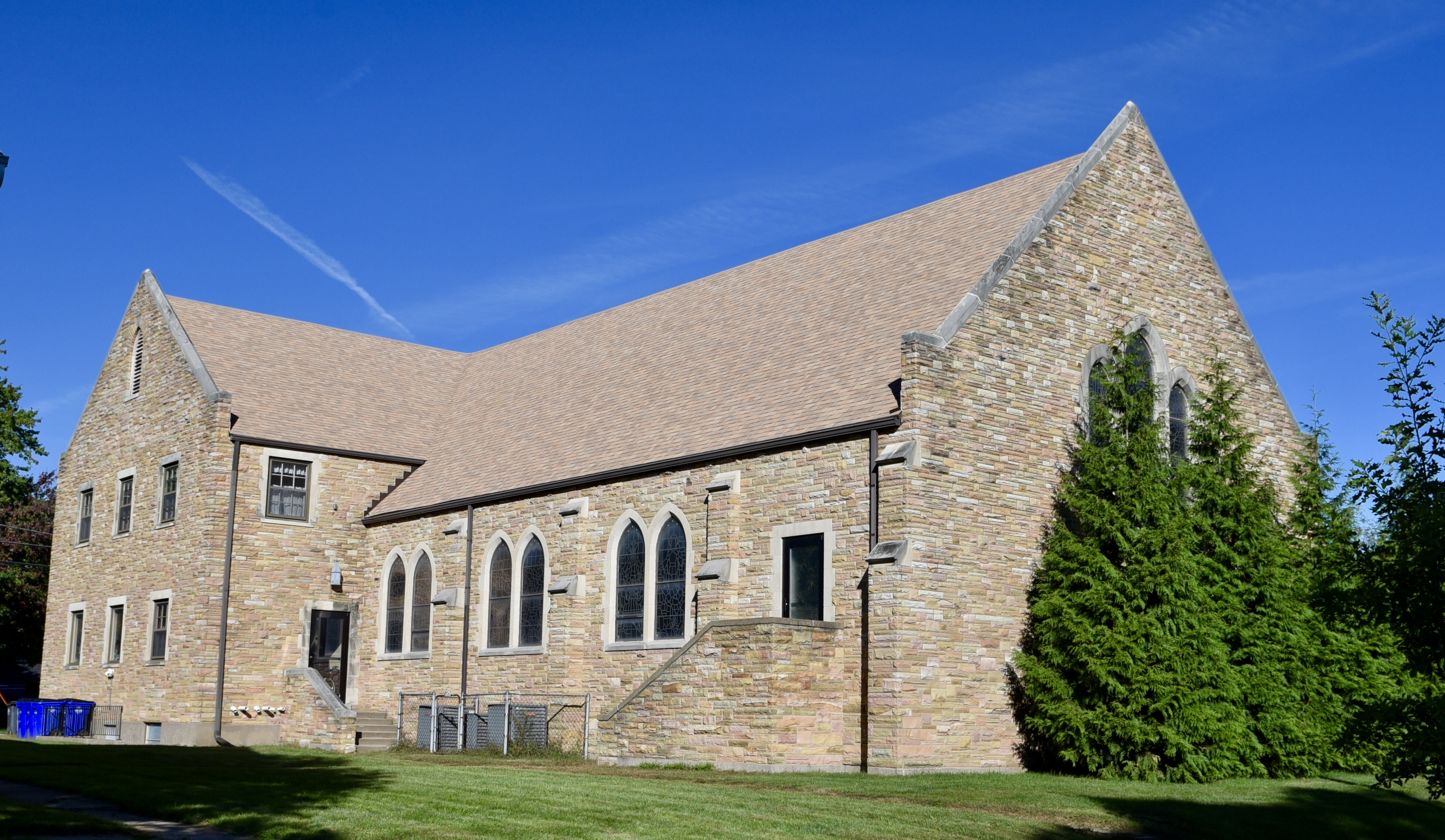
The St. James United Methodist Church in Cedar Rapids, designed by Brown in the Gothic Revival style and completed in 1954.

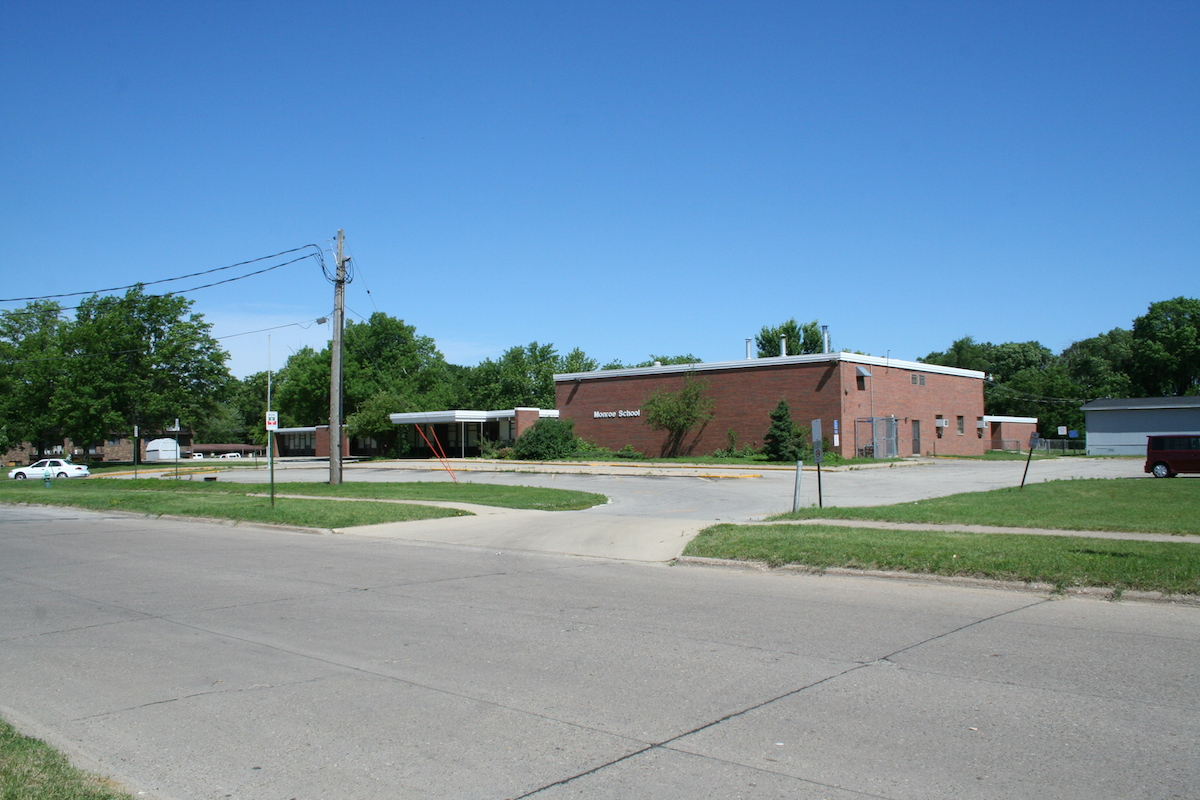
The Monroe Elementary School in Cedar Rapids, designed by Brown & Healey in the International Style and completed in 1961.

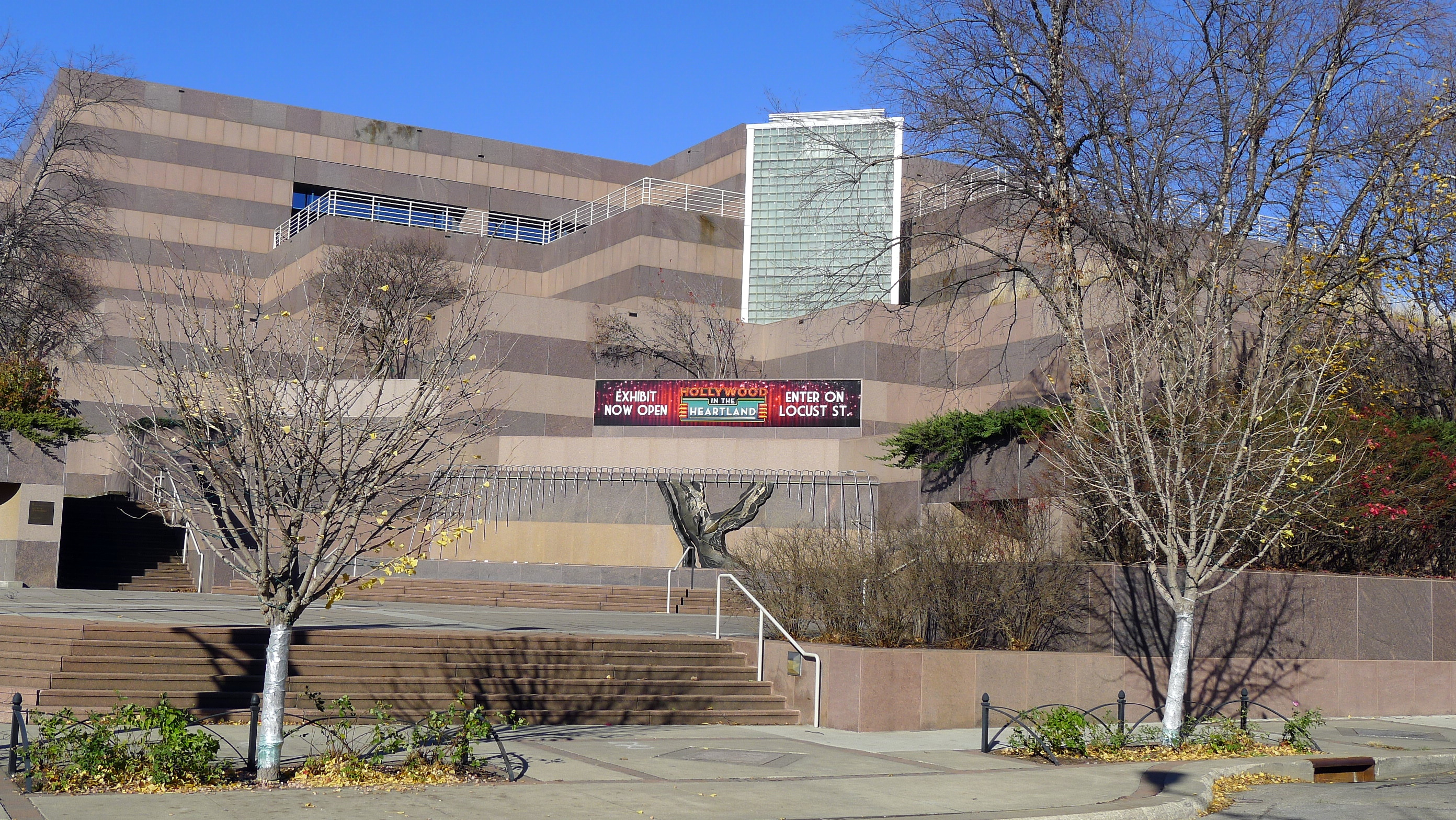
The State Historical Building in Des Moines, designed by Brown Healey Bock in the Postmodern style and completed in 1987.

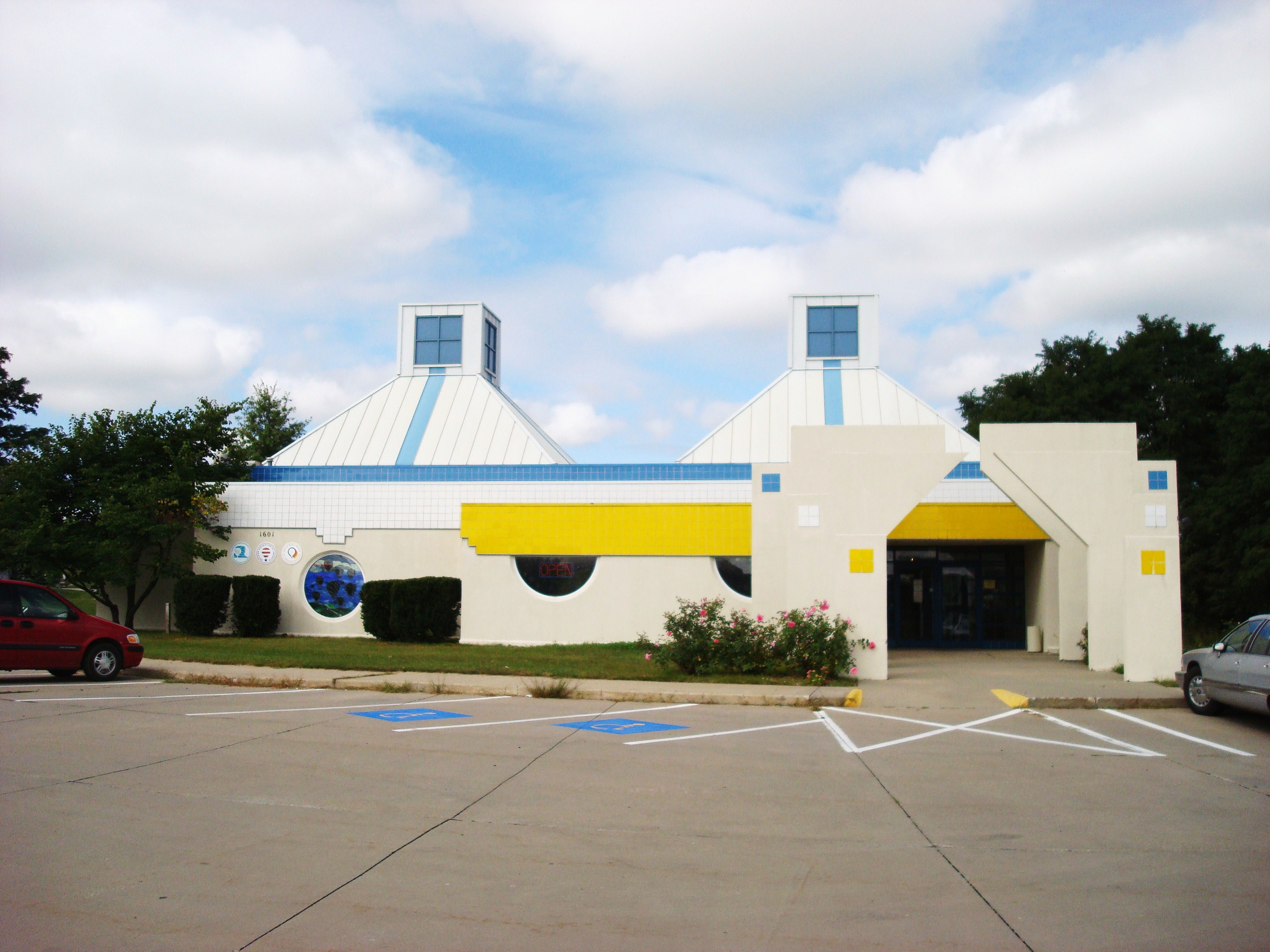
The National Balloon Museum in Indianola, designed by Brown Healey Bock in the Postmodern style and completed in 1988.

William J. Brown AIA (December 10, 1878 – February 4, 1970) was an American architect based in Cedar Rapids in the U.S. state of Iowa. Brown practiced architecture from 1910 until shortly before his death in 1970.

== Life and career ==
William Jay Brown, informally known as Jay Brown, was born December 10, 1878, in Urbana, Illinois, to William G. Brown, deputy clerk of the Champaign County circuit court, and Harriet A. Brown, née Wolfe. He studied architecture at the University of Illinois, graduating in 1900, and worked for prominent architects in Chicago and New York City including Holabird & Roche, Kenneth M. Murchison and John Russell Pope. In January 1910 Brown settled in Cedar Rapids, where he joined his elder brother, Frederick G. Brown, in partnership to form the firm of Brown Brothers. Frederick was also a graduate of the University of Illinois and had previously practiced in Urbana and Danville, Illinois, and in Los Angeles before moving to Cedar Rapids in 1909. His practice in Los Angeles contributed to his local success as an architect of California-style bungalows.

Their first major project, in 1910, was the Knights of Pythias Building. Frederick died in February 1911, but William stayed and completed the building in 1912. He was a sole practitioner for over forty years. In May 1953 he formed the partnership of Brown & Healey with architect Edward H. Healey. In May 1960 engineer Carl V. Bock was made a partner, and in September 1961 the name of the firm was changed to Brown, Healey & Bock. Brown was senior partner of his firm until shortly before his death.

== Personal life ==
Brown was married in 1914 to Isabel Howell. They had two children, both sons. He was a member of the American Institute of Architects (AIA), the Cedar Rapids Country Club and local fraternal organizations. He served on the boards of the Cedar Rapids Art Association, now the Cedar Rapids Museum of Art, and the YMCA. He died February 4, 1970, at the age of 91.

== Legacy ==
After Brown's death, the firm was continued by his partners under the name Brown, Healey & Bock. Over the next decade the partnership was expanded to include architects Herbert M. Stone and Edward G. Sauer, among others. In 1979 Healey was elected a Fellow of the AIA; he was the second and most recent Cedar Rapids architect to receive the honor. In December 1981 the firm incorporated as Brown Healey Bock PC, with Healey as president. In October 1990, with Bock retired, the firm was renamed a final time to Brown Healey Stone & Sauer; Brown's name was kept for historical reasons. Major late works of the firm included the State Historical Building (1987) in Des Moines and the National Balloon Museum (1988) in Indianola, both designed chiefly by Stone. In 2001 the firm merged with the Howard R. Green Company, an engineering and consulting firm. Brown and Green had shared office space in Cedar Rapids when Green established his firm in 1913. That firm, now known as HR Green, still maintains a Cedar Rapids office as of 2024.

Several buildings designed by Brown have been listed on the United States National Register of Historic Places, and others contribute to listed historic districts.

== Architectural works ==
=== Brown Brothers, 1910–1911 ===
- 1911 – Sinclair Memorial Chapel, Coe College, Cedar Rapids, Iowa
  - Designed by Brown Brothers and Charles A. Dieman, associated architects. Destroyed by fire in 1947.
- 1912 – Knights of Pythias Building, 420 1st Ave NE, Cedar Rapids, Iowa.
  - Designed by Brown Brothers and Charles A. Dieman, associated architects. Demolished.

=== William J. Brown, 1911–1953 ===
- 1911 – Mike Ford house, 1900 Linden Dr SE, Cedar Rapids, Iowa
- 1914 – American Building, 118 2nd Ave SE, Cedar Rapids, Iowa
  - Designed by Proudfoot, Bird & Rawson, architects, with William J. Brown, associate architect.
- 1914 – Brown Apartments, 1234 4th Ave SE, Cedar Rapids, Iowa
  - NRHP-listed.
- 1914 – Palace Theatre, 508 Sycamore St, Waterloo, Iowa
  - Demolished.
- 1915 – Grant Vocational High School, 346 2nd Ave SW, Cedar Rapids, Iowa
  - NRHP-listed.
- 1915 – Strand Theatre, 314 3rd Ave SE, Cedar Rapids, Iowa
- 1916 – YMCA, 1st Ave and 5th St NE, Cedar Rapids, Iowa
  - Demolished in 2004.
- 1923 – Ausadie Building, 845 1st Ave SE, Cedar Rapids, Iowa
  - NRHP-listed.
- 1924 – Franklin Middle School, 300 20th St NE, Cedar Rapids, Iowa
  - A contributing resource to the NRHP-listed B Avenue NE Historic District.
- 1928 – Cedar Rapids Scottish Rite Temple, 616 A Ave NE, Cedar Rapids, Iowa
  - Designed by William J. Brown and Henry Hornbostel, associated architects. NRHP-listed.
- 1928 – Elmer Moots house, 710 8th Ave NW, Mount Vernon, Iowa
  - A contributing resource to the NRHP-listed Cornell College-Mount Vernon Historic District.
- 1928 – Veterans Memorial Building, 50 2nd Ave Bridge, Cedar Rapids, Iowa
  - Designed by William J. Brown and Harry E. Hunter, associated architects, with Henry Hornbostel, consulting architect.
- 1930 – Pfeiffer Hall, Cornell College, Mount Vernon, Iowa
  - A contributing resource to the NRHP-listed Cornell College-Mount Vernon Historic District.
- 1936 – Guttenberg Municipal Building, 502 S 1st St, Guttenberg, Iowa
- 1936 – Merner Hall, Cornell College, Mount Vernon, Iowa
  - A contributing resource to the NRHP-listed Cornell College-Mount Vernon Historic District.
- 1938 – Armstrong Hall, Cornell College, Mount Vernon, Iowa
  - A contributing resource to the NRHP-listed Cornell College-Mount Vernon Historic District.
- 1950 – Sinclair Memorial Chapel, Coe College, Cedar Rapids, Iowa
  - Designed by Jens Fredrick Larson, architect, with William J. Brown, associate architect.
- 1952 – St. John's Lutheran Church, 780 Court Ave, Marengo, Iowa
- 1954 – St. James United Methodist Church, 1430 Ellis Blvd NW, Cedar Rapids, Iowa
  - NRHP-listed.

=== Brown & Healey, 1953–1961 ===
- 1956 – McAuley Hall, Mount Mercy University, Cedar Rapids, Iowa
- 1958 – Regis High School, 735 Prairie Dr NE, Cedar Rapids, Iowa
- 1959 – Asbury United Methodist Church, 350 27th Ave SW, Cedar Rapids, Iowa
- 1961 – Armstrong and Douglas Halls, Coe College, Cedar Rapids, Iowa
- 1961 – Madison Elementary School, 1341 Woodside Dr NW, Cedar Rapids, Iowa
- 1961 – Monroe Elementary School, 3200 Pioneer Ave SE, Cedar Rapids, Iowa
  - A contributing resource to the NRHP-listed Monroe Elementary School Historic District.

=== Brown, Healey & Bock, 1961–1981 ===
- 1962 – Christ Episcopal Church, 220 40th St NE, Cedar Rapids, Iowa
- 1962 – First Presbyterian Church, 310 5th St SE, Cedar Rapids, Iowa
  - A complete reconstruction within the deteriorated original church, originally designed by L. B. Dixon of Chicago and completed in 1869.
- 1964 – Regina Hall, Mount Mercy University, Cedar Rapids, Iowa
- 1965 – Pierce Elementary School, 4343 Marilyn Dr NE, Cedar Rapids, Iowa
- 1966 – Gage Memorial Union, Coe College, Cedar Rapids, Iowa
- 1968 – Peterson Hall, Coe College, Cedar Rapids, Iowa
- 1969 – Linn Hall, Kirkwood Community College, Cedar Rapids, Iowa
- 1971 – Elmcrest Country Club clubhouse, 1 Zach Johnson Dr NE, Cedar Rapids, Iowa
- 1978 – Communication Arts Center and Strayer-Wood Theatre, University of Northern Iowa, Cedar Falls, Iowa

=== Brown Healey Bock, 1981–1990 ===
- 1984 – Kruidenier Center, Central College, Pella, Iowa
- 1986 – Eastern Iowa Airport terminal, Cedar Rapids, Iowa
- 1987 – State Historical Building, 600 East Locust St, Des Moines, Iowa
- 1988 – National Balloon Museum, 1601 N Jefferson Way, Indianola, Iowa
- 1989 – DeWitt Community Library, 917 5th Ave, DeWitt, Iowa

=== Brown Healey Stone & Sauer, 1990–2001 ===
- 1992 – Newton Public Library, 100 N 3rd Ave W, Newton, Iowa
- 2002 – Germantown Community Library, N112 W16957 Mequon Rd, Germantown, Wisconsin
