= St. James United Methodist Church =

St. James United Methodist Church may refer to:

- St. James United Methodist Church (Cedar Rapids, Iowa)
- St. James United Methodist Church (Monroe, Louisiana)

== See also ==
- St. James Church (disambiguation)
