= Bright House =

Bright House or BrightHouse may refer to:

== Places ==
- T. B. Bright House and Farmstead, Danville, Kentucky, listed on the National Register of Historic Places in Boyle County, Kentucky
- Bright-Lamkin-Easterling House, Monroe, Louisiana, listed on the National Register of Historic Places in Ouachita Parish, Louisiana
- Bright House (Lewistown, Montana), listed on the National Register of Historic Places in Fergus County, Montana
- Alumni House (College of William & Mary), Virginia, formerly known as Bright House

== Sports venues ==
- Bright House Field, a baseball stadium in Clearwater, Florida
- Bright House Networks Stadium, a football stadium in Orlando, Florida

== Organisations ==
- BrightHouse (retailer), a UK retailer
- Brighthouse Financial, a life insurance provider
- Bright House Networks, a defunct cable television provider
