= Boscobel Cottage =

Historic house in Louisiana, United States

- U.S. National Register of Historic Places
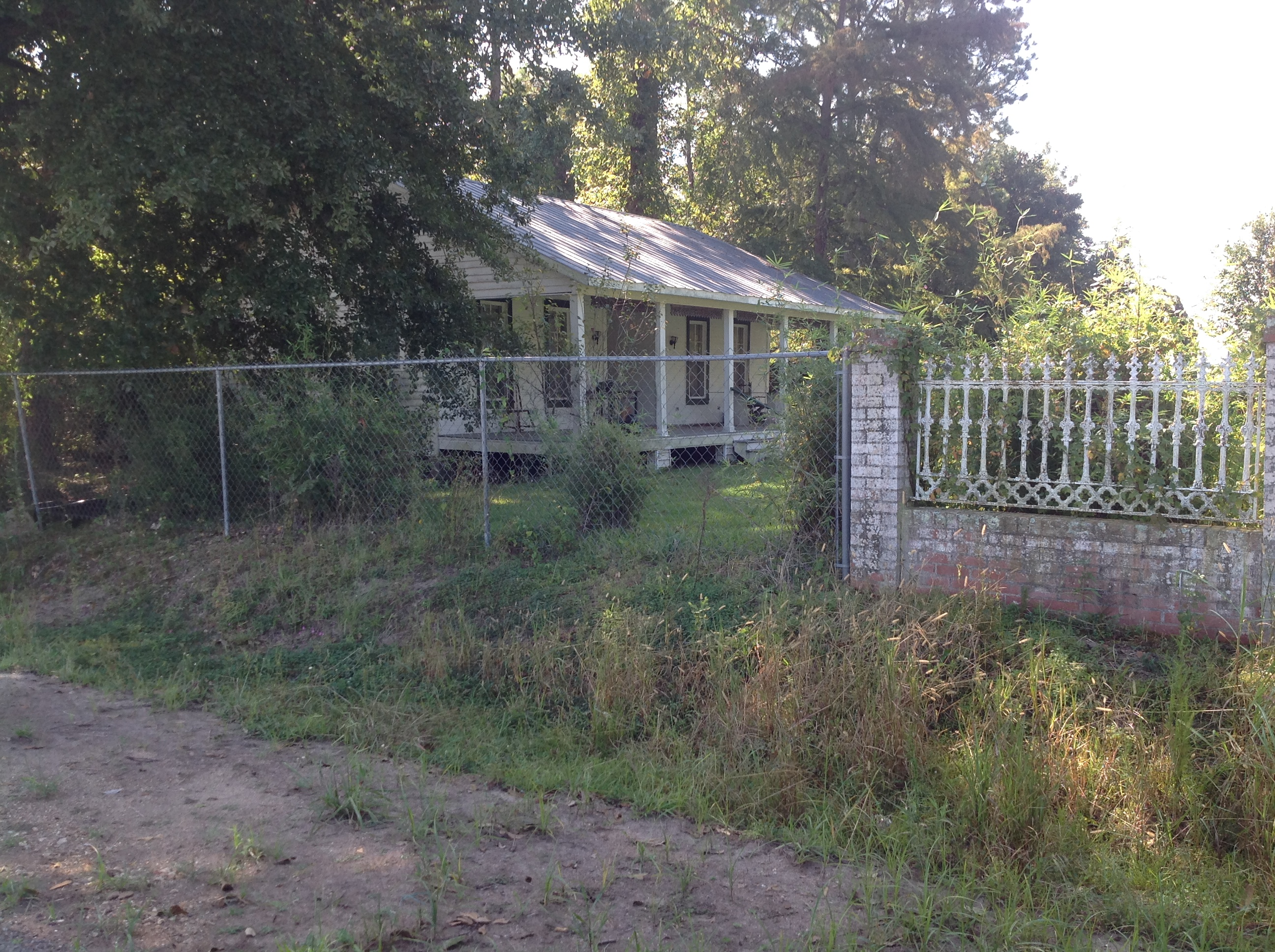

- Location within Louisiana Location within the United States
- Location: Cordell Lane, Bosco, Louisiana, off U.S. Route 165
- Coordinates: 32°17′23″N 92°5′33″W
- Area: 2 acres (0.81 ha)
- Built: 1820
- Built by: Bry, Judge Henry
- Architectural style: Greek Revival, Federal, Central Hallway
- NRHP reference No.: 79001078
- Added to NRHP: May 7, 1979

The Boscobel Cottage, in Bosco in Ouachita Parish, Louisiana, and also known as Lower Boscobel Plantation, is a historic house built in about 1820. It was listed on the National Register of Historic Places in 1979.

It is located on the east bank of the Ouachita River, about 20 miles (32 km) below Monroe, Louisiana, on Cordell Lane, off what is now U.S. Route 165 prior to the main house being built for the plantation.

It was built by Judge Henry Bry. It includes Greek Revival and Federal architecture with a central hallway. The listing included two contributing buildings.

Another cottage from the plantation, the Bosco Plantation House, is also on the National Register of Historic Places.

== See also ==
- Logtown Plantation: also NRHP-listed in Ouachita Parish
- List of plantations in Louisiana
- National Register of Historic Places listings in Ouachita Parish, Louisiana
