= Sam Holmes (baseball) =

American baseball player (1915–2010)

- Born: December 11, 1915; Bosco, Louisiana, U.S.
- Died: November 8, 2010 (aged 94)

Teams
- Monroe Monarchs; Denver White Elephants

Samuel Mitchell Holmes Sr. (December 11, 1915–November 8, 2010), was an American professional baseball player. He played in the Negro leagues for the Monroe Monarchs (though it is assumed he played for them after they left the major Negro Southern League following 1932), and the Denver White Elephants, a semi-professional team.

He was born in Bosco, Louisiana.
