= Ausadie Building =

- U.S. National Register of Historic Places
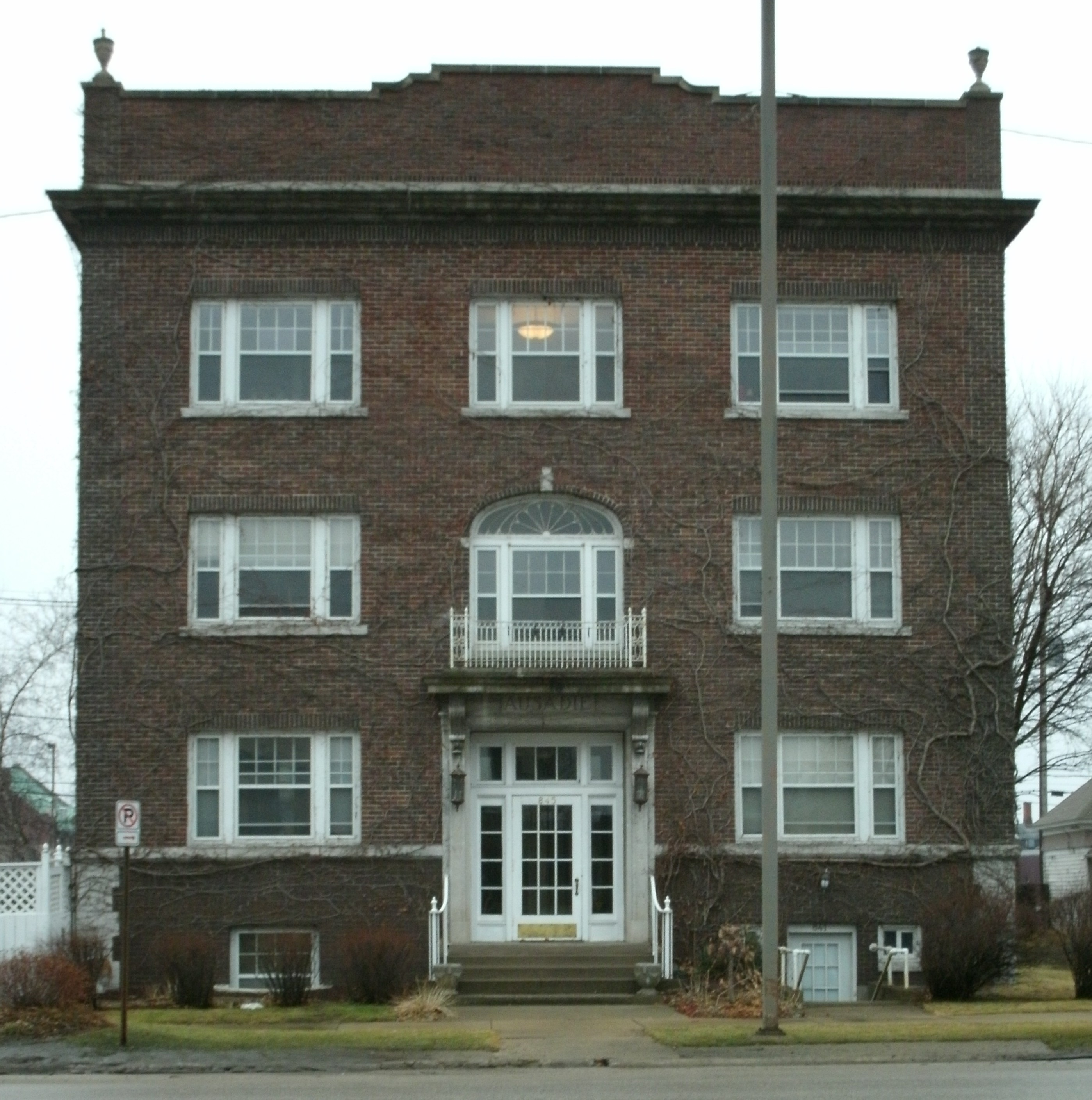

- Location within Iowa Location within the United States
- Location: 845 First Ave. SE; Cedar Rapids, Iowa
- Coordinates: 41°58′59″N 91°39′37″W
- Area: less than one acre
- Built: 1923
- Built by: Loomis Bros. Construction
- Architect: William J. Brown
- Architectural style: Colonial Revival; Bungalow/Craftsman
- NRHP reference No.: 04001324
- Added to NRHP: December 06, 2004

The Ausadie Building, at 845 First Ave. SE, in Cedar Rapids, Iowa is a historic building that is listed on the National Register of Historic Places (NRHP). It is a three-story building on a footprint 44 feet (13 m) wide by 127 feet (39 m) deep and was built in 1923. It was designed by architect William J. Brown of Cedar Rapids. The design shows some Colonial Revival influence and interior features reflect some Bungalow/Craftsman styling.

It was listed on the NRHP in 2004. The listing includes a multiple dwelling, a secondary structure, and a garden.

The building was built by Loomis Bros. Construction, who also built the Consistory Building No. 2 at 616 A Ave. NE, in Cedar Rapids, another NRHP-listed building.
