= Logtown Plantation =

Historic house in Louisiana, United States

- U.S. National Register of Historic Places
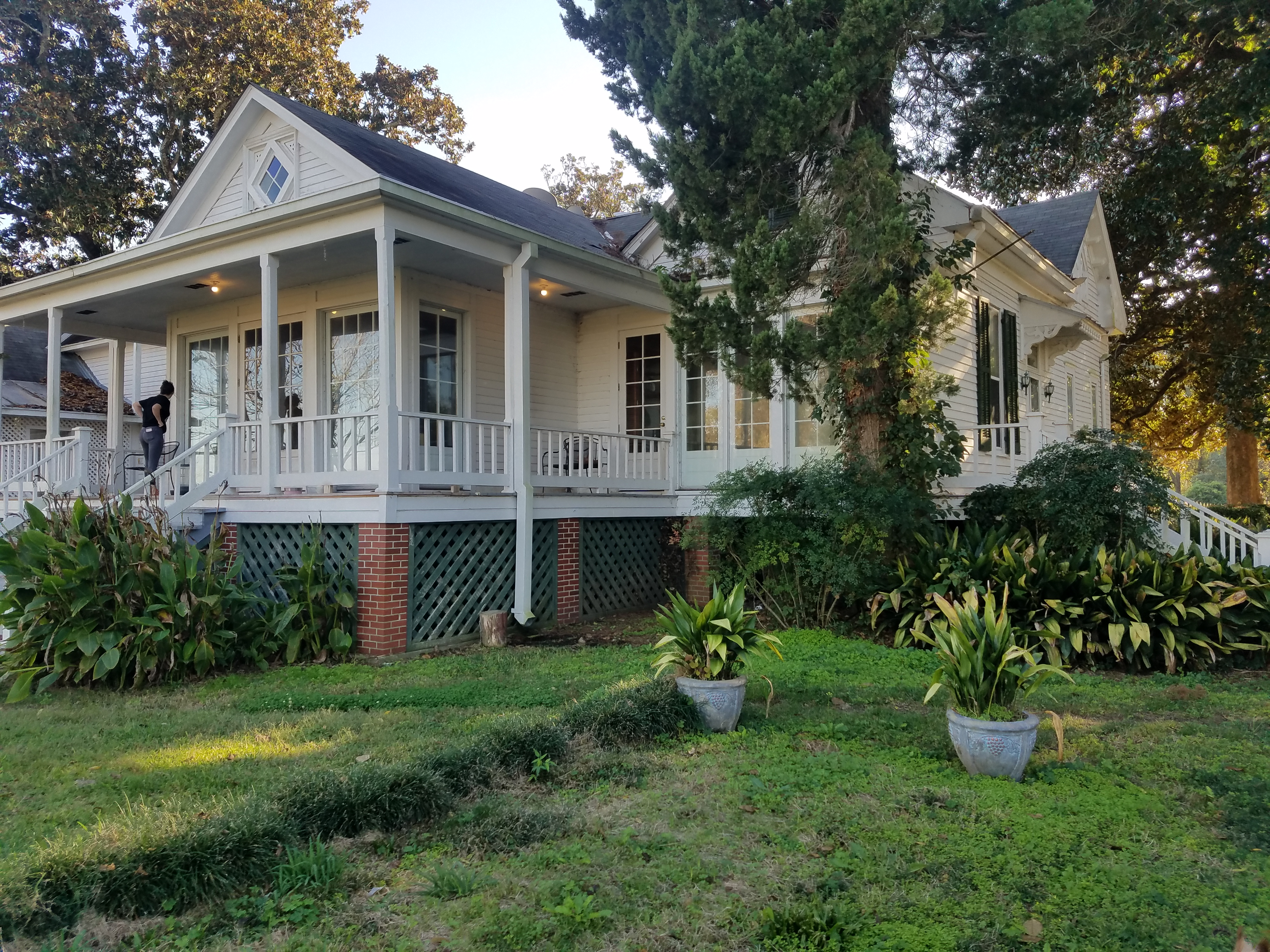

- Location within Louisiana Location within the United States
- Nearest city: Monroe, Louisiana, U.S.
- Area: 12 acres (4.9 ha)
- Built: 1840
- Built by: Jean Baptiste Filhiol
- Architectural style: Federal
- NRHP reference No.: 80001748
- Added to NRHP: October 16, 1980

The Logtown Plantation is a Southern plantation with a historic house located south of Monroe, Louisiana, USA. The house was designed in the Federal architectural style. It has been listed on the National Register of Historic Places since October 16, 1980.

== See also ==
- List of plantations in Louisiana
- Boscobel Plantation Cottage and Bosco Plantation House: NRHP-listed in Ouachita Parish
- National Register of Historic Places listings in Ouachita Parish, Louisiana
