= Bosco Plantation House =

Historic house in Louisiana, United States

- U.S. National Register of Historic Places
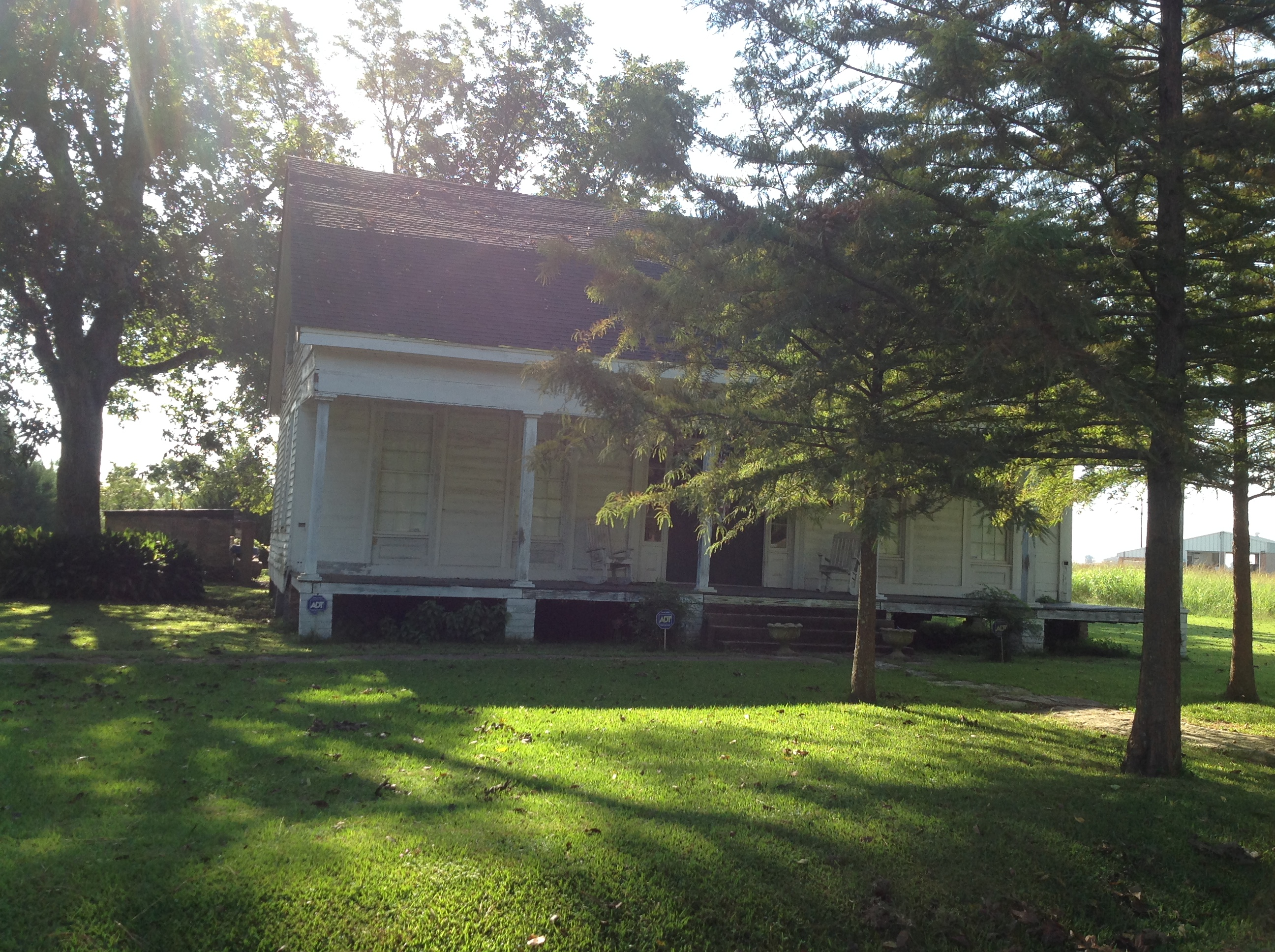

- Location within Louisiana Location within the United States
- Location: 279 Pipes Ln., Bosco, Louisiana, in Ouachita Parish, Louisiana
- Coordinates: 32°17′8″N 92°5′40″W
- Area: 1.9 acres (0.77 ha)
- Built: 1835
- Architectural style: Greek Revival
- NRHP reference No.: 09000931
- Added to NRHP: November 18, 2009

The Bosco Plantation House, in Bosco, Louisiana is a historic plantation house built in about 1835. It was listed on the National Register of Historic Places in 2009.

It is a one-and-a-half-story frame cottage.

The nearby Boscobel Cottage is one of three surviving Bosco plantation cottages, and is in the most preserved condition.

== See also ==
- Logtown Plantation: also NRHP-listed in Ouachita Parish
- List of plantations in Louisiana
- National Register of Historic Places listings in Ouachita Parish, Louisiana
