= Cornell College-Mount Vernon Historic District =

Historic district in Iowa, United States

- Cornell College-Mount Vernon; Historic District
- U.S. National Register of Historic Places
- U.S. Historic district
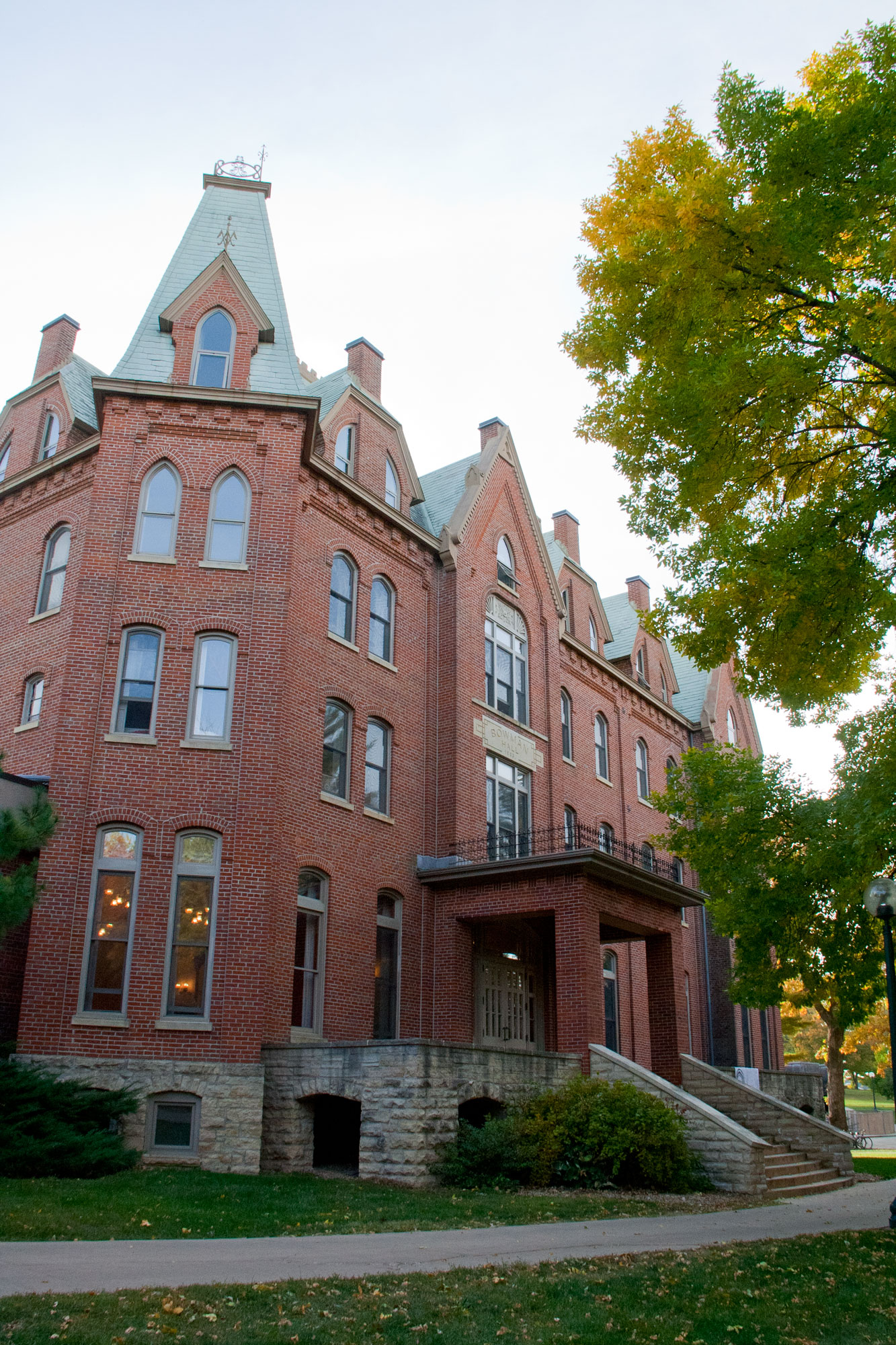
- Bowman Hall (1885)

- Location within Iowa Location within the United States
- Location: Roughly bounded by railroad tracks, College Boulevard, N. 10th, N. 8th, and S. 3rd Aves., and N. 2nd and S. 4th Sts., Mount Vernon, Iowa
- Coordinates: 41°55′34″N 91°25′29″W
- Area: 100 acres (40 ha)
- Architect: William Jay Brown, others
- Architectural style: Late 19th and 20th Century Revivals; Greek Revival; Late Victorian
- NRHP reference No.: 80001456
- Added to NRHP: July 18, 1980

The Cornell College-Mount Vernon Historic District is a nationally recognized historic district located in Mount Vernon, Iowa, United States. It was listed on the National Register of Historic Places in 1980. The district embraces the campus of Cornell College and the residential area that surrounds it. It is composed of 120 buildings and structures, of which 70 are residential. There are also a couple of churches on the east side of the district, and an old hotel was converted into apartments.

People began to settle here as early as 1836 and the city was platted in 1847. The Methodist Episcopal Church established the Iowa Conference Male and Female Seminary here in 1853, and it changed its name to Cornell College four years later. King Memorial Chapel (1876) is individually listed on the National Register. The Chicago and North Western Railroad came to town in 1859. After the American Civil War the town's economy expanded with larger factories, and the area's prosperity included the vast agricultural lands that surround Mount Vernon. The first period of growth in the 1850s saw several brick residences built, and a second period of growth from 1885 to 1900 saw a large number of frame residences built. Early residential development began around the college campus on its east and north side. By the early 1900s development reached the west side of the campus. Construction of buildings on the Cornell Campus continued after the post-World War II population boom. Architect William Jay Brown designed college buildings in the 1930s, the Cedar Rapids architectural firm Green and Co. designed buildings in the 1950s, and Harry Weese and Associates in the 1960s. Residential construction has also continued here into the late 20th century.
