= Brown Apartments (Cedar Rapids, Iowa) =

- U.S. National Register of Historic Places
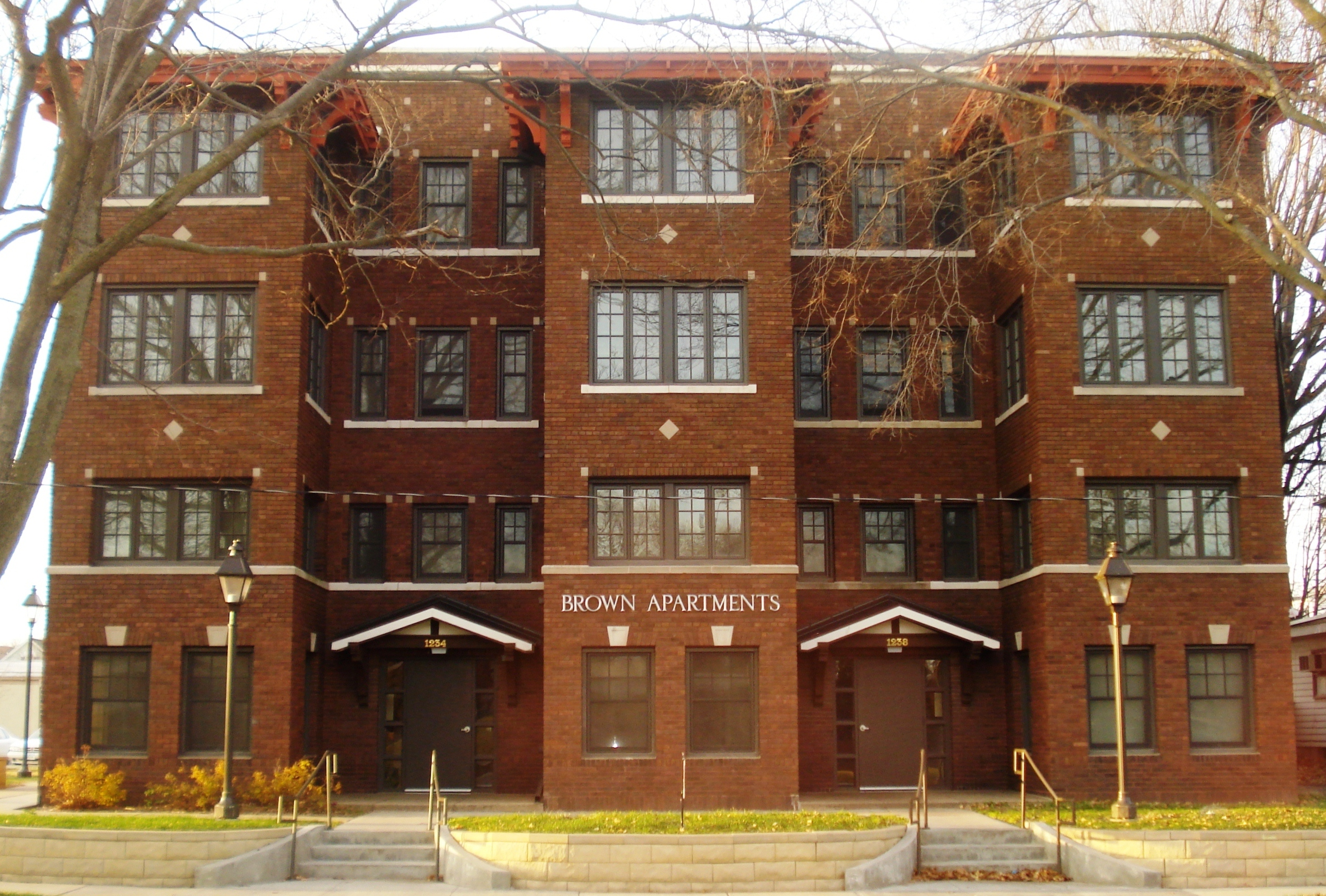

- Location within Iowa Location within the United States
- Location: 1234 4th Ave. SE; Cedar Rapids, Iowa
- Coordinates: 41°58′59.5″N 91°39′15.7″W
- Area: less than one acre
- Built: 1914
- Architect: William J. Brown
- Architectural style: Bungalow/Craftsman
- NRHP reference No.: 10000075
- Added to NRHP: March 17, 2010

Brown Apartments is a historic building located in Cedar Rapids, Iowa, United States. Designed by local architect William J. Brown, this is an early example of an apartment suites building type and the first known English basement apartment building in the city. Other innovations from the time of construction include the janitor's living quarters, a common laundry room, and tenant storage areas. The building's first owners were Arthur and Elizabeth Brown. He was an ice cream manufacturer and marketer, and it is unknown if he was related to the architect. The four-story, brick structure features American Craftsman influences. The symmetrical facade consists of three projecting solarium bays between which are the entry ways into the building. Both of the entry porches has heavy wooden brackets, and each bay is capped with distinctive wood parapets that are supported by heavy timber brackets. Regionalist painter Marvin Cone lived in the building from 1920 to 1923. He dedicated two oil paintings to the Browns in lieu of rent. The building was listed on the National Register of Historic Places in 2010.
