= First United Methodist Church (West Monroe, Louisiana) =

Historic church in Louisiana, United States

- U.S. National Register of Historic Places
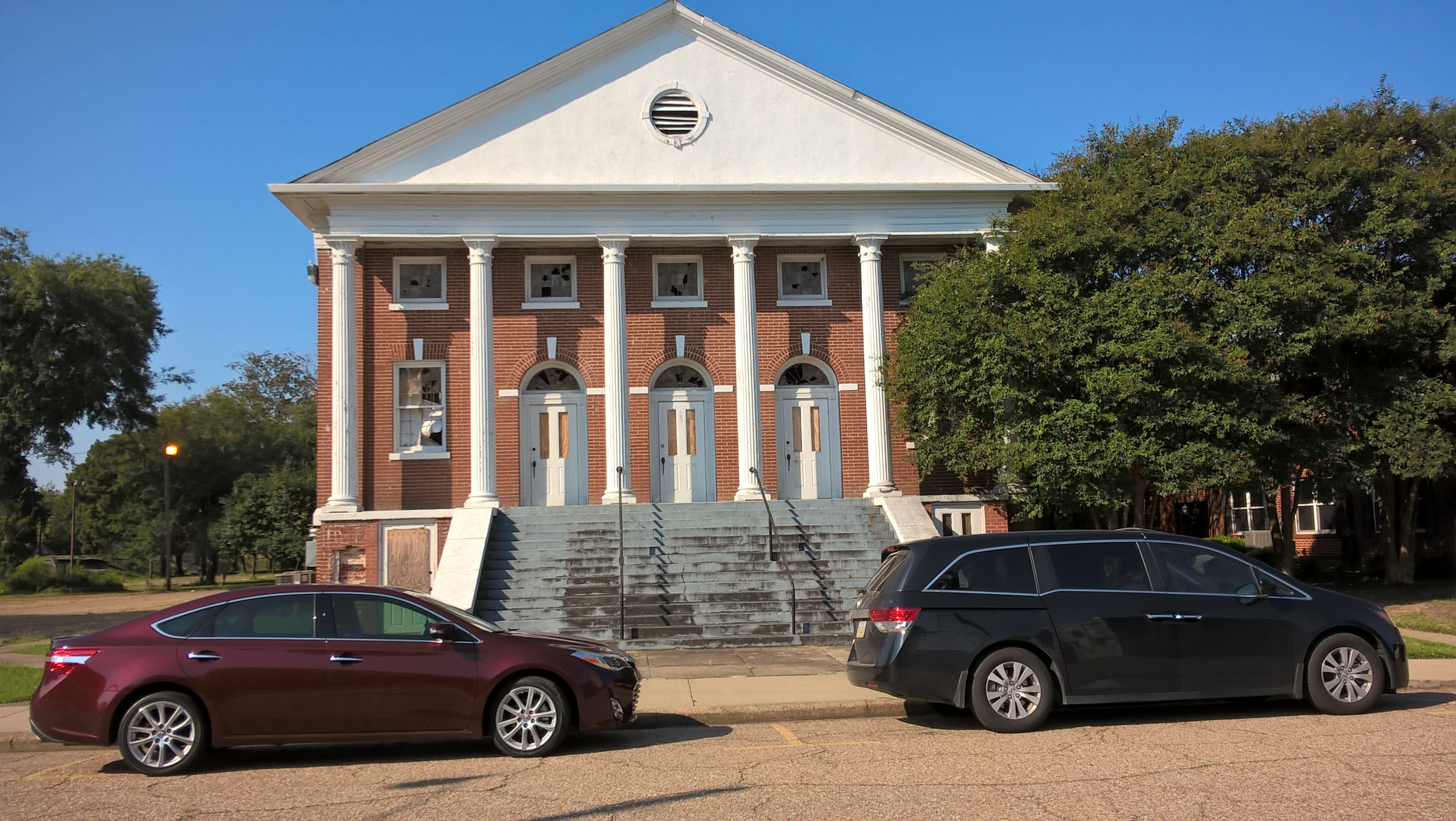

- Location within Louisiana Location within the United States
- Location: 101 N. 2nd St., West Monroe, Louisiana
- Coordinates: 32°29′58″N 92°7′28″W
- Area: 1.7 acres (0.69 ha)
- Built: 1920
- Architectural style: Colonial Revival
- NRHP reference No.: 01000491
- Added to NRHP: June 12, 2001

First United Methodist Church is a historic Methodist church at 101 N. 2nd Street in West Monroe, Louisiana. It was added to the National Register in 2001.

Its main block is a Colonial Revival-style two-and-one-half story masonry church erected in 1920. A two-story education wing was added between 1945 and 1950.

It was deemed notable "as a rare and monumental example of the Colonial Revival style."

== See also ==
- St. James United Methodist Church (Monroe, Louisiana)
- National Register of Historic Places listings in Ouachita Parish, Louisiana
