= Grant Vocational High School =

- U.S. National Register of Historic Places
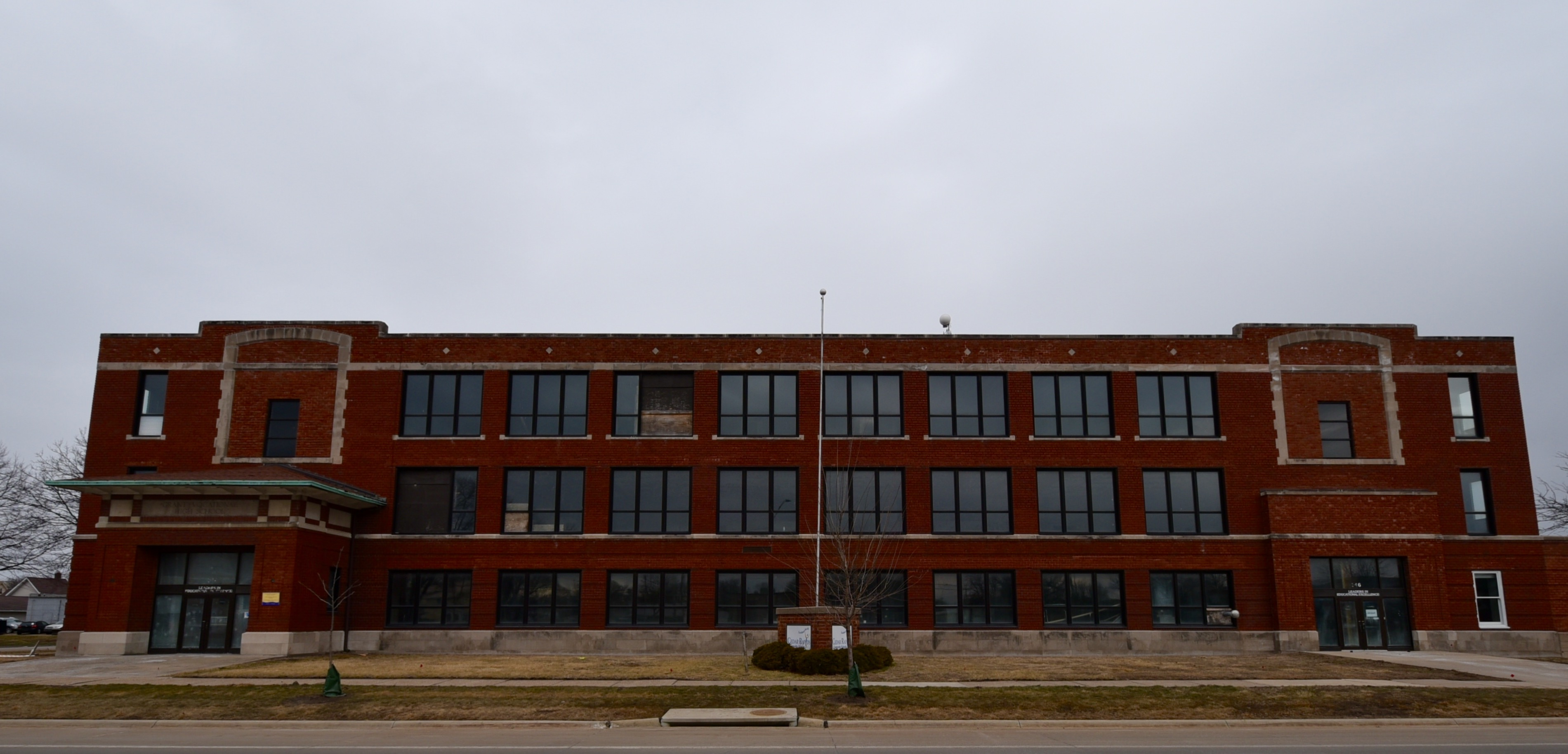

- Location within Iowa Location within the United States
- Location: 346 2nd Ave., SW; Cedar Rapids, Iowa
- Coordinates: 41°58′27.3″N 91°40′37.8″W
- Area: less than one acre
- Built: 1915
- Built by: F.P. Gould Company
- Architect: William J. Brown
- Architectural style: Prairie School
- NRHP reference No.: 15000728
- Added to NRHP: October 13, 2015

Grant Vocational High School, also known as the Board of Education and the Cedar Rapids School District Central Office, is a historic building located in Cedar Rapids, Iowa, United States. Completed in 1915, this is a rare example of a vocational high school in Iowa as only a handful were ever built. While it offered various student activities in athletics and the arts, its curriculum was based on the manual arts instead of humanities or college preparatory courses. A Progressive Era idea, vocational education began in Cedar Rapids in 1904. Within a year there was a call for a dedicated vocational high school. There was much debate as the local school district's regular high school was beyond capacity and there was a need for new elementary schools. Efforts to build the school began with the passage of a bond referendum in 1911. Cedar Rapids architect William J. Brown designed the three-story, brick Prairie School structure and it was built by the F.P. Gould Company of Omaha.

While the school started strong, it soon failed to live up to expectations as vocational education was expensive to operate and enrollment was voluntary. Because the building is not unlike a regular high school, it was converted to that purpose in 1924. In 1936 Cedar Rapids experienced another round of school construction and Grant was converted into an office building for the school district. It served that purpose until 2008. The building now houses commercial enterprises. It was listed on the National Register of Historic Places in 2015.
