= Bosco, Louisiana =

Unincorporated community in Louisiana, U.S.

Bosco
- Unincorporated community
- Location in Louisiana
- Coordinates: 32°17′23″N 92°4′52″W
- Country: United States
- State: Louisiana
- Parish: Ouachita
- Time zone: UTC−6 (CST)
  - Summer (DST): UTC−5 (CDT)
- Area code: 318
- GNIS feature ID: 553755

Bosco is an unincorporated community in Ouachita Parish, Louisiana, United States. The community is positioned off U.S. Route 165 near the boundary with Caldwell Parish and is located 12 miles north of Columbia, 15 miles south of Monroe and 23 miles west of Winnsboro.

== History ==
It was named after the Boscobel plantation. Two remaining buildings, Boscobel Plantation Cottage and Bosco Plantation House, are listed on the National Register of Historic Places.

Negro league baseball player Sam Holmes was born in Bosco.
