= St. James United Methodist Church (Cedar Rapids, Iowa) =

- Trinity-St. James United Methodist Church
- U.S. National Register of Historic Places
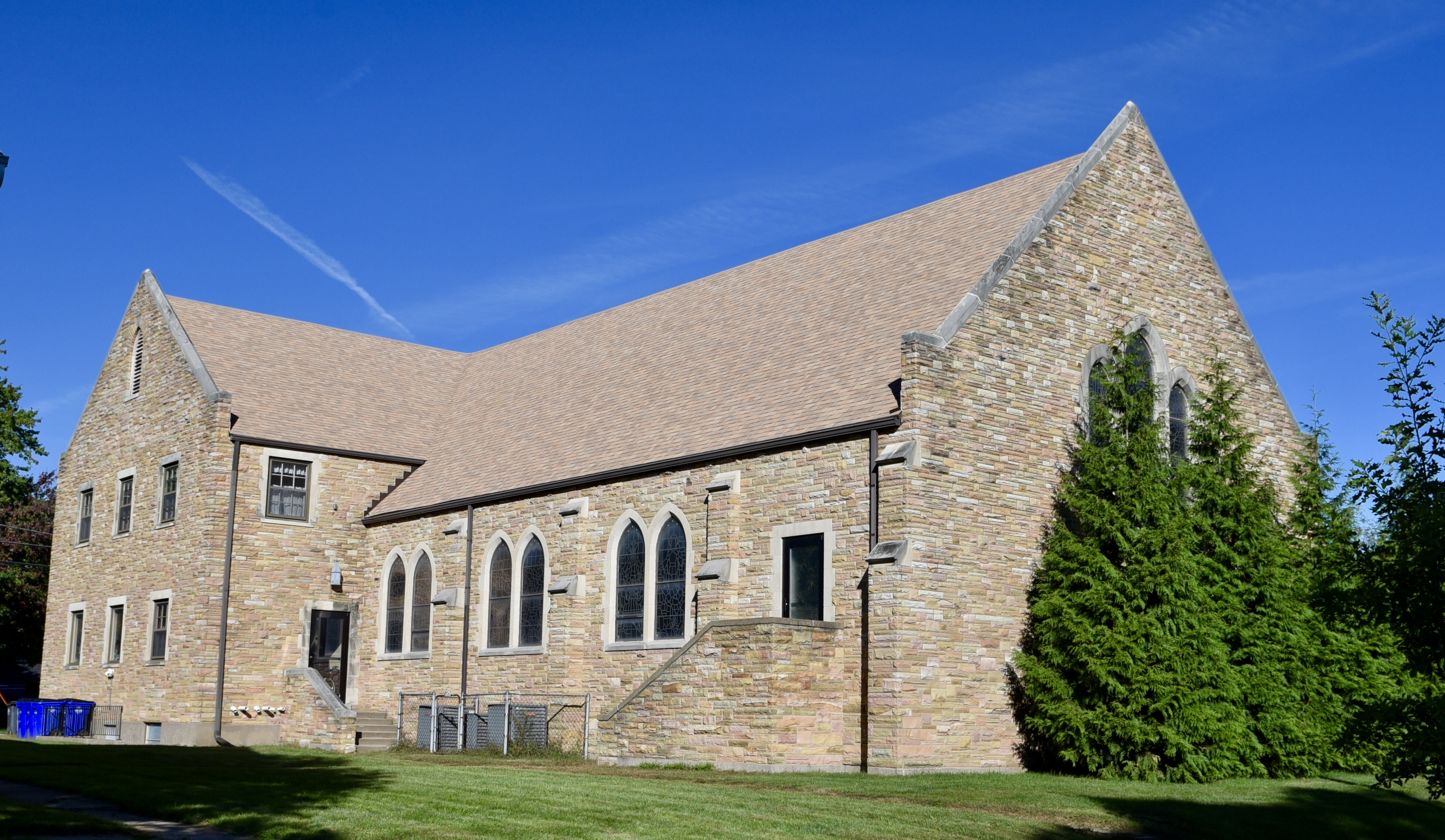

- Location within Iowa Location within the United States
- Location: 1430 Ellis Blvd., NW; Cedar Rapids, Iowa
- Coordinates: 41°59′14.8″N 91°40′57.1″W
- Area: 1.5 acres (0.61 ha)
- Built: 1952-1954
- Architect: William J. Brown
- Architectural style: Gothic Revival
- MPS: Religious Properties of Cedar Rapids, MPS
- NRHP reference No.: 15000894
- Added to NRHP: December 15, 2015

Trinity-St. James United Methodist Church is located in Cedar Rapids, Iowa, United States. The congregation began as a Sunday school in the northwest part of the city organized by Trinity Methodist Episcopal Church. The evangelist Billy Sunday had preached a revival there and over 300 people joined the church. St. James Methodist Episcopal Church, as it was then known, was established shortly afterward in February 1910. The congregation originally used the closed Danish Lutheran Church at K Avenue NW and Fourth Street NW for their services, and they moved the building that summer to Ellis Boulevard NW. St. James grew to the point that a new building was needed. In 1945 property across the street was purchased, and local architect William J. Brown designed the new church facility. Construction began in September 1952 and it was completed in April 1954 for $165,000.

The church building is a modern interpretation of the Gothic Revival style. The gabled-ell form structure houses the sanctuary, administrative, educational and social spaces. Brown utilized the Interdenominational Bureau of Architecture's guide Planning Church Architecture: Designs, Floor Plans and Recommendations to Help in Planning Church Buildings for Worship, Religious Education, and Fellowship Activities to Cost from $30,000.00 to $850,000.00 (1945) for the basis of his work. The exterior is composed of Tennessee quartzite stone with Bedford stone trim. T. Marion Jones built the wooden furnishings and Universal Art Glass Studios of Winona, Minnesota created the stained glass windows. The sanctuary has a seating capacity of 300, and there are 16 classrooms in the building. It received some damage in a 2008 flood that allowed the gymnasium to be returned to its original use after having been converted into office space. The building was listed on the National Register of Historic Places in 2015.

In July 2015 St. James UMC and Trinity UMC entered into a Cooperative Parish agreement. The idea was to combine their ministry efforts to better serve the community. They shared a pastor and their resources. Services were held at 9:00 AM at St. James and 10:30 AM at Trinity. A leadership council was formed to get input from both congregations. In 2016 several listening sessions were held with both congregations to find out what the congregations wanted to see of their future together. In May 2017 a vote was held at both churches regarding the merger of the two congregations into one. The vote was unanimous at both churches in favor of a merger. On Jun 4, 2017 a church conference was held, led by District Superintendent Rev. Kiboko Kiboko. At that time, St. James United Methodist Church and Trinity United Methodist churches ceased to be, and the new congregation of Trinity-St. James United Methodist Church was formed.
