= J.S. Block Building =

- Block, J. S., Building
- U.S. National Register of Historic Places
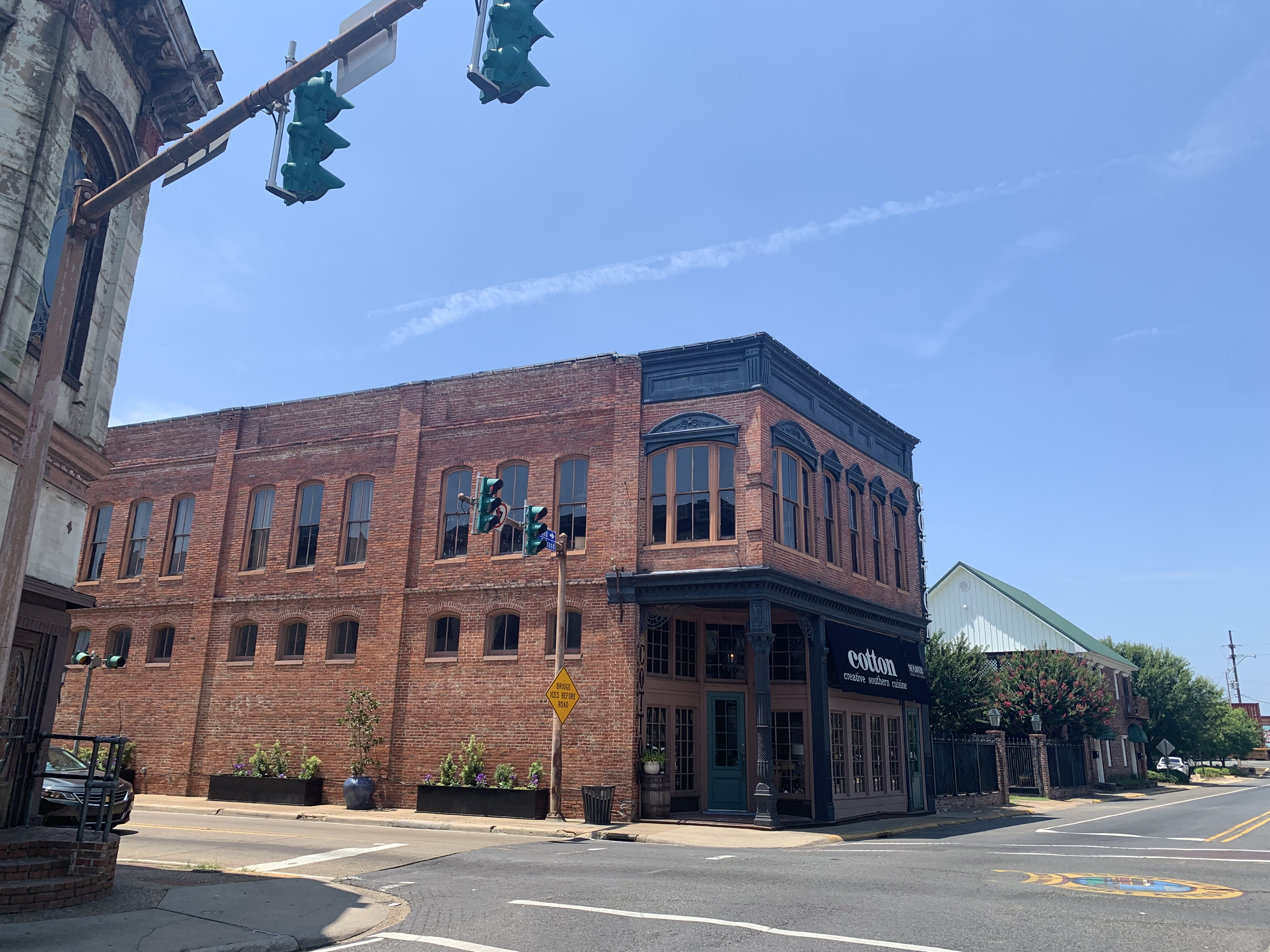

- Location within Louisiana
- Location: 101 N. Grand St., Monroe, Louisiana
- Coordinates: 32°29′59″N 92°07′01″W
- Area: 1 acre (0.40 ha)
- Built: 1893
- NRHP reference No.: 80001747
- Added to NRHP: September 30, 1980

J. S. Block Building, also known as the Ferd Levi Building, is a historic commercial building in Monroe, Louisiana. Built in 1893, it became notable as the headquarters for Jacob Bloch's pioneering mail-order liquor business.

== History ==
Jacob Bloch, a Monroe businessman, established one of the first mail-order liquor dealerships in the city at this location. Bloch's enterprise, which operated around the turn of the 20th century, capitalized on the mail-order market during the rise of Prohibition.

Featuring a blend of elaborate cast-iron Corinthian columns and a decorative iron shop front, the building is a fine example of late 19th-century commercial architecture.

Bloch was a significant figure in Monroe, serving on the City Council and being involved in local banking and civic activities. After the end of his liquor business, the building housed various establishments, maintaining its historic character.
