= Cedar Rapids Scottish Rite Temple =

- Consistory Building No. 2
- U.S. National Register of Historic Places
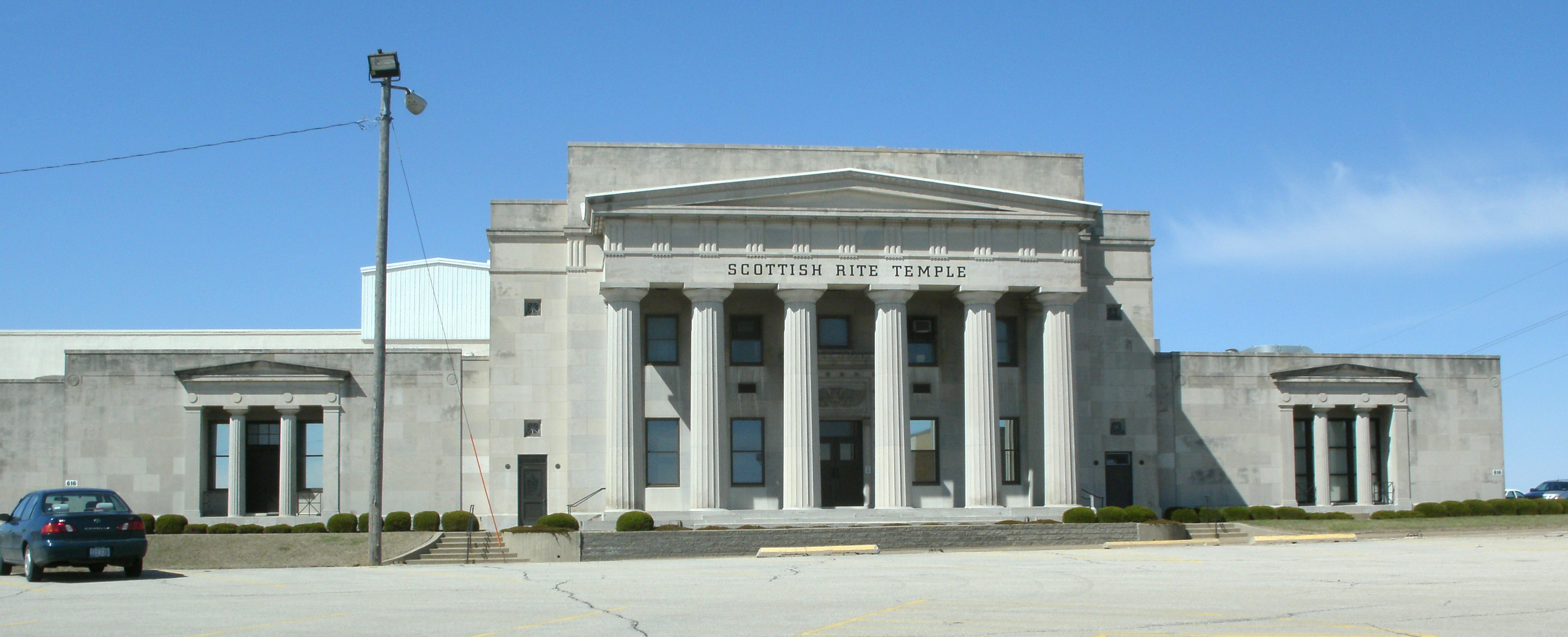
- Street view, March 28, 2011

- Location within Iowa Location within the United States
- Location: 616 "A" Ave. NE; Cedar Rapids, Iowa
- Coordinates: 41°58′58″N 91°39′52″W
- Area: 3 acres (1.2 ha)
- Built: 1927
- Built by: Loomis Bros.
- Architect: Henry Hornbostel
- Architectural style: Classical Revival
- NRHP reference No.: 98001327
- Added to NRHP: November 20, 1998

The Cedar Rapids Scottish Rite Temple, also known as the Scottish Rite Masonic Center, is a historic building located at 616 A Avenue, Cedar Rapids, Iowa. It is listed on the National Register of Historic Places (NRHP) as Consistory Building No. 2

Its 100th anniversary was celebrated by the Grand Lodge of Iowa as an event in 2010. The building's auditorium, dining facilities and kitchens can be rented by the public for weddings and other events.

The building is in the Classical Revival style, and was listed on the National Register in 1998. It was designed by noted Pennsylvania architect Henry Hornbostel and built by Loomis Bros. Construction in 1927. Loomis Bros. also built the NRHP-Listed Ausadie Building in Cedar Rapids.

It was built in 1927, attached to a 1910 building which is hidden from view from the front.
