= B Avenue NE Historic District =

Historic district in Iowa, United States

- U.S. National Register of Historic Places
- U.S. Historic district
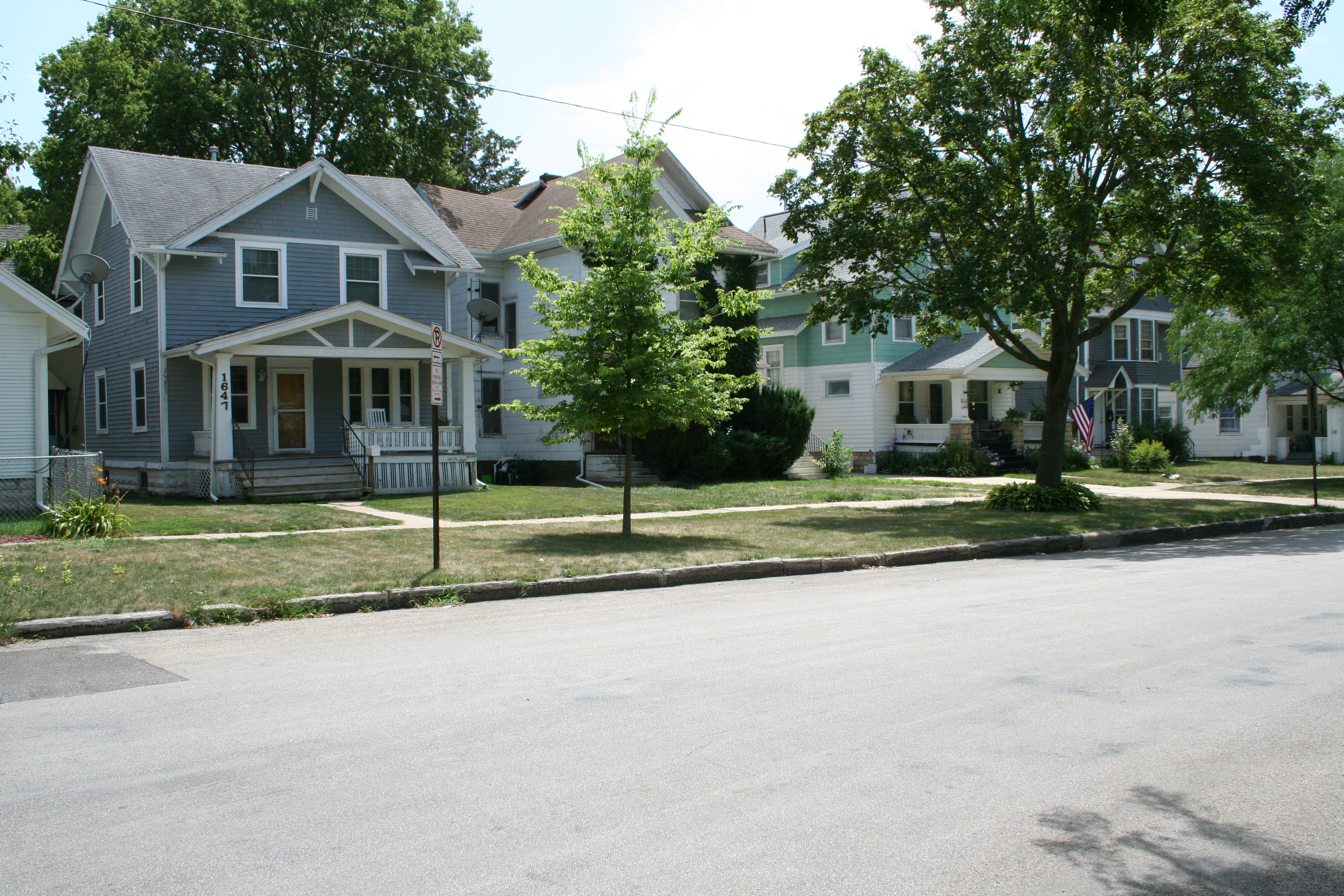

- Location within Iowa Location within the United States
- Location: Along B Avenue, NE, from 15th to 21st Streets, Cedar Rapids, Iowa
- Coordinates: 41°59′35″N 91°38′54″W
- Area: 45 acres (18 ha)
- Architect: Charles A. Dieman; William J. Brown
- Architectural style: Italianate; Bungalow/Craftsman
- NRHP reference No.: 13000692
- Added to NRHP: September 11, 2013

The B Avenue NE Historic District is a nationally recognized historic district located in Cedar Rapids, Iowa, United States. It was listed on the National Register of Historic Places in 2013. At the time of its nomination it consisted of 210 resources, which included 167 contributing buildings, and 43 non-contributing buildings. This is a working and middle-class neighborhood northeast of the campus of Coe College. It includes single-family dwellings, a church, and a school. The buildings are representative of various architectural styles and vernacular building forms popular from c. 1875 to 1963. The oldest house was built in 1873 and moved here in the early 20th century. Bungalow, Craftsman, and American Foursquare houses are dominant. A simple side-tower church, originally Central Park Presbyterian Church, was built in 1904. For the most part, architect-designed buildings are a rarity here. The houses are designs from pattern books. Cedar Rapids architect William J. Brown designed Benjamin Franklin Junior High School (1923).
