= G.B. Cooley House =

- G. B. Cooley House
- U.S. National Register of Historic Places
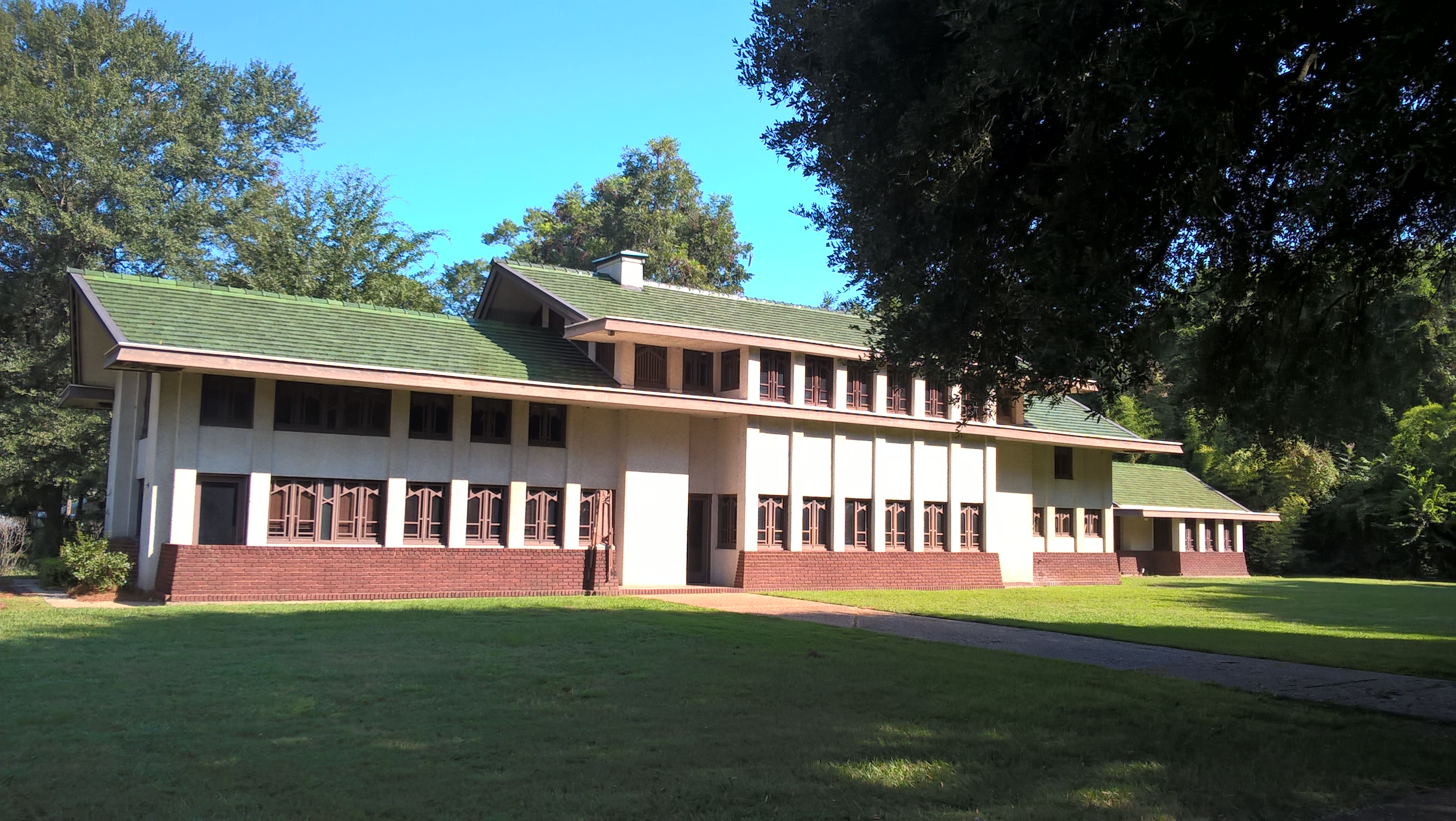

- Location within Louisiana
- Location: 1011 S. Grand St., Monroe, Louisiana
- Coordinates: 32°29′33″N 92°06′50″W
- Area: 0.5 acres (0.20 ha)
- Built: 1926
- Architectural style: Prairie School
- NRHP reference No.: 86001060
- Added to NRHP: May 15, 1986

G. B. Cooley House, a historic residence in Monroe, Louisiana, is a distinguished example of the Prairie School architectural style. Designed by Walter Burley Griffin, a contemporary of Frank Lloyd Wright, the house was completed in 1926 for entrepreneur Gilbert Brian ‘Captain’ Cooley.

== History ==
Originally designed in 1908, the house's construction was delayed until the mid-1920s. Cooley, known for his contributions to Monroe's civic and health sectors, was an entrepreneur who also played a significant role in battling the tuberculosis epidemic.

== Architecture ==
Embodying the Prairie School style, the Cooley House features a linear plan, casement windows with mullion patterns, and a distinctive sun porch. The design emphasizes horizontal lines and integrates with the natural surroundings. Interior elements include a mezzanine gallery and a "tent" ceiling in the living room, mirroring the roof's shape. The house was equipped with modern amenities for its time, such as a central vacuum system and steam heating.

== Restoration and current use ==
The Cooley House underwent restoration in 1985, preserving its architectural integrity. Acquired by the City of Monroe in 2008, the house is being restored by the Cooley House Foundation to serve as a public museum. This initiative reflects the community's commitment to preserving and celebrating its architectural heritage.
