= Bynum House =

- U.S. National Register of Historic Places
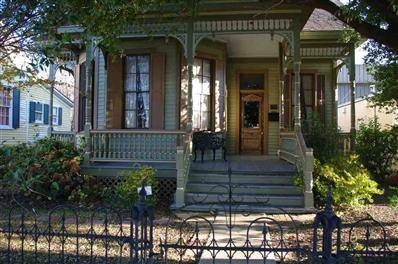

- Location within Louisiana
- Location: 604 Grammont St., Monroe, Louisiana
- Coordinates: 32°30′08″N 92°06′42″W
- Area: less than one acre
- Built: 1895
- Architectural style: Queen Anne, Stick/eastlake
- NRHP reference No.: 96001611
- Added to NRHP: January 25, 1997

Bynum House is a historic residence located in Monroe, Louisiana. Built around 1895, it combines Queen Anne and Eastlake architectural styles, showcasing detailed craftsmanship and design.

The house features a gable-end main block, overlapping gables with fishscale shingles, a prominent polygonal bay, and an L-shaped porch. Interior details reflect the era's intricate workmanship, with Eastlake-style turned columns, spindlework screens, and cutout sun ray designs.
