= Roland M. Filhiol House =

- U.S. National Register of Historic Places
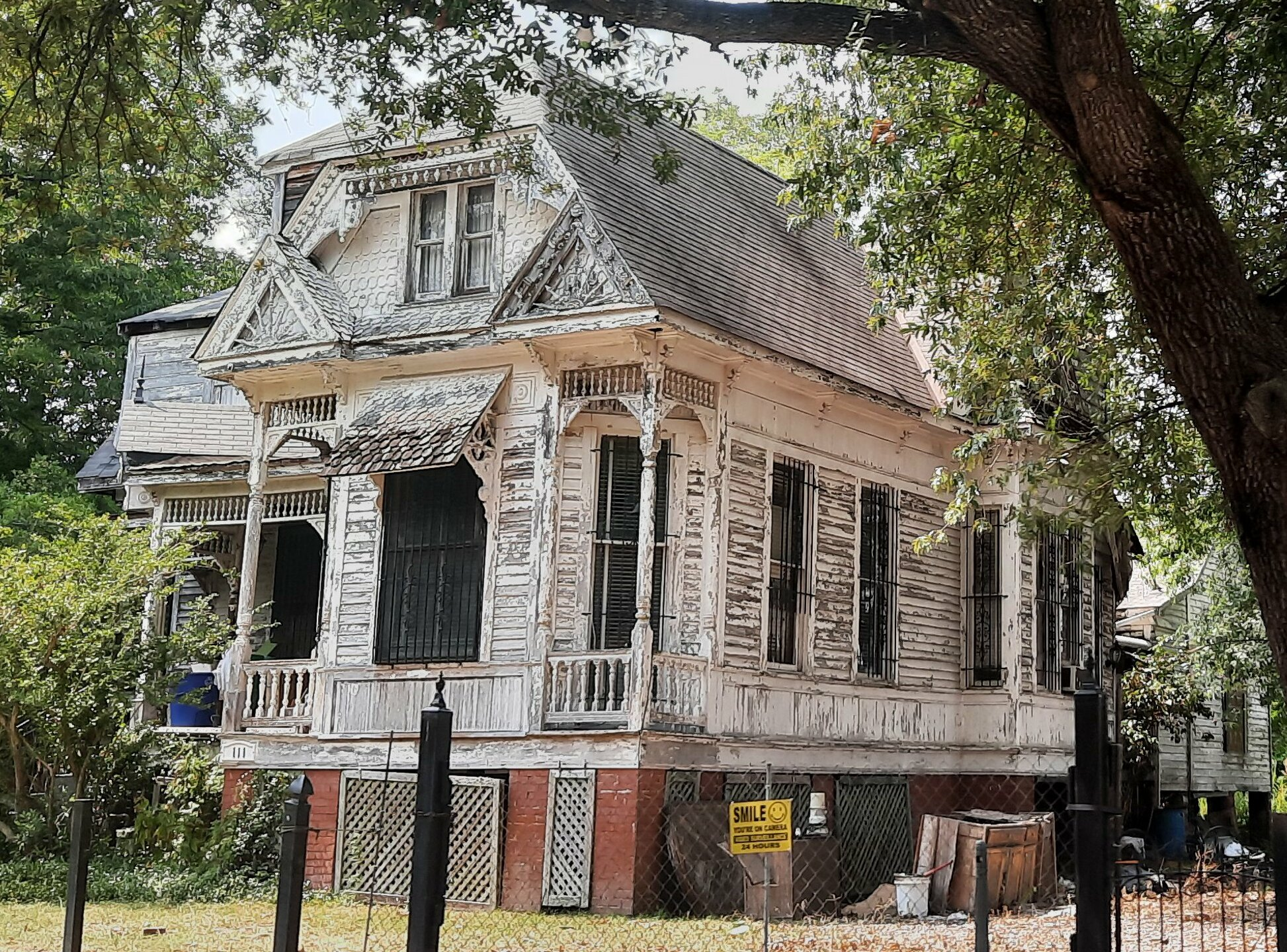
- The house in 2023.

- Location within Louisiana
- Location: 111 Stone Ave., Monroe, Louisiana
- Coordinates: 32°29′46″N 92°06′46″W
- Area: less than one acre
- Built: 1895
- Architectural style: Stick/eastlake, Queen Anne
- NRHP reference No.: 95000813
- Added to NRHP: July 7, 1995

The Roland M. Filhiol House, at 111 Stone Ave. in Monroe, Louisiana, was built in 1895. It was listed on the National Register of Historic Places in 1995.

== Background ==
The house is a one-and-a-half-story Queen Anne frame cottage with decorative Eastlake details inside and out.

The Stone Avenue house is named for Roland M. Filhiol, who had it built in 1895. He was the great-grandson Don Juan Filhiol, one of the founders of Monroe, Louisiana. Don Juan was the commander chosen to oversee the building of a Spanish post, Fort Miro, in the remote Ouachita District in 1791.

Roland Filhiol was a businessman and agriculturalist. He owned several plantations and lived in the home until 1906, three years before his death.The Edward M. Strong family bought the cottage from Filhiol and owned the Monroe home until 1948. The LaFrance family purchased the home and modified its attic to accommodate the numerous members of their family.

Gretchen LaFrance Hamel was the last of the LaFrance family to own the home. She sold the house to Larry Lockwood in February 2007. The Ouachita Parish Sheriffs Office took control of the deed in April 2023, with the house selling to John May on July 20, 2023.

== Photo Gallery ==
=== April 1995 ===
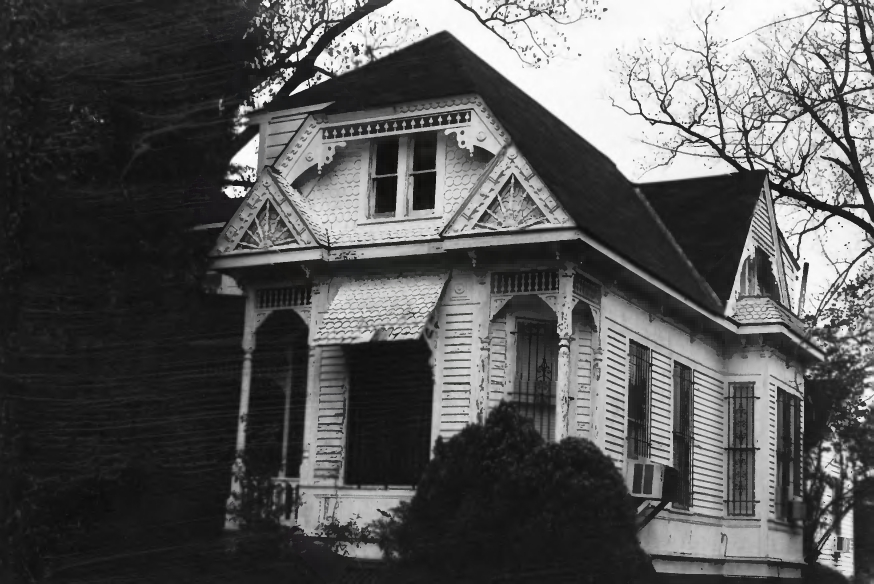
Right side view of the house

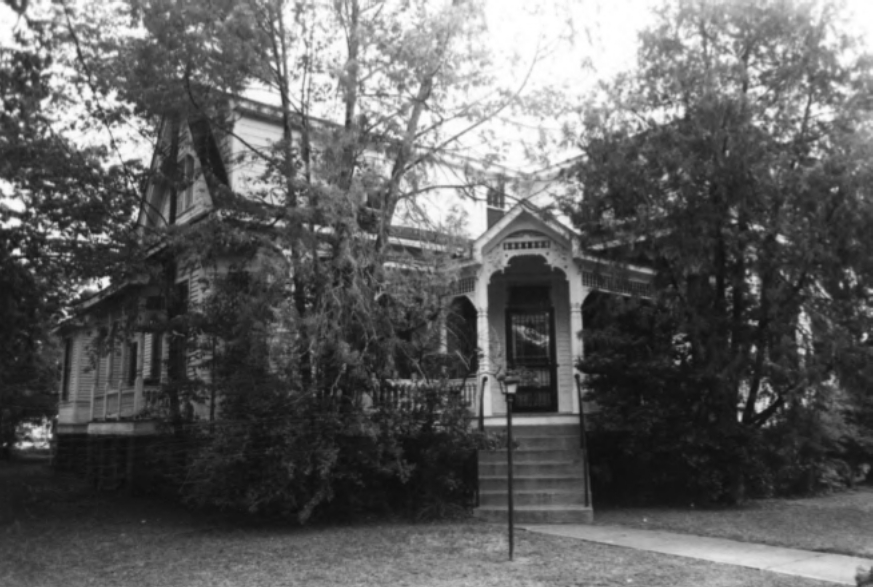
Front view of the house

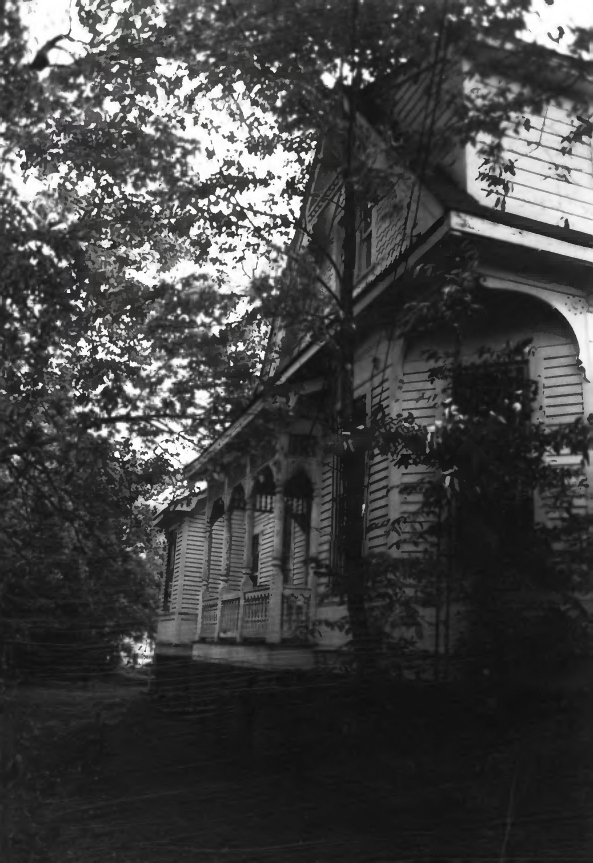
Left side view of the house

=== August 2023 ===
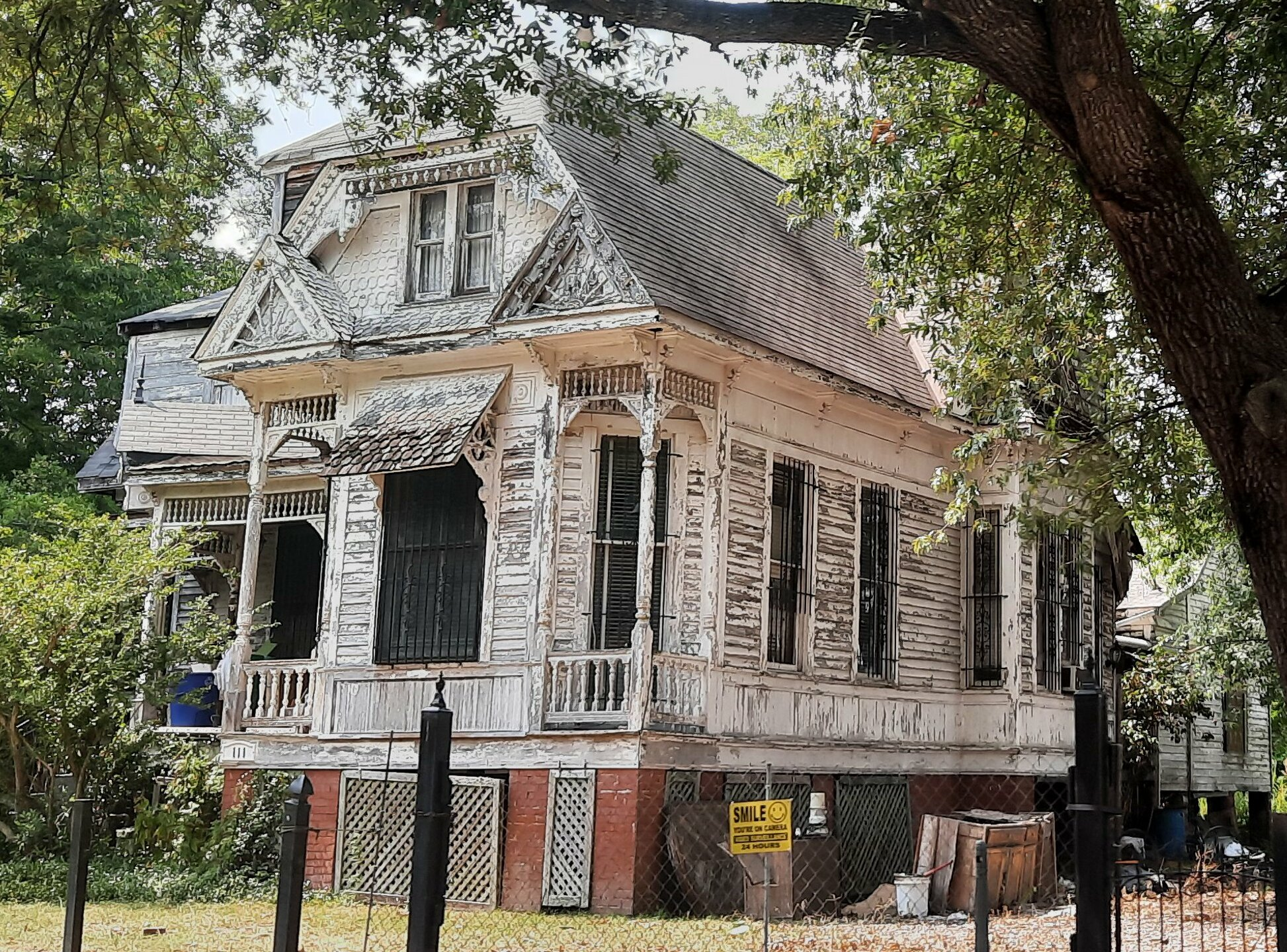
Right side view of house

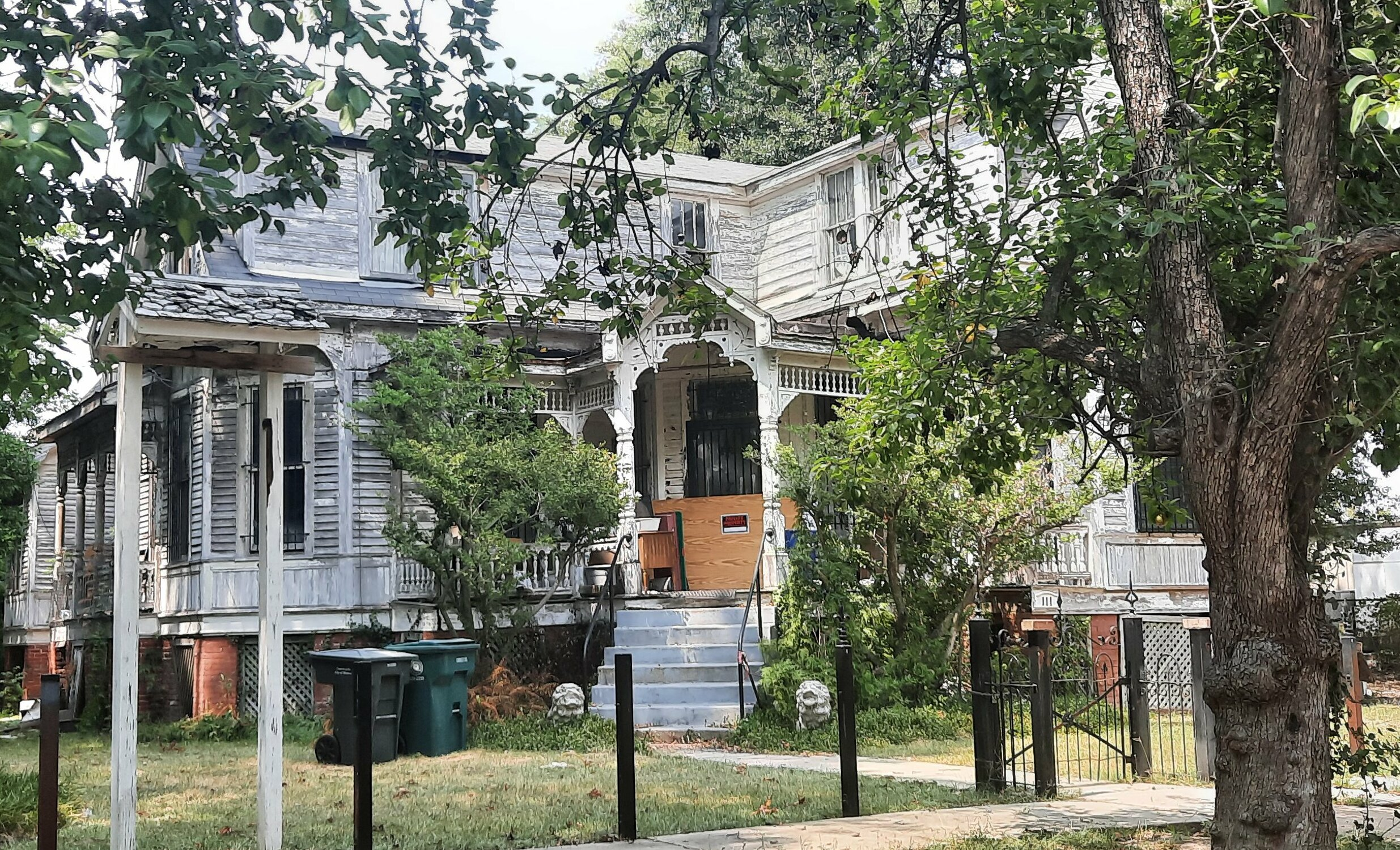
Front view of house

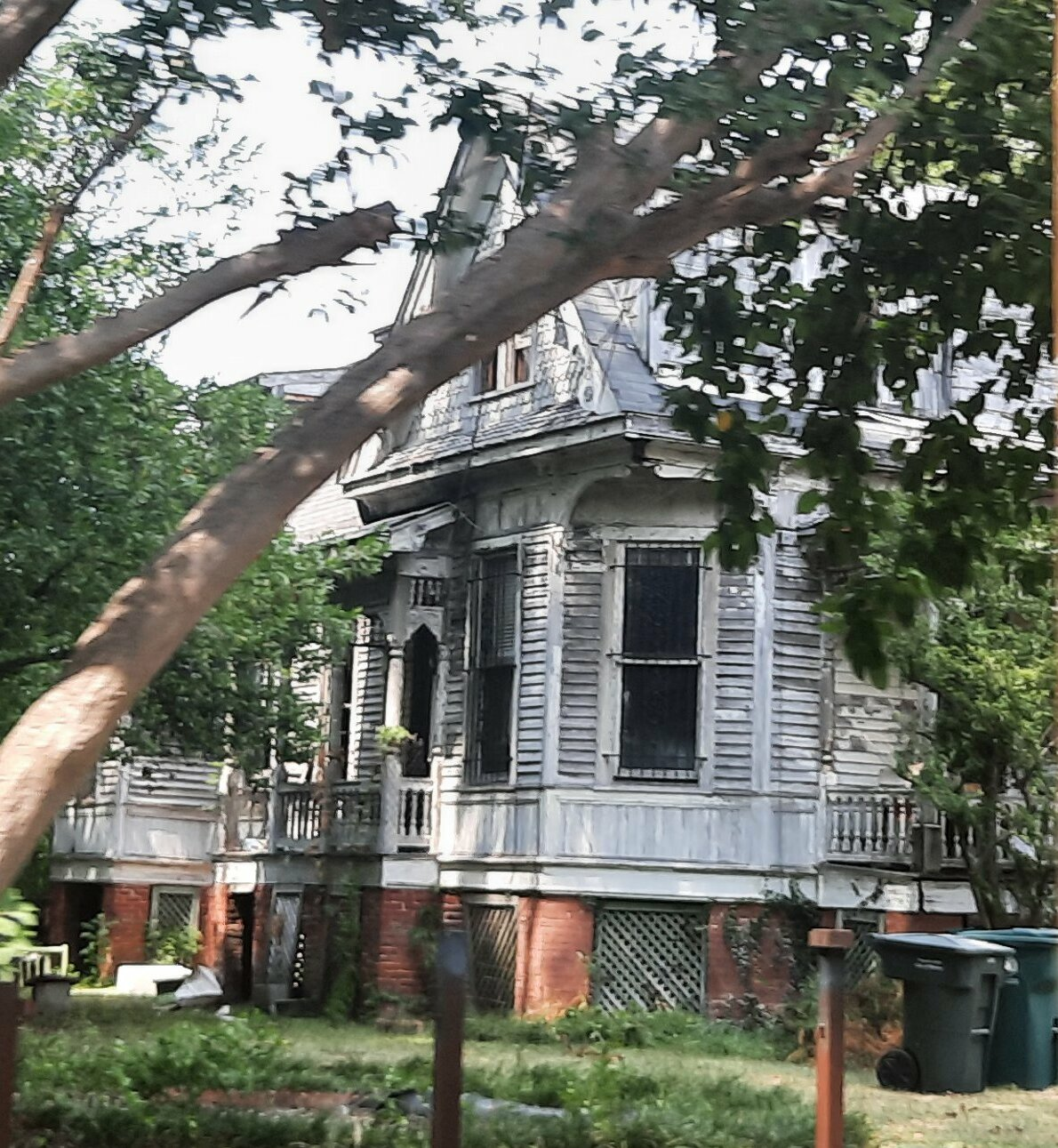
Left side view of house

== Resources ==
Registration form and photos submitted in April 1995 to put the Roland M. Filhiol House on the National Register of Historic Places
