= Monroe Elementary School Historic District =

Historic district in Iowa, United States

- Monroe Elementary School; Historic District
- U.S. National Register of Historic Places
- U.S. Historic district
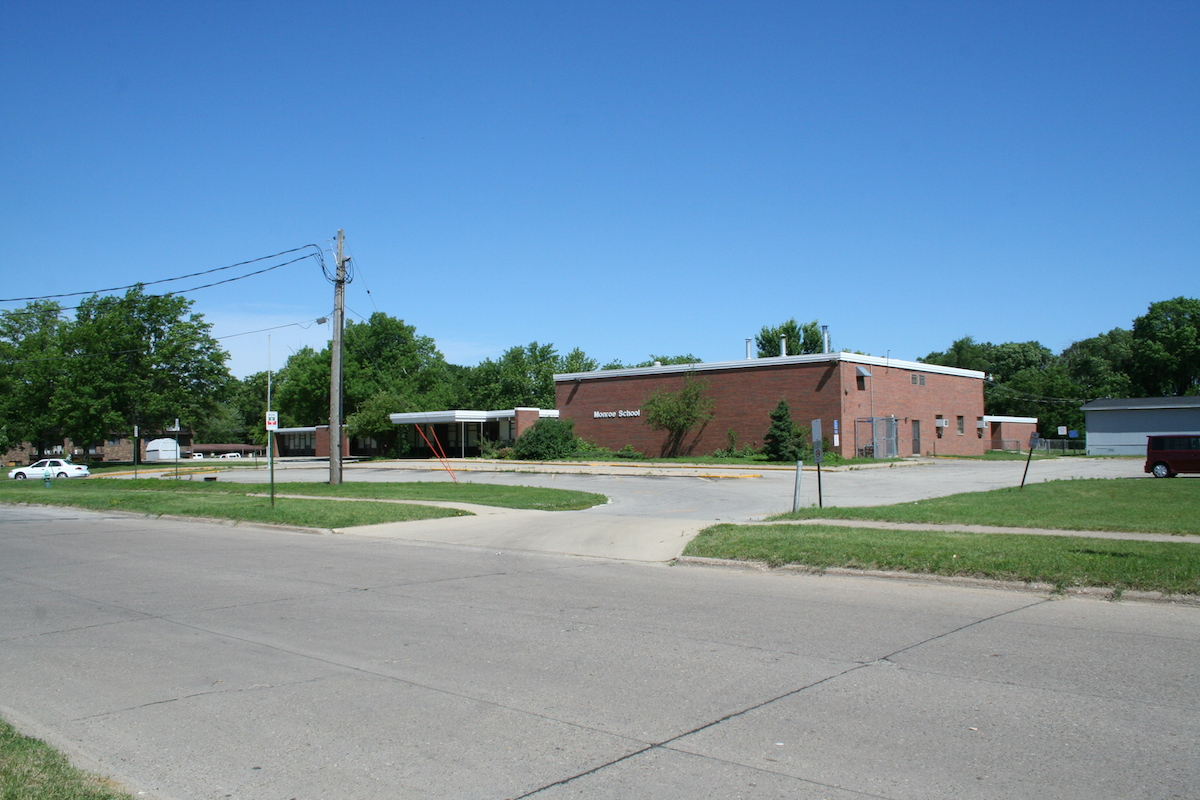

- Location within Iowa Location within the United States
- Location: 3200 Pioneer Ave., SE. Cedar Rapids, Iowa
- Coordinates: 41°58′10.9″N 91°37′11.6″W
- Area: 7.89 acres (3.19 ha)
- Built: 1961
- Architect: Brown & Healey
- Architectural style: Modern Movement
- NRHP reference No.: 15000751
- Added to NRHP: October 23, 2015

The Monroe Elementary School Historic District is a nationally recognized historic district located in Cedar Rapids, Iowa, United States. It was listed on the National Register of Historic Places in 2015. At the time of its nomination it consisted of 10 resources, which included one contributing building, one contributing site, three contributing objects, two non-contributing buildings, and three non-contributing objects. The school building was completed in 1961 in a neighborhood of small ranch-style houses from the same era. Designed by the Cedar Rapids architectural firm of Brown & Healey, it was one of seven schools built as a result of a bond referendum in 1959. It was necessitated by a roughly 70% increase in enrollment between 1950 and 1960. The single story, brick building features long and wide corridors, low ceiling heights, extensive use of glazing, exposed trusses, and deep overhangs. The building retains historical integrity, while the other school buildings built at this time in Cedar Rapids do not. Two basketball hoops and a fire engine-shaped piece of playground equipment are the contributing objects. The non-contributing buildings are two temporary classrooms, three pieces of playground equipment are the non-contributing objects. It ceased being a school building in 2011.
