= St. James United Methodist Church (Monroe, Louisiana) =

Historic church in Louisiana, United States

- Formerly listed on the U.S. National Register of Historic Places
- Location within Louisiana Location within the United States
- Location: 916 Adams St., Monroe, Louisiana
- Coordinates: 32°30′35″N 92°6′19″W
- Area: less than one acre
- Built: 1923
- Architectural style: Gothic Revival
- NRHP reference No.: 92001519

Significant dates
- Added to NRHP: October 29, 1992
- Removed from NRHP: March 31, 2015

St. James United Methodist Church is a historic Methodist church building at 916 Adams Street in Monroe, Louisiana.

It was built in 1923 in a Gothic Revival style and was added to the National Register of Historic Places in 1992.

== See also ==
- First United Methodist Church (West Monroe, Louisiana)
- National Register of Historic Places listings in Ouachita Parish, Louisiana
