= Bright-Lamkin-Easterling House =

- Bright--Lamkin--Easterling House
- U.S. National Register of Historic Places
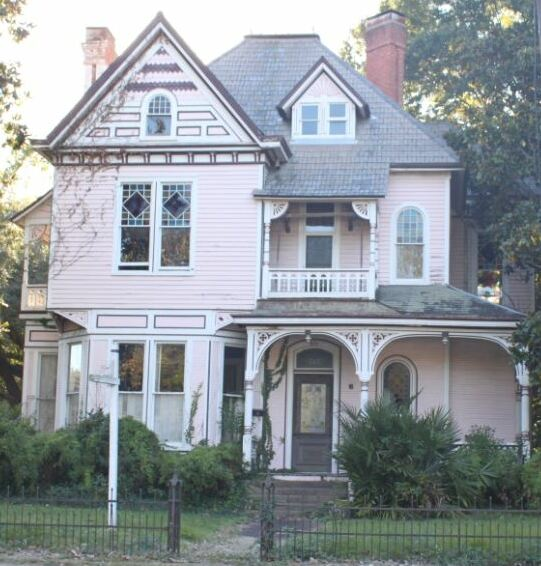

- Location within Louisiana
- Location: 918 Jackson St., Monroe, Louisiana
- Coordinates: 32°29′42″N 92°06′44″W
- Area: 0.8 acres (0.32 ha)
- Built: 1890
- Architect: William A. Bright
- Architectural style: Queen Anne revival
- NRHP reference No.: 86001063
- Added to NRHP: May 15, 1986

The Bright-Lamkin-Easterling House is a historic Queen Anne house in Monroe, Louisiana. It was built in 1890 by railroad tycoon William Bright.

== Background ==
The property was sold to William A. Bright by Melinda T. Layton. Bright owned The H.C. & A. Railroad before selling it to Jay Gould and settling down in Monroe, Louisiana where he built the Queen Anne house on Jackson Street for $7,000 ($235,146.92 in 2023 based on an average inflation rate of 2.68%).

Bright owned the two-story home until May 31, 1894, only four years. According to a deed for the residence, on December 6, 1898, E. Tyler Lamkin purchased the property, with his family retaining until the mid 1970s. Marguerite Lamkin Easterling was the owner of the house from May 13, 1927, to August 9, 1973.

The Bright-Lamkin-Easterling house was placed on the National Register of Historic Places on May 5, 1986, due to its Queen Anne revival and Eastlake movement style architecture. In 1986 the home was owned by William A. Hargiss and is now abandoned.
