= Lincoln Winebar =

- Interactive map of Lincoln Winebar

Restaurant information
- Location: 125 1st Street West, Mount Vernon, Iowa, 52314, United States
- Coordinates: 41°55′22″N 91°25′04″W

The Lincoln Winebar is a restaurant in Mount Vernon, Iowa. It was included in The New York Times's 2024 list of the 22 best pizzerias in the U.S.
