= Rev. R.W. and Fannie E. Keeler House =

Historic house in Iowa, United States

- U.S. National Register of Historic Places
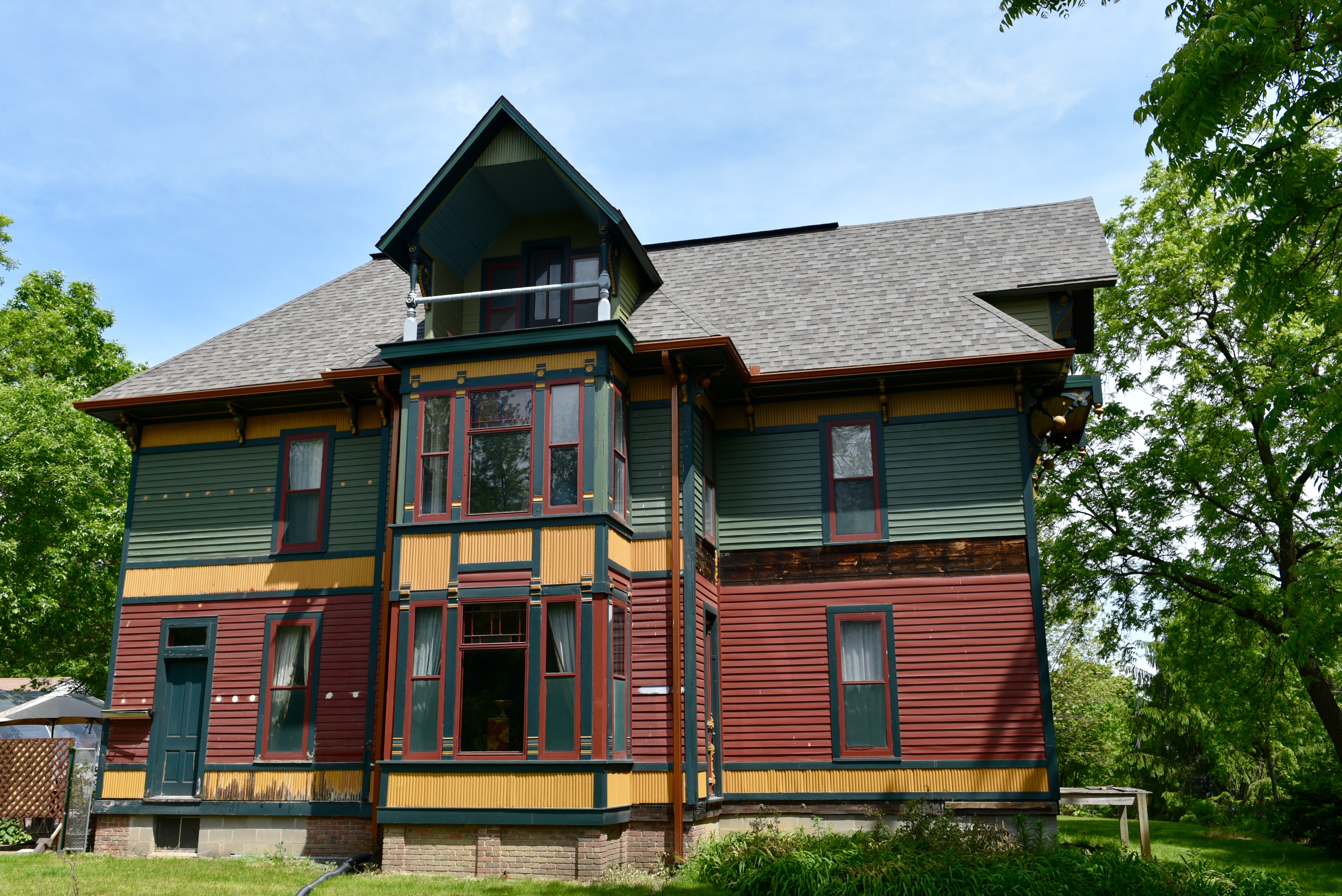

- Location within Iowa Location within the United States
- Location: 1430 10th St. Des Moines, Iowa
- Coordinates: 41°36′19.9″N 93°37′51.2″W
- Area: less than one acre
- Built: 1889
- Built by: Detwiler and Bedford
- Architectural style: Stick/Eastlake
- NRHP reference No.: 93001184
- Added to NRHP: November 4, 1993

The Rev. R.W. and Fannie E. Keeler House, also known as the Henry C. Borzo House, is a historic building located in Des Moines, Iowa, United States. The house is significant for its being one of the best examples in Des Moines of the attic balcony gable subtype of the Stick Style. It was built by local contractor-builder Detwiler and Bedford in 1889 as speculative housing. Most residential construction in Des Moines was in small developments between about 1880 and 1941, and this house was a part of one such development. This 2½-story frame structure shows its Stick Style influence with a hip and gabled roof, decorative trussed attic balconies that are supported by large decorative brackets, wide bracketed overhanging eaves, and wood clapboard walls with decorative patterns of horizontal boards. The property also contains a barn from the same time period, but it has been significantly altered over the years and now serves as a garage. The house was listed on the National Register of Historic Places in 1993.

The Reverend Richard W. Keeler was a Methodist minister who founded several congregations in Iowa. He was also the first president of Cornell College in Mount Vernon, Iowa. The New York native began his ministry there before moving west. He and his wife Fannie retired to this house in Des Moines to be near their children.
