= Salem Public Library =

Salem Public Library may refer to:

- Salem Public Library (Massachusetts)
- Salem Public Library (Oregon)
