= Bertram Bridge =

- Formerly listed on the U.S. National Register of Historic Places
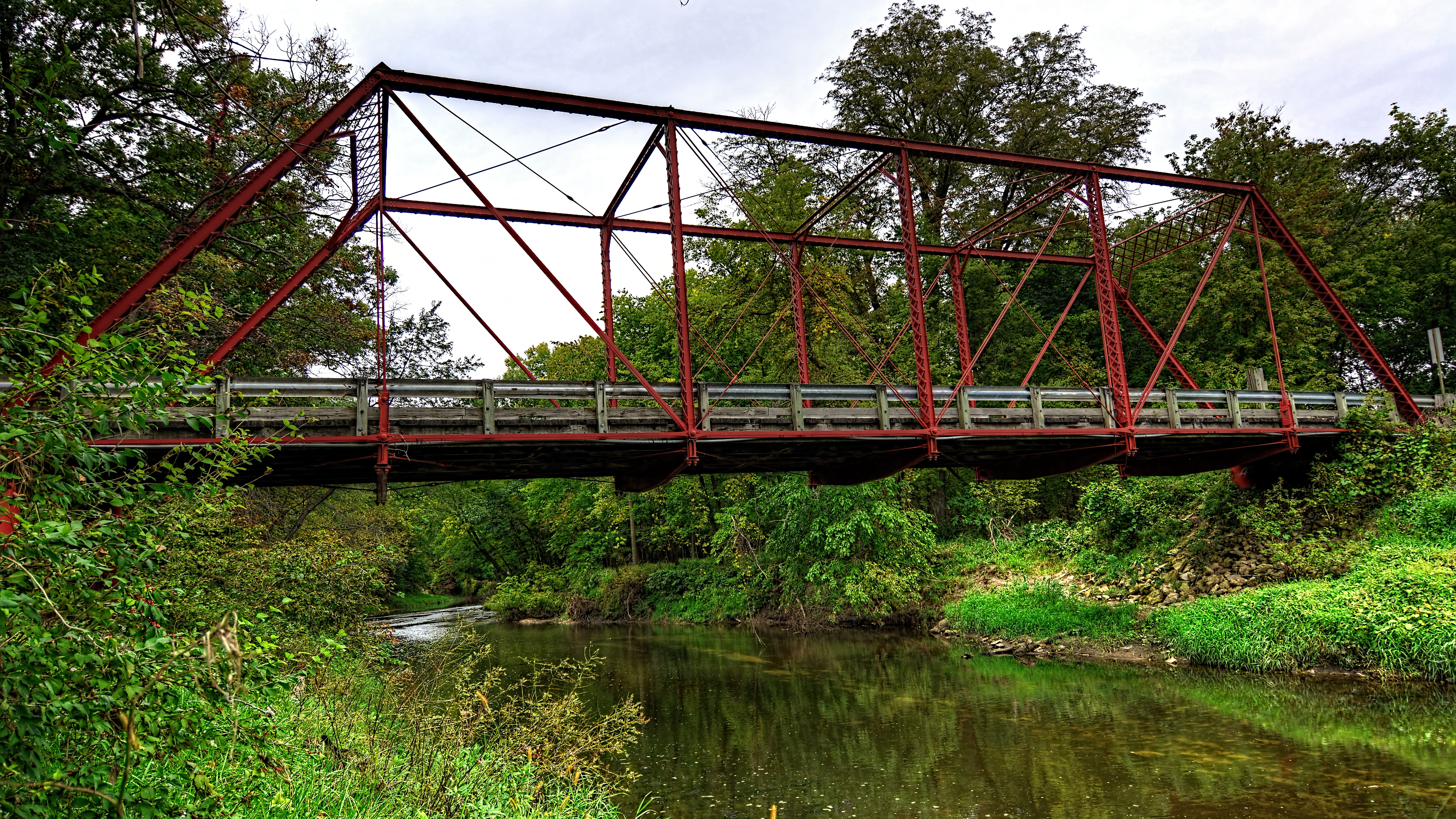

- Location within Iowa Location within the United States
- Location: Ely St. over Big Creek near Bertram, Iowa
- Coordinates: 41.9493511°N 91.5304986°W
- Built: 1891
- Architect: J.E. Jayne and Son
- MPS: Highway Bridges of Iowa MPS
- NRHP reference No.: 98000531

Significant dates
- Added to NRHP: May 15, 1998
- Removed from NRHP: December 8, 2014

The Bertram Bridge, also known as the Ely Street Bridge, was a historic structure located near the town of Bertram in rural Linn County, Iowa, United States. The metal 5-panel pinned Pratt through truss bridge was built in 1891. It was designed by the J.E. Jayne and Son Bridge Company of Iowa City. The bridge had two main spans and two approach spans. The whole structure was 208 feet (63 m) and the roadway was 13.5 feet (4 m) wide. The bridge was listed on the National Register of Historic Places in 1998 as a part of the Highway Bridges of Iowa MPS.

Bertram Bridge was destroyed by flood waters from Big Creek on June 29, 2014, and was removed from the National Register later that year.
