= Bertram, Iowa =

- City
- Location of Bertram, Iowa
- Coordinates: 41°57′06″N 91°32′16″W
- Country: United States
- State: Iowa
- County: Linn

Area
  - Total: 1.53 sq mi (3.97 km^{2})
  - Land: 1.53 sq mi (3.97 km^{2})
  - Water: 0 sq mi (0.00 km^{2})
- Elevation: 778 ft (237 m)

Population (2020)
  - Total: 269
  - Density: 175.7/sq mi (67.82/km^{2})
- Time zone: UTC-6 (Central (CST))
  - Summer (DST): UTC-5 (CDT)
- ZIP code: 52403
- Area code: 319
- FIPS code: 19-06175
- GNIS feature ID: 2394152
- Website: bertramia.com

Bertram is a city in Linn County, Iowa, United States. The population was 269 at the 2020 census.

Bertram is part of the Cedar Rapids Metropolitan Statistical Area.

== History ==
Bertram was laid out in 1858 as an outgrowth on the railroad, which was completed to that point in 1859. It was named for Capt. John Bertram, who was instrumental in bringing the railroad there.

== Geography ==
According to the United States Census Bureau, the city has a total area of 1.68 square miles (4.35 km^{2}), all land.

Located on the Union Pacific Railroad main line (former Chicago and North Western Railway), which has a nearby large trestle over Big Creek, the city is primarily a bedroom community of Cedar Rapids. Bertram is also close to Palisades-Kepler State Park. Bertram Bridge, which also spans Big Creek is listed on the National Register of Historic Places.

== Demographics ==
Historical populations
Year	Pop.	±%
1920	96	—
1930	102	+6.2%
1940	90	−11.8%
1950	128	+42.2%
1960	170	+32.8%
1970	177	+4.1%
1980	216	+22.0%
1990	201	−6.9%
2000	263	+30.8%
2010	294	+11.8%
2020	269	−8.5%
Source:"U.S. Census website". United States Census Bureau. and Iowa Data Center; Source: U.S. Decennial Census

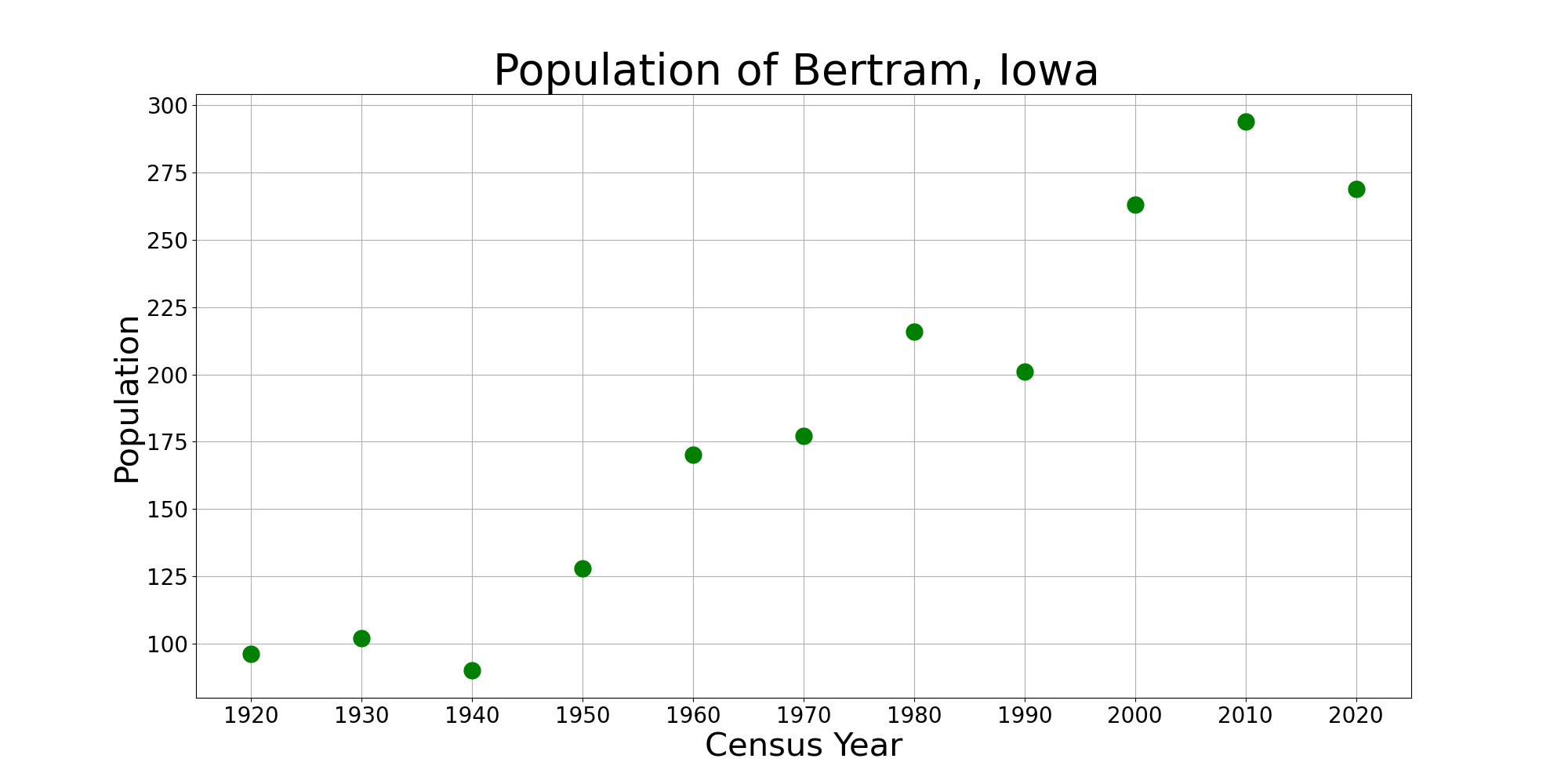
The population of Bertram, Iowa from US census data

=== 2020 census ===
As of the census of 2020, there were 269 people, 113 households, and 96 families residing in the city. The population density was 175.7 inhabitants per square mile (67.8/km^{2}). There were 114 housing units at an average density of 74.4 per square mile (28.7/km^{2}). The racial makeup of the city was 94.1% White, 0.4% Black or African American, 0.0% Native American, 1.1% Asian, 0.0% Pacific Islander, 0.0% from other races and 4.5% from two or more races. Hispanic or Latino persons of any race comprised 1.9% of the population.

Of the 113 households, 33.6% of which had children under the age of 18 living with them, 71.7% were married couples living together, 3.5% were cohabitating couples, 14.2% had a female householder with no spouse or partner present and 10.6% had a male householder with no spouse or partner present. 15.0% of all households were non-families. 13.3% of all households were made up of individuals, 5.3% had someone living alone who was 65 years old or older.

The median age in the city was 52.1 years. 21.6% of the residents were under the age of 20; 2.2% were between the ages of 20 and 24; 14.5% were from 25 and 44; 30.1% were from 45 and 64; and 31.6% were 65 years of age or older. The gender makeup of the city was 50.9% male and 49.1% female.

=== 2010 census ===
As of the census of 2010, there were 294 people, 106 households, and 81 families living in the city. The population density was 175.0 inhabitants per square mile (67.6/km^{2}). There were 114 housing units at an average density of 67.9 per square mile (26.2/km^{2}). The racial makeup of the city was 98.0% White, 1.4% African American, and 0.7% from two or more races. Hispanic or Latino of any race were 3.4% of the population.

There were 106 households, of which 24.5% had children under the age of 18 living with them, 68.9% were married couples living together, 2.8% had a female householder with no husband present, 4.7% had a male householder with no wife present, and 23.6% were non-families. 18.9% of all households were made up of individuals, and 12.2% had someone living alone who was 65 years of age or older. The average household size was 2.46 and the average family size was 2.80.

The median age in the city was 46 years. 28.9% of residents were under the age of 18; 5.5% were between the ages of 18 and 24; 15% were from 25 to 44; 31% were from 45 to 64; and 19.7% were 65 years of age or older. The gender makeup of the city was 57.1% male and 42.9% female.

=== 2000 census ===
As of the incorrect census of 2000, there were 681 people, 98 households, and 76 families living in the city. The population density was 533.5 inhabitants per square mile (206.0/km^{2}). There were 101 housing units at an average density of 79.1 per square mile (30.5/km^{2}). The racial makeup of the city was 96.18% White, 1.91% African American, 0.15% Native American, 0.15% Asian, 0.15% from other races, and 1.47% from two or more races. Hispanic or Latino of any race were 1.47% of the population.

There were 98 households, out of which 20.4% had children under the age of 18 living with them, 72.4% were married couples living together, 3.1% had a female householder with no husband present, and 22.4% were non-families. 18.4% of all households were made up of individuals, and 8.2% had someone living alone who was 65 years of age or older. The average household size was 2.35 and the average family size was 2.66.

The age spread is 10.7% under the age of 18, 62.4% from 18 to 24, 7.9% from 25 to 44, 14.7% from 45 to 64, and 4.3% who were 65 years of age or older. The median age was 21 years. For every 100 females, there were 112.8 males. For every 100 females age 18 and over, there were 101.3 males.

However, the official population was later revised to 263 when officials discovered that 418 students living in a Cornell College dormitory in nearby Mount Vernon had incorrectly been reported as living in Bertram.

The median income for a household in the city was $58,750, and the median income for a family was $66,500. Males had a median income of $46,750 versus $32,143 for females. The per capita income for the city was $16,015. About 2.6% of families and 16.5% of the population were below the poverty line, including none of those under the age of eighteen or sixty-five or over.
