= John Bertram (Massachusetts businessman) =

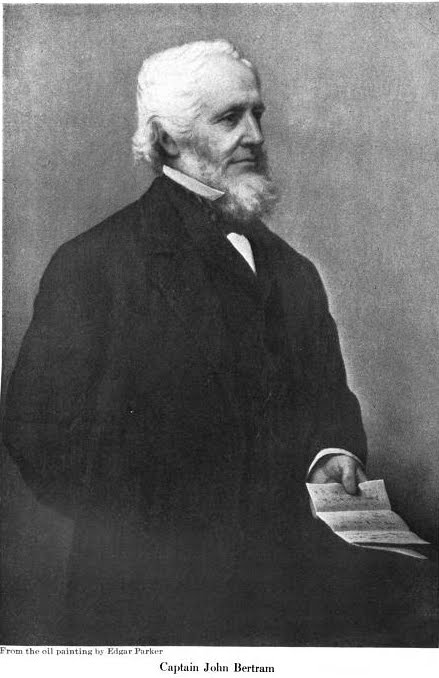
Captain John Bertram of Salem, Massachusetts

John Bertram (1795–1882) was a sea captain, businessman, and philanthropist in Salem, Massachusetts and namesake of Bertram, Iowa and John Bertram Hall at Bates College. He is also the founding donor of Salem Hospital and the Salem Home for Aged Men, now known as the John Bertram House.

== Early life ==
John Bertram was born on the Isle of Jersey in 1795. His parents, John Bertram and Mary Bertram (Perchard), brought Bertram to Salem as a child. Bertram was captured and imprisoned by the British during the War of 1812. In 1823 he married Mary G. Smith. His granddaughter was the philanthropist Caroline Emmerton.

== Career ==
Bertram's first job was a cabin boy and later a commander, ship owner and investor. He was extensively involved in shipping around the world including to Zanzibar, South America, and California and later he invested in railroads. He retired from actively commanding boats at age thirty-six. Later in life Bertram donated an "Old Men's Home," and helped to create Salem Hospital. John Bertram donated scholarship money to several Bates College students he met working at a hotel in New Hampshire, and his daughter Clara Bertram Kimball donated further funds to the college after his death, and Bates named a building "John Bertram Hall" in his honor. Bertram died in 1882.

Bertram's House is now the Salem Public Library and is located within the Salem Common Historic District (Salem, Massachusetts). Bertram is also the namesake of the John Bertram Athletic Field at Salem High School. Harvard University's Bertram Hall (Radcliffe College) is named after Bertram's grandson.

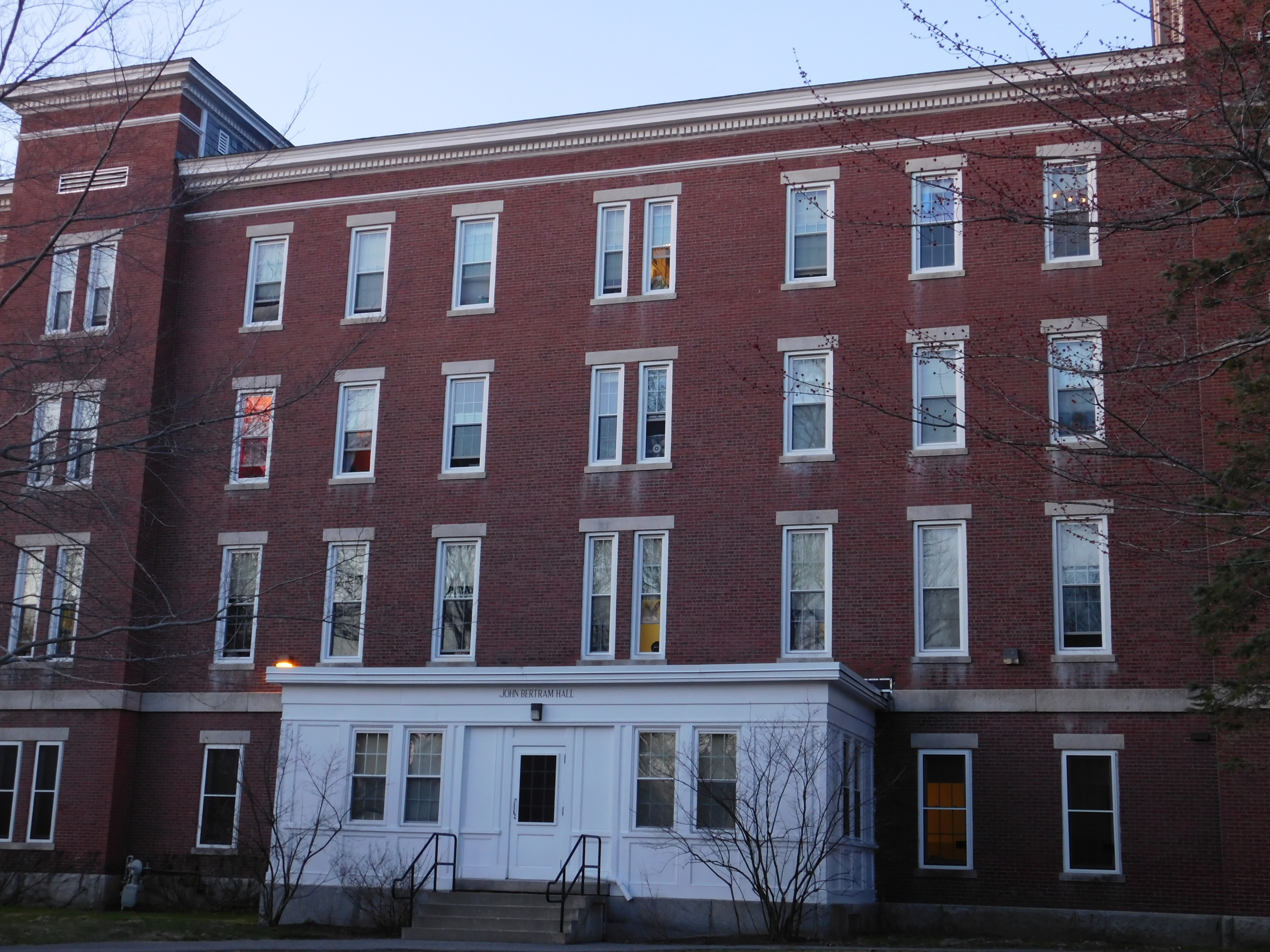
John Bertram Hall at Bates College

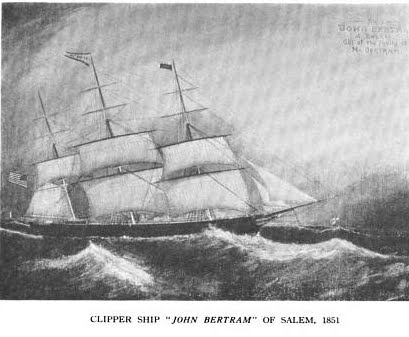
The "John Bertram" clipper ship

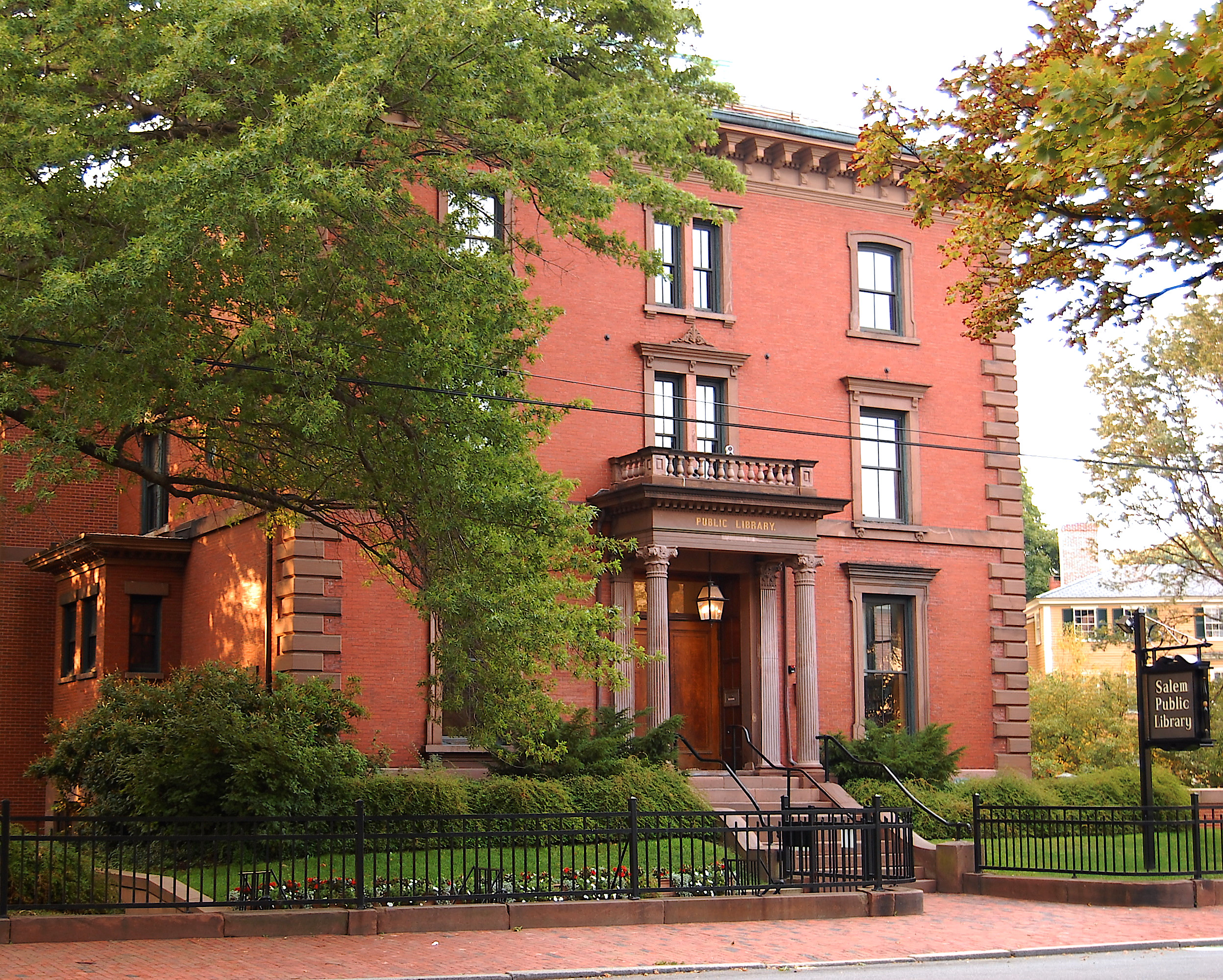
Salem Public Library, former house of John Bertram
