= Cabot House =

Residential House of Harvard College

- Residential House
- Harvard University
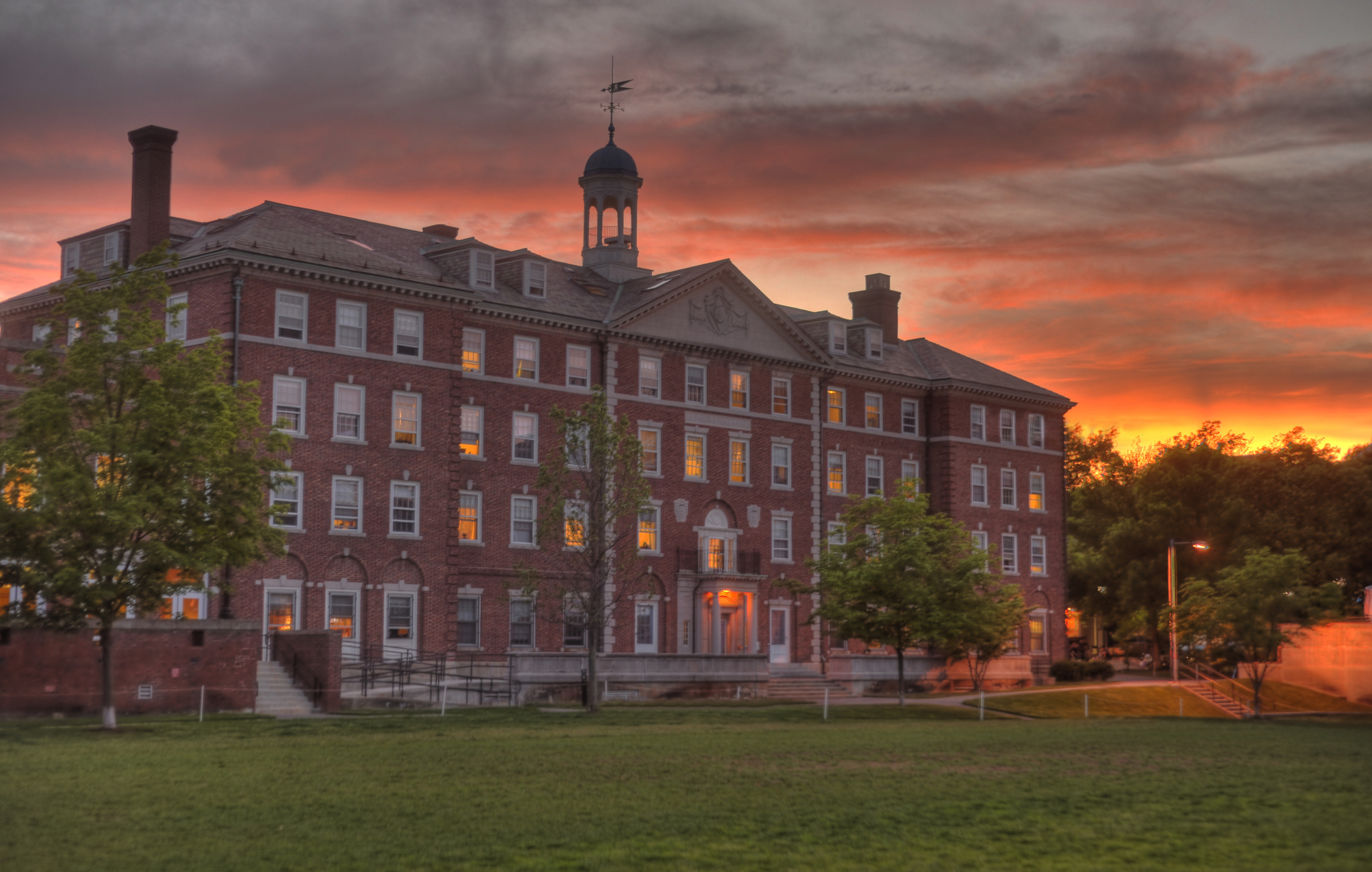
- Briggs Hall, Cabot House

- Shield
- Location: 60 Linnaean Street
- Coordinates: 42°22′53″N 71°07′27″W
- Full name: Thomas and Virginia Cabot House
- Latin name: Domus Capoceus
- Motto: Semper cor (Latin)
- Motto in English: Always heart
- Established: 1901
- Named for: Thomas and Virginia Cabot
- Former names: South House, East House
- Sister college: Trumbull College
- Freshman dorm: Wigglesworth Hall
- Faculty Deans: Ian Miller and Crate Herbert
- Dean: Ken Thomas
- HoCo chairs: Zay Gomez and Max Wagner
- Undergraduates: 376
- Tutors: 18
- Called: Cabotoix, Cabotians, Caboteers
- Website: cabot.harvard.edu

Cabot House is one of twelve undergraduate residential Houses at Harvard University. Cabot House derives from the merger in 1970 of Radcliffe College's South and East House, which took the name South House (also known as "SoHo"), until the name was changed and the House reincorporated in 1984 to honor Harvard benefactors Thomas Cabot and Virginia Cabot. The house is composed of six buildings surrounding Radcliffe Quadrangle; in order of construction, they are Bertram Hall (1901), Eliot Hall (1906), Whitman Hall (1911), Barnard Hall (1912), Briggs Hall (1923), and Cabot Hall (1937). All six of these structures were originally women-only Radcliffe College dormitories until they were integrated in 1970. Along with Currier House and Pforzheimer House, Cabot is part of the Radcliffe Quad.

As of March 2026, the Faculty Deans of Cabot House are Ian Miller and Crate Herbert. Prior Masters include then-Radcliffe President Mary Bunting and New Republic publisher Martin Peretz.

== History ==
=== Great experiment ===
In 1970, Harvard and Radcliffe began experimenting with co-educational housing. 150 Harvard students from the River Houses (including former Dean of Harvard College Benedict Gross) switched places with 150 Radcliffe students from the Quadrangle. Ten years later the experiment was taken to its logical conclusion, as the last all-male dorm, Straus Hall in Harvard Yard, went co-ed. Today, all Harvard dormitories, including the three Houses of the Quadrangle, house both men and women.

=== Birth of Cabot House ===
In 1961 Radcliffe College began to organize the brick buildings of the Radcliffe Quad into residential colleges in the style of Harvard. These Houses were styled North, South, and East, in reference to the cardinal directions of the building clusters.

Cabot House (originally named South House) was formed in 1970 when East House and the original South House were merged. Anna Maria Abernathy held the title of Head of House, and she and her husband Fred served as Cabot’s first House Masters (now Faculty Dean). In 1971, Mary Bunting, President of Radcliffe, began her tenure as House Master.

Bertram Hall, Radcliffe’s first permanent dormitory, was built in 1901 and donated by Mrs. David Pulsifer Kimball in memory of her son. In 1906, Eliot Hall, also donated by Mrs. Kimball, was built in honor of Grace Hopkinson Eliot, wife of Harvard President Charles W. Eliot. Alexander Wadsworth Longfellow, Jr, designed both Bertram and Eliot Halls. Barnard Hall was built in 1912 and named for Augusta Barnard and her husband. Briggs Hall, named for Radcliffe’s second president, LeBaron Russell Briggs, was constructed in 1923, and Cabot Hall, named in honor of Ella Lyman Cabot, a member of the Radcliffe Governing Board from 1902 to 1934, followed in 1937. The sixth building, Whitman Hall, was completed in 1911 and named for Sarah Wyman Whitman, the creator of two of the stained glass windows in Memorial Hall and a member of the Radcliffe Governing Board for several years. The Faculty Deans’ residence is located at 107 Walker Street. A residential wood-frame house at 103 Walker Street is the Senior Tutor’s residence.

While the outside of the brick dormitories has remained unchanged, renovations to the House 19 years ago and to the dining area in the summer of 2002 provide new facilities and newly configured suites more in line with the "vertical hallway" arrangements of the River dormitories.

=== Shield ===
The Cabot House shield was adopted when South House became Cabot House, in 1984. The shield is the coat of arms used by the Boston Brahmin Cabots after whom the House is named, though the shield is not their heraldic achievement; the coat of arms actually belongs to the French family Chabot, to whom the Boston Cabots have no relation.

Cabotoix have a unique affection for their shield, its red fish in particular. They are the inspiration for the common House cheer, "Go Fish!"—a play on the popular card game. Cabotoix feature their coat of arms on various apparel, including polo shirts, rugby shirts, and hooded sweatshirts. The standard coloration is used, or its inverse.

The House Office also has an antique copy of the Cabot Shield which had been hanging in the dining hall before the renovations. Oddly, this shield's colors are drastically different, although the shield still features the same general design and motto: the field is black and the perch are silver, and the crest is a white scallop shell. While the origin of this scheme is unknown, these colors are identical to those of Trumbull College, Cabot's sister college at Yale.

The standard arms are described heraldically as follows: Or, three chabots, haurient, gules. Crest: an escallop, or.

=== Motto ===
The Cabot family motto is 'Semper Cor,' meaning 'Always Heart'; this motto is shared by Cabot House.

=== Colors ===
The House colors, red and gold, are derived from the House shield; black, one of Radcliffe's colors, is an unofficial color, featured in much House apparel.

== Faculty deans, resident dean, and tutors ==
As of March 2026, the Cabot Faculty Deans are Ian Miller and Crate Herbert. Miller is a professor of History and Herbert is the Vice President for Institutional Advancement at Wentworth Institute of Technology.

Previous Faculty Deans (then known as House Masters) have included Rakesh Khurana and Rulan Chao Pian.

Allston Burr Resident Dean Ken Thomas began serving as Resident Dean in 2021.

Resident Tutors are academicians and/or professionals who live in the House and provide academic, career and life guidance to House residents while undertaking further studies, research and professional ventures. Resident Tutors at Cabot House have included Tyler Goodspeed.

== Constituent halls ==
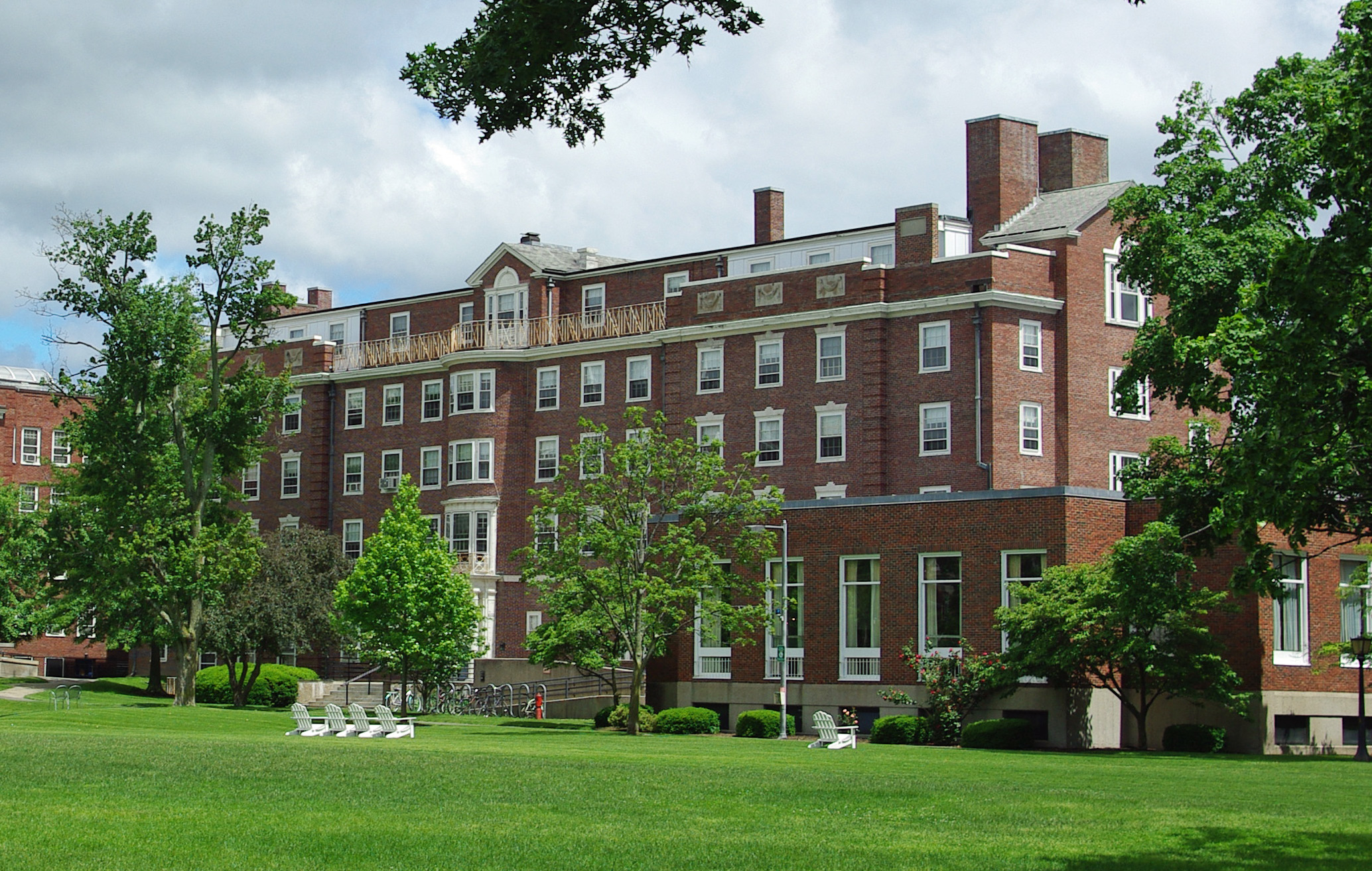
Cabot Hall

Cabot House has the following six halls:

- Cabot Hall
- Whitman Hall
- Briggs Hall
- Barnard Hall
- Bertram Hall
- Eliot Hall

Cabot, Whitman, Briggs and Barnard are connected by a series of tunnels in the basement. The Dining Hall, JCR, and Grand Entry also serve to connect these buildings above ground. Bertram and Eliot Halls, the oldest, are not connected to the rest of the house, but are a short distance away, co-located on the Radcliffe Quadrangle. The Faculty Deans' Residence and Resident Dean's Residence, 107 and 103 Walker Street, respectively, are located directly across the street from the rest of the house, and are the only such residences in the Harvard House system not to be physically connected to the rest of the house.

== Notable alumni ==
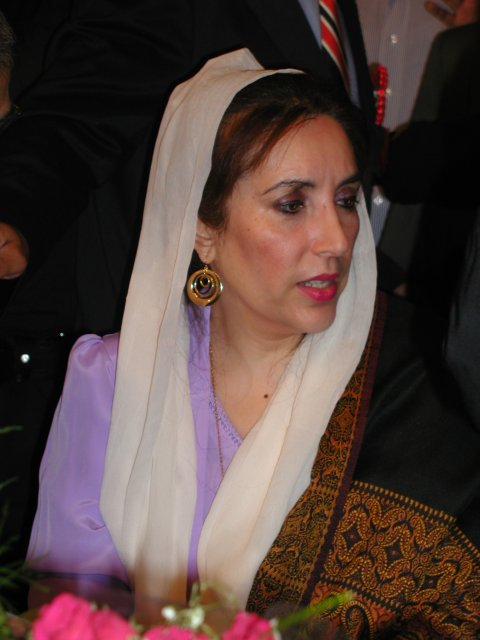
Benazir Bhutto, Prime Minister of Pakistan

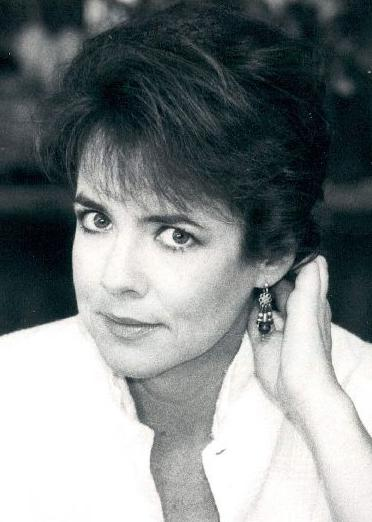
Stockard Channing, actress

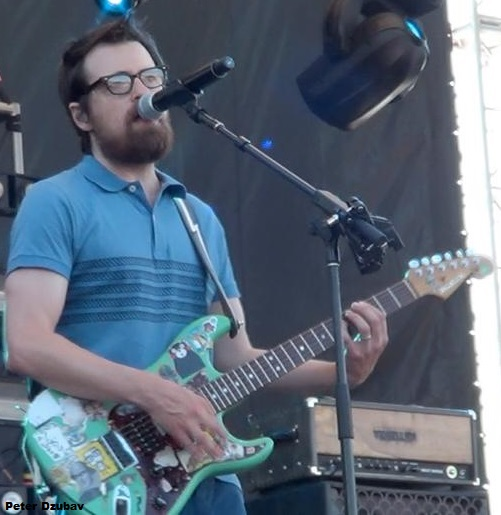
Rivers Cuomo, musician

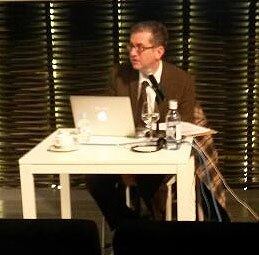
Greg Daniels, screenwriter

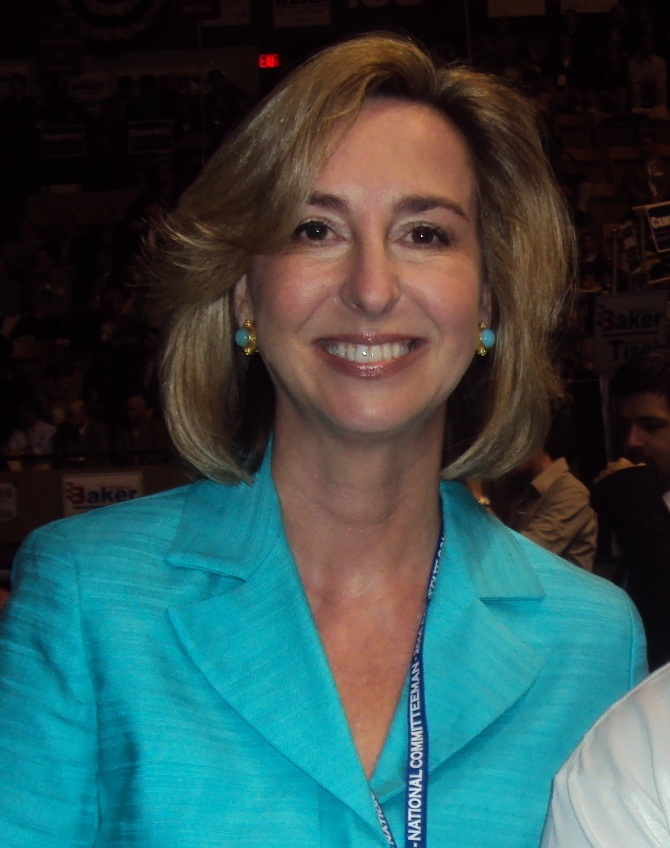
Kerry Healy, Lieutenant Governor of Massachusetts

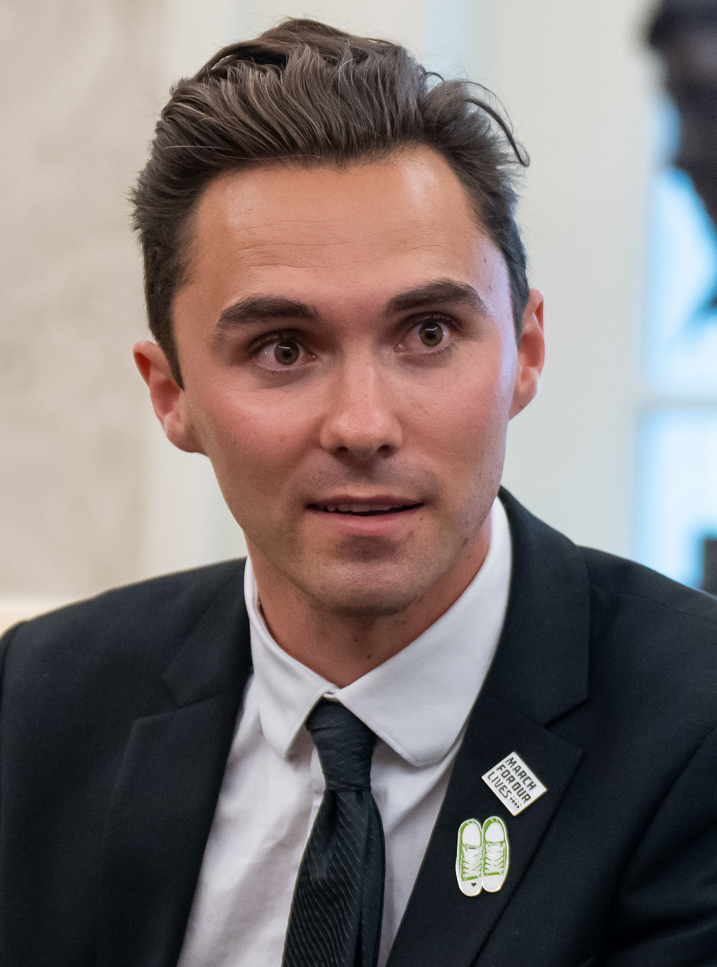
David Hogg, political activist

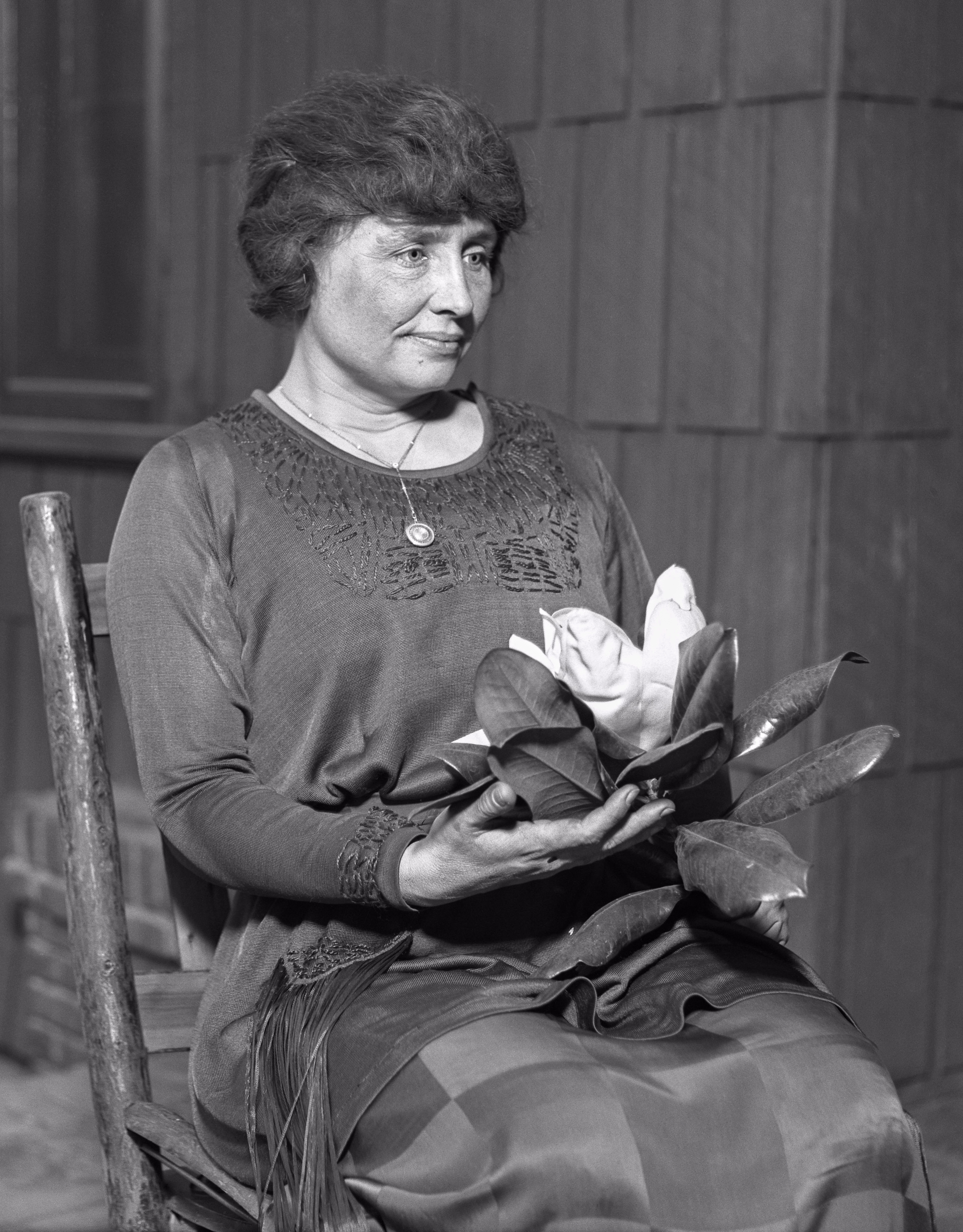
Helen Keller (South House), author and political activist

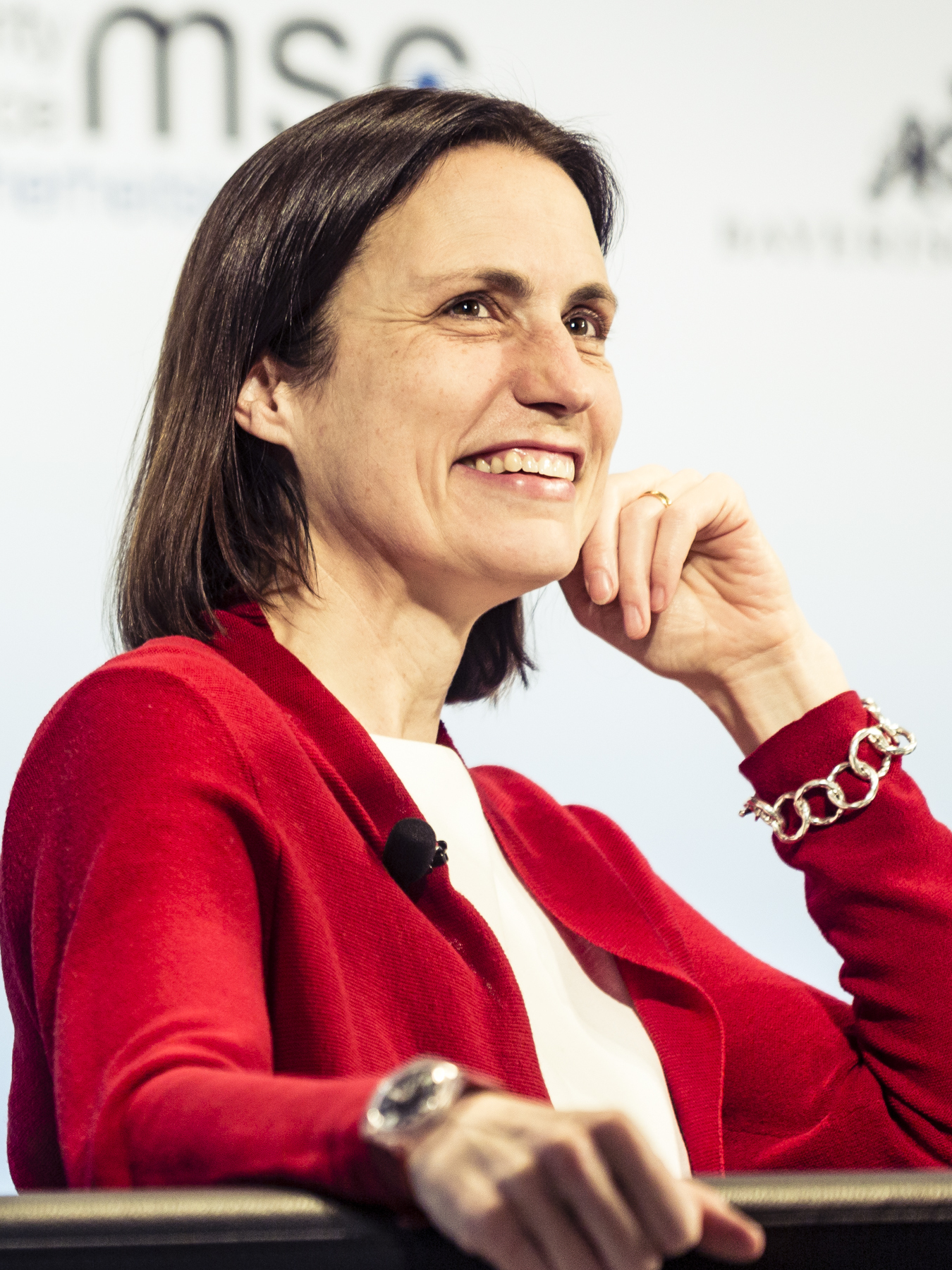
Fiona Hill, Russian advisor in Trump administration

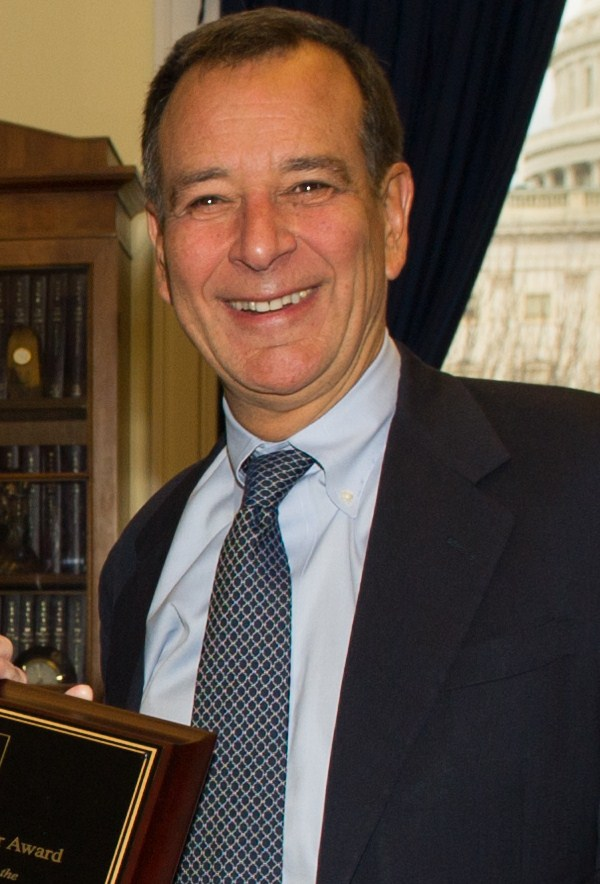
Jim Koch, Co-Founder of Boston Beer Company

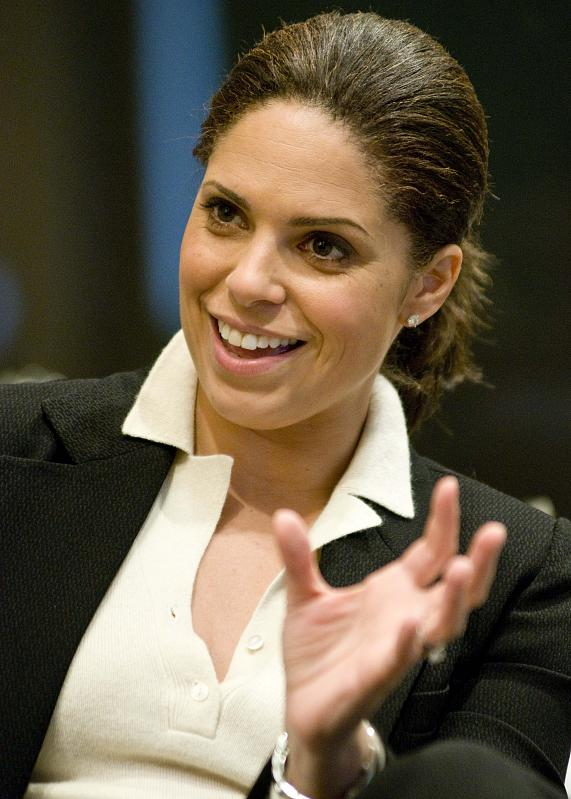
Soledad O'Brien, journalist

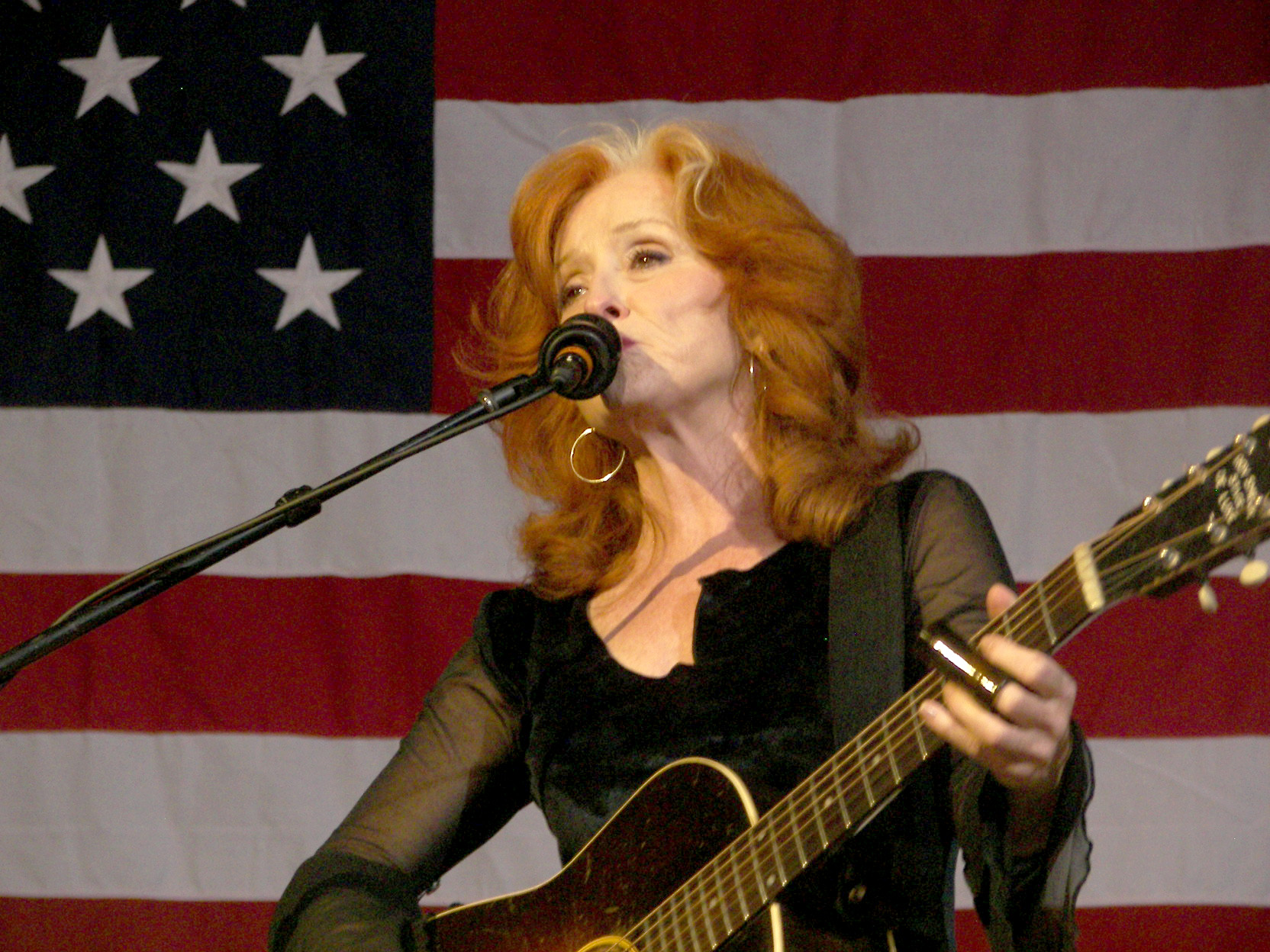
Bonnie Raitt, singer-songwriter

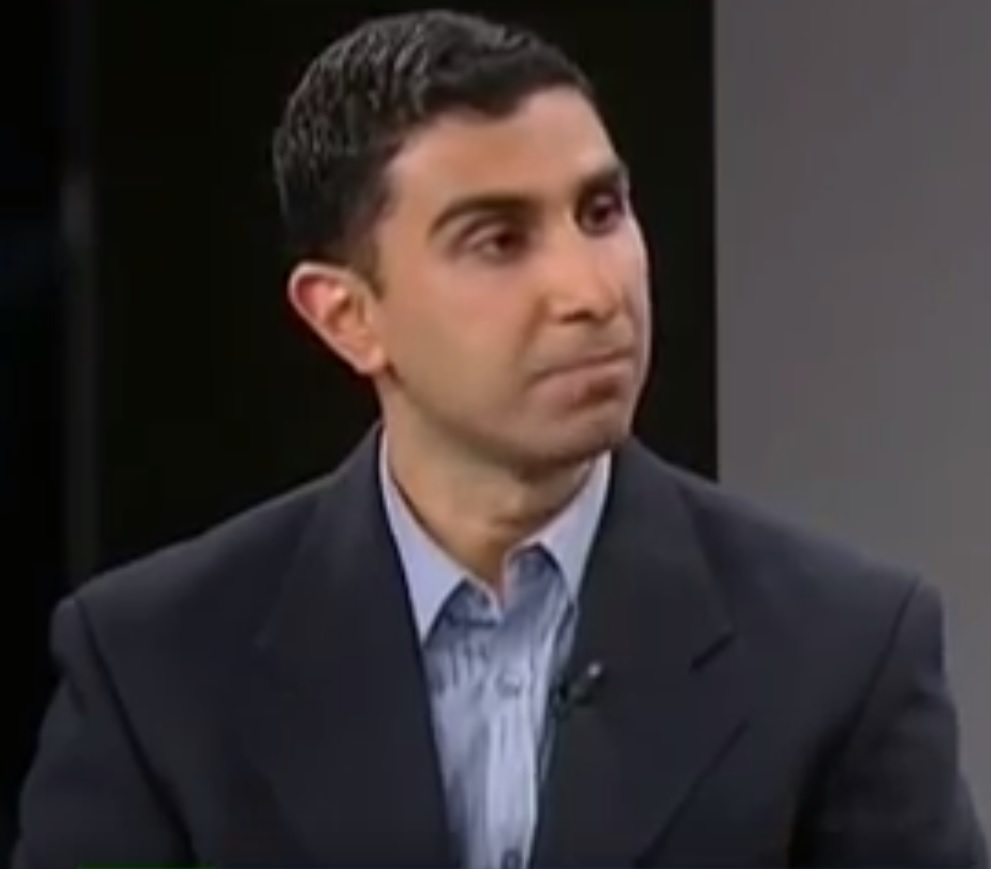
Faiz Shakir, political operative

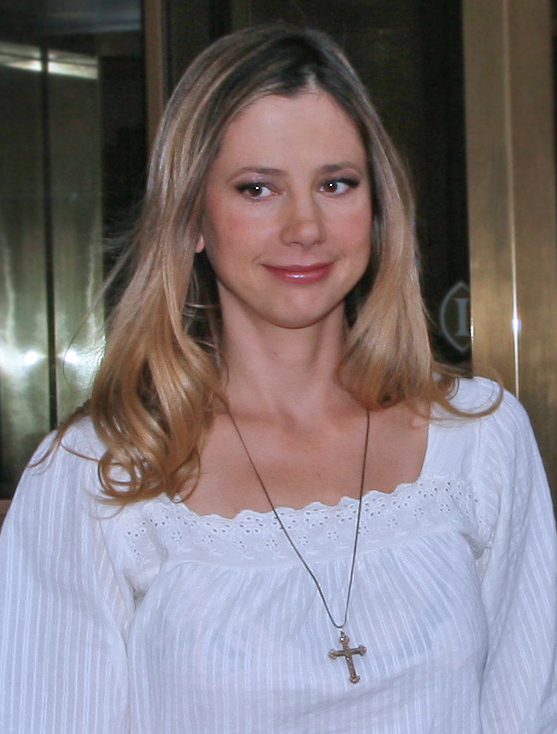
Mira Sorvino, actress

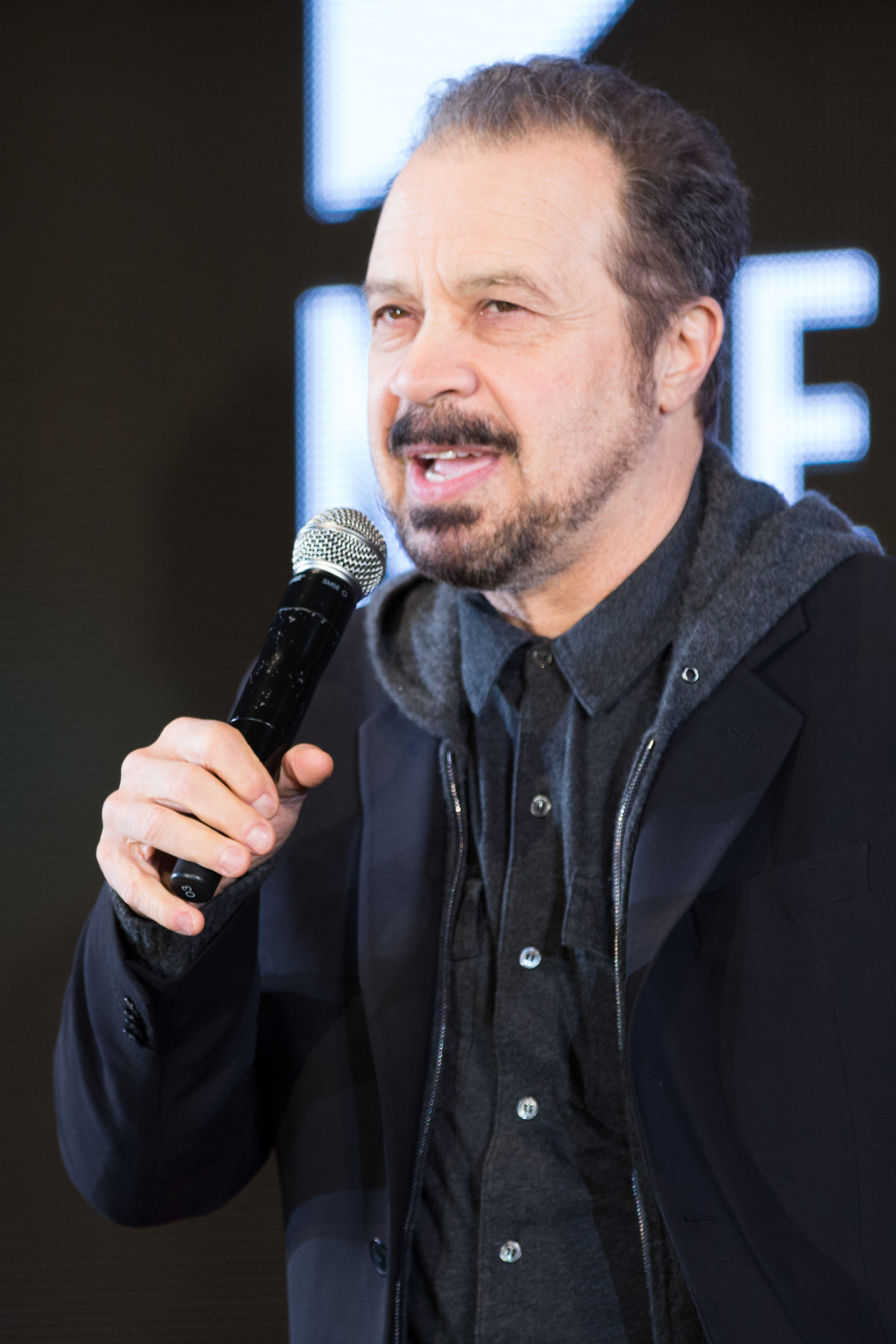
Edward Zwick, film producer

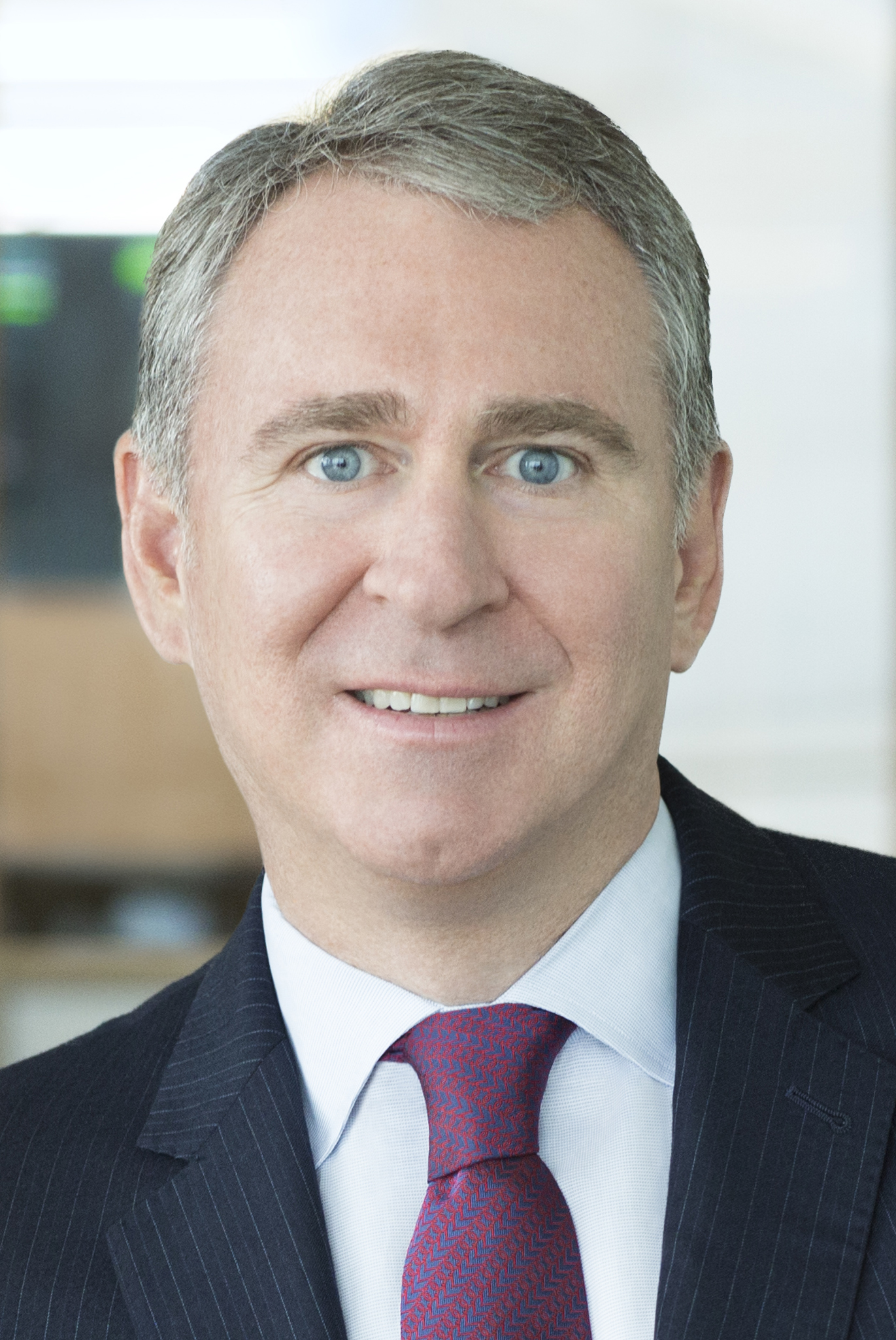
Kenneth C. Griffin, founder of Citadel LLC

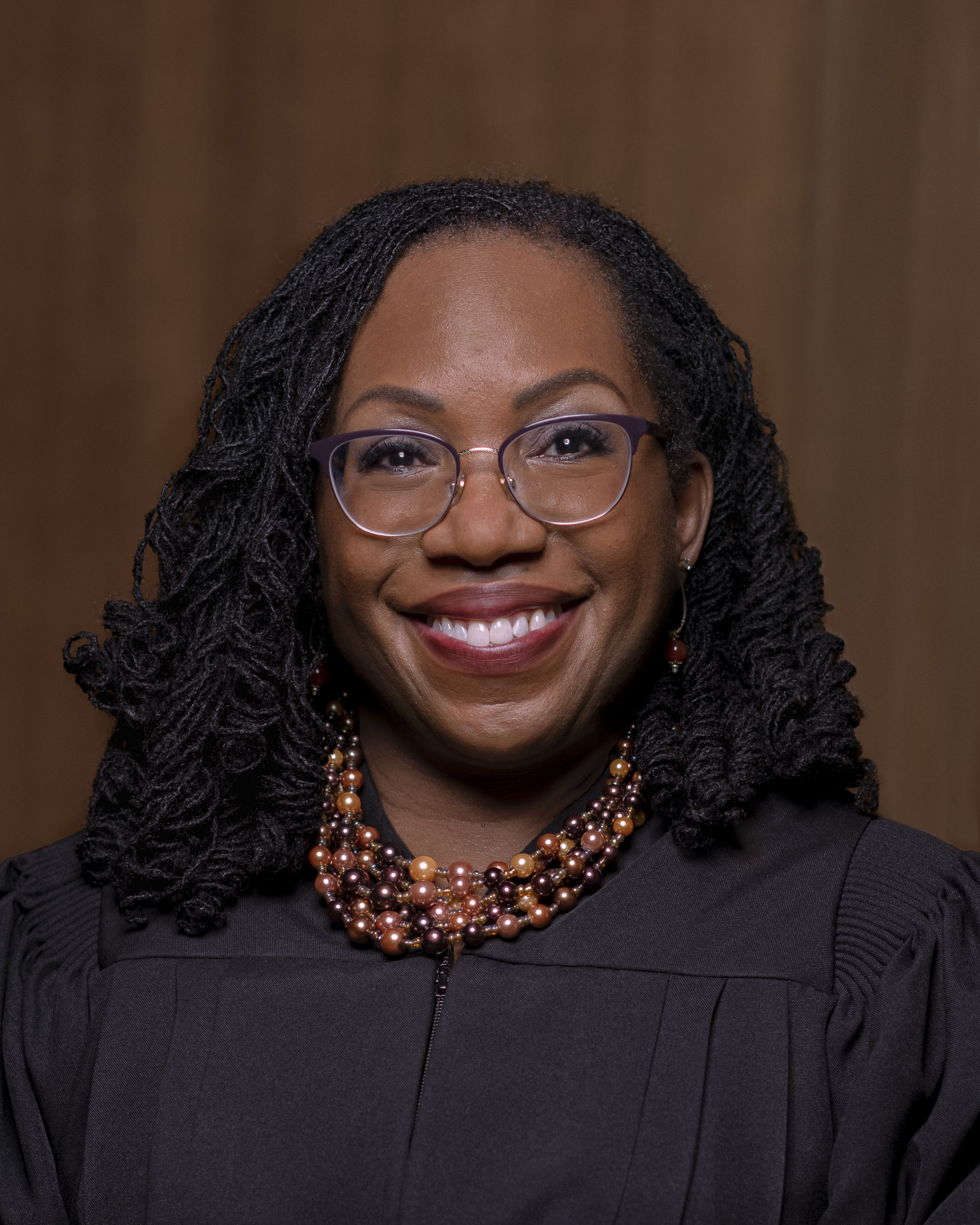
Ketanji Brown Jackson, Associate Justice of the United States Supreme Court

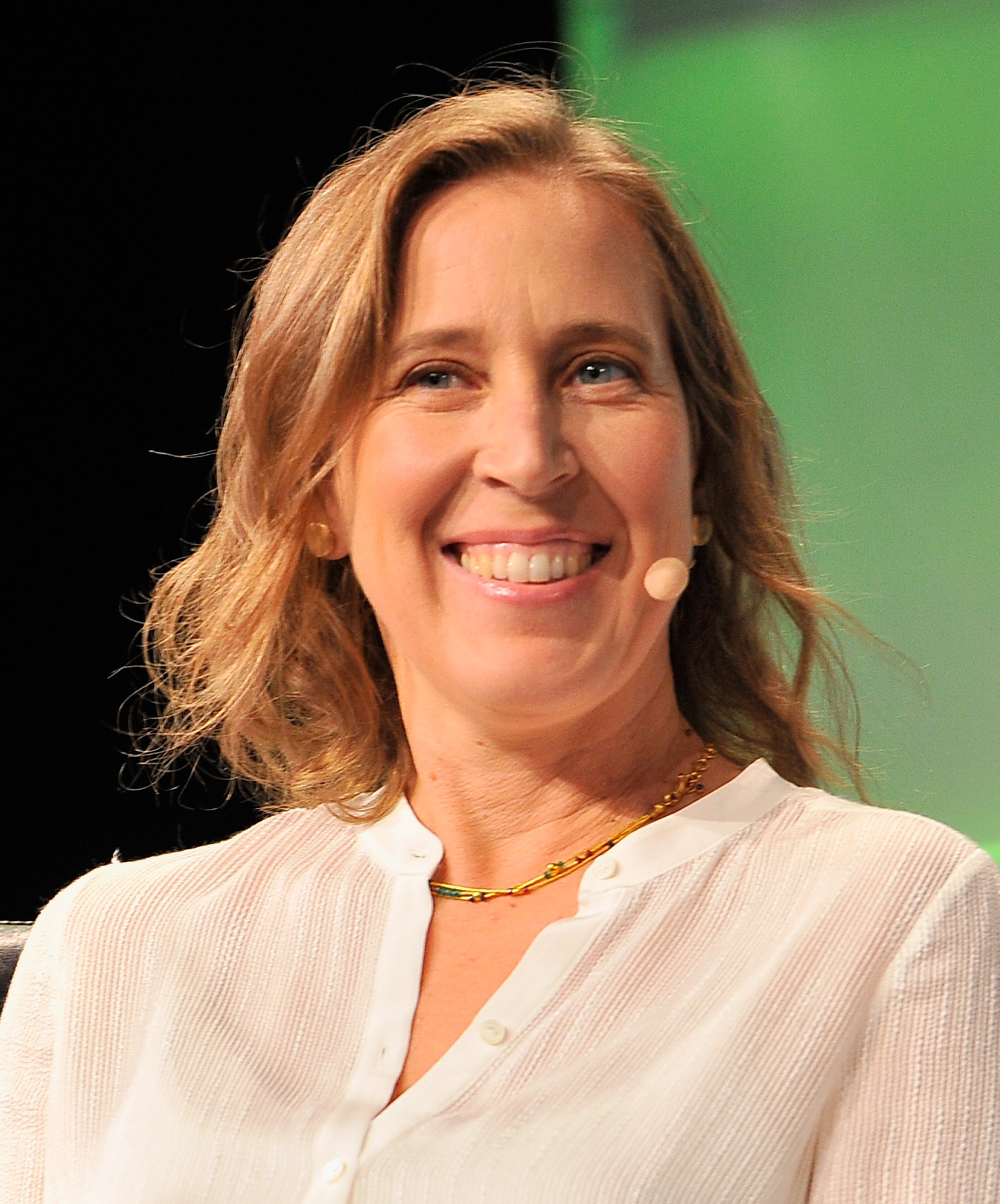
Susan Wojcicki
- Lindsay Crouse, actress
- Ellen Goodman, journalist
- Graeme Wood, journalist
