= Bertram Hall (Radcliffe College) =

Historic place in Massachusetts, United States

- Bertram Hall at Radcliffe College
- U.S. National Register of Historic Places
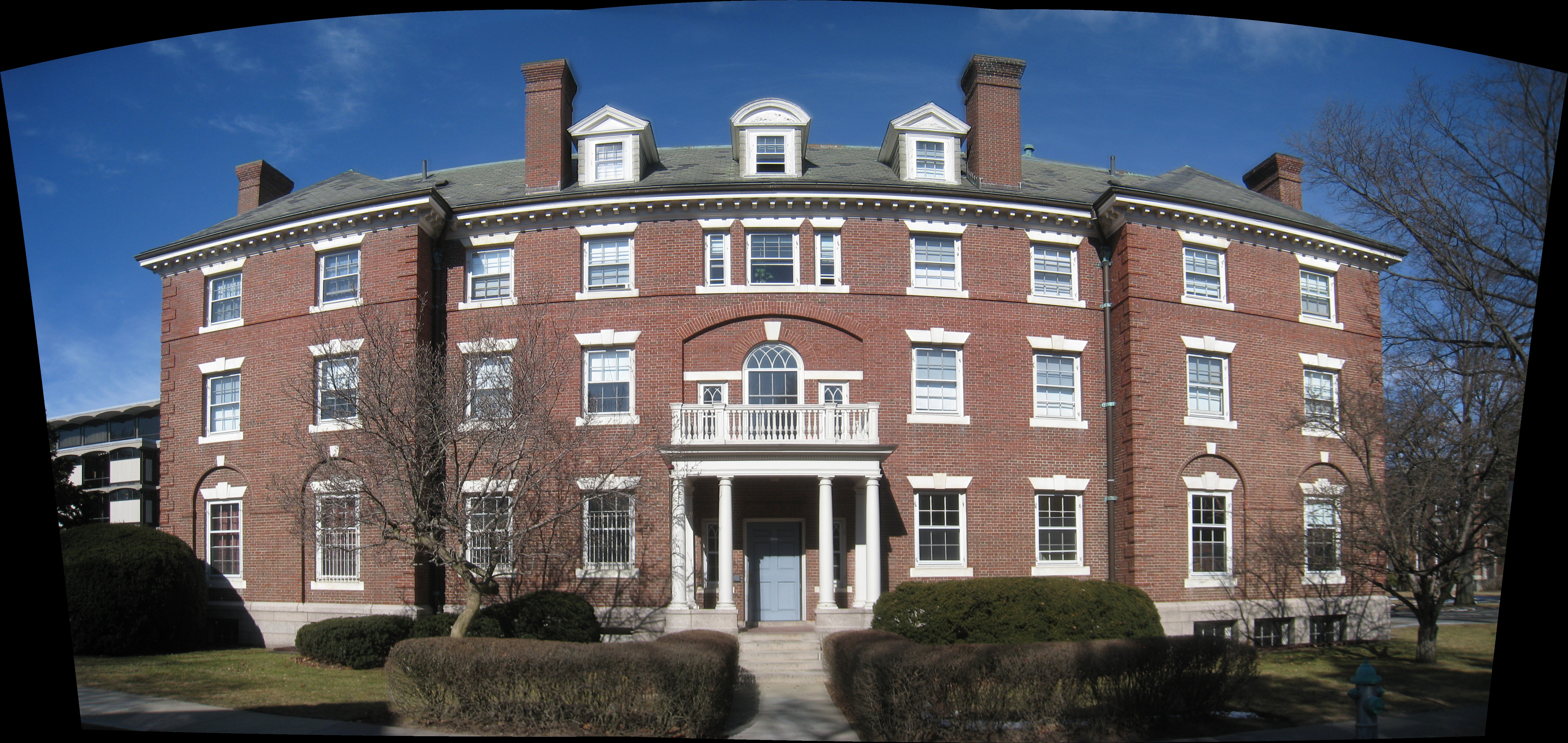

- Location within Massachusetts Location within the United States
- Location: 53 Shepard St., Cambridge, Massachusetts
- Coordinates: 42°22′51″N 71°07′27″W
- Area: less than one acre
- Built: 1901
- Architect: A. W. Longfellow Jr.
- Architectural style: Colonial Revival
- MPS: Cambridge MRA
- NRHP reference No.: 86001270
- Added to NRHP: May 19, 1986

Bertram Hall at Radcliffe College is an historic dormitory building on the Radcliffe Quadrangle of Harvard University at 53 Shepard Street in Cambridge, Massachusetts. Built in 1901, it was the first dormitory building constructed for Radcliffe College. The building is now one of the dormitories of Harvard's Cabot House. It was listed on the National Register of Historic Places in 1986.

== Description and history ==
Bertram Hall is located on the south side of the Radcliffe Quadrangle, between its grassy center and Shepard Street. It is a 3 1/2-story brick building with Georgian Revival styling. It is covered by a dormered hip roof. It is nine bays wide, with a central five-bay section and symmetrical two-bay end sections that project slightly. The building corners have brick quoining, and the eave is adorned with modillions. Most windows are set in rectangular openings with stone sills and splayed stone lintels; those on the ground floors of the end sections are set in blind round-arch recesses. The main entrance is at the center, sheltered by a single-story porch with Tuscan columns and a balustrade on the roof.

The hall was built in 1901 to a design by Alexander Wadsworth Longfellow Jr. It was the first of the quadrangle's buildings to be built, and the first dormitory building at Radcliffe College, representing a major shift in the college's policy from placement of its boarding students in private homes. It was funded by a donation from the Radcliffe class of 1895. It was named after John Bertram Kimball, the deceased eight year old son of David Pulsifer Kimball and Clara Millet Bertram Kimball, and the grandson of Captain John Bertram.

== See also ==
- National Register of Historic Places listings in Cambridge, Massachusetts
