= Palisades-Kepler State Park =

State park in Iowa, United States

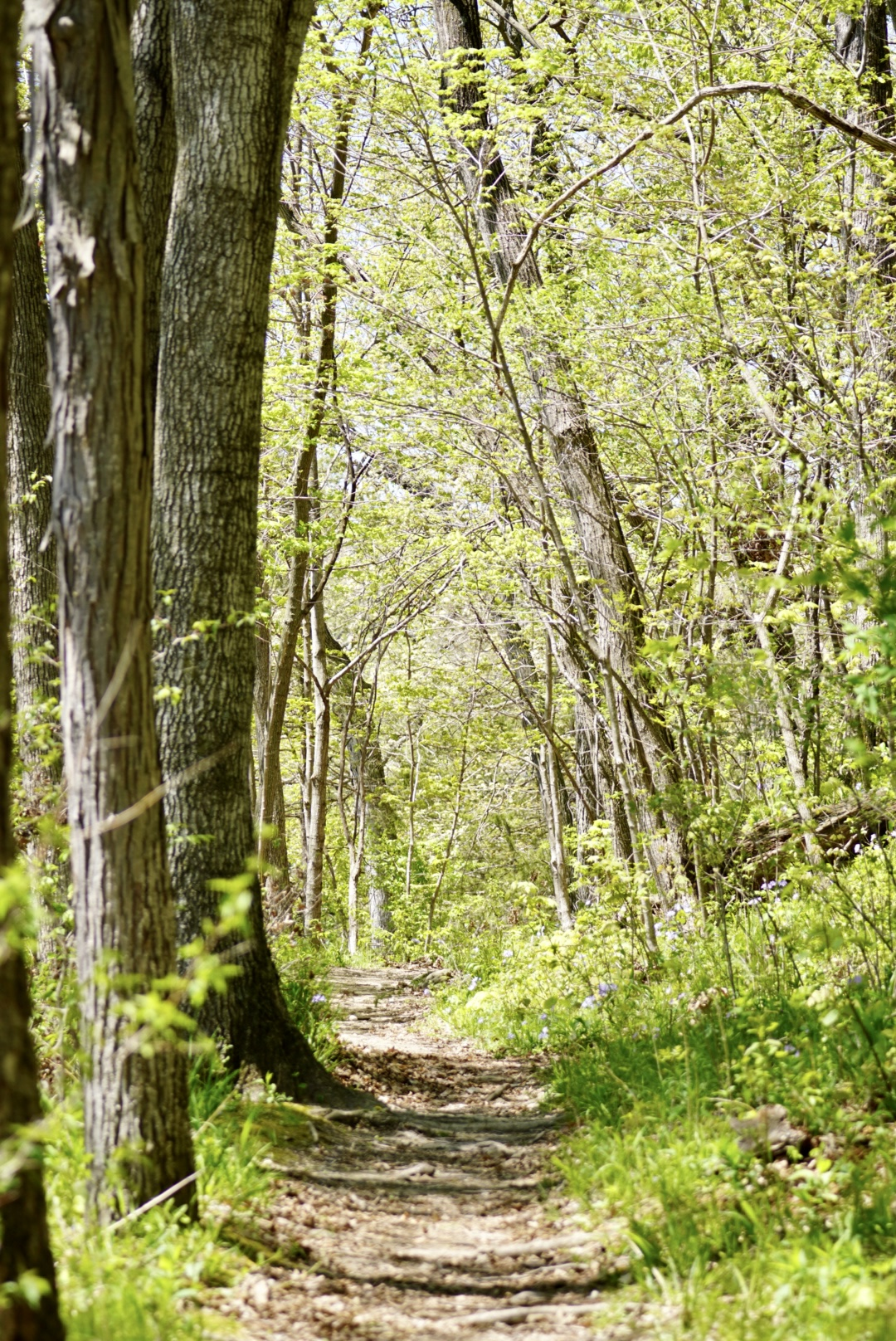
- A hiking trail at Palisades-Kepler State Park

- Location within Iowa Location within the United States
- Location: Linn County, Iowa, United States
- Nearest city: Mount Vernon, Iowa
- Coordinates: 41°54′40″N 91°30′09″W
- Area: 840 acres (340 ha)
- Established: 1922
- Administrator: Iowa Department of Natural Resources
- Website: Official website

Palisades-Kepler State Park is a 840-acre (340 ha) state park in Linn County, Iowa, United States, near the city of Mount Vernon. The park is located in a forested area on the bank of the Cedar River marked by bluffs and ravines. While the state created the park in 1922, it was greatly expanded in 1928 through the estate of Louis H. Kepler and further developed in the 1930s by the Civilian Conservation Corps (CCC).

The park includes 5 miles (8.0 km) of hiking trails from which visitors can view local flora and fauna, including white-tailed deer, turkeys, black maple trees, and wildflowers in springtime. It also features a swimming beach, a boat ramp, and fishing sites on the river; fish living in the river include bass, channel catfish, and walleye. The park has 45 electric and non-electric campsites and four cabins along with a CCC-built lodge for day use.
