= Caroline Emmerton =

American philanthropist (1866-1942)

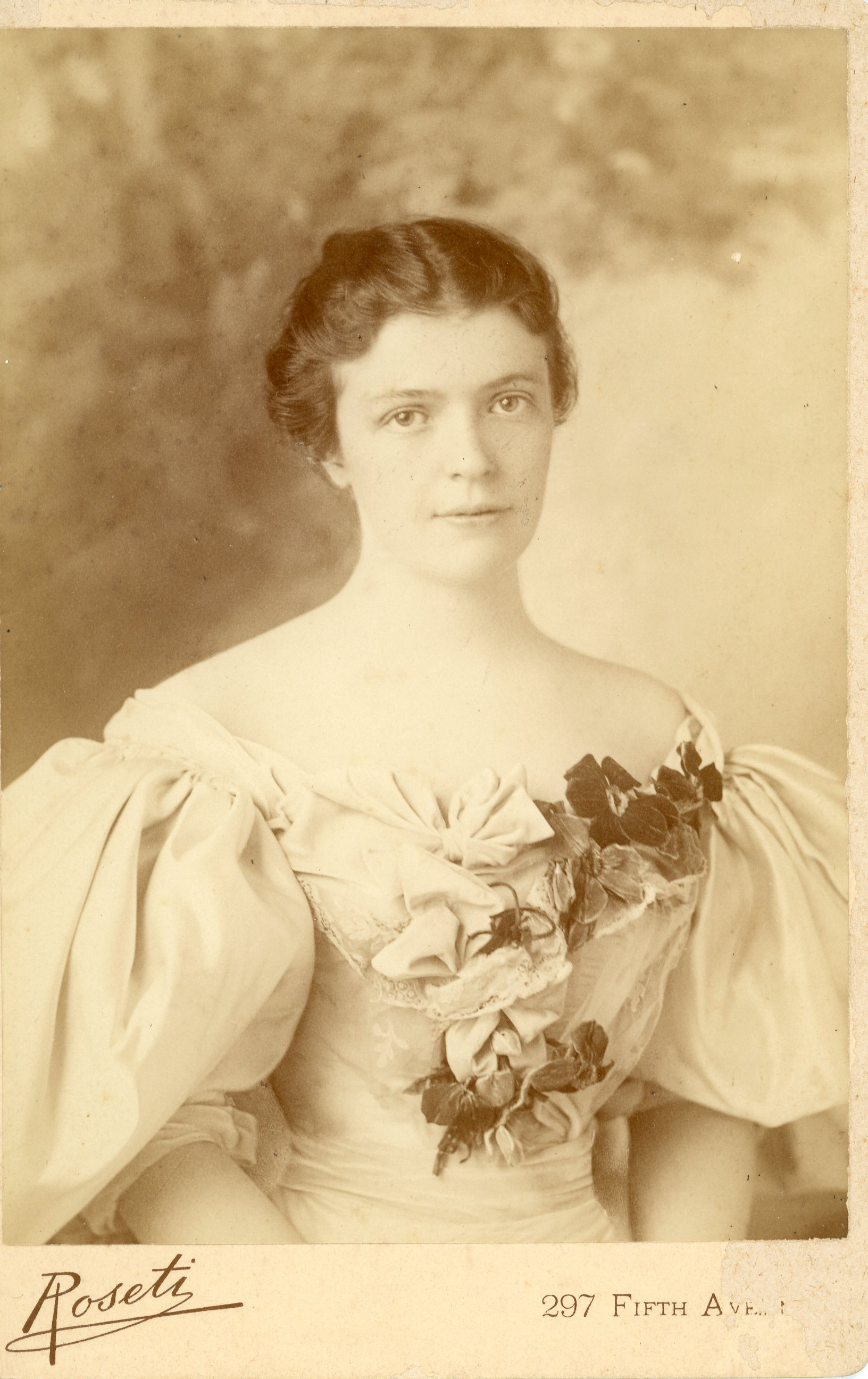
Caroline Emmerton, c.1900

Caroline Osgood Emmerton (1866–1942) was a wealthy philanthropist from Salem, Massachusetts, USA, who established The House of the Seven Gables, also known as the Turner-Ingersoll Mansion, as a settlement house and museum in 1908.

With a fortune inherited from her grandfather, maritime trader John Bertram, Emmerton carried on her family's tradition of endowing and supporting charitable good works, including the Bertram Home for Aged Men, the Salem public library, the Seaman's Widow and Orphan Society, the Family Service Association, the Salem Fraternity Boys Club and the city's Public Welfare Society, as well as the Society for the Preservation of New England Antiquities (now Historic New England), of which she was a founding member. By the age of 28 she was a board of director for the Charter St. Home, now the North Shore Medical Center/Salem Hospital.

In 1907, she joined with a group of women to explore forming a settlement house in Salem to provide social services to the immigrant families living in Salem. By the following year, these women had begun to offer classes in sewing and other crafts and activities in an old Seaman's Bethel next to the historic Turner-Ingersoll Mansion, which was also known as the house that Nathaniel Hawthorne had written about in his novel The House of the Seven Gables. In 1908, she bought the Turner-Ingersoll house from the Uptons who moved to the Salem Willows neighborhood, what is today the Salem Willows Historic District. Caroline hired Joseph Everett Chandler as the architect to restore the house to its historical appearance with some changes made to match Hawthorne's book. In 1910 she opened the house to public tours and used the revenue to support the Settlement work.

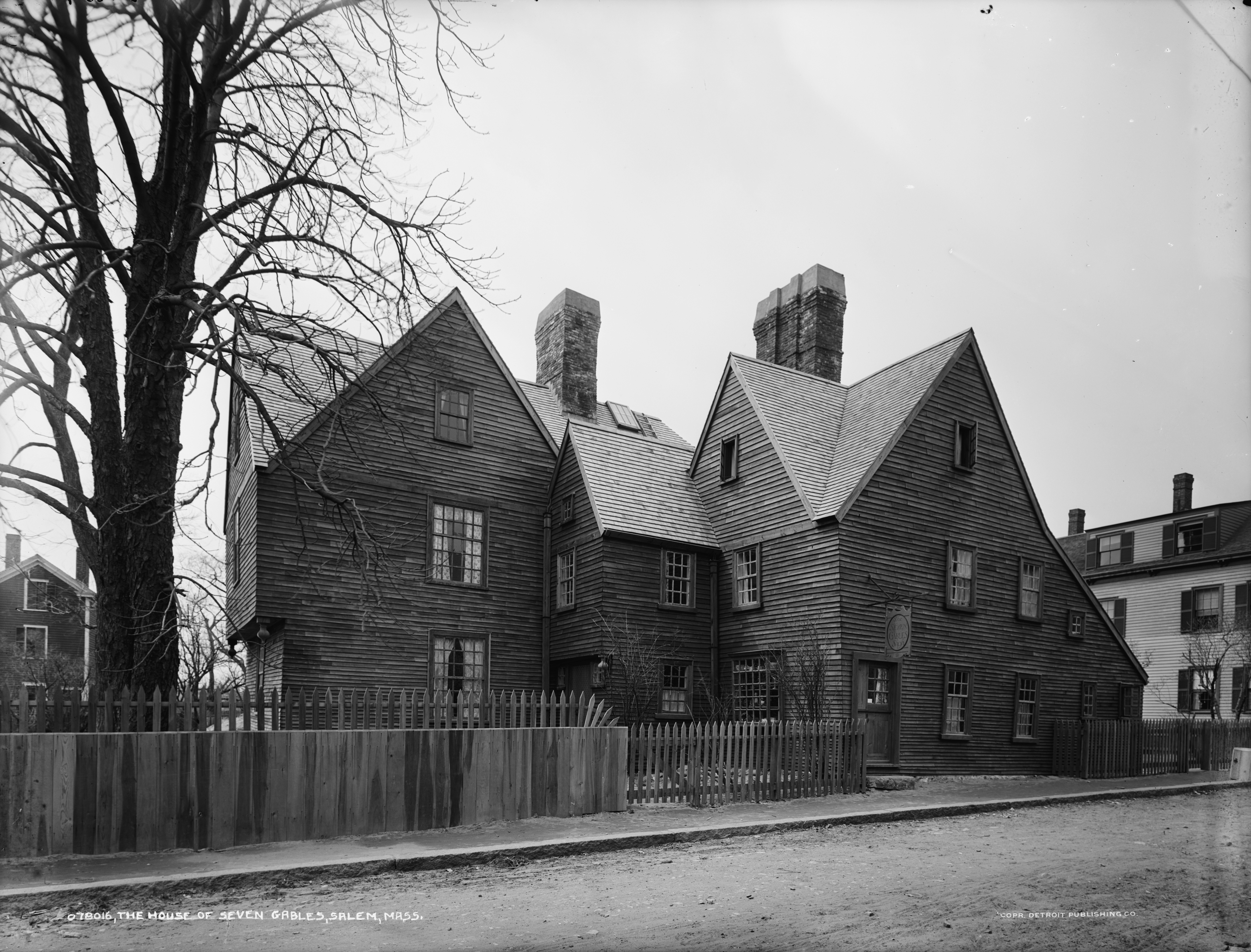
The House of the Seven Gables in 1915

Like many American settlement house founders and workers, Emmerton saw exposure to historic environments and stories as a way for new immigrants to absorb democratic values and practices. "If, as is generally conceded, the settlements do the best Americanization work," she wrote, "should not this settlement excel whose home is the ancient House of Seven Gables, the foundations of which were laid by the first immigrants who came here long ago, strangers in a strange land?" Over time, Emmerton continued to expand and reorganize the compound, eventually moving four additional colonial-era buildings to the site and working with the colonial revival architect Joseph Everett Chandler to restore them.
