= Mount Vernon Commercial Historic District =

Historic district in Iowa, United States

- Mount Vernon Commercial; Historic District
- U.S. National Register of Historic Places
- U.S. Historic district
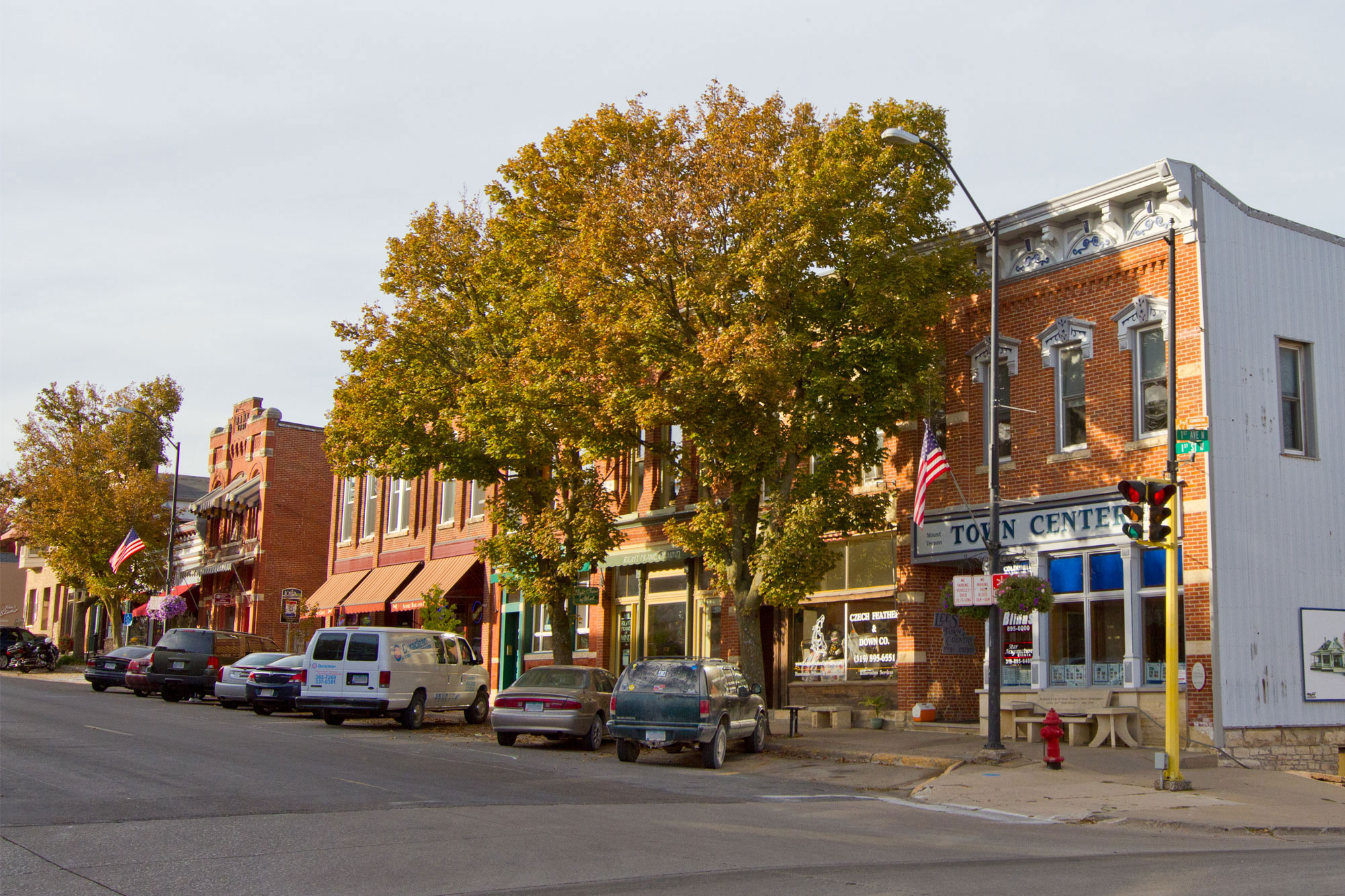

- Location within Iowa Location within the United States
- Location: 1st St. between 2nd and 1st Aves., N., Mount Vernon, Iowa
- Coordinates: 41°55′21″N 91°25′03″W
- Area: 3.5 acres (1.4 ha)
- Architect: Josselyn and Taylor
- Architectural style: Victorian
- MPS: Mount Vernon MPS
- NRHP reference No.: 93000898
- Added to NRHP: September 13, 1993

The Mount Vernon Commercial Historic District is a nationally recognized historic district located in Mount Vernon, Iowa, United States. It was listed on the National Register of Historic Places in 1993. At the time of its nomination it consisted of 18 resources, which included 16 contributing buildings and two non-contributing buildings. This linear historic district is a block and a half in the middle of the central business district. It follows the ridgeline of the paha that defines the town. The buildings were constructed between 1860 and the 1930s, with most of them in place by the turn of the 20th century. Eight of them were built in the 1890s. The district is also unified in appearance with two-story pressed brick facades, ornate metal cornices, heavy pedimented window hoods, and roughly dressed limestone trim dominate. The decorative elements recall Mount Vernon's railroad-related prosperity, as they were brought in by train.
