= Ash Park Historic District =

Historic district in Iowa, United States

- U.S. National Register of Historic Places
- U.S. Historic district
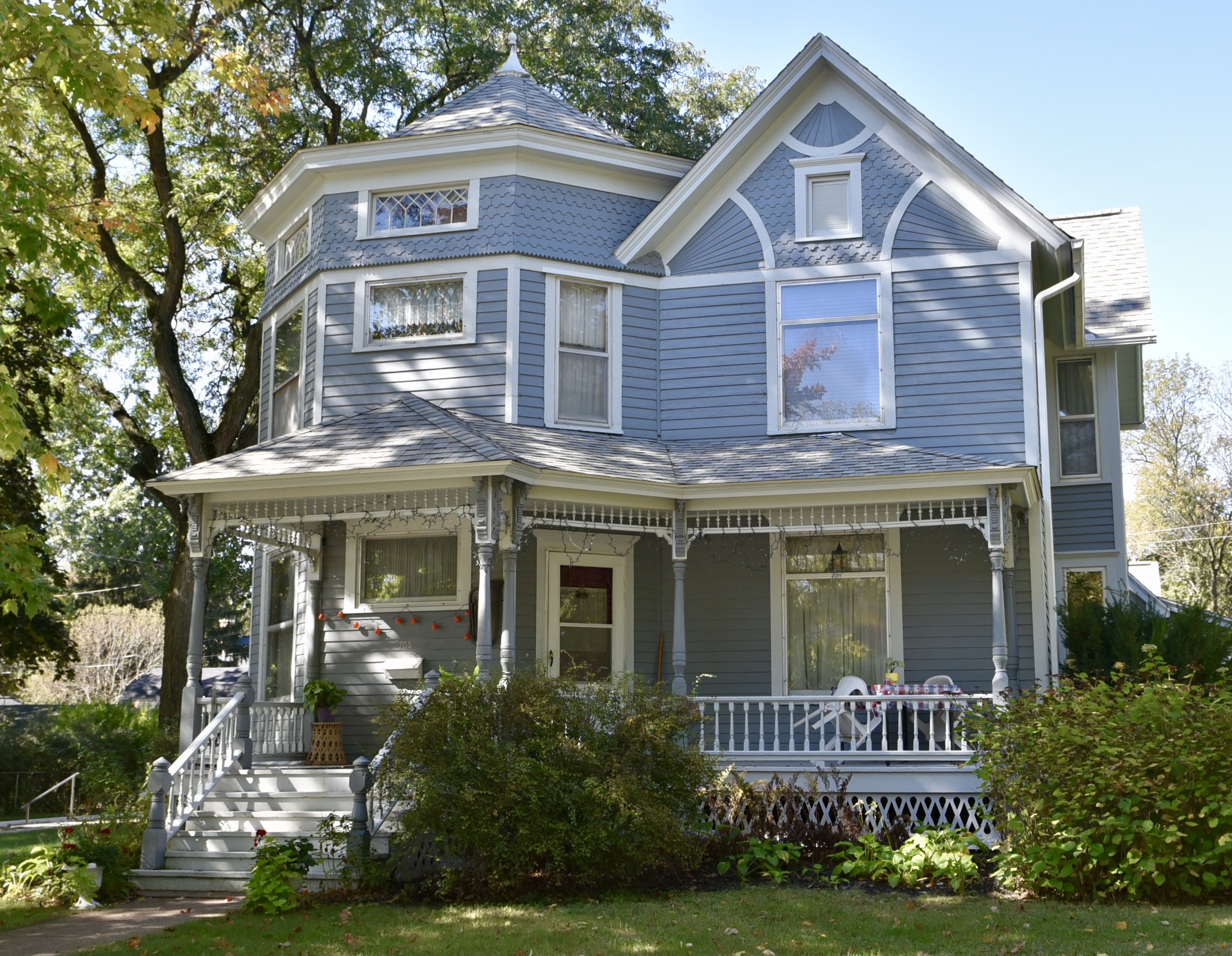
- William B. Van Valkenburg House (1896)

- Location within Iowa Location within the United States
- Location: 5th–8th Avenues North, between 6th and 8th Streets, Northwest, Mount Vernon, Iowa
- Coordinates: 41°55′40″N 91°25′15″W
- Area: 17.7 acres (7.2 ha)
- Built by: Daniel C. Hartung
- Architectural style: Late Victorian; Late 19th and Early 20th Century Revivals
- MPS: Mount Vernon MPS
- NRHP reference No.: 93000899
- Added to NRHP: September 13, 1993

The Ash Park Historic District is a nationally recognized historic district located in Mount Vernon, Iowa, United States. It was listed on the National Register of Historic Places in 1993. At the time of its nomination it consisted of 42 resources, which included 32 contributing buildings and 10 non-contributing buildings.

Charles P. Whittemore and William E. Platner platted Ash Park on the former Reuben Ash farm on August 17, 1893. Platner operated the local stone quarry, and many of the house foundations are made of stone and are a reminder of his role in developing the neighborhood. The Panic of 1893 was a setback for the developers, but by 1895 the local economy had recovered enough that lots began to sell. Thirty-six of the 42 houses in the district were built between 1895 and 1919. Construction was sporadic until the 1960s, with the last five houses built after that.

The district also represents Mount Vernon's railroad-related prosperity, as most of the houses are from this era and remain relatively unchanged. They exemplify the popular architectural styles of the era, especially the various Victorian and revival styles in vogue at the time.
