= Wesley West House =

Historic house in Iowa, United States

- U.S. National Register of Historic Places
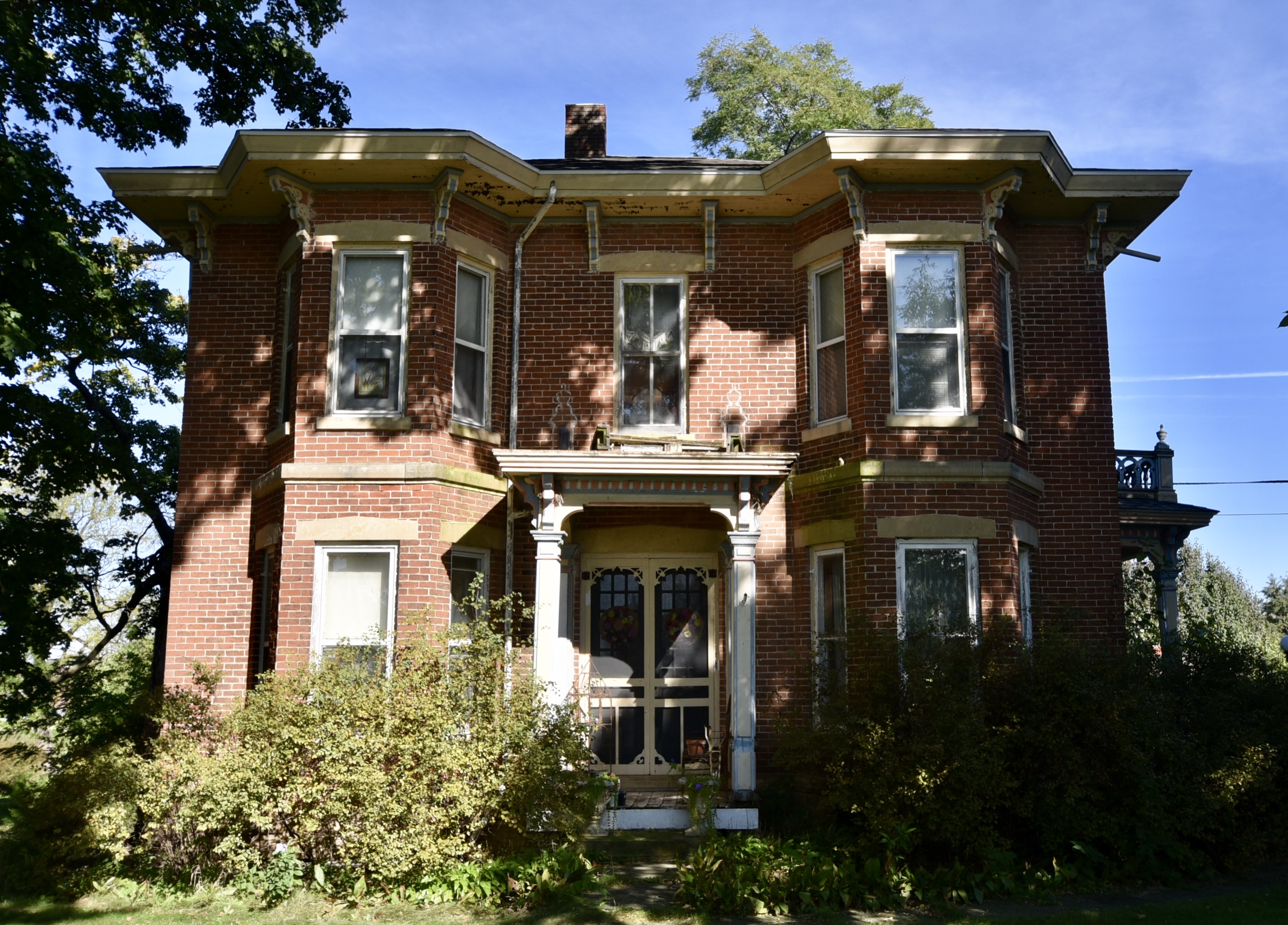

- Location within Iowa Location within the United States
- Location: Palisades Rd. Mount Vernon, Iowa
- Coordinates: 41°55′04.3″N 91°25′43.9″W
- Area: less than one acre
- Built: 1877; 149 years ago
- Built by: Marsden Keyes
- Architectural style: Italianate
- NRHP reference No.: 85001380
- Added to NRHP: June 27, 1985

The Wesley West House is a historic building located in Mount Vernon, Iowa, United States. West and his wife Polly settled here in 1859. He had local builders Marsden Keyes and Charles H. Davis build this two-story, brick, Italianate residence on his 170-acre (69 ha) farm in 1877. After Wesley West died in 1894, his son David acquired the house and did an extensive renovation in 1897. The house remained in the family until 1982. It features a square plan with a single story off-centered kitchen wing, a symmetrical facade, and a hipped roof with bracketed eaves. The house was listed on the National Register of Historic Places in 1985.
