= Salem Public Library (Massachusetts) =

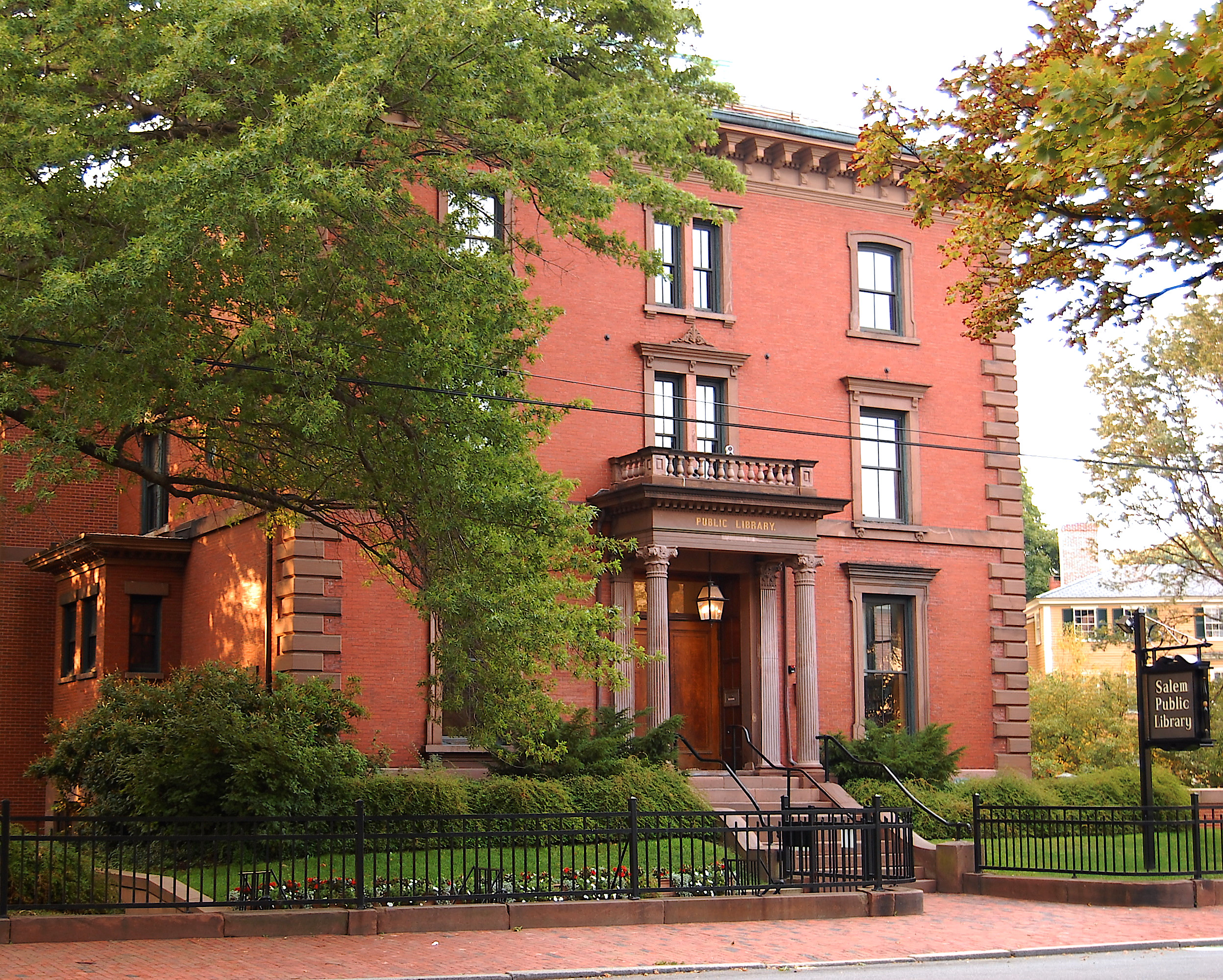
- Salem Public Library, former house of sea captain John Bertram
- Location: Salem, Massachusetts, United States
- Type: Public
- Established: December 1, 1887

Other information
- Director: Tara Mansfield
- Website: Official website

The Salem Public Library is a public library at 370 Essex Street in Salem, Massachusetts. The library building was constructed in 1855 for John Bertram, a prominent sea captain, and his family.

On December 1, 1887, the Bertram family wrote a letter stating their intent to donate the Italianate style mansion to the city of Salem for use as a library, and the city accepted the offer. The library opened its doors on July 8, 1889. The library is part of the North of Boston Library Exchange (NOBLE), a consortium of 26 public and academic libraries, and is located within the Chestnut Street Historic District.
