= Mount Vernon, Iowa =

- City
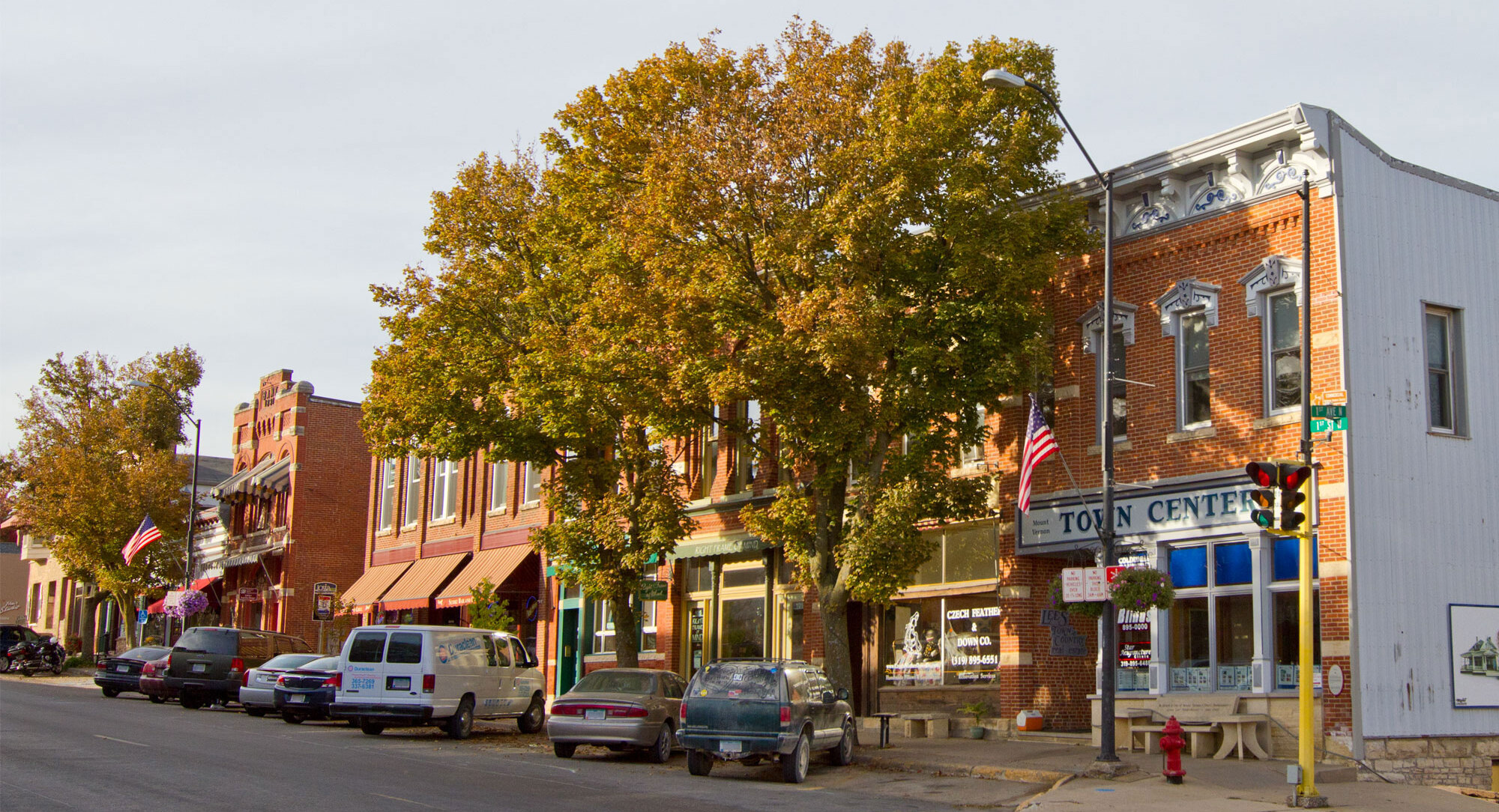
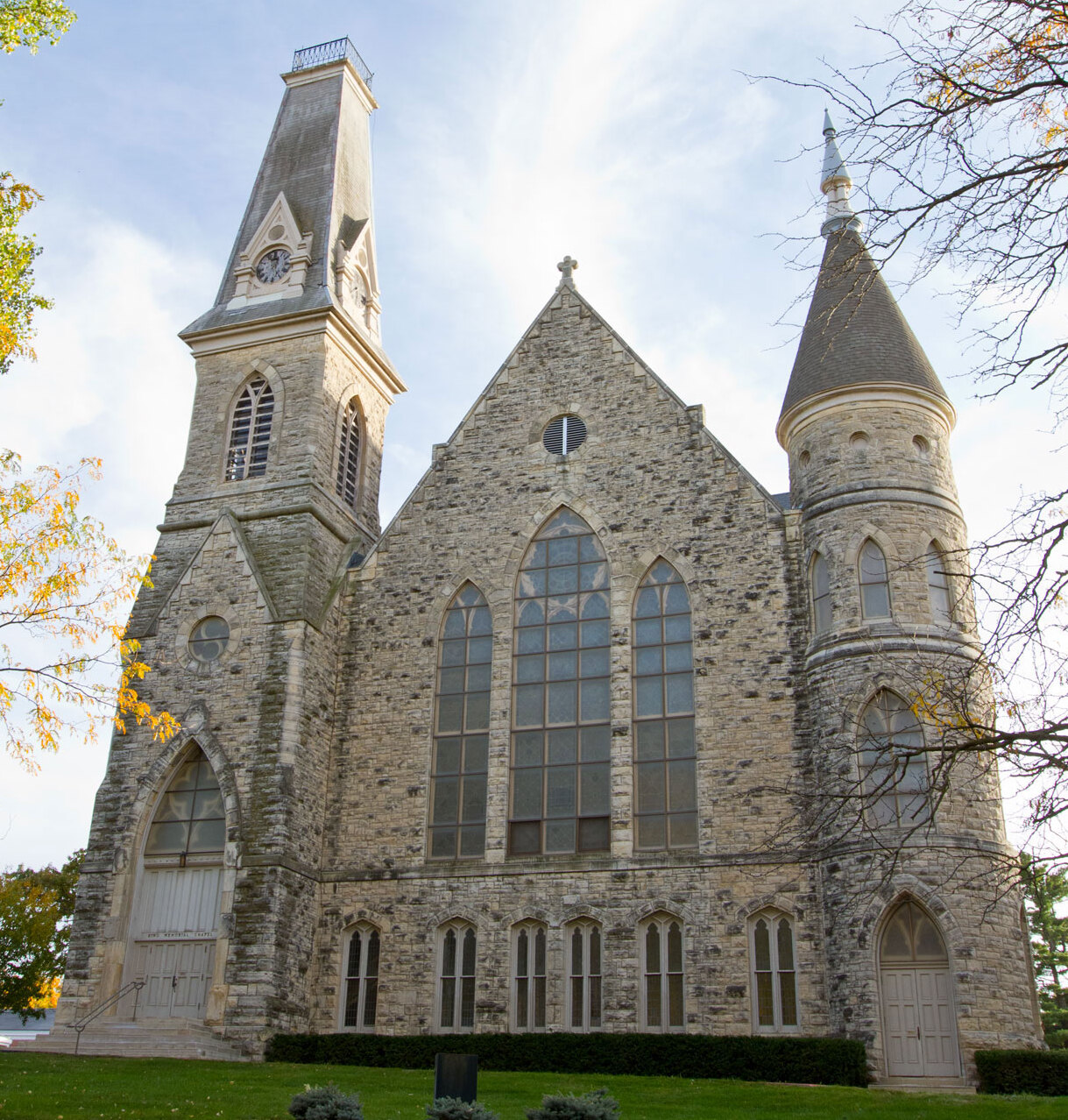
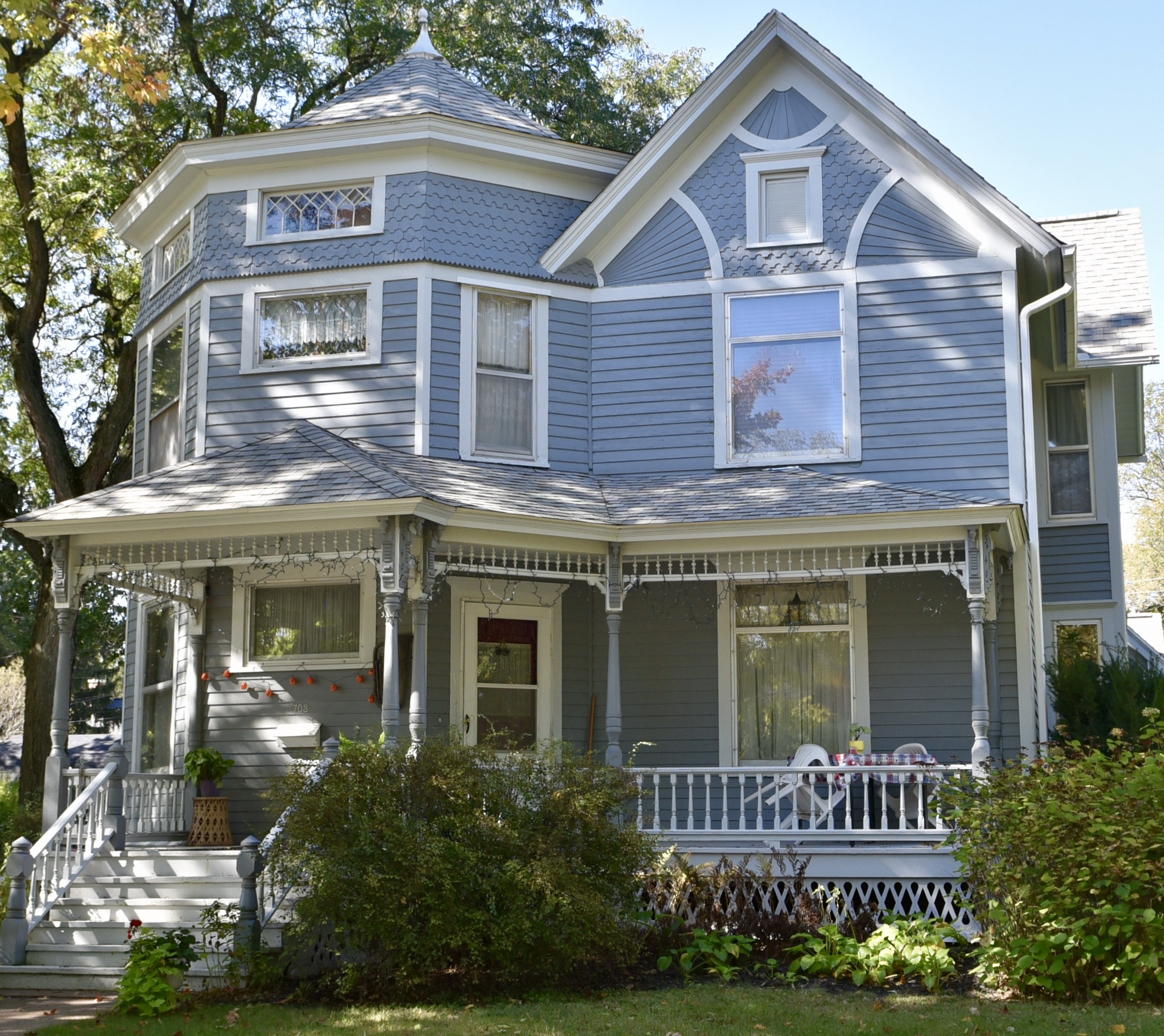
- Mount Vernon Commercial Historic District King Memorial Chapel at Cornell College Ash Park Historic District

- Location of Mount Vernon, Iowa

- Location in the United States
- Coordinates: 41°55′23″N 91°25′28″W
- Country: United States
- State: Iowa
- County: Linn

Area
  - Total: 3.50 sq mi (9.07 km^{2})
  - Land: 3.49 sq mi (9.05 km^{2})
  - Water: 0.0077 sq mi (0.02 km^{2})
- Elevation: 873 ft (266 m)

Population (2020)
  - Total: 4,527
  - Density: 1,295.2/sq mi (500.07/km^{2})
- Time zone: UTC-6 (Central (CST))
  - Summer (DST): UTC-5 (CDT)
- ZIP code: 52314
- Area code: 319
- FIPS code: 19-54840
- GNIS feature ID: 2395130
- Website: City Website

Mount Vernon is a city in Linn County, Iowa, United States, adjacent to the city of Lisbon. The population was 4,527 at the time of the 2020 census. Mount Vernon is part of the Cedar Rapids metropolitan area. Mount Vernon is home of Cornell College, a private liberal arts college.

== History ==
Mount Vernon was laid out in 1847, but its origins date back to at least 1838, when it was known as Pinhook, a rest stop on Military Road, which ran between Dubuque, on the Mississippi River, and Iowa City. It was renamed Mount Vernon in 1847, after the estate of George Washington. A post office has been in operation in Mount Vernon since 1849. The Iowa Conference (Methodist) Male and Female Seminary (which later became Cornell College) was established in the town in 1853, and the Northwestern Railroad reached it in 1859, bringing new business to the town as its population expanded.

== Geography ==
Mount Vernon has a total area of 3.50 square miles (9.06 km^{2}), of which 3.49 square miles (9.04 km^{2}) is land and 0.01 square miles (0.03 km^{2}) is water.

The most prominent geographic feature of Mount Vernon is the "mountain" on which it sits. This "mountain" is actually a paha, a ridge formed of sand and loess along the line of the prevailing wind during the ice ages. The Mount Vernon paha is roughly one mile (2 km) long and 1/4 mile (1/2 km) wide, aligned along a roughly northwest to southeast axis and rising up to 100 feet (30 m) above the surrounding landscape. Uptown Mount Vernon is aligned with the southeast end of the ridge crest, while the campus of Cornell College crowns the northwest end of the ridge.

=== Transportation ===
The town is located on significant transportation corridors, both current and historical. The main line of the Union Pacific Railroad passes through the city, and the town is located on the historic Lincoln Highway. U.S. Route 30 and Iowa Highway 1 intersect in the southern part of town. Passenger train service was once provided by the Chicago and North Western Railway from a station in the north of town. The CRANDIC interurban electric railway ran from Cedar Rapids, through downtown Mount Vernon, and ended in nearby Lisbon. The interurban ran from 1914 to 1928 and took 45 minutes to travel to the western terminus of Cedar Rapids. Nearby stops included Bertram, the Palisades and Cornell College.

== Demographics ==
=== 2020 census ===
As of the 2020 census, Mount Vernon had a population of 4,527, with 1,387 households and 976 families. The population density was 1,295.2 inhabitants per square mile (500.1/km^{2}). There were 1,478 housing units at an average density of 422.9 per square mile (163.3/km^{2}).

Historical populations
Year	Pop.	±%
1870	910	—
1880	977	+7.4%
1890	1,259	+28.9%
1900	1,629	+29.4%
1910	1,532	−6.0%
1920	1,466	−4.3%
1930	1,441	−1.7%
1940	1,489	+3.3%
1950	2,320	+55.8%
1960	2,593	+11.8%
1970	3,018	+16.4%
1980	3,325	+10.2%
1990	3,657	+10.0%
2000	3,390	−7.3%
2010	4,506	+32.9%
2020	4,527	+0.5%
Source:"U.S. Census website". United States Census Bureau. and Iowa Data Center; Source: U.S. Decennial Census

The median age was 28.2 years. 22.7% of residents were under the age of 18, 31.3% were under the age of 20, 16.4% were between the ages of 20 and 24, 19.2% were from 25 to 44, 20.4% were from 45 to 64, and 12.7% were 65 years of age or older. The gender makeup of the city was 49.4% male and 50.6% female. For every 100 females there were 97.7 males, and for every 100 females age 18 and over there were 95.7 males age 18 and over.

Of the 1,387 households, 37.9% had children under the age of 18 living with them. Of all households, 55.5% were married-couple households, 6.8% were cohabitating couples, 22.9% had a female householder with no spouse or partner present, and 14.9% had a male householder with no spouse or partner present. 29.6% of households were non-families. 24.5% of all households were made up of individuals, and 9.6% had someone living alone who was 65 years of age or older.

Of the 1,478 housing units, 6.2% were vacant. The homeowner vacancy rate was 1.4% and the rental vacancy rate was 8.4%. 96.4% of residents lived in urban areas, while 3.6% lived in rural areas.

Racial composition as of the 2020 census
Race	Number	Percent
White	4,102	90.6%
Black or African American	68	1.5%
American Indian and Alaska Native	15	0.3%
Asian	92	2.0%
Native Hawaiian and Other Pacific Islander	2	0.0%
Some other race	55	1.2%
Two or more races	193	4.3%
Hispanic or Latino (of any race)	161	3.6%

=== 2010 census ===
At the 2010 census there were 4,506 people in 1,353 households, including 894 families, in the city. The population density was 1,291.1 inhabitants per square mile (498.5/km^{2}). There were 1,397 housing units at an average density of 400.3 per square mile (154.6/km^{2}). The racial makup of the city was 95.0% White, 0.9% African American, 0.2% Native American, 1.7% Asian, 0.5% from other races, and 1.6% from two or more races. Hispanic or Latino of any race were 1.9%.

Of the 1,353 households 37.3% had children under the age of 18 living with them, 54.2% were married couples living together, 9.2% had a female householder with no husband present, 2.7% had a male householder with no wife present, and 33.9% were non-families. 26.5% of households were one person and 8.9% were one person aged 65 or older. The average household size was 2.54 and the average family size was 3.14.

The median age was 24.4 years. 22.9% of residents were under the age of 18; 27.7% were between the ages of 18 and 24; 19.7% were from 25 to 44; 20.1% were from 45 to 64; and 9.5% were 65 or older. The gender makeup of the city was 48.5% male and 51.5% female.

=== 2000 census ===
The city's population was 3,390 when the 2000 census figures were released, but that number was later revised to 3,808 because the Census Bureau had incorrectly reported that 418 residents of Cornell College dormitories in Mount Vernon lived in the nearby city of Bertram.

At the 2000 census there were 3,390 people in 1,129 households, including 795 families, in the city. The population density was 973.0 inhabitants per square mile (375.7/km^{2}). There were 1,192 housing units at an average density of 342.1 per square mile (132.1/km^{2}). The racial makup of the city was 97.05% White, 0.65% African American, 0.24% Native American, 0.71% Asian, 0.03% Pacific Islander, 0.41% from other races, and 0.91% from two or more races. Hispanic or Latino of any race were 0.94%.

Of the 1,129 households 37.6% had children under the age of 18 living with them, 57.8% were married couples living together, 9.3% had a female householder with no husband present, and 29.5% were non-families. 23.3% of households were one person and 7.7% were one person aged 65 or older. The average household size was 2.58 and the average family size was 3.09.

The age spread: 25.6% under the age of 18, 20.5% from 18 to 24, 23.2% from 25 to 44, 21.5% from 45 to 64, and 9.2% 65 or older. The median age was 30 years. For every 100 females, there were 87.9 males. For every 100 females age 18 and over, there were 80.9 males.

The median household income was $51,228 and the median family income was $59,205. Males had a median income of $39,402 versus $27,358 for females. The per capita income for the city was $19,027. About 4.1% of families and 5.5% of the population were below the poverty line, including 4.2% of those under age 18 and 3.3% of those age 65 or over.

== Arts and culture ==
Located on Highway 30, is local artist Mark Benesh's rendition of Grant Wood's American Gothic, on the side of a barn.

=== Annual events ===
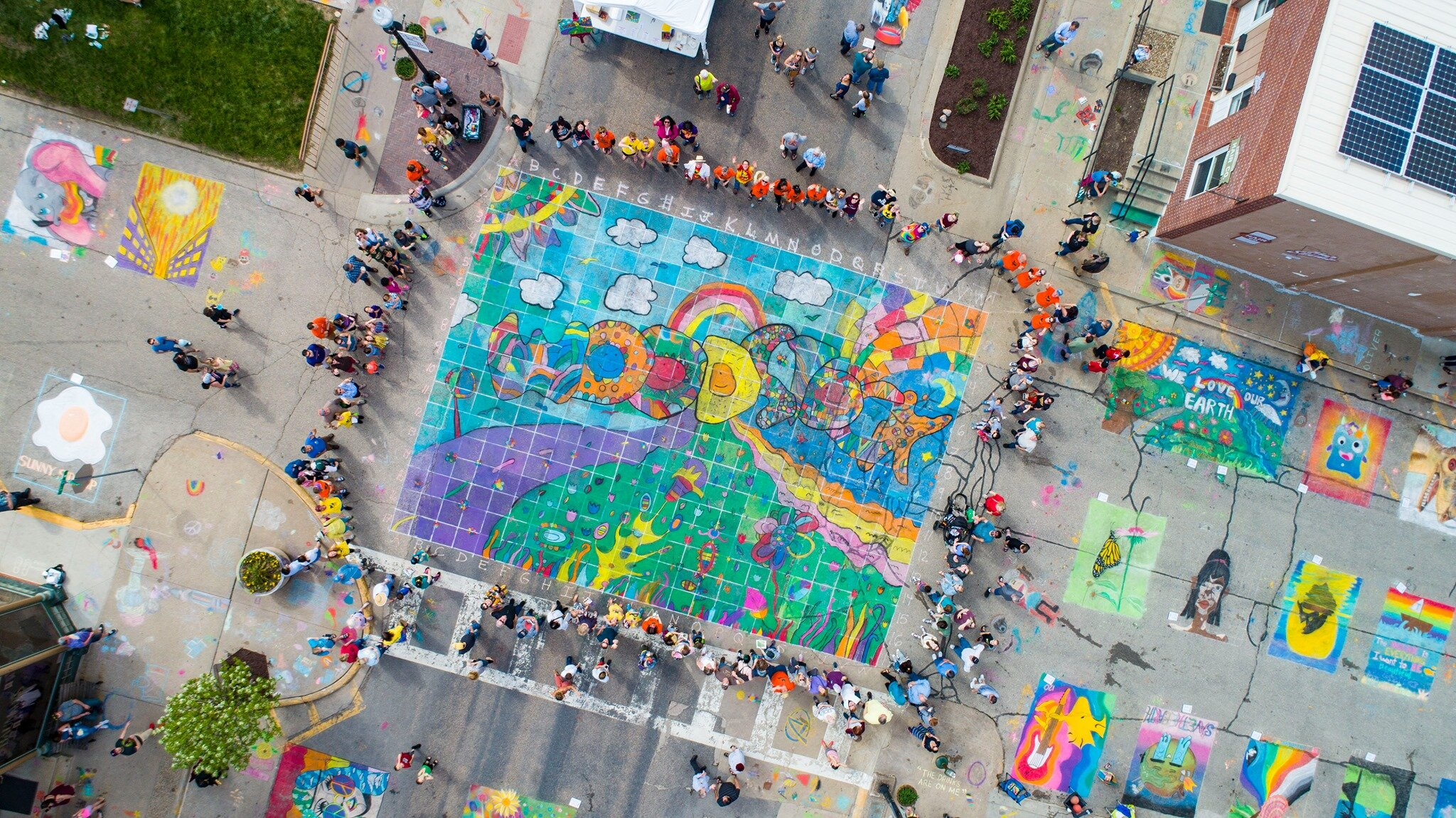
Chalk the Walk 2019: Main Art Piece

A sidewalk chalk festival, Chalk the Walk, has taken place in Mount Vernon each May starting in 2006. Several blocks in Uptown Mount Vernon are closed to traffic, and people from all over are encouraged to create their own artwork on more than 4,000 square feet (370 m^{2}) of the main street. The event attracts over 300 artists and requires more than a half-ton of chalk. Artists register to color an 8' x 10' section of pavement with their own design. Although participation is free, cash prizes are awarded for these large drawings. Each year there is also one large collaborative piece of art that is 20' by 40'. Interested participants recreate a single 2' by 2' square of the image; the result is an image colored with pastel chalk by dozens of artists of all ages and abilities. Chalk the Walk is Iowa's largest annual Madonnari Festival.

Magical Night, a downtown Christmas festival, takes place in December.

Other events include the Chocolate Stroll, Heritage Days, Chili Cook-Off, and Uptown Thursday Nights.

=== Popular culture ===
In the October 2009 edition of Budget Travel Magazine in an article entitled America's Coolest Small Towns, Mount Vernon was included as one of the ten towns. A quote from the magazine. "Every now and then, you stumble upon a town that's gotten everything right—great coffee, food with character, shop owners with purpose."

Mount Vernon is the home of Cornell College, a liberal arts institution with an enrollment of approximately 1,082 students. Cornell's entire campus is on the National Register of Historic Places.

== Education ==
Mount Vernon has an elementary school, middle school, and high school all situated on the Mount Vernon Community School District campus. The newest building of the three, Mount Vernon's high school, was built in 2006. Previously, the high school was situated at the current middle school. The middle school at the time, however, instead was located uptown in what is now the First Street Community Center.

In the United States general elections, 2006, Cornell College political science professor Dave Loebsack was elected to the U.S. House of Representatives in an upset victory over 15-term incumbent Jim Leach.

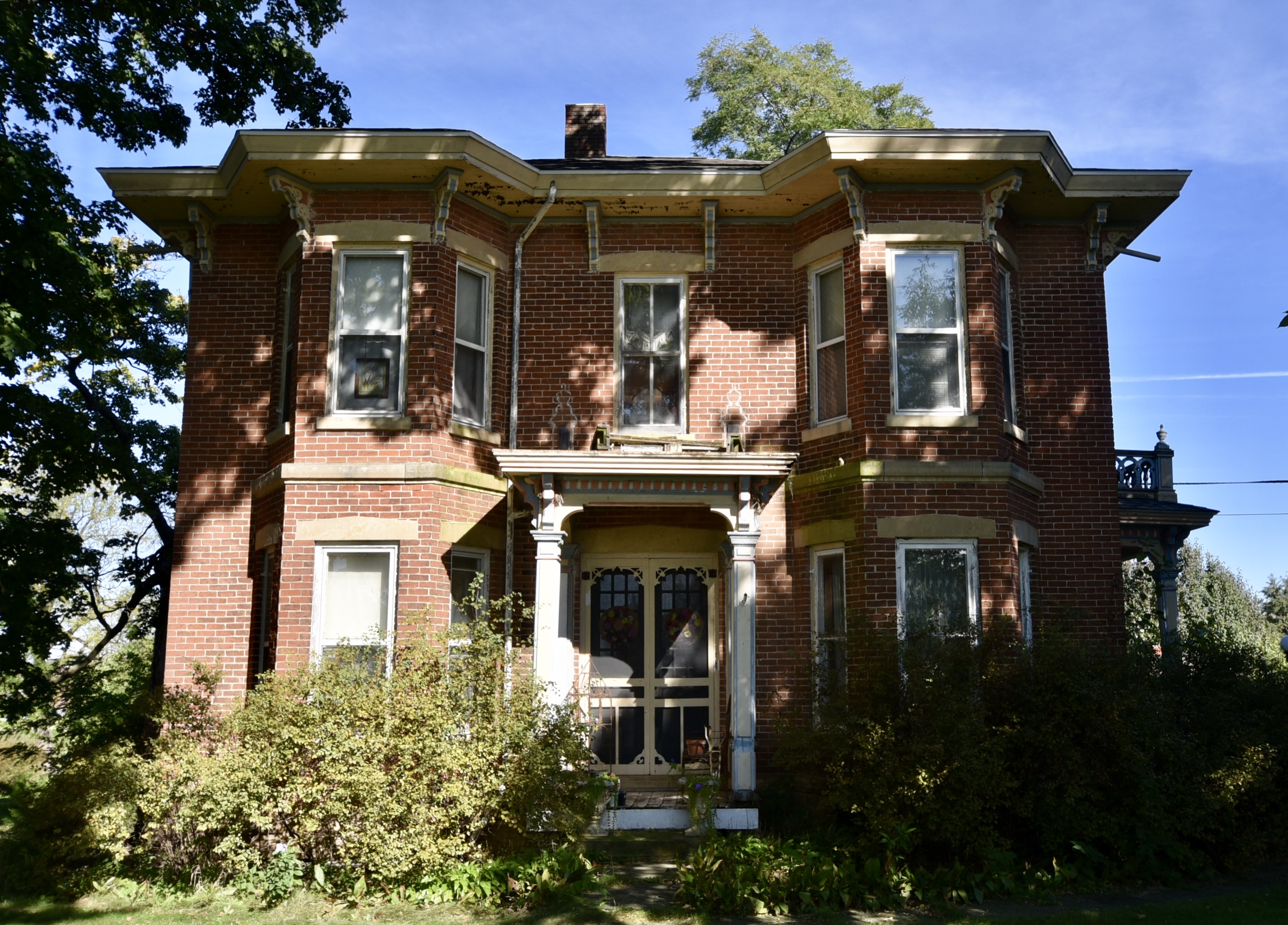
The Wesley West House was built in 1877 and is one of many Mount Vernon structures on the National Register of Historic Places.

== Notable people ==
- Leo Beranek (1914–2016), MIT professor and scientist who attended college in Mount Vernon
- Peter Kollman (1944–2001), chemist and professor
- Dan Bern (b. 1959), folk musician
- Ira G. Needles (1893–1986), chancellor of the University of Waterloo
- Jefferson White (b. 1989), American actor
- Jack Cochrane (b. 1999), National Football League player
- Tristan Wirfs (b. 1999), National Football League player
