= NoHo (disambiguation) =

NoHo or Noho may refer to:

== Places ==
- NoHo (Hong Kong), a neighborhood north of Hollywood Road in Hong Kong
- NoHo, Manhattan, a neighborhood in New York City "North of Houston" Street
- North Hollywood, Los Angeles, California
  - NoHo Arts District, Los Angeles, California
- Northampton, Massachusetts

== Structures ==
- NoHo Square, a planned development on the site of the former Middlesex Hospital, London, abandoned in 2008
- Pforzheimer House, formerly North House, a dormitory at Harvard University
