= Mather House (Harvard College) =

Residential House of Harvard College

- Harvard University
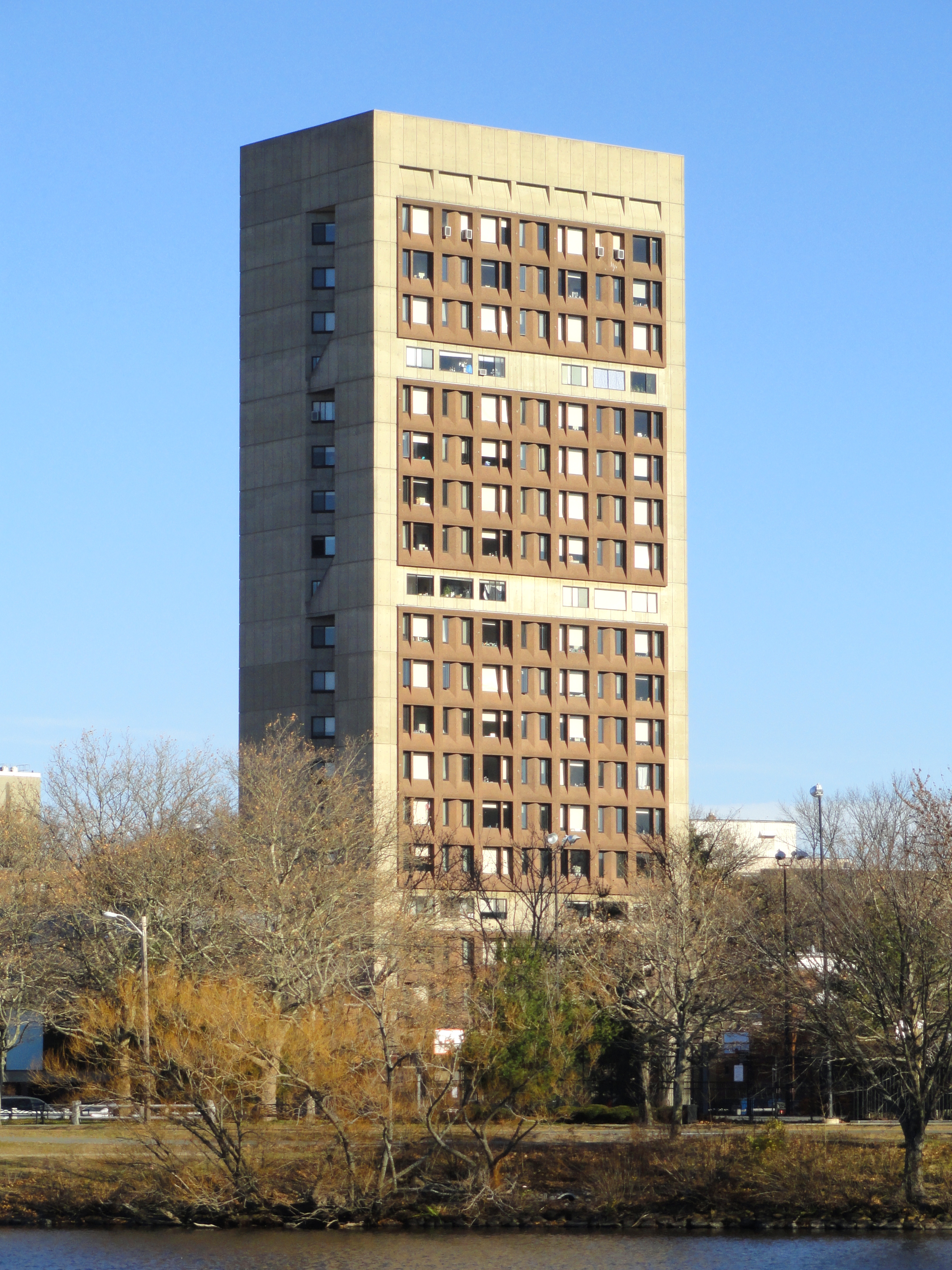
- Mather House viewed from across the Charles River

- Shield
- Location: 10 Cowperthwaite Street
- Coordinates: 42°22′06″N 71°06′55″W
- Established: 1970
- Named for: Increase Mather
- Sister college: Morse College
- Faculty Deans: Lakshminarayanan and Amala Mahadevan
- Dean: Luke Leafgren
- Website: mather.harvard.edu

Mather House is one of twelve undergraduate residential Houses at Harvard University. Opened in 1970, it is named after Increase Mather, a Puritan in the Massachusetts Bay Colony who served as President of Harvard University from 1681 to 1701. Mather's Faculty Deans are Lakshminarayanan Mahadevan and Amala Mahadevan.

Mather is known for its nineteen-story concrete tower built in a Brutalist style. Mather's blocky concrete architecture reflects the anti-uprising style of the day of its construction.

Mather residents are guaranteed single bedrooms for all three years of their residency. Mather's second building, a low-rise surrounding a courtyard, has suites with large common rooms and small bedrooms, whereas suites in the high-rise have large bedrooms and no common rooms. Other than houses in the Radcliffe Quadrangle, Mather is the house farthest from Harvard Yard, but the school provides regular shuttle service between the Yard and Mather's courtyard.

Mather House was a favorite choice for hard-partying varsity athletes before housing assignments were randomized by the school. The house is known among students for its social life and a spacious, newly remodeled dining hall with a view of the Charles River.

Mather's sister college is Morse College at Yale University.

== History ==
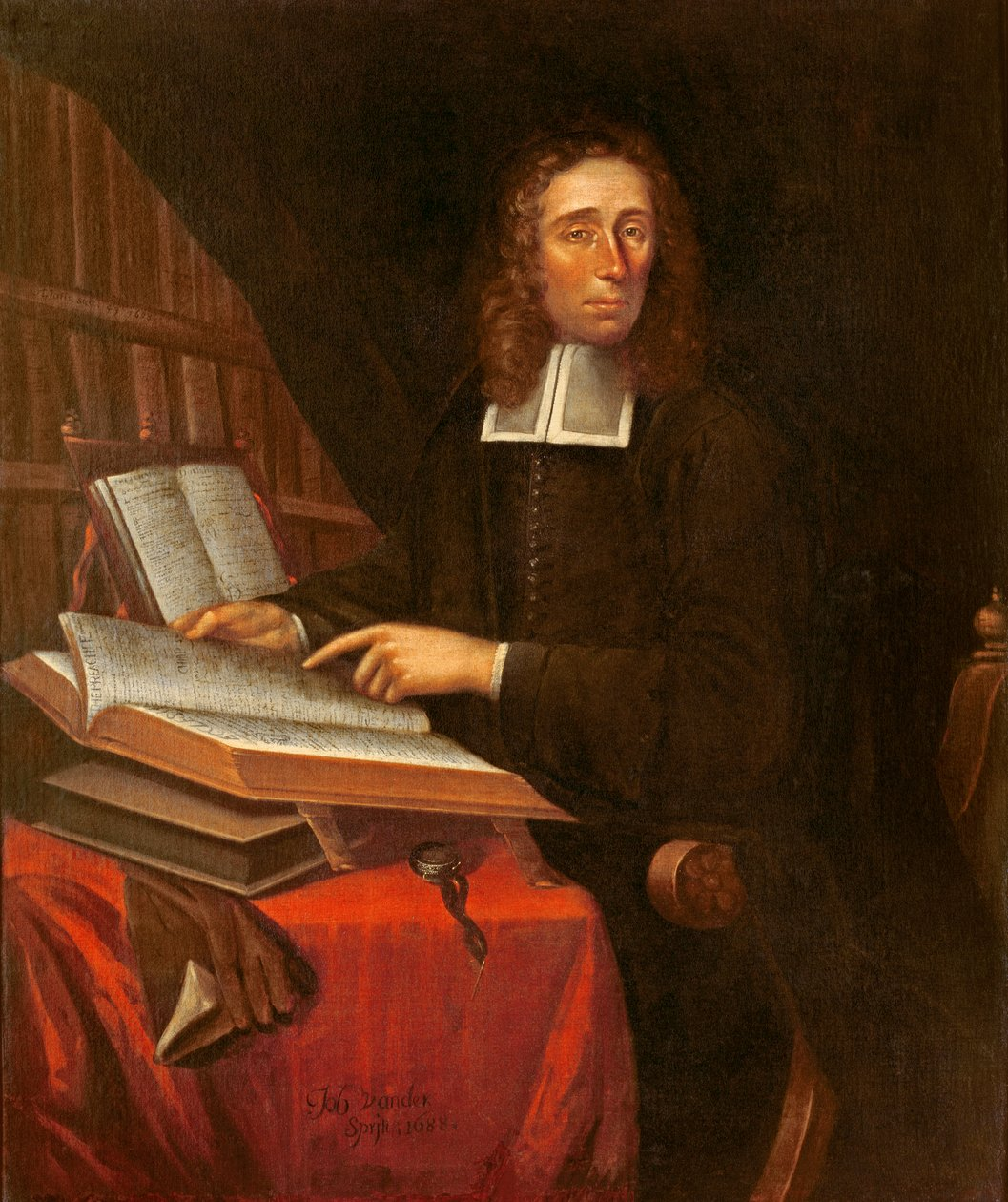
1688 portrait of Increase Mather, the namesake of Mather House, by Joan van der Spriet

Opened in 1970, Mather House is the most recently constructed of Harvard's houses. It takes its name from Increase Mather, a Harvard alumnus and prominent Puritan minister in the Massachusetts Bay Colony who served as the University's president from 1685 to 1692. The architectural firm that designed Mather House, Shepley Bulfinch Richardson and Abbott, is also responsible for the Art Institute of Chicago, the original campus of Stanford University (along with Frederick Law Olmsted), the Ames Building, and the completion of Boston's Trinity Church.

== Social life and the Lather ==
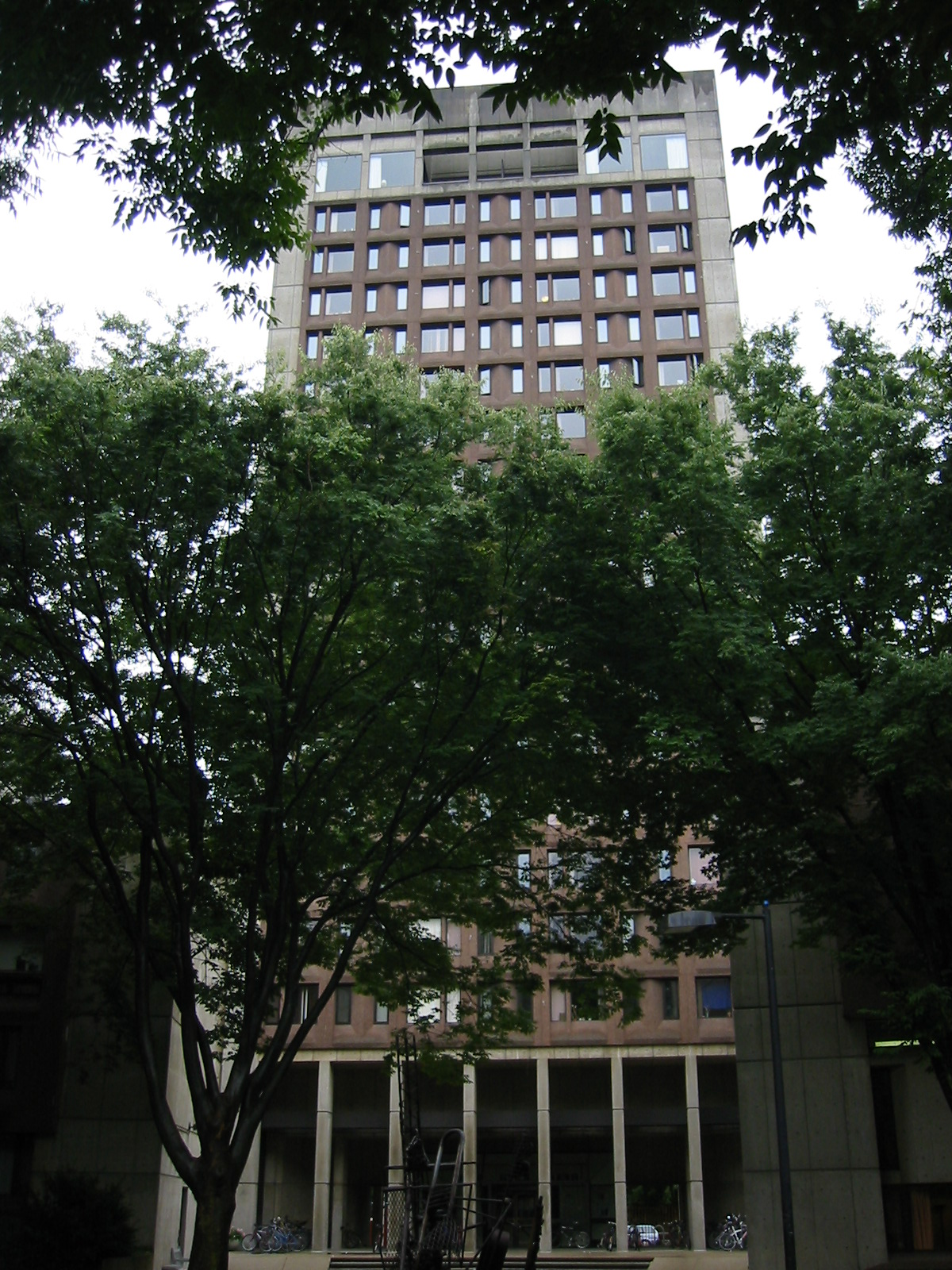
Mather Tower

The open architecture of Mather's common spaces makes it easy to host social events. Mather's Housing Committee hosts happy hours every two weeks. In addition, the House hosts formal dances twice a year, as well as student-faculty dinners once a semester. Most prominent among Mather social gatherings is the Mather Lather, a College-wide foam party that takes place every spring in the dining hall. Since its first run in 2003, the Lather has grown in scope and fame, earning the attention of the Boston media and The New York Times.

The Louie Cup is a year-long Olympics-like tournament of games that takes place in the House. Generally, an event is held every week in which one or more representatives of each team (comprising a group of 4-6, usually roommates) competes. The games include a pancake-eating contest, foosball, a dining hall version of Iron Chef, and hot pepper-eating, as well as a wiffle ball home run derby, ping pong, Wii sports, dodgeball, and boggle. The events are open to the campus but tend to take place in Mather. The tournament is named after Louie's Superette, a convenience store across the street from Mather House, and a large quantity of alcohol is awarded to the winning team at the end of the spring semester.

The house's well-known rivalry with Kirkland House has sparked heated exchanges of practical jokes and pranks. While Mather is generally seen as the instigator and aggressor, the rivalry began when a number of Mather students transferred to Kirkland House.

Mather won the Harvard Green Campus Initiative Green Cup in 2006 and 2011 and the Greenest HoCo award in 2008. Mather House has recently won the Straus Cup in both the 2018-19 and 2019-20 academic years, Harvard's intramural sports championship prize.

== Notable alumni ==
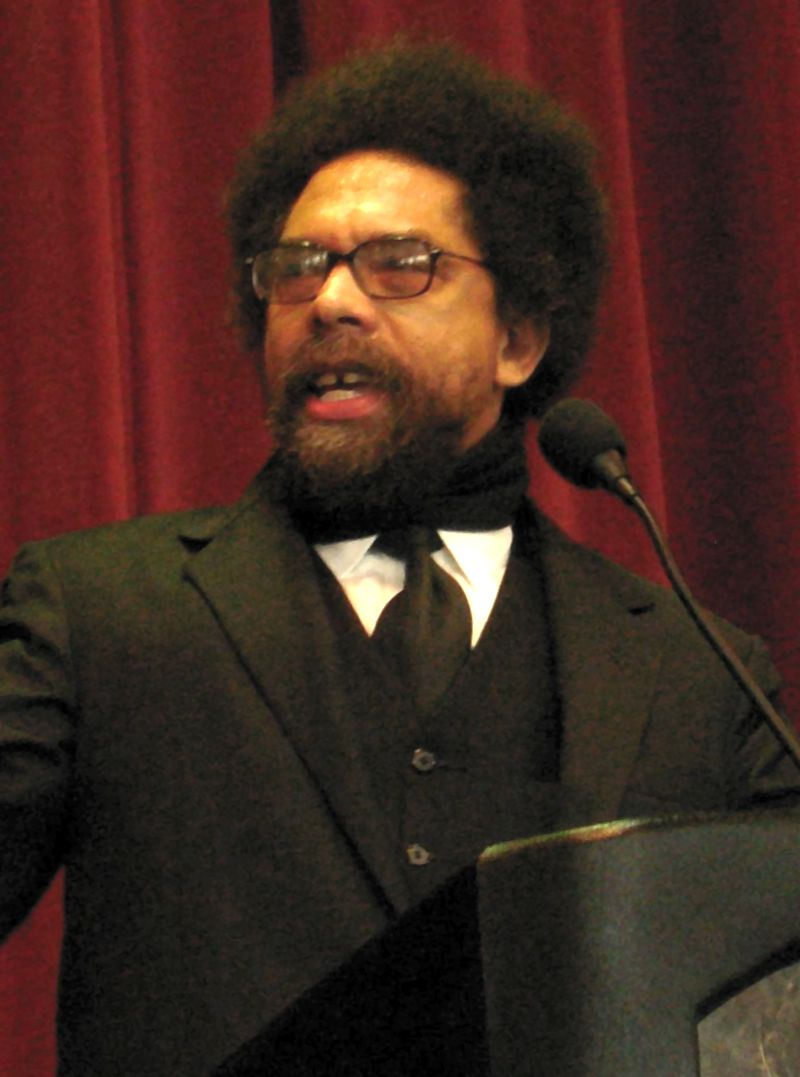
Cornel West

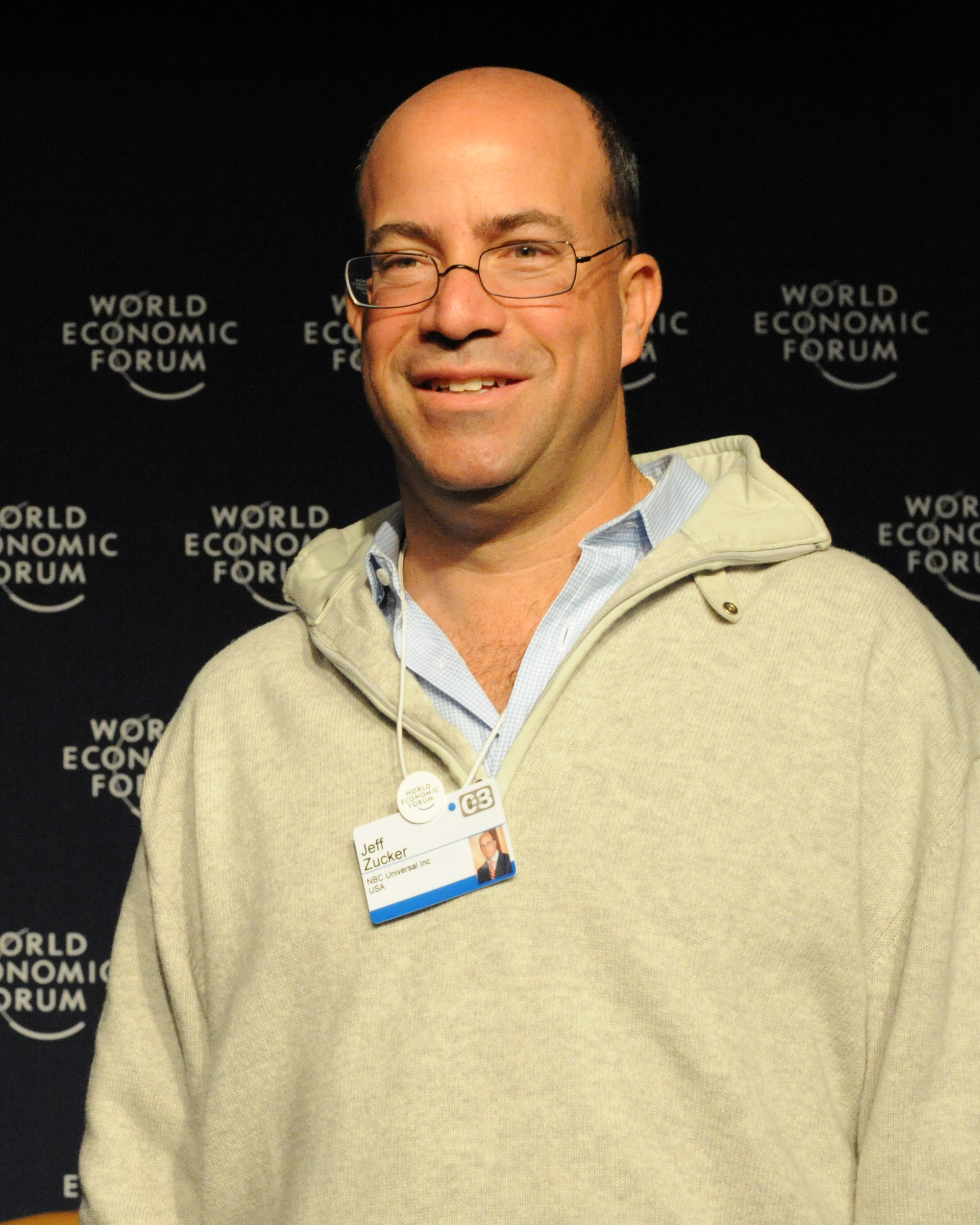
Jeff Zucker

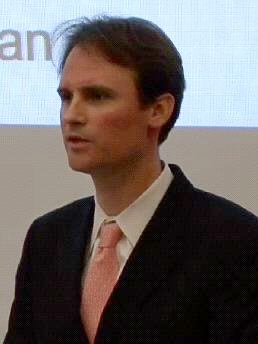
John Palfrey

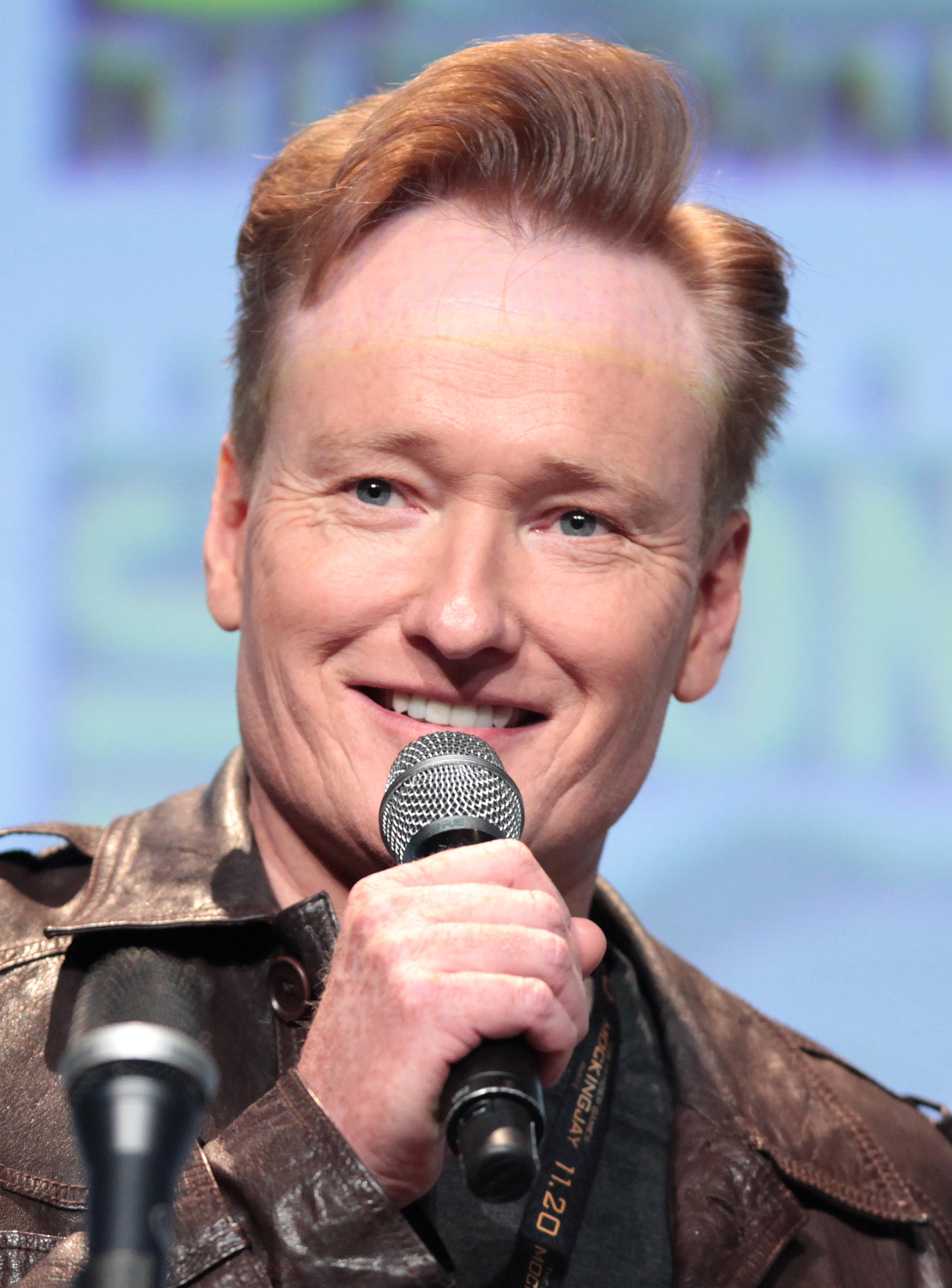
Conan O'Brien

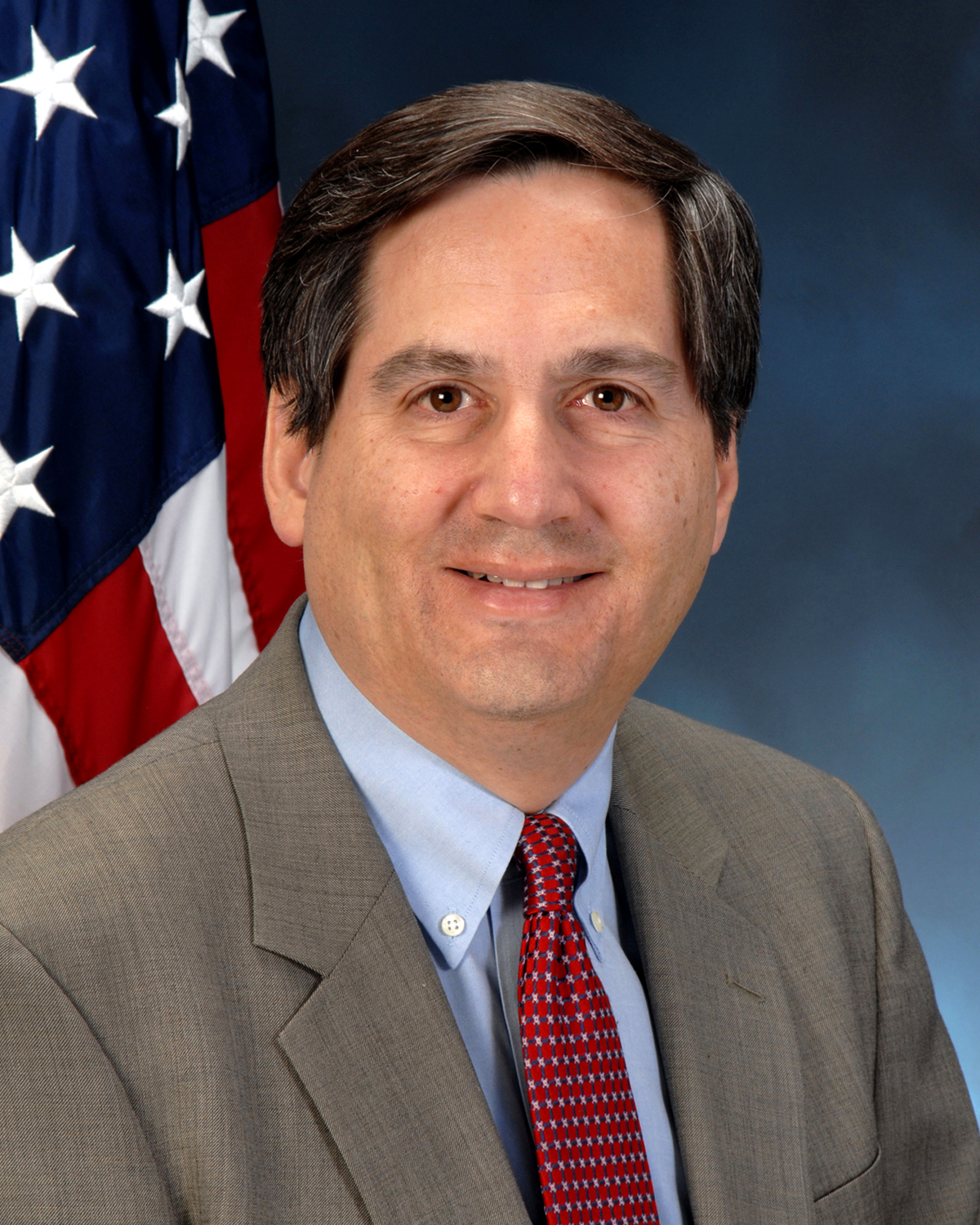
John D. Trasviña

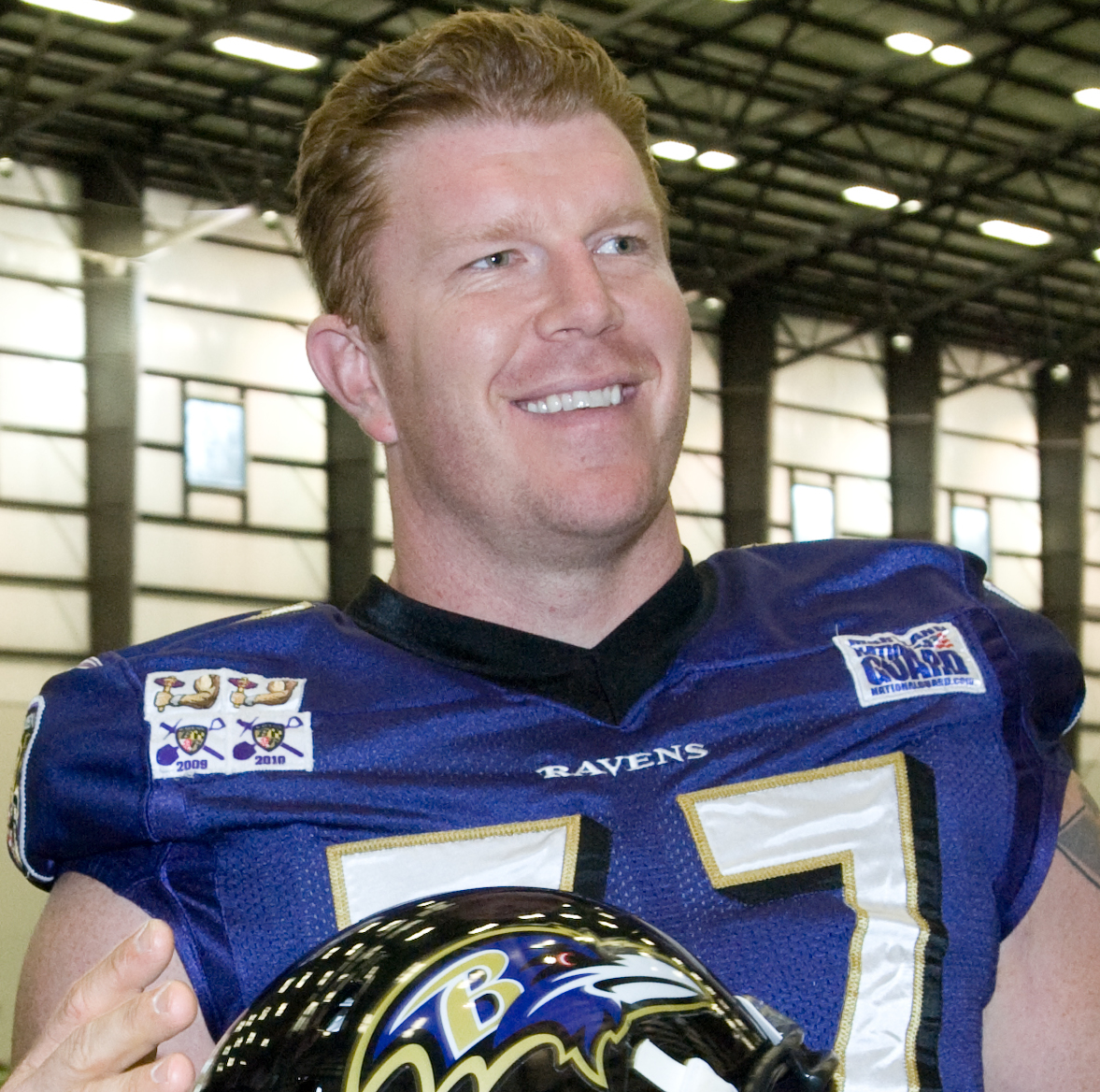
Matt Birk

Other notable alumni include Michael Kinsley, David Laibson, Nicholas Ciarelli, Sarah Haskins, Kimberly Marten, Pablo Hernández Rivera, and Luis Ubiñas.
