= Heraldry of Harvard University =

Official seal of Harvard University

Arms of Harvard University

Versions
- Great Seal
- Armiger: Harvard University
- Adopted: 1643; 383 years ago
- Shield: Gules, three open books Argent, edges, covers, and clasps Or, on the books the letters VE RI TAS Sable.
- Motto: Veritas

Harvard University adopted an official seal soon after it was founded in 1636 and named "Harvard College" in 1638; a variant is still used.

Each school within the university (Harvard College, Harvard Medical School, Harvard Law School, Harvard Extension School, Harvard Graduate School of Arts and Sciences, etc.) has its own distinctive shield as well, as do many other internal administrative units such as the Harvard College residential "Houses" and the Harvard Library. Many extracurricular organizations‍—‌such as clubs, societies, and athletic teams‍—‌also have their own shield, often based on the coat of arms of Harvard itself.

== Harvard University coat of arms ==
=== Description ===
The Harvard University coat of arms, or shield, has a field of the color 'Harvard Crimson'. In the foreground are three open books with the word VERITAS (Latin for 'truth') inscribed across them. The two open books at the top symbolize the Old and New Testaments, reflecting the belief that biblical truth is accessible to all who read the Scriptures. The third book at the bottom was interpreted by Puritans as symbolizing the yet unwritten truths of the future — to be fulfilled with the anticipated second coming of Christ. In some versions of the seal, the third book appears closed — a detail interpreted by some as a symbol of knowledge yet to be revealed.

=== History ===
The Harvard Board of Overseers originally designed the coat of arms during meetings in December 1643 and January 1644. However, the design was forgotten until rediscovered by University President Josiah Quincy and revealed in the bicentennial celebrations of 1836. In 1843, the Harvard Corporation officially adopted it as a seal, and the seal in use today is very similar.

1643 Original Sketch

1885 "Appleton" Design

Present Design

== Faculty of Arts and Sciences (FAS) ==
=== Harvard College ===
Blazon: Arms of Harvard, differenced by a chevron argent between the books.

Each of the residential houses of Harvard College has its own arms, which are used commonly on merchandise, in architectural ornaments, on dining hall china, etc.

Residential Houses of Harvard College
House	Arms	Blazon	Symbolism
Adams House		Or, five sprigs of oak gules in saltire, each with a single leaf and an acorn.	The arms reference the Adams family of Quincy, Massachusetts, who had used an oak leaf logo in several family papers.
Cabot House		Or, three chabots haurient, with dorsaI fins sinister gules.	Canting arms, used by the Cabot family, assumed from the French Chabot family.
Currier House		Gules, in base an apple tree surrounded by a bench or, in chief a barrulet sable engrailed and fimbriated argent.	The apple tree references an apple tree which used to stand in the Radcliffe Yard, and was used as a symbol in a fundraising campaign in 1969 to complete Currier House.
Dunster House		Gules, three facing stags' heads caboched within an orle, all or.	A differenced version of an unrelated Dunster family, on a mistaken attribution by the College of Heralds.
Dudley House		Or, a lion rampant vert armed and langued within a bordure gules.	A differenced version of the arms of Governor Thomas Dudley.
Eliot House		Argent, a fess gules between two bars gemel wavy.	The arms come from a 16th-century adopted arms by the Devonshire Eliots, from whom the Massachusetts Eliot family descended.
Kirkland House		Gules, on a cross sable fimbriated argent, three mullets argent of five points in fess.	Arms of the Kirkland family of Carlisle.
Leverett House		Argent, a chevron between three leverets courant, all sable.	Canting arms—a "leveret" is a young hare—found on the tombs of many of the family: perhaps inherited, perhaps granted by Charles II for service in King Philip's War.
Lowell House		Sable, a hand dexter couped at the wrist and grasping three darts blunted with points down, one in pale, and two in saltire, all argent.	Taken from the genuine arms of the Lowell family, as documented from at least 1563.
Mather House		Ermine, on a fess wavy gules three lions rampant and langued sable.	Probably assumed arms, pace Samuel Mather, of an unrelated William Mather of Shropshire.
Pforzheimer House		Per bend gules and sable; four squares per bend, each divided per bend and countercharged sable and gules.	Preserved temporary arms from "North House", the Pforzheimers having given no arms. Colors represent Harvard and Radcliffe, and the squares the four buildings included. Colors violate heraldic rules.
Quincy House		Gules, seven mascles conjoined, three, three, and one, or.	Probably assumed arms, but found on a silver cup belonging to Edmund Quincy, a second generation settler.
Winthrop House		Argent, three chevronels gules and over them a lion rampant sable armed and langued gules.	Genuine arms of the Winthrop family, brought from England in 1548.

=== John A. Paulson School of Engineering and Applied Sciences (SEAS) ===

The School of Engineering and Applied Science has its roots in the Lawrence Scientific School, which was endowed by Abbott Lawrence. Since its incorporation as a division of the Faculty of Arts and Sciences in 1977, according to Mason Hammond, "it is properly no longer entitled to the use of separate arms." Nevertheless, SEAS continues to use its arms informally.

Blazon: Argent, a cross raguly (or ragged) gules, and a chief of Harvard (see below).

=== Extension School ===

The coat of arms for the Harvard Extension School was approved in 1983. At the top of the shield the three books spelling out Veritas (Latin, "truth") represent graduate education; a similar arrangement is seen on the arms of Harvard's law school, medical school, and other graduate schools. Instead of a straight line separating it from the rest of the shield, as is found in the other schools, a line with six arcs pointing up was used instead. A silver chevron was used to represent undergraduate education, a device used in the shield of Harvard College in the 17th to 19th centuries. Two bushels of wheat are included to represent John Lowell's stipulation that courses should not cost more than two bushels of wheat. A golden lamp symbolizes both learning and the fact that some classes are taught at night.

== Graduate and Professional Schools ==
Diagram showing how most shields were constructed

The shields of each of the graduate and professional schools have a standard chief (or top bar) of Harvard, taken from the University shield, formally blazoned "on a chief gules three open books argent with edges of leaves and covers on the two sides and bottom and clasps or, on the books VE - RI - TAS sable," abbreviated "a chief of Harvard." Most of the arms were designed by Pierre de Chaignon la Rose, an alumnus of Harvard College and expert on heraldry, on commission from the University as part of the preparations for the Tercentenary celebrations in 1936. According to Hammond, "La Rose used as the bases for arms of eight of the remaining ten Graduate Schools arms of families of the founders or benefactors. Only for the Dental School and the then School of Public Administration, later the Kennedy School of Government, did he invent the arms described below. He felt, however, that since the Graduate Schools had long used the ordinary Harvard Arms, he should incorporate in the arms which he designed an upper compartment in red (a chief gules) on which are displayed in a row the three white books bearing the VE - RI - TAS, i.e., a chief of Harvard...according to his practice."

School	Arms	Blazon	Symbolism	Family Arms
Harvard Medical School		Gules, a lion rampant argent, and, sustained by a fillet compony or and azure, a chief of Harvard	Assumed arms of the Warren family, distinguished medical family of Boston, including Joseph Warren, John Warren, John Collins Warren, with chief chequy of three rows, or and azure, reduced to a fillet	
Harvard School of Dental Medicine		Argent, a keep gules, and a chief of Harvard	Canting arms based on Nathan Cooley Keep, founding professor of dentistry	
Harvard Divinity School		Argent, on a chevron azure between three sprigs of holly proper and fruited three wood-pigeons of the field, beaked and legged gules, and a chief of Harvard	Arms of Thomas Hollis, who gave Harvard its first endowed professorship, that of Divinity	
Harvard Law School		A representation of Red plaster throughout proper surmounted by four circular lines issuant from dexter base and four similar lines issuant from sinister base Sable on a Fess enhanced Argent the Letters LEX ET IUSTITIA Sable a chief of Harvard	The circular lines on the Red building represent the boundless opportunities of the discipline of Law	
Harvard Business School		Argent, on a saltire engrailed sable five escallops of the field and a chief of Harvard	Purported arms of the Baker family, for George Fisher Baker, who financed buildings and endowed a Professorship of Business Administration	
Harvard Graduate School of Design		Gules, a fret (or perhaps fretty) argent surmounted by a bend vairy, and, sustained by a fillet compony or and azure, a chief of Harvard	Possibly assumed arms of the Norton family, for Charles Eliot Norton, Professor of Art and instrumental in introducing study of architecture at Harvard. Small band below chief taken from arms of Warren (as with Medical School), for first Dean, Herbert L. Warren	
Harvard T.H. Chan School of Public Health		Argent, on a cross fleury sable five fleur-de-lis or, and a chief of Harvard	Possibly assumed arms of Walcott family, for Henry P. Walcott, Overseer, Fellow, and Acting President, important figure in public health in Massachusetts	
Harvard Graduate School of Education		Per bend dancetty argent and azure, three pierced cinquefoils counter-charged, two in chief and one in base, and a chief of Harvard	Assumed arms of Cheever family, for Ezekiel Cheever, "patron saint" of secondary education in New England	
Harvard Kennedy School		Thirteen bars, argent and gules, and a chief of Harvard	Based on the Flag of the United States	

== Radcliffe Arms ==
Year	Arms	Blazon	Symbolism
1895		Gules, chaveron sable between three mullets argent of five points; impaled with a shield argent, two bendlets engrailed sable.	Combination of arms of Sir. Thomas Mowlson and Ann Radcliffe.
1936		Argent two bendlets engrailed Sable a bordure Gules.	
2021		Argent two bendlets Sable a bordure Gules.	

== Other arms ==
Other arms of Harvard departments and groups
Department	Arms	Blazon	Symbolism	Family Arms
Harvard Crimson (Athletics)		Gules, charged in the fess point with a letter H within a bordure argent		
Harvard Faculty Club		Ermine, charged in the fess point with a lion's head erased proper, langued gules, and collared or and a chief of Harvard dancetty	Possibly assumed arms of Burr family of Dorchester, for Allston Burr, the Club's first benefactor	
Harvard University Health Services		Ermine, a chief gules bearing three lions rampant argent and below a pale gules bearing a caduceus argent	Based on arms of Oliver family, for Henry Kemble Oliver, who endowed a Professorship and a Department of Hygiene, which became the Health Services	
Memorial Church of Harvard University		Blue celeste, an eagle displayed with wings inverted or, armed gules, holding an open book argent with covers gules; impaled with a shield argent, a fess sable between three apples gules palewise inverted leaved and stemmed proper, two in chief and one in base; over all, a chief of Harvard	Right (sinister) arms are the canting arms of the Appleton family, for Samuel Appleton, who funded the construction of the Appleton Chapel, the original chapel which was torn down and replaced by the Memorial Church. Left (dexter) arms feature traditional symbols of the Church.	

Former arms
School/Department	Arms	Blazon	Symbolism	Notes
Harvard Law School		Azure, three wheat sheaves or, two in chief and one in base, and a chief of Harvard	Incorporates the arms of Isaac Royall Jr., who endowed the first Professorship of Law	The arms were replaced in 2016, due to Royall's wealth from slavery in Antigua

== See also ==
- Heraldry of Columbia University
- Coat of arms of Yale University

== Sources ==
- Hammond, Mason (July 1981). "A Harvard Armory: Part I". Harvard Library Bulletin. XXIX (3): 261–297.
- Hammond, Mason (October 1981). "A Harvard Armory: Part II". Harvard Library Bulletin. XXIX (4): 361–402.
- Hammond, Mason (Summer 1986). "A Harvard Armory: Part III". Harvard Library Bulletin. XXXIV (3): 251–293.
- Hammond, Mason (Summer 1987). "Official Terms in Latin and English for Harvard College or University". Harvard Library Bulletin. XXXV (3): 294–310.
- Harvard University. Corporation. Seals, 1650-[1926]. UAI 15.1310, Harvard University Archives.
- Morison, Samuel Eliot (September 1933). "Harvard Seals and Arms". Harvard Graduates' Magazine. 42.
- Morison, Samuel Eliot (1936), Harvard College in the Seventeenth Century. Part I, p. 11
- Morison, Samuel Eliot (1995), The Founding of Harvard College, pp. 3, 193, 325, 328–30
- Rosenmeier, Jesper (January 1968). "Veritas: The Sealing of the Promise". Harvard Library Bulletin. XVI (1): 26–37.
- Spindle, Robert B. (May–June 1996). "02138. Arms and the (10,000) men". Harvard Magazine. Vol. 98, no. 5. Letter to the editor.
- Bethell, John T. (March–April 1996). "Variations on a Theme". Harvard Magazine. Vol. 98, no. 4.
- Williams, George Huntston (2014). Divinings: Religion at Harvard: From Its Origins in New England Ecclesiastical History to the 175th Anniversary of The Harvard Divinity School, 1636–1992. Vandenhoeck & Ruprecht. p. 82. ISBN 978-3-525-55056-4.
