= Currier House (Harvard College) =

Residential House of Harvard College

- Residential House at Harvard University
- Harvard University
- Shield
- Location: 64 Linnaean Street
- Coordinates: 42°22′54.09″N 71°07′32.78″W
- Motto: Timete Arborem (Latin)
- Motto in English: Fear The Tree
- Established: 1970
- Named for: Audrey Bruce Currier
- Colours: Green, red, and black
- Sister college: Ezra Stiles College
- Faculty Deans: Latanya Sweeney and Sylvia Barrett
- Undergraduates: 360
- Called: Currierites
- Website: currier.harvard.edu

Currier House is one of twelve undergraduate residential Houses of Harvard College, in Cambridge, Massachusetts, United States. Opened in September 1970, it is named after Audrey Bruce Currier, a member of the Radcliffe College Class of 1956 who, along with her husband, was killed in a plane crash in 1967. The area was formerly used as housing for Radcliffe College, and as such the four towers of Currier House are named for distinguished alumnae of Radcliffe, including the author Barbara Tuchman. Along with Cabot House and Pforzheimer House, Currier is part of the former Radcliffe Quadrangle, known colloquially as simply "the Quad."

== Building ==
Currier House consists of four towers containing mostly single rooms adjoined by a sink room or bathroom. Currier also has some coveted living arrangements, including the "Ten-Man," which is a suite of ten singles and three full bathrooms arranged around Harvard's largest common room, and three penthouse suites nicknamed "Solarium rooms." In 2005, Currier renovated a common space known as the "Fishbowl" to set up an entertainment center with a big screen projector and surround sound system.

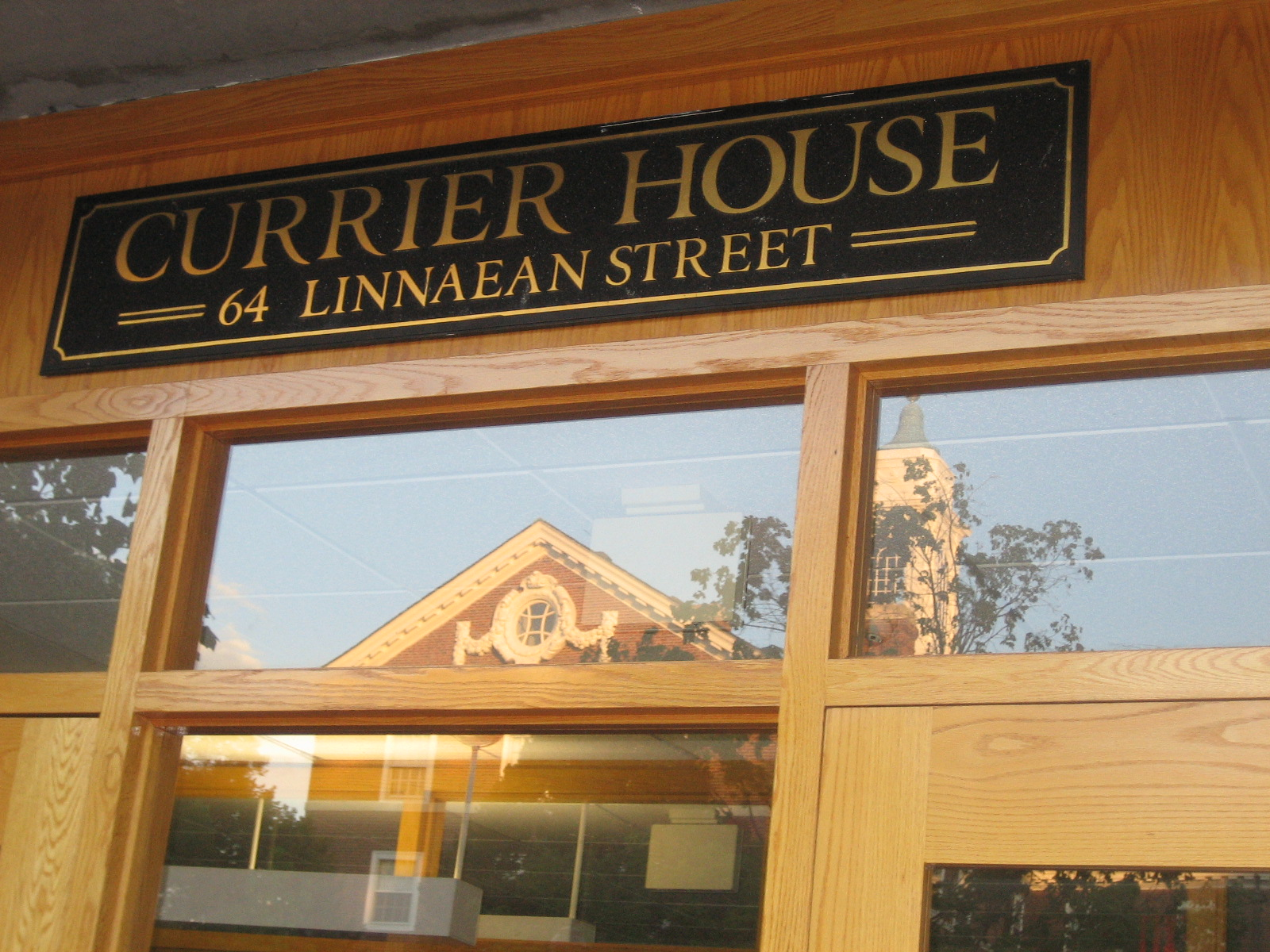
Currier House entrance

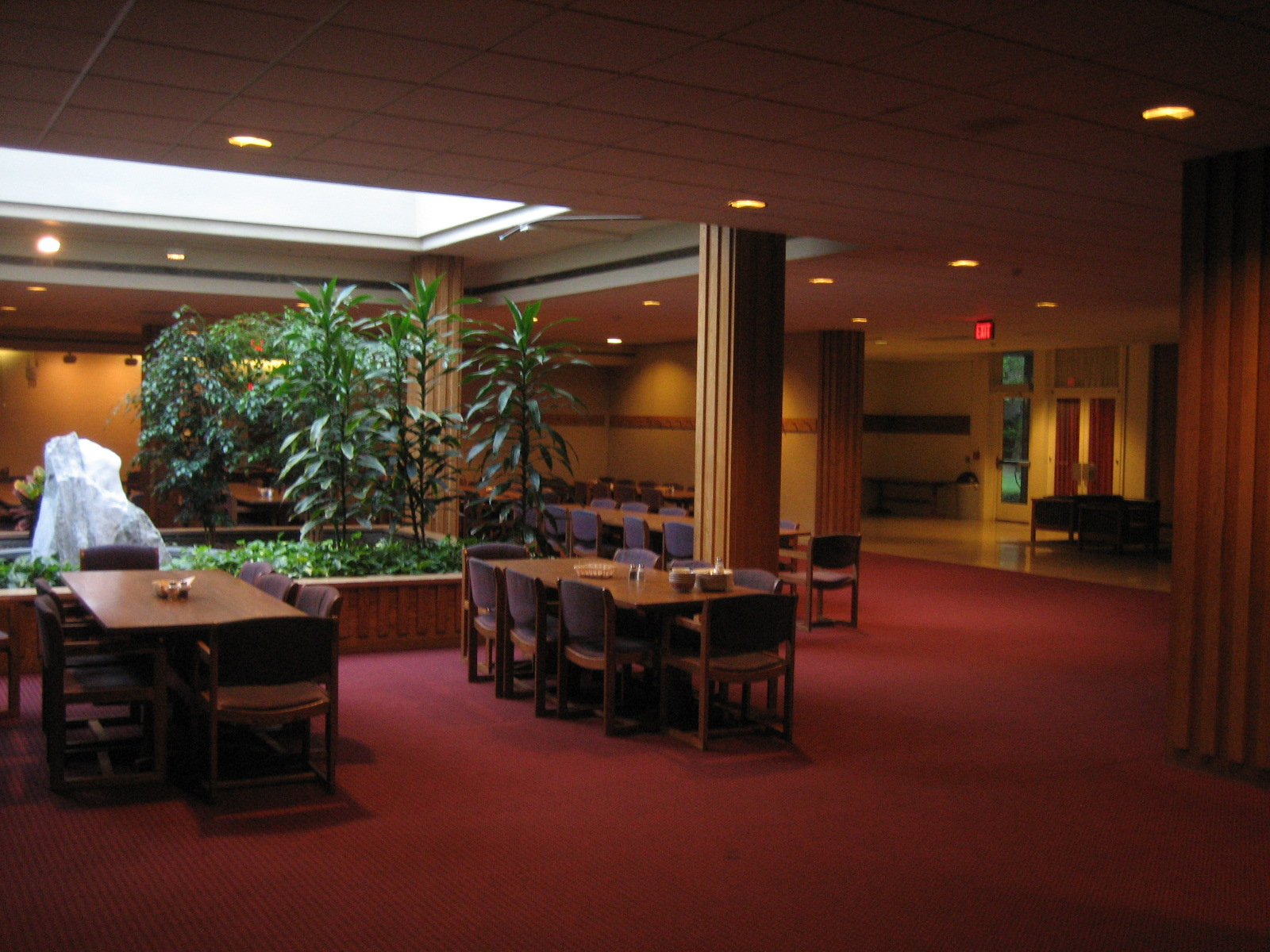
Currier dining hall with its stone fountain

== Faculty Deans and Resident Dean ==
The current Faculty Deans are Latanya Sweeney and Sylvia Barrett. The Allston Burr Resident Dean is Laura Johnson. Previous deans have included scholar of Islam and former Dean of Harvard Divinity School William A. Graham, chemist and Nobel laureate Dudley R. Herschbach, classicist Gregory Nagy, and historian of science Barbara Gutmann Rosenkrantz.

== Athletic success ==
In 2004–2005, Currier House won the Straus Cup for the first time in over twenty years. The cup is given to the house that scores the most points in intramural athletic competition during the school year.

== Student government ==
Student government in Currier House consists of the Currier House Committee, of which all house residents are members. The committee operates separately from the Harvard Undergraduate Council (UC), to organize student events and manage funding. The Currier HoCo, like student government organizations in the other Houses, is funded by the UC and maintained by an executive council run by students in leadership positions. Elections for the two Chair positions and the other social organization positions are held each January during the Super Bowl Halftime show, which is broadcast in the Fishbowl common space. The two HoCo co-chairs are Jacob Miller and Annie Garofalo.

== Famous alumni ==
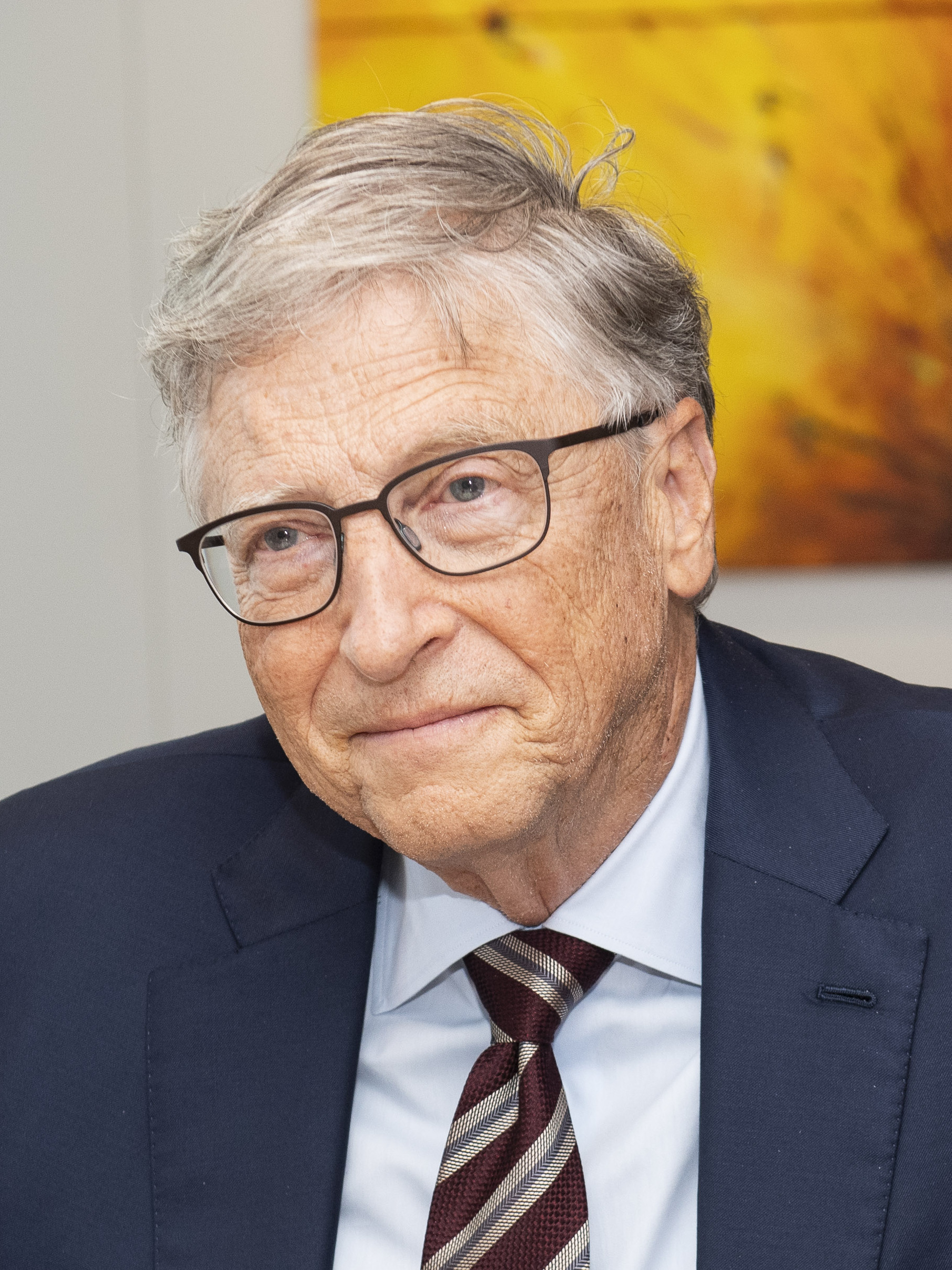
Bill Gates

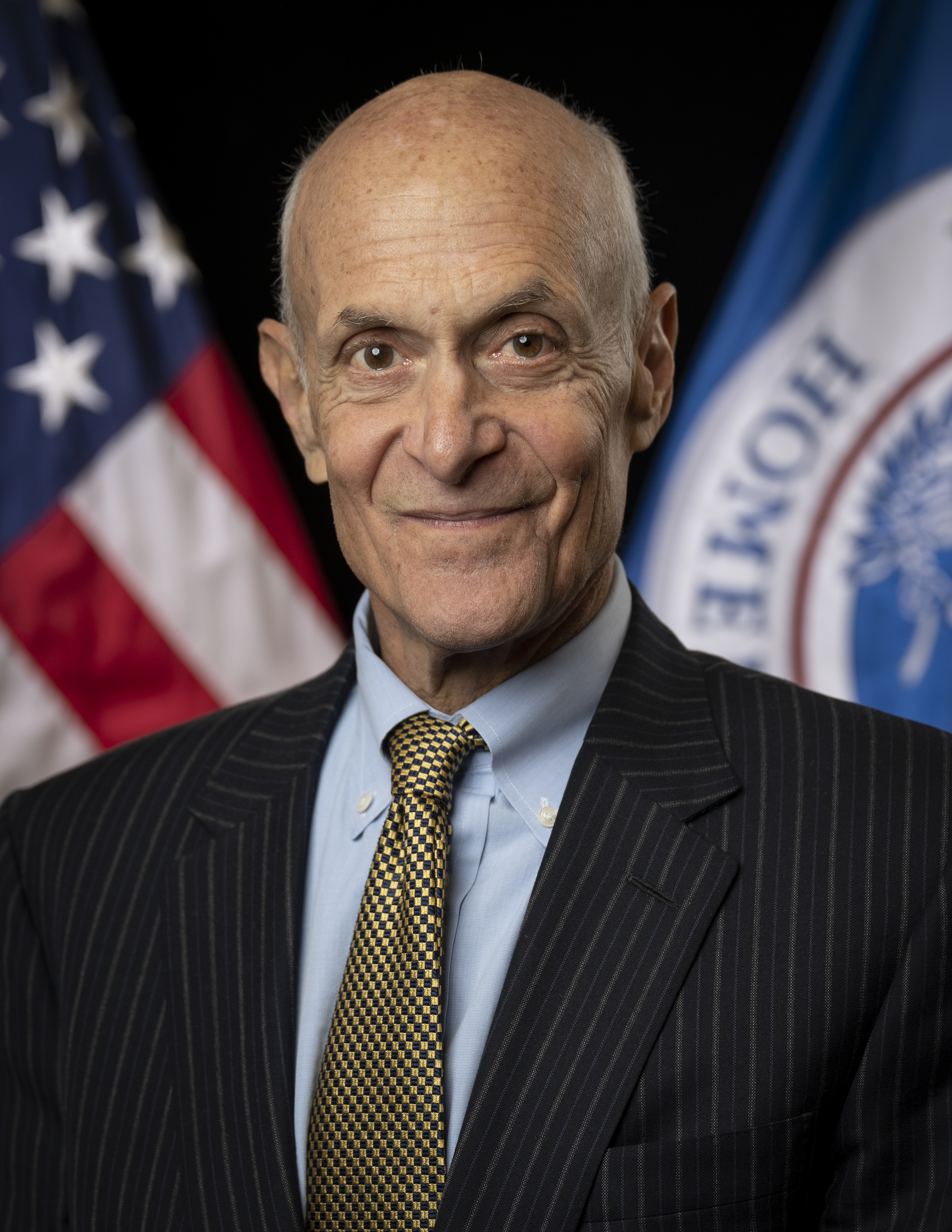
Michael Chertoff

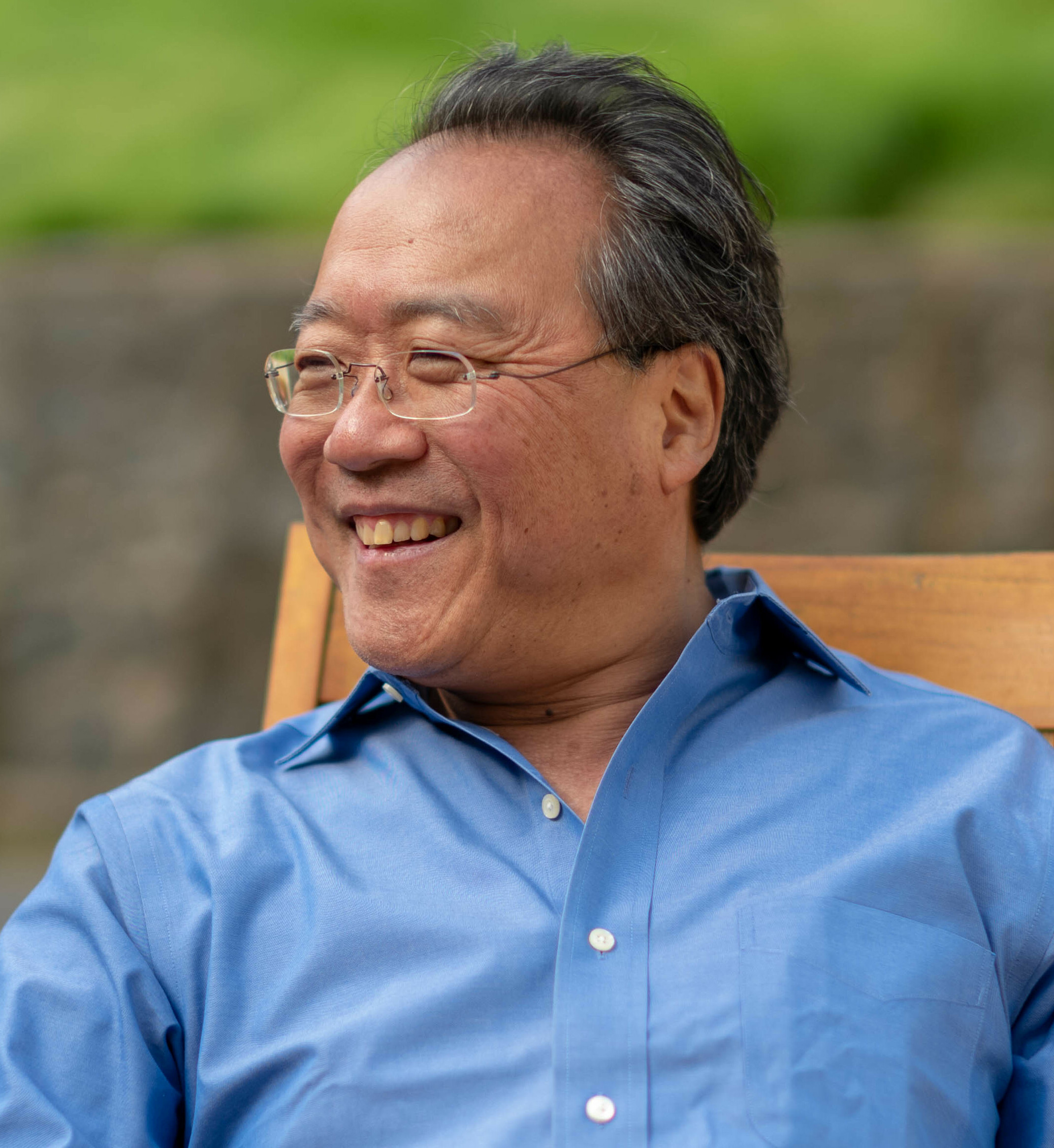
Yo-Yo Ma

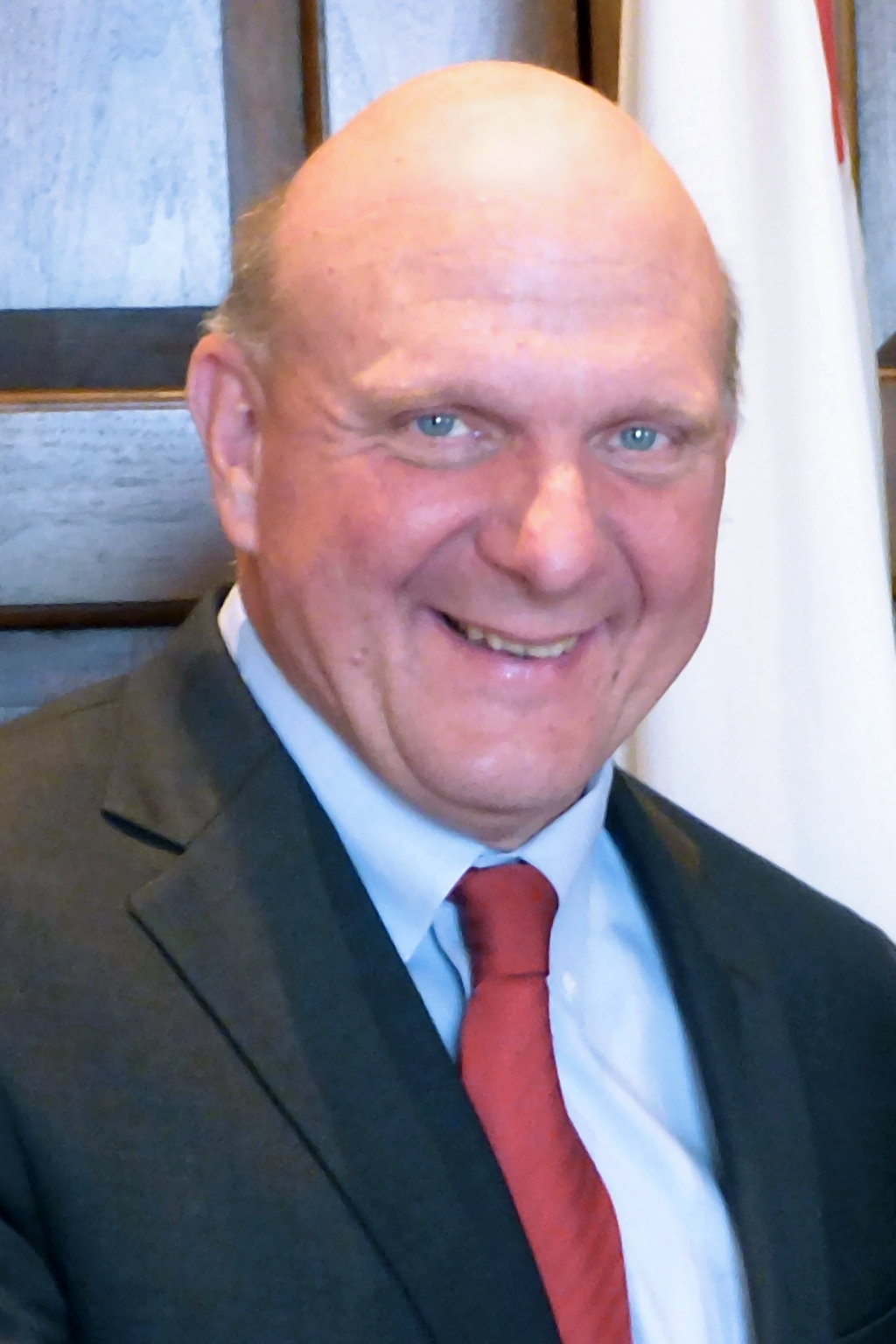
Steve Ballmer

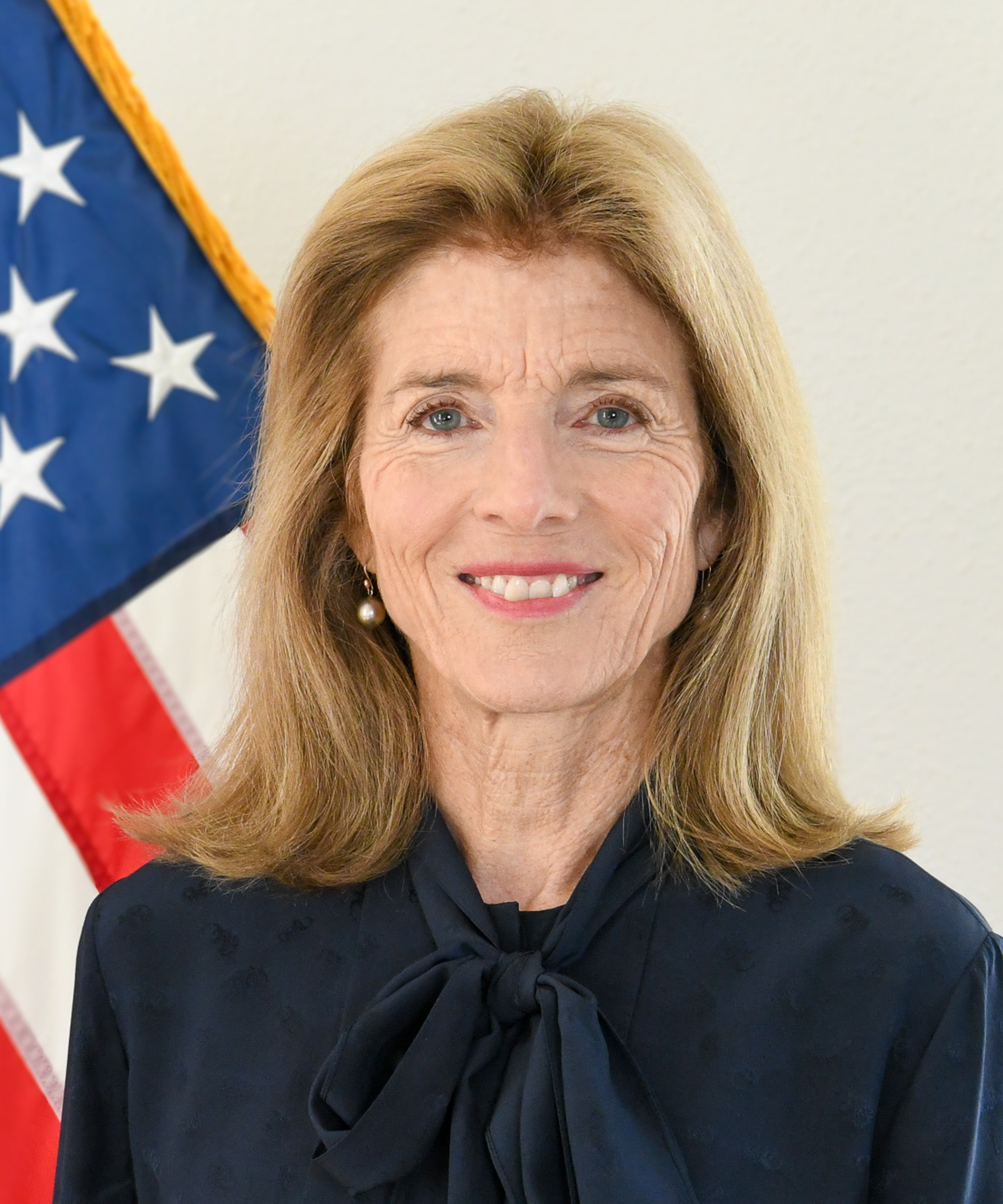
Caroline Kennedy

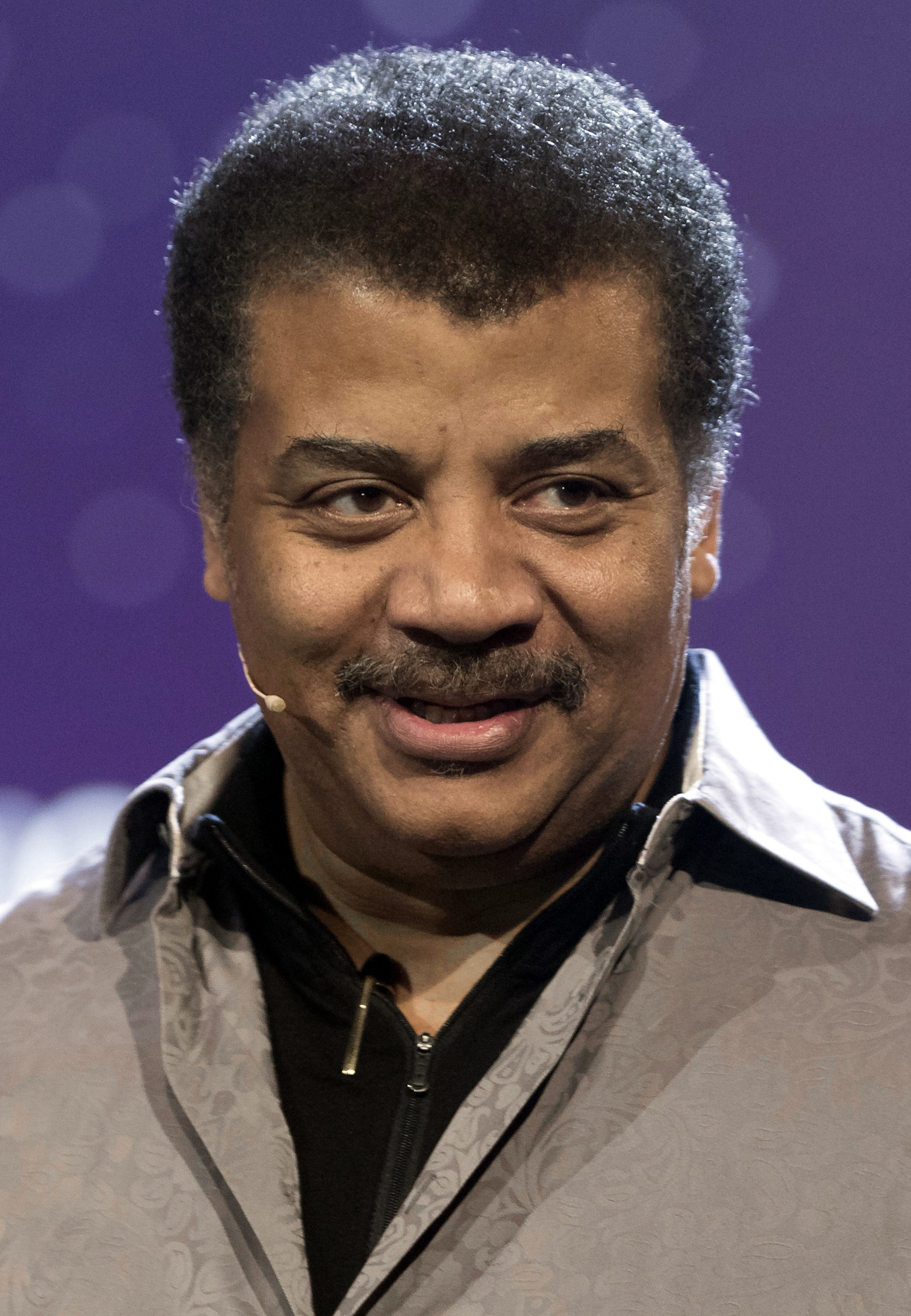
Neil deGrasse Tyson

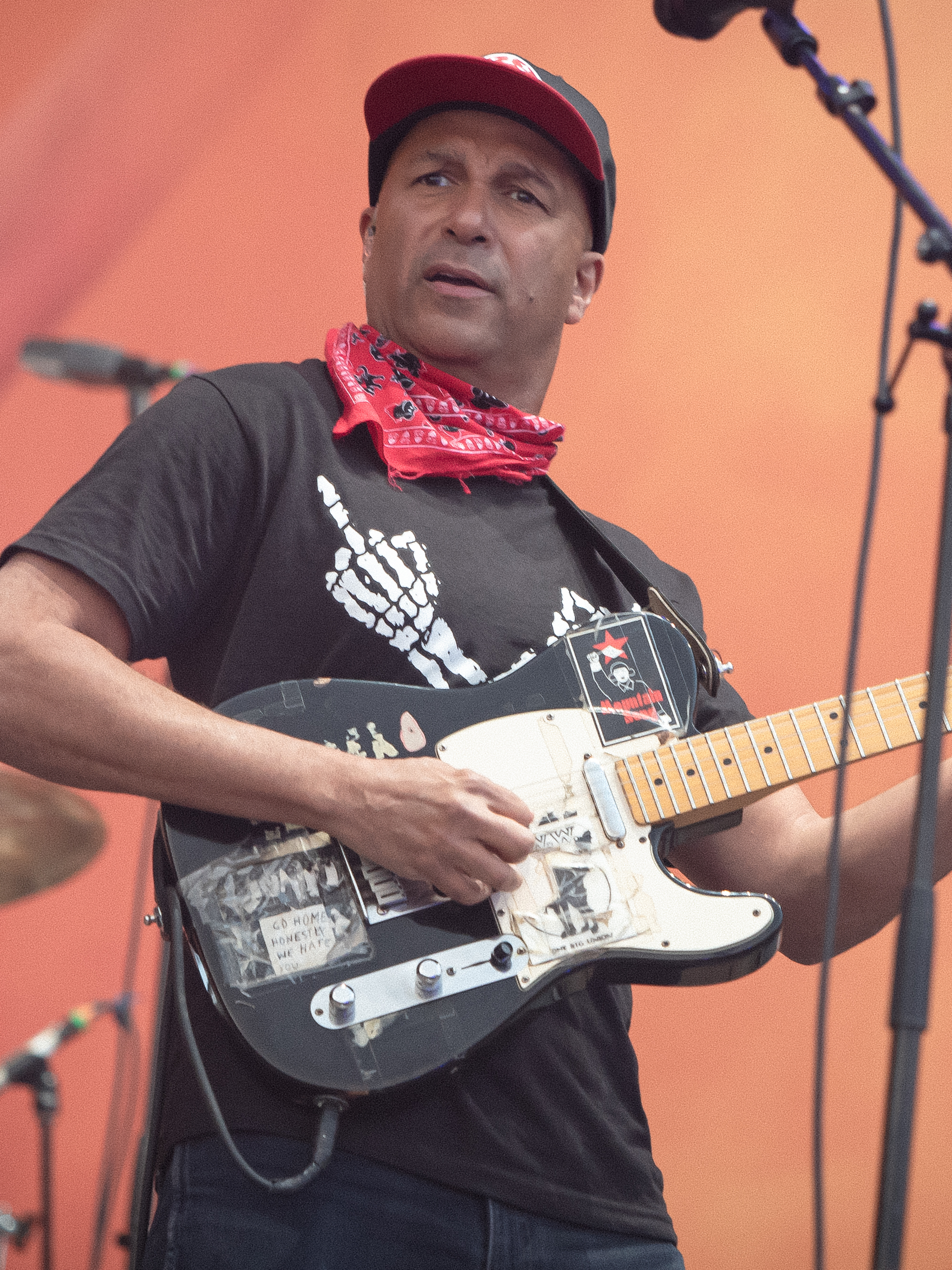
Tom Morello

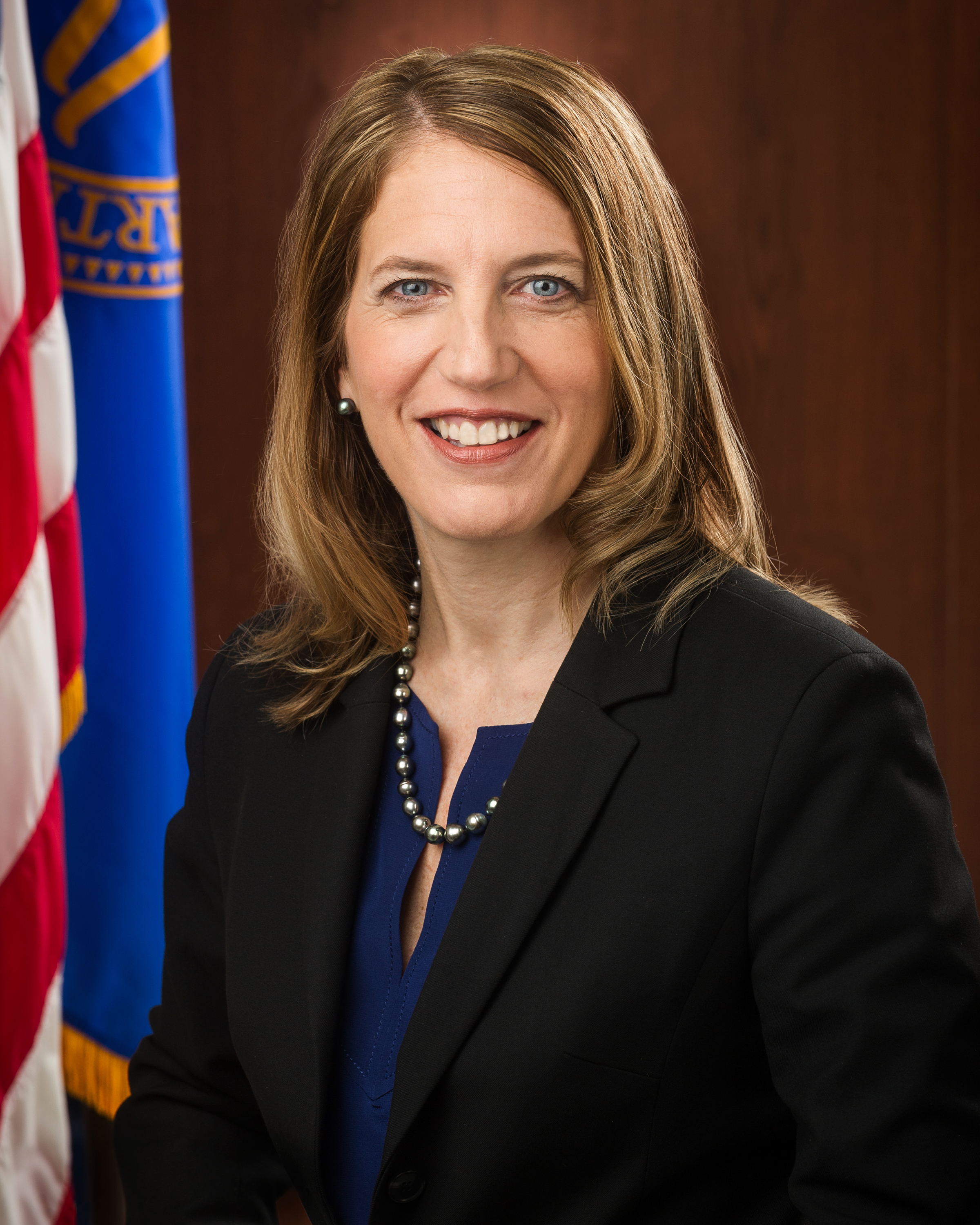
Sylvia Mathews Burwell

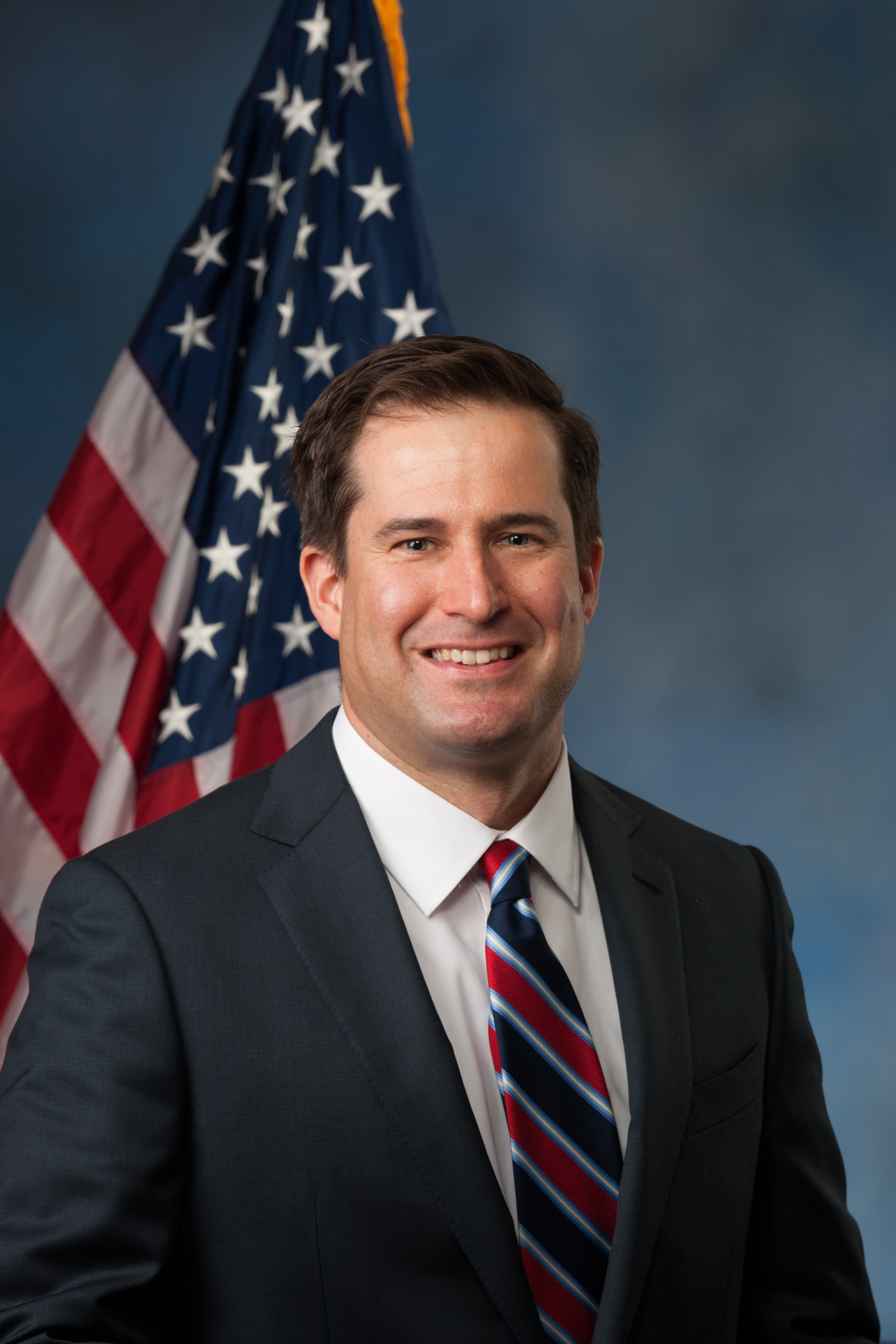
Seth Moulton

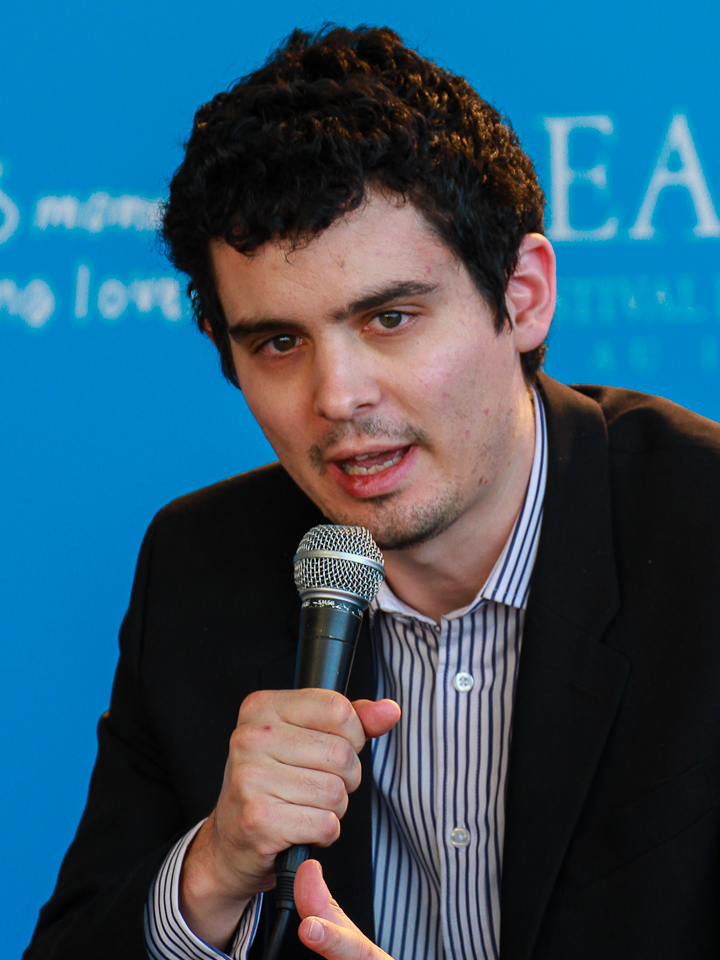
Damien Chazelle

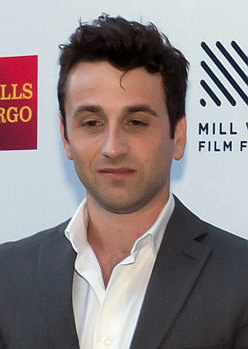
Justin Hurwitz

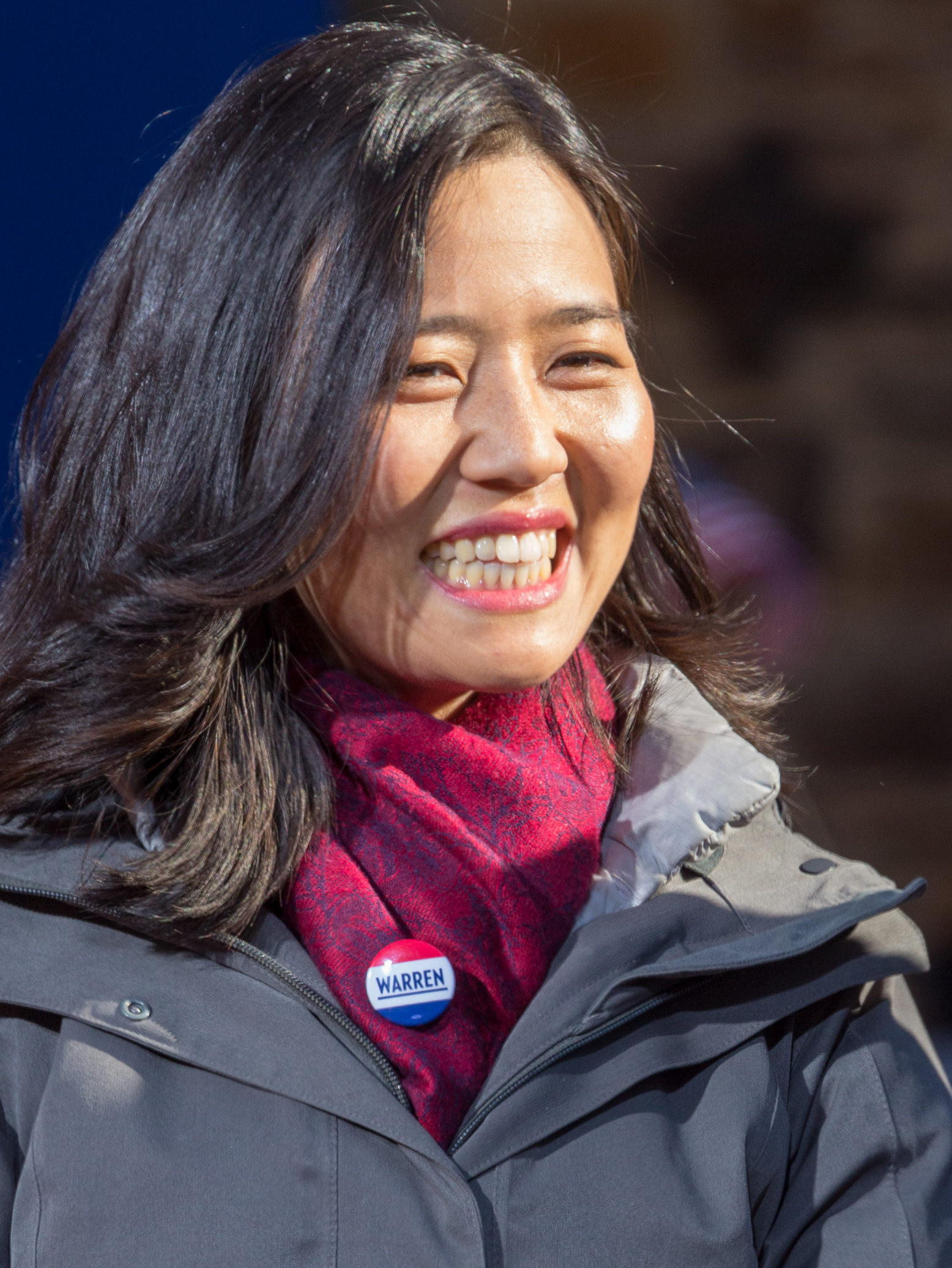
Michelle Wu

Gates and Ballmer met in Currier House, where the two lived on the same floor, and formed a friendship that later led Gates to recruit his college friend to join his budding software company. Gates also described during his 2007 commencement address at Harvard how he initiated one of his first software deals while making a call from his room in Currier House.
