= Pforzheimer House =

Residential House of Harvard College

- Residential House at Harvard University
- Harvard University
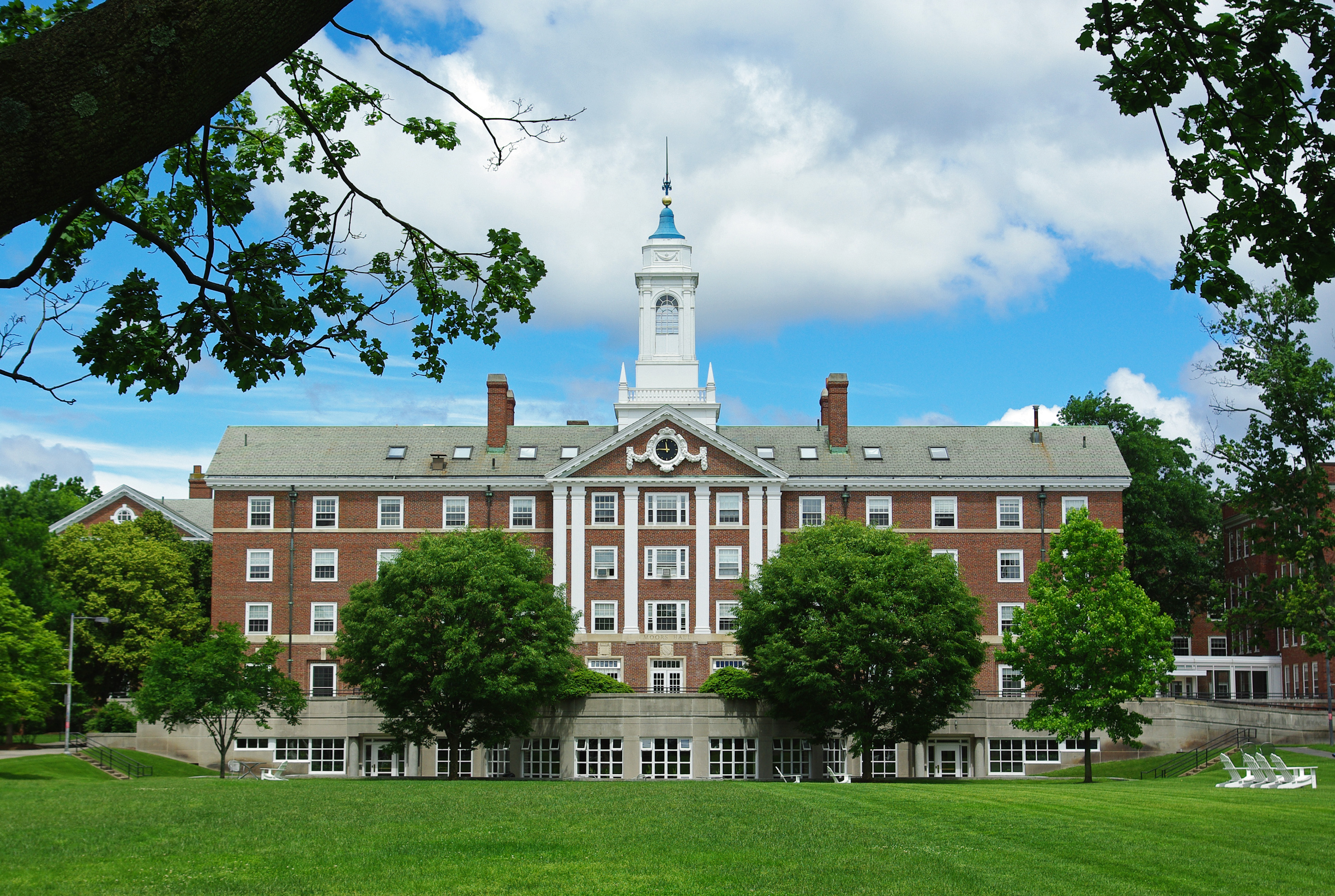
- View of Pforzheimer House's Moors Hall.

- Shield
- Location: 56 Linnaean Street
- Coordinates: 42°22′55″N 71°07′29″W
- Motto: Latin: Fortes Fortuna Adiuvat (sometimes stylized as "pFortes pFortuna Adiuvat")
- Established: 1970 (as North House)
- Named for: Carol K. and Carl H. Pforzheimer Jr.
- Former names: North House, Radcliffe Quadrangle
- Colours: Red, Black, White
- Faculty Deans: Erica Chenoweth; Zoe Marks
- Undergraduates: approx. 400
- Called: Pfohosers, Pfohomies, Pfohoes
- Website: pfoho.harvard.edu

Pforzheimer House, nicknamed Pfoho (FOE-hoe) and formerly named North House, is one of twelve undergraduate residential Houses at Harvard University. It was named in 1995 for Carol K. and Carl Howard Pforzheimer Jr, major University and Radcliffe College benefactors, and their family.

Located in the Radcliffe Quadrangle, Pforzheimer House comprises Ada Louise Comstock, Daniel Henry Holmes, Mary Buckminster Moors, and Wolbach Halls, in addition to Faculty Row and the Jordan North and South buildings. Pforzheimer is known for having strong house community and one of the highest transfer-in rates of any Harvard House.

Pforzheimer House's shield features black and crimson squares on a crimson and black field; its mascot is the polar bear. The current faculty deans are Erica Chenoweth and Zoe Marks.

== History ==
=== Early years ===
Radcliffe College students first took up residence on campus in 1901, and the oldest parts of Pforzheimer House date to that year.

Moors opened in time for the 1949–50 academic year, the year plans for Holmes were first drawn up. Construction of Comstock began in 1957.

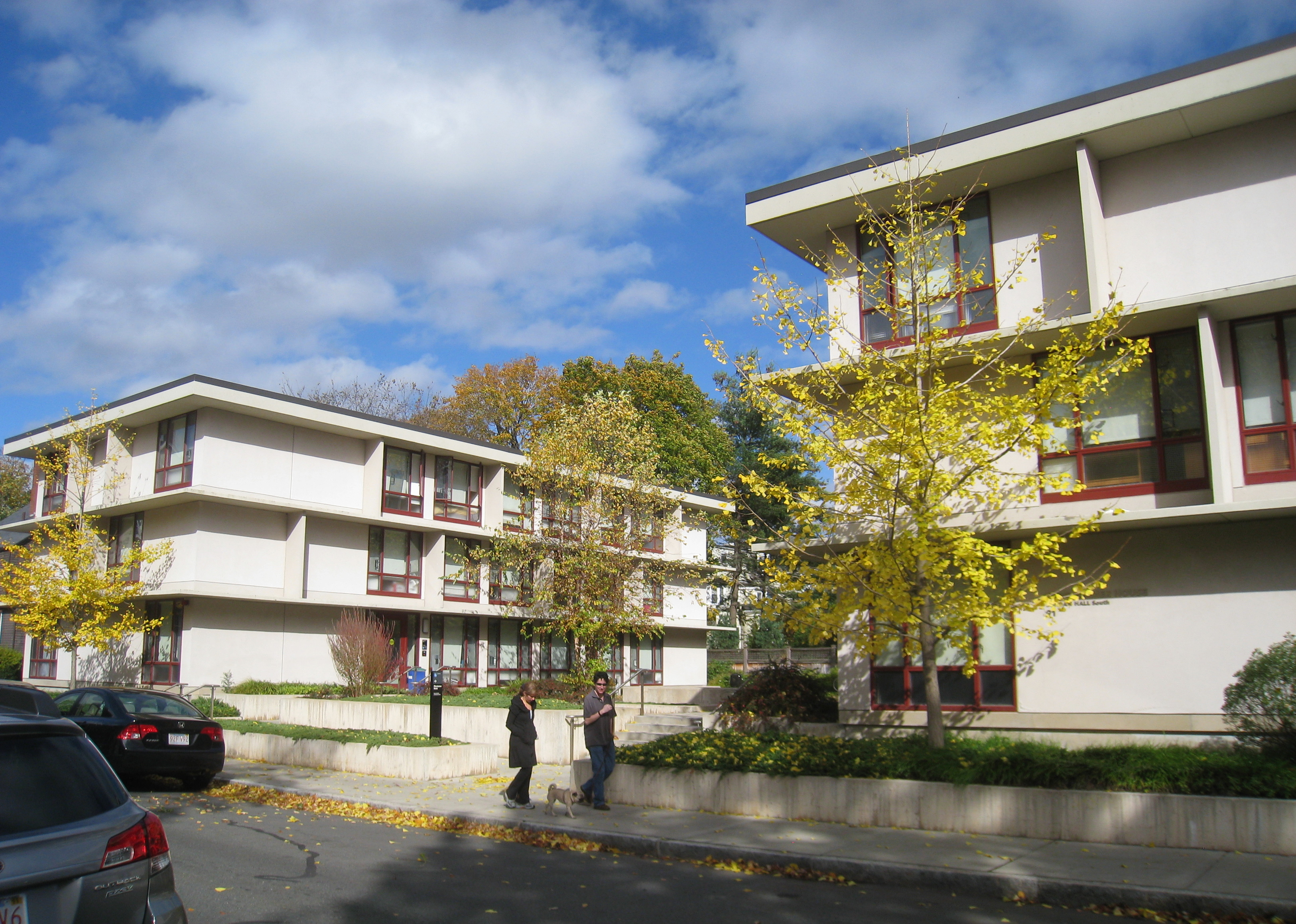
Jordan North and Jordan South

The Jordans, two separate buildings located at the corner of Walker and Shepard Streets, began as an experiment in cooperative living in 1961. They gradually became used as overflow housing in 1985, although one building persisted as a co-op until at least until 1997.

Wolbach, formerly an apartment building, was purchased by Radcliffe in 1964.

=== North House ===
The name "North House" first appeared in 1961 and consisted of Comstock, Moors, and Holmes. Wolbach did not yet belong to Radcliffe at this point. The Jordans were initially assigned to the no-longer-extant East House.

In the fall of 1970, Professor Edward L. Keenan and his wife Joan became the first masters of North House. They moved into the newly constructed masters residence at 46 Linnaean Street. The townhouses of Faculty Row along Linnaean were also completed in 1970 and were affiliated with the House.

Male students were first assigned to North House in the fall of 1970, when Harvard and Radcliffe entered an agreement allowing students from the respective colleges to live in dormitories at the other institution.

House Master and Co-Master Woody and Hanna Hastings began their term in 1975.

=== Major renovations of 1986, 1988, and 2002 ===
They attempted to cultivate house spirit by integrating and interconnecting the buildings. Woody Hastings remarked, "Any student in North House ought to be able to get from any place in the House to any other place in the House in his PJs - or less."

Accordingly, when plans were drawn up for a major renovation in the mid-1980s, the Hastings rejected an early proposal that would have segmented the house into disconnected vertical "entryways", opting instead for a plan that connected "the bricks" to one another more closely and in the process allowed the construction of the Holmes junior common room, the house grille, the Comstock Library, and the centralized balconied dining hall. The duplex suites on the top floors of "the bricks" were also created during this renovation.

Until a major renovation in 2002, Wolbach Hall consisted of one and two bedroom apartments, complete with kitchens. Renovations to Wolbach were done in order to increase the number of students housed in the dorm and to provide suites on campus accessible and appropriate to disabled persons.

A breezeway connecting Wolbach to Moors, long advocated by Hastings, was constructed in 2002.

=== Renaming to Pforzheimer ===
In 1995, North House was renamed Pforzheimer House. A Boston Globe columnist referred to this as "the Pforzheimer House flap," saying that "Harvard renamed the Radcliffe-owned house after a loyal donor without consulting [Radcliffe President Linda] Wilson & Co." The Harvard Noteables wrote five song parodies lamenting the name change.

North House Masters J. Woodland Hastings and Hanna Hastings said they were "thrilled!" with the new name and Hanna was quoted as saying "It's just what we've been asking for. We wanted to be more than a direction." Pretty quickly, students grew used to the new name. The letters f or ph were replaced by pF in House-related words, hence Pformal, PfoHo Pfora, and Pfreshman Welcome.

In 1996, the House welcomed new masters, the McCarthys, to go with its new name. A central common room in Moors was named for the Hastings upon their retirement. That same year, the New York Times noted that, "many black and Hispanic students lived in the Radcliffe quadrangle, in the Pforzheimer House", while the Boston Globe observed that "Pforzheimer, formerly North House, [had] evolved into a base for black student activism and a mecca for premeds" and observed that "the distinct cultures" of the residence halls was about to be broken up by the then-new policy of assigning students randomly to residence halls.

Thirteen members of the Pforzheimer family have attended Harvard and Radcliffe over four generations. They are generally regarded as philanthropic leaders and actively involved alumni, with both Carl H. Pforzheimer, Jr. (AB '28, MBA '30) and Carl H. Pforzheimer III (AB '58, MBA '63) serving as president of the HAA (Harvard Alumni Association), and, along with Carol Koehler Pforzheimer (AB '31) and Nancy Pforzheimer Aronson (AB '56), they worked on numerous graduate school and Radcliffe committees. In addition, the Pforzheimers were the first Harvard–Radcliffe couple to win Harvard Medals for their service to the University.

=== Dispute with Adams House on dining access (Pforzheimer–Adams War) ===
In October 1999, Adams House began enforcing a long-standing policy of closing its dining hall to non-residents during peak hours. Since Adams House is located closest to the main class buildings at Harvard Yard, their dining hall is often crowded, and residents unable to find a seat. Residents of Adams House enacted a series of measures to keep members of other houses out. The most infamous was "The No Interhouse Gong Show," wherein Adams House members rang a gong when nonresidents came in. A running tally of the number of nonresidents attempting to eat in Adams was kept on a large chalkboard.

Pforzheimer House, furthest from the main class buildings, was particularly inconvenienced by this policy. They responded by attempting to pass in House Committee a tongue-in-cheek, non-binding measure (proposed by Rick Wedell '01) denying Adams house residents access to the Pforzheimer dining hall. However, there was no real support for the measure and it did not pass, though the attempt was reported in the Crimson. Adams House residents discovered the proposal, and retaliated by declaring war in their House Committee. The initial suggestion was raised by senior Colin Wood, and formally proposed by Jessamyn Conrad, and seconded by sophomore Kyle Gilman. That night, the Declaration and Articles of War were written, sent to the Pforzheimer listserv, and the war had officially begun.

Adams House gained the element of surprise when students blanketed "O-Ho" with the Declaration of War overnight. Adams House declared that it was in possession of the Pforzheimer "Pf", and would henceforth be known as Pfadams House. The "Adams House" sign above C-Entry was actually changed at this time. The next day, when Pforzheimer students awoke, they discovered that every "Pf" in their dormitory had been "stolen" (covered with masking tape). A week of pranks followed, the most extensive of which occurred when Pforzheimer residents forged notices from the freshman dorms, informing all freshmen that Annenberg Hall was closed, and to go to the Adams dining hall for Sunday brunch. Students from Pforzheimer House (Andy and Aric) made a bold, daytime raid, stealing the gong and closing the gates leading to the Adams dining hall with a bike lock at lunch hour one day, creating chaos. Adams residents, including both Masters, took to reading the declaration of war over the "Orzheimer" call boxes during lunch and dinner.

To settle this war, Adams and Pforzheimer House agreed to a binding field day competition, including a football game, a tug-of-war, and a fifteen-minute musical theatre competition. A Pforzheimer win would result in a return to "Adams" from "Pfadams", the return of the gong, and would grant Pforzheimer House residents dining hall privileges at Adams House. An Adams win would result in a return of the gong, continued use of "Pfadams House" with Pforzheimer House becoming "Orzheimer House", though Adams generously offered to supply the rival library with a copy of "Hooked on Phonics." An Adams win would also grant the Pfoho "colonists" dining hall privileges at Adams House. Led by Masters McCarthy, presiding over the event in full academic regalia, Pforzheimer House secured a resounding victory (trouncing Adams in the football and tug-of-war and putting up a brave but wholly inadequate showing in the musico-theatrical segment), and Adams accordingly agreed to provide its residents with ID stickers granting them access to the Adams dining hall, an arrangement that stands to this day.

For several years, a "War Memorial" stood in Adams House, commemorating the event.

== Administration ==
As with all houses at Harvard College, Pforzheimer House consists of two classes of members/residents: the Senior Common Room (SCR) and the Junior Common Room (JCR). The official university administration of the house consists of the resident members of the Senior Common Room, such as the House faculty deans, the Allston Burr Resident Dean, senior resident tutors, and the resident tutors. There is also a non-academic house administrator and a building manager.

Erica Chenoweth and Zoe Marks are the current faculty deans. The Allston Burr Resident Dean is Monique A. Roy.

== House Committee ==
A Pforzheimer House T-shirt design

Student life and house events are administered by the House Committee, or HoCo, whose voting members must be from the Junior Common Room, i.e. the undergraduate student body of the house. Members of the Senior Common Room may attend HoCo meetings as non-voting participants. The committee operates separately from the Harvard Undergraduate Council, to organize student events and manage funding. The HoCo, as with the other student government organizations in the Houses, are funded by the UC.

== The Belltower Suite ==
The Belltower suite is one of several specially named suites at Harvard College, including Eliot House's Ground Zero, Cabot House's Library Suite, Quincy House's Terrace (formerly known as the Balcony Suite), and Currier House's Ten-Man Suite. It is named for its access to the Pforzheimer belltower.

The core Belltower Suite is Moors Hall #410, which connects by internal fire-escape passageways to Moors #403 and #404. The Belltower suite also connects to the belltower itself, which is not used for housing. Frequently, a single group of friends shares Moors #410 and #403 or, more rarely, all three of the suites; in this case, the entire area occupied by the friends becomes "the Belltower suite" / "the Belltower".

One of the largest housing arrangements on the Harvard campus, it can comfortably house twelve students with individual bedrooms, four bathrooms (three full and one half), and three common rooms.

The Belltower itself faces out over the Quadrangle and is accessed by a ladder and trap door. Access to the tower begins in the passageway that connects Moors Hall #410 and #403. A first ladder leads through a ceiling trapdoor to the carpeted mezzanine level (the "chill pad"). A second, longer ladder leads via a small hatch to the lantern of the tower called the "crow's nest". Expansive windows on all four sides of the lantern allow for a majestic view of the greater Boston area. An access door located halfway between the mezzanine and the lantern provides access to an outdoor inter-level widow's walk.

Facebook founder Mark Zuckerberg is rumored to have met his wife, Priscilla Chan, at a party in Pforzheimer's Bell Tower Suite while they were both undergraduates at Harvard College.

== Notable residents ==
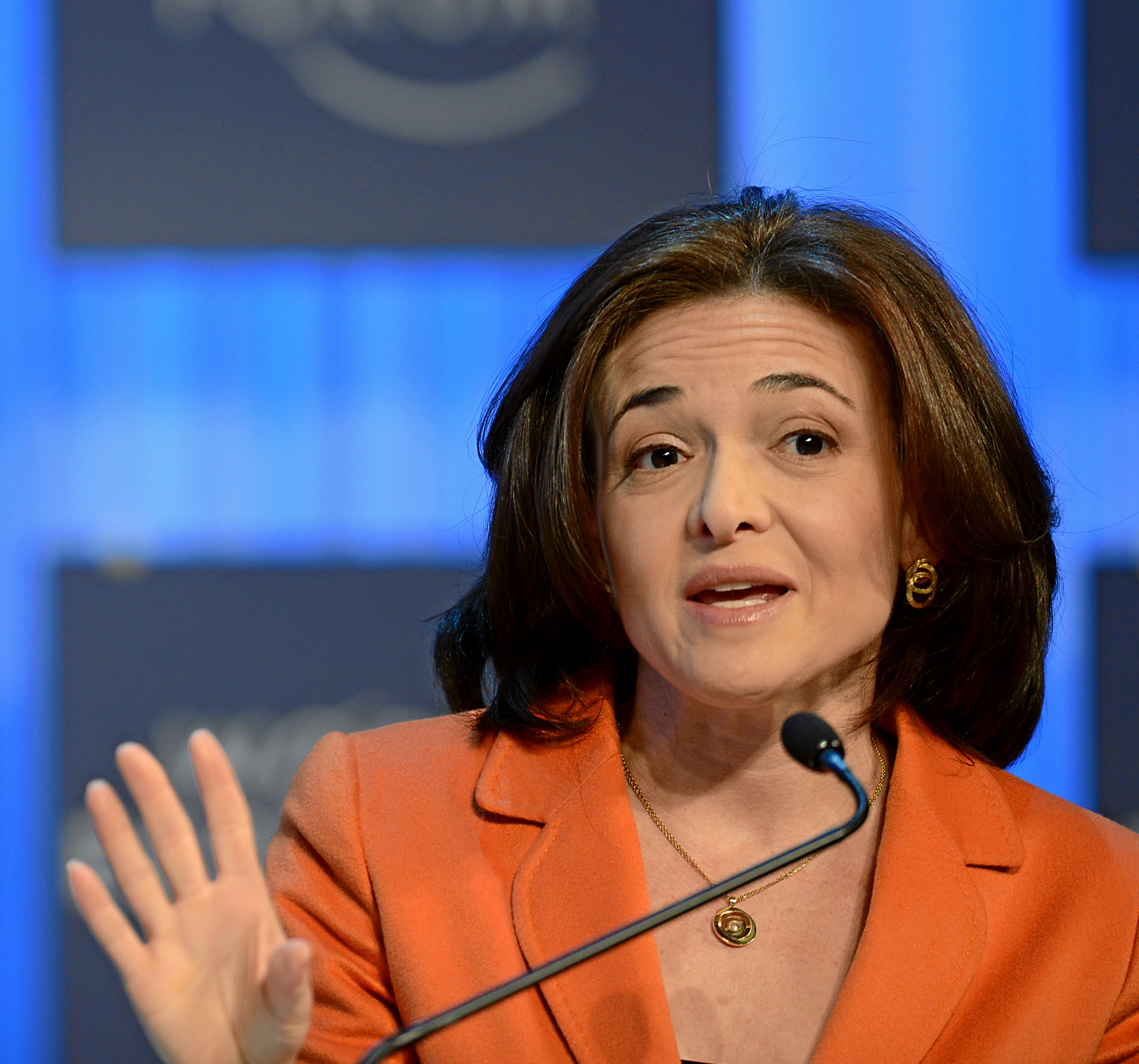
Sheryl Sandberg

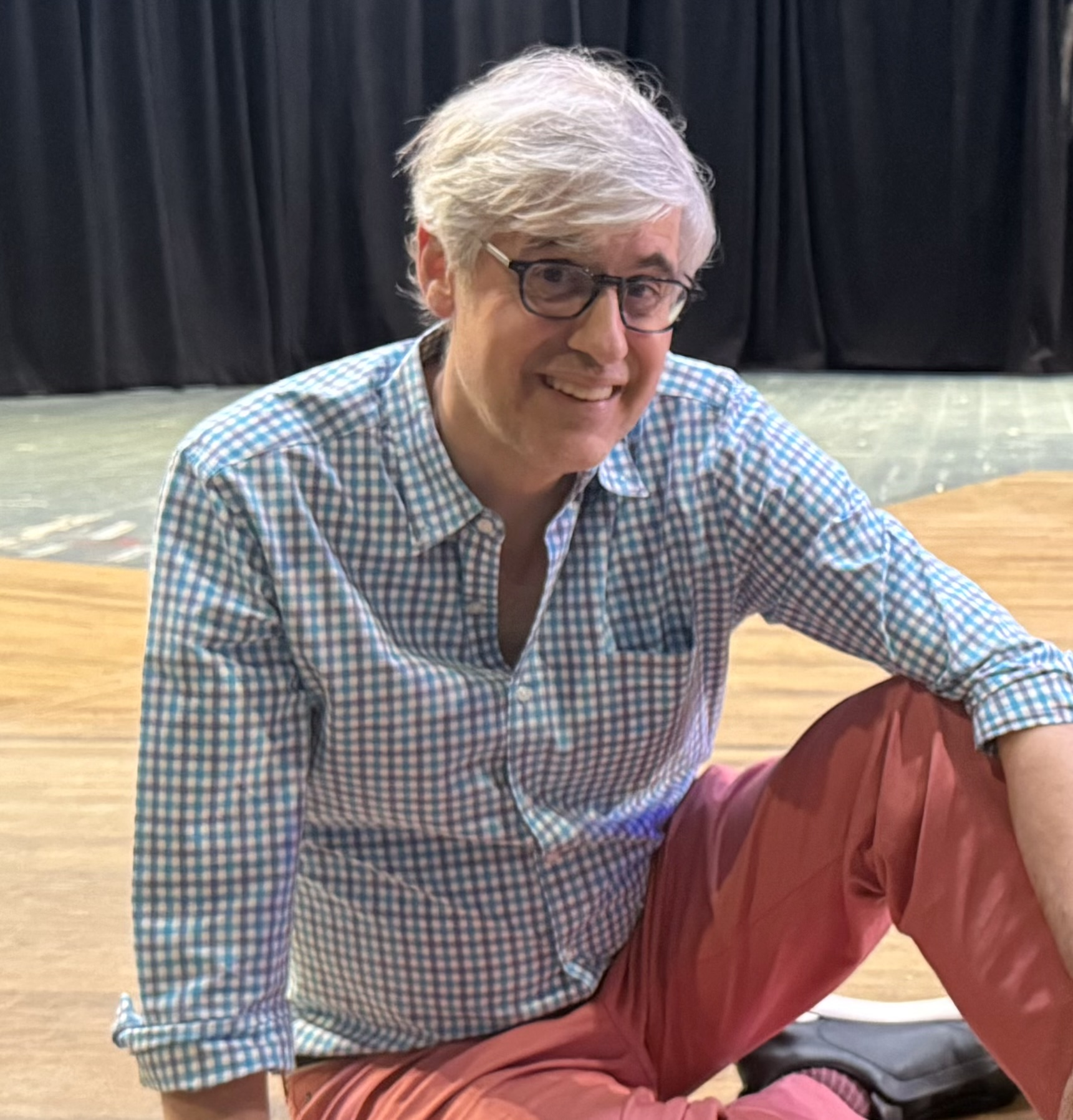
Mo Rocca

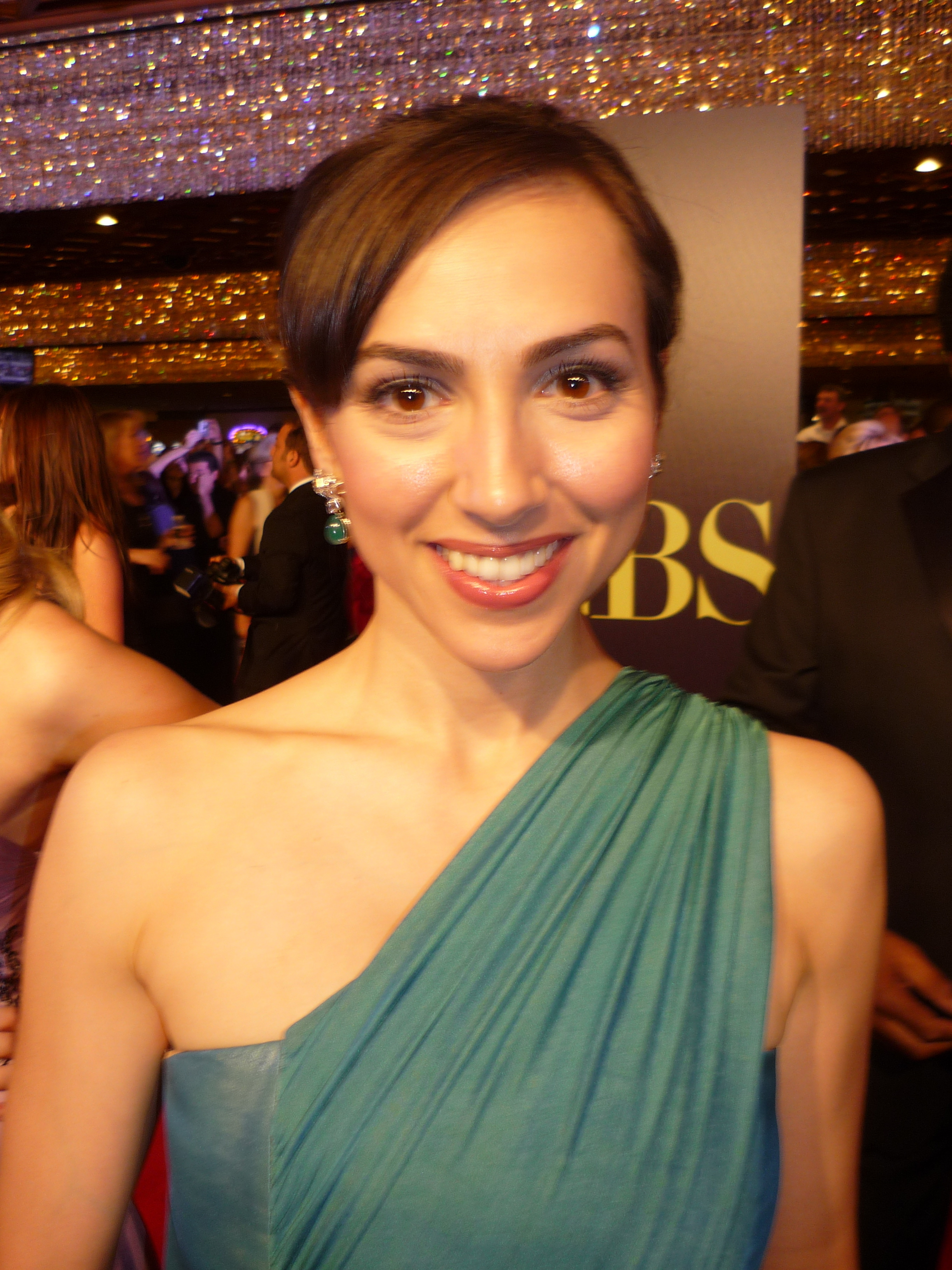
Eden Riegel

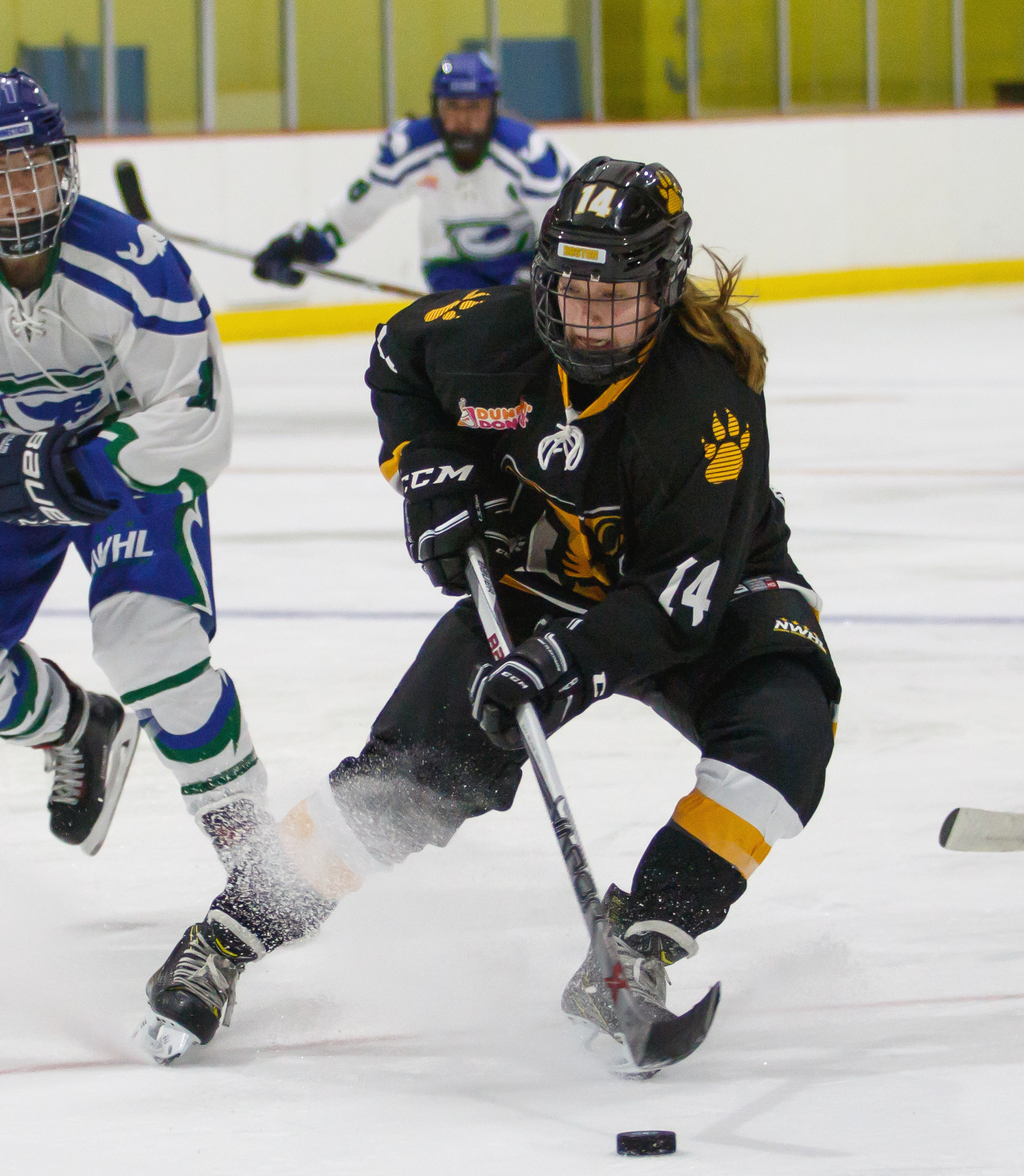
Jillian Dempsey

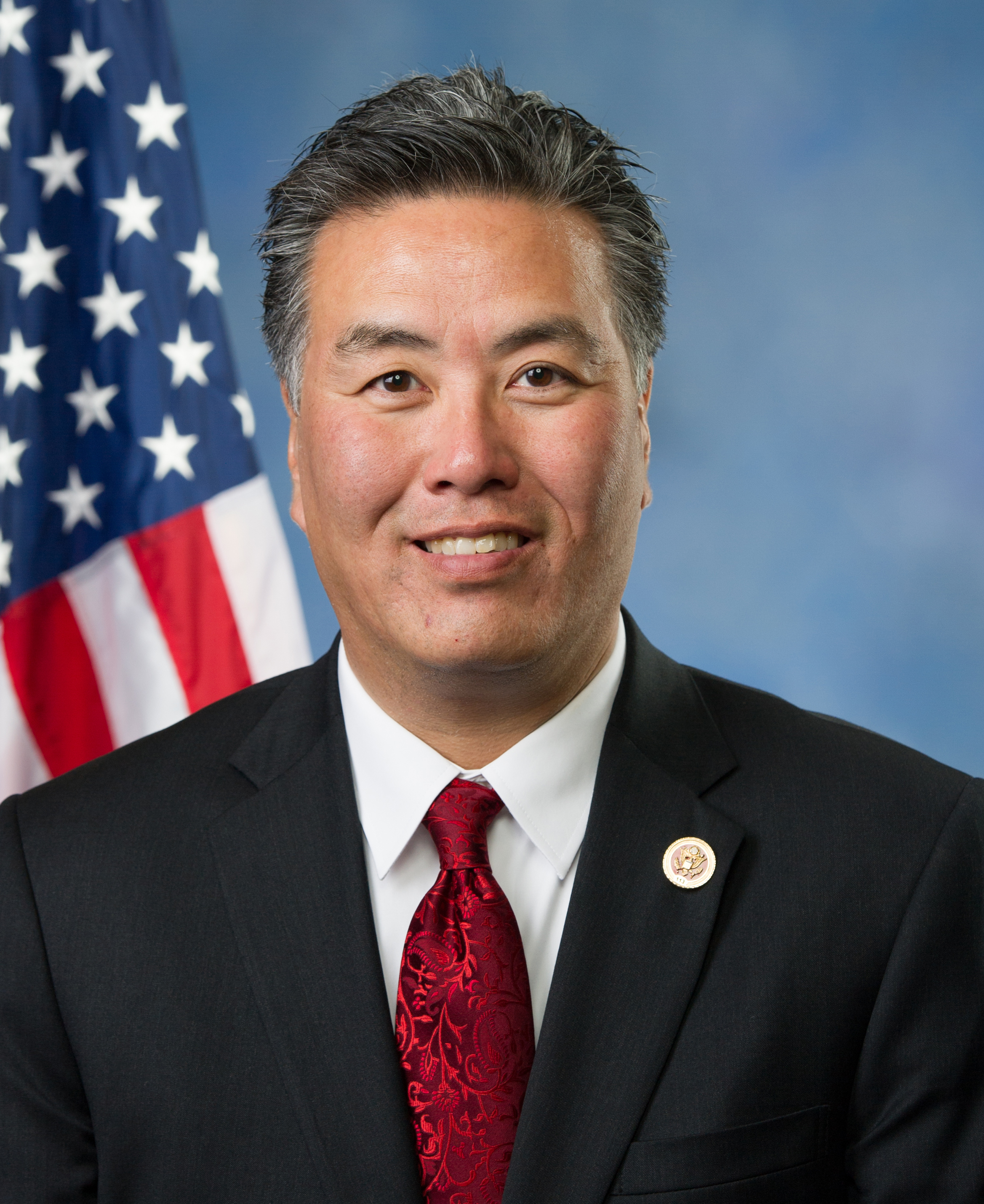
Mark Takano

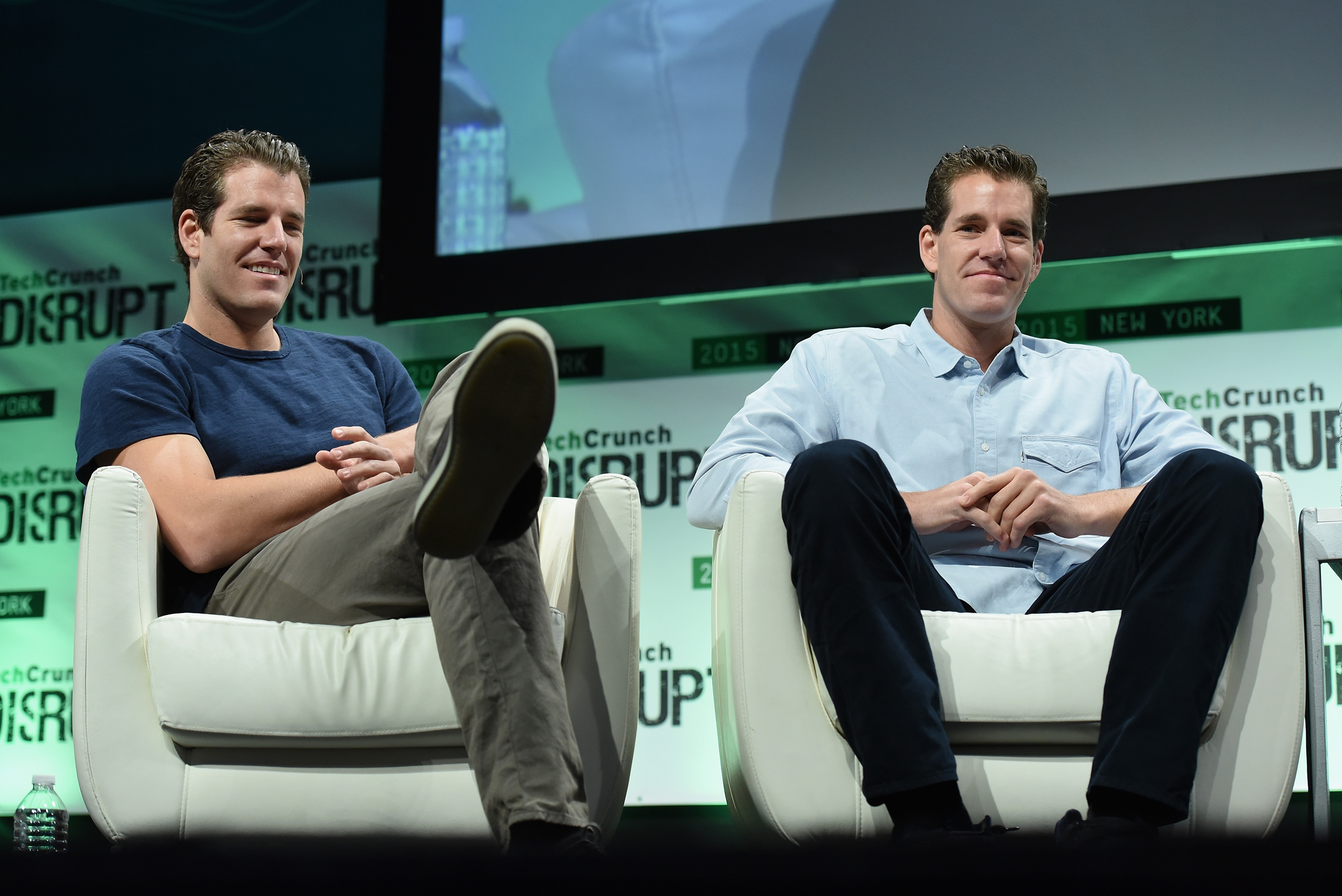
Cameron Winklevoss and Tyler Winklevoss

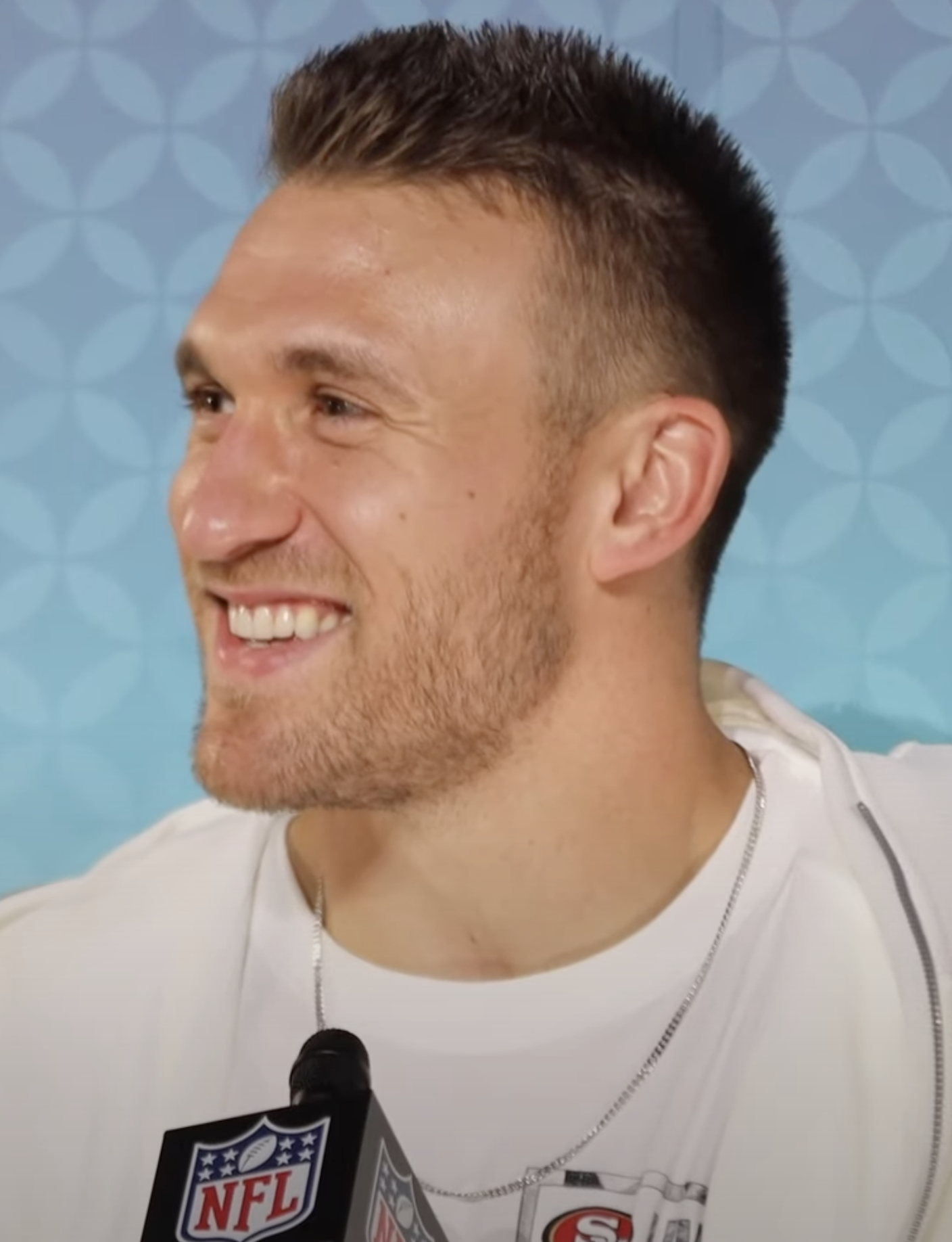
Kyle Juszczyk

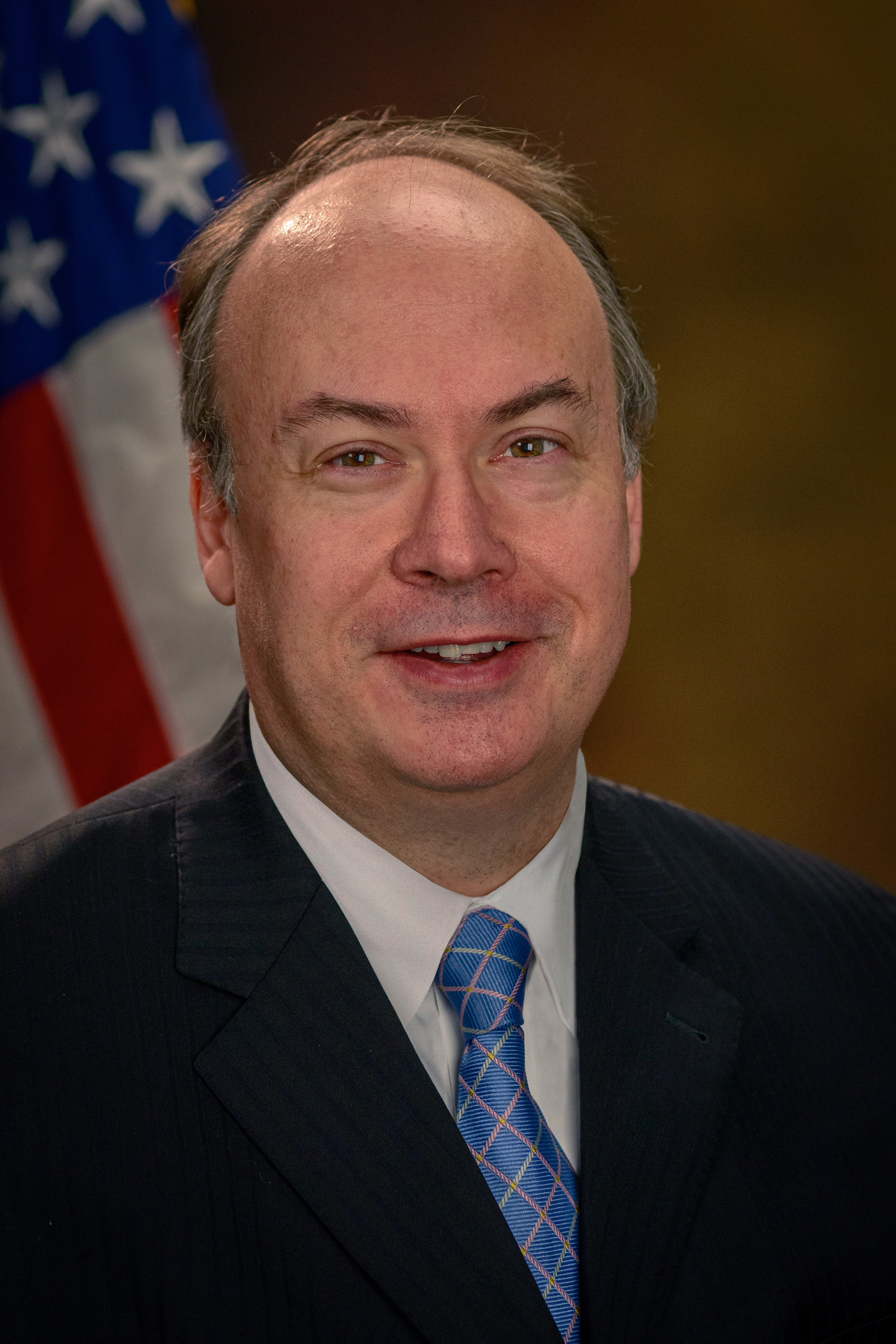
Jeffrey Clark
