= Radcliffe Quadrangle (Harvard) =

Section of Harvard University campus

Coordinates: 42.38140°N 71.12424°W

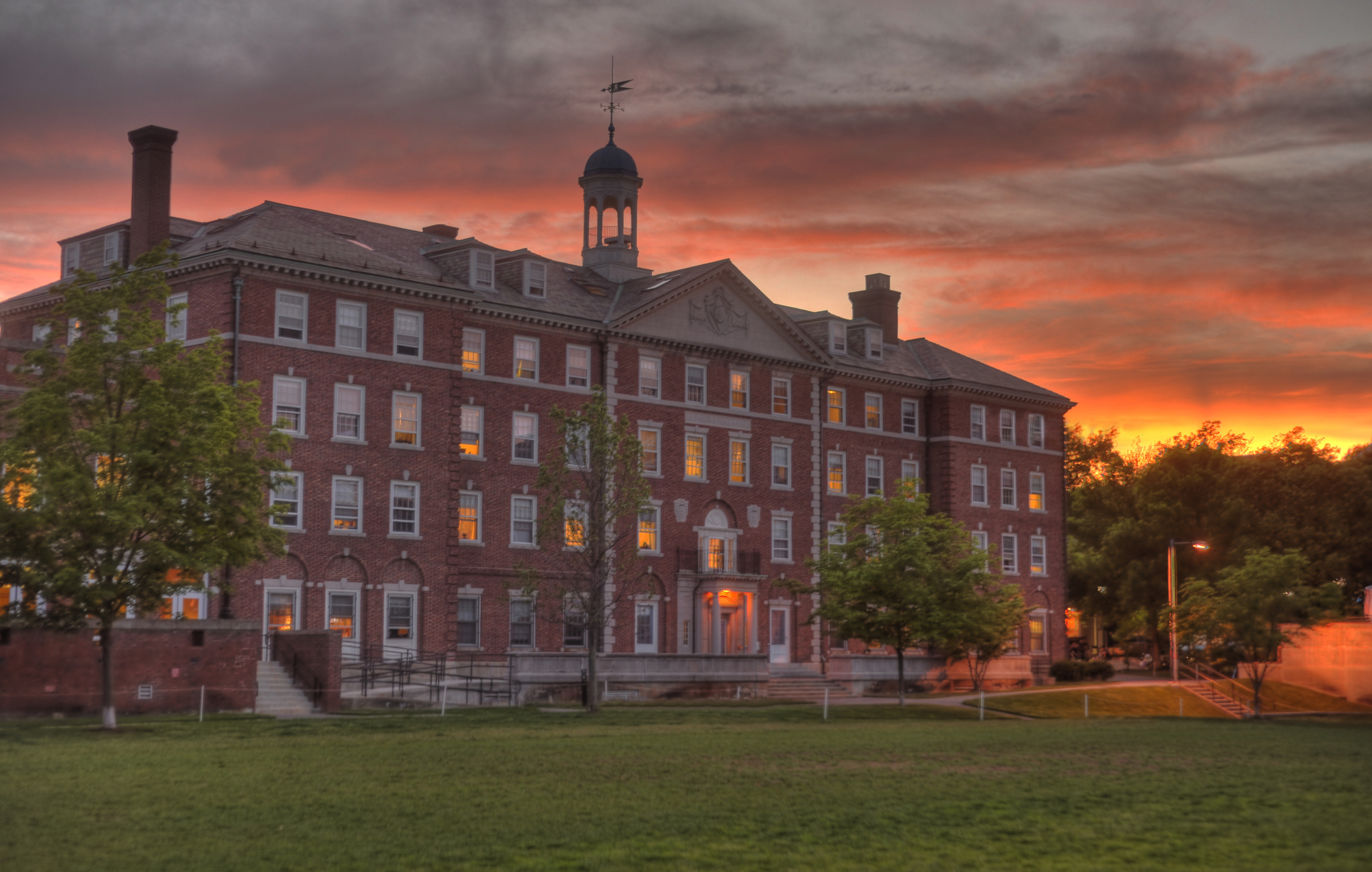
Cabot House on Radcliffe Quadrangle, May 2008

The Radcliffe Quadrangle at Harvard University, formerly the residential campus of Radcliffe College, is part of Harvard's undergraduate campus in Cambridge, Massachusetts, United States. Nicknamed the Quad, it is a traditional college quad slightly removed from the main part of campus.

== Geography ==
The term "the Quad" can refer to the rectangular green field bounded by Cabot and Pforzheimer Houses, or it can refer to the entire section of campus bounded by Garden, Linnaean, Walker, and Shepard Streets, plus the Jordans, which are east of Walker Street. This larger area consists of the Quad green itself as well as all of Pforzheimer, Cabot, and Currier Houses (the Quad Houses); plus the Hilles building, which formerly contained the Quad Library and now houses the Student Organization Center.

Currier House and Hilles are separated from the rest of the Quad by a landscaped walk and paved road, a private way used mainly by campus shuttlebuses, that runs north-south through the Quad.

Other adjacent portions of campus, such as the Botanic Gardens, Kittredge, the Quadrangle Recreational Athletic Center (Q-RAC), and the Observatory, are often also grouped as part of the Quad.

== Buildings ==
- Hilles Library
- Pforzheimer House
  - Wolbach Hall, built 1938, purchased by Radcliffe College in 1964
  - Moors Hall, built 1947
  - Holmes Hall, built 1951
  - Comstock Hall, built 1957
  - Jordan House North, built 1960
  - Jordan House South
- Cabot House
  - Bertram Hall, built 1901
  - Eliot Hall, built 1906-1907
  - Barnard Hall, built 1911-1912
  - Whitman Hall, built 1911-1912
  - Briggs Hall, built 1923
  - Cabot Hall, built 1936
- Currier House, built 1969

== Quadlings ==
The Quad Houses—Cabot, Currier, and Pforzheimer—are three of the 12 residential houses in which most Harvard undergraduates reside after their first year. Residents of these Houses are often called Quadlings (after the Quadlings of the Oz books).

The Quad is separated from and about half a mile northwest of the main part of campus surrounding Harvard Yard, where almost all undergraduate classrooms and department offices are located. The other nine Houses, called "River Houses", all neighbor each other south of Harvard Yard, in an area near the Charles River.

== History and nomenclature ==
The Quad began as housing for female Radcliffe College students in 1901 with the construction of Bertram Hall; male students first moved in around 1970 as part of an exchange program between Radcliffe and Harvard (Women from Radcliffe moved into Winthrop House at about the same time). The Quad became fully coresidential in 1972, when Radcliffe College and Harvard University agreed to let their respective students live on the other institution's campus.

Early in its history, Radcliffe College was unofficially called "the Harvard Annex," and its dorms were called "Annex housing" by Harvard students. Within Radcliffe culture, however, the collection of dormitories was officially called the "Radcliffe Quadrangle". Because of the terms of the merger agreement between Harvard University and Radcliffe College, the Radcliffe Quadrangle and the Radcliffe Yard are both designated as "Radcliffe" in perpetuity. For more on Radcliffe's shifting role in the University, see Radcliffe College.
