= Coat of arms of the University of Pennsylvania =

Versions
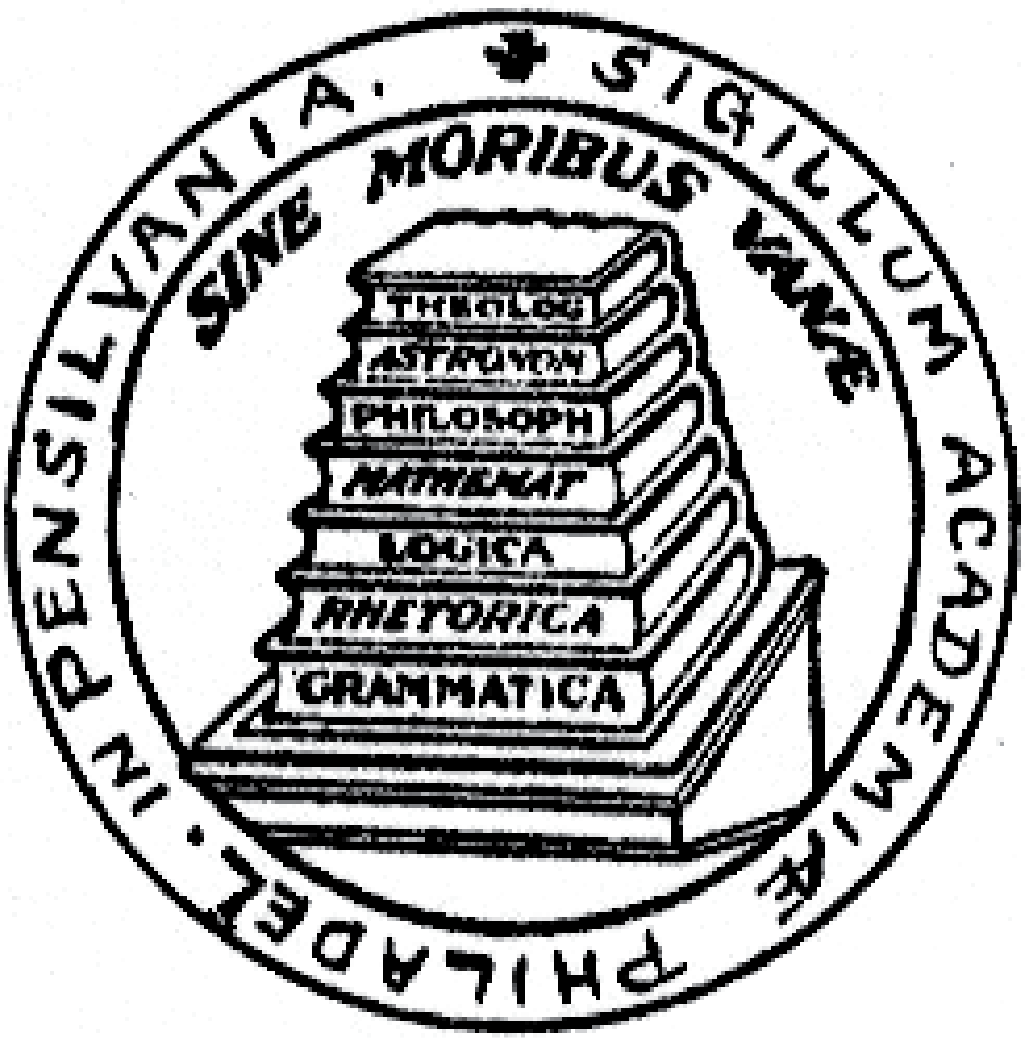
- Seal of the Corporation of the University of Pennsylvania
- Adopted: 1933; 93 years ago
- Shield: In the chief, gules, two open books and a dolphin, argent; in the ground, argent, a chevron, azure, with three plates, argent.
- Motto: "Quid leges sine moribus vanae proficiunt"

The coat of arms of the University of Pennsylvania is the assumed heraldic achievement of the University of Pennsylvania. The achievement in its current iteration was approved in 1932 and adopted in 1933. The blazon of the achievement is

Arms: Argent, a chevron Azure charged with three plates, on a chief Gules a dolphin between two open books Argent. Motto: Quid leges sine moribus vanae proficiunt.

== Symbolism ==
The arms memorialize both Benjamin Franklin and the Penn family, who were both instrumental in the foundation of the university. They include the three plates of the Penn family arms and the dolphin of the Franklin shield.

== See also ==
- Heraldry of Harvard University
- Heraldry of Columbia University
- Coat of arms of Yale University
- Coat of arms of Brown University
- Seal of Dartmouth College
