= Coat of arms of the University of Notre Dame =

Emblem of the University of Notre Dame

- Armiger: University of Notre Dame
- Adopted: February 13, 1931
- Crest: none
- Shield: Azure, a passion cross patty at the extremities Or, issuant of a champagne barry wavy of four Argent and the First, in dexter chief a mullet of six points of the Third, and over all an open book proper charged with the words VITA DULCEDO SPES in letters Sable.
- Supporters: none
- Motto: Vita, Dulcedo, Spes

The coat of arms of the University of Notre Dame is the assumed heraldic achievement of the University of Notre Dame. It was designed by noted American heraldist Pierre de Chaignon la Rose in 1931.

== History ==
The coat of arms of the University of Notre Dame was commissioned in early 1931 by university president Charles L O’Donnell, C.S.C. In the 1930s, neo-gothic architecture and heraldic achievements were a distinctive sign of prestigious academic institutions (like Princeton or Yale) that Notre Dame aspired to be part of. O'Donnell wanted to decorate the new Rockne Hall with elegant heraldic achievements, and the building was sculpted with the coat of arms of the United States, France (in homage to Notre Dame's origins), and Norway (to commemorate Knute Rockne). The president also wanted to decorate it with the coat of arms of Indiana, but was informed by the architects that neither the state of Indiana nor its Supreme Court had coat of arms.

O'Donnel authorized the university architects, Maginnis and Walsh, to commission the university's coat of arms to Pierre de Chaignon la Rose, one of America's most prominent heraldists and designer of the coat of arms of Harvard University's Graduate Schools and the University of Chicago among others. He sent his proposed design of armorial bearings in February 1931, and it was immediately accepted and assumed. The coat of arms, inserted into a circular device with written "Sigillum Universitatis Dominae Nostrae a Lacu" became the university seal. The coat of arms was carved into the Rockne Memorial building and thereafter in many locations on campus.

Another reason behind the creation of the coat of arms was institutional. Notre Dame had been founded in 1842 by Edward Sorin, member of the Congregation of Holy Cross, and the institution, interest, and activities of the Congregation and those of the university overlapped. With the recent creation of the lay board of trustees and president James A. Burns' fund drive, the two institutions were more consciously separated and were made quasi independent. Up until then, the coat of arms of the university that was used was almost identical to that of the Congregation, hence the new coat of arms commissioned in 1931 also served as a symbol of the new more independent relationship between the two institutions.

Since 2003, the university relies on a two-colored academic mark consisting of a modified version of the coat of arms, with only two colors, and the official wordmark of the university.

== Design ==
=== Blazon ===
Azure, a passion cross patty at the extremities Or, issuant of a champagne barry wavy of four Argent and the First, in dexter chief a mullet of six points of the Third, and over all an open book proper charged with the words VITA DULCEDO SPES in letters Sable.

=== Meaning ===
The colors blue and gold (azure and or in heraldry), the official colors of the university, represent Our Lady. The star represents the ancient title of Our Lady, Star of the Sea. The two wavy lines of silver at the base of the shield, used in heraldry to depict water, are used to represent the two lakes on campus from which the university gets its name (Notre Dame Du Lac). The cross represents the Congregation of Holy Cross, congregation to which university founder Edward Sorin and following presidents were part of. The open book represents learning and education, and the didactic mission of the university. On its pages is written the motto of the university "Vita, Dulcedo, Spes," from the ancient prayer Salve Regina meaning "our life, our sweetness, our hope".

== Other versions ==
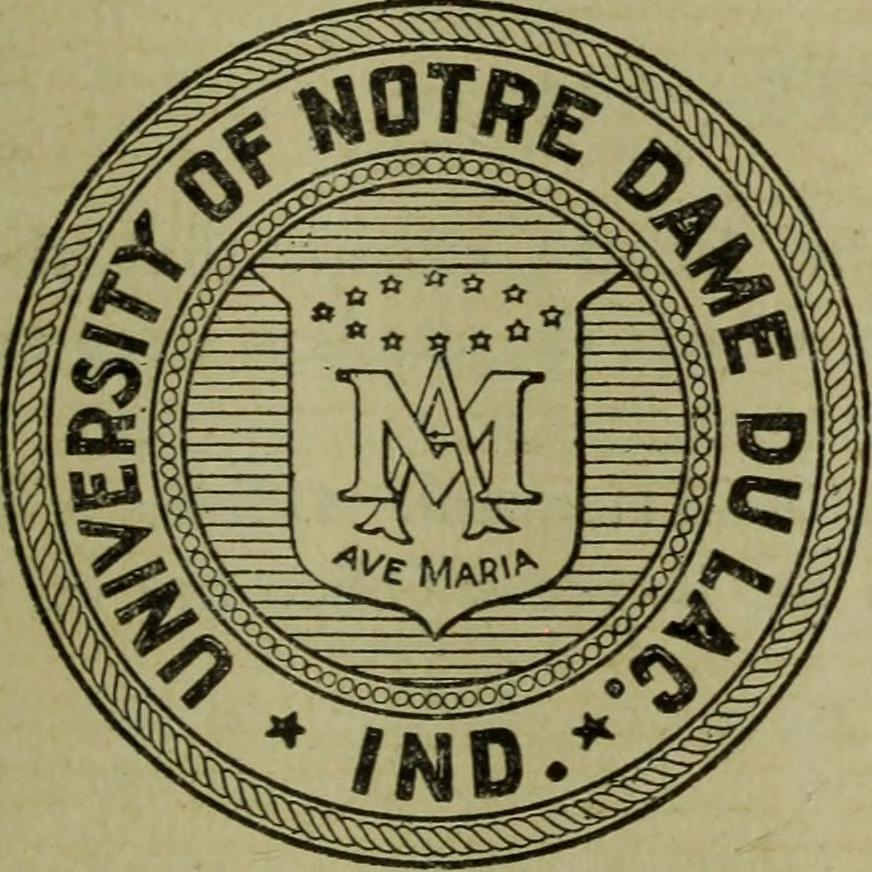
Used between 1898 and 1901.

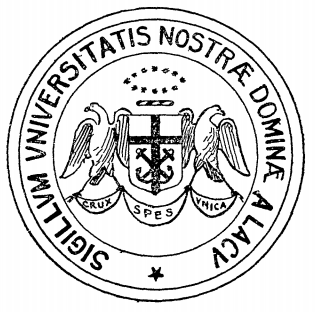
Used between 1901 and 1930. The seal is derived from the seal of the Congregation of Holy Cross.

== See also ==
- Heraldry
- Coat of arms of the University of Chicago
- Heraldry of Columbia University
- Heraldry of Harvard University
