= Psalm 36 =

Biblical psalm

- "The transgression of the wicked saith within my heart"
- Hymn psalm
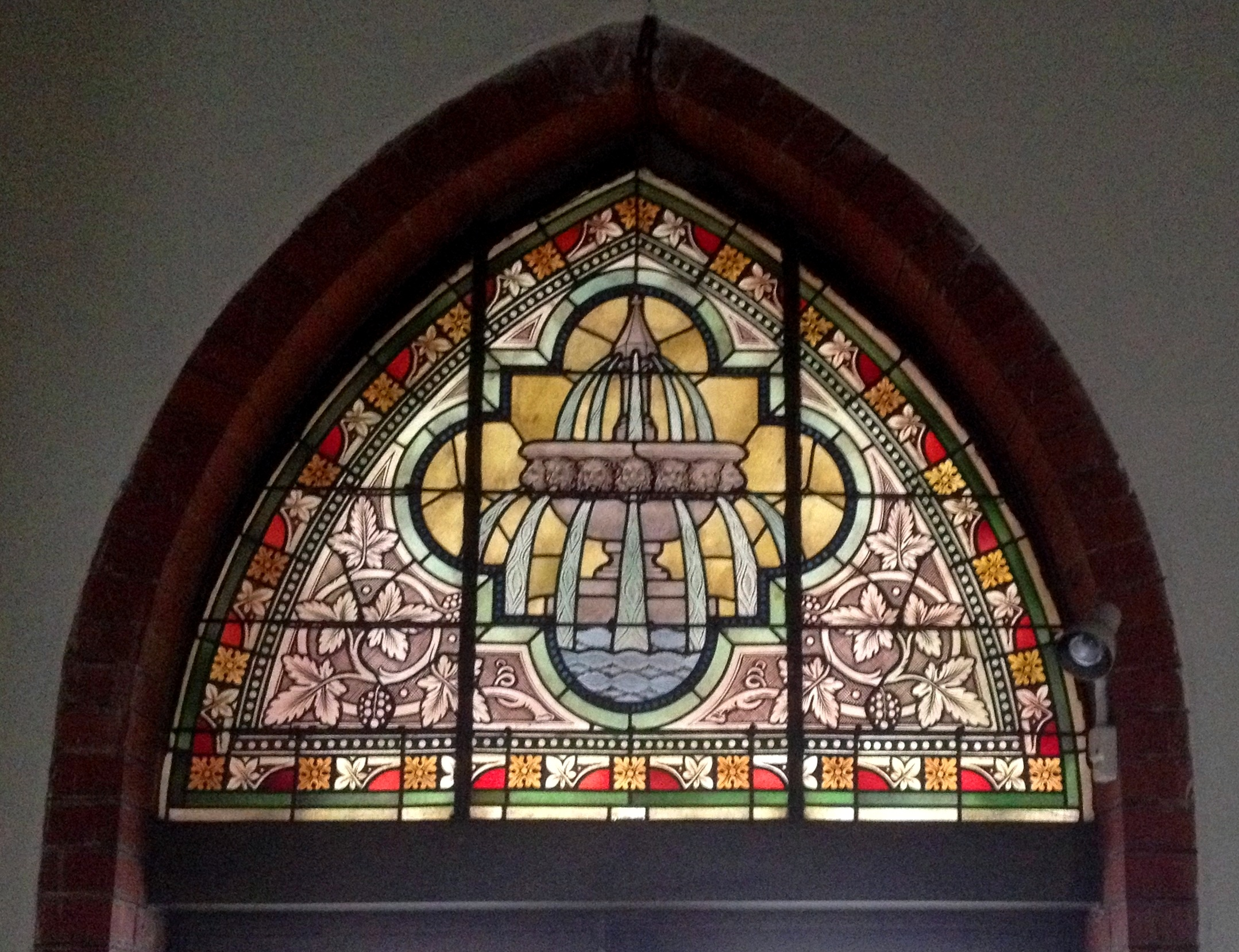
- Stained glass window depicting the "fountain of life" mentioned in the psalm, in St. Gregor VII in Bad Harzburg
- Other name: Psalm 35; "Dixit iniustus"
- Text: by David
- Language: Hebrew (original)

Psalm 36
- ← Psalm 35 Psalm 37 →
- Book: Book of Psalms
- Hebrew Bible part: Ketuvim
- Order in the Hebrew part: 1
- Category: Sifrei Emet
- Christian Bible part: Old Testament
- Order in the Christian part: 19

Psalm 36 is the 36th psalm of the Book of Psalms, beginning in English in the King James Version: "The transgression of the wicked saith within my heart". The Book of Psalms is part of the third section of the Hebrew Bible, as well as a book of the Christian Old Testament. In the slightly different numbering system used in the Greek Septuagint and Latin Vulgate translations of the Bible, this psalm is Psalm 35. In Latin, it is known as Dixit iniustus or Dixit injustus. The psalm is a hymn psalm, attributed to David.

The psalm forms a regular part of Jewish, Catholic, Lutheran, Anglican and other Protestant liturgies. It has inspired hymns based on it, and has often been set to music, by Baroque composers such as Heinrich Schütz as well as contemporary composers such as Richard Nance. Parts of this psalm have been singled out, for example, "In Thy light shall we see light" (in Latin: In lumine Tuo videbimus lumen), which is the motto of Columbia University, and which appears on its university seal.

== Background ==
The first verse of the psalm refers to its Davidic authorship. The Revised JPS Edition of the psalm reads:

לַמְנַצֵּ֬חַ ׀ לְעֶבֶד־יְהֹוָ֬ה לְדָוִֽד׃

For the leader. Of the servant of GOD, of David.

Matthew Henry suggests that David wrote this psalm after being attacked, either by Saul or by his son Absalom, as the psalm begins with a complaint against "the malice of his enemies against him". After decrying the "sinfulness of sin" in the first five verses, David lauds God's goodness toward all people and creatures.

The psalm may be understood literally as a prayer of the persecuted who has taken refuge in the Temple, or figuratively as one who has taken refuge in God. The psalmist takes pride in the goodness of God, in which he finds safety. The psalm concludes with a plea to God to bless those who honor him with his justice and protect them from the snares of the wicked. Catholic bishop Richard Challoner's version describes this psalm as "an exhortation to despise this world and the short prosperity of the wicked, and to trust in Providence".

== Uses ==
=== Judaism ===
Verse 7 is one of three verses which make up the prayer of Tzidkatcha ("Your righteousness") recited after the Chazan's repetition of the Amidah during the Shabbat afternoon prayer. In Sephardi traditions and Nusach Sefard, it is the first of the three verses recited in consecutive order: Psalms 36:7, 71:19, 119:42. In Nusach Ashkenaz, the order is reversed: Psalms 119:42, 71:19, 36:7. (Note: Tzidkatcha is not recited if Shabbat falls on the day before Tisha B'Av.) Verses 8–11 are recited after the wrapping of the tallit during the morning prayer service. Verse 9 is incorporated into the Shabbat evening table song Kol Mekadesh Shevii. Verse 10 is part of the Selichot prayers. Verse 12 is said during Maariv on Yom Kippur night. In the Siddur Sfas Emes, Psalm 36 is recited on behalf of a sick person.

=== Christianity ===
==== New Testament ====
Verse 1b is quoted in Romans 3:18 of the Christian New Testament.

==== Catholic Church ====
In the liturgy of the Mass, Psalm 36 is read on Wednesday of Week 16 in Ordinary Time, Year II.

==== Book of Common Prayer ====
In the Church of England's Book of Common Prayer, this psalm is appointed to be read on the morning of the seventh day of the month.

=== Seal and books ===
The coat of arms of Columbia University, adopted in 1949

The Vulgate version of verse 10, "In lumine Tuo videbimus lumen" ("In Thy light shall we see light") is part of the original heraldic seal of Columbia University, adopted in 1755. Several books also take this phrase as their title, including the Valparaiso University prayerbook, In Thy Light We See Light, the Bible study book In Thy Light I See Light, and the Christian biography In His Light, I See Light Psalms 36:9: A Prodigal's Journey Into the Light.

Besides Columbia University, a number of other universities have mottos which were inspired by Psalm 36:9, including the University of Fort Hare (South Africa), St. Mary's University (Calgary), and Valparaiso University (Indiana).

== Hymns and musical settings ==
Hymns based on Psalm 36 include in English "Praise to the Lord, the Almighty" and "Immortal, Invisible, God Only Wise". The refrain and the first stanza of the German song "Herr, deine Güte reicht, so weit der Himmel ist" (Lord, your goodness extends as far as heaven)", published in 1965 with text by Gerhard Valentin and a melody by Herbert Beuerle, is based on verses from Psalm 36. Maria Luise Thurmair wrote "Herr, deine Güt ist unbegrenzt" based on Psalm 36, published in 1971 with the melody of "O Mensch, bewein dein Sünde groß".

The psalm and selected verses have often been set to music. Thomas Ravenscroft wrote a setting for four-part choir in English on a French melody, published in his collection The Whole Booke of Psalmes in 1621, with the incipit "The wicked with his works unjust". Heinrich Schütz set the psalm in German with the text from the Becker Psalter, Ich sag's von Grund meins Herzens frei (I say it freely from the depth of my heart), for choir as his SWV 133. George Garrett set the psalm for the Anglican Church, titled Psalm 36. Dixit injustus and the incipit "My heart showeth me the wickedness of the ungodly". Richard Nance set the psalm for choir in 2002 on a commission by the American Choral Directors Association as the Raymond W. Brock memorial composition, published by Walton Music.

The passage "How precious is your unfailing love, O God" was set by David Lee in a larger composition in 2012, and has been used as a Responsorial.

== Text ==
The following table shows the Hebrew text of the Psalm with vowels, alongside the Koine Greek text in the Septuagint and the English translation from the King James Version. Note that the meaning can slightly differ between these versions, as the Septuagint and the Masoretic Text come from different textual traditions. (Note: A 1917 translation directly from Hebrew to English by the Jewish Publication Society can be found here or here, and an 1844 translation directly from the Septuagint by L. C. L. Brenton can be found here. Both translations are in the public domain.) In the Septuagint, this psalm is numbered Psalm 35.

#	Hebrew	English	Greek
(Note: In the Jewish verse numbering, the ascription of this psalm is verse 1, and the rest of the psalm begins from verse 2. However, the Christian verse numbering does not count the ascription as a separate verse.)	לַמְנַצֵּ֬חַ ׀ לְעֶבֶד־יְהֹוָ֬ה לְדָוִֽד׃	(To the chief Musician, A Psalm of David the servant of the LORD.)	Εἰς τὸ τέλος· τῷ δούλῳ Κυρίου τῷ Δαυΐδ. -
1	נְאֻֽם־פֶּ֣שַׁע לָ֭רָשָׁע בְּקֶ֣רֶב לִבִּ֑י אֵֽין־פַּ֥חַד אֱ֝לֹהִ֗ים לְנֶ֣גֶד עֵינָֽיו׃	The transgression of the wicked saith within my heart, that there is no fear of God before his eyes.	ΦΗΣΙΝ ὁ παράνομος τοῦ ἁμαρτάνειν ἐν ἑαυτῷ, οὐκ ἔστι φόβος Θεοῦ ἀπέναντι τῶν ὀφθαλμῶν αὐτοῦ·
2	כִּֽי־הֶחֱלִ֣יק אֵלָ֣יו בְּעֵינָ֑יו לִמְצֹ֖א עֲוֺנ֣וֹ לִשְׂנֹֽא׃	For he flattereth himself in his own eyes, until his iniquity be found to be hateful.	ὅτι ἐδόλωσεν ἐνώπιον αὐτοῦ τοῦ εὑρεῖν τὴν ἀνομίαν αὐτοῦ καὶ μισῆσαι.
3	דִּבְרֵי־פִ֭יו אָ֣וֶן וּמִרְמָ֑ה חָדַ֖ל לְהַשְׂכִּ֣יל לְהֵיטִֽיב׃	The words of his mouth are iniquity and deceit: he hath left off to be wise, and to do good.	τὰ ῥήματα τοῦ στόματος αὐτοῦ ἀνομία καὶ δόλος, οὐκ ἠβουλήθη συνιέναι τοῦ ἀγαθῦναι·
4	אָ֤וֶן ׀ יַחְשֹׁ֗ב עַֽל־מִשְׁכָּ֫ב֥וֹ יִ֭תְיַצֵּב עַל־דֶּ֣רֶךְ לֹא־ט֑וֹב רָ֝֗ע לֹ֣א יִמְאָֽס׃	He deviseth mischief upon his bed; he setteth himself in a way that is not good; he abhorreth not evil.	ἀνομίαν διελογίσατο ἐπὶ τῆς κοίτης αὐτοῦ, παρέστη πάσῃ ὁδῷ οὐκ ἀγαθῇ, κακίᾳ δὲ οὐ προσώχθισε.
5	יְ֭הֹוָה בְּהַשָּׁמַ֣יִם חַסְדֶּ֑ךָ אֱ֝מ֥וּנָתְךָ֗ עַד־שְׁחָקִֽים׃	Thy mercy, O LORD, is in the heavens; and thy faithfulness reacheth unto the clouds.	Κύριε, ἐν τῷ οὐρανῷ τὸ ἔλεός σου, καὶ ἡ ἀλήθειά σου ἕως τῶν νεφελῶν·
6	צִדְקָתְךָ֨ ׀ כְּֽהַרְרֵי־אֵ֗ל מִ֭שְׁפָּטֶיךָ תְּה֣וֹם רַבָּ֑ה אָ֤דָֽם וּבְהֵמָ֖ה תוֹשִׁ֣יעַ יְהֹוָֽה׃	Thy righteousness is like the great mountains; thy judgments are a great deep: O LORD, thou preservest man and beast.	ἡ δικαιοσύνη σου ὡς ὄρη Θεοῦ, τὰ κρίματά σου ὡσεὶ ἄβυσσος πολλή· ἀνθρώπους καὶ κτήνη σώσεις, Κύριε.
7	מַה־יָּקָ֥ר חַסְדְּךָ֗ אֱלֹ֫הִ֥ים וּבְנֵ֥י אָדָ֑ם בְּצֵ֥ל כְּ֝נָפֶ֗יךָ יֶחֱסָיֽוּן׃	How excellent is thy lovingkindness, O God! therefore the children of men put their trust under the shadow of thy wings.	ὡς ἐπλήθυνας τὸ ἔλεός σου, ὁ Θεός· οἱ δὲ υἱοὶ τῶν ἀνθρώπων ἐν σκέπῃ τῶν πτερύγων σου ἐλπιοῦσι.
8	יִ֭רְוְיֻן מִדֶּ֣שֶׁן בֵּיתֶ֑ךָ וְנַ֖חַל עֲדָנֶ֣יךָ תַשְׁקֵֽם׃	They shall be abundantly satisfied with the fatness of thy house; and thou shalt make them drink of the river of thy pleasures.	μεθυσθήσονται ἀπὸ πιότητος οἴκου σου, καὶ τὸν χειμάῤῥουν τῆς τρυφῆς σου ποτιεῖς αὐτούς·
9	כִּֽי־עִ֭מְּךָ מְק֣וֹר חַיִּ֑ים בְּ֝אוֹרְךָ֗ נִרְאֶה־אֽוֹר׃	For with thee is the fountain of life: in thy light shall we see light.	ὅτι παρὰ σοὶ πηγὴ ζωῆς, ἐν τῷ φωτί σου ὀψόμεθα φῶς.
10	מְשֹׁ֣ךְ חַ֭סְדְּךָ לְיֹדְעֶ֑יךָ וְ֝צִדְקָֽתְךָ֗ לְיִשְׁרֵי־לֵֽב׃	O continue thy lovingkindness unto them that know thee; and thy righteousness to the upright in heart.	παράτεινον τὸ ἔλεός σου τοῖς γινώσκουσί σε καὶ τὴν δικαιοσύνην σου τοῖς εὐθέσι τῇ καρδίᾳ.
11	אַל־תְּ֭בוֹאֵנִי רֶ֣גֶל גַּאֲוָ֑ה וְיַד־רְ֝שָׁעִ֗ים אַל־תְּנִדֵֽנִי׃	Let not the foot of pride come against me, and let not the hand of the wicked remove me.	μὴ ἐλθέτω μοι ποὺς ὑπερηφανίας, καὶ χεὶρ ἁμαρτωλοῦ μὴ σαλεύσαι με.
12	שָׁ֣ם נָ֭פְלוּ פֹּ֣עֲלֵי אָ֑וֶן דֹּ֝ח֗וּ וְלֹא־יָ֥כְלוּ קֽוּם׃	There are the workers of iniquity fallen: they are cast down, and shall not be able to rise.	ἐκεῖ ἔπεσον πάντες οἱ ἐργαζόμενοι τὴν ἀνομίαν, ἐξώσθησαν καὶ οὐ μὴ δύνωνται στῆναι.

=== Verse 1 ===
The wording in the King James Version, The transgression of the wicked saith within my heart, raises some difficulties. Alexander Kirkpatrick suggests that it is "unnatural to regard transgression as uttering its oracle in the Psalmist’s heart", and he argues that the reading of the Septuagint, Vulgate, Syriac texts and Jerome, within his heart, is a preferable reading. The Revised Standard Version (1946, 1952) has the wording, in his heart, and the 1989 New Revised Standard Version uses the words in their hearts.

=== Verse 6 ===
The juxtaposition of man and animal in verse 6, You save man and beast, has been subject to various interpretations. The Talmud (Chullin 5b) says that "beast" refers to "people who are wise in understanding but make themselves simple like a dumb beast". The Midrash (Genesis Rabbah 33:1) interprets this verse as meaning that God saves man in the merit of the animals. The verse is also seen by Jewish ethicists as endorsing animal welfare and animal rights. Saint Augustine suggests that this verse proves that animals also receive salvation.

=== Verse 9 ===
The fountain of life mentioned in verse 9 (verse 8 in the KJV) has been depicted, for example on a stained glass window at the Catholic church St. Gregor VII in Bündheim, part of Bad Harzburg, Lower Saxony, Germany. The phrase has been used in the context of preservation of the natural environment, such as an initiative of Christian churches in Württemberg to focus on Wasser, Gabe Gottes (Water, gift of God) on the "Tag der Schöpfung" (Day of Creation), 1 September in 2006.
