= William Muss-Arnolt =

William (Wilhelm) Muss-Arnolt (May 7, 1860 in Cologne – June 25, 1927 in New York) was an Assyriologist and librarian known for his exposition of the Assyrian language.

Muss-Arnolt received a B.D. from New Brunswick Theological Seminary in 1883, and a Ph.D. from Johns Hopkins University in 1888. He taught at the University of Michigan for one semester, then went to the University of Chicago, where he continued work on his Concise Dictionary of the Assyrian Language. He ended his career as a librarian at the Boston Public Library.

In 1900 Muss-Arnolt published an article positing a Babylonian origin for the words Urim and Thummim in the Hebrew Bible. This article originally appeared in the American Journal of Semitic Languages and Literatures and was thereafter published separately by the University of Chicago Press.

Muss-Arnolt's Concise Dictionary of the Assyrian Language was completed in 1905, providing a useful tool for translators faced with a large volume of newly discovered cuneiform texts. The Chicago Tribune wrote of this work in progress in 1901:

An ordinary dictionary stands as a monument to several men's perseverance, but one compiled by one man which has to make plain in two languages the mysteries of the Assyrian is not an ordinary monument—it is an obelisk.

University of Michigan librarian William W. Bishop wrote that he owed to Muss-Arnolt "a severe regard for bibliographic accuracy." He also mentions that Muss-Arnolt was Protestant, with Jewish ancestry.

== Selected publications ==
- "On Semitic Words in Greek and Latin", Transactions of the American Philological Association, Vol. 23, 1892. (PDF at Internet Archive)
- "The Names of the Assyro-Babylonian Months and Their Regents", Journal of Biblical Literature Vol. 11, No. 1, 1892. (PDF)
- "The Urim and Thummim: A suggestion as to their original nature and significance"; American Journal of Semitic Languages and Literatures, Vol. XVI, No. 4; July 1900. (PDF)
- A Concise Dictionary of the Assyrian Language. Berlin: Reuther & Reichard, 1905.
  - Volume 1: A—MUQQU (PDF at Internet Archive)
  - Volume 2: MIQQU—TITURRU (PDF at Internet Archive)
- The Book of Common Prayer Among the Nations of the World: A History of Translations of the Prayer Book of the Church of England and of the Protestant Episcopal Church of America. London: Society for Promoting Christian Knowledge, 1914.
  - Full text PDF and HTML by chapter.
- "Maneant Sua Data Libellis: A Protest and a Plea", Papers of the Bibliographical Society of America Vol. 13, 1919. (PDF at U. Chicago Journals; full volume at Internet Archive)

== Bibliography ==
- Borger, Rykle. "Altorientalische Lexikographie - Geschichte und Probleme". Nachrichten der Akademie der Wissenschaften in Göttingen, Philologisch-Historische Klasse, 1984, p. 85-89.
