= Seal of Dartmouth College =

Insignia of Dartmouth College since 1773

Original Seal of Dartmouth College

The Seal of Dartmouth College is the official insignia of Dartmouth College, an Ivy League university located in Hanover, New Hampshire, United States. The original seal of Dartmouth College was adopted in 1773, and was engraved by Nathaniel Hurd, who also designed the seal for Harvard College. In 1940, the seal was redone as a line drawing by W. A. Dwiggins, and was further modified in 1957 to correct the founding year of the school from 1770 to 1769. Although Dartmouth College introduced a new logo known as the "D-Pine" in 2018, school officials at the time said that it was not intended to replace the shield.

The main shield in the original design depicted a band of Native Americans emerging from a pine grove toward a two-story building; one of them is holding a book. Above the shield in the original design is an irradiated triangle with the Hebrew words El Shaddai. A diagonal label above the trees contained the Latin motto, Vox clamantis in deserto, which means "the voice of one crying in the wilderness", referring to Dartmouth College's origins in training missionaries in the wilderness of New Hampshire.

== Design and creation ==
=== Royal charter and seal ===
Dartmouth College received a royal charter on December 13, 1769 through New Hampshire's colonial governor John Wentworth. The charter required a seal that was to be:

engraven in such a form and with such an inscription as shall be devised by the said Trustees for the time being or by the major part of any seven or more of them convened for the service of the said College as is above directed.

Nevertheless, on March 13, 1770, founder Eleazar Wheelock wrote to the trustees of the English fund that was supporting the College (rather than the American trustees of the institution itself, as the charter stipulated) to suggest that his:

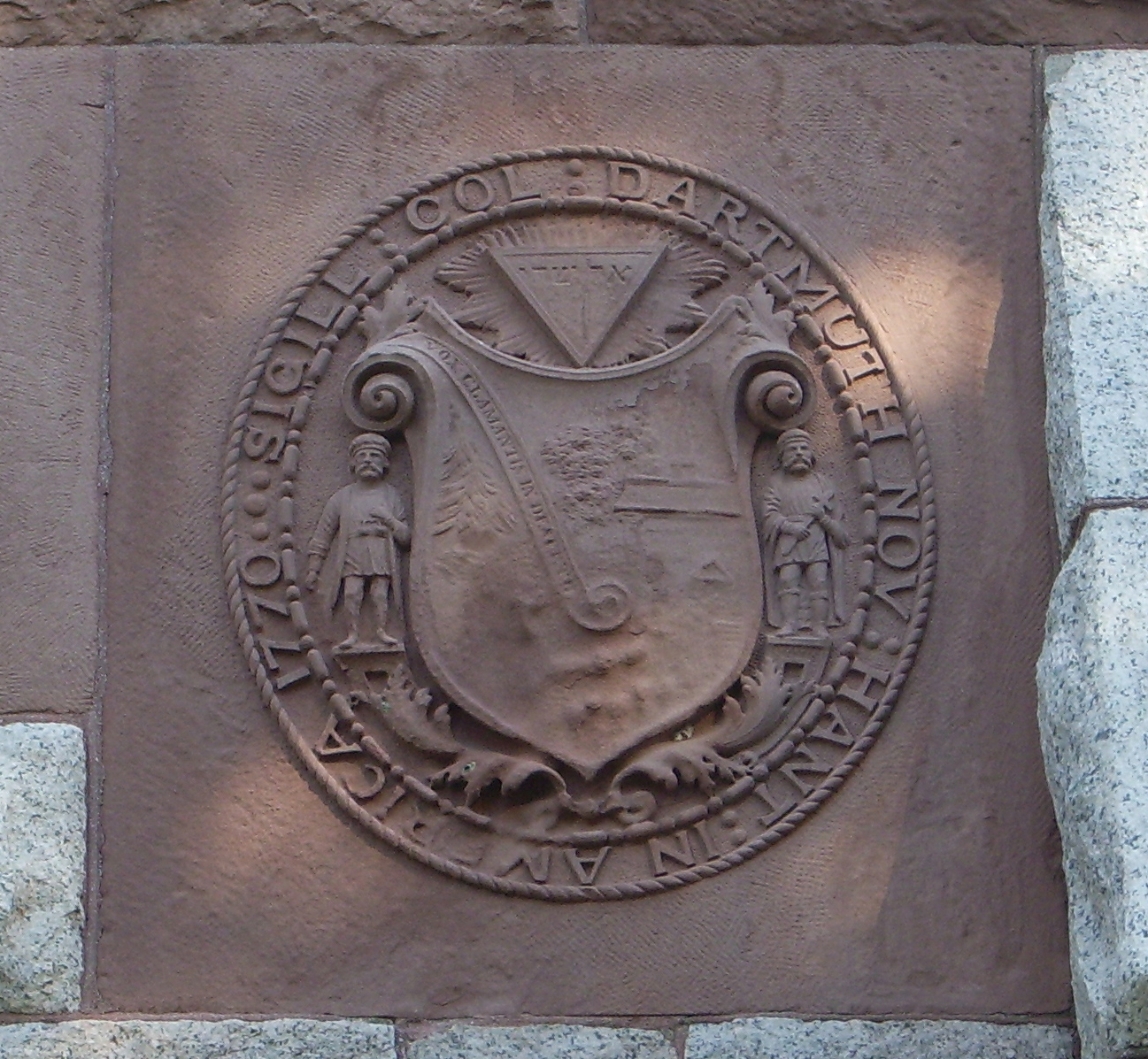
The Seal as engraved on the exterior of Rollins Chapel

Patrons would devise a proper Seal for the College with one of the Gentlemans coat of arms upon it, if they shall think Proper this motto around it Vox Clamantis in Deserto this may also Serve a proper Seal for the Commissions of the Missionaries, as well for Diplomas, and be a Standing Evidence and monitor to succeeding Generations of the Original Design of this Institution.

The English trustees, including Lord Dartmouth, did not take up the suggestion. Evidence exists that they were annoyed with Wheelock's acquisition of a charter for a college; they were under the impression that the funds under their control were to be used to support Wheelock's efforts at educating and Christianizing Native Americans at Moor's Indian Charity School at Lebanon, Connecticut. Wheelock then designed a seal for his college bearing a striking resemblance to the seal of the Society for the Propagation of the Gospel, a missionary society founded in London in 1701, in order to maintain the illusion that his college was more for mission work than for higher education.

Wheelock arranged for Nathaniel Hurd, a Boston silversmith, to engrave the seal. Hurd had engraved many coats of arms and appears in a John Singleton Copley portrait of c. 1765 with two books, one of which is A Display of Heraldry by John Guillim (1610). Hurd probably designed the seal based on a description and rough sketches he had been given.

Wheelock wrote to Governor Wentworth on May 22, 1772, saying "I hope that Mr Hurd will have the College Seal compleated by Commencement." The seal (a single-sided "female" die used to form impressions in wax) was ready by Commencement of 1773, and Portsmouth resident and former Chief Justice and Treasurer of the Province of New Hampshire George Jaffrey donated it to the College. The trustees officially accepted the seal on August 25, 1773, describing it as:

An Oval, circumscribed by a Line containing SIGILL: COL: DARTMUTH: NOV: HANT: IN AMERICA 1770. within projecting a Pine Grove on the Right, whence proceed Natives towards an Edifice two Storey on the left; which bears in a Label over the Grove these Words "vox clamantis in deserto" the whole supported by Religion on the Right and Justice on the Left, and bearing in a Triangle irradiate, with the Hebrew Words [El Shaddai], agreeable to the above Impression, be the common Seal under which to pass all Diplomas or Certificates of Degrees, and all other Affairs of Business of and concerning Dartmouth College.

Trustee George Jaffrey of Portsmouth donated a screw press for use with the die. The screw press continued to be used at the university until 1876, while the original die engraved by Hurd was used until at least 1891.

=== Mottos ===
The Latin words on the original seal, Vox clamantis in deserto, mean "A voice of one crying in the wilderness". The motto is from Chapter 40 of the Book of Isaiah, which in the King James version says, "The voice of one that crieth in the wilderness, prepare the way of our Lord, make straight in the desert a highway for our God."

Suggested by Wheelock himself, the Latin motto referred to the origins of Dartmouth College as a school to train young white men for missionary work among Native Americans, which started in the wilderness of New Hampshire with only a log cabin, some temporary shelters, and a makeshift tent. The motto was said to evoke the image of Dr. Wheelock leading the morning and evening prayers in the open air, when "the surrounding forest for the first time reverberated the solemn sounds of supplication and praise."

The Hebrew words on the original seal, El Shaddai, mean "God Almighty". The exact manner in which the Hebrew motto was selected is unknown. The accuracy of the Hebrew calligraphy in the seal was occasionally challenged by Hebrew scholars.

== History and revisions ==
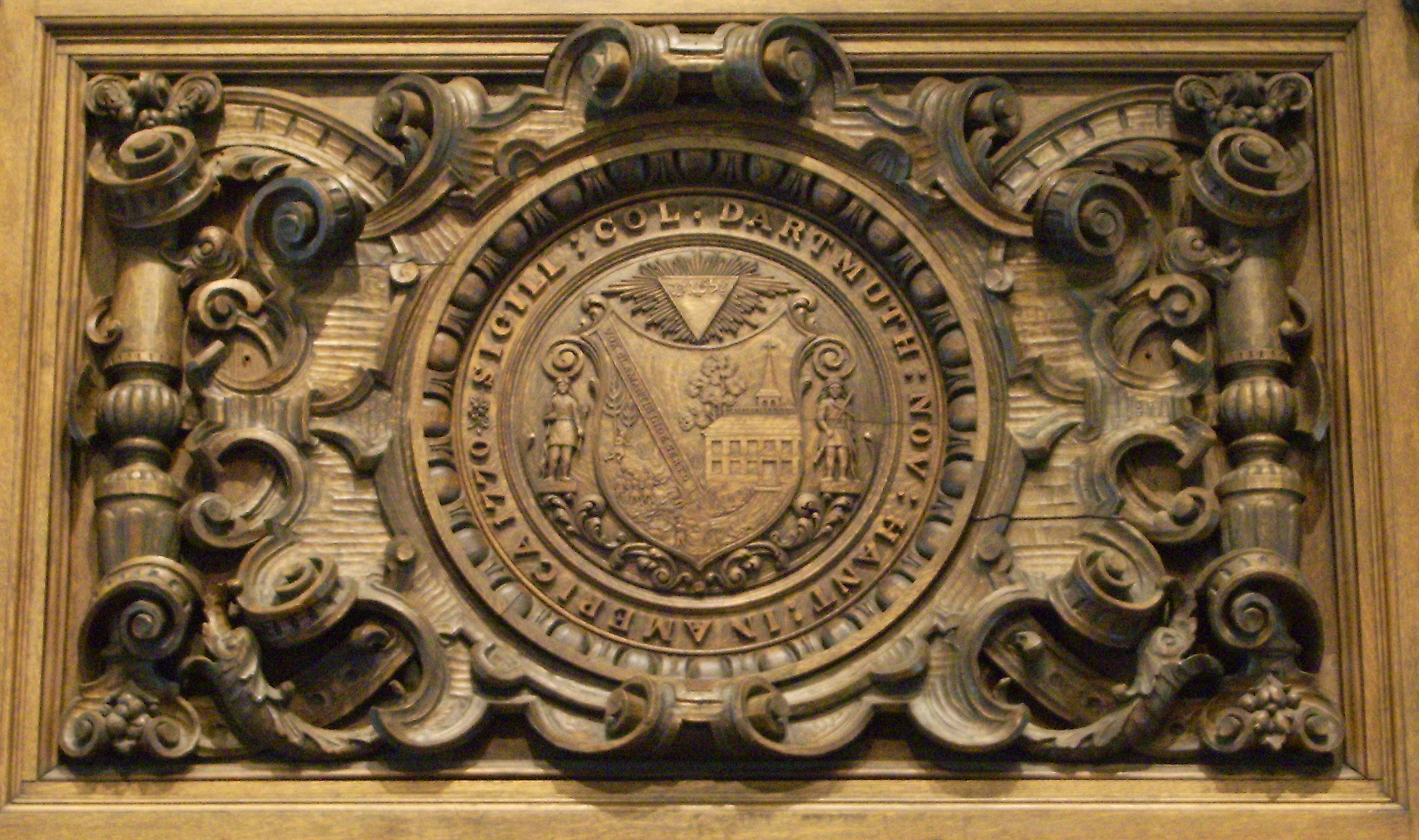
The Seal as engraved in Collis Commonground, originally known as Commons

=== Trustees of Dartmouth College v. Woodward ===
College secretary and treasurer William Woodward withheld the seal from the College trustees along with the charter and four account books after the state of New Hampshire purported to take over the operation of Dartmouth College, renaming it Dartmouth University. The Trustees of Dartmouth College v. Woodward case named Woodward as the defendant and technically sought to recover the items that he had refused to relinquish, even after he joined the University camp. The United States Supreme Court ruled in favor of the College trustees, thus returning the seal to its possession.

=== Revisions ===
In 1876, the College switched from having its seal impress wax to having it impress paper. This required a second, "male" die to fit under the original. The seal design was also carved in sandstone on the exterior of Rollins Chapel in 1886 (see above) and in wood on the interior of Commons in the Collis Center in 1901 (see right).

On October 28, 1926, the trustees affirmed the charter's reservation of the seal for official corporate documents alone. The College Publications Committee under Ray Nash commissioned typographer W. A. Dwiggins to create a line-drawing version of the seal in 1940 that saw widespread use. Dwiggins remarked at the time that he had done his best, considering that the seal had "a desperately bad design to start with – as a design". The simplified shield design included only two Native Americans reading a book, and single pine tree representing the "Lone Pine", a tree that was planted around when Dartmouth was founded, but was cut down in 1895.

Dwiggins' design was modified during 1957 to change the date from "1770" to "1769," to align with the date of the College Charter. The trustees commissioned a new set of dies with a date of "1769" to replace the old dies, now badly worn after almost two hundred years of use. For decades, the 1957 design continued to be used under trademark number 2305032.

=== Updated logo ===
In January 2018, Dartmouth College introduced a new simplified logo called the "D-Pine", which has an image of the Lone Pine on a green letter "D". College officials said at the time that they were not forbidding use of the shield, but pointed out that compatibility with social media platforms had become important. The D-Pine was praised for eliminating the "assimilationist" imagery of Native Americans that was present in the crest design, but was also criticized for its "corporate" feel.

== See also ==
- Heraldry of Columbia University
- Heraldry of Harvard University
