= Coat of arms of the University of Chicago =

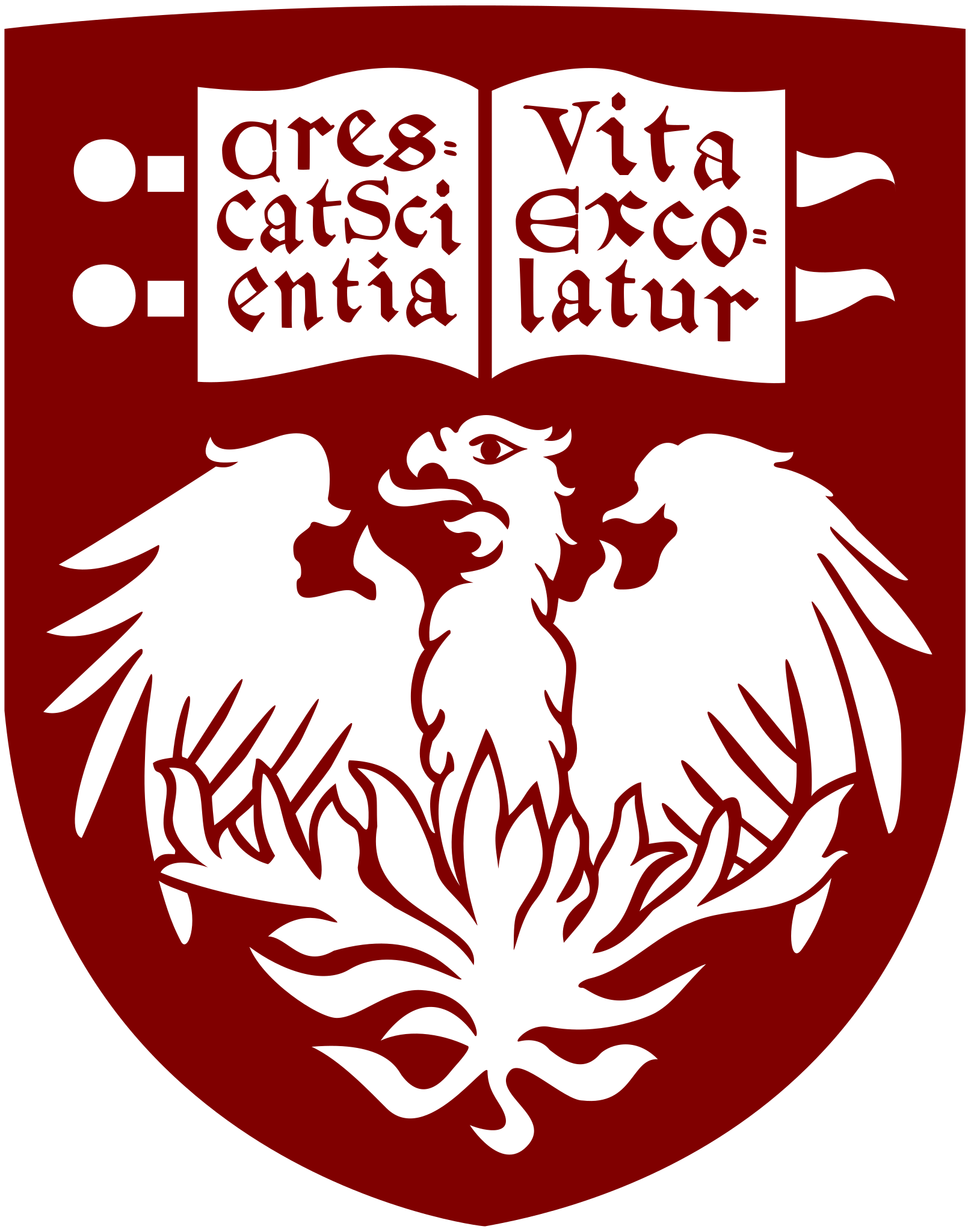
- Armiger: University of Chicago
- Adopted: August 15, 1910
- Shield: Argent, a phoenix displayed gules, langued azure, in flame proper. On a chief gules, a book expanded proper, edged and bound or. On dexter page of book the words, Crescat Scientia, inscribed, three lines in pesse sable. On sinister page the words, Vita Excolatur, inscribed, three lines in pesse sable.

The coat of arms of the University of Chicago is the assumed heraldic achievement of the University of Chicago.

== History ==
The coat of arms of the University of Chicago was assumed by resolution of the university's board of trustees on August 15, 1910. The blazon was devised by Pierre de Chaignon la Rose, working under the direction of university architect Charles Coolidge. An initial version had the book appearing without the division of the chief, however, it was noted that this would make it appear as though the book itself were being burned; the final version placed the book in chief to avoid this appearance. The arms were modified the following year with the addition of the motto Crescat scientia; vita excolatur on the pages of the open book in chief.

Since 2012, the University of Chicago uses a modified version of its arms which eliminates the chief and makes the book appear suspended directly over the flame-engulfed Phoenix. The tinctures are also suppressed to two: Gules and Argent. This modified version of the arms, when used in tandem with the university's wordmark, comprise the logo.

== Design ==
=== Blazon ===
Argent, a phoenix displayed gules, langued azure, in flame proper. On a chief gules, a book expanded proper, edged and bound or. On dexter page of book the words, Crescat Scientia, inscribed, three lines in pesse sable. On sinister page the words, Vita Excolatur, inscribed, three lines in pesse sable.

=== Meaning ===
According to the University of Chicago, "no surviving documents make clear precisely why the phoenix was adopted as the central element on the Coat of Arms, although several possibilities have been suggested". It has been hypothesized that the phoenix either signifies the "rebirth" of the University of Chicago, recalling an earlier - but unrelated - University of Chicago that existed in the city from 1856 to 1886, or it may represent the City of Chicago which was heavily damaged by the Great Chicago Fire.

== See also ==
- Heraldry
