= Herr, deine Güt ist unbegrenzt =

Catholic hymn by Maria Luise Thurmair

- Christian hymn
- English: Lord, your goodness is unlimited
- Text: by Maria Luise Thurmair
- Language: German
- Based on: Psalm 36
- Melody: "O Mensch, bewein dein Sünde groß"
- Published: 1971

"Herr, deine Güt ist unbegrenzt" (Lord, your goodness is unlimited) is a Catholic hymn by Maria Luise Thurmair, based on Psalm 36 and set to a 1525 melody by Matthäus Greitner, the same as "O Mensch, bewein dein Sünde groß". The hymn in two stanzas of twelve lines was written in 1971. It appeared in the Catholic hymnal Gotteslob in 1975 as GL 289. In the current Gotteslob is GL 427, in the section "Vertrauen und Trost" (Trust and consolation).

It is one of the Psalmenlieder (psalm songs), which can be used in the Catholic liturgic instead of the psalm chant between the readings from the Old Testament and the New Testament. The song has been recommended for multi-religious events that Christians, Jews and Muslims attend together.

== Bibliography ==
- "Psalmenlieder" (in German). Diocese of Augsburg.
- "Herr, deine Güte ist unbegrenzt (L) / Leben in Gott - Vertrauen und Trost" (in German). mein-gotteslob.de.
- "Religiöse Gesänge / für Feiern, an denen Christen, Juden und Muslime teilnehmen" (in German). liturgie.de.
