= Urim and Thummim =

Objects used for divination in the early Abrahamic religions

The Urim (Hebrew: אוּרִים ʾŪrīm, "lights") and the Thummim (Hebrew: תֻּמִּים Tummīm, "perfection" or "truth") in the Hebrew Bible are elements of the hoshen, the breastplate worn by the High Priest attached to the ephod, a type of apron or garment. The pair are used frequently in the Old Testament, in Exodus 28:30 and Leviticus 8:8 through God's instruction to Aaron on how to adorn his breastplate worn in the holy place; in 1 Samuel 14:41 by King Saul to determine who was at fault for breaking the army's fast; and Ezra 2 to determine whether those who claimed to be the descendants of the priests of Israel were truly of that class. The Urim and Thummim are sometimes connected by scholars with cleromancy (with divination by casting lots), although it is equally likely no casting was physically done, and the participants in the ritual waited for a sign to answer a question or reveal the will of God.

== Name and meaning ==
Urim (אוּרִים) traditionally has been taken to derive from a root meaning "lights"; these derivations are reflected in the Neqqudot of the Masoretic Text. In consequence, Urim and Thummim has traditionally been translated as "lights and perfections" (by Theodotion, for example), or, by taking the phrase allegorically, as meaning "revelation and truth" or "doctrine and truth." It appears in this form in the Vulgate, in the writing of St. Jerome, and in the Hexapla. The latter use was defended in modern Catholic interpretations by connecting Urim and Thummim to the roots ירה "to teach" and אׇמַן "be true".

Thummim (תוּמִים) is widely considered to be derived from the consonantal root ת.מ.ם (t-m-m) "innocent". Many scholars now believe that Urim (אוּרִים) simply derives from the Hebrew אּרּרִים (Arrim) "curses" and thus that Urim and Thummim essentially means "cursed or faultless", in reference to the deity's judgment of an accused person; in other words, Urim and Thummim were used to answer the question "innocent or guilty".

Assyriologist William Muss-Arnolt connected the singular forms—ur and tumm—with the Babylonian terms ūrtu and tamītu, meaning "oracle" and "command", respectively. According to his theory, the Hebrew words use a pluralis intensivus to enhance their apparent majesty, not to indicate the presence of more than one. Along these lines, the Urim and Thummim are hypothesized to derive from the Tablet of Destinies worn by Marduk on his breast according to Babylonian religion. (Note: 1 Samuel 28:3–6 mentions three methods of divine communication – dreams, prophets, and the Urim and Thummim; the first two of these are also mentioned copiously in Assyrian and Babylonian literature, and such literature also mentions a Tablet of Destinies, which is similar in some ways to the Urim and Thummim. The Tablet of Destinies had to rest on the breast of deities mediating between the other gods and mankind in order to function, while the Urim and Thummim had to rest within the breastplate of the priest mediating between God and mankind. Marduk was said to have put his seal on the Tablets of Destiny, while the Israelite breastplate had a jewelled stone upon it for each of the Israelite tribes, which may derive from the same principle. Like the Urim and Thummim, the Tablet of Destinies came into use when the fate of king and nation was concerned. According to some archaeologists, the Israelites emerged as a subculture from within Canaanite society, not as an invading force from outside, and therefore it would be natural for them to have used similar religious practices to other Semitic nations; such scholars suspect that the concept of Urim and Thummim was originally derived from the Tablet of Destinies.)

== Form and function ==
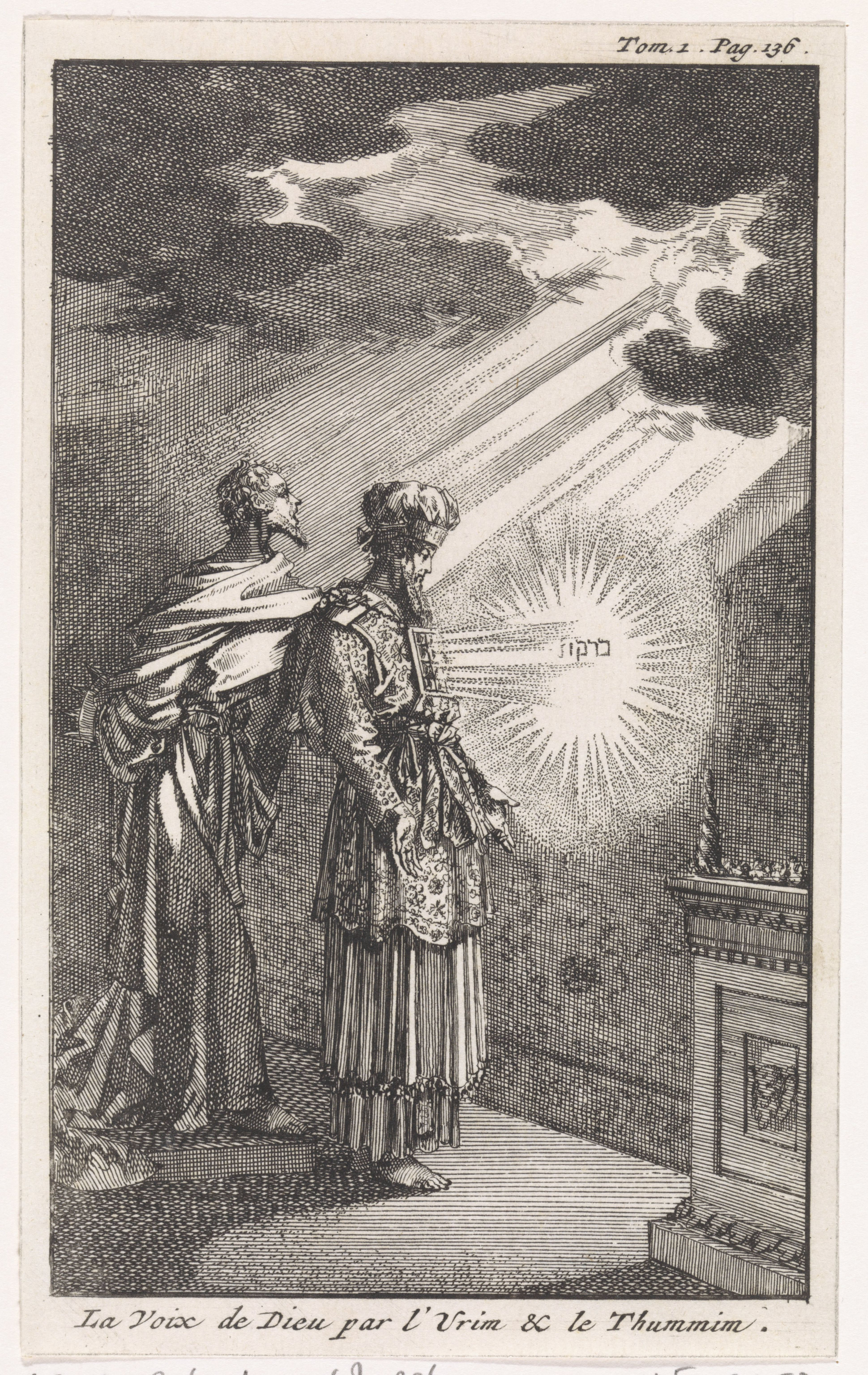
"God speaks through the Urim and Thummim," 1705 engraving by Jan Luyken. The breastplate projects the word ברקת (barakat, "emerald").

1 Samuel 14:41 is regarded by biblical scholars as key to understanding the Urim and Thummim; the passage describes an attempt to identify a sinner by repeatedly splitting the people into two groups and identifying which group contains the sinner. In the version of this passage in the Masoretic Text, it describes Saul and Jonathan being separated from the rest of the people, and lots being cast between them; the Septuagint version, however, states that Urim would indicate Saul and Jonathan, while Thummim would indicate the people. In the Septuagint, a previous verse uses a phrase which is usually translated as "inquired of God", which is significant as the grammatical form of the Hebrew implies that the inquiry was performed by objects being manipulated; scholars view it as evident from these verses and versions that cleromancy was involved, and that Urim and Thummim were the names of the objects being cast.

The description of the clothing of the Hebrew high priest in the Book of Exodus portrays the Urim and Thummim as being put into the sacred breastplate, worn by the high priest over the Ephod. Where the biblical text elsewhere describes an Ephod being used, scholars presume that it is referring to use of the Urim and Thummim in conjunction with the Ephod, as this seems to be intimately connected with it; similarly where non-prophets are portrayed as asking God for guidance, and the advice is not described as given by visions, scholars think that Urim and Thummim were the medium implied. In all but two cases (1 Samuel 10:22 and 2 Samuel 5:23), the question is one which is effectively answered by a simple "yes" or "no"; a number of scholars believe that the two exceptions to this pattern, which give more complex answers, were originally also just sequences of "yes" or "no" questions, but became corrupted by later editing.

There is no description of the form of the Urim and Thummim in the passage describing the high priest's vestments, and a number of scholars believe that the author of the passage, which textual scholars attribute to the priestly source, was not actually entirely aware of what they were either. Nevertheless, the passage does describe them as being put into the breastplate, which scholars think implies they were objects put into some sort of pouch within it, and then, while out of view, one (or one side, if the Urim and Thummim was a single object) was chosen by touch and withdrawn or thrown out; since the Urim and Thummim were put inside this pouch, they were presumably small and fairly flat, and were possibly tablets of wood or of bone. Considering the scholars' conclusion that Urim essentially means "guilty" and Thummim essentially means "innocent", this would imply that the purpose of the Urim and Thummim was an ordeal to confirm or refute suspected guilt; if the Urim was selected it meant guilt, while selection of the Thummim would mean innocence.

According to classical rabbinical literature, in order for the Urim and Thummim to give an answer, it was first necessary for the individual to stand facing the fully dressed high priest, and vocalise the question briefly and in a simple way, though it was not necessary for it to be loud enough for anyone else to hear it. Maimonides explains that the High Priest would stand facing the Ark of the Covenant with the inquirer behind him, facing the Priest's back. After the inquirer asked his question, the Holy Spirit would immediately overcome the Priest and he would see the letters protruding in a prophetic vision. The Talmudic rabbis argued that Urim and Thummim were words written on the sacred breastplate. Most of the Talmudic rabbis, and Josephus, following the belief that Urim meant "lights", argued that the rituals involving Urim and Thummim involved questions being answered by great rays of light shining out of certain jewels on the breastplate; each jewel was taken to represent different letters, and the sequence of lighting thus would spell out an answer (though there were 22 letters in the Hebrew alphabet, and only 12 jewels on the breastplate); two Talmudic rabbis, however, argued that the jewels themselves moved in a way that made them stand out from the rest, or even moved themselves into groups to form words.

== History of use ==
The first reference to Urim and Thummim in the Bible is the description in the Book of Exodus concerning the high priest's vestments; the chronologically earliest passage mentioning them, according to textual scholars, is in the Book of Hosea, where it is implied, by reference to the Ephod, that the Urim and Thummim were fundamental elements in the popular form of the Israelite religion, in the mid 8th century BC. Consulting the Urim and Thummim was said to be permitted for determining territorial boundaries, and was said to be required, in addition to permission from the king or a prophet, if there was an intention to expand Jerusalem or the Temple in Jerusalem; however, these rabbinical sources questioned, or at least tried to justify, why Urim and Thummim would be required when a prophet was also present. The classical rabbinical writers argued that the Urim and Thummim were only permitted to be consulted by very prominent figures such as army generals, the most senior of court figures, and kings, and the only questions which could be raised were those which were asked for the benefit of the people as a whole. To uncover the sin of Achan the sacred Lots were used by Joshua. Abiathar joined David, who was then in the cave of Adullam (1 Sam. 22:20–23, 23:6). He remained with David, and became priest of the party of which he was the leader (1 Sam. 30:7). When David ascended the throne of Judah, Abiathar was appointed High Priest (1 Chr. 15:11; 1 Kings 2:26) and the "king's counselor" (1 Chr. 27:33–34). Meanwhile, Zadok, of the house of Eleazar, had been made High Priest. According to the Jewish Encyclopedia Abiathar was deposed from office when he was deserted by the Holy Spirit without which the Urim and Thummin could not be consulted.

Although Josephus argues that the Urim and Thummim continued to function until the era of the Maccabees, Talmudic sources are unanimous in agreeing that the Urim and Thummim stopped functioning much earlier, when Jerusalem was sacked by the Babylonians. In a passage from the part of the Book of Ezra which overlaps with the Book of Nehemiah, it is mentioned that individuals who were unable to prove, after the Babylonian captivity had ended, that they were descended from the priesthood before the captivity began, were required to wait until priests in possession of Urim and Thummim were discovered; this would appear to confirm the statements in the Talmud that the Urim and Thummim had by then been lost. Indeed, since the priestly source, which textual scholars date to a couple of centuries prior to the captivity, does not appear to know what the Urim and Thummim looked like, and there is no mention of the Urim and Thummim in the deuteronomic history beyond the death of David, scholars suspect that use of them decayed some time before the Babylonian conquest, probably as a result of the growing influence of prophets at that time.

Maimonides states that in the Second Temple the Urim and Thummim actually existed but no longer functioned in the practical sense since the priests no longer possessed the Holy Spirit. Rabbi Abraham ben David disagrees and maintains that during that era, the Urim and Thummim were completely absent.

According to the ancient apocryphal Lives of the Prophets, after the death of Zechariah ben Jehoiada, the priests of the Temple could no longer see the apparitions of the angel of the Lord, make divinations with the Ephod, or give responses from the Holy of Holies.

== Latter Day Saint movement ==
Joseph Smith, founder of the Latter Day Saint movement, said that he used interpreters in order to translate the Book of Mormon from the golden plates. In early accounts, Smith described the interpreters as "spectacles", described as two transparent stones set in silver bows. The earliest association of the spectacles with the biblical term "Urim and Thummim" occurred in 1833 and Smith appears to have adopted the term in subsequent descriptions. The Urim and Thummim were said to have been found with the golden plates, a breastplate (to which the silver bows were attached in some descriptions), and the Sword of Laban. Smith's mother, Lucy Mack Smith, described these Urim and Thummim as being like "two smooth three-cornered diamonds." Smith and others also referred to individual seer stones also associated with Smith's dictation of the Book of Mormon as Urim and Thummim, although his wife, Emma Smith, in her later accounts distinguished between the seer stones and the Urim and Thummim.

Smith also said he used the Urim and Thummim to assist him in receiving other divine revelations, including some of the sections of the Doctrine and Covenants and portions of the Joseph Smith Translation of the Bible. Only Oliver Cowdery is claimed to have attempted to use them to receive his own revelation. Many Latter Day Saints believe that Smith's Urim and Thummim were functionally identical to the biblical Urim and Thummim.

Smith extended the use of the term "Urim and Thummim" to describe the dwelling place of God, the earth in a future state, and the white stone mentioned in the Book of Revelation.

== In popular culture ==
Yale University coat of arms, with Urim and Thummim shown in Hebrew letters on an open book

In accordance with the belief that Urim and Thummim translates to "Light and Truth", the Latin equivalent Lux et Veritas has been used for several university mottoes. For example, Lux et Veritas is the motto of Yale University, Indiana University and the University of Montana. Similarly, Northeastern University's motto is Lux, Veritas, Virtus ("Light, Truth, Virtue"). Urim and Thummim itself is emblazoned in Hebrew across the open book pictured on the Yale University coat of arms, and the translation Lux et Veritas appears below on a banner.

The Urim and Thummim are also mentioned in some modern fiction:

- Short story The Jew's Breastplate in collection Tales of Terror and Mystery by Arthur Conan Doyle.
- Urim and Thummim were the names given to two objects of mystical technology in the Prosopopeia transmedia series, culminating in the International Emmy Award-winning participatory drama series The Truth About Marika by SVT and The company P.
- In the television series Dig, the breastplate that is a part of the mystery is said to be the breastplate of the High Priest of the Temple in Jerusalem and used to communicate with God.
- In Paulo Coelho's 1988 novel The Alchemist, Urim and Thummim are black and white fortune-telling stones that Melchizedek gives to Santiago, with their colors representing “yes” and “no” answers to questions.
- In John Bellairs’ young adult novel The Revenge of the Wizard’s Ghost, the two main characters go in search of the Urim and Thummim, imagined as stones with healing powers.
- In The Object – The Urim and Thummim (2007), a documentary directed by Jacob Young, "The story of a musician's fascinating discovery of an ancient relic, as he attempts to seek its mysterious significance and share the artifact with the world."
- In the visual novel series Misericorde, Urim and Thummim are the names of a pair of swords that are central to the mysteries and symbolism of the story.
- In the video game from 2024 Banishers: Ghosts of New Eden, Urim and Thummim are the names of a pair of black and white stones mentioned and shown in one of the mysteries of a story quest.

== See also ==
- Cleromancy: the drawing of lots for the purpose of divination
- Divination: ascertaining information by supernatural means
- Dice: polyhedral objects used to randomize decisions
- Oracle: person or object used to obtain information via prophecy or clairvoyance
- Scrying: obtaining supernatural knowledge by means of an object
