= Richard Nance =

American musician

Dr. Richard Nance is an American musician. He is a former professor of music and conductor of the Choir of the West at Pacific Lutheran University in Tacoma, Washington, United States.

== Education ==
Nance holds bachelors and master's degrees from West Texas A&M (then West Texas State University) and the Doctor of Musical Arts degree from Arizona State University. Dr. Nance has studied conducting with Hugh Sanders, Douglas McEwen and David Stocker, and studied composition with Joseph Nelson and Randall Shinn.

== Career ==
Prior to moving to Washington, he taught for seven years at Amarillo College in Amarillo, Texas. Nance joined the faculty of Pacific Lutheran University originally as associate director of choral activities in 1992. For fifteen years he conducted the University Chorale, University Singers and Choral Union. Under Nance’s direction, all three of these choirs were chosen to sing at ACDA conventions (1996, 1998, 2000, 2003, 2006), and the Choral Union twice toured to Europe. Upon Kathryn Lehmann’s departure from PLU in 2006, Nance was named Director of Choral Activities and conductor of the Choir of the West. He led the choir’s tour to Romania, Bulgaria and Hungary in 2007, and the tour to Germany and France in 2011. That tour featured performances at the Harmonie Festival in Lindenholzhausen, Germany, a world competition that takes place once every six years. Under Nance’s direction the Choir of the West appeared at the 2009 Northwest MENC Conference, and the choir has been selected to appear at the 2012 Northwestern Division Conference of the American Choral Directors Association., where he directed the University Chorale, University Singers and Choral Union and taught music education courses and private composition. In January 2007, he was appointed director of choral activities and conductor of The Choir of the West at PLU. Under Nance's direction the Choir of the West has become recognized as one of the best collegiate choirs in the nation. The Choir of the West won First place in the Anton Bruckner choral festival in the summer of 2015, and in the 2015 - 2016 school year the choir sang the St. Matthews passion with Soprano Angela Meade, and performed at the NCCO conference with Simon Carrington as a guest director and mentor.

On May 9, 2021, Dr. Nance announced his plans to retire from PLU following the 2021-22 academic year. He conducted his final concert with the Choir of the West on May 3, 2022. In September 2022, Dr. Brian Galante became the seventh conductor of the choir, having previously conducted University Chorale. The Chorale and University Singers are currently conducted by Dr. Raul Dominguez. Although he’s no longer teaching at PLU, Nance still co-conducts the PLU Choral Union - a community choir composed of Choir of the West alumni and current members of the group - with Dominguez.

Dr. Nance is an active member of the American Choral Directors Association, presently serving as state president for Washington and as the Choral Review Editor for the Choral Journal. Three choirs under his direction have appeared at ACDA regional conventions. Dr. Nance also serves as director of music at St. Mary's Episcopal Church of Lakewood, Washington, and is active as a clinician and adjudicator.

== Works ==
Dr. Nance has written a number of compositions for the choirs of Pacific Lutheran University, Arizona State University, high school choirs and church choirs. His works are published by Walton Music and Hinshaw Music, and are performed widely throughout the United States.

=== Set Me As A Seal ===
Set Me As A Seal was Nance's second publication with Walton Music. It was composed for the wedding of Richard Sparks and Kathryn Wold, July 6, 1996. It is set for an SATB (also available in SSAA) chorus with piano (or organ) and French Horn. The text, taken from Song of Solomon, is as follows:

"Set me as a seal upon your heart, for love is a strong as death. Many waters cannot quench love, neither can floods drown it."

=== Credo ===
The three movement Credo was written in 1996, and was originally scored for piano and oboe.

=== Mass for a New Millennium ===
Composed for and premiered by The Choir of the West, the premier choral ensemble at Pacific Lutheran University, in 2000 and recorded by PLU Multimedia Recordings. The Mass includes the three-part Credo previously published. The remaining movements of the mass were composed at the request of Dr. Sparks for a recording the choir was undertaking in 2000, to showcase the new organ that had been installed in the university’s famed Lagerquist Concert Hall. This formed a 43-minute work in ten movements.

=== Other choral works ===
Song title	Voicing
A Child, My Choice	SATB divisi
Credo (a three-movement piece)	SATB
Hodie Christus Natus Est	SSAA
Like as The Hart Desireth The Waterbrook	SATB
Magnificat	SSAATTBB, a cappella
Songs of a Young Man	TTBB

== Performances and recordings ==
Mass for a New Millennium was composed during the 1999-2000 academic year and was premiered by the Pacific Lutheran University Choir of the West, conducted by Richard Sparks on May 30, 2000. PLU Multimedia Recordings presented the premiere recording on compact disc in 2000.

In 2002, Nance conducted the PLU Choral Union tour of Europe and at the World Harp Congress in Geneva, Switzerland, where his Mass for the New Millennium was a featured work.

The Brighton Secondary School Concert Choir recorded the Credo in Adelaide, South Australia in 2005.

In November 2011, two Washington Lutheran churches presented the Cora Voce-Mass for a New Millennium program featuring Nance's Mass.

The Senior Choir of Fairlawn Avenue United Church in Toronto, Canada presented Mass for a New Millennium on April 28, 2013, under the direction Eleanor Daley.

== Recognition ==
Nance was selected by the American Choral Directors Association to write the Raymond W. Brock memorial composition for 2002 (Psalm 36, published by Walton Music) and was also commissioned by the Washington Music Educators Association to compose a piece for the 2002 All-State Choir.
