= Pierre de Chaignon la Rose =

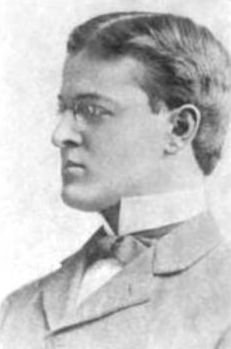
- Born: April 23, 1871; New York City, New York, U.S.
- Died: February 21, 1941 (aged 69); Cambridge, Massachusetts, U.S.
- Education: Philips Exeter Academy; Harvard University (B.A., 1895)
- Occupations: Academic; heraldic designer and artist

Pierre de Chaignon la Rose (April 23, 1871 – February 21, 1941) was an American heraldist and heraldic artist.

== Biography ==
Pierre de Chaignon la Rose was born on April 23, 1871, in New York City, New York. His father was Anthime F. la Rose, and his mother Katharine Kappus von Pichlstein.

La Rose studied at Exeter Academy and subsequently Harvard University, from which he graduated with a Bachelor of Arts in 1895. He was a member of Phi Beta Kappa, supposedly "without ever taking a single lecture-note". He also served as editor of the Harvard Monthly, and was a member of Hasty Pudding and Signet. His roommate at Harvard was Daniel Gregory Mason, who described him in the following terms:

Of all my friends he had the surest nose for the best, whether in letters, music, the graphic arts, or the more general arts of life ... His style in college essays and stories was fairly Jamesian. He could draw exquisite book-plates. As for his piano-playing, I can see him yet at our upright, stocky but erect in shirt-sleeves and red hair ...

He taught at Harvard in the English department for seven years following his graduation, resigning his teaching post in 1902. By 1915, La Rose would describe his occupation as a "man of letters", busying himself with critical literary work and graphic design while making trips to Europe, Mexico, and Turkey.

A fervent Catholic, La Rose was an expert on ecclesiastical heraldry, and designed the coats of arms of many American Catholic prelates. He also designed arms for institutions both Catholic and secular, including The Catholic University of America, Saint Anselm College and Rice University. For example, he designed the seals of all the graduate schools at Harvard University and served on its Committee on Arms, Seal, and Diplomas, while also designing armorial bearings for Princeton, Yale, and Radcliffe College. He also designed the flag of the Episcopal Church between 1937 and 1940.

He was a friend of philosopher George Santayana.

A 1941 recollection of him in the Harvard Crimson noted his dignified presence on campus in his later years, but also his isolation and loneliness; La Rose never married. He died on February 21, 1941, at Wyman Cambridge Hospital in Cambridge, Massachusetts.

== Armorial bearings designed ==
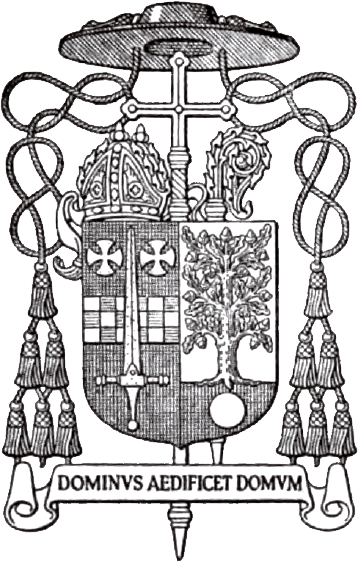
La Rose designed the coat of arms of Regis Canevin, Bishop of Pittsburgh, in 1915.

La Rose designed the armorial bearings for the following persons and institutions:

Coat of arms of the University of Notre Dame

=== Institutions ===
- The Catholic University of America
- Duquesne University (modified and approved)
- Harvard University's Graduate Schools
- Lancaster Catholic High School
- Rice University
- Roman Catholic Archdiocese of Dubuque
- Roman Catholic Archdiocese of Los Angeles
- Roman Catholic Archdiocese of New Orleans
- Roman Catholic Diocese of Natchez (now suppressed)
- Roman Catholic Diocese of Pittsburgh
- Roman Catholic Diocese of Saint Augustine
- Roman Catholic Diocese of Saint Cloud
- Roman Catholic Diocese of Toledo
- Saint Anselm Abbey Shield, which is also a part of the modern day seal of Saint Anselm College in Goffstown, New Hampshire.
- St. Edward Seminary
- St. Joseph's College for Women
- Coat of arms of the University of Notre Dame
- University of Chicago
- Dominican Province of St. Joseph

=== Persons ===
- James Blenk (1856–1917), Archbishop of New Orleans
- Joseph Francis Busch (1866–1953), Bishop of Saint Cloud
- Regis Canevin (1853–1927), Bishop of Pittsburgh
- John Patrick Carroll (1864–1925), Bishop of Helena
- Michael Joseph Curley (1879–1947), Bishop of Saint Augustine
- Dennis Joseph Dougherty (1865–1951), Archbishop of Philadelphia
- John Edward Gunn (1863–1924), Bishop of Natchez
- James Keane (1857–1929), Archbishop of Dubuque
- Joseph Schrembs (1866–1945), Bishop of Toledo
