= Coat of arms of Yale University =

Arms of Yale University
- Armiger: Yale University
- Adopted: 1746; 280 years ago
- Shield: Azure an open book Argent edges Or charged with the Hebrew words אורים וְתּמִים Sable.
- Motto: Lux et Veritas

The Yale University coat of arms is the primary emblem of Yale University. It has a field of the color Yale Blue with an open book and the Hebrew words Urim and Thummim inscribed upon it in Hebrew letters. Below the shield on a scroll appears Yale's official motto, Lux et Veritas (Latin for "Light and Truth").

== History ==
The first known seal of Yale appears on the master's diploma of its future president Ezra Stiles in 1746. In addition to the Hebrew words "Urim ve'Thummim" inscribed on an open book on a shield, it had the Latin words Lux et Veritas surrounding the shield.

The Hebrew words Urim and Thummim are used due to a belief among scholars at the time that "Light and Truth" was an adequate translation for these words. According to the Hebrew Bible, the priests used tools called the Urim and Thummim to discern the will of God.

== See also ==
- Urim and Thummim
- Heraldry of Columbia University
- Heraldry of Harvard University
