= Heraldry of Columbia University =

Seal and coat of arms of Columbia University

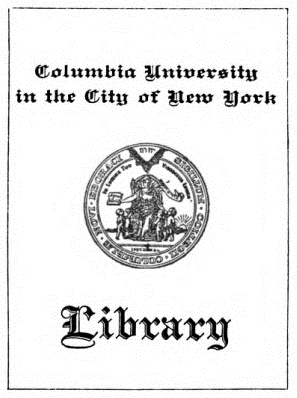
A bookplate displaying the seal of Columbia University

Columbia University represents itself using several symbols, including a university seal and a coat of arms. The seal was first adopted in 1755, shortly after the university's founding, and with few variations continues to be used today. The coat of arms was adopted by the university in 1949. Additionally, the individual schools of Columbia possess their own logos, most of which contain some variant of the King's Crown symbol. Exceptions to this rule include the College of Physicians and Surgeons, which in addition to a logo adopted a variant of the university seal, and the School of General Studies, which inaugurated its own coat of arms in 1950 based on the Columbia arms.

The King's Crown is one of the most popular and pervasive symbols of the university, and it is currently used as the school's official logo. It traces its roots back to a copper crown that once surmounted Columbia's first building, and since the early 20th century, it has become a frequent design motif on campus and closely tied to the university's identity. It is incorporated into the logos of most of the university's individual schools, with the exception of the College of Physicians and Surgeons, the School of General Studies, Columbia Business School, and the Graduate School of Arts and Sciences.

== University seal ==
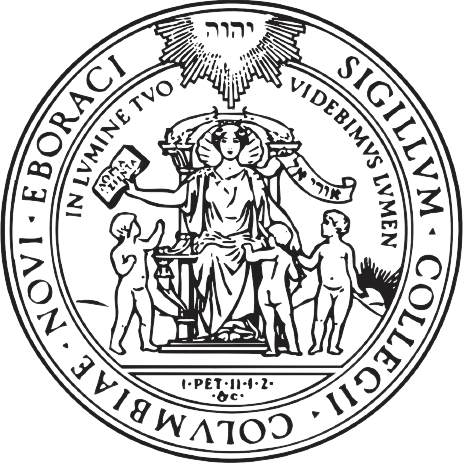
The seal of Columbia University

=== Description ===
The seal was described in its adoption as follows:

The College is represented by a Lady sitting in a Throne or Chair of State, with Severall Children at her Knees to represent the Pupils, with I Peter II., 1, 2, &c., under them to express the Temper with which they should apply Themselves to seek for True Wisdom... One of the [New-born Babes] She takes by the hand with her left hand expressing her benevolent design of Conducting them to true Wisdom and Virtue. To which purpose She holds open to the a Book in her right hand in which is [in] Greek letters "λόγια ζῶντα", the living or lively Oracles, which is the Epithet that St. Stephen gives to the Holy scriptures—Acts. 7:38. Out of her Mouth over her left Shoulder goes a Label with these words in Hebrew Letters ori-el [אוּרִיאֵל], God is my light; alluding to Ps. 27:1. expressing her Acknowledgment of God the Father of Lights, as the Fountain of all that Light, both Natural and Revealed with which She proposes to enlighten or instruct her Children or Pupils; whereof the Sun rising under the Label is the Emblem or Hieroglyphic, alluding to that expression Mal. IV, 2., The Sun of Righteousness arising with healing in his Wings. Over her head is Jehovah [יהוה] in a Glory, the Beams coming triangularly to a Point near her head, with these words around her for her motto, In Lumine Tuo Videbimus Lumen—In thy light shall we see light Ps. 36:9. On the Edge around are engraved in Capitals, Sigillum Collegii Reg. Nov. Ebor. in America—The Seal of King's College at New York in America.

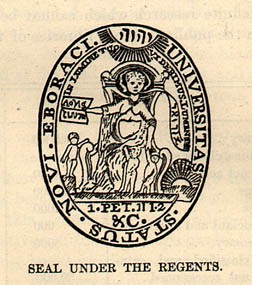
The seal from 1784 to 1787

The text around the seal has changed multiple times to reflect changes in the university's status. Following American independence, the name of the university was changed from King's College to Columbia College. Under the Regents from 1784 to 1787, when Columbia served as the state university of New York, the text read universitas · status · novi · eboraci, meaning "State University of New York". When Columbia reverted to being a private institution, the text was changed again to say sigillum · collegii · columbiae · novi · eboraci, meaning "The Seal of Columbia College of New York". When Columbia was renamed again to Columbia University in 1896, however, the text around the seal was not changed.

The seal of the Columbia University Vagelos College of Physicians and Surgeons is identical to that of the university, but contains an extra outer ring of text which reads columbia · university · college · of · physicians · and · surgeons.

=== History ===
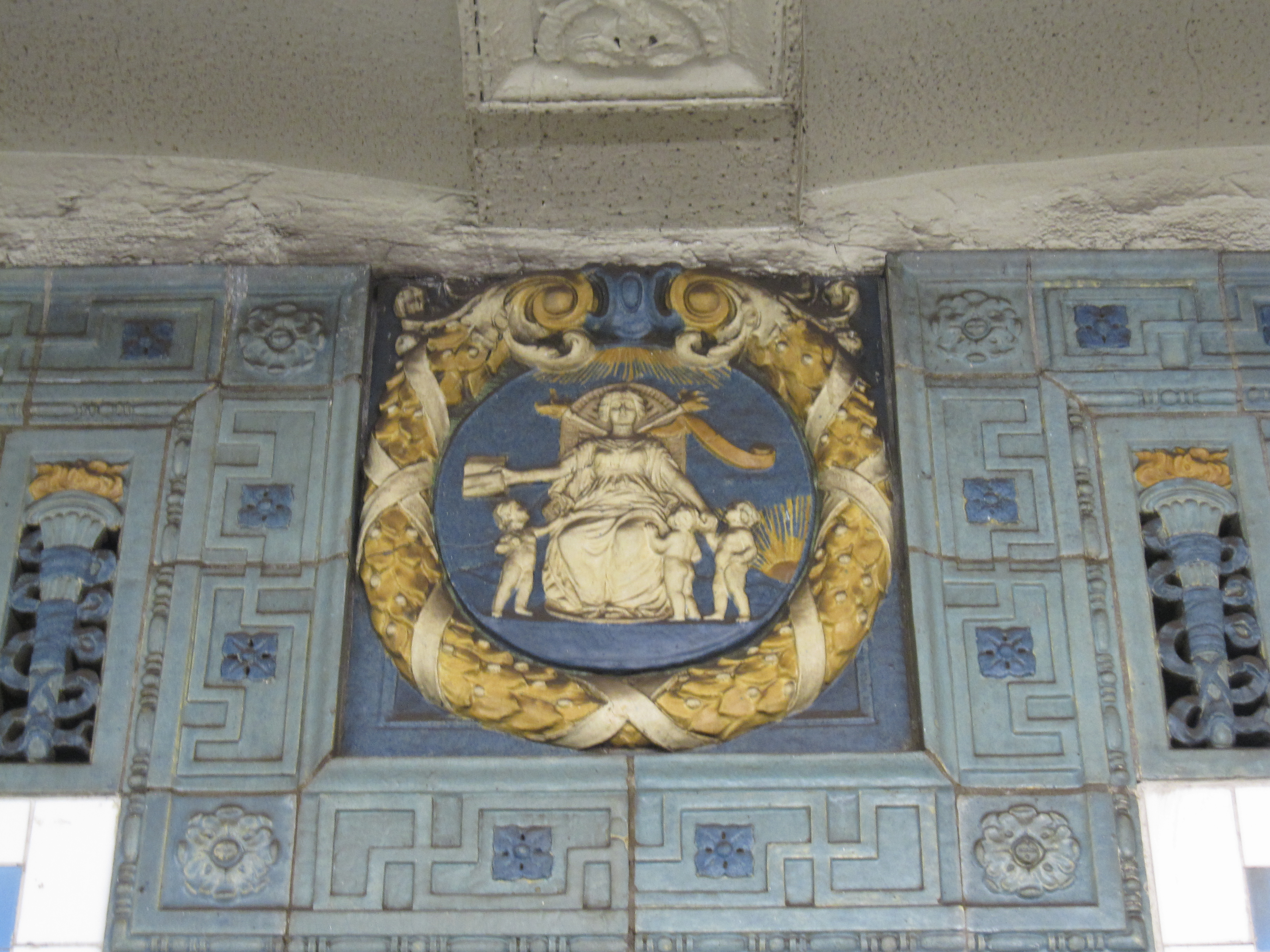
A faience plaque of the university seal at the 116th Street–Columbia University station

The seal was adopted by the Columbia University Board of Trustees on June 3, 1755, one year after the university's founding, making it Columbia's oldest symbol. It was designed by Columbia's first president, Samuel Johnson. The use of the seal is restricted to the trustees, and is used to authenticate its official acts. The seal appears in several places on Columbia's campus, notably on the floor at the entrance of Low Memorial Library, on the back of the statue Alma Mater, and in several locations in Butler Library. The depiction of the seal on the back of Alma Mater is supported by two infants holding torches, and has a King's Crown as a crest. Additionally, the seal is used as a decorative motif at the New York City Subway's 116th Street–Columbia University station.^{,}

The Columbia seal is noted for its intricacy, and was the first instance in which both Latin and Greek (as well as Hebrew) were used on a college or university seal. It may have served as an inspiration for the seal of Northwestern University, in its use of an open book with Greek text on it to signify the spread of knowledge.

== Coat of arms ==
Arms of Columbia University
- Armiger: Columbia University
- Adopted: February 10, 1949; 77 years ago
- Crest: A lion's head erased Or
- Shield: Azure a chevron Argent between three king's crowns Or
- Motto: In lumine Tuo videbimus lumen (Latin for 'In Thy light shall we see light')

The coat of arms of Columbia University is the armorial bearing that has been assumed by the university.

=== Blazon ===
Azure a chevron Argent between three king's crowns Or.

=== History ===
Columbia's coat of arms is one of the newer symbols of the university, having been adopted in 1949. It was designed by three men (Milton Halsey Thomas, the curator of the university's archives, Phillip M. Hayden, the secretary of the university, and Harold H. Booth, a specialist in heraldry) in order to create a symbol for the university that could be used more freely for decorative purposes than the seal.

The blue and white colors of the official design are drawn from the traditional school colors, which were in turn taken from the Philolexian Society and the Peithologian Society, respectively. The chevron was taken from the personal coat of arms of Samuel Johnson, while the crowns on the shield represent the King's Crown, one of the oldest symbols of the university, which dates back to the school's pre-revolutionary royal origins as King's College.

While the blazon describes the shield as Azure (blue) with a chevron Argent (silver), some designs (also sanctioned by the university) have depicted the shield as a darker blue with a Columbia blue chevron (which violates the rule of tincture). In addition, some designs display crowns Argent instead of Or (gold). Older depictions of the arms may also include a crest with a lion's head erased Or, a reference to the Columbia Lion.

=== School of General Studies ===
The Columbia University School of General Studies possesses its own coat of arms, which was designed and adopted in 1950. It is described as

Azure a chevron Argent between a king's crown, and owl, and a lion's head erased crowned Or.

The motto underneath, Lux in Tenebris Lucet, meaning "The light that shines in the darkness", was taken from John 1:5, and reflected the fact that General Studies students attended classes during the night at the time of its adoption.

== King's Crown ==
=== History ===
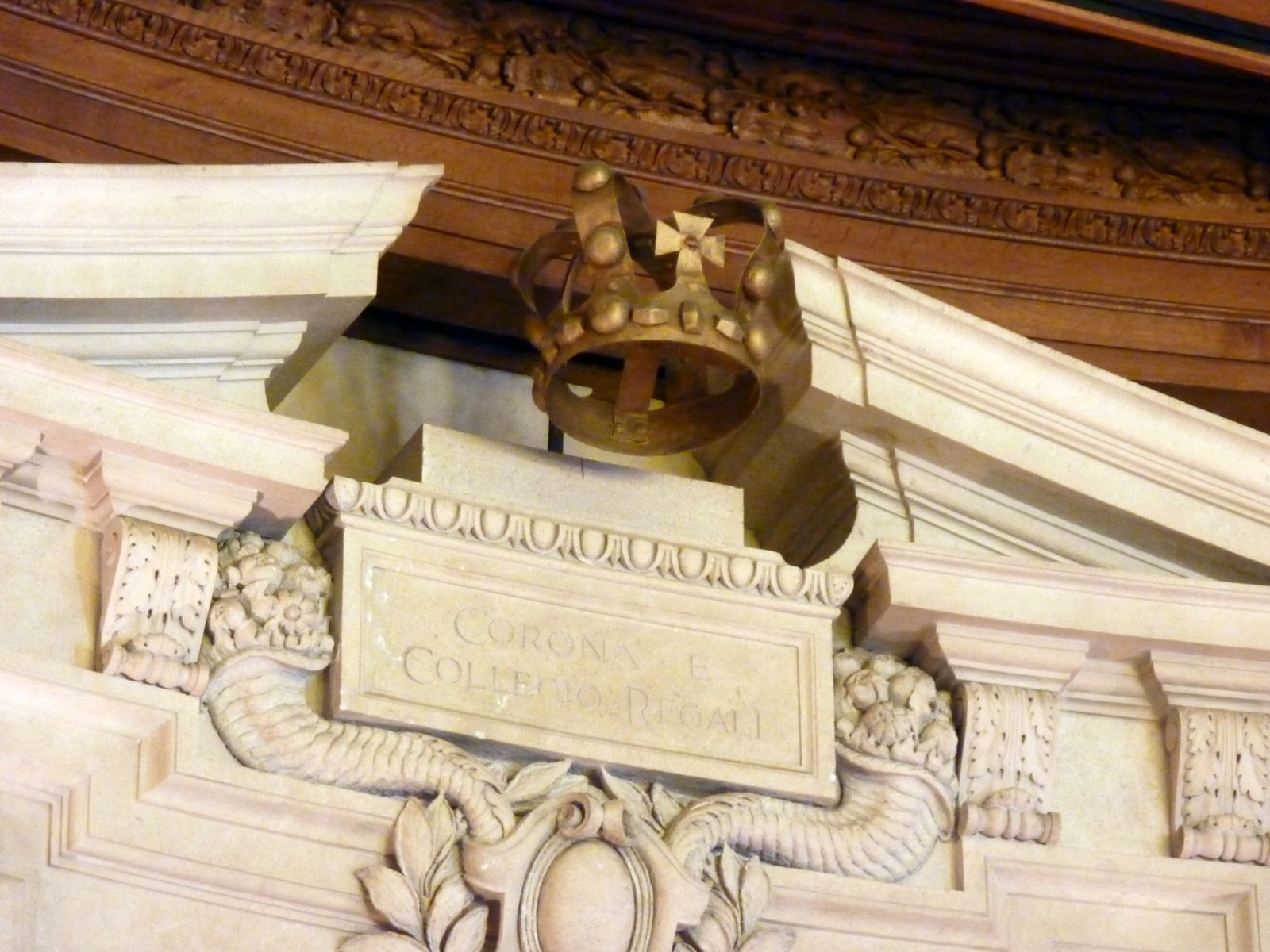
The original crown of King's College

The King's Crown is one of the most enduring symbols of Columbia, and a product of the university original relationship with the British monarchy. The symbol itself was derived from the copper crown that once sat atop the cupola of College Hall, the main building of the university's Park Place campus, which was built in 1760. Following the revolution, the university preserved the crown, whose royal image has been a source of irony. When it was shown to Stratford Canning, 1st Viscount Stratford de Redcliffe, the British envoy extraordinary and minister plenipotentiary to the United States, in 1820, he reportedly remarked to a professor: "You should preserve that crown carefully, sir, for you republicans will by-and-by need a crown." The crown currently resides in the Trustees' Room of Low Memorial Library, along with the cornerstone of College Hall. It has served as the basis for the appearances of all succeeding renditions of the King's Crown, particularly with the crosses attached to its band.

Though the King's Crown has been used as a symbol of Columbia in some capacity throughout most of the university's history, it was only popularized and made official at the turn of the 20th century. It first appeared on campus as a decorative motif with the installation of Alma Mater on the Low Library steps in 1903. Designed by Daniel Chester French, the scepter in the sculpture's right hand is topped with a miniature crown. Alma Mater was quickly followed by the donation of the Class of 1881 Flagpole in 1906, which has a crown-shaped finial, and by 1912, the university had adopted its current flag, which consists of a white crown on a blue field. The crown currently adorns many of the buildings and gates on the university's campus, and is also incorporated into the university's coat of arms and its academic regalia.

Currently, there are four designs of the crown in use by the university: a modern, minimalist version that has been the official symbol of the university since 2006, and one that replaces the crosses on the crown with diamonds, which was first used by the Columbia University Irving Medical Center in the early 2000s, in addition to separate designs for Columbia College, School of International and Public Affairs, and the Fu Foundation School of Engineering and Applied Science.

Uses of the King's Crown
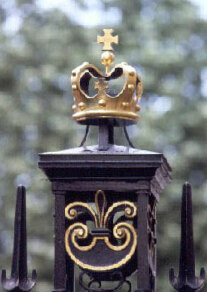
A King's Crown decorating a gate on campus

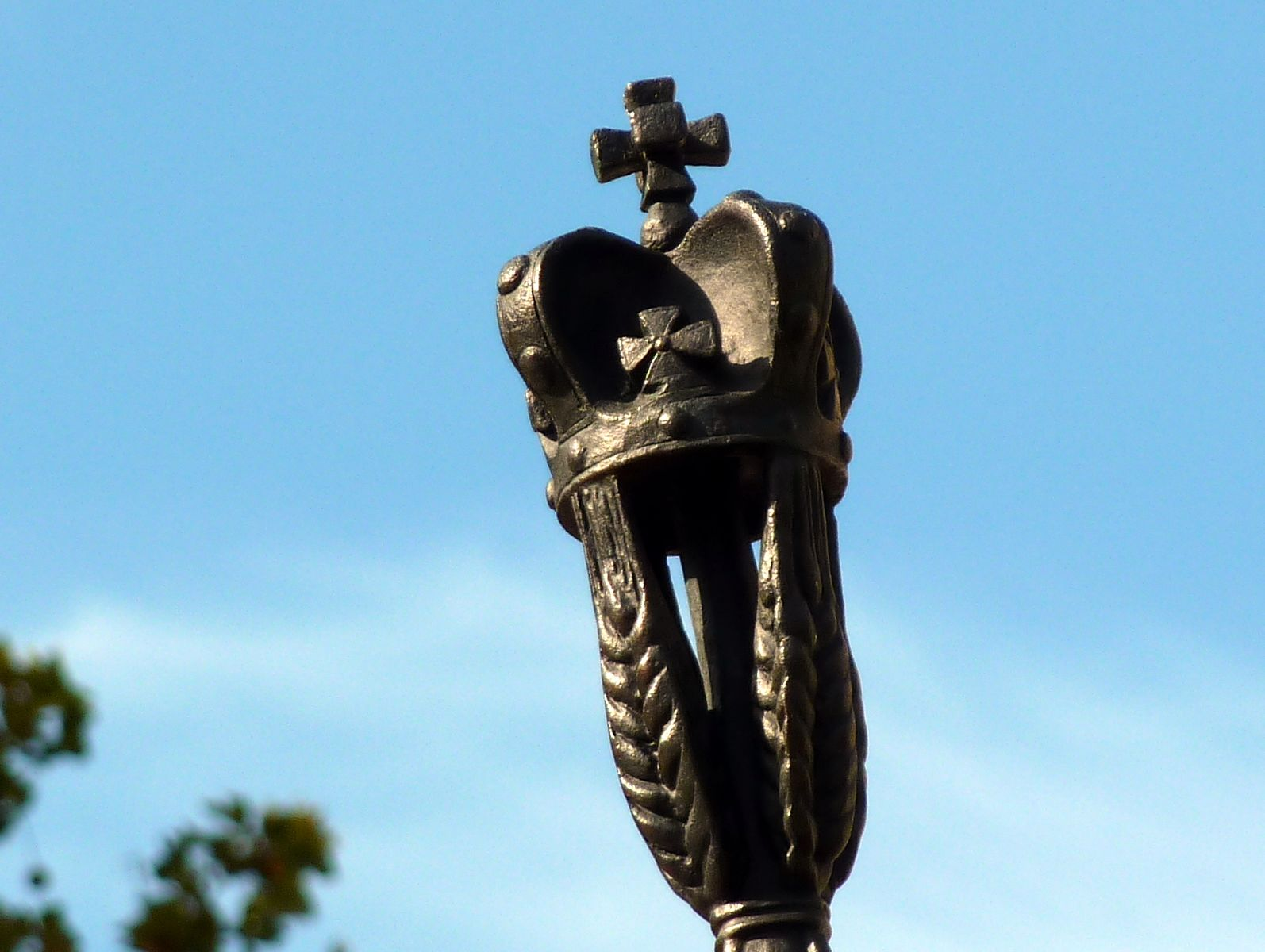
The scepter of Alma Mater, adorned with a King's Crown atop four sprays of wheat

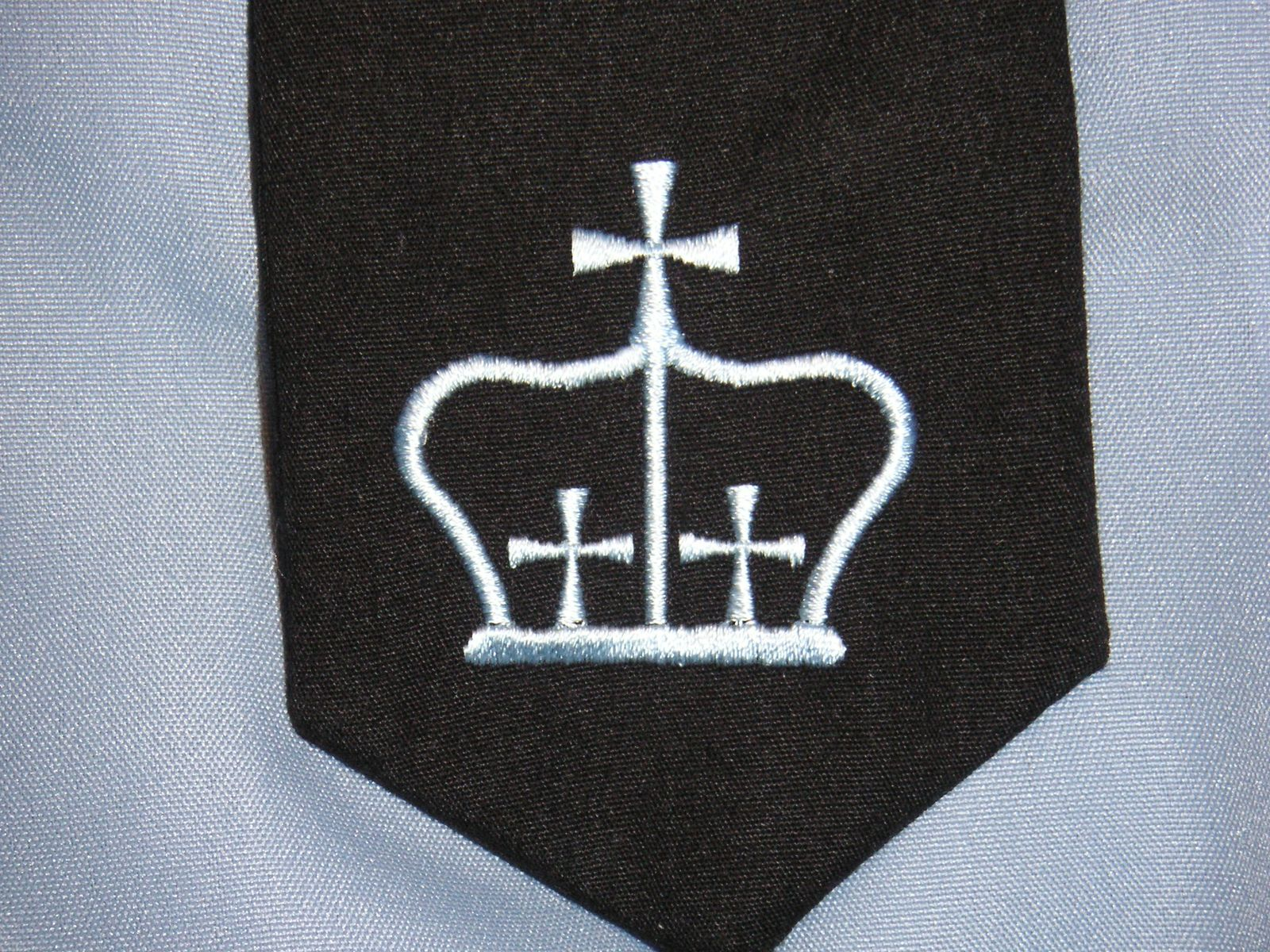
The crown embroidered on the university's academic regalia

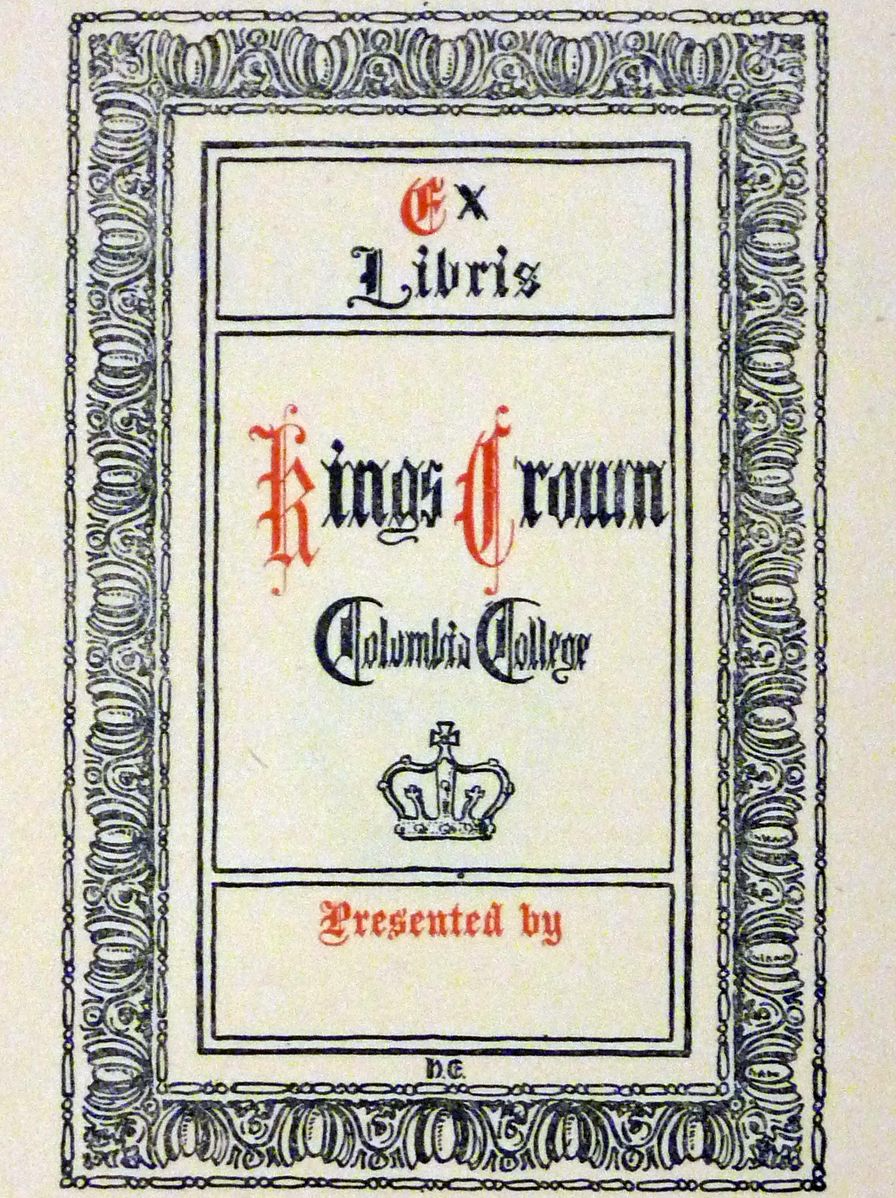
A book plate designed for King's Crown, a student organization from the early 20th century

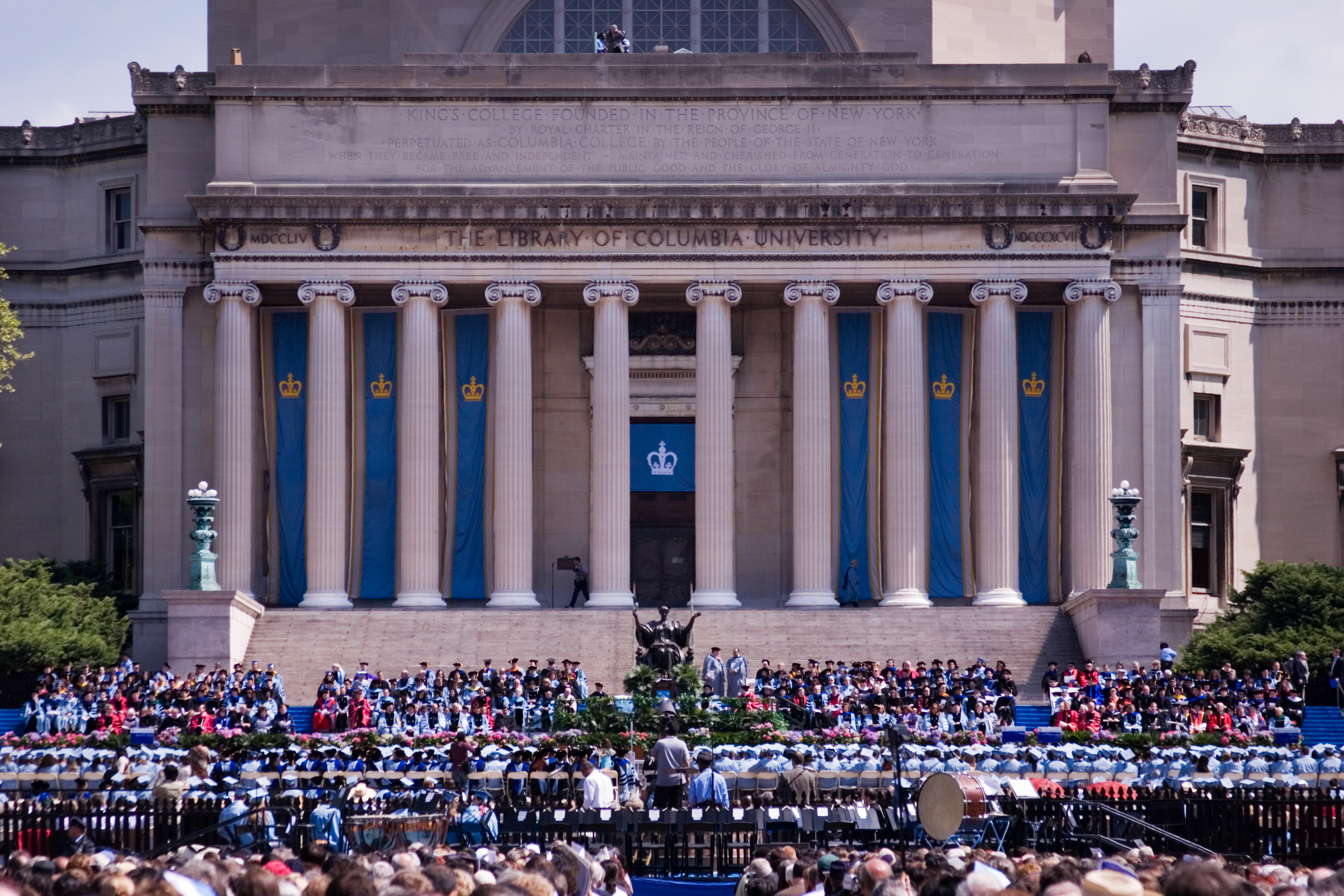
Low Memorial Library draped with King's Crown banners for commencement

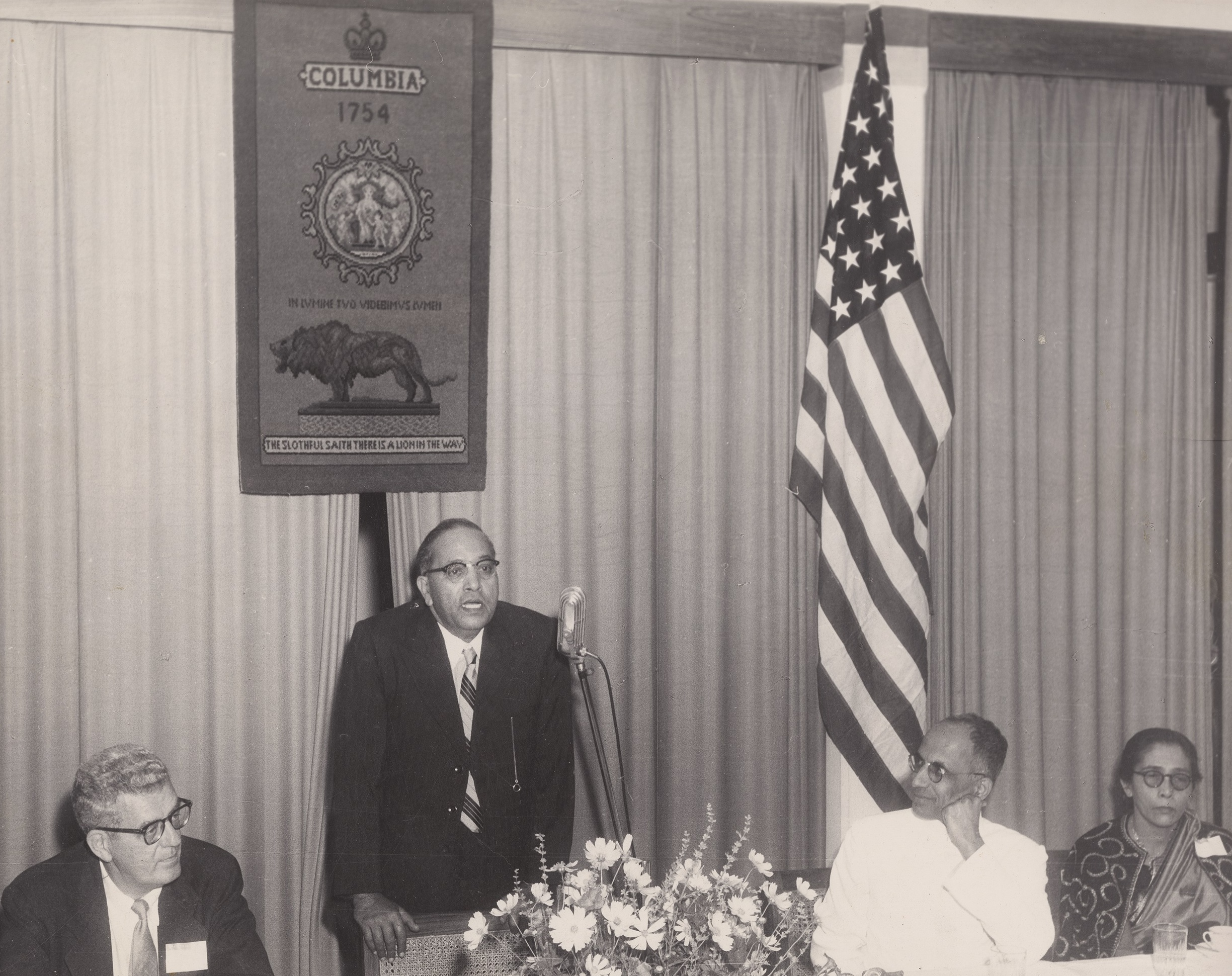
Alumnus B. R. Ambedkar addresses a 1954 seminar in New Delhi in front of a banner showing Columbia's crown, seal, motto, and lion

== See also ==
- Coat of arms of Yale University
- Heraldry of Harvard University
